= Eagles discography =

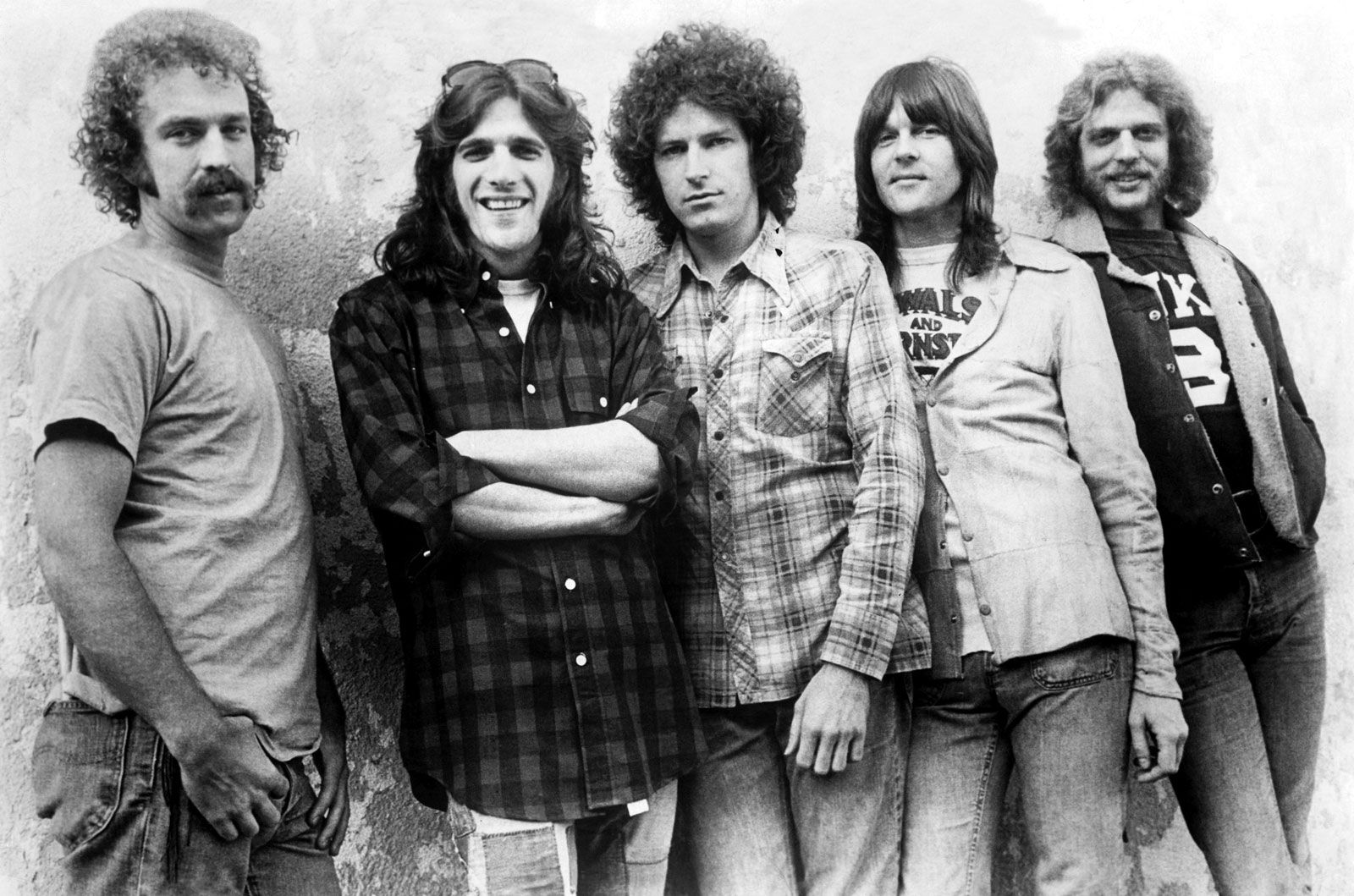
- Eagles circa 1974-1975
- Studio albums: 7
- Live albums: 3
- Compilation albums: 10
- Singles: 30
- Video albums: 2

The Eagles are an American rock band. Since their debut in 1972, they have released 7 studio albums, 3 live albums, 11 compilation albums, 4 video albums and 30 singles. Of those singles, five topped the Billboard Hot 100. The Eagles have a total of 18 Top 40 hits on the pop charts, as well as several hits on the adult contemporary chart. They are one of the best-selling popular music artists in history.

Their highest-selling studio album is 1976's Hotel California, which was certified 28× Platinum by the Recording Industry Association of America. The album's title track was their fourth number-one single on the pop charts, as well as their highest certified single, being certified Platinum. The Eagles also hold the distinction of releasing the highest-selling album of the 20th century in the United States. The band's compilation album Their Greatest Hits (1971–1975) sold more than 26 million copies domestically from its release until the end of 1999.

In 2007, the Eagles issued a full length studio album of new material for the first time in nearly 30 years with Long Road Out of Eden. The album debuted at number one on several charts around the world; including Norway and the United Kingdom. The album featured five consecutive Top 40 singles on the adult contemporary charts, and was certified 7× Platinum in the US.

== Albums ==
=== Studio albums ===
Title	Album details	Peak chart positions											Certifications
Title	Album details	US	AUS	AUT	CAN	GER	JPN	NL	NOR	NZ	SWE	UK	Certifications
Eagles	Release date: June 1, 1972; Format: LP; Label: Asylum	22	—	—	13	—	—	—	—	—	—	—	RIAA: Platinum; BPI: Silver
Desperado	Release date: April 17, 1973; Format: LP; Label: Asylum	41	31	—	35	—	—	5	—	40	—	39	RIAA: 2× Platinum; BPI: Silver
On the Border	Release date: March 22, 1974; Format: LP; Label: Asylum	17	27	—	12	—	—	3	—	—	—	28	RIAA: 2× Platinum; BPI: Silver
One of These Nights	Release date: June 10, 1975; Format: LP; Label: Asylum	1	5	—	2	49	28	2	9	2	—	8	RIAA: 4× Platinum; ARIA: 2× Platinum; BPI: Platinum; MC: Platinum
Hotel California	Release date: December 8, 1976; Format: LP; Label: Asylum	1	1	9	1	3	2	1	1	1	3	2	RIAA: 2× Diamond (28× Platinum); BPI: 6× Platinum; ARIA: 9× Platinum; IFPI AUT: Gold; MC: Diamond; NVPI: Platinum
The Long Run	Release date: September 24, 1979; Format: LP; Label: Asylum	1	1	—	1	20	1	3	5	2	1	4	RIAA: 7× Platinum; ARIA: 3× Platinum; BPI: Gold
Long Road Out of Eden	Release date: October 30, 2007; Format: 2×CD; Label: ERC	1	1	2	1	2	7	1	1	1	2	1	RIAA: 7× Platinum; ARIA: 3× Platinum; BPI: 2× Platinum; GLF: Platinum; IFPI AUT: Platinum; NVPI: Platinum; RMNZ: 3× Platinum
"—" denotes releases that did not chart

=== Live albums ===
Title	Album details	Peak chart positions											Certifications
Title	Album details	US	AUS	AUT	CAN	GER	JPN	NL	NOR	NZ	SWE	UK	Certifications
Eagles Live	Release date: November 7, 1980; Label: Asylum	6	3	—	25	55	8	7	25	9	44	24	RIAA: 7× Platinum; BPI: Gold; MC: Gold
Hell Freezes Over	Release date: November 8, 1994; Label: Geffen	1	23	24	1	26	6	10	3	13	9	18	RIAA: 9× Platinum; ARIA: Platinum; BPI: Platinum; GLF: Gold; IFPI NOR: Platinum; MC: 7× Platinum; NVPI: Gold; RIAJ: Gold
Live from the Forum MMXVIII	Release date: October 16, 2020; Label: Rhino	16	22	12		7		2	13		30	26	
"—" denotes releases that did not chart

=== Compilation albums ===
Title	Album details	Peak chart positions											Certifications
Title	Album details	US	AUS	AUT	CAN	GER	JPN	NL	NOR	NZ	SWE	UK	Certifications
Their Greatest Hits (1971–1975)	Release date: February 17, 1976; Label: Asylum	1	3	—	1	—	35	—	8	2	31	2	RIAA: 4× Diamond (40× Platinum); ARIA: 8× Platinum; BPI: Platinum; MC: 2× Diamond
Eagles Greatest Hits Volume 2	Release date: 1982; Label: Asylum	52	5	—	63	—	44	—	—	2	—	—	RIAA: Diamond (11× Platinum); ARIA: 3× Platinum
The Best of Eagles	Release date: May 10, 1985; Label: Asylum	—	7	—	—	56	—	—	—	1	—	8	ARIA: 5× Platinum; BPI: 4× Platinum; RIAJ: Gold
The Legend of Eagles	Release date: 1988; Label: Asylum	—	—	—	—	—	—	5	—	—	—	—	NVPI: Platinum
The Very Best of the Eagles (1994)	Release date: July 11, 1994; Label: Asylum	—	2	—	28	22	49	10	4	3	7	4	ARIA: 12× Platinum; BPI: 2× Platinum; GLF: Gold; NVPI: Platinum; RIAJ: Platinum
Selected Works: 1972–1999	Release date: November 14, 2000; Label: Elektra, Warner Strategic Marketing	109	8	—	—	—	91	85	—	2	—	28	RIAA: Platinum; ARIA: Platinum; BPI: Gold; RMNZ: Gold
The Very Best of the Eagles (2001)	Release date: May 28, 2001; Label: Elektra, Warner Strategic Marketing	—	11	—	—	20	—	9	4	9	29	3	BPI: Platinum; NVPI: Platinum; RMNZ: 8× Platinum
The Very Best Of / The Complete Greatest Hits	Released: October 21, 2003; Label: Asylum, Warner Strategic Marketing	3	10	43	8	56	21	29	29	5	8	9	RIAA: 5× Platinum; ARIA: 4× Platinum; BPI: 3× Platinum; MC: 2× Platinum; RMNZ: Platinum
Eagles	Release date: March 15, 2005; Label: Asylum, Warner Strategic Marketing	—	—	—	—	—	—	—	—	—	—	—	
The Studio Albums 1972–1979	Release date: March 25, 2013; Label: Asylum/Rhino (Warner Music)	—	—	—	—	—	35	87	—	—	50	—	
Their Greatest Hits, Vols. 1 & 2	Release date: July 14, 2017; Label: Rhino/Elektra	—	—	—	—	—	—	2	—	—	—	—	
Legacy	Release date: November 2, 2018; Label: Elektra/Asylum (Warner Music)	—	—	—	—	—	—	—	—	—	—	—	
To the Limit: The Essential Collection	Release date: April 12, 2024; Label: Rhino/Elektra	30	—	—	46	52	—	66	—	18	—	43	RMNZ: Gold
"—" denotes releases that did not chart

== Singles ==
Year	Title	Peak chart positions											Certifications	Album
Year	Title	US	US AC	US Country	AUS	CAN	CAN AC	CAN Country	GER	NL	NZ	UK	Certifications	Album
1972	"Take It Easy"	12	12	—	49	8	—	—	—	—	—	188	BPI: Platinum; RMNZ: 7× Platinum	Eagles
1972	"Witchy Woman"	9	—	—	81	8	—	—	—	26	—	—	RMNZ: Gold	Eagles
1972	"Peaceful Easy Feeling"	22	20	—	—	35	22	—	—	—	—	—	BPI: Silver; RMNZ: Platinum	Eagles
1973	"Tequila Sunrise"	64	26	—	—	68	81	—	—	—	—	—	BPI: Silver; RMNZ: Platinum	Desperado
1973	"Outlaw Man"	59	—	—	—	—	—	—	—	—	—	—		Desperado
1974	"Already Gone"	32	—	—	—	12	—	—	—	—	—	—		On the Border
1974	"James Dean"	77	—	—	—	56	—	—	—	—	—	—		On the Border
1974	"Best of My Love"	1	1	—	14	1	1	—	—	—	—	—	RMNZ: Gold	On the Border
1975	"One of These Nights"	1	20	—	33	13	18	—	—	7	3	23	BPI: Gold; RMNZ: 3× Platinum	One of These Nights
1975	"Lyin' Eyes"	2	3	8	34	19	4	20	—	23	7	23	BPI: Gold; RMNZ: 2× Platinum	One of These Nights
1975	"Take It to the Limit"	4	4	—	30	16	6	—	—	—	23	12	BPI: Silver; RMNZ: Platinum	One of These Nights
1976	"New Kid in Town"	1	2	43	16	1	2	12	44	11	6	20	RIAA: Gold; BPI: Silver; RMNZ: Platinum	Hotel California
1977	"Hotel California"	1	10	—	60	1	2	—	6	6	5	8	RIAA: Platinum; BPI: 5× Platinum; RMNZ: 12× Platinum	Hotel California
1977	"Life in the Fast Lane"	11	—	—	96	12	41	—	—	—	—	—	BPI: Gold; RMNZ: 2× Platinum	Hotel California
1978	"Please Come Home for Christmas"	18	—	—	34	23	—	—	—	5	28	30	RIAA: 4× Platinum; BPI: Gold; RMNZ: Platinum	Non-album single
1979	"Heartache Tonight"	1	38	—	13	1	—	—	—	20	7	40	RIAA: Gold; RMNZ: Platinum	The Long Run
1979	"The Long Run"	8	34	—	—	9	9	—	—	—	30	66	RMNZ: Gold	The Long Run
1980	"I Can't Tell You Why"	8	3	—	—	5	2	—	—	49	11	—	RMNZ: Platinum	The Long Run
1980	"Seven Bridges Road"	21	17	55	—	—	—	—	—	—	—	—		Eagles Live
1994	"Get Over It"	31	21	—	74	4	13	—	55	—	—	—		Hell Freezes Over
1994	"Love Will Keep Us Alive"	—	1	—	—	10	11	—	—	—	—	52	RMNZ: Gold	Hell Freezes Over
1994	"The Girl from Yesterday"	—	—	58	—	—	—	69	—	—	—	—		Hell Freezes Over
1995	"Learn to Be Still"	—	15	—	—	9	—	—	79	—	—	—		Hell Freezes Over
2003	"Hole in the World"	69	5	—	—	11	—	—	—	51	—	69		The Very Best Of
2005	"No More Cloudy Days"	—	3	—	—	—	—	—	—	—	—	—		Long Road Out of Eden
2007	"How Long"	101	7	23	—	76	—	*	—	—	—	110		Long Road Out of Eden
2008	"Busy Being Fabulous"	—	12	28	—	—	—	*	—	—	—	—		Long Road Out of Eden
2008	"What Do I Do with My Heart"	—	13	—	—	—	—	—	—	—	—	—		Long Road Out of Eden
2009	"I Don't Want to Hear Any More"	—	23	—	—	—	—	—	—	—	—	—		Long Road Out of Eden
"—" denotes release did not chart or was not released in that territory.

== Other charted songs ==
Year	Song	Peak chart positions			Album
Year	Song	US AC	US Adult	UK	Album
1995	"Please Come Home for Christmas"	—	31	—	Christmas of Hope
1997	"Please Come Home for Christmas"	15	—	—	Christmas of Hope
2007	"Please Come Home for Christmas"	—	—	93	—N/a
2013	"Take It Easy"	—	—	188	The Complete Greatest Hits
"—" denotes release did not chart or was not released in that territory.

== Other appearances ==
Year	Song	Album	Notes
2017	"Part of the Plan"	A Tribute to Dan Fogelberg	Dan Fogelberg cover

== Videography ==
=== Videos/DVDs ===
Title	Album details	Certifications
Hell Freezes Over	Release date: November 8, 1994; Label: Geffen	RIAA: 9× Platinum; ARIA: 20× Platinum; BPI: 3× Platinum; MC: Platinum
Farewell 1 Tour: Live from Melbourne	Release date: June 14, 2005; Label: Warner Vision	RIAA: Diamond (30× Platinum); ARIA: 13× Platinum; BPI: 2× Platinum; MC: Diamond
History of the Eagles	Release date: April 30, 2013; Studio: Jigsaw Productions	RIAA: Platinum; ARIA: 2× Platinum; BPI: Gold; MC: 9× Platinum
Live from the Forum MMXVIII	Release date: October 16, 2020 (Premiere: July 5, 2020)	

=== Music videos ===
Year	Video	Album	Director
2003	"Hole in the World"	The Very Best Of	Martyn Atkins
2007	"How Long"	Long Road Out of Eden	Don Henley
2008	"Busy Being Fabulous"	Long Road Out of Eden	Olaf Heine
