= Eagles (box set) =

Compilation album by Eagles
- Released: March 15, 2005
- Recorded: February 1972 – July 31, 1980
- Genre: Rock
- Length: 325:30
- Label: Warner Strategic Marketing
- Producers: Glyn Johns, Bill Szymczyk

Eagles chronology
The Very Best Of (2003)	Eagles (2005)	Long Road Out of Eden (2007)

Eagles is a box set by the American rock band the Eagles. The box set includes material from the band's time under the Elektra and Asylum labels between 1972 and 1980.

== Reception ==
AllMusic's Stephen Thomas Erlewine praised the set's artwork, but said "it's something that only hardcore fans will truly find a bargain at a list price of $129.98."

== Track listing ==
Eagles

1. "Take It Easy" (Jackson Browne, Glenn Frey) – 3:32
2. "Witchy Woman" (Don Henley, Bernie Leadon) – 4:11
3. "Chug All Night" (Frey) – 3:16
4. "Most of Us Are Sad" (Frey) – 3:35
5. "Nightingale" (Browne) – 4:08
6. "Train Leaves Here This Morning" (Gene Clark, Leadon) – 4:10
7. "Take the Devil" (Meisner) – 4:01
8. "Earlybird" (Leadon, Meisner) – 3:00
9. "Peaceful Easy Feeling" (Jack Tempchin) – 4:17
10. "Tryin'" (Meisner) – 2:53

Desperado

1. "Doolin-Dalton" (Browne, Frey, Henley, JD Souther) – 3:29
2. "Twenty–One" (Leadon) – 2:10
3. "Out of Control" (Frey, Henley, Nixon) – 3:05
4. "Tequila Sunrise" (Frey, Henley) – 2:54
5. "Desperado" (Frey, Henley) – 3:36
6. "Certain Kind of Fool" (Meisner, Frey, Henley) – 3:02
7. "Doolin-Dalton" (Browne, Frey, Henley, Souther) – :47
8. "Outlaw Man" (David Blue) – 3:34
9. "Saturday Night" (Meisner, Frey, Henley, Leadon) – 3:20
10. "Bitter Creek" (Leadon) – 5:03
11. "Doolin-Dalton/Desperado (Reprise)" (Browne, Frey, Henley, Souther) – 4:50

On the Border

1. "Already Gone" (Strandlin, Tempchin) – 4:15
2. "You Never Cry Like a Lover" (Henley, Souther) – 4:00
3. "Midnight Flyer" (Craft) – 3:58
4. "My Man" (Leadon) – 3:30
5. "On the Border" (Frey, Leadon, Henley) – 4:23
6. "James Dean" (Browne, Frey, Henley, Souther) – 3:38
7. "Ol '55" (Tom Waits) – 4:21
8. "Is It True" (Meisner) – 3:14
9. "Good Day in Hell" (Frey, Henley) – 4:26
10. "Best of My Love" (Frey, Henley, Souther) – 4:34

One of These Nights

1. "One of These Nights" (Frey, Henley) – 4:51
2. "Too Many Hands" (Meisner, Felder) – 4:40
3. "Hollywood Waltz" (B.Leadon, T.Leadon, Frey, Henley) – 4:01
4. "Journey of the Sorcerer" (Leadon) – 6:38
5. "Lyin' Eyes" (Frey, Henley) – 6:21
6. "Take It to the Limit" (Meisner, Frey, Henley) – 4:46
7. "Visions" (Felder, Henley) – 3:58
8. "After the Thrill Is Gone" (Frey, Henley) – 3:56
9. "I Wish You Peace" (Davis, Leadon) – 3:45

Hotel California

1. "Hotel California" (Felder, Frey, Henley) – 6:30
2. "New Kid in Town" (Frey, Henley, Souther) – 5:03
3. "Life in the Fast Lane" (Frey, Henley, Walsh) – 4:46
4. "Wasted Time" (Frey, Henley) – 4:56
5. "Wasted Time (Reprise)" (Frey, Henley, Norman) – 1:23
6. "Victim of Love" (Felder, Frey, Henley, Souther) – 4:09
7. "Pretty Maids All in a Row" (Vitale, Walsh) – 3:58
8. "Try and Love Again" (Meisner) – 5:10
9. "The Last Resort" (Frey, Henley) – 7:28

The Long Run

1. "The Long Run" (Frey, Henley) – 3:43
2. "I Can't Tell You Why" (Schmit, Frey, Henley) – 4:55
3. "In the City" (DeVorzon, Walsh) – 3:46
4. "The Disco Strangler" (Felder, Frey, Henley) – 2:44
5. "King of Hollywood" (Frey, Henley) – 6:28
6. "Heartache Tonight" (Frey, Henley, Bob Seger, Souther) – 4:26
7. "Those Shoes" (Felder, Frey, Henley) – 4:54
8. "Teenage Jail" (Frey, Henley, Souther) – 3:44
9. "The Greeks Don't Want No Freaks" (Frey, Henley) – 2:20
10. "The Sad Café" (Frey, Henley, Souther, Walsh) – 5:35

Eagles Live

1. "Hotel California" (Felder, Frey, Henley) – 7:00
2. "Heartache Tonight" (Frey, Henley, Seger, Souther) – 4:33
3. "I Can't Tell You Why" (Schmit, Frey, Henley) – 5:17
4. "The Long Run" (Frey, Henley) – 5:51
5. "New Kid in Town" (Frey, Henley, Souther) – 5:53
6. "Life's Been Good" (Walsh) – 8:56
7. "Seven Bridges Road" (Steve Young) – 3:54
8. "Wasted Time" (Frey, Henley) – 5:21
9. "Take It to the Limit" (Meisner, Frey, Henley) – 5:14
10. "Doolin-Dalton (Reprise II)" (Frey, Henley, Norman) – 0:41
11. "Desperado" (Frey, Henley) – 3:57
12. "Saturday Night" (Meisner, Frey, Henley, Leadon) – 3:47
13. "All Night Long" (Walsh) – 5:34
14. "Life in the Fast Lane" (Frey, Henley, Walsh) – 5:09
15. "Take It Easy" (Browne, Frey) – 5:16

Bonus single

1. "Please Come Home for Christmas" (Charles Brown, Redd) – 3:00
2. "Funky New Year" (Frey, Henley) – 4:01
