= Selected Works: 1972–1999 =

Box set by Eagles
- Released: November 2, 2000
- Recorded: 1972–1999
- Genre: Rock
- Length: 239:09
- Labels: Elektra; Warner Strategic Marketing

Eagles chronology
Hell Freezes Over (1994)	Selected Works: 1972–1999 (2000)	The Very Best Of (2003)

Professional ratings
Review scores
Source	Rating
AllMusic	4/5 stars
Rolling Stone	3/5 stars

Selected Works: 1972–1999 is a compilation box set by the Eagles, released in 2000. The box set consists of four CDs featuring their greatest hits, album tracks, previously unreleased live performances recorded on 29–31 December 1999 in Las Vegas and Los Angeles and a 44-page booklet. This set chronicles their work from their debut 1972 self-titled album Eagles to the 1999 millennium concert performed at the Staples Center in Los Angeles, December 31, 1999.

== Track listing ==
Disc one: The Early Days
No.	Title	Writer(s)	Origin	Length
1.	"Take It Easy"	Jackson Browne, Glenn Frey	Eagles, 1972	3:31
2.	"Hollywood Waltz"	Bernie Leadon, Frey, Don Henley, Tom Leadon	One of These Nights, 1975	4:01
3.	"Already Gone"	Jack Tempchin, Robb Strandlund	On the Border, 1974	4:15
4.	"Doolin-Dalton"	Browne, Frey, Henley, JD Souther	Desperado, 1973	3:26
5.	"Midnight Flyer"	Paul Craft	On the Border	3:58
6.	"Tequila Sunrise"	Henley, Frey	Desperado	2:52
7.	"Witchy Woman"	Henley, Leadon	Eagles	4:11
8.	"Train Leaves Here This Morning"	Gene Clark, Leadon	Eagles	4:07
9.	"Outlaw Man"	David Blue	Desperado	3:29
10.	"Peaceful Easy Feeling"	Tempchin	Eagles	4:16
11.	"James Dean"	Browne, Frey, Souther, Henley	On the Border	3:36
12.	"Saturday Night"	Frey, Henley, Leadon, Randy Meisner	Desperado	3:19
13.	"On the Border"	Henley, Leadon, Frey	On the Border	4:28
Total length:				49:28

Disc two: The Ballads
No.	Title	Writer(s)	Origin	Length
1.	"Wasted Time (Reprise)"	Henley, Frey, Jim Ed Norman	Hotel California, 1976	1:21
2.	"Wasted Time"	Henley, Frey	Hotel California	4:55
3.	"I Can't Tell You Why"	Timothy B. Schmit, Henley, Frey	The Long Run, 1979	4:53
4.	"Lyin' Eyes"	Henley, Frey	One of These Nights	6:21
5.	"Pretty Maids All in a Row"	Joe Walsh, Joe Vitale	Hotel California	3:58
6.	"Desperado"	Henley, Frey	Desperado	3:33
7.	"Try and Love Again"	Meisner	Hotel California	5:10
8.	"The Best of My Love"	Henley, Frey, Souther	On the Border	4:34
9.	"New Kid in Town"	Souther, Henley, Frey	Hotel California	5:03
10.	"Love Will Keep Us Alive"	Pete Vale, Jim Capaldi, Paul Carrack	Hell Freezes Over, 1994	4:02
11.	"The Sad Café"	Henley, Frey, Walsh, Souther	The Long Run	5:33
12.	"Take It to the Limit"	Meisner, Henley, Frey	One of These Nights	4:47
13.	"After the Thrill Is Gone"	Henley, Frey	One of These Nights	4:49
Total length:				58:59

Disc three: The Fast Lane
No.	Title	Writer(s)	Origin	Length
1.	"One of These Nights (Intro)"	Henley, Frey	One of These Nights	1:59
2.	"One of These Nights"	Henley, Frey	One of These Nights	4:49
3.	"The Disco Strangler"	Don Felder, Frey, Henley	The Long Run	2:45
4.	"Heartache Tonight"	Henley, Frey, Bob Seger, Souther	The Long Run	4:25
5.	"Hotel California"	Felder, Henley, Frey	Hotel California	6:29
6.	"Born to Boogie"	Hank Williams Jr.	Previously unreleased outtake from The Long Run sessions	2:16
7.	"In the City"	Walsh, Barry De Vorzon	The Long Run	3:44
8.	"Get Over It"	Henley, Frey	Hell Freezes Over	3:29
9.	"King of Hollywood"	Frey, Henley	The Long Run	6:25
10.	"Too Many Hands"	Felder, Meisner	One of These Nights	4:40
11.	"Life in the Fast Lane"	Walsh, Henley, Frey	Hotel California	4:44
12.	"The Long Run"	Henley, Frey	The Long Run	3:41
13.	"Long Run Leftovers"	Walsh, Henley, Frey, Felder, Schmit	Previously unreleased	3:02
14.	"The Last Resort"	Henley, Frey	Hotel California	7:29
15.	"Random Victims, Part 3"	Walsh, Henley, Frey, Felder, Meisner, Schmit	Previously unreleased	9:42
Total length:				1:09:39

Disc four: The Millennium Concert (A Night to Remember)
No.	Title	Writer(s)	Lead vocals	Length
1.	"Hotel California"	Felder, Frey, Henley	Henley	6:57
2.	"Victim of Love"	Felder, Frey, Henley, Souther	Henley	5:01
3.	"Peaceful Easy Feeling"	Tempchin	Frey	5:23
4.	"Please Come Home for Christmas"	Charles Brown, Gene Redd	Henley	3:52
5.	"Ol' '55"	Tom Waits	Frey and Henley	5:20
6.	"Take it to the Limit"	Frey, Henley, Meisner	Frey	4:02
7.	"Those Shoes"	Felder, Frey, Henley	Henley	6:12
8.	"Funky New Year"	Frey, Henley	Henley	3:45
9.	"Dirty Laundry"	Henley, Danny Kortchmar	Henley	5:54
10.	"Funk 49"	Jim Fox, Dale Peters, Walsh	Walsh	3:47
11.	"All She Wants to Do Is Dance"	Kortchmar	Henley	5:20
12.	"The Best of My Love"	Frey, Henley, Souther	Henley	5:06
Total length:				60:39

== Personnel ==
Eagles

- Glenn Frey – vocals, acoustic guitar, electric guitar, harmonica, keyboards, harmonium, synthesizer, piano, clavinet, Wurlitzer electric piano, slide guitar (all discs)
- Don Henley – vocals, drums, percussion, tabla, acoustic guitar, electric guitar, synthesizer (all discs)
- Randy Meisner – vocals, bass guitar, guitarron (discs 1, all tracks except 3, 10 and 11 on disc 2 and tracks 2, 5, 10, 11 and 14 on disc 3)
- Bernie Leadon – vocals, electric guitar, acoustic guitar, banjo, mandolin, pedal steel guitar (discs 1, tracks 4, 6, 8, 12 and 13 on disc 2 and tracks 2 and 10 on disc 3)
- Don Felder – electric guitar, acoustic guitar, slide guitar, pedal steel guitar, Hammond organ, backing vocals (tracks 2–3 on disc 1, all songs except tracks 6 & 8 on disc 2 and all songs on discs 3 and 4)
- Joe Walsh – vocals, electric guitar, acoustic guitar, Fender Rhodes, Hammond organ, synthesizer, piano, slide guitar (tracks 2, 3, 5, 7, 9–11 on disc 2, all tracks except 2 and 10 on disc 3 and all tracks on disc 4)
- Timothy B. Schmit – vocals, bass (tracks 3, 10 and 11 on disc 2, all tracks except 2, 5, 10, 11 and 14 on disc 3 and all tracks on disc 4)

Sidemen

- John Corey – guitar, keyboards, vocals
- Timothy Drury – guitar, keyboards, vocals
- Albhy Galuten – synthesizer
- Al Garth – clarinet, saxophone, violin
- Gary Grimm – keyboards, percussion
- Jim Ed Norman – piano, string arrangements
- Jay Oliver – keyboards
- David Sanborn – alto saxophone
- Scott Crago – drums, percussion

Technical

- Glyn Johns – record production, engineer
- Bill Szymczyk – record production, engineer

== Charts ==
=== Weekly charts ===
Chart (2013–14)	Peak position
Australian Albums (ARIA)	8
Dutch Albums (Album Top 100)	85
New Zealand Albums (RMNZ)	2
UK Albums (Official Charts)	28
US Billboard 200	109
Chart (2019)	Peak position
Australian Albums (ARIA)	8

=== Year-end charts ===
Chart (2014)	Position
Australian Albums Chart	53
New Zealand Albums Chart	21
Chart (2015)	Position
Australian Albums Chart	52
New Zealand Albums (RMNZ)	18

== Certifications ==
Region	Certification	Certified units/sales
Australia (ARIA)	Platinum	70,000^{^}
New Zealand (RMNZ)	Gold	7,500^{^}
United Kingdom (BPI) 2013 release	Gold	100,000^{*}
United States (RIAA)	Platinum	1,000,000^{^}
^{*} Sales figures based on certification alone.^{^} Shipments figures based on certification alone.
