= Live from the Forum MMXVIII =

Live album by the Eagles
- Released: October 16, 2020
- Recorded: September 12, 14 –15, 2018
- Venue: The Forum, Inglewood, California
- Genre: Rock
- Length: 2:17:33
- Label: Rhino
- Producer: Don Henley

Eagles chronology
Long Road Out of Eden (2007)	Live from the Forum MMXVIII (2020)

Live from the Forum MMXVIII is the third live album and a concert film from the Eagles. It records the concerts at the Forum in Inglewood, California that took place over three nights in September 2018. It is the first release to feature new band members Deacon Frey and Vince Gill alongside Don Henley, Joe Walsh and Timothy B. Schmit. Deacon, son of the late former band member Glenn Frey, and Gill joined the band following the death of the elder Frey in 2016. Songs performed at the concert include the best known songs by the Eagles as well as solo works by members of the band. It was released on October 16, 2020, in a variety of formats, including CD, DVD and Blu-ray.

== Background ==
In 2016, after Glenn Frey died, Don Henley decided that the band would not play again. However, Henley reversed his decision and announced in March 2017 that the Eagles would perform in two festivals organized by their manager Irving Azoff that featured classic rock bands, starting with The Classic West festival held at Dodger Stadium in July that year. Henley brought in Frey's son Deacon to perform with the remaining members of the Eagles in these shows after he saw Deacon perform Glenn Frey's songs at his memorial service. Henley said that, for the band to continue, "the only way it felt justified to me was to have family blood in the band". They were also joined by Vince Gill, who performed at the Kennedy Center Honors in December 2016 where the Eagles were one of the honorees. Gill "fit like a glove", according to Henley.

After the festival performances in Los Angeles and New York, the band announced that a North American tour featuring Deacon Frey and Vince Gill would begin in March 2018 in Chicago, to be followed by a world tour in 2019. Another world tour scheduled for 2020, titled the Hotel California 2020 Tour, was postponed due to the COVID-19 pandemic.

=== Recording ===
The North American tour included a three-night stop (September 12, 14 and 15, 2018) at the Forum in Los Angeles, California, where the concerts were recorded. The setlist included many of the best-known songs of the Eagles, but also hits recorded by individual members, such as Henley's "The Boys of Summer", Walsh's "Life's Been Good" and Gill's "Don't Let Our Love Start Slippin' Away". The band performed 26 songs every night apart from the show on September 14 when they performed 27 songs, adding "The Long Run" to their second encore. The recordings of the concerts were compiled into a 26-song live album and concert film. The only song on their setlist omitted on this release is "Witchy Woman", with "The Long Run" from September 14 added instead.

At one point during the video, bassist Timothy B. Schmit (who made the bulk of the between-song announcements) tells the live audience that his predecessor Randy Meisner is in the house. However, Meisner is not shown on camera.

=== Release ===
The film of the concert was directed by Nick Wickham and filmed on 14 4K cameras. It premiered on ESPN on July 5, 2020, the first time a concert was shown on the sports network.

The recordings were released for sale on October 16, 2020, in several audio and video formats and in various configurations, including a super deluxe box set with Blu-ray, two CDs and four LPs.

== Track listing ==
=== CD 1 ===
No.	Title	Writer(s)	Lead vocals	Length
1.	"Seven Bridges Road"	Steve Young	group	3:33
2.	"Joe Walsh: "How ya doin?""			0:33
3.	"Take It Easy"	Jackson Browne, Glenn Frey	Deacon Frey	4:14
4.	"One of These Nights"	Don Henley, Frey	Henley	4:23
5.	"Don Henley: "Good evening, ladies and gentlemen""			2:12
6.	"Take It to the Limit"	Henley, Frey, Randy Meisner	Vince Gill	4:21
7.	"Tequila Sunrise"	Henley, Frey	Gill	3:05
8.	"In the City"	Joe Walsh, Barry De Vorzon	Walsh	5:45
9.	"Timothy B. Schmit: "Hey, everybody, that’s Joe Walsh""			0:48
10.	"I Can't Tell You Why"	Henley, Frey, Timothy B. Schmit	Schmit	5:08
11.	"New Kid in Town"	Henley, Frey, JD Souther	Gill	5:11
12.	"Don Henley: "Just want to thank all of you…""			1:25
13.	"How Long"	Souther	Deacon Frey, Henley	3:21
14.	"Deacon Frey: "Hello, everybody…""			0:36
15.	"Peaceful Easy Feeling"	Jack Tempchin	Deacon Frey	4:29
16.	"Ol' '55"	Tom Waits	Gill	4:18
17.	"Lyin' Eyes"	Henley, Frey	Gill	6:30
18.	"Love Will Keep Us Alive"	Jim Capaldi, Paul Carrack, Peter Vale	Schmit	4:13
19.	"Vince Gill: "How's everybody doing?""			0:36
20.	"Don't Let Our Love Start Slippin' Away"	Vince Gill, Pete Wasner	Gill	5:18
21.	"Those Shoes"	Henley, Frey, Don Felder	Henley	5:07
Total length:				1:15:06

=== CD 2 ===
No.	Title	Writer(s)	Lead vocals	Length
1.	"Already Gone"	Robb Strandlund, Tempchin	Deacon Frey	4:23
2.	"Walk Away"	Walsh	Walsh	3:59
3.	"Joe Walsh: "Is everybody OK?"			1:54
4.	"Life's Been Good"	Walsh	Walsh	8:04
5.	"The Boys of Summer"	Henley, Mike Campbell	Henley	5:15
6.	"Heartache Tonight"	Henley, Frey, Bob Seger, Souther	Gill	4:28
7.	"Funk #49"	Walsh, Jimmy Fox, Dale Peters	Walsh	4:44
8.	"Life in the Fast Lane"	Henley, Frey, Walsh	Henley	5:55
9.	"Hotel California"	Henley, Frey, Felder	Henley	8:27
10.	"Rocky Mountain Way"	Walsh, Roche Grace, Kenny Passarelli, Joe Vitale	Walsh	6:29
11.	"Desperado"	Henley, Frey	Henley	4:10
12.	"The Long Run"	Henley, Frey	Henley	4:40
Total length:				1:02:27

== Personnel ==
=== Eagles ===
- Don Henley – vocals, drums, guitars, percussion
- Joe Walsh – vocals, guitars, keyboards
- Timothy B. Schmit – bass guitar, vocals
- Deacon Frey – vocals, guitars
- Vince Gill – vocals, guitars

=== Eagles backing band ===
- Michael Thompson - keyboards, accordion, vocals
- Will Hollis - keyboards, vocals, musical director
- Scott Crago - drums, percussion
- Steuart Smith - guitars, vocals

=== Horns ===
- Michael Boscarino
- Michael Cottone
- Tom Evans
- Jamie Hovorka
- David Mann

=== Strings ===
- Milo Deering
- Kristine Kruta
- Christiana Liberis
- Laura Sacks
- Erica Swindell

=== Production ===
Album

- Audio produced by Don Henley
- Recording and mixing by Jeff Balding
- Digital editing by Richard F.W. Davis
- Mastering by Bob Ludwig

Concert film

- Nick Wickham – director
- Vance Burberry – director of photography
- Tom Woolcott – film editor
- Sharon Everett, Guy Harding and Clark Eddy – other editors

- Irving Azoff and Sheira Rees-Davies – executive producers
- Art direction and design by Jeri Heiden and Ryan Corey
- Produced by Ned Doyle, Karim Karmi and Sheira Rees-Davies

== Charts ==
=== Weekly charts ===
Chart performance for Live from the Forum MMXVIII
Chart (2020)	Peak position
Australian Albums (ARIA)	22
Austrian Albums (Ö3 Austria)	12
Belgian Albums (Ultratop Flanders)	5
Belgian Albums (Ultratop Wallonia)	22
Danish Albums (Hitlisten)	9
Dutch Albums (Album Top 100)	2
French Albums (SNEP)	73
German Albums (Offizielle Top 100)	7
Hungarian Albums (MAHASZ)	6
Irish Albums (OCC)	14
Italian Albums (FIMI)	75
Japan (Billboard Japan)	33
Norwegian Albums (VG-lista)	13
Portuguese Albums (AFP)	15
Scottish Albums (OCC)	4
Spanish Albums (PROMUSICAE)	23
Swedish Albums (Sverigetopplistan)	30
Swiss Albums (Schweizer Hitparade)	4
UK Albums (OCC)	26
US Billboard 200	16
US Top Rock Albums (Billboard)	4

=== Year-end charts ===
Year-end chart performance for Live from the Forum MMXVIII
Chart (2020)	Position
US Top Rock Albums (Billboard)	98
