= Farewell 1 Tour: Live from Melbourne =

Video by Eagles
- Released: June 14, 2005
- Recorded: November 14, 15 and 17, 2004
- Venues: Rod Laver Arena (Melbourne, Australia)
- Genre: Rock
- Length: 175 minutes
- Label: Warner Vision
- Director: Carol Dodds
- Producers: Glenn Frey (also exec.); Ken Ehrlich; Harry Sandler

Eagles chronology
Hell Freezes Over (1994)	Farewell 1 Tour: Live from Melbourne (2005)	Live from The Forum MMXVIII (2020)

Farewell 1 Tour: Live from Melbourne is a double DVD by Eagles, released in 2005. It was filmed in Melbourne, Australia at the Rod Laver Arena on November 14, 15 and 17, 2004, featuring two new songs.

It is the first Eagles live video as a quartet without Don Felder, who was terminated from the band in 2001 (but it did feature four other backing musicians, along with a four-piece horn section). This would also mark the last Eagles live video with founding member Glenn Frey before his death in 2016.

The name 'Farewell Tour' has nothing to do with the band's plan to quit touring and this is confirmed by Glenn Frey's quote in the interview contained in the DVD: "The longer this goes on, the better these songs sound. There is a 'sort of' honesty in calling the tour Farewell 1, with its implication that Farewell 2 will follow soon."

The concert marks the band's first use of pre-recorded rhythm tracks, namely a track consisting of muted guitar strums on "Hotel California" (which were overdubbed on the original studio version, but were absent from previous live performances of the song) and a backing rhythm track for Don Henley's rendition of his fast-paced solo hit "The Boys of Summer". The two new songs included in the DVD are "One Day At A Time" (Walsh) and "No More Cloudy Days" (Frey).

In November 2006, the DVD was re-issued at Wal-Mart stores with a bonus 3-track CD which are teasers of the band's upcoming studio album. The tracks are a studio version of Frey's "No More Cloudy Days", the Henley/Frey penned rocker "Fast Company" and the Henley/Schmit/Smith penned ballad "Do Something".

The performance was first released in a high-definition 1080p/DTS 5.1 format as an HD DVD in 2005. In 2013, it was released as a single Blu-ray disc.

== Track listing ==
=== Disc One ===
1. "Opening Sequence" (Glenn Frey, Richard Davis)
2. "The Long Run" (Don Henley, Frey)
3. "New Kid in Town" (Henley, Frey, JD Souther)
4. "Wasted Time (Henley, Frey) / Wasted Time (Reprise)" (Henley, Frey, Jim Ed Norman)
5. "Peaceful Easy Feeling" (Jack Tempchin)
6. "I Can't Tell You Why" (Henley, Frey, Timothy B. Schmit)
7. "One of These Nights" (Frey, Henley)
8. "One Day at a Time" (new; Joe Walsh)
9. "Lyin' Eyes" (Frey, Henley)
10. "The Boys of Summer" (Mike Campbell, Henley)
11. "In the City" (Walsh, Barry De Vorzon)
12. "Already Gone" (Tempchin, Robb Stradlund) / Silent Spring (Intro) (Frey, Jay Oliver)
13. "Tequila Sunrise" (Frey, Henley)
14. "Love Will Keep Us Alive" (Jim Capaldi, Paul Carrack, Peter Vale)
15. "No More Cloudy Days" (new; Frey)
16. "Hole in the World" (Frey, Henley)
17. "Take It to the Limit" (Frey, Henley, Randy Meisner)
18. "You Belong to the City" (Frey, Tempchin)
19. "Walk Away" (Walsh)
20. "Sunset Grill" (Henley, Danny Kortchmar, Benmont Tench)

=== Disc Two ===
1. "Life's Been Good" (Walsh)
2. "Dirty Laundry" (Henley, Kortchmar)
3. "Funk #49" (Jim Fox, Dale Peters, Walsh)
4. "Heartache Tonight" (Frey, Henley, Bob Seger, Souther)
5. "Life in the Fast Lane" (Frey, Henley, Walsh)
6. "Hotel California" (Don Felder, Henley, Frey)
7. "Rocky Mountain Way" (Rocke Grace, Kenny Passarelli, Joe Vitale, Walsh)
8. "All She Wants to Do Is Dance" (Kortchmar)
9. "Take It Easy" (Jackson Browne, Frey)
10. "Desperado" (Frey, Henley)

== Personnel ==
=== Eagles ===
- Glenn Frey - rhythm and lead guitars, six and twelve-string acoustic guitars, piano, keyboards, organ, lead and backing vocals
- Don Henley - drums, percussion, electric and acoustic guitars, lead and backing vocals
- Joe Walsh - lead, rhythm and slide guitars, six and twelve-string acoustic guitars, keyboards, organ, lead and backing vocals
- Timothy B. Schmit - bass, lead and backing vocals

=== Touring musicians ===
- Scott Crago - drums, percussion, backing vocals, sound effects (e.g. car horns and brakes on "Life's Been Good" and clapping sounds on "Heartache Tonight")
- Will Hollis - keyboards, piano, backing vocals
- Michael Thompson - piano, keyboards, accordion, backing vocals
- Steuart Smith - lead, rhythm and slide guitars, double-neck electric guitar on "Hotel California", backing vocals
- Bill Armstrong - trumpet, backing vocals and snaps on "Hole in the World"
- Al Garth - saxophone, violin, percussion, backing vocals and snaps on "Hole in the World"
- Chris Mostert - tenor and alto saxophone, backing vocals and snaps on "Hole in the World"
- Greg Smith - baritone saxophone, backing vocals and snaps on "Hole in the World"

== Bonus DVD ==
- Behind the Scenes footage
- New Interviews
- A Glimpse Backstage
- Soundcheck

== Bonus CD included at Wal-Mart stores ==
1. "No More Cloudy Days" (Frey)
2. "Fast Company" (Henley/Frey)
3. "Do Something" (Henley/Schmit/Smith)

== Charts and certifications ==
Chart (2005)	Peak position
Australian Top 40 Music DVDs	1
Austrian Top 10 Music DVDs	4
Belgium (Flanders) Top 10 Music DVDs	5
Belgium (Wallonia) Top 10 Music DVDs	1
Danish Top 10 Music DVDs	5
Hungarian Top 20 DVDs	12
Italian Top 20 Music DVDs	1
Netherlands Top 30 Music DVDs	1
New Zealand Top 10 Music DVDs	1
Norwegian Top 10 DVDs	5
Portuguese Top 30 Music DVDs	6
Swedish Top 20 DVDs	1

Region	Certification	Certified units/sales
Australia (ARIA)	13× Platinum	195,000^{^}
Canada (Music Canada)	Diamond	100,000^{^}
France (SNEP)	Platinum	20,000^{*}
Germany (BVMI)	Platinum	50,000^{^}
New Zealand (RMNZ)	6× Platinum	30,000^{^}
United Kingdom (BPI)	2× Platinum	100,000^{^}
United States (RIAA)	30× Platinum	1,556,000
^{*} Sales figures based on certification alone.^{^} Shipments figures based on certification alone.
