= Eagles Greatest Hits =

Eagles Greatest Hits may refer to:

- Their Greatest Hits (1971–1975), 1976
- Eagles Greatest Hits Volume 2, 1982
- The Very Best of the Eagles, 1994
- The Very Best Of (Eagles album), 2003

== See also ==
- Eagles discography
