= The Very Best Of (Eagles album) =

2003 greatest hits album by the Eagles

Greatest hits album by Eagles
- Released: October 21, 2003
- Recorded: 1972–2003
- Genre: Rock
- Length: 144:54
- Label: Warner Strategic Marketing
- Producer: Glyn Johns, Bill Szymczyk, Eagles, Elliot Scheiner and Rob Jacobs

Eagles chronology
Selected Works: 1972–1999 (2000)	The Very Best Of (2003)	Eagles (2005)

Professional ratings
Review scores
Source	Rating
AllMusic	4.5/5 stars
Rolling Stone	4/5 stars

The Very Best Of (released as The Complete Greatest Hits in the UK, Australia, and New Zealand) is a two-disc compilation album by the Eagles, released in 2003. This album combines all tracks that appeared on the two previously released Eagles greatest hits albums (Their Greatest Hits (1971–1975) and Eagles Greatest Hits, Vol. 2), along with other singles not included on the first two compilations, album tracks, and the new track "Hole in the World".

The accompanying booklet to The Very Best Of features commentaries on all of the songs from Glenn Frey and Don Henley, as compiled by Cameron Crowe.

The Very Best Of was also released as a limited-edition three-disc set with the third disc being a bonus DVD containing the video for the new song "Hole in the World", as well as a making of the video featurette and "Backstage Pass to Farewell 1."

== Artwork ==
The artwork for the cover, a horse skull with feathers, is by Boyd Elder. Elder also produced the skull artwork for the Eagles' 1975 album One of These Nights and their compilation album Their Greatest Hits (1971–1975).

== Commercial performance ==
The album debuted on the Billboard 200 on November 8, 2003, at number 3, with 162,000 copies sold. It spent 62 weeks on the chart. The album was certified and awarded gold, platinum, and double platinum records by the RIAA on December 17, 2003, and on December 13, 2004, it achieved triple platinum status. The album has sold over 5 million units in the United States.

As of December 2007, it has spent over 325 weeks in the Irish Album Charts, effectively not having left the chart since its release. In the UK the album (as The Complete Greatest Hits) entered the charts on November 1, 2003, at its initial number 27 peak position, re-entering the charts in June 2006 when it peaked at number 9 on the UK Albums Chart.

== Track listing ==
Disc one
No.	Title	Writer(s)	Length
1.	"Take It Easy"	Jackson Browne, Glenn Frey	3:29
2.	"Witchy Woman"	Don Henley, Bernie Leadon	4:10
3.	"Peaceful Easy Feeling"	Jack Tempchin	4:16
4.	"Desperado"	Henley, Frey	3:33
5.	"Tequila Sunrise"	Henley, Frey	2:52
6.	"Doolin-Dalton"	Browne, Frey, Henley, JD Souther	3:26
7.	"Already Gone"	Tempchin, Robb Strandlund	4:13
8.	"Best of My Love"	Henley, Frey, Souther	4:35
9.	"James Dean"	Browne, Frey, Souther, Henley	3:36
10.	"Ol' '55"	Tom Waits	4:22
11.	"Midnight Flyer"	Paul Craft	3:58
12.	"On the Border"	Henley, Leadon, Frey	4:28
13.	"Lyin' Eyes"	Henley, Frey	6:21
14.	"One of These Nights"	Henley, Frey	4:51
15.	"Take It to the Limit"	Randy Meisner, Henley, Frey	4:48
16.	"After the Thrill Is Gone"	Henley, Frey	3:56
17.	"Hotel California"	Don Felder, Henley, Frey	6:30
Total length:			1:13:24

- Tracks 1–3 from Eagles (1972)
- Tracks 4–6 from Desperado (1973)
- Tracks 7–12 from On the Border (1974)
- Tracks 13–16 from One of These Nights (1975)
- Track 17 from Hotel California (1976)

Disc two
No.	Title	Writer(s)	Length
1.	"Life in the Fast Lane"	Joe Walsh, Henley, Frey	4:46
2.	"Wasted Time"	Henley, Frey	4:55
3.	"Victim of Love"	Felder, Souther, Henley, Frey	4:11
4.	"The Last Resort"	Henley, Frey	7:25
5.	"New Kid in Town"	Souther, Henley, Frey	5:04
6.	"Please Come Home for Christmas"	Charles Brown, Gene Redd	2:58
7.	"Heartache Tonight"	Henley, Frey, Bob Seger, Souther	4:26
8.	"The Sad Café"	Henley, Frey, Walsh, Souther	5:35
9.	"I Can't Tell You Why"	Timothy B. Schmit, Henley, Frey	4:56
10.	"The Long Run"	Henley, Frey	3:42
11.	"In the City"	Walsh, Barry De Vorzon	3:46
12.	"Those Shoes"	Felder, Henley, Frey	4:56
13.	"Seven Bridges Road" (Live)	Steve Young	3:02
14.	"Love Will Keep Us Alive"	Pete Vale, Jim Capaldi, Paul Carrack	4:00
15.	"Get Over It"	Henley, Frey	3:29
16.	"Hole in the World"	Henley, Frey	4:19
Total length:			1:11:30

- Tracks 1–5 from Hotel California (1976)
- Track 6 was a non-album single (1978)
- Tracks 7–12 from The Long Run (1979)
- Track 13 from Eagles Live (1980)
- Tracks 14 and 15 from Hell Freezes Over (1994)
- Track 16 is a new track (2003)

== Personnel ==
- Glenn Frey – guitars, slide guitar, piano, keyboards, percussion, vocals
- Don Henley – drums, percussion, guitars, vocals
- Randy Meisner – bass guitar, guitars, guitarrone, vocals (disc one and songs 1–5 on disc two)
- Bernie Leadon – guitars, slide guitar, banjo, mandolin, pedal steel guitar, vocals (songs 1–16 on disc one)
- Don Felder – guitars, slide guitar, steel guitar, keyboards, synthesizers, vocals (songs 7, 13–17 on disc one and songs 1–15 on disc two)
- Joe Walsh – guitars, slide guitar, keyboards, organ, synthesizer, vocals (song 17 on disc one and all of disc two)
- Timothy B. Schmit – bass guitar, vocals (songs 6–16 on disc two), lead vocals (songs 9 and 14 on disc two)

Additional personnel

- Steuart Smith – guitars (song 16 on disc two)
- Scott Crago – drums, percussion (songs 14–16 on disc two)
- Will Hollis – piano (songs 14–16 on disc two)
- Jim Ed Norman – piano, string arrangements (songs 4, 13, 15 on disc one and songs 2, 4 on disc two)
- Jay Oliver – keyboards
- David Sanborn – alto saxophone (song 8 on disc two)
- Al Perkins – pedal steel guitar (song 10 on disc one)
- Sid Sharp – comcertmaster

== Production ==
- Producers: Glyn Johns, Bill Szymczyk, Eagles, Elliot Scheiner and Rob Jacobs
- Engineers: Allan Blazek, Michael Braunstein, Glyn Johns, Ed Mashal, Bill Szymczyk, Michael Verdick, Ken Villeneuve, and Don Wood
- Assistant engineers: Allan Blazek, Howard Kilgour, Tom Trafalski,
- Remastering: Ted Jensen
- String arrangements: Jim Ed Norman

== Charts ==
=== Weekly charts ===
Chart (2003)	Peak position
Austrian Albums (Ö3 Austria)	43
Dutch Albums (Album Top 100)	29
German Albums (Offizielle Top 100)	56
Italian Albums (FIMI)	34
Norwegian Albums (VG-lista)	29
Swedish Albums (Sverigetopplistan)	8
Swiss Albums (Schweizer Hitparade)	71
US Billboard 200	3

Chart (2006)	Peak position
UK Albums (OCC)	9

Chart (2007)	Peak position
New Zealand Albums (RMNZ)	5
US Top Catalog Albums (Billboard)	1

Chart (2016)	Peak position
Australian Albums (ARIA)	10

Chart (2022)	Peak position
Irish Albums (OCC)	11

=== Year-end charts ===
Chart (2004)	Position
US Billboard 200	72
Chart (2006)	Position
UK Albums (OCC)	159

== Certifications ==
Region	Certification	Certified units/sales
Australia (ARIA)	4× Platinum	280,000^{^}
Canada (Music Canada)	2× Platinum	200,000^{^}
Italy (FIMI) sales since 2009	Gold	25,000^{*}
Netherlands (NVPI)	Platinum	80,000^{^}
New Zealand (RMNZ)	2× Platinum	30,000^{^}
Spain (Promusicae)	Gold	50,000^{^}
United Kingdom (BPI)	3× Platinum	900,000^{‡}
United States (RIAA)	5× Platinum	5,000,000^{^}
Summaries
Europe (IFPI)	2× Platinum	2,000,000^{*}
^{*} Sales figures based on certification alone.^{^} Shipments figures based on certification alone.^{‡} Sales+streaming figures based on certification alone.

== See also ==
- List of best-selling albums in Australia
