= Long Road Out of Eden =

Studio album by Eagles
- Released: October 30, 2007
- Recorded: 2001–2007
- Genre: Rock
- Length: 90:46
- Labels: Eagles Recording Company II; Lost Highway; Polydor
- Producers: Eagles; Steuart Smith; Richard F.W. Davis; Scott Crago; Bill Szymczyk

Eagles chronology
Eagles (2005)	Long Road Out of Eden (2007)	Live from the Forum MMXVIII (2020)

Professional ratings
Aggregate scores
Source	Rating
Metacritic	60/100
Review scores
Source	Rating
AllMusic	3/5 stars
Blender	2/5 stars
Entertainment Weekly	B
The Guardian	1/5 stars
Los Angeles Times	3/4 stars
Mojo	2/5 stars
Q	2/5 stars
Rolling Stone	3.5/5 stars
Slant Magazine	2/5 stars
Uncut	4/5 stars

Long Road Out of Eden is the seventh studio album by American rock band the Eagles, released in 2007 on Lost Highway Records as their first ever double album. Nearly six years in production, it is the band's first studio album since 1979's The Long Run. In between that time the band recorded four original studio tracks for the live album Hell Freezes Over (1994), "Hole in the World" for The Very Best Of (2003) and the Joe Walsh-penned "One Day at a Time" for the Farewell 1 Tour: Live from Melbourne DVD (2005), which Walsh later re-recorded for his 2012 album Analog Man.

It is the band's first album released following the dismissal of Don Felder in 2001, as well as their final album with Glenn Frey before his death in 2016.

The album produced two singles on the Hot Country Songs charts: a cover of JD Souther's "How Long" and "Busy Being Fabulous", both of which were Top 30 hits on the country charts as well as Top 20 hits on the Hot Adult Contemporary Tracks charts. The album produced five straight hits on the Hot Adult Contemporary Tracks charts with "How Long", "Busy Being Fabulous", "No More Cloudy Days", "What Do I Do With My Heart", and "I Don't Want to Hear Anymore".

The album debuted at No. 1 in the US after a last-minute rule change by Billboard (which also blocked Britney Spears' highly anticipated Blackout from topping the chart) and won the band two Grammy awards for "How Long" and the instrumental "I Dreamed There Was No War". The album became the band's sixth consecutive No. 1 album, and was the highest selling album of the year. It has since sold 3.5 million copies in the US alone. Being a double album with length exceeding 90 minutes, the album was certified 7× Platinum by the Recording Industry Association of America for shipments of 3.5 million albums.

== Album information ==
According to Henley, Bill Szymczyk, who had produced their previous albums, was a producer on the album, although Henley described Szymczyk's role as that of "a mediator, a consigliere, a ringmaster" since they (Frey and Henley) had already learned how to produce records themselves.

Three studio versions of songs from Long Road Out of Eden: "No More Cloudy Days", "Do Something" and "Fast Company" were first released in 2006 in a bonus CD of a special edition exclusive to Wal-Mart of the DVD release, Farewell 1 Tour-Live from Melbourne.

On August 20, 2007, the song "How Long", written by JD Souther – who had previously worked with the Eagles co-writing some of their biggest hits including "Best of My Love", "Victim of Love", "Heartache Tonight" and "New Kid in Town" – was released as a single to radio with an accompanying online video at Yahoo! Music and debuted on television on CMT during the Top 20 Countdown on August 23, 2007. The band performed the song as part of their live sets in the early to mid-1970s, but did not record it at the time due to Souther's desire to use it on his first solo album.

The deluxe collector's edition of Long Road Out of Eden was released on November 20, 2007, featuring two bonus tracks, "Hole in the World" and "Please Come Home for Christmas". This version of the CD is wrapped in a red linen cloth, screen printed with panoramic imagery, and includes a 40-page booklet with lyrics, credits, exclusive photos and desert scenes from the making of the "How Long" video.

"No More Walks in the Wood" is a song using the words from "An Old-Fashioned Song", a 21-line poem (without choruses either in the poem or song) by John Hollander. The song is in four-part harmony with guitar chords, but mostly sung a cappella.

In a 2007 interview with CNN, band member Don Henley declared, "This is probably the last Eagles album that we'll ever make." When questioned about the possibility of a follow-up album in November 2010, band member Timothy B. Schmit said, "My first reaction would be: no way. But I said that before the last one, so you never really know. Bands are a fragile entity and you never know what's going to happen. It took a long time to do that last album, over a span of years, really, and it took a lot out of us. We took a year off at one point. I'm not sure if we're able to do that again. I wouldn't close the door on it, but I don't know." In a 2010 interview with undercover.fm, Joe Walsh said that the band might be able to make one more album before the band "wraps it up".

At the 2009 Grammy Awards, the album won Best Pop Instrumental Performance and was nominated for three more: Best Pop Vocal Album; Best Pop Performance by a Duo or Group With Vocals for "Waiting in the Weeds"; and Best Rock Performance by a Duo or Group With Vocals for "Long Road Out of Eden".

Joe Walsh previously recorded "Guilty of the Crime" for the 1995 soundtrack album A Future to This Life: Robocop – The Series Soundtrack.

In 2009, "I Don't Want to Hear Any More" was released as the fifth single from the album. The song's writer Paul Carrack had already cut his own version, with Henley and Schmit singing backing vocals, in 2007.

For the first year after the album's initial release, the album was available in North America exclusively via the band's website, or through Wal-Mart and Sam's Club retail stores. It became the first account-exclusive album to reach number 1. The album blocked Britney Spears' Blackout from hitting number one, ending her record-breaking streak of number-one albums as all previous four opened at the helm.

== Track listing ==
Disc one
No.	Title	Writer(s)	Lead vocals	Length
1.	"No More Walks in the Wood"	Don Henley; Steuart Smith; John Hollander	Don Henley, Glenn Frey, Joe Walsh, and Timothy B. Schmit	2:00
2.	"How Long"	JD Souther	Frey with Henley	3:16
3.	"Busy Being Fabulous"	Henley; Glenn Frey	Henley	4:20
4.	"What Do I Do with My Heart"	Henley; Frey	Frey with Henley	3:54
5.	"Guilty of the Crime"	Frankie Miller; Jerry Lynn Williams	Walsh	3:43
6.	"I Don't Want to Hear Any More"	Paul Carrack	Schmit	4:21
7.	"Waiting in the Weeds"	Henley; Smith	Henley	7:46
8.	"No More Cloudy Days"	Frey	Frey	4:03
9.	"Fast Company"	Henley; Frey	Henley	4:00
10.	"Do Something"	Henley; Timothy B. Schmit; Smith	Schmit with Henley	5:12
11.	"You Are Not Alone"	Frey	Frey	2:24
Total length:				44:59

Disc two
No.	Title	Writer(s)	Lead vocals	Length
1.	"Long Road Out of Eden"	Henley; Frey; Schmit	Henley	10:17
2.	"I Dreamed There Was No War"	Frey	Instrumental	1:37
3.	"Somebody"	Jack Tempchin; John Brannen	Frey	4:09
4.	"Frail Grasp on the Big Picture"	Henley; Frey; Smith	Henley	5:46
5.	"Last Good Time in Town"	Joe Walsh; Souther	Walsh	7:07
6.	"I Love to Watch a Woman Dance"	Larry John McNally	Frey	3:16
7.	"Business as Usual"	Henley; Smith	Henley	5:31
8.	"Center of the Universe"	Henley; Frey; Smith	Henley	3:42
9.	"It's Your World Now"	Frey; Tempchin	Frey	4:22
Total length:				45:47

Deluxe collector's edition/Standard UK edition
No.	Title	Writer(s)	Length
10.	"Hole in the World"	Henley, Frey	4:13
11.	"Please Come Home for Christmas" (not included on standard UK edition)	Charles Mose Brown, Gene C. Redd	2:58
Total length:			97:57

== Personnel ==
As listed in CD booklet.

Eagles

- Glenn Frey – vocals, guitars, keyboards, bass guitar
- Don Henley – vocals, drums, percussion, guitars
- Joe Walsh – vocals, guitars, keyboards
- Timothy B. Schmit – vocals, bass guitar

Additional personnel

- Steuart Smith – guitar, keyboards, mandolin
- Scott Crago – drums, percussion
- Richard F.W. Davis – keyboards, programming
- Michael Thompson – keyboards, accordion, trombone
- Will Hollis – keyboards
- Al Garth – alto saxophone, violin
- Bill Armstrong – trumpet
- Chris Mostert – tenor and alto saxophone
- Greg Smith – baritone saxophone
- Greg Leisz – pedal steel
- Lenny Castro – percussion
- Luis Conte – percussion
- Orchestrations by Richard F.W. Davis and Glenn Frey
- Horns arranged by Greg Smith and Don Henley

Production

- Produced by Eagles
- Co-Producers: Steuart Smith, Richard F.W. Davis, Scott Crago and Bill Szymczyk
- Engineering: Chris Bell, Mike Terry, Jim Nipar and Mike Harlow
- Additional Engineering: Andy Ackland
- Mixed by Elliot Scheiner at The Doghouse, Los Angeles, California
- Digital editing: Blade
- Recorded at The Doghouse, Los Angeles, California and Samhain Sound, Malibu, California
- Additional Studios:
  - O’Henry Studios, Burbank, California
  - Henson Recording Studios, Hollywood, California
  - Mooselodge, Calabasas, California
  - The Panhandle House, Denton, Texas
  - Luminous Sound, Dallas, Texas
- Mastered by Bob Ludwig at Gateway Mastering, Portland, Maine
- Art direction and Design: Jeri Heiden
- Logo: Nick Steinhardt / Smog Design
- Photography: Olaf Heine

== Charts ==
=== Weekly charts ===
Weekly chart performance for Long Road Out of Eden
Chart (2007-2008)	Peak position
Australian Albums (ARIA)	1
Austrian Albums (Ö3 Austria)	2
Belgian Albums (Ultratop Flanders)	8
Belgian Albums (Ultratop Wallonia)	7
Danish Albums (Hitlisten)	2
Dutch Albums (Album Top 100)	1
Finnish Albums (Suomen virallinen lista)	6
French Albums (SNEP)	9
German Albums (Offizielle Top 100)	2
Greek Albums (IFPI)	1
Icelandic Albums (Tónlistinn)	2
Irish Albums (IRMA)	4
Italian Albums (FIMI)	4
Japanese Albums (Oricon)	7
New Zealand Albums (RMNZ)	1
Norwegian Albums (VG-lista)	1
Scottish Albums (Official Charts)	1
Spanish Albums (Promusicae)	13
Swedish Albums (Sverigetopplistan)	2
Swiss Albums (Schweizer Hitparade)	2
Taiwanese Albums (Five Music)	1
UK Albums (Official Charts)	1
US Billboard 200	1
US Top Country Albums (Billboard)	1
US Top Rock Albums (Billboard)	1

2021 weekly chart performance for Long Road Out of Eden
Chart (2021)	Peak position
Hungarian Albums (MAHASZ)	33

=== Year-end charts ===
2007 year-end chart performance for Long Road Out of Eden
Chart (2007)	Position
Australian Albums (ARIA)	8
Austrian Albums (Ö3 Austria)	62
Belgian Albums (Ultratop Wallonia)	95
Dutch Albums (Album Top 100)	15
French Albums (SNEP)	162
German Albums (Offizielle Top 100)	78
New Zealand Albums (RMNZ)	3
Swedish Albums (Sverigetopplistan)	16
Swiss Albums (Schweizer Hitparade)	31
UK Albums (OCC)	6
US Billboard 200	38
US Top Country Albums (Billboard)	7

2008 year-end chart performance for Long Road Out of Eden
Chart (2008)	Position
Australian Albums (ARIA)	93
Dutch Albums (Album Top 100)	58
German Albums (Offizielle Top 100)	95
Swedish Albums (Sverigetopplistan)	66
UK Albums (OCC)	116
US Billboard 200	4
US Top Country Albums (Billboard)	1
US Top Rock Albums (Billboard)	2

== Certifications and sales ==
Certifications and sales for Long Road Out of Eden
Region	Certification	Certified units/sales
Australia (ARIA)	3× Platinum	210,000^{^}
Austria (IFPI Austria)	Platinum	20,000^{*}
Belgium (BRMA)	Gold	15,000^{*}
Denmark (IFPI Danmark)	Platinum	30,000^{^}
Finland (Musiikkituottajat)	Gold	15,983
Germany (BVMI)	Gold	100,000^{^}
Ireland (IRMA)	Platinum	15,000^{^}
Korea	—	2,597
Netherlands (NVPI)	Platinum	70,000^{^}
New Zealand (RMNZ)	3× Platinum	45,000^{^}
Poland (ZPAV)	Platinum	20,000^{*}
Russia (NFPF)	Gold	10,000^{*}
Sweden (GLF)	Platinum	40,000^{^}
Switzerland (IFPI Switzerland)	Gold	15,000^{^}
United Kingdom (BPI)	2× Platinum	600,000^{^}
United States (RIAA)	7× Platinum	7,000,000^{^}
^{*} Sales figures based on certification alone.^{^} Shipments figures based on certification alone.

== Awards ==
=== Wins ===
Awards for Long Road Out of Eden
Year	Winner	Category	Award
2008	Long Road Out of Eden	Best International Rock Album	Fonogram – Hungarian Music Awards
2008	"How Long"	Best Country Performance by a Duo or Group with Vocals	Grammy Awards (50th)
2009	"I Dreamed There Was No War"	Best Pop Instrumental Performance	Grammy Awards (51st)

=== Nominations ===
Nominations for Long Road Out of Eden
Year	Nominee	Category	Award
2004	"Hole in the World"	Best Pop Performance by a Duo or Group with Vocals	Grammy Awards (46th)
2008	Long Road Out of Eden	Best International Album	BRIT Awards (28th)
2008	Eagles	Best International Group	BRIT Awards (28th)
2008	"How Long"	Wide Open Country Video of the Year	CMT Music Awards
2008	Eagles	Top Vocal Group	Academy of Country Music Awards
2009	Long Road Out of Eden	Best Pop Vocal Album	Grammy Awards (51st)
2009	“Long Road Out of Eden”	Best Rock Performance by a Duo or Group with Vocals	Grammy Awards (51st)
2009	"Waiting in the Weeds"	Best Pop Performance by a Duo or Group with Vocals	Grammy Awards (51st)
