= Their Greatest Hits (1971–1975) =

Greatest hits album by the Eagles
- Released: February 17, 1976
- Genre: Rock • folk rock
- Length: 43:08
- Label: Asylum
- Producers: Glyn Johns; Bill Szymczyk

The Eagles chronology
One of These Nights (1975)	Their Greatest Hits (1971–1975) (1976)	Hotel California (1976)

Their Greatest Hits (1971–1975) is the first compilation album by the American rock band the Eagles, released by Asylum Records on February 17, 1976. It contains a selection of songs from the band's first four albums, which were released from 1972 to 1975. On the U.S. Billboard 200 chart, the album reached number 1, where it stayed for five weeks.

The album has the distinction of being the first album to receive a Recording Industry Association of America (RIAA) Platinum certification, which was introduced in 1976 to recognize albums that ship at least one million copies in the United States. It was ranked number four on Billboard's year-end album chart for 1976, and in September 2025, it broke the 500-week mark (non-consecutive). The RIAA has certified the album 40 times Platinum, indicating sales of 40 million copies in the United States alone, which would make Their Greatest Hits (1971–1975) the best-selling album of the 20th century in the United States (it was surpassed in Platinum certifications by Michael Jackson's Thriller after Jackson's death in 2009, but regained the title in August 2018). In 2016, the album was selected by the Library of Congress for preservation in the National Recording Registry as being "culturally, historically, or aesthetically significant".

== Background ==
Their Greatest Hits (1971–1975) comprises nine singles released between 1972 and 1975, plus the album track "Desperado". All of the singles except "Tequila Sunrise" had charted in the top 40 of the Billboard Hot 100, and five had reached the top ten. "One of These Nights" and "Best of My Love" had both topped the chart.

Irving Azoff, the manager of the Eagles, said: "We decided it was time to put out the first greatest-hits because we had enough hits." According to Don Felder, however, none of the band members had any say in the decision to release the compilation album, which they complained was "nothing more than a ploy by the record company to sell product without having to pay additional production costs". Don Henley was unhappy that songs like "Tequila Sunrise" and "Desperado" were lifted out of the context of the original album in a way that he thought was detrimental to the nature, quality, and meaning of the music. He said: "All the record company was worried about were their quarterly reports. They didn't give a shit whether the greatest hits album was good or not, they just wanted product." Despite being unhappy with the album's release, the band nevertheless reasoned that it gave them more time to work on the Hotel California album, which was released later in 1976.

== Artwork ==
The cover of the album is a photograph of a piece of art created by artist Boyd Elder (aka "El Chingadero"), whose work was also used for the cover of One of These Nights. The piece consists of a painted plastic cast of an eagle skull against a light-blue background made of silver mylar. The bumpy appearance of the background gave rise to a myth that it was covered in cocaine powder that the band snorted after the photo shoot. The band chose not to debunk that myth, though Glenn Frey reportedly also noticed the resemblance and told Elder that the background reminded him of "a field of blow" (a slang term for cocaine). The artist was paid $5,000 for his work on the cover.

As with One of These Nights, the original vinyl editions of Their Greatest Hits (1971–1975) featured messages printed onto the inner dead wax. In this case, "Happy New Year, Glyn" and "With Love from Bill" appear on sides one and two, respectively.

== Critical reception ==
Professional ratings
Review scores
Source	Rating
AllMusic	5/5 stars
Christgau's Record Guide	B
The Daily Vault	A
The Rolling Stone Album Guide	5/5 stars
Pitchfork	8.1/10

William Ruhlmann of AllMusic said the songs in the compilation are melodic, immediately engaging, and lyrically consistent, so, "unlike the albums from which they come, these songs make up a collection consistent in mood and identity, which may help explain why Their Greatest Hits (1971–1975) works so much better than the band's previous discs and practically makes them redundant. No wonder it was such a big hit out of the box".

In a 1978 poll of 50 rock critics and DJs organized by Paul Gambaccini, the album was ranked number 141. It was voted by the public as the sixth best compilation album in the 1994 edition of All Time Top 1000 Albums.

== Commercial performance ==
Their Greatest Hits (1971–1975) debuted at number 4 on the U.S. Billboard 200 album chart and reached number 1 the following week, where it stayed for five weeks. It ranked number 4 on Billboard's year-end album chart for 1976, and has been in and out of the Billboard 200 ever since. In September 2025 it reached its 500th non-consecutive week. Of its 465 weeks on the Billboard Top Pop Catalog Albums chart, during which it was not eligible for the main album chart, the compilation spent 15 non-consecutive weeks at number one.

The album has the distinction of being the first album to receive the RIAA's Platinum certification, which was introduced in 1976 to recognize albums that ship one million copies in the United States. It received its first Platinum certification a week after its release (on February 24, 1976), was certified 12 times Platinum in August 1990, 14 times Platinum in 1993, and 22 times Platinum in 1995. On November 10, 1999, the album became the best-selling album of the 20th century in the United States when it was certified 26 times Platinum. In a 2001 radio interview, Randy Meisner said neither he nor Bernie Leadon were notified of the 1999 certification, "so we had to call and we finally received it." The album was certified 29 times Platinum on January 30, 2006, and, in August 2018, it was certified 38 times Platinum under a new system that tallies album and track sales as well as streams, surpassing Michael Jackson's Thriller (certified 34 times Platinum) to again become the highest-certified album by the RIAA. In January 2026, Their Greatest Hits (1971–1975) became the first album in US history to be certified 4 times Diamond for selling over 40 million units alone in the country.

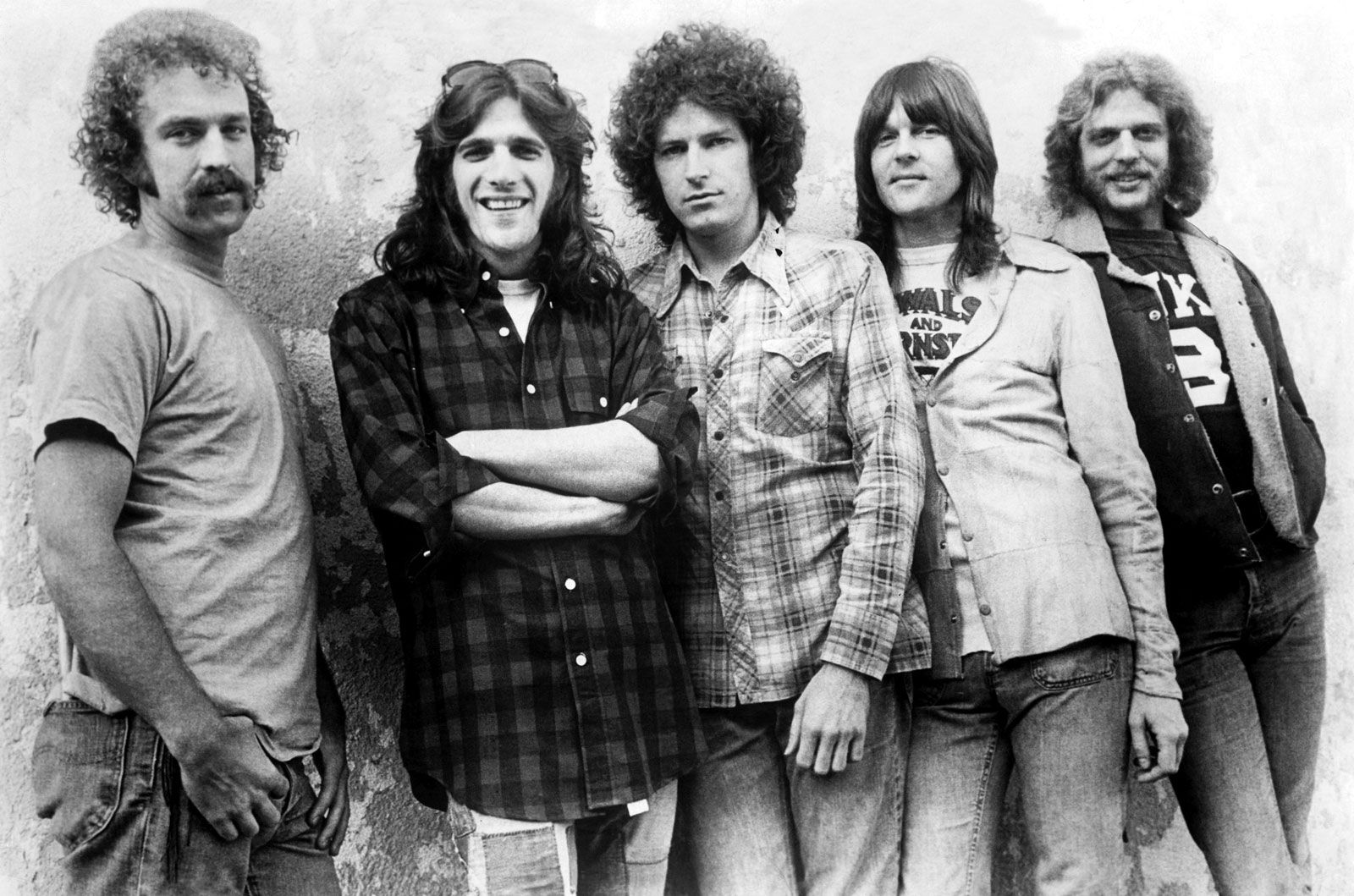
Eagles c. 1974: left to right Bernie Leadon, Glenn Frey, Don Henley, Randy Meisner, Don Felder, the band that recorded the songs presented on this album.

There is skepticism of the album's RIAA certifications. The additional certifications it received in 1995 indicate it had sold eight million units since 1993. However, per Nielsen SoundScan, it sold fewer than a million copies during that period, as well as just over five (rather than 17) million copies from 1991 (when SoundScan began tracking) to 2006, and 6.4 million album-equivalent units from 1991 to February 2020. In 2018, Sony Music CEO Rob Stringer stated the album only sold 2.3 million units from 2006 to 2018, yet it received certifications for nine million additional units.

When asked about the discrepancy between the certification increases and Nielsen SoundScan data, the RIAA did not provide a clear explanation, but later confirmed that Warner Music had conducted a full audit of the Eagles’ sales history, recounting past shipments dating back to 1976. The album was initially certified Platinum in 1976 and 12× Platinum in 1990, but was reassessed in 1994, which retroactively added 8 million units and increased the certification to 22× Platinum—despite SoundScan recording only about 1 million new sales during that period. Another reassessment took place in 2018, adding another 9 million units and increased the album’s certification to 38× Platinum, surpassing Thriller as the highest-certified album in U.S. history. Both the 1994 and 2018 retrospective audits included units dating before point-of-sale figures reported by Nielsen SoundScan. In response to the situation, a representative from Michael Jackson's estate noted sales audits are usually restricted to three years and said, "The notion that they can go back 10, 15, 20 or 30 years and find units that were never counted before is absurd, they reviewed these records before. Why didn't they find those uncounted records then?"

Worldwide, the album has sold nearly 45 million copies as of 2020, making it the best-selling greatest hits album, and the fourth best-selling album, of all time.

== Track listing ==
Side one
No.	Title	Writer(s)	Lead vocals	Length
1.	"Take It Easy" (from Eagles, 1972)	Glenn Frey; Jackson Browne	Frey	3:29
2.	"Witchy Woman" (from Eagles)	Don Henley; Bernie Leadon	Henley	4:10
3.	"Lyin' Eyes" (from One of These Nights, 1975)	Don Henley; Glenn Frey	Frey	6:21
4.	"Already Gone" (from On the Border, 1974)	Robb Strandlund; Jack Tempchin	Frey	4:13
5.	"Desperado" (from Desperado, 1973)	Don Henley; Glenn Frey	Henley	3:33

Side two
No.	Title	Writer(s)	Lead vocals	Length
1.	"One of These Nights" (from One of These Nights)	Don Henley; Glenn Frey	Henley	4:51
2.	"Tequila Sunrise" (from Desperado)	Don Henley; Glenn Frey	Frey	2:52
3.	"Take It to the Limit" (from One of These Nights)	Randy Meisner; Don Henley; Glenn Frey	Meisner	4:48
4.	"Peaceful Easy Feeling" (from Eagles)	Jack Tempchin	Frey	4:16
5.	"Best of My Love" (from On the Border)	Don Henley; Glenn Frey; JD Souther	Henley	4:35

== Personnel ==
Eagles

- Glenn Frey – guitars, vocals; piano
- Bernie Leadon – guitars, backing vocals; banjo, pedal steel, mandolin
- Randy Meisner – bass guitar, vocals
- Don Henley – drums, vocals
- Don Felder – guitars, organ on "Lyin' Eyes", "Already Gone", "One of These Nights", and "Take It to the Limit"

Production

- Glyn Johns – producer
- Bill Szymczyk – producer
- Jim Ed Norman – string arrangements
- Allan Blazek – engineer
- Michael Braunstein – engineer
- Howard Kilgour – engineer
- Ed Mashal – engineer
- Michael Verdick – engineer
- Don Wood – engineer
- Henry Diltz – art direction, design
- Glen Christensen – art direction, design
- Boyd Elder – art direction, design
- Gary Burden – cover art, lettering, art direction, design
- Tom Kelley Jr – cover photograph
- Irving Azoff – direction
- Steve Hoffman – digital remastering
- Ted Jensen – digital remastering

== Charts ==
=== Weekly charts ===
Weekly chart performance for Their Greatest Hits (1971–1975)
Chart (1976–2018)	Peak position
Australian Albums (Kent Music Report)	3
Canada Top Albums/CDs (RPM)	1
Canadian Albums (Billboard)	1
Japanese Albums (Oricon)	35
New Zealand Albums (RMNZ)	2
Norwegian Albums (VG-lista)	8
Swedish Albums (Sverigetopplistan)	31
UK Albums (Official Charts)	2
US Billboard 200	1
US Top Rock Albums (Billboard)	11

=== Year-end charts ===
Year-end chart performance for Their Greatest Hits (1971–1975)
Chart (1976)	Position
Australia Albums (Kent Music Report)	7
Canada Top Albums/CDs (RPM)	5
New Zealand Albums (RMNZ)	6
UK Albums (OCC)	8
US Billboard 200	4
Chart (1977)	Position
Canada Top Albums/CDs (RPM)	56
New Zealand Albums (RMNZ)	20
UK Albums (OCC)	23
US Billboard 200	12
Chart (2016)	Position
US Billboard 200	146
Chart (2017)	Position
US Top Rock Albums (Billboard)	48
Chart (2018)	Position
US Top Rock Albums (Billboard)	25
Chart (2019)	Position
US Billboard 200	132
US Top Rock Albums (Billboard)	22
Chart (2020)	Position
US Billboard 200	116
US Top Rock Albums (Billboard)	12
Chart (2021)	Position
US Top Rock Albums (Billboard)	28
Chart (2022)	Position
US Billboard 200	194
US Top Rock Albums (Billboard)	37
Chart (2023)	Position
US Billboard 200	180
US Top Rock Albums (Billboard)	43
Chart (2024)	Position
US Billboard 200	187

== Certifications ==
Certifications for Their Greatest Hits (1971–1975)
Region	Certification	Certified units/sales
Australia (ARIA)	8× Platinum	560,000^{^}
Canada (Music Canada)	2× Diamond	2,000,000^{^}
Hong Kong (IFPI Hong Kong)	Platinum	20,000^{*}
United Kingdom (BPI)	Platinum	300,000^{^}
United States (RIAA)	4× Diamond	40,000,000^{‡}
Summaries
Worldwide	—	45,000,000
^{*} Sales figures based on certification alone.^{^} Shipments figures based on certification alone.^{‡} Sales+streaming figures based on certification alone.

== See also ==
- List of best-selling albums
- List of best-selling albums in the United States
