= Busy Being Fabulous =

Single by Eagles

from the album Long Road Out of Eden
- Released: January 2008 (U.S.)
- Genre: Rock
- Length: 4:17
- Label: Lost Highway
- Songwriters: Don Henley, Glenn Frey
- Producers: Eagles, Steuart Smith, Richard F. W. Davis, Scott Crago, Bill Szymczyk

Eagles singles chronology
"How Long" (2007)	"Busy Being Fabulous" (2008)	"What Do I Do with My Heart" (2008)

"Busy Being Fabulous" is the second single by the American rock band Eagles from their 2007 album Long Road out of Eden. Released in January 2008, it is their third Top 40 hit on the Billboard Hot Country Songs charts.

== Song ==
The song features Don Henley on lead vocals, and lyrically describes a strained love life between a frustrated male and a female who spends far too much time trying to climb the social ladder, hence the lyric "You were just too busy being fabulous/Too busy to think about us".

== Video ==
The video for the song was released to YouTube in early February, and features the band performing the song at a party in suits. Interspersed with the performance is the story of the song as it happens, featuring the band playing several different roles at once:

- Timothy B. Schmit as a waiter
- Glenn Frey as a bartender
- Joe Walsh as a policeman/security guard. His sidekick is a monkey.
- Don Henley as a party goer.

The video also marks the first time Steuart Smith has appeared in any Eagles video. The band's backup drummer, Scott F. Crago, also appears in the band's party performance. And it is also the band's last music video to feature their founding member Glenn Frey before his death in January 2016.

== Chart performance ==
"Busy Being Fabulous" entered the Billboard Hot Country Songs charts at number 48 on the chart week of February 9, 2008. It reached a peak of number 28 on the week of March 22 before falling the next week.

=== Weekly charts ===
Chart (2008)	Peak position
Romania (Romanian Top 100)	89
US Adult Contemporary (Billboard)	12
US Hot Country Songs (Billboard)	28

=== Year-end charts ===
Chart (2008)	Position
US Adult Contemporary (Billboard)	25
