= After the Thrill Is Gone =

1975 song by The Eagles

Single by Eagles

from the album One of These Nights
- A-side: "Take It to the Limit"
- Released: November 10, 1975
- Genre: Rock
- Length: 3:56
- Label: Asylum
- Songwriters: Don Henley; Glenn Frey
- Producer: Bill Szymczyk

"After the Thrill Is Gone" is a song written by Glenn Frey and Don Henley that was first released on the Eagles 1975 album One of These Nights.

== Background ==
According to Eagles' guitarist Don Felder, the song was initially Frey's idea. According to Henley, he and Frey were aware of B.B. King's song "The Thrill Is Gone", and wrote the song to explore the aftermath: "We know that the thrill is gone – so, now what?" Felder said "[Frey] loved B.B. King's 'The Thrill Is Gone' and while working to perfect a particular sound he wanted, he piped up 'Hey, how about calling it 'After the Thrill is Gone.'" The fact that Bill Szymczyk had produced King's version of "The Thrill Is Gone" was one of the things that attracted the Eagles to using Szymczyk as their producer. Frey wrote most of the verses while Henley wrote most of the bridges. According to Frey, the song was "a lot of self-examination, hopefully not too much."

== Lyrics and music ==
"After the Thrill Is Gone" is a slow ballad. The lyrics describe a situation that should result in a break up, but it is not explicit whether the situation refers to a band that should break up or a sexual relationship. Valley Advocate critic Jon Davis regarded the theme of the song to be "the emptiness of success and the fear of a creative drought" and felt it was the closest the Eagles came to making a "'dangerous' personal statement." American Songwriter critic Jim Beviglia similarly saw the theme as "behind the glamour and glitz on the surface, there’s a lot of suffering going on underneath it all." Los Angeles Times critic Robert Hilburn stated that the theme is that "it's often easier to remain in an unsatisfactory relationship than go through the possible emotional scars of breaking it off." According to Rolling Stone critic Stephen Holden, the song uses "sexual duplicity and malaise" as "metaphors for the [Los Angeles'] transient, hedonistic ambience". Similar to Davis, Holden also noted a theme of anxiety in the line "What can you do when your dreams come true, and it's not quite like you'd planned?" Uncut critic Paul Moody regarded it as an "acknowledgement that the intertwining of personal and professional lives has its drawbacks" and called the song "a bittersweet comment on fame."

On the studio recording (and live performances during Frey's lifetime), Frey sings lead on the verses and choruses, while Henley sings lead on the bridge.

== Reception ==
In 2016, the editors of Rolling Stone rated "After the Thrill Is Gone" to be the Eagles' 21st best song. Ultimate Classic Rock critic Nick DeRiso rated it to be the Eagles' 30th best song, praising "[Don] Felder's [guitar] solo, which adds a touch of simmering anger." Ultimate Classic Rock critic Sterling Whitaker rated it to be the Eagles 4th most underrated song. Whitaker praised Henley's and Frey's "close harmony singing" and said that "The lyric perfectly captures both the fading thrill of the '70s club scene, and the malaise that had begun to creep into the band." Something Else! critic Preston Frazier regarded it as one of the Eagles' 5 best songs, praising Felder's guitar, Bernie Leadon's pedal steel guitar as well as the vocal performances. Moody said that it showed "proof of Henley and Frey's growing confidence as songwriters". Bevigila rated it to the 4th best song on One of These Nights, particularly praising the "outstanding vocal performances." American Songwriter critic Alex Hopper regarded it as one of Frey's 3 best vocal performances, stating that "He wows as a balladeer in this melancholy track about the fickle friend time can be in a relationship." The editors of Classic Rock regarded the song as one of the Eagles' best.

"After the Thrill Is Gone" has been included on several of the Eagles' compilation albums, including Greatest Hits, Vol. 2 in 1982, Selected Works: 1972–1999 in 2000 and The Very Best Of in 2003.
