= The Disco Strangler =

1979 song by The Eagles

Song by Eagles

from the album The Long Run
- Released: September 24, 1979
- Genre: Rock
- Length: 2:46
- Label: Asylum
- Songwriters: Don Henley; Glenn Frey; Don Felder
- Producer: Bill Szymczyk

"The Disco Strangler" is a song written by Don Henley, Glenn Frey and Don Felder that was first released on the Eagles's 1979 album The Long Run

== Music and lyrics ==
"The Disco Strangler" mocks the disco obsession from the late 1970's. Co-writer Felder stated that the song "was designed as an antidote to the Bee Gees-discotheque that was going on at the time, after the success of the 1977 film Saturday Night Fever, with John Travolta. According to Allmusic critic Mike DeGagne, the song "pokes fun at the disco queens that strut their stuff in order to gain the attention of curious onlookers." In the song the woman is "dressed to kill" and dances in the spotlight to get people to look at how beautiful she is, while the disco strangler lurks in the shadows waiting for an opportunity to choke her. The strangler is described in the song as "the fiddler in your darkest night."

DeGagne describes the music as being different from the Eagles' usual country music-influenced, guitar based sound. Rather, he said that "the song imitates the furious pace and atmosphere of a dance club" and that "What makes this song so unique is its anxious, jittery guitar licks that are played to a drumbeat which is accentuated at half-speed." Music journalist John Van der Kiste stated that the rhythm guitar is "funky" and that it is accompanied by "an intermittent bass riff and drums to match." Henley's vocal sings lyrics with few pauses. Van der Kiste stated that "there is no variation in chords or pitch throughout."

== Reception ==
Classic Rock critic Paul Elliott described "The Disco Strangler" as a "creepy dance-rock track." The song has divided critics, with some considering it among the best Eagles' songs and some considering it one of the worst.

Something Else! critic Nick DeRiso rated "The Disco Strangler" to be among the Eagles 5 worst songs, DeRiso took issue with the "unmusical" riff of "The Disco Strangler" and the "judgmental" and "humorless" lyrics in which Henley "skewer[ed] people who would dare go out to have a good time and maybe meet someone — even as he screwed everything that moved. DeRiso took issue with the "unmusical" riff of "The Disco Strangler" and the "judgmental" and "humorless" lyrics in which Henley "skewer[ed] people who would dare go out to have a good time and maybe meet someone — even as he screwed everything that moved. Eagles FAQ author Andrew Vaughan called "The Disco Strangler" "a track best ignored and left to rest in peace." Uncut critic Jason Anderson called "The Disco Strangler" a misogynistic tale" and "a vicious little rocker that ridicules the hedonsim of the club scene (as opposed to [the Eagles'] preferred variety of hedonism.)" Eagles biographer Marc Eliot called it "a new low for the band", saying it "was a nasty attack on the disco craze, done without a lot of humor, charm, irony or musicality." AllMusic critic William Ruhlmann considered it to be a "second-rank [song]...that sounded like [it[ couldn't have taken three hours much less three years to come up with." Van der Kiste found it to be "filler of the worst kind", stating that it may have been intended as satire but that the meaning of the song seems to have been more "sinister" than that.

On the other hand, AllMusic critic Mike DeGagne called "The Disco Strangler" a "gem", saying that the song is unique because of "its anxious, jittery guitar licks that are played to a drumbeat which is accentuated at half-speed." DeGagne praised the satire of the song, and how it Henley uses his "dry wit" to mock the 1970's disco scene. Classic Rock History critic Brian Kachejan rated it as Don Felder's 6th best song, calling it "an often overlooked gem" which "embodies the band’s shift towards a darker, edgier sound" and praising how "Felder’s searing guitar lines cut through the song’s ominous bass line and minimalist beat, setting a tense, almost claustrophobic mood." And the editors of Rolling Stone rated it the Eagles' 28th best song, calling it a "shadowy, pulsating...track" and saying that the arrangement "was a subtle, ironic nod to thumpy disco beats and ended up being one of the Eagles' most mordant recorded moments."

Columnist Chuck Klosterman took a more nuanced view. Klosterman complained about the "cynicism" of the song being "a disco track about how disco is insidious." But he came to appreciate the song when he realized that "everything about its latent meaning and its larger merit is being imagined and manipulated by my brain's unwillingness to hold an unexplained opinion."
