= Victim of Love (Eagles song) =

1976 song by the Eagles

Single by Eagles

from the album Hotel California
- A-side: "New Kid in Town"
- Released: December 7, 1976
- Recorded: 1976
- Studio: Criteria, Miami; Record Plant, Los Angeles
- Genre: Rock
- Length: 4:11
- Label: Asylum
- Songwriters: Don Felder, Don Henley, Glenn Frey, JD Souther
- Producer: Bill Szymczyk

"Victim of Love" is a song written by Don Felder, Don Henley, Glenn Frey and JD Souther that first appeared on the Eagles' 1976 album Hotel California. It was also released as the b-side of the lead single from the album, "New Kid in Town". When the single was released, Henley and Frey believed that both sides would receive significant airplay.

== Writing and recording ==
"Victim of Love" has its origin in an instrumental Felder had written, which he had tentatively titled "Iron Lung" because it sounded like a respiratory patient wheezing and reminded Felder of a childhood illness. He included it on a cassette with several musical ideas he had for the upcoming album, which he shared with Henley and Frey. Frey and Henley particularly liked two of the ideas - this one and the music that led to "Hotel California" - and Felder, Frey, Henley and Souther began working on the lyrics at Frey's house. They discussed broken relationships and lost dreams, and Souther said that having a broken heart is like being a victim of a car crash. They felt that "victim" was a good word for the song, and when deciding what to be a victim of, either Henley or Frey suggested "victim of love", which became the song's title.

Felder was promised a lead vocal on the album, and he assumed it would be on this song. Felder took a stab at recording the lead vocal and recognized that his first attempt wasn't great. While Felder was at dinner, Henley took a stab at singing the lead vocal. Even Felder recognized that Henley's vocal was great and so it was retained, although Felder was disappointed at not getting a lead vocal on the Hotel California album.

The recording of "Victim of Love" was unusual for the Eagles in that they played all the instruments live together without any overdubs. Only the lead and harmony vocals were overdubbed." In order to commemorate the fact that song was recorded live, producer Bill Szymczyk had "V.O.L. is a five piece live" etched into the runout groove of initial pressings of the vinyl album.

== Lyrics and music ==
Classic Rock History critic Brian Kachejian described the theme of "Victim of Love" as "betrayal and disillusionment" as the song "delves into the emotional wreckage left behind when love turns sour, capturing the complexity of human relationships." The singer is speaking to an unnamed woman who is partying "in a room full of noise and dangerous boys". Although the woman seems to be concerned about her relationships with men, she appears to enjoy the chase. She claims she is over a particular other man, but the singer notices that she is still involved with him sexually. In the chorus, the singer calls out her hypocrisy of claiming to be a victim of love when she is actually aroused by her problems with men. Music professor James E. Perone interprets the chorus as the singer "[inviting] the woman to be a victim of his love." Eagles biographer Marc Eliot suggested that singer himself is trying to decide whether he is victim or a user, not only of women but also of drugs and other excesses of the rock 'n' roll life.

"Victim of Love" is a moderately hard rock song, described by Classic Rock critic Joe Daly as a "stomping, mid-tempo rocker." Eagles FAQ author Andrew Vaughan described it as "feisty song". Roanoke Times critic Fran Coombs said it was the Eagles' "hardest rocker" since "Witchy Woman" on their debut album of 1972. Green Bay Press-Gazette critic Warren Gerds called it a "simple beat song" in that it is driven by "an interlocking of drums and bass." It opens with a guitar riff played by Felder which, according to Ultimate Classic Rock critic Nick DeRiso "stutters and snarls." Felder's lead guitar playing throughout the song provides an biting contrast to Henley's cooler and more detached vocal. Joe Walsh plays slide guitar with an intensity that also contrasts with the vocal performance, and also supplies a "brief but searing" solo.

Perone pointed out that the song provides a strong contrast between the music in the chorus and the music in the verses, particularly in the electric guitar parts.

== Reception ==
The editors of Rolling Stone rated "Victim of Love" to be the Eagles' 30th best song. DeRiso and Kachejian both rated "Victim of Love" to be Felder's 3rd best song with the Eagles. DeRiso also rated it to be the Eagles' 24th best song overall. Daly rated Walsh's performance to be the 7th greatest slide guitar moment in rock, praising the "intensity that’s both cutting and captivating" and saying that the solo "brilliantly encapsulates a 'less is more' approach."

"Victim of Love" was included on the Eagles 1982 compilation album Eagles Greatest Hits Volume 2 and on the 2003 compilation album The Very Best Of. A live version was included on the 2000 compilation album Selected Works: 1972–1999.
