= How Long (JD Souther song) =

1972 promotional single by JD Souther

Promotional single by JD Souther

from the album John David Souther
- B-side: "The Fast One"
- Written: 1971
- Released: September 1972
- Genre: Country rock
- Length: 3:22
- Label: Asylum
- Songwriter: JD Souther
- Producers: JD Souther, Fred Catero

JD Souther singles chronology
"How Long" (1972)	"Black Rose" (1976)

Audio
- "How Long" on YouTube

"How Long"

Single by Eagles

from the album Long Road Out of Eden
- Released: August 20, 2007
- Genre: Country rock, rock and roll
- Length: 3:15
- Label: Lost Highway
- Songwriter: JD Souther
- Producers: Eagles, Steuart Smith, Richard F. W. Davis, Scott Crago, Bill Szymczyk

Eagles singles chronology
"No More Cloudy Days" (2006)	"How Long" (2007)	"Busy Being Fabulous" (2008)

Music video
- "How Long" on YouTube

"How Long" is a song by American singer-songwriter JD Souther. Written in 1971, it was originally recorded by Souther for his 1972 debut solo album, John David Souther. It was given a limited release as a promotional 7-inch 45 rpm single in 1972 with Souther's "The Fast One" on the B-side.

The Eagles, longtime friends and collaborators with Souther, frequently performed "How Long" in concert during the early and mid-1970s. In 2007, the band covered the song for their album Long Road Out of Eden, the group's first full studio album since 1979. A year later, their version of the song won the Grammy Award for Best Country Performance by a Duo or Group with Vocal. It was the band's first Grammy since 1979.

== Charts ==
=== Weekly charts ===
Chart (2007–2008)	Peak position
Canada Hot 100 (Billboard)	76
Romania (Romanian Top 100)	88
UK Singles (Official Charts Company)	110
US Bubbling Under Hot 100 (Billboard)	1
US Adult Alternative Airplay (Billboard)	9
US Adult Contemporary (Billboard)	7
US Hot Country Songs (Billboard)	23

=== Year-end charts ===
Chart (2007)	Position
US Adult Contemporary (Billboard)	32
Chart (2008)	Position
US Adult Contemporary (Billboard)	29
