= The Long Run (album) =

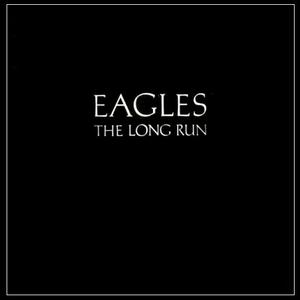

Studio album by the Eagles
- Released: September 24, 1979
- Recorded: March 1978 – September 1979
- Studios: Criteria, Miami; Bayshore, Coconut Grove, Florida; One Step Up, Los Angeles; Love 'n' Comfort, Los Angeles; Britannia, Los Angeles; Record Plant, Los Angeles
- Genre: Rock
- Length: 42:50
- Label: Asylum
- Producer: Bill Szymczyk

The Eagles chronology
Hotel California (1976)	The Long Run (1979)	Eagles Live (1980)

Singles from The Long Run
- 1. "Heartache Tonight" Released: September 18, 1979; 2. "The Long Run" Released: November 27, 1979; 3. "I Can't Tell You Why" Released: February 4, 1980

The Long Run is the sixth studio album by American rock band the Eagles. It was released in 1979 by Asylum Records in the United States and the United Kingdom. This was the first Eagles album to feature bassist Timothy B. Schmit, who had replaced founding member Randy Meisner.

This was the band's final studio album for Asylum Records. It also turned out to be their last studio album during their original tenure, as the Eagles disbanded in 1980. The Eagles did not release another studio album until 2007's Long Road Out of Eden.

Three singles were released from the album, "Heartache Tonight", "The Long Run", and "I Can't Tell You Why". "Heartache Tonight" reached No. 1 on the singles chart and won a Grammy Award. The album was certified 7× Platinum by the RIAA and has sold more than eight million copies in the US.

== Background ==
The album was originally intended to be a double album. However, because the band could not come up with enough songs, the idea was scrapped. The recording was protracted; they started recording in 1978, and the album took 18 months to record in five different studios before it was finally released in September 1979. According to Don Henley, the band members were "completely burned out" and "physically, emotionally, spiritually and creatively exhausted" from a long tour when they started recording the album, and they had few songs. However, they managed to put together ten songs for the album, with contribution from their friends JD Souther and Bob Seger who co-wrote with Frey and Henley on "Heartache Tonight". (Souther also got songwriting credit on "Teenage Jail" and "The Sad Cafe".)

According to Henley, the title track was in part a response to press articles that said they were "passé" as disco was then dominant and punk emerging, which inspired lines such as "Who is gonna make it/ We'll find out in the long run". He said that the inspiration for the lyrics was also "irony", as they wrote about longevity and posterity while the group "was breaking apart, imploding under the pressure of trying to deliver a worthy follow-up to Hotel California".

Randy Meisner decided to leave the Eagles after an argument in Knoxville, Tennessee, during the Hotel California Tour in June 1977. He was replaced by Timothy B. Schmit, who brought an unfinished song to the band, "I Can't Tell You Why". Schmit wrote the song based loosely on his own experiences; both Henley and Frey liked the song and they completed the song together. Joe Walsh also contributed the song "In the City", which was first recorded by Walsh for the movie soundtrack for The Warriors, where it was credited only to Walsh, not the Eagles. Don Felder wrote the tune for "The Disco Strangler" using a four-on-the-floor disco beat as the basis for the composition. Henley wrote the lyrics. Henley intended the song to be an antidote to disco as both he and the rest of the band disliked disco, which was the most popular musical genre at the time. The song "The Sad Cafe" was inspired by the Troubadour nightclub in Hollywood where the Eagles once played, and also by Dan Tana's restaurant that they frequented, while "The Greeks Don't Want No Freaks" was written as an homage to Sixties "frat rock" such as the song "96 Tears" by ? and the Mysterians.

The album was produced by Bill Szymczyk, although the Eagles were listed as co-producers.

== Album pressing ==
The original vinyl record pressings of The Long Run (Elektra/Asylum catalog no. 5E-508) had text engraved in the run-out groove of each side, continuing an in-joke trend the band had started with their 1975 album One of These Nights:

1. Side one: "Never let your monster lay down"
2. Side two: "From the Polack who sailed north" (may be a reference to the producer of the album Bill Szymczyk)

== Critical reception ==
Professional ratings
Review scores
Source	Rating
AllMusic	3/5 stars
Christgau's Record Guide	C+
Classic Rock	3.5/5 stars
The Encyclopedia of Popular Music	2/5 stars
The Great Rock Discography	6/10
MusicHound Rock	4/5 stars
Music Week	4/4 stars
Record Mirror	4/5 stars
The Rolling Stone Album Guide	3/5 stars
Smash Hits	4/10

In 1979 Rolling Stone wrote, "Overall, The Long Run is a synthesis of previous macabre Eagles motifs, with cynical new insights that are underlined by slashing rock & roll...(it) is a bitter, wrathful, difficult record, full of piss and vinegar and poisoned expectations. Because it’s steeped in fresh, risky material and unflinching self-examination, it’s also the Eagles’ best work in many, many years." The Globe and Mail determined that "the Eagles' fawning synthesis of various kinds of rock and that roll sits less well the smoother it gets." The New York Times stated that The Long Run "is neatly balanced among standard Eagles rockers, rather shallow social commentary, ballads and novelty numbers," and noted that the band's "mean streak" has "never been so apparent."

Reviewing the album retrospectively in AllMusic, critic William Ruhlmann wrote that the album was a "major disappointment, even though it sold several million copies and threw off three hit singles," adding that the album "reportedly was planned as a double album before being truncated to a single disc. If these were the keepers, what could the rejects have sounded like?"

Several songs on The Long Run have received particular derision from critics. Ruhlmann considered "The Disco Strangler", "King of Hollywood" and "Teenage Jail" to be "second-rank songs...that sounded like they couldn't have taken three hours much less three years to come up with." Something Else! critic Nick DeRiso similarly rated "The Disco Strangler" and "Teenage Jail" to be among the Eagles' five worst songs; DeRiso described "Teenage Jail" as a "ploddingly flaccid throwaway" that was "irritating musically, unfocused lyrically, and featuring a squiggly synthesizer solo (!) from Glenn Frey." Uncut critic Jason Anderson said that it "seems to depict a comeuppance for yet another young woman, but the song's dirge-like nature discourages efforts to unpack the lyrics."

Anderson felt that "King of Hollywood" matched the meanness of "The Disco Strangler", calling it "a musically plodding and lyrically scabrous portrait of a sexually predatory Hollywood producer that feels like Henley's attempt to settle scores with movie bigwigs after movie versions of Desperado and Hotel California failed to get off the ground."

Rolling Stone rated "The Greeks Don't Want No Freaks" to be the Eagles' 37th best song, calling it an "atypically loose two-and-a-half minute homage to Sixties garage rock." Anderson called it "an enthusiastic homage to '60s frat rock."

=== Grammys ===
Year	Nominee / work	Award	Result
1980	"Heartache Tonight"	Best Rock Performance by a Duo or Group with Vocal	Won

== Commercial performance ==
When released in September 1979, The Long Run debuted at number two on Billboard's Pop Albums chart and a week later hit number one. It stood for nine weeks in the number one slot. The Long Run was first certified platinum by the Recording Industry Association of America (RIAA) on February 1, 1980, and reached 7× Platinum status on March 20, 2001. It has sold more than eight million copies in the US.

The album generated three Top 10 singles, "Heartache Tonight", the album's title cut, and "I Can't Tell You Why". Those singles reached No. 1, No. 8 and No. 8 respectively. The band also won a Grammy Award for "Heartache Tonight".

The album reached number 1 in Japan in 1979.

== Track listing ==
Side one
No.	Title	Writer(s)	Lead vocals	Length
1.	"The Long Run"	Don Henley; Glenn Frey	Henley	3:42
2.	"I Can't Tell You Why"	Henley; Frey; Timothy B. Schmit	Schmit	4:56
3.	"In the City"	Joe Walsh; Barry De Vorzon	Walsh	3:46
4.	"The Disco Strangler"	Henley; Frey; Don Felder	Henley	2:46
5.	"King of Hollywood"	Henley; Frey	Frey and Henley	6:27

Side two
No.	Title	Writer(s)	Lead vocals	Length
1.	"Heartache Tonight"	Henley; Frey; Bob Seger; JD Souther	Frey	4:27
2.	"Those Shoes"	Henley; Frey; Felder	Henley	4:57
3.	"Teenage Jail"	Henley; Frey; Souther	Frey and Henley	3:44
4.	"The Greeks Don't Want No Freaks"	Henley; Frey	Henley	2:21
5.	"The Sad Café"	Henley; Frey; Walsh; Souther	Henley	5:35

== Personnel ==
Credits adapted from the liner notes.

Eagles

- Don Felder – backing vocals, guitars, organ on "The Long Run", talkbox on "Those Shoes"
- Glenn Frey – vocals, acoustic and electric rhythm guitars, keyboards, lead guitar on "I Can't Tell You Why" and "King of Hollywood"
- Don Henley – vocals, drums, percussion
- Timothy B. Schmit – vocals, bass guitar
- Joe Walsh – vocals, guitars, keyboards, talkbox on "Those Shoes"

Additional personnel

- Jimmy Buffett – backing vocals on "The Greeks Don't Want No Freaks"
- The Monstertones – backing vocals on "The Greeks Don't Want No Freaks"
- David Sanborn – alto saxophone on "The Sad Café"
- Bob Seger – backing vocals on "Heartache Tonight" (not credited in liner notes)
- Joe Vitale – piano, electric piano

Production

- Bill Szymczyk – producer and engineer
- Ed Mashal – engineer
- David Crowther – assistant engineer
- Mark Curry – assistant engineer
- Phil Jamtaas – assistant engineer
- Bob Stringer – assistant engineer
- Bob Winder – assistant engineer
- Ted Jensen – mixing, remastering
- John Kosh – art direction, design
- Jim Shea – photography

== Leftover tracks ==
Several more songs were submitted for The Long Run, but did not make it. Some of these are included in the collection Selected Works: 1972–1999, with the title "Long Run Leftovers", though in a barely recognizable form. Joe Walsh later resurrected two of them, which surfaced on his solo albums: "Rivers (of the Hidden Funk)" on There Goes the Neighborhood (1981) and "I Told You So" on You Bought It, You Name It (1983). The music of both of them appear to have been written by Don Felder, with lyrics by Walsh. Felder is also credited for playing guitar on both songs.

== Charts ==
=== Weekly charts ===
Chart (1979–1980)	Peak position
Australian Albums (Kent Music Report)	1
Canada Top Albums/CDs (RPM)	1
Dutch Albums (Album Top 100)	3
Finnish Albums (The Official Finnish Charts)	9
French Albums (SNEP)	2
German Albums (Offizielle Top 100)	20
Italian Albums (Musica e Dischi)	13
Japanese Albums (Oricon)	1
New Zealand Albums (RMNZ)	2
Norwegian Albums (VG-lista)	5
Swedish Albums (Sverigetopplistan)	1
UK Albums (Official Charts)	4
US Billboard 200	1

=== Year-end charts ===
Chart (1979)	Position
Australian Albums (Kent Music Report)	25
Canada Top Albums/CDs (RPM)	32
French Albums (SNEP)	65
Japanese Albums (Oricon)	41
New Zealand Albums (RMNZ)	26

Chart (1980)	Position
Australian Albums (Kent Music Report)	30
Canada Top Albums/CDs (RPM)	6
New Zealand Albums (RMNZ)	13
US Billboard 200	2

== Certifications ==
Region	Certification	Certified units/sales
Australia (ARIA)	3× Platinum	210,000^{^}
France (SNEP)	2× Gold	200,000^{*}
Hong Kong (IFPI Hong Kong)	Gold	10,000^{*}
Japan (Oricon Charts)	—	247,000
New Zealand (RMNZ)	Platinum	15,000^{^}
Switzerland (IFPI Switzerland)	Gold	25,000^{^}
United Kingdom (BPI)	Gold	100,000^{^}
United States (RIAA)	7× Platinum	8,000,000
^{*} Sales figures based on certification alone.^{^} Shipments figures based on certification alone.

== See also ==
- 1979 in music
