= One of These Nights =

Studio album by the Eagles
- Released: June 10, 1975
- Recorded: 1974–1975
- Studios: Criteria (Miami, Florida); Record Plant (Los Angeles, California)
- Genres: Rock; soft rock; country rock; folk rock
- Length: 43:15
- Label: Asylum
- Producer: Bill Szymczyk

The Eagles chronology
On the Border (1974)	One of These Nights (1975)	Their Greatest Hits (1971–1975) (1976)

Singles from One of These Nights
- 1. "One of These Nights" Released: May 19, 1975; 2. "Lyin' Eyes" Released: August 9, 1975; 3. "Take It to the Limit" Released: November 24, 1975

One of These Nights is the fourth studio album by the American rock band the Eagles, released on June 10, 1975, by Asylum Records. The album was the band's commercial breakthrough, transforming them into international superstars. In July that year, the record became the Eagles' first number one album on the Billboard Top LPs & Tape chart, yielding three Top 10 singles: "One of These Nights", "Lyin' Eyes" and "Take It to the Limit". Its title song is the group's second number one single on the Billboard Hot 100. The album sold four million copies and received a Grammy nomination for Album of the Year. A single from the album, "Lyin' Eyes," was also nominated for Record of the Year, and won the Eagles their first Grammy for Best Pop Performance by a Duo or Group with Vocals at the 18th Annual Grammy Awards in 1976. The band embarked on the worldwide One of These Nights tour to promote the album.

One of These Nights is the last Eagles album to feature the original lineup of Randy Meisner, Glenn Frey, Don Henley, and Bernie Leadon (along with then-new member Don Felder). Leadon left the band after the album's tour due to his dissatisfaction with the band's shift from country towards a more mainstream rock sound and was replaced by Joe Walsh. The seventh track, "Visions", is the only Eagles song on which lead guitarist Don Felder sang the lead vocals, despite his desire to write and sing more songs.

== Background ==
The Eagles began working on their fourth album in late 1974. Glenn Frey and Don Henley wrote four of the nine songs by themselves, and they also collaborated with other members of the band on three other songs. Many of the songs were written while Frey and Henley were sharing a house in Beverly Hills, including "One of These Nights", "Lyin' Eyes", "Take It to the Limit" and "After the Thrill Is Gone". In an interview with Cameron Crowe, Henley joked that it was their "satanic country-rock period" because "it was a dark time, both politically and musically" in America, referring to the turmoil in Washington and disco music starting to take off. He added: "We thought, 'Well, how can we write something with that flavor, with that kind of beat, and still have the dangerous guitars?' We wanted to capture the spirit of the times."

Frey said that "One of These Nights was the most fluid and 'painless' album [they] ever made", and thought that the quality of the songs he wrote with Henley had improved dramatically. However, Leadon was becoming increasingly unhappy during the making of the album. He wrote three of the nine songs, none of which was released as a single. He was unhappy with the more rock direction of the band that Frey preferred, at one time walking out of a meeting to go surfing, rather than discuss which take to use after the recording of a rock track. Leadon would leave the band in late 1975, after the album was released.

Frey also began to sing less as a lead singer starting with this album, singing solo lead on only one song ("Lyin' Eyes") and sharing lead vocals with Henley on another ("After the Thrill Is Gone"). Henley later said: "[Glenn] was generous in that respect ... If I began to do more than he did, it was because if someone had a strong suit he would play that card. 'You sing this, you sing it better,' that kind of thing." Randy Meisner sings lead on two songs, one of which, "Take it to the Limit", a composition he co-wrote with Frey and Henley, was released as the third single from the album. Of the nine Eagles songs to feature Randy Meisner singing solo, this is the only song of his to be released as a single.

== Track information ==
"One of These Nights", "Lyin' Eyes", and "Take It to the Limit" were released as singles.

=== "Journey of the Sorcerer" ===
"Journey of the Sorcerer" was used as the theme music for Douglas Adams' The Hitchhiker's Guide to the Galaxy radio series produced by the BBC in 1978 and 1979. Adams said he had wanted something that sounded "sci-fi" while at the same time suggestive of a traveller, so this banjo-based instrumental struck him as ideal. "Journey of the Sorcerer" was used subsequently for the television series in 1981 (albeit re-recorded), the sequel radio series produced by Above the Title Productions for the BBC in 2003 and 2004, and (re-recorded once again) for the film produced by Disney/Touchstone in 2005. The original version from One of These Nights was used for all original transmissions of all five radio series, and a further version was used for the sixth. The TV adaptation of the series, and also an additional version released on LP record, used an arrangement by Tim Souster. The CD releases of radio series transmitted in 2004 and 2005 used another version arranged by Philip Pope, and recorded by a tribute band The Illegal Eagles, and the 2005 film used a version by Joby Talbot.

=== "I Wish You Peace" ===
“I Wish You Peace” was written by Bernie Leadon and his then-girlfriend Patti Davis, daughter of Republican then-Governor of California Ronald Reagan. Nancy Reagan had already disowned Patti during this period, ostensibly because of her choice to live together with Leadon as an unmarried couple. Years later Don Henley would disparage this song as an Eagles release, describing it as "smarmy cocktail music" and "certainly not something the Eagles are proud of". Henley was also annoyed that Davis was given cowriting credit, and told a reporter: "Nobody else wanted [the song]. We didn't feel it was up to the band's standards, but we put it on anyway as a gesture to keep the band together."

=== "After the Thrill Is Gone" ===
"After the Thrill Is Gone" is a ballad written by Frey and Henley. According to Henley, he and Frey were aware of B.B. King's song "The Thrill Is Gone", and wrote the song to explore the aftermath: "We know that the thrill is gone – so, now what?" On the studio recording (and live performances during Frey's lifetime), Frey sings lead on the verses and choruses, while Henley sings lead on the bridge.

== Artwork ==
The cover for the album is an image of an artwork by Boyd Elder, also known as "El Chingadero". Elder knew the Eagles in 1972 when pieces of his work were exhibited in an art gallery in Venice, California; among those who attended the opening were members of the Eagles who performed "Witchy Woman" at the show, an early appearance by the band as the Eagles. In 1973, Elder started to create artwork of painted skulls with wings and feathers. Elder was a friend of the album cover designer Gary Burden, who was responsible for the Eagles' three previous albums and was interested in using one of Elder's pieces for this cover. Elder presented two of his works to the Eagles in Dallas in late 1974, one of which was then chosen for the cover of One of These Nights. Later another work of Elder, an image of an eagle's skull, would be used for the cover of Their Greatest Hits album. The painted animal skull motif was also used in the cover for their compilation album The Very Best of, and the skull of One of These Nights was used for the cover of the documentary History of the Eagles.

The album cover for One of These Nights is the last Eagles album design on which Burden was involved. He made the skull stand up off the page by debossing large areas together with detailed and elaborate embossing in the wings and feathers. According to Burden, the cover image represents where the band was coming from and where they were going – "The cow skull is pure cowboy, folk, the decorations are American Indian inspired and the future is represented by the more polished reflective glass beaded surfaces covering the skull. All set against the dark eagle feather wings that speak of mysterious powers." The album artwork received a Grammy nomination for Best Album Package.

== Album pressing ==
Original vinyl record pressings of One of These Nights (Elektra/Asylum catalog no. 7E-1039) had the following text engraved in the run-out grooves of each album side:

1. Side one: "Don't worry --"
2. Side two: "-- Nothing will be O.K.!"

The Eagles and their producer Bill Szymczyk would continue the trend of including such "hidden messages" in the run-out grooves on several subsequent albums.

This is the second album by the Eagles to have a Quadraphonic surround sound pressing. It was released on Quadraphonic 8-track tape and CD-4 LP.

== Critical reception ==
Professional ratings
Review scores
Source	Rating
AllMusic	4/5 stars
Christgau's Record Guide	C+
(The New) Rolling Stone Album Guide	3.5/5 stars

Stephen Holden of Rolling Stone, in an early review of the album, expressed a liking for the album but did not consider it a great album. He thought the band's ensemble playing "unprecedentedly excellent" but they "lack an outstanding singer", and that while "many of their tunes are pretty, none are eloquent." He added: "And for all their worldly perceptiveness, the Eagles' lyrics never transcend Hollywood slickness. Their hard rock has always seemed a bit forced, constructed more from commercial considerations than from any urgent impulse to boogie. And when the Eagles attempt to communicate wild sexuality, they sound only boyishly enthused. These limitations, however, seem built into the latter-day concept of Southern California rock, of which the Eagles remain the unrivaled exponents." Holden called "Journey of the Sorcerer" "a bombastic instrumental [that] should have been omitted", and "I Wish You Peace" "a trite afterthought, poorly sung", while praising “After the Thrill Is Gone" as the album's "best ballad".

(The New) Rolling Stone Album Guide judged the album to be the band's "most musically adventurous outing yet, flirting with disco on the title song, a waltz on "Take It to the Limit", and bluegrass psychedelia on Leadon's "Journey of the Sorcerer".

In a retrospective review, William Ruhlmann of AllMusic was more favorable. He thought that it had more original material and that the material was more polished, writing: "One of These Nights was the culmination of the blend of rock, country, and folk styles the Eagles had been making since their start; there wasn't much that was new, just the same sorts of things done better than they had been before. In particular, a lyrical stance—knowing and disillusioned, but desperately hopeful—had evolved, and the musical arrangements were tighter and more purposeful. The result was the Eagles' best-realized and most popular album so far."

Ultimate Classic Rock critic Sterling Whitaker rated both "One of These Nights" and "After the Thrill Has Gone" as being among the Eagles' 10 most underrated songs.

=== Accolades ===
==== Grammy ====
Year	Nominee / work	Award	Result	Ref.
1976	"Lyin' Eyes"	Record of the Year	Nominated	
1976	"Lyin' Eyes"	Best Pop Performance by a Duo or Group with Vocal	Won	
1976	"One of These Nights" (Gary Burden)	Best Album Package	Nominated	
1976	"One of These Nights"	Album of the Year	Nominated	

== Commercial performance ==
The album debuted on the US Billboard 200 chart at number 25 the week of its release, and climbed to number one in its fourth week on the chart, where it then stayed the next four weeks. It was the first of four consecutive number one albums for the Eagles. The album was certified quadruple platinum by the Recording Industry Association of America (RIAA), signifying shipment of over four million copies in the United States.

== Track listing ==
Side one
No.	Title	Writer(s)	Lead vocals	Length
1.	"One of These Nights"	Don Henley; Glenn Frey	Henley	4:51
2.	"Too Many Hands"	Randy Meisner; Don Felder	Meisner	4:43
3.	"Hollywood Waltz"	Henley; Frey; Bernie Leadon; Tom Leadon	Henley	4:04
4.	"Journey of the Sorcerer"	B. Leadon	instrumental	6:40

Side two
No.	Title	Writer(s)	Lead vocals	Length
1.	"Lyin' Eyes"	Henley; Frey	Frey	6:22
2.	"Take It to the Limit"	Meisner; Henley; Frey	Meisner	4:48
3.	"Visions"	Henley; Felder	Felder with Henley, B. Leadon, and Frey	3:58
4.	"After the Thrill Is Gone"	Henley; Frey	Frey and Henley	3:56
5.	"I Wish You Peace"	B. Leadon; Patti Davis	B. Leadon	3:45

== Personnel ==
Credits adapted from the liner notes.

Eagles

- Glenn Frey – vocals, acoustic and electric rhythm guitars, keyboards, harmonium on “Hollywood Waltz”, lead guitar on “Too Many Hands”
- Don Henley – vocals, drums, percussion, tablas on “Too Many Hands”
- Bernie Leadon – vocals, guitars, banjo, mandolin, pedal steel guitar
- Randy Meisner – vocals, bass guitar
- Don Felder – vocals, guitars, slide guitar

Additional personnel

- David Bromberg – fiddles ("Journey of the Sorcerer")
- The Royal Martian Orchestra – strings ("Journey of the Sorcerer")
- Albhy Galuten – synthesizer ("Hollywood Waltz")
- Jim Ed Norman – piano ("Lyin' Eyes", "One of These Nights," "Take It to the Limit"), orchestrations, conductor, string arrangements
- Sid Sharp – concert master
- The Eagles – string arrangements

Production

- Bill Szymczyk – producer, engineer
- Allan Blazek – engineer
- Michael Braunstein – engineer
- Ed Mashal – engineer
- Michael Verdick – engineer
- Don Wood – engineer
- Gary Burden – art direction, design
- Norman Seeff – photography
- Tom Kelley – cover photography
- Ted Jensen – remastering

== Charts ==
=== Weekly charts ===
Chart (1975–1976)	Peak position
Australian Albums (Kent Music Report)	5
Canada Top Albums/CDs (RPM)	2
Dutch Albums (Album Top 100)	2
Finnish Albums (The Official Finnish Charts)	23
German Albums (Offizielle Top 100)	49
Japanese Albums (Oricon)	28
New Zealand Albums (RMNZ)	2
Norwegian Albums (VG-lista)	9
UK Albums (Official Charts)	8
US Billboard 200	1
Chart (2016)	Peak position
Canadian Albums (Billboard)	99
Chart (2026)	Peak position
Belgian Albums (Ultratop Flanders)	48
French Physical Albums (SNEP) Deluxe edition	84
German Rock & Metal Albums (Offizielle Top 100)	9
Hungarian Physical Albums (MAHASZ)	6
Scottish Albums (Official Charts)	24
Swiss Albums (Schweizer Hitparade)	52
UK Album Downloads (Official Charts)	53
US Top Rock & Alternative Albums (Billboard)	27

=== Year-end charts ===
Chart (1975)	Position
Canada Top Albums/CDs (RPM)	12
UK Albums (OCC)	32
US Billboard 200	25
Chart (1976)	Position
Canada Top Albums/CDs (RPM)	73
US Billboard 200	29

== Certifications ==
Region	Certification	Certified units/sales
Australia (ARIA)	2× Platinum	140,000^{^}
Canada (Music Canada)	Platinum	100,000^{^}
United Kingdom (BPI)	Platinum	300,000^{^}
United States (RIAA)	4× Platinum	4,000,000^{^}
^{^} Shipments figures based on certification alone.
