= Please Come Home for Christmas =

1960 single by Charles Brown

Single by Charles Brown

from the album Charles Brown Sings Christmas Songs
- B-side: "Christmas (Comes but Once a Year)" by Amos Milburn
- Released: October 1960
- Recorded: September 21, 1960
- Genre: R&B; Christmas
- Length: 2:50
- Label: King 45-5405
- Songwriters: Charles Brown; Gene Redd

Charles Brown singles chronology
"Please Come Home for Christmas" (1960)	"Angel Baby (Charles Brown & Group)" (1961)

"Please Come Home for Christmas" is a Christmas song written in 1960 and released the same year by the American blues singer and pianist Charles Brown. The song was included on Charles Brown Sings Christmas Songs album, which was released in 1961 through King Records. Entering the US Billboard Hot 100 chart in December 1961, the tune, which Brown co-wrote with Gene Redd (Note: Brown claimed to have written the song alone.), peaked at position number 76. The single also appeared on Billboard magazine's Christmas Singles chart for nine holiday seasons, reaching number 1 in 1972. (Note: Of the many versions Brown recorded and released over the years through various labels, his original 1960 recording was his most popular.) The song has been covered by many artists, most successfully by the Eagles and Jon Bon Jovi.

== Background and composition ==
In early 1959 blues singer Charles Brown moved to Cincinnati, Ohio, after his recording career began to decline due to gambling debts he had incurred, where he worked as a personal pianist for illegal gambling kingpin Frank "Screw" Andrews. In 1960, Syd Nathan of Cincinnati's record label King Records offered Brown a recording contract, asking him for a Christmas song similar to his commercial success song "Merry Christmas Baby", written and composed by Lou Baxter and Johnny Moore in 1941.

Brown co-wrote the song with Gene Redd and recorded it at the in 1960 at Evanston's King Records Studio. The song was included on Brown's first christmas album Charles Brown Sings Christmas Songs album, which was released in 1961 through King Records. "Please Come Home for Christmas" includes a number of characteristics of Christmas music, such as multiple references in the lyrics to the Christmas season and Christmas traditions, and the use of a church bell type sound, created using tubular bells, at the start of the song.

== Eagles version ==
"Please Come Home for Christmas"

Single by Eagles
- B-side: "Funky New Year"
- Released: November 27, 1978
- Recorded: 1978
- Studio: Bayshore Recording Studios, Coconut Grove, Florida
- Genre: Rock; rhythm and blues; Christmas music
- Length: 2:57
- Label: Asylum 45555
- Songwriters: Charles Brown; Gene Redd
- Producer: Bill Szymczyk

Eagles singles chronology
"Life in the Fast Lane" (1977)	"Please Come Home for Christmas" (1978)	"Heartache Tonight" (1979)

In 1978, the rock band Eagles covered and released "Please Come Home for Christmas" as a holiday single. Their version of the song peaked at number 18 on the US Billboard Hot 100, the first Christmas song to reach the Top 20 on that chart since Roy Orbison's "Pretty Paper" in 1963. This was the first Eagles song to feature Timothy B. Schmit on bass (having replaced founding member Randy Meisner the previous year). The lineup features Don Henley (drums/lead vocals), Glenn Frey (piano, backing vocals), Joe Walsh (guitar, backing vocals), Schmit (bass/backing vocals), and Don Felder (lead guitar). Originally released as a vinyl 7-inch single, it was re-released as a CD single in 1995, reaching number 15 on the Billboard Adult Contemporary chart. This version includes the lyrics "bells will be ringing the sad, sad news" (that is, a Christmas alone) as opposed to Brown's original version which references the "glad, glad news" (that is, Christmas in general).

A live version of the song by Eagles was included on their four-disc box set compilation titled Selected Works: 1972–1999, which was released in 2000. This particular version was recorded in concert on December 31, 1999, in Los Angeles.

Forty-two years after it first charted, Eagles' 1978 recording of "Please Come Home for Christmas" re-entered the Billboard Hot 100 chart at No. 45 (on the chart dated January 2, 2021).

== Jon Bon Jovi/Bon Jovi version ==
"Please Come Home for Christmas"

Single by Bon Jovi

from the album A Very Special Christmas 2
- B-side: "I Wish Everyday Could Be Like Christmas"; "Back Door Santa"
- Released: December 5, 1994
- Genre: Christmas
- Length: 2:53
- Label: Mercury
- Songwriters: Charles Brown; Gene Redd
- Producer: Jimmy Iovine

Bon Jovi singles chronology
"Always" (1994)	"Please Come Home for Christmas" (1994)	"Someday I'll Be Saturday Night" (1995)

Jon Bon Jovi also covered "Please Come Home for Christmas" on the 1992 holiday album A Very Special Christmas 2 in the style of Eagles. In 1994 the same recording was released as a charity single in Europe, but this time instead of being credited as a solo recording by Jon Bon Jovi it was released under the band name Bon Jovi. A promo music video that featured supermodel Cindy Crawford was made to accompany that release. The 1994 single release reached the top 10 in the United Kingdom, Ireland, and Italy. Don Felder of Eagles also featured on guitar in this version of the song.

=== Critical reception ===
Stuart Bailie from NME wrote, "Sleighbells, big choirs, some hammond organ. Cindy Crawford snogs Jon on the cover for charidee [sic] (well, she'd have to, wouldn't she?). Alright, but not as nice as The Eagles' versh of the song." Mark Frith from Smash Hits gave it a full score of five out of five and named it Best New Single, saying, "Bit of a Christmas standard this [...]. But it's not been sung as perfectly as this. It's a short, sweet song. The right sentiments for Christmas so boyfriends will buy it for girlfriends and vice versa. Perfect."

== Charts ==
=== Charles Brown ===
Chart (1962)	Peak position
US Billboard Hot 100	76

=== Eagles ===
Chart (1978–1979)	Peak position
Belgium (Ultratop 50 Flanders)	19
Netherlands (Single Top 100)	5
New Zealand (Recorded Music NZ)	28
Sweden (Sverigetopplistan)	15
UK Singles (Official Charts)	30
US Billboard Hot 100	18

Chart (1995)	Peak position
US Billboard Hot Adult Contemporary Tracks	15

Chart (2005)	Peak position
US Billboard Hot Digital Songs	74

Chart (2018)	Peak position
Australia (ARIA)	94

Chart (2019)	Peak position
US Rolling Stone Top 100	35

Chart (2020)	Peak position
Canada Hot 100 (Billboard)	48

Chart (2021–2026)	Peak position
Australia (ARIA)	34
Austria (Ö3 Austria Top 40)	33
Canada Hot 100 (Billboard)	23
Estonia Airplay (TopHit)	185
Germany (GfK)	28
Global 200 (Billboard)	32
Greece International (IFPI) 2013 remaster	27
Ireland (IRMA)	43
Lithuania (AGATA)	40
Norway (IFPI Norge)	65
Portugal (AFP)	97
Romania Airplay (TopHit)	97
Switzerland (Schweizer Hitparade)	33

=== Bon Jovi ===
Chart (1994)	Peak position
Europe (Eurochart Hot 100)	28
Finland (Suomen virallinen lista)	20
Ireland (IRMA)	6
Italy (Musica e dischi)	10
Scottish Singles Sales (Official Charts)	8
UK Singles (Official Charts)	7
UK Airplay (Music Week)	10

Chart (2020–2023)	Peak position
Poland (Polish Airplay Top 100)	78
Slovenia (SloTop50)	30

=== Gary Allan ===
Chart (1997)	Peak position
US Hot Country Songs (Billboard)	70

=== Lee Roy Parnell ===
Chart (1997)	Peak position
US Hot Country Songs (Billboard)	71

=== Willie Nelson ===
Chart (2004)	Peak position
US Hot Country Songs (Billboard)	50

=== Josh Gracin ===
Chart (2006)	Peak position
US Hot Country Songs (Billboard)	51

=== Martina McBride ===
Chart (2011–2012)	Peak position
US Hot Country Songs (Billboard)	51

=== Kelly Clarkson ===
Chart (2013–2014)	Peak position
Canada AC (Billboard)	14
South Korea International Singles (GAON)	97
US Adult Contemporary (Billboard)	6
US Holiday Digital Songs (Billboard)	14

=== George Ezra ===
Chart (2021–2022)	Peak position
Croatia (HRT)	20
Germany (GfK)	100
Poland Airplay (ZPAV)	52
UK Singles (Official Charts)	8

== Certifications and sales ==
=== Eagles ===
Region	Certification	Certified units/sales
Germany (BVMI)	Gold	300,000^{‡}
New Zealand (RMNZ)	Platinum	30,000^{‡}
United Kingdom (BPI)	Gold	400,000^{‡}
United States (RIAA)	4× Platinum	4,000,000^{‡}
^{‡} Sales+streaming figures based on certification alone.

=== Jon Bon Jovi ===
Region	Certification	Certified units/sales
United Kingdom (BPI)	Silver	200,000^{‡}
^{‡} Sales+streaming figures based on certification alone.
