= Lyin' Eyes =

1975 song by the Eagles

Single by Eagles

from the album One of These Nights
- B-side: "Too Many Hands"
- Released: September 7, 1975
- Recorded: January 1975, Hollywood, California
- Genre: Country rock; soft rock; folk rock; Southern rock
- Length: 3:58 (single version); 6:22 (album version)
- Label: Asylum
- Songwriters: Don Henley; Glenn Frey
- Producer: Bill Szymczyk

Eagles singles chronology
"One of These Nights" (1975)	"Lyin' Eyes" (1975)	"Take It to the Limit" (1975)

"Lyin' Eyes" is a song written by Don Henley and Glenn Frey and recorded in 1975 by the American rock band Eagles, with Frey singing lead vocals. It was the second single from their album One of These Nights, reaching No. 2 on the Billboard Hot 100 chart and No. 8 on the Billboard Country chart. It remained their only top 40 country hit until "How Long" in 2007–2008.

The Eagles received a Grammy Award for Best Pop Vocal Performance by a Duo, Group or Chorus for "Lyin' Eyes", and were nominated for Record of the Year.

== Background and writing ==
The title and idea for the song came when Glenn Frey and Don Henley were in their favorite Los Angeles restaurant/bar Dan Tana's, which was frequented by many beautiful women, and they started talking about beautiful women who were cheating on their husbands. They saw a beautiful young woman with a fat and much older wealthy man, and Frey said: "She can't even hide those lyin' eyes." According to Henley, Frey was the main writer of the song, although he had some input with the verses and the music. The song was written when Frey and Henley were sharing a house in Trousdale, Beverly Hills. Frey said of the writing of the song that "the story had always been there. I don't want to say it wrote itself, but once we started working on it, there were no sticking points. Lyrics just kept coming out, and that's not always the way songs get written."

"Lyin' Eyes" is the only song on the One of These Nights album that Frey sang solo lead on (he shared lead vocals with Henley on "After the Thrill Is Gone"). The song was released as the second single from the album and reached No. 2 on the Billboard Hot 100 chart, behind “Island Girl” by Elton John. "Lyin' Eyes" also crossed over to the Country chart where it reached No. 8, their first on that chart and a feat few rock bands could have achieved at that time.

== Recording ==
In their 2025 book, Buzz Me In: Inside the Record Plant Studios, Martin Porter and David Goggin report "The final vocals on 'Lyin’ Eyes' were also made on [the] MCI console. According to Bill Szymczyk, the song’s opening line, 'City girls just seem to find out early,' was compiled ('comped') from six different takes from four different days. In fact, the two syllables 'Ci' and 'ty' were pulled from two different vocal-booth performances. 'That’s the minutiae that we were going through,' Szymczyk recalled. 'We were now into our nitpick phase. We were striving for the perfection of perfection.'"

== Critical reception ==
Billboard described the song as "a country flavored story of a girl who drives across town daily to meet someone a bit more suited to her than the one she lives with," and praised the instrumentals and harmony vocals. Cash Box said that "the instrumentation is lightly acoustic, with a sobbing pedal steel lacing together the plaintive lead vocal and chorus" and mentioned "the Eagles' uncanny talent for fitting hit-making riffs together." Billboard and Rolling Stone both ranked "Lyin' Eyes" as the Eagles' seventh-greatest song.

== Covers ==
Among the many covers of "Lyin' Eyes" are Lynn Anderson's 1976 recording and Kenny Rankin's 1980 version on his After The Roses album. Diamond Rio also covered the song on the 1993 compilation Common Thread: The Songs of the Eagles.

== Personnel ==
- Glenn Frey – lead vocals, acoustic guitar
- Don Felder – acoustic guitar
- Bernie Leadon – lead guitar, mandolin, backing vocals
- Randy Meisner – bass, backing vocals
- Don Henley – drums, percussion, harmony and backing vocals

Additional musician

- Jim Ed Norman – piano

== Charts ==
Chart (1975)	Peak position
Canada Top Singles (RPM)	19
Canada Adult Contemporary (RPM)	4
Canada Country Singles (RPM)	20
Ireland (IRMA)	3
Netherlands (Single Top 100)	23
New Zealand (Recorded Music NZ)	7
UK Singles (Official Charts)	23
US Billboard Hot 100	2
US Adult Contemporary (Billboard)	3
US Hot Country Songs (Billboard)	8

== Certifications ==
Region	Certification	Certified units/sales
New Zealand (RMNZ)	2× Platinum	60,000^{‡}
United Kingdom (BPI) Sales since 2013	Gold	400,000^{‡}
^{‡} Sales+streaming figures based on certification alone.
