= One of These Nights (Eagles song) =

- Netherlands picture sleeve, unusually crediting "The Eagles"

Single by Eagles

from the album One of These Nights
- B-side: "Visions"
- Released: May 19, 1975
- Genre: Rock; country rock; folk rock; R&B; disco
- Length: 4:55 (album version); 3:28 (single version)
- Label: Asylum
- Songwriters: Don Henley; Glenn Frey
- Producer: Bill Szymczyk

Eagles singles chronology
"Best of My Love" (1974)	"One of These Nights" (1975)	"Lyin' Eyes" (1975)

"One of These Nights" is a song by the American rock band Eagles, written by Don Henley and Glenn Frey. The title track from their 1975 One of These Nights album, the song became their second single to top the Billboard Hot 100 chart after "Best of My Love" and also helped propel the album to number one. The single version was shortened from the album version of the song, removing most of the song's intro and most of its fade-out, as well. Henley is lead vocalist on the verses, while Randy Meisner sings high harmony on the refrain. The song features a guitar solo by Don Felder that is "composed of blues-based licks and sustained string bends using an unusually meaty distortion tone."

== Background ==
The song was a conscious attempt by the band to write something different from a country-rock and ballad-type song. Don Henley said: "We like to be a nice little country-rock band from Los Angeles ... about half the time." He added, "We wanted to get away from the ballad syndrome with 'One of These Nights'. With Don Felder in the band now, we can really rock." Frey said that they "wanted 'One of These Nights' to have a lot of teeth, a lot of bite—a nasty track with pretty vocals."

The writing was influenced by R&B music and disco; according to Frey, he was listening to Spinners and Al Green records when he started writing the song. Frey started the writing process by composing the music, and Henley then started with the lyrics. Frey said: "I just went over to the piano and I started playing this little minor descending progression, and he comes over and goes, 'One of these nights'." Frey said: "What usually happens is when we get the thing fused together, he gets involved in the music and I get involved in the lyrics." While they were recording the album in Miami, the band also shared a studio with the Bee Gees, and according to Henley, the "four-on-the-floor" bass-drum pattern is a nod to disco.

In the liner notes of The Very Best Of, Frey had this to say about the song:

We had Don Henley's voice, which allowed us to go in a more soulful direction, which made me exceedingly happy ... A lot of things came together on One Of These Nights – our love of the studio, the dramatic improvement in Don's and my songwriting. We made a quantum leap with "One Of These Nights." It was a breakthrough song. It is my favorite Eagles record. If I ever had to pick one, it wouldn't be "Hotel California"; it wouldn't be "Take It Easy." For me, it would be "One Of These Nights."

Frey also said that the song is about putting things off. "We've all said, 'One of these nights I'm gonna do something -- get that girl, make that money, find that house.' We all have our dreams – a vision we hope will come true someday. When that 'someday' will come is up to each of us."

On the recording, Frey said: "We cut the basic track in Miami in December at Criteria Studios. We took it to L.A., put all the drone guitars and Felder's solo on in L.A., and went back to Miami to put the vocals on in March."

On an episode of In The Studio With Redbeard, Frey shares that Don Felder wrote the opening bass riff and taught it to Randy Meisner.

The B-side, "Visions", features lead vocals by guitarist Don Felder, the only Eagles song to do so.

== Reception ==
Billboard praised the "strong harmonies" and said that "One of These Nights" was similar to the Eagles' earlier song "Witchy Woman" at times. Cash Box said it had "a fresh, relaxed sound which should catapult the group to the top." Ultimate Classic Rock critic Sterling Whitaker rated it as the Eagles 6th most underrated song, praising Don Felder's "blazing" electric guitar solo.

== Personnel ==
- Don Henley – lead vocals, drums
- Glenn Frey – piano, backing vocals
- Don Felder – lead guitar, rhythm guitar
- Randy Meisner – bass guitar, backing vocals
- Bernie Leadon – rhythm guitar, backing vocals

== Charts ==
=== Weekly charts ===
Chart (1975)	Peak position
Australia (Kent Music Report)	33
Belgium (Ultratop 50 Flanders)	8
Belgium (Ultratop 50 Wallonia)	32
Canada Top Singles (RPM)	13
Canada Adult Contemporary (RPM)	18
Netherlands (Dutch Top 40)	5
Netherlands (Single Top 100)	7
New Zealand (Recorded Music NZ)	5
UK Singles (Official Charts)	23
US Billboard Hot 100	1
US Adult Contemporary (Billboard)	20

=== Year-end charts ===
Chart (1975)	Position
Canada Top Singles (RPM)	87
Netherlands (Dutch Top 40)	48
Netherlands (Single Top 100)	74
New Zealand (Recorded Music NZ)	15
US Billboard Hot 100	9

== Certifications ==
Region	Certification	Certified units/sales
New Zealand (RMNZ)	4× Platinum	120,000^{‡}
United Kingdom (BPI)	Gold	400,000^{‡}
^{‡} Sales+streaming figures based on certification alone.
