= Take It to the Limit (Eagles song) =

1975 single by Eagles

- European picture sleeve, mistitling the song as "Take It to the Limits"

Single by Eagles

from the album One of These Nights
- B-side: "After the Thrill Is Gone"
- Released: November 15, 1975
- Recorded: 1975
- Genre: Folk rock
- Length: 4:48 (album version); 3:48 (single version)
- Label: Asylum
- Songwriters: Randy Meisner; Don Henley; Glenn Frey
- Producer: Bill Szymczyk

Eagles singles chronology
"Lyin' Eyes" (1975)	"Take It to the Limit" (1975)	"New Kid in Town" (1976)

"Take It to the Limit" is a song by the Eagles from their fourth album One of These Nights from which it was issued as the third and last single on November 15, 1975. It reached No. 4 on the U.S. Billboard Hot 100 and was also Eagles' greatest success to that point in the United Kingdom, going to No. 12 on the charts. Billboard ranked it as the No. 25 song for 1976.

The song, written by Eagles members Randy Meisner, Don Henley and Glenn Frey, began as a solo composition by Meisner, who sang lead on it. As it remained unfinished when time came for the One of These Nights album to be recorded, Henley and Frey assisted Meisner in completing it. Meisner's performance of the song was popular with the audience in Eagles concerts but disputes over his reluctance to perform it would also directly lead to Meisner's departure from the band.

== Composition ==
According to Meisner, he wrote the first few lines of the song one night while playing an acoustic guitar after returning from the Troubadour; however he was not able to finish the song by the time they were close to recording it, and Frey and Henley then helped him with the lyrics. Meisner later said of how he would usually write songs with the Eagles: "I'd get a verse or two, and I'm done, and they would help fill in the blanks." Frey and Henley finished the song in a house they were sharing in Beverly Hills, together with many of the tracks for the album One of These Nights.

On the meaning of the song, Meisner said in the documentary History of the Eagles: "The line 'take it to the limit' was to keep trying before you reach a point in your life where you feel you've done everything and seen everything, sort of feeling, you know, part of getting old. And just to take it to the limit one more time, like every day just keep, you know, punching away at it ... That was the line, and from there the song took a different course."

"Take It to the Limit" is one of few Eagles tracks written in waltz time. (Other notable waltzes performed by the Eagles are "Hollywood Waltz" from One of These Nights; the Meisner/Henley/Frey waltz "Saturday Night" (co-written with Leadon) from the 1973 Desperado album; Frey's "Most of Us are Sad" from their self-titled debut album; Frey/Henley/JD Souther's hard-rocking "Teenage Jail" from 1979's "The Long Run" album; and Walsh's "Pretty Maids All in a Row" on the 1976 album Hotel California.)

== Recordings ==
"Take It to the Limit" is unique in the canon of the band's singles, being the lone A-side on which Randy Meisner sang lead, as well as the first A-side Eagles single on which neither Henley nor Frey sang lead. It was also the last Eagles single to feature founding member Bernie Leadon before he was replaced by guitarist Joe Walsh. The single version of the song is 3:48 in length, almost a minute shorter than the album version.

A live performance by Meisner from 1976 was recorded at The Forum, Inglewood, California. It is included in the album Eagles Live, which was released in 1980 after the band had effectively broken up. A second version, recorded in 1977, was released on 'Hotel California 40th Anniversary: Expanded Edition' released in 2017.

The song was rerecorded on Meisner's first solo album (Randy Meisner) released in 1978. The song was performed with piano and acoustic guitar accompaniment, and 1970s teen idol David Cassidy singing in the backing vocals.

== Live performances ==
Eagles - "Take It to the Limit"
The climax of the song as performed by Randy Meisner at a concert in 1976 (from Eagles Live). Meisner was concerned about not hitting the high notes (G♯_{5}, F♯_{5}), which generated applause when he succeeded in doing so. His reluctance to sing the song led to disputes and eventually his departure from the band.

Per Setlist.FM, the song has been performed live by the band over 870 times across their career – making it one of their top 20 most-performed songs. According to Frey, fans of the band loved Meisner's performance of "Take It to the Limit" at their concerts, and came to consider it his signature song within the band. Henley, too, noted that fans "went crazy when Randy hit those high notes". Meisner, however, was concerned about not being able to hit the high notes. Frey was insistent that Meisner should perform the song in concert for the fans, and live performances of the song then became a source of great contention between Frey and Meisner – eventually becoming one reason for Meisner's departure from the band.

Meisner had been struggling to hit the crucial high notes in the song during the Hotel California tour. According to Joe Walsh, Meisner could perform the song, but would become nervous when told he had to sing it. By the time they had reached Knoxville, Tennessee in June 1977, the band was feeling the strain of a long tour, with Meisner unhappy and suffering from a stomach ulcer. Meisner decided not to sing the song for an encore because he had been up late and caught the flu. Frey and Meisner then became involved in an angry physical confrontation backstage over Meisner's refusal to perform the song. After the altercation, Meisner was frozen out from the band and he decided to leave. He left the band at the end of their tour in September 1977 and was replaced by Timothy B. Schmit – coincidentally, the bassist who had replaced him in Poco.

The song was only played sporadically by the band following Meisner's departure, with Frey taking over on lead vocals. Originally in B major, the song was transposed to G major to accommodate Frey's vocal range. Prior to the band's reunion, its last performance by the band came as part of The Long Run tour in Oklahoma City on February 14, 1980. Frey did, however, perform the song as part of his solo tour in 1986, as documented on the posthumous 2021 live album Feelin' the Heat. The song was ultimately revived for the Eagles' late 1999 shows at Los Angeles' Staples Center, with the song again sung by Frey. For the band's 2017 shows onwards, lead vocals were taken by Vince Gill and was transposed to A major.

In 2016, both Joe Walsh and Don Felder performed the song as part of their respective solo tours.

== Reception ==
Billboard described "Take It to the Limit" as "a strong mid-tempo rocker" with "distinctive harmonies" that sounds like the Beach Boys at times. Cash Box called it "a masterpiece of a background" with "more of the easygoing melodies and lyrics that have made [the Eagles] so hot over their last several releases." Record World said that "The group's harmony sound grows more attractive with each successive listening on this irresistible ballad."

== Personnel ==
- Randy Meisner – lead vocals, bass
- Glenn Frey – 12-string acoustic rhythm guitar, backing vocals
- Don Henley – drums, backing vocals
- Don Felder – lead guitar
- Bernie Leadon – rhythm guitar
- Jim Ed Norman – piano, conductor, string arrangements

Live version from 1976:

- Randy Meisner – lead vocals, bass
- Glenn Frey – piano, backing vocals
- Don Henley – drums, backing vocals
- Don Felder – lead guitar, backing vocals
- Joe Walsh – 12-string acoustic rhythm guitar, backing vocals

== Charts and certifications ==
=== Weekly charts ===
Chart (1975–1976)	Peak position
Australia (Kent Music Report)	30
Canada Top Singles (RPM)	16
Canada Adult Contemporary (RPM)	6
New Zealand (Recorded Music NZ)	23
UK Singles (Official Charts)	12
US Billboard Hot 100	4
US Adult Contemporary (Billboard)	4
US Cash Box Top 100	5

=== Year-end charts ===
Chart (1976)	Rank
Canada	139
US Billboard Hot 100	25
US Cash Box	56

=== Certifications ===
Certifications for "Take It to the Limit"
Region	Certification	Certified units/sales
New Zealand (RMNZ)	Platinum	30,000^{‡}
United Kingdom (BPI)	Silver	200,000^{‡}
^{‡} Sales+streaming figures based on certification alone.

== Waylon Jennings and Willie Nelson version ==
"Take It to the Limit"

Single by Willie Nelson and Waylon Jennings

from the album Take It to the Limit
- B-side: "'Til I Gain Control Again"
- Released: October 8, 1983
- Genre: Country
- Length: 3:50
- Label: Columbia
- Songwriters: Randy Meisner, Don Henley, Glenn Frey
- Producers: Willie Nelson, Waylon Jennings

Willie Nelson singles chronology
"Why Do I Have to Choose" (1983)	"Take It to the Limit" (1983)	"Without a Song" (1984)

Waylon Jennings singles chronology
"Hold On, I'm Comin'" (1983)	"Take It to the Limit" (1983)	"The Conversation" (1983)

The song was covered by country musicians Willie Nelson and Waylon Jennings as the title track of their duet album, Take It to the Limit, which was released in 1983.

=== Chart performance ===
Chart (1983–1984)	Peak position
Canada Country Singles (RPM)	1
US Hot Country Songs (Billboard)	8
US Bubbling Under Hot 100 (Billboard)	2
US Adult Contemporary (Billboard)	31

== Other versions ==
- The song was covered in 1977 by Etta James for her album Deep in the Night.
- By Tom Jones on his 1980s television show
- In 1993, Suzy Bogguss recorded the song for the album Common Thread: The Songs of the Eagles.
- Covered by Dave Mason on his album Certified Live 1976.
