= Glenn Frey Live =

Live album by Glenn Frey
- Released: July 2, 1993
- Recorded: July 8, 1992
- Venue: The Stadium, Dublin, Ireland
- Genre: Rock
- Length: 70:21
- Label: MCA
- Producer: Elliot Scheiner and Glenn Frey

Glenn Frey chronology
Strange Weather (1992)	Glenn Frey Live (1993)	Solo Collection (1995)

Professional ratings
Review scores
Source	Rating
Allmusic	link

Glenn Frey Live is a live album by Glenn Frey, released in 1993. In 2018, Universal Music released a four-disc pack entitled Above the Clouds, in honor of Glenn Frey after his death in 2016, which features fully remastered video of the concert featured on this album (including omitted songs).

== Reception ==
Juke said, "Half of this material is from Frey's old band. The new stuff, save for the lovely "The One You Love", fails to spark. The LPs reason for being is hard to grasp."

== Track listing ==
1. "Peaceful Easy Feeling" (Jack Tempchin) – 2:35
2. "New Kid in Town" (JD Souther, Frey, Don Henley) – 6:08
3. "The One You Love" (Frey, Tempchin) – 5:15
4. "Wild Mountain Thyme" (Bert Jansch (Note: more correctly attributed to Francis McPeake)) – 4:31
5. "Strange Weather" (Frey, Tempchin, Jay Oliver) – 5:04
6. "I've Got Mine" (Frey, Tempchin) – 5:57
7. "Lyin' Eyes/Take It Easy" [medley] (Henley, Frey (Note: Frey and Jackson Browne are the co-writers of "Take It Easy", but Browne is uncredited here)) – 5:55
8. "River of Dreams" (Frey, Tempchin) – 4:57
9. "True Love" (Frey, Tempchin) – 5:24
10. "Love in the 21st Century" (Frey, Tempchin, Danny Kortchmar) – 6:09
11. "Smuggler's Blues" (Frey, Tempchin) – 3:50
12. "The Heat Is On" (Keith Forsey, Harold Faltermeyer) – 4:30
13. "Heartache Tonight" (Henley, Bob Seger, Souther, Frey) – 6:03
14. "Desperado" (Henley, Frey) – 4:03

== Omitted songs ==
MCA video released the entire concert on video as Glenn Frey: Strange Weather Live, in 1992. Because there was not enough room on the Live CD, the concert includes three songs (all from Frey's solo career) that the CD left out. The concert opens with the Strange Weather album track "Long Hot Summer", the 1988 single "Livin' Right" appears halfway through, and 1982's "Partytown" is part of the encore.

== Personnel ==
- Glenn Frey – lead vocals, guitars
- Jay Oliver – keyboards, backing vocals
- Barry Sarna – keyboards, backing vocals
- Danny Grenier – guitars, backing vocals
- Duane Sciacqua – guitars, backing vocals
- Bryan Garofalo – bass, backing vocals
- Marty Fera – drums
- Chris Mostert – percussion, saxophones
- Michito Sanchez – percussion
- Al Garth – saxophones, violin
- Greg Smith – baritone saxophone
- Darrell Leonard – trumpet

== Production ==
- Glenn Frey – producer, liner notes
- Elliot Scheiner – producer, engineer, mixing
- Mad Dog Ranch (Showmass, Colorado) – mixing location
- Yutaka Nishimura – photography
- Peacock Marketing & Design – design
