= Solo Collection =

Greatest hits album by Glenn Frey
- Released: March 28, 1995
- Recorded: 1982–1994
- Genre: Rock
- Length: 65:13
- Label: MCA
- Producer: Various

Glenn Frey chronology
Glenn Frey Live (1993)	Solo Collection (1995)	After Hours (2012)

Solo Collection is a greatest hits album of American musician Glenn Frey's solo career, released March 28, 1995 on MCA Records.

== Reception ==
Professional ratings
Review scores
Source	Rating
Allmusic	4.5/5 stars

AllMusic reviewer Stephen Thomas Erlewine gave the album four and a half stars out of five, stating "Solo Collection performs a welcome service by collecting the highlights from his decidedly uneven solo albums, including all of his biggest hits. Not only is it a perfect introduction, it's arguably the most consistent solo record Frey ever released."

The album did not chart in its initial 1995 release, but reached number 82 on the U.S. Billboard 200 in 2016 after Frey's death.

== Track listing ==
1. "This Way to Happiness" (Frey, Oliver, Tempchin) – 3:26
2. "Who's Been Sleeping in My Bed?" (Tempchin, Whitlock) – 4:05
3. "Common Ground" (Frey, Tempchin) – 4:43
4. "Call on Me" (Frey, Tempchin) – 4:10
5. "The One You Love" (Frey, Tempchin) – 4:33
6. "Sexy Girl" (Frey, Tempchin) – 3:30
7. "Smuggler's Blues" (Frey, Tempchin) – 3:50
8. "The Heat Is On" (Harold Faltermeyer, Keith Forsey) – 3:46
9. "You Belong to the City" (Frey, Tempchin) – 5:52
10. "True Love" (Frey, Tempchin) – 4:40
11. "Soul Searchin'" (Cameron, Frey, Tempchin) – 5:35
12. "Part of Me, Part of You" (Frey, Tempchin) – 5:57
13. "I've Got Mine" (Frey, Tempchin) – 5:35
14. "River of Dreams" (Frey, Tempchin) – 6:08
15. "Rising Sun/Brave New World" (Frey, Oliver, Scheiner, Tempchin) – 7:00
16. "Strange Weather" (live) (Frey, Tempchin, Oliver) – 5:04 (only available on the import version)

== Charts ==
Chart (2016)	Peak position
US Billboard 200	82
