= Richard F. W. Davis =

American musician, record producer, digital editor and composer

- Born: December 30, 1966 (age 59); Lawrence, Kansas, United States
- Occupations: Musician, songwriter, record producer, digital editor, keyboardist

Richard F. W. Davis is an American musician, record producer, digital editor and composer known for performing and working with such artists as Glenn Frey, Don Henley, Eagles, Alanis Morissette and Wendy & Lisa. He has been at various points an award-winning sound designer and editor (on such shows as Twin Peaks), a music editor on many TV shows and films, a digital editor on many records, a mixer, programmer and co-composer on TV shows and films, and a producer and editor for various projects with the Eagles, including music producer on History of the Eagles, for which he won an Emmy. He also toured the world with the Eagles as one of the three keyboard players, starting with the Long Road Out of Eden Tour in October 2007 and continuing until the end of the History of the Eagles Tour in July 2015. He now works out of his home studio, Echolalia, in Austin, Texas, and produces, edits and supervises Eagles releases, while enjoying life with his wife and daughter.
