= Strange Weather (Glenn Frey album) =

Studio album by Glenn Frey
- Released: June 23, 1992
- Recorded: November 1991–March 1992
- Studio: Bill Schnee Studios, Cherokee Studios and Soundcastle (Hollywood, California); Mad Dog Ranch (Crawford, Colorado)
- Genre: Rock, pop rock, soft rock
- Length: 65:13
- Label: MCA
- Producer: Glenn Frey; Elliot Scheiner; Don Was

Glenn Frey chronology
Soul Searchin' (1988)	Strange Weather (1992)	Glenn Frey Live (1993)

Professional ratings
Review scores
Source	Rating
Allmusic	link

Strange Weather is the fourth solo studio album by Glenn Frey, the guitarist and co-lead vocalist for the Eagles. It was released in 1992 by MCA. Though considered an improvement from Frey's previous album by most critics, it went largely unnoticed by the public. It was a commercial disappointment, failing to chart in the US, and none of its three singles reached the Top 40, a first for Frey. "Part of Me, Part of You" was earlier released as part of the Thelma and Louise soundtrack and peaked at #55.

It was his last album of original material before his death in 2016, as his next album, After Hours (2012), would consist primarily of covers.

== Critical reception ==
Reviewing for AllMusic, critic William Ruhlmann wrote of the album "With his solo career fading, Glenn Frey got serious on his fourth album, but many of the album's sentiments sounded strange coming from him." In a review for The Rolling Stone Album Guide (1992), Mark Coleman gave the album three out of five stars and wrote that "Frey seemed determined to make a statement. "Love in the 21st Century" was a catchy but deposable rocker in the vein of his Beverly Hills Cop soundtrack hit "The Heat Is On", but both "I've Got Mine" and "He Took Advantage (Blues for Ronald Reagan)" found him stumbling around in the same rich-rock-star-as-self-righteous-angry-liberal footsteps as Henley."

== Track listing ==
All songs by Glenn Frey and Jack Tempchin, except where noted.

No.	Title	Writer(s)	Length
1.	"Silent Spring" (instrumental prelude)	Glenn Frey, Jay Oliver	0:40
2.	"Long Hot Summer"	Frey, Jack Tempchin, David "Hawk" Wolinski	5:17
3.	"Strange Weather"	Frey, Oliver, Tempchin	5:03
4.	"Aqua Tranquillo" (instrumental)	Frey	0:50
5.	"Love in the 21st Century"	Frey, Danny Kortchmar, Tempchin	6:12
6.	"He Took Advantage (Blues for Ronald Reagan)"		4:42
7.	"River of Dreams"		6:07
8.	"I've Got Mine"		5:35
9.	"Rising Sun" (instrumental)	Frey, Oliver	0:38
10.	"Brave New World"		6:20
11.	"Delicious"		3:47
12.	"A Walk in the Dark"	Frey, Oliver	5:18
13.	"Before the Ship Goes Down"		4:31
14.	"Big Life"		4:18
15.	"Part of Me, Part of You"		5:57

The Japanese edition contained a bonus track, "Ain't It Love".

== Personnel ==
- Glenn Frey – lead vocals, backing vocals, all instruments and programming (1–14), acoustic guitar (15), arrangements
- Jay Oliver – all instruments and programming (1–14), additional keyboards (15)
- Robbie Kilgore – additional keyboards (1–14)
- Mike Harlow – additional programming (1–14)
- Scott Thurston – acoustic piano (15)
- Benmont Tench – organ (15)
- Mark Goldenberg – guitars (15)
- Jerry Scheff – bass (15)
- Kenny Aronoff – drums (15)
- Lenny Castro – percussion (1–14)
- Al Garth – saxophone solo (7)
- Chris Mostert – saxophone solo (8)
- The Heart Attack Horns:
  - Greg Smith – baritone saxophone, arrangements
  - Bill Bergman – tenor saxophone
  - John Berry Jr. – trumpet
  - Roy Wiegand – trumpet
- Rosemary Butler – backing vocals
- Valerie Carter – backing vocals
- Bobby Martin – backing vocals

== Production ==
- Glenn Frey – producer
- Elliot Scheiner – producer, engineer, mixing
- Don Was – producer (15)
- Mike Harlow – engineer
- Tim Nitz – second engineer
- Chris Rich – second engineer
- Ted Jensen – digital editing and mastering at Sterling Sound (New York, NY)
- Ivy Skoff – production coordinator
- Vartan Kurjian – art direction
- Sarajo Frieden – design
- Carl Johansen – cover art
- Caroline Greyshock – photography

== Charts ==
Chart (1992)	Peak position
Australian Albums (ARIA)	120
Dutch Albums (Album Top 100)	75
German Albums (Offizielle Top 100)	89
Swedish Albums (Sverigetopplistan)	34
Swiss Albums (Schweizer Hitparade)	23
