= After Hours (Glenn Frey album) =

Studio album by Glenn Frey
- Released: May 8, 2012
- Recorded: October 2011 – February 2012
- Genre: Traditional jazz
- Length: 39:19 / 48:13 Deluxe Edition
- Label: Universal Music Enterprises
- Producer: Glenn Frey, Richard F.W. Davis, Michael Thompson

Glenn Frey chronology
Solo Collection (1995)	After Hours (2012)	Above the Clouds: The Collection (2018)

Professional ratings
Review scores
Source	Rating
AllMusic	3/5 stars

After Hours is the fifth and final solo studio album by Glenn Frey, released in 2012 (see 2012 in music), four years before his death. The album is very different from Frey's previous rock albums and features material from the Great American Songbook. The album charted at number 116 in the U.S. and number 92 in the UK. After Hours was Frey's first new studio solo album in 20 years since 1992's Strange Weather, which was a commercial disappointment.

== Track listing ==
1. "For Sentimental Reasons" (William "Pat" Best, Deek Watson) – 3:03
2. "My Buddy" (Walter Donaldson, Gus Kahn) – 3:45
3. "The Good Life" (Sacha Distel, Jack Reardon) – 2:25 (Deluxe Edition only)
4. "Route 66" (Bobby Troup) – 2:57
5. "The Shadow of Your Smile" (Johnny Mandel, Paul Francis Webster) – 4:28
6. "Here's to Life" (Artie Butler, Phyllis Molinary) – 5:32
7. "It's Too Soon to Know" (Deborah Chessler) – 2:42
8. "Caroline, No" (Brian Wilson, Tony Asher) – 4:00
9. "The Look of Love" (Burt Bacharach, Hal David) – 3:33
10. "I'm Getting Old Before My Time" (Una Mae Carlisle) – 3:43
11. "Worried Mind" (Ted Daffan, Jimmie H. Davis) – 2:48 (Deluxe Edition only)
12. "I Wanna Be Around" (Johnny Mercer, Sadie Vimmerstedt) – 2:19 (Deluxe Edition only)
13. "Same Girl" (Randy Newman) – 3:05
14. "After Hours" (Glenn Frey, Jack Tempchin) – 4:18

== Personnel ==
- Glenn Frey – vocals, backing vocals (1, 6)
- Richard F.W. Davis – keyboards (1, 2, 5, 6, 11), horns (8), horn arrangements (9)
- Michael Thompson – acoustic piano, guitars (1, 4), organ (2), electric guitar (3, 6), vibraphone (4), electric piano (5, 7), accordion (7), acoustic guitar (7), trombone (7)
- Steuart Smith – electric guitar (2, 9, 11), acoustic guitar (8)
- Greg Leisz – steel guitar (3, 7)
- Mike Harlow – baritone guitar (7)
- Reggie McBride – bass (1–6, 9, 10, 11)
- Jonathan Clark – electric upright bass (8)
- Scott Crago – drums (1–4, 6–9, 11)
- Lenny Castro – congas (3, 8), bongos (7), percussion (8)
- Stephanie O'Keefe – French horn (2, 5, 6)
- Tom Evans – tenor saxophone (4), flute (5), clarinet (6, 7, 11), English horn (7, 11), tenor sax solo (9)
- Al Garth – recorder (7)
- Greg Smith – alto saxophone (9)
- Chris Mostert – tenor saxophone (9)
- Bill Armstrong – flugelhorn (8)
- Nick Lane – trombone (9)
- Les Lovitt – trumpet (9)
- Mitch Manker – trumpet solo (9)

Orchestra

- Alan Broadbent – orchestral arrangements and conductor, string arrangements (5)
- Richard Davis – string arrangements (5)
- Marcy Vaj – contractor
- Kevin Axt and Putter Smith – bass
- Jodi Burnett, Ira Glansbeek, Paula Hochhalter, Timothy Loo and Elizabeth Wright – cello
- Brett Banducci, Robert Berg, Suzanna Giordano Gignac, Margot MacLaine and Novi Novog – viola
- Jackie Brand, Chung Mei Chang, Mario DeLeon, Michael Ferril, Eric Gorfain, Scott Hosfeld, Dimitrie Leivici, Maria Newman, Neli Nikolaeva, Alyssa Park, Cameron Patrick, Susan Rishik, Anatoly Rosinski, Olivia Tsui, Marcy Vaj, Deb Vukovitz, Amy Wickman, Margaret Wooten and Adriana Zoppo – violin

== Production ==
- Richard F.W. Davis – producer, arrangements, engineer, digital engineer
- Glenn Frey – producer, arrangements
- Michael Thompson – producer, arrangements
- Mike Harlow – engineer
- Elliot Scheiner – orchestra recording, mixing
- Dan Garcia – orchestra recording assistant
- Schnee Studios (North Hollywood, California) – orchestra recording location
- Bob Ludwig – mastering at Gateway Mastering (Portland, Maine)
- Ivy Skoff – production coordinator
- Jeri Heiden for SMOG Design, Inc. – art direction
- Nick Steinhardt for SMOG Design, Inc. – design
- Jim Sheldon – photography
- Autumn de Wilde – photography
- Irving Azoff – management

== Charts ==
Chart (2012)	Peak position
Belgian Albums (Ultratop Wallonia)	180
New Zealand Albums (RMNZ)	34
Scottish Albums (OCC)	93
UK Albums (OCC)	92
US Billboard 200	116
US Top Rock Albums (Billboard)	38
