= Soul Searching =

Soul Searching or Soul Searchin' may refer to:

- Soul Searching (Average White Band album), 1976
- Soul Searching (Shirley Scott album), 1959
- Soul Searchin' (Glenn Frey album), 1988
  - "Soul Searchin'" (Glenn Frey song), the album's title track
- "Soul Searching", a Ronnie Earl album, 1988
- "Soul Searchin'" (Brian Wilson and Andy Paley song), 1990s
- Soul Searchin' (Jimmy Barnes album), 2016
- Soul Searching (mixtape), 2019
- "Soul Searching", an episode of Power Rangers Wild Force
- "Soul Searching", a song by Little River Band from the album Monsoon
- "Soul Searching", a track from the soundtrack of the 2014 Indian film Jigarthanda

== See also ==
- Soul Search, album by Joe Morris
