= Chris Mostert =

Dutch saxophonist

Christiaan Mostert is a Dutch saxophonist who has played with the Eagles during their "Farewell 1 Tour" in 2005. He is part of the Mighty Horns. Besides his work with the Eagles, Mostert has also played on solo tours of Don Henley, Joe Walsh and Glenn Frey, and been he also been a member of the bands, Goose Creek Symphony, Pollution, Sylvester and the Hot Band. He also performed on three solo albums by Glenn Frey, Soul Searchin' (including the saxophone solo in the hit single True Love), Strange Weather and After Hours. In 2004 he recorded a solo album Midnight Breeze, accompanied by a.o. Jeff Baxter, Burleigh Drummond and Steve Gadd. He also worked on the last studio album by the Eagles "Long Road Out of Eden".

== Partial discography ==
- Glenn Frey - "After Hours" (2012)
- Eagles - "Long Road Out of Eden" (2007)
- Hank Ballard & The Midnighters - "From Love to Tears" (1998)
- Max Carl and the Big Dance - "One Planet – One Groove" (1998)
- Teri Ann Linn - "Teri" (1998)
- Joe Esposito - "Treated and Released" (1996)
- Glenn Frey - "Glenn Frey Live" (1993)
- Michael Damian - "Reach out to Me" (1993)
- John Stewart - "Bullets in the Hour Glass" (1992)
- Glenn Frey - "Strange Weather" (1992)
- Peter Cetera - "World Falling Down" (1992)
- Smokey Robinson - "Double Good Everything" (1991)
- Glenn Frey - "Soul Searchin'" (1988)
- John Stewart - "Secret Tapes" (1986)
- Julie Brown - "Trapped in the Body of a White Girl" (1987)
- Sylvester & the Hot Band - "Bazaar" (1973)
- Sylvester - "Sylvester & the Hot Band" (1973)
