= No Fun Aloud =

Studio album by Glenn Frey
- Released: June 1982
- Recorded: Early Fall, 1981 – Spring, 1982
- Studios: Wilder Bros. Studios and Rudy Records (Los Angeles, California); Muscle Shoals Sound Studio (Sheffield, Alabama); Bayshore Recording Studios (Coconut Grove, Florida)
- Genres: Rock; pop rock; soft rock
- Length: 39:21
- Label: Asylum
- Producers: Glenn Frey; Allan Blazek; Jim Ed Norman

Glenn Frey chronology
No Fun Aloud (1982)	The Allnighter (1984)

Professional ratings
Review scores
Source	Rating
AllMusic	3/5 stars
The Encyclopedia of Popular Music	2/5 stars
MusicHound Rock: The Essential Album Guide	3/5 stars
The Rolling Stone Album Guide	2/5 stars

No Fun Aloud is the debut solo studio album by Glenn Frey. It was released in June 1982 on Asylum.

The album reached #32 on the charts and contained two top 40 singles, "The One You Love" and "I Found Somebody". The album was certified Gold by the Recording Industry Association of America (RIAA), selling over 500,000 copies in the United States.

== Critical reception ==
AllMusic critic Mike DeGagne wrote that "it's Frey's perfectly guided vocals and impeccable talent for crafting laid-back love songs that make[s] the album noteworthy ... With Frey's own production assistance, No Fun Aloud stands up as a modest debut album." The Rolling Stone Album Guide called No Fun Aloud "a predictably slick solo debut in [Frey's] old band's party-boy mode." The Globe and Mail called it "remarkably uninspired and joyless," writing that "by and large, the songs are of the John David Souther school of no-melody dirge—the type of thing that gives California music a bad name." The New York Times deemed it "an agreeable, well-crafted little record."

== Track listing ==
All songs by Glenn Frey and Jack Tempchin, except where noted.

No.	Title	Writer(s)	Length
1.	"I Found Somebody"		4:05
2.	"The One You Love"		4:34
3.	"Partytown"		2:57
4.	"I Volunteer"	Jack Tempchin, Bill Bodine	4:06
5.	"I've Been Born Again"	Don Davis, James Dean	4:36
6.	"Sea Cruise"	Huey "Piano" Smith, Johnny Vincent	2:36
7.	"That Girl"	Glenn Frey, Bob Seger	3:41
8.	"All Those Lies"	Glenn Frey	4:43
9.	"She Can't Let Go"		3:11
10.	"Don't Give Up"		4:48
Total length:			39:21

== Personnel ==
- Glenn Frey – vocals, organ (1), lead guitar (1, 3, 4, 8), electric piano (2, 5, 7, 8), guitars (2, 5, 10), bass (2), drums (2), acoustic piano (3), backing vocals (4, 10), all other instruments (9), clavinet (10), synthesizers (10)
- David "Hawk" Wolinski – synthesizers (1, 10), organ (4, 6–8)
- Clayton Ivey – acoustic piano (6)
- Allan Blazek – additional keyboards (10)
- Josh Leo – guitars (1, 3)
- Danny Kortchmar – guitars (4)
- Duncan Cameron – electric guitar (6–8)
- Wayne Perkins – acoustic guitar (7)
- Bryan Garofalo – bass (1)
- Bob Glaub – bass (3, 5, 10)
- Roberto Piñón – bass (4)
- David Hood – bass (6–8)
- Michael Huey – drums (1, 3, 4, 10)
- John Robinson – drums (5)
- Roger Hawkins – drums (6–8), bells (7, 8)
- Steve Forman – percussion (5, 9)
- Al Garth – tenor saxophone (1)
- Jim Horn – saxophone (2)
- Ernie Watts – saxophone (2)
- Ronnie Eades – saxophone (6)
- Harvey Thompson – saxophone (6)
- Jim Ed Norman – string arrangements (2, 7)
- Marcy Levy – backing vocals (4)
- Bill Champlin – backing vocals (4)
- Tom Kelly – backing vocals (4)
- Julia Tillman Waters – backing vocals (8, 10)
- Maxine Waters Willard – backing vocals (8, 10)
- Oren Waters – backing vocals (8, 10)

The Heart Attack Horns on "I've Been Born Again"

- Jim Coile – alto saxophone
- Greg Smith – baritone saxophone
- Bill Bergman – tenor saxophone
- John Berry Jr. – trumpet
- Lee Thornburg – trumpet, horn arrangements
- Jim Ed Norman – horn arrangements

The Monstertones on "Partytown"

- Irving Azoff (Urban Azoff)
- Ray Blair (Ollie Blair)
- Allan Blazek (Leon Blazek)
- Jimmy Buffett (Freddy Buffett)
- Peter Fleming
- Glenn Frey (Duane Monstertone)
- Hugh Gotteny
- Jingles Squirrel Heart
- Tom Kelly (Tommy Obnozzio)
- Marion Kinde
- John McEnroe
- Peter Rennert
- Larry Solters (Pee Wee Solters)
- Jack Tempchin (Floyd Tempchin)
- Buckley Wideface

== Production ==
- Jim Ed Norman – producer
- Glenn Frey – producer, assistant engineer, concept
- Allan Blazek – producer, engineer, mixing, concept
- Steve Melton – engineer
- Ray Blair – assistant engineer
- George Gomez – assistant engineer
- Ben King – assistant engineer
- Mary Beth McLemore – assistant engineer
- Jay Parti – assistant engineer
- Jeff Adamoff – art direction, design
- Jim Shea – photography
- Irving Azoff for Front Line Management – direction

== Charts ==
Chart (1982)	Peak position
Australian Albums (Kent Music Report)	44
Dutch Albums (Album Top 100)	34
Swedish Albums (Sverigetopplistan)	39
US Billboard 200	32

== Certifications ==
Region	Certification	Certified units/sales
United States (RIAA)	Gold	500,000^{^}
^{^} Shipments figures based on certification alone.
