= The Allnighter (album) =

Studio album by Glenn Frey
- Released: July 1984
- Recorded: August 1983 – March 1984
- Studios: Wilder Bros. Studios (Los Angeles, California); Muscle Shoals Sound Studio (Sheffield, Alabama); Ocean Way Recording (Hollywood, California); Caribou Ranch (Nederland, Colorado)
- Genres: Rock, blue-eyed soul
- Length: 43:09
- Label: MCA
- Producers: Glenn Frey; Barry Beckett; Allan Blazek

Glenn Frey chronology
No Fun Aloud (1982)	The Allnighter (1984)	Soul Searchin' (1988)

UK cover

The Allnighter is the second solo studio album by Glenn Frey, the guitarist and co-lead vocalist for the Eagles. The album was released in mid-1984 on MCA in the United States and the United Kingdom, two years after Frey's modestly successful debut album No Fun Aloud and four years after the demise of the Eagles. It was and still is Frey's most successful solo album throughout his whole solo career, having reached No. 22 on the Billboard charts, and releasing two top 20 singles with "Smuggler's Blues" and "Sexy Girl". The album achieved gold status by the RIAA in the US. It is generally regarded as the culmination of the smoother, more adult-oriented sound of Frey's solo work.

The single "Smuggler's Blues" helped to inspire the Miami Vice episode of the same name, and Frey was invited to star in that episode, which was Frey's acting debut. The music video for the single also won Frey an MTV Video Music Award in 1985.

== Composition ==
When Frey was asked about his song writing partnership with Jack Tempchin, he said at the time that "It's funny, there are only those certain people where things click — at least for me. He's very free. I'll just run some soul licks by him, or I'll ring him something like The Allnighter, which originally was just about staying up all night. But then we started talking about it and Jack says, ‘Staying up all night can't play over three or four verses. What if the Allnighter was a guy?’ So, we made him into some woman's every-guy." The lyrics of "Better in the U.S.A" are opposed to the Soviet Union.

== Critical reception ==
In a contemporary review for The Village Voice, music critic Robert Christgau gave The Alnighter a "C" and panned it as a "smarmy piece of sexist pseudosoul". In a retrospective review for The Rolling Stone Album Guide (1992), Mark Coleman gave the album two out of five stars and wrote that it "glistens with synthesized oomph, but the sugar coating doesn't sit well on Frey's mannered white R&B loverman act." On the other hand, AllMusic's William Ruhlmann retrospectively gave it four-and-a-half stars and said that it departs from the "old Eagles sound" of Frey's last album for a "bluesy, rocking feel."

== Track listing ==
All songs by Glenn Frey and Jack Tempchin, except where noted.

No.	Title	Length
1.	"The Allnighter"	4:22
2.	"Sexy Girl"	3:30
3.	"I Got Love"	3:49
4.	"Somebody Else" (Hawk Wolinski, Frey, Tempchin)	6:00
5.	"Lover's Moon"	4:10
6.	"Smuggler's Blues"	4:20
7.	"Let's Go Home"	5:01
8.	"Better in the U.S.A."	3:00
9.	"Living in Darkness" (Frey, Tempchin, Wolinski)	4:35
10.	"New Love"	4:25
Total length:		43:09

Additional track

Bonus track on European and Asian releases
No. / Title / Length; 9. / "The Heat Is On" (Harold Faltermeyer, Keith Forsey) / 3:45

== Personnel ==
Musicians

- Glenn Frey – vocals, electric piano (1, 10), electric guitar (1–2, 4, 6, 8–9), bass guitar (2, 5), guitars (3), organ (5), acoustic guitar (5), synthesizers (6), slide guitar (6), acoustic piano (8), celesta (10)
- David "Hawk" Wolinski – synthesizers (1), organ (1, 7, 10), keyboards (4), synthesizer programming (4, 9), fuzz guitar (4)
- Barry Beckett – synthesizers (2), acoustic piano (2, 8), keyboards (3)
- Nick DeCaro – accordion (5), string arrangements (5)
- Vince Melamed – electric piano (7)
- Duncan Cameron – lead guitar (2), guitars (3), electric guitar (5–8), acoustic guitar (10)
- Jack Tempchin – acoustic guitar (5)
- Josh Leo – electric guitar (6–7, 10)
- Bryan Garofalo – bass guitar (1, 6–7, 9, 10)
- David Hood – bass guitar (3, 8)
- John Robinson – drums (1–4)
- Larrie Londin – drums (2–3, 8)
- Michael Huey – drums (6–7, 10)
- Steve Forman – percussion (1, 9), congas (6)
- Victor Feldman – vibraphone (7)
- Al Garth – saxophone (4, 7)
- Bill Bergman – saxophone (9)
- Lee Thornburg – flugelhorn (10)

The Heart Attack Horns (tracks 3, 7 & 9)

- Bill Bergman – saxophones
- Jim Colie – saxophones
- Greg Smith – saxophones, horn arrangements (9)
- John Berry Jr. – trumpet
- Lee Thornburg – trumpet, horn arrangements (3, 7)

Background vocals

- Duncan Cameron – backing vocals (2, 8–9), harmony vocals (5)
- Glenn Frey – backing vocals (2, 4, 7–10)
- Roy Galloway – backing vocals (2, 4, 7–10)
- Jack Tempchin – backing vocals (2, 8)
- Luther Waters – backing vocals (2, 8)
- Oren Waters – backing vocals (2, 4, 7–10)

== Production ==
- Glenn Frey – producer
- Allan Blazek – producer, engineer, mixing
- Barry Beckett – producer (2, 3, 8)
- Ray Blair – second engineer
- Steve Melton – second engineer
- Lee Daley – assistant engineer
- Pete Greene – assistant engineer
- Rich Markowitz – assistant engineer
- Jeff Adamoff – art direction
- Dave Sizer – illustration
- Jim Shea – photography
- The Fitzgerald Hartley Co. – management

== Charts ==
Chart (1984–1985)	Peak position
Canada Top Albums/CDs (RPM)	57
Swedish Albums (Sverigetopplistan)	40
UK Albums (Official Charts)	31
US Billboard 200	22

== Certifications ==
Region	Certification	Certified units/sales
United States (RIAA)	Gold	500,000^{^}
^{^} Shipments figures based on certification alone.

== See also ==
- List of albums released in 1984
