= Livin' Right (song) =

Single by Glenn Frey

from the album Soul Searchin'
- B-side: "Soul Searchin'"
- Released: March 1989
- Genre: Pop rock
- Length: 5:07
- Label: MCA
- Songwriter(s): Glenn Frey; Jack Tempchin
- Producer(s): Elliot Scheiner; Glenn Frey

Glenn Frey singles chronology
"Soul Searchin'" (1989)	"Livin' Right" (1989)	"Part of Me, Part of You" (1991)

"Livin' Right" is a song by American musician and singer-songwriter Glenn Frey, a former member of the Eagles. It was released as a single from his third solo studio album Soul Searchin' in 1989. The single features the track "Soul Searchin'" as the B-side, which was also released as a single from the album, before "Livin' Right". Unlike the other singles from the album, it was not as successful as it reached a poor peak position of No. 90 on the Billboard Hot 100, but it charted at No. 22 on the Adult Contemporary chart.

== Background ==
In the liner notes to the original album, Glenn Frey wrote of the song, "My anthem to fitness. Jack [Tempchin] and I both started working out, eating right and generally tightening up our acts. Having tried nearly every other way to feel good, we've wound up back in gym class. Who'd of thunk it!"

== Personnel ==
- Glenn Frey – lead and backing vocals, keyboards, guitars, bass, percussion, arrangements
- Hawk Wolinski – keyboards, arrangements
- Russ Kunkel – drums
- Steve Forman – percussion
- The Heart Attack Horns – horns
- Bill Bergman – saxophone solo
- Greg Smith – horn arrangements

== Charts ==
Chart (1989)	Peak position
US Billboard Hot 100	90
US Adult Contemporary (Billboard)	22
