= The One You Love (Glenn Frey song) =

Single by Glenn Frey

from the album No Fun Aloud
- B-side: "All Those Lies"
- Released: July 1982
- Recorded: 1981
- Genre: Soft rock; easy listening
- Length: 4:35
- Label: Asylum
- Songwriters: Glenn Frey; Jack Tempchin
- Producers: Glenn Frey; Allan Blazek; Jim Ed Norman

Glenn Frey singles chronology
"I Found Somebody" (1982)	"The One You Love" (1982)	"Don't Give Up" (1982)

Official audio
- "The One You Love" on YouTube

"The One You Love" is a song by American musician and singer-songwriter Glenn Frey, most famous as singer and guitarist for the Eagles. It was released as the lead single from his debut solo album No Fun Aloud, in 1982. Ernie Watts and Jim Horn are featured on the tenor saxophone. Watts plays the repeating theme, while Horn plays the closing solo. The single features the track, "All Those Lies", as the B-side, which is also included in the album.

The song was also one of four of Frey's solo hits performed during the Eagles' 1994–1996 Hell Freezes Over tour, the others being "You Belong to the City", "Smuggler's Blues" and "The Heat is On", wherein bassist Timothy B. Schmit sings along with Frey. During performances of "The One You Love" on said tour, Al Garth played the saxophone parts while Don Henley did the drumming.

== Personnel ==
- Glenn Frey – vocals, guitar, bass, Fender Rhodes electric piano, Linn LM-1 programming
- Ernie Watts – tenor saxophone
- Jim Horn – tenor saxophone (outro solo)
- Jim Ed Norman – string arrangements

== Chart performance ==
"The One You Love" reached No. 15 on the Billboard Hot 100, No. 12 in Canada, No. 36 in New Zealand and No. 50 in Australia. It also peaked at No. 2 on the U.S. Adult Contemporary chart.

== Track listing ==
7" single
A. "The One You Love" – 4:35
B. "All Those Lies" – 4:42

== Charts ==
Chart (1982)	Peak position
Australian Singles (Kent Music Report)	50
Canada Top Singles (RPM)	12
Canada Adult Contemporary (RPM)	2
New Zealand (Recorded Music NZ)	36
US Billboard Hot 100	15
US Adult Contemporary (Billboard)	2
