= Soul Searchin' (Glenn Frey song) =

Single by Glenn Frey

from the album Soul Searchin'
- B-side: "It's Cold in Here"
- Released: January 1989
- Genre: Soft rock
- Length: 5:38
- Label: MCA - 53497
- Songwriter(s): Glenn Frey; Jack Tempchin; Duncan Cameron
- Producer(s): Elliot Scheiner; Glenn Frey

Glenn Frey singles chronology
"True Love" (1988)	"Soul Searchin'" (1989)	"Livin' Right" (1989)

"Soul Searchin'" is a song by American musician and singer-songwriter Glenn Frey, a member of the Eagles. It was released as a single from his third solo studio album of the same name in 1988. The single features the non-album track, "It's Cold in Here" as the B-side, which was also released as a bonus track on the CD reissue of the album.

Unlike the album, the single was a success peaking at No. 5 on the Adult Contemporary chart, but failed to peak on any other chart.

== Background ==
In the liner notes to the original album Glenn Frey wrote of the song "Here's the message, folks. You can't change the world but you can change yourself. Coach John Wooden said you shouldn't concern yourself with people's perception of you but rather concern yourself with your character which is the true measure of who and what you are. I buy that."

== Personnel ==
- Glenn Frey – lead vocals, keyboards, string arrangements
- Barry Beckett – keyboards
- Steve Nathan – keyboards
- Steve Thoma – keyboards
- Duncan Cameron – guitars, backing vocals
- David Hood – bass
- Roger Hawkins – drums
- Ralph MacDonald – percussion
- Nick DeCaro – string arrangements
- Oren Waters – backing vocals
- Institutional Radio Choir – choir
- Carl Williams – choir director

== Charts ==
Chart (1988)	Peak position
US Adult Contemporary (Billboard)	5
