= Lover's Moon =

Lover's Moon may refer to:

- "Lover's Moon", a song by Luscious Jackson from Electric Honey
- "Lover's Moon", a song by Glenn Frey from The Allnighter
