= Soul Searchin' (Glenn Frey album) =

Studio album by Glenn Frey
- Released: 15 August 1988
- Recorded: May 1986–May 1988
- Studios: Fool on the Hill (Los Angeles); Studio 55 (Los Angeles); Bill Schnee (Los Angeles); Ocean Way (Hollywood); Cherokee (Los Angeles); Capitol (Hollywood); Hit Factory (New York); Automated Sound (New York); Muscle Shoals (Muscle Shoals, Alabama); The Sandbox (Connecticut)
- Genres: Blue-eyed soul; pop rock; soft rock; funk
- Length: 46:24
- Label: MCA
- Producers: Glenn Frey; Elliot Scheiner

Glenn Frey chronology
The Allnighter (1984)	Soul Searchin' (1988)	Strange Weather (1992)

Professional ratings
Review scores
Source	Rating
AllMusic	link
The Rolling Stone Album Guide	1.5/5 stars

Soul Searchin' is the third solo studio album by Glenn Frey, the guitarist and co-lead vocalist for the Eagles. The album was released on August 15, 1988 on MCA in the United States and the United Kingdom, four years after Frey's successful album, The Allnighter and eight years after the demise of the Eagles. The album features eight original songs co-written by Frey with Jack Tempchin and the song "Two Hearts" contributed by Frey's friend, Hawk Wolinski. The album also features contributions from fellow Eagles member Timothy B. Schmit, Max Carl, Robbie Buchanan, Michael Landau, and Bruce Gaitsch.

The album was received negatively by the majority of music critics, while other reviewers noted good points to the album. It was also not as successful as Frey's previous albums (although one of his favorites), peaking at #36 on the Billboard 200, which marked the beginning of a downturn in Frey's fortunes on the album charts. The album's first and leading single, "True Love", unlike the album, was a commercial success, peaking at #13 on Billboard's Hot 100 and #2 on the Adult Contemporary chart, and so was the second single, the title track which peaked at #5 also on the same chart, while next single "Livin' Right" was #90 on Billboard's Hot 100.

== Background ==
Frey began work on the album in the midst of a string of hits in the 1980s, as well as animosity between him and other members of the Eagles. The album's title refers to his efforts to find his own identity.

== Musical direction ==
When Frey was asked about his musical direction, he said "In a sense I'm working my way back home, Though I left Detroit and went to California to cut my teeth on country-rock, I've remained obsessed with the music of my adolescence, the great soul hits of the 60's and early 70's. It's a style that most black musicians have abandoned for dance music and rap. There are a whole lot of people who miss the sound of Sam & Dave, and Wilson Pickett. It's left a gap that is being filled by people like Steve Winwood."

== Critical reception ==
Reviewing for AllMusic, critic William Ruhlmann wrote of the album "the songs here were so interchangeable with those on his first two albums he apologized for it in his note about "True Love," which became the album's sole Top 40 hit. The music was pleasant, but inconsequential, and suggested that Frey, living off his Eagles royalties, had come to think of his solo career as a hobby." In a review for The Rolling Stone Album Guide (1992), Mark Coleman gave the album one and a half out of five stars and wrote that "Frey sounded like he wasn't even trying anymore; his pump-your-body TV gym commercials at the time displayed more sweat and effort".

== Track listing ==
All songs by Glenn Frey and Jack Tempchin, except where noted.

No.	Title	Writer(s)	Length
1.	"Livin' Right"		5:07
2.	"Some Kind of Blue"		4:40
3.	"True Love"		4:40
4.	"Can't Put Out This Fire"		5:04
5.	"I Did It for Your Love"		4:00
6.	"Let's Pretend We're Still in Love"		4:51
7.	"Working Man"		3:25
8.	"Soul Searchin'"	Frey, Jack Tempchin, Duncan Cameron	5:38
9.	"Two Hearts"	David "Hawk" Wolinski, James Newton Howard	4:01
10.	"It's Your Life"	Frey, Steve Thoma	4:58
11.	"It's Cold In Here"	Frey, Duncan Cameron	3:48
12.	"Flip City"	Frey, Wolinski	5:12
Total length:			55:24

== Personnel ==
- Glenn Frey – lead vocals, backing vocals (1–4, 6–9), keyboards (1–5, 7–8), guitars (1–7, 9), bass guitar (1–7), percussion (1–2, 4), drums (2–3, 7)

Additional musicians

- David "Hawk" Wolinski – keyboards (1, 5, 7, 9)
- Ron Skies – keyboards (2, 4–5, 7, 10)
- Barry Beckett – keyboards (3, 8)
- Robbie Buchanan – keyboards (3, 9)
- Steve Thoma – keyboards (4, 7–8, 10)
- Steve Nathan – keyboards (8)
- Michael Landau – guitars (2, 6, 10)
- Duncan Cameron – guitars (8), backing vocals (8)
- Bruce Gaitsch – guitars (9)
- Paul Jackson Jr. – guitars (9)
- David Hood – bass guitar (8)
- Neil Stubenhaus – bass guitar (9)
- Dave Chamberlain – bass guitar (10)
- Russ Kunkel – drums (1, 5)
- John Robinson – drums (2, 4, 6, 9)
- Roger Hawkins – drums (8)
- Prairie Prince – drums (10)
- Steve Forman – percussion (1, 4–5, 7)
- Ralph MacDonald – percussion (3, 6, 8–10)
- Bill Bergman – saxophone solo (1)
- Al Garth – saxophone (2)
- Chris Mostert – saxophone (3, 10)
- The Heart Attack Horns – horns (1, 3–4, 7)
- Roy Galloway – backing vocals (2, 6, 8)
- Timothy B. Schmit – backing vocals (2, 6)
- Julia Tillman Waters – backing vocals (3–4, 8)
- Maxine Waters Willard – backing vocals (3–4, 8)
- Max Carl – backing vocals (7)
- Oren Waters – backing vocals (8)
- Institutional Radio Choir – backing vocals (8)
- Carl Williams – BGV direction (8)

Music arrangements

- Glenn Frey – arrangements (1), horn arrangements (3, 7), string arrangements (5, 8), French horn arrangements (5)
- Hawk Wolinski – arrangements (1)
- Greg Smith – horn arrangements (1, 3, 4, 7)
- Nick DeCaro – string arrangements (5, 8, 10), French horn arrangements (5)

== Production ==
- Glenn Frey – producer
- Elliot Scheiner – producer
- Hawk Wolinski – co-producer (1, 5, 9)
- James Newton Howard – co-producer (9)
- Ivy Skoff – production coordinator
- Jeff Adamoff – art direction
- ImageDesign – digital transfer
- DZN, The Design Group – design
- Dennis Keeley – photography
- The Fitzgerald Hartley Co. – management

Technical credits

- Ted Jensen – mastering at Sterling Sound (New York, NY)
- Rhonda Schoen – digital editing
- Ray Blair – engineer
- Dan Garcia – engineer
- Alec Head – engineer
- Glen Holguin – engineer
- Jack Joseph Puig – engineer
- Elliot Scheiner – engineer, mixing
- Ted Blaisdell – assistant engineer
- Jordan D'Alessio – assistant engineer
- Frank Dooken – assistant engineer
- Ken Felton – assistant engineer
- Mike Harlow – assistant engineer
- Robin Laine – assistant engineer
- Vickie Lancaster – assistant engineer
- Julie Last – assistant engineer
- Charlie Paakkari – assistant engineer
- Jim Singer – assistant engineer
- Paul Winger – assistant engineer

== Charts ==
Chart (1988)	Peak position
Australian Albums (Kent Music Report)	49
Canada Top Albums/CDs (RPM)	37
Finnish Albums (The Official Finnish Charts)	27
Swedish Albums (Sverigetopplistan)	36
US Billboard 200	36

== Certifications ==
Region	Certification	Certified units/sales
Canada (Music Canada)	Gold	50,000^{^}
^{^} Shipments figures based on certification alone.
