= Institutional Radio Choir =

U.S. gospel choir

The Institutional Radio Choir was a gospel choir that recorded between 1962 and 2003. The choir began in 1954 at the Institutional COGIC in Brooklyn, NY, under Bishop Carl E Williams Sr. After recording an album entitled: "Well Done," the choir backed up Shirley Caesar on her two albums, I'll Go and My Testimony. Caesar allotted the choir's director two songs on the album, one of which was entitled (When Trouble Comes) Stretch Out. The song went on to become a gospel standard, especially in Pentecostal circles. The choir went on to record over 20 albums, most of which charted in the Top 10 on the Gospel Billboard charts.

The choir was originally led by two brothers Alfred White and JC White, they were later joined by John Hason, a pianist for James Cleveland. After their departure in 1979, the choir was led by I. "Butch" Heyward and Carl Williams Jr. They dominated the radio both through airplay of their songs and a 10:30 PM church broadcast every Sunday night on WWRL. They were dubbed "The Hitmakers" by gospel radio DJ Joe Bostic and received numerous awards and recognition including a gold record for "Stretch Out," the Joe Bostic Award for "One More Day" and a Dove award nomination in the later years. In 1985, the choir participated in the hit Broadway classic The Gospel at Colonus along with Morgan Freeman, The Blind Boys of Alabama, The Soul Stirrers, J.J. Farley, The J.D. Steele Singers, Clarence Fountain, and Carl Lumbly.

== Influence on Modern Gospel and Popular Music ==
The choir’s music is often covered by other artists such as: “2 Chronicles (This is the Answer)”, “New Born Soul”, “One More Day”, “I Can’t Help But Serve the Lord”, and “Keys to the Kingdom”. These songs have been covered and sampled by modern secular artists, which helps to bridge the gap between gospel and secular music. Their music became a key source of inspiration for gospel-infused R&B and soul, which continues to shape contemporary gospel and secular charts alike. Their innovative vocal arrangements and spirited performances helped establish a foundation for contemporary gospel groups, particularly within the context of Black gospel music and contemporary Christian music.

The choir's music is often covered by other artists such as: "2 Chronicles (This is the Answer)", "New Born Soul", "One More Day", "I Can't Help But Serve the Lord", and "Keys to the Kingdom". They were known for their dynamic lead singers, spirited delivery, and upbeat "shout" songs. Their last album was recorded in 2003 and is entitled "Just Have Church." As of 2013, their music is available on iTunes.

== Discography ==
- Well Done (Faith, 1962)
- Stretch Out, later released as He Holdeth the Reins (1966, HOB)
- Gospel Blessed with Soul (1967, Atlantic)
- Grace (1968)
- This Is the Right Time (1970, King)
- One More Day (Zanzee, 1972)
- Glory to Glory (1974)
- Jubilee at Yale University (1975)
- Live: This Is the Answer or Top of the Mountain (Savoy, 1976)
- He's Standing By (1977)
- Say Something for the Lord (1978)
- 25th Anniversary: Believe (1979)
- New Life, New Love (1981)
- Come Out Here to Stay Lord (1982)
- Gospel at Colonus (1984)
- It's Praying Time (1985)
- Rhythm and Soul (with various artists)
- Soul Searchin' with Glenn Frey
- Reunion (1987)
- Feel Like Pressing My Way (1990)
- I Will Give You Praise (1996)
- Greatest Hits, Vol. 1 (2000)
- Just Have Church (2003)
