= Smuggler's Blues =

Single by Glenn Frey

from the album The Allnighter
- B-side: "New Love"
- Released: March 25, 1985
- Genre: Rock; blues rock; pop rock
- Length: 3:51 (single version) 4:20 (album version)
- Label: MCA
- Songwriters: Glenn Frey; Jack Tempchin
- Producers: Allan Blazek; Glenn Frey

Glenn Frey singles chronology
"The Heat Is On" (1984)	"Smuggler's Blues" (1985)	"You Belong to the City" (1985)

Music video
- "Smuggler's Blues" on YouTube

"Smuggler's Blues" is a song written by Glenn Frey and Jack Tempchin, and performed by Frey. It was the third and final single from Frey's second studio album, The Allnighter (1984). It followed "Sexy Girl" and "The Allnighter"; of the three, it charted highest. Its music video won Frey an MTV Video Music Award in 1985. The song was played with the Eagles on the Hell Freezes Over Tour with Timothy B. Schmit on bass guitar and harmonies, Don Henley on drums, Joe Walsh on rhythm guitar and Don Felder on rhythm and lead guitar.

The 16th episode of Miami Vice is named after the song, which was incorporated into the episode. Frey played an airplane pilot in the episode.

== Critical reception ==
Cashbox called the song "pure rock complete with slide guitar and a bluesy melody." Billboard described it as "blues-descended rock 'n' roll."

== Music video ==
The music video for "Smuggler's Blues" was directed by British film and music video director Duncan Gibbins. It won an MTV Video Music Award in 1985, and inspired an episode of Miami Vice, in which Frey guest-starred.

In the video, Frey plays a smuggler (his then-wife Janie plays the smuggler's female accomplice). The video is like a short movie, fitting the lyrics exactly and packs danger, suspense, and intrigue into a small segment of time.

It opens with Frey in a car with his friend and male accomplice (Gerry Del Sol), counting money. A drug deal is about to take place. Frey appears nervous, but his friend laughs off his concerns. As he goes in the building to complete the deal, Frey stays in the car. Suddenly, he hears a gunshot. His friend comes running, shouting that they must flee immediately—something has gone wrong. As Frey peels out, two men chase them, shooting. They strike and kill Frey's friend. Frey sees that his friend is dead and barely has time to react before he has to determine how to escape from the two men who are now chasing him in a car.

Knowing he has to lose them somehow, Frey pulls the car over once he is out of their sights, grabs a suitcase full of money, and runs. He escapes by going to a roof as his pursuers look for him on ground level. He returns safely to his hotel, but there is not much time before they locate him. As he is talking to his female accomplice in his hotel room, one of his pursuers arrives in the lobby. Oblivious, Frey is giving out instructions: "Here's a little money now, do it just the way we planned..." After she leaves, he takes a moment to grieve—"I'm sorry it went down like this, but someone had to lose"—before readying to leave.

Frey hurries to the hotel's elevator bank and presses the button to go down. In the lobby, the one pursuer has pressed the button to go up. He enters the elevator, then the video cuts back to Frey, waiting, back to the pursuer in the elevator cocking his gun, Frey again as the elevator door opens...leading the viewer to expect a confrontation, but nothing. After Frey enters the elevator and the doors close behind him, it is revealed that there is a second elevator, with its doors opening to reveal the pursuer, who has missed Frey by seconds.

Frey escapes to a gas station restroom, where he shaves and changes from his Hawaiian shirt and casual wear into a business suit. He slicks back his full, wavy hair and dons sunglasses. As he leaves, he throws away the clothes, looking like a different person. He boards a plane back to Miami, Florida.

Meanwhile, his accomplice is going through customs seemingly without any problems. Unfortunately, after she drives back to her place, the police arrest her. She apparently rats out Frey, because in the next scene, the police come to his home and take him in for questioning.

The lyrics match the onscreen behavior, as it appears Frey really is answering questions—"They move it through Miami, sell it in LA..." The interrogation scenes of him and the woman are interwoven, and it is seen that time is passing as Frey goes from being in his suit and tie, to no suit jacket, no tie, and a partially unbuttoned shirt. Finally, he is barely able to sit up straight, his hair is a mess, and he appears exhausted. However, police do not have enough evidence to hold him after a search fails to reveal anything.

Nearly three weeks after the initial encounter, now thinking he is home-free, Frey drives down the highway but is pulled over by what appears to be a motorcycle policeman. Frey reaches for his driver's license, but when he turns to the "policeman" to show it to him, he is staring into the laughing face of the pursuer whom he had previously evaded... and down the barrel of his drawn gun. The scene then fades to a presumably dead Frey, slumped over the side of the car, with the car radio blaring a news announcement stating, "Here are the top news stories this hour. Dade County Police are investigating the mystery shooting of a Miami businessman. At the moment, there appears to be no motive for the slaying..." as the video ends.

== Track listing ==
All tracks are written by Glenn Frey and Jack Tempchin.

7" single
No.	Title	Length
1.	"Smuggler's Blues"	3:51
2.	"New Love"	4:25
Total length:		8:10

== Personnel ==
- Glenn Frey – lead vocals, synthesizers, electric guitar, slide guitar
- Duncan Cameron – electric guitar, harmony vocals
- Josh Leo – electric guitar
- Bryan Garofalo – bass
- Michael Huey – drums
- Steve Forman – congas

== Charts ==
Chart (1984–1985)	Peak position
Australian Singles (Kent Music Report)	76
Canada Top Singles (RPM)	37
Ireland (IRMA)	6
UK Singles (Official Charts)	22
US Billboard Hot 100	12
US Mainstream Rock (Billboard)	13

== See also ==
- List of Miami Vice episodes
