= History of the Eagles – Live in Concert =

2013–15 concert tour by the Eagles

- Tour by the Eagles
- Start date: July 6, 2013
- End date: July 29, 2015
- Legs: 5
- No. of shows: 109 in North America; 20 in Europe; 14 in Oceania; 142 total

the Eagles concert chronology
- Long Road Out of Eden Tour (2008–11); History of the Eagles – Live in Concert (2013–15); An Evening with the Eagles (2017–19)

History of the Eagles – Live in Concert was a concert tour by the American rock band the Eagles. It was launched in conjunction with the release of the 2013 documentary History of the Eagles. The tour visited North America and Europe between 2013 and 2014 as well as Oceania in early 2015. It began in Louisville, Kentucky, at the KFC Yum! Center and concluded on July 29, 2015, in Bossier City, Louisiana. The tour included Bernie Leadon, who was in the band's original lineup, and would have also included Randy Meisner, but he was too ill to perform at the time. Don Felder was excluded because of ongoing lawsuits against the group, despite settling them in 2007. It was the last tour to involve Glenn Frey before his death in 2016.

== Critical reception ==
Howard Cohen from Miami.com praised the performance in Miami, noting the "harmonies – pristine, soaring and spot-on —uncannily have remained as peerless as they were on the original recordings". Jim Harrington from San Jose Mercury News gave a mixed review of the performance in San Jose, writing that the show "was a very educational, and sometimes interesting, affair – but I'm not sure I'd want to take the course again". Francis Pelliccario from The Lantern gave a positive review of the show in Columbus, writing the band "brought the show back down to earth with the true meaning of rock 'n’ roll".

== Set list ==
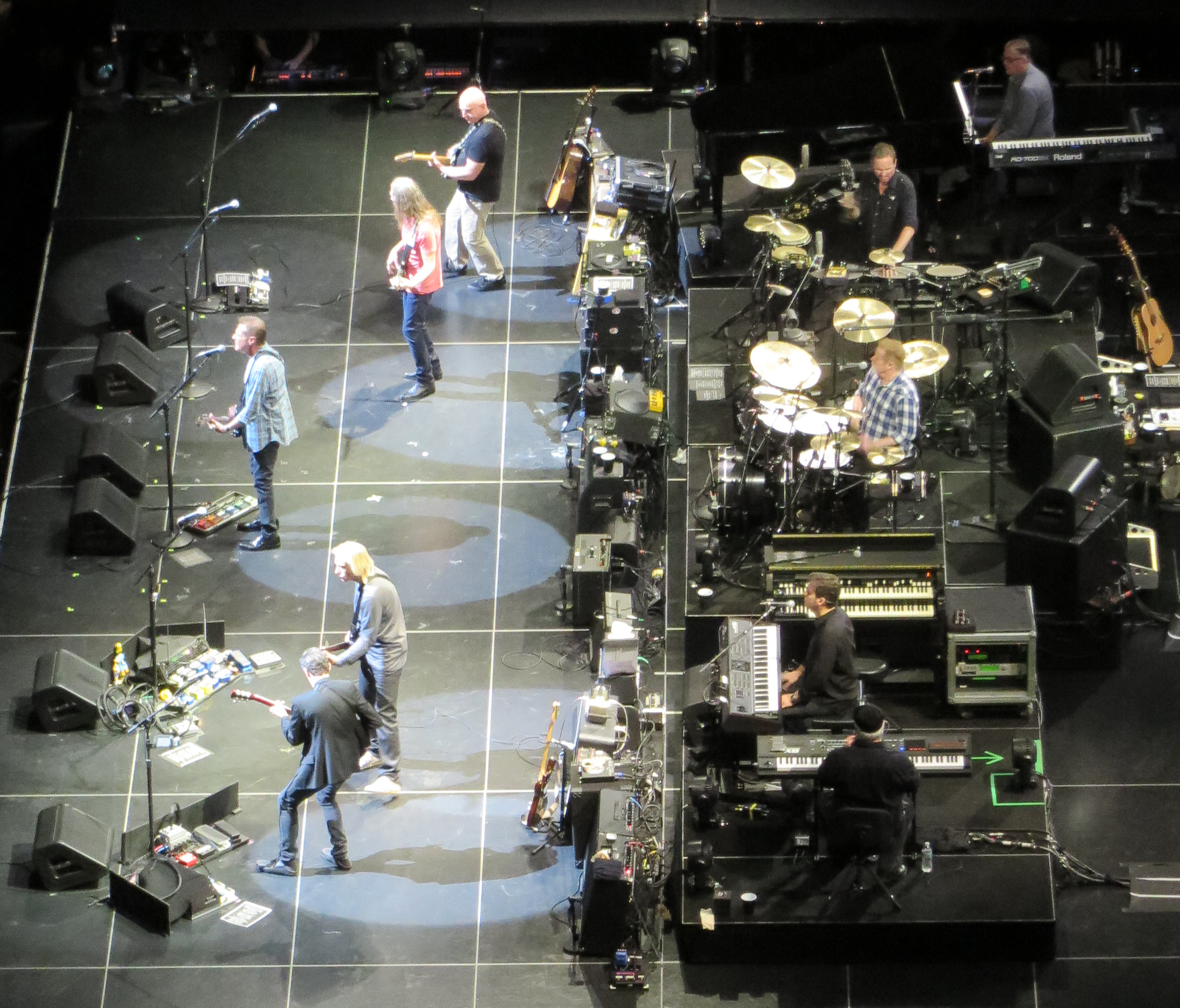
The Eagles at the Amway Center (Orlando, Florida) on November 23, 2013

This setlist is the average setlist as calculated by setlist.fm. The vast majority of shows on this tour follow this setlist exactly, although there are some slight variations. "How Long" was played at six shows, "Dirty Laundry" was played at five shows, and "Seven Bridges Road" was played once. "How Long" and "Dirty Laundry" were played at unrelated shows with very different setlists that took place at the same time as the tour.

1. "Saturday Night"
2. "Train Leaves Here This Morning"
3. "Peaceful Easy Feeling"
4. "Witchy Woman"
5. "Doolin–Dalton"
6. "Tequila Sunrise"
7. "Doolin-Dalton/Desperado (Reprise)"
8. "Already Gone"
9. "Best of My Love"
10. "Lyin' Eyes"
11. "One of These Nights"
12. "Take It to the Limit"
13. "Pretty Maids All in a Row"
14. "I Can't Tell You Why"
15. "New Kid in Town"
16. "Love Will Keep Us Alive"
17. "Heartache Tonight"
18. "Those Shoes"
19. "In the City"
20. "Life's Been Good"
21. "The Long Run"
22. "Funk #49"
23. "Life in the Fast Lane"

Encore

24. "Hotel California"

Encore 2

25. "Take It Easy"
26. "Rocky Mountain Way"
27. "Desperado"

== Tour dates ==
List of concerts, showing date, city, country, venue, tickets sold, number of available tickets and amount of gross revenue
| Date | City | Country | Venue | Attendance | Revenue |
North America
| July 6, 2013 | Louisville | United States | KFC Yum! Center | — | — |
| July 7, 2013 (Note: The concert of July 7, 2013 in Milwaukee, Wisconsin at the Marcus Amphitheater was a part of 2013 "Summerfest.") | Milwaukee | United States | Marcus Amphitheater | — | — |
| July 9, 2013 | Cleveland | United States | Quicken Loans Arena | — | — |
| July 11, 2013 | Toronto | Canada | Air Canada Centre | 29,174 / 29,174 | $4,032,890 |
| July 13, 2013 (Note: The concert of July 13, 2013 in Grand Falls at the Centennial Park was a part of "Salmon Festival.") | Grand Falls | Canada | Centennial Park | — | – |
| July 15, 2013 | Ottawa | Canada | Canadian Tire Centre | — | — |
| July 16, 2013 | Philadelphia | United States | Wells Fargo Center | 14,980 / 14,980 | $1,763,964 |
| July 18, 2013 | Uncasville | United States | Mohegan Sun Arena | 5,684 / 5,684 | $978,980 |
| July 19, 2013 | Mansfield | United States | Comcast Center | — | — |
| July 22, 2013 | Washington, D.C. | United States | Verizon Center | 13,619 / 13,619 | $1,889,467 |
| July 23, 2013 | Pittsburgh | United States | Consol Energy Center | — | – |
| July 25, 2013 | Bethel | United States | Bethel Woods Center for the Arts | — | — |
| September 4, 2013 | Seattle | United States | KeyArena | — | — |
| September 6, 2013 | Vancouver | Canada | Rogers Arena | — | — |
| September 7, 2013 | Vancouver | Canada | Rogers Arena | — | — |
| September 9, 2013 | Edmonton | Canada | Rexall Place | — | — |
| September 11, 2013 | Calgary | Canada | Scotiabank Saddledome | — | — |
| September 12, 2013 | Calgary | Canada | Scotiabank Saddledome | — | — |
| September 14, 2013 | Saskatoon | Canada | Credit Union Centre | — | — |
| September 16, 2013 | Winnipeg | Canada | MTS Centre | — | — |
| September 18, 2013 | Minneapolis | United States | Target Center | — | — |
| September 20, 2013 | Chicago | United States | United Center | — | — |
| September 21, 2013 | Auburn Hills | United States | The Palace of Auburn Hills | — | — |
| October 4, 2013 | Lincoln | United States | Pinnacle Bank Arena | — | — |
| October 5, 2013 | Denver | United States | Pepsi Center | — | — |
| October 7, 2013 | Wichita | United States | Intrust Bank Arena | — | — |
| October 9, 2013 | Tulsa | United States | BOK Center | 12,282 / 12,282 | $1,564,745 |
| October 11, 2013 | Dallas | United States | American Airlines Center | — | — |
| October 12, 2013 | Dallas | United States | American Airlines Center | — | — |
| October 14, 2013 | Memphis | United States | FedExForum | — | — |
| October 16, 2013 | Nashville | United States | Bridgestone Arena | 13,679 / 13,679 | $1,915,911 |
| October 18, 2013 | Indianapolis | United States | Bankers Life Fieldhouse | — | — |
| October 19, 2013 | Rosemont | United States | Allstate Arena | — | — |
| October 21, 2013 | Moline | United States | iWireless Center | — | — |
| October 23, 2013 | Kansas City | United States | Sprint Center | — | — |
| October 24, 2013 | St. Louis | United States | Scottrade Center | — | — |
| November 4, 2013 | Montreal | Canada | Bell Centre | 12,782 / 12,782 | $1,674,900 |
| November 6, 2013 | Toronto | Canada | Air Canada Centre | (Note: The score data is representative of the two shows at the Air Canada Centre on July 11 and November 6 respectively.) | |
| November 8, 2013 | New York City | United States | Madison Square Garden | — | — |
| November 9, 2013 | New York City | United States | Madison Square Garden | — | — |
| November 11, 2013 | New York City | United States | Madison Square Garden | — | — |
| November 13, 2013 | Knoxville | United States | Thompson–Boling Arena | — | — |
| November 15, 2013 | Charlotte | United States | Time Warner Cable Arena | — | — |
| November 16, 2013 | Greensboro | United States | Greensboro Coliseum | — | — |
| November 18, 2013 | Birmingham | United States | BJCC Arena | — | — |
| November 20, 2013 | Tampa | United States | Tampa Bay Times Forum | — | — |
| November 22, 2013 | Miami | United States | American Airlines Arena | — | — |
| November 23, 2013 | Orlando | United States | Amway Center | 13,798 / 13,880 | $1,681,017 |
| January 15, 2014 | Inglewood | United States | The Forum | — | — |
| January 17, 2014 | Inglewood | United States | The Forum | — | — |
| January 18, 2014 | Inglewood | United States | The Forum | — | — |
| January 22, 2014 | Inglewood | United States | The Forum | — | — |
| January 24, 2014 | Inglewood | United States | The Forum | — | — |
| January 25, 2014 | Inglewood | United States | The Forum | — | — |
| January 28, 2014 | Sacramento | United States | Sleep Train Arena | — | — |
| January 29, 2014 | San Jose | United States | SAP Center | — | — |
| January 31, 2014 | San Jose | United States | SAP Center | — | — |
| February 15, 2014 | Las Vegas | United States | MGM Grand Garden Arena | — | — |
| February 16, 2014 | Las Vegas | United States | MGM Grand Garden Arena | — | — |
| February 19, 2014 | Dallas | United States | American Airlines Center | 14,467 / 14,467 | $1,886,208 |
| February 21, 2014 | Houston | United States | Toyota Center | — | — |
| February 23, 2014 | New Orleans | United States | New Orleans Arena | — | — |
| February 24, 2014 | Atlanta | United States | Philips Arena | 13,625 / 13,625 | $1,698,448 |
| February 26, 2014 | Jacksonville | United States | Jacksonville Veterans Memorial Arena | — | — |
| February 28, 2014 | Raleigh | United States | PNC Arena | — | — |
| March 1, 2014 | Washington, D.C. | United States | Verizon Center | 13,758 / 13,758 | $2,007,189 |
| March 3, 2014 | Cincinnati | United States | U.S. Bank Arena | — | — |
| March 5, 2014 | Columbus | United States | Nationwide Arena | — | — |
Europe
| May 22, 2014 | Amsterdam | Netherlands | Ziggo Dome | — | — |
| May 23, 2014 | Amsterdam | Netherlands | Ziggo Dome | — | — |
| May 25, 2014 | Antwerp | Belgium | Sportpaleis | — | — |
| May 28, 2014 | Birmingham | England | LG Arena | — | — |
| May 29, 2014 | Birmingham | England | LG Arena | — | — |
| May 31, 2014 | Glasgow | Scotland | SSE Hydro | — | — |
| June 2, 2014 | Glasgow | Scotland | SSE Hydro | — | — |
| June 4, 2014 | Dublin | Ireland | The O_{2} | — | — |
| June 6, 2014 | Dublin | Ireland | The O_{2} | — | — |
| June 7, 2014 | Dublin | Ireland | The O_{2} | — | — |
| June 16, 2014 | London | England | The O_{2} Arena | — | — |
| June 18, 2014 | London | England | The O_{2} Arena | — | — |
| June 20, 2014 | London | England | The O_{2} Arena | — | — |
| June 21, 2014 | London | England | The O_{2} Arena | — | — |
| June 23, 2014 | Leeds | England | First Direct Arena | — | — |
| June 25, 2014 | Manchester | England | Manchester Arena | — | — |
| June 26, 2014 | Liverpool | England | Echo Arena | — | — |
| June 28, 2014 | Vechta | Germany | Stoppelmarkt | — | — |
| June 30, 2014 | Zürich | Switzerland | Hallenstadion | — | — |
| July 2, 2014 (Note: The concert of July 2, 2014 in Lucca, Italy at the Piazza Napoleone is a part of "Lucca Summer Festival 2014") | Lucca | Italy | Piazza Napoleone | — | — |
North America
| August 25, 2014 | Tacoma | United States | Tacoma Dome | — | — |
| August 27, 2014 | Portland | United States | Moda Center | — | — |
| August 29, 2014 | Stateline | United States | Harveys Outdoor Arena | — | — |
| August 30, 2014 | Stateline | United States | Harveys Outdoor Arena | — | — |
| September 2, 2014 | Salt Lake City | United States | EnergySolutions Arena | — | — |
| September 5, 2014 | Omaha | United States | CenturyLink Center Omaha | — | — |
| September 6, 2014 | Des Moines | United States | Wells Fargo Arena | — | — |
| September 8, 2014 | Grand Rapids | United States | Van Andel Arena | — | — |
| September 10, 2014 | Newark | United States | Prudential Center | — | — |
| September 12, 2014 | Allentown | United States | PPL Center | — | — |
| September 13, 2014 | New York City | United States | Madison Square Garden | — | — |
| September 15, 2014 | Boston | United States | TD Garden | — | — |
| September 16, 2014 | Boston | United States | Wang Theatre | — | — |
| September 18, 2014 | New York City | United States | Madison Square Garden | — | — |
| October 1, 2014 | Glendale | United States | Gila River Arena | — | — |
| October 3, 2014 | Anaheim | United States | Honda Center | — | — |
| October 4, 2014 | San Diego | United States | Viejas Arena | — | — |
| October 9, 2014 | Fresno | United States | Save Mart Center | — | — |
| October 11, 2014 | Las Vegas | United States | MGM Grand Garden Arena | — | — |
| October 15, 2014 | San Antonio | United States | AT&T Center | — | — |
Oceania
| February 18, 2015 | Perth | Australia | Perth Arena | 25,749 / 25,749 | $4,653,340 |
| February 19, 2015 | Perth | Australia | Perth Arena | 25,749 / 25,749 | $4,653,340 |
| February 22, 2015 | Melbourne | Australia | Rod Laver Arena | 35,065 / 35,927 | $5,473,040 |
| February 24, 2015 | Melbourne | Australia | Rod Laver Arena | 35,065 / 35,927 | $5,473,040 |
| February 26, 2015 | Melbourne | Australia | Rod Laver Arena | 35,065 / 35,927 | $5,473,040 |
| February 28, 2015 | Macedon | Australia | Hanging Rock | — | — |
| March 2, 2015 | Sydney | Australia | Qantas Credit Union Arena | 10,424 / 10,424 | $1,992,960 |
| March 4, 2015 | Sydney | Australia | Allphones Arena | 21,606 / 21,606 | $3,530,810 |
| March 6, 2015 | Sydney | Australia | Allphones Arena | 21,606 / 21,606 | $3,530,810 |
| March 7, 2015 | Hunter Valley | Australia | Hope Estate | — | — |
| March 10, 2015 | Brisbane | Australia | Brisbane Entertainment Centre | 20,142 / 20,142 | $3,858,030 |
| March 11, 2015 | Brisbane | Australia | Brisbane Entertainment Centre | 20,142 / 20,142 | $3,858,030 |
| March 14, 2015 | Auckland | New Zealand | Mount Smart Stadium | — | — |
| March 15, 2015 | Auckland | New Zealand | Mount Smart Stadium | — | — |
North America
| May 19, 2015 | Austin | United States | Frank Erwin Center | — | — |
| May 20, 2015 | Oklahoma City | United States | Chesapeake Energy Arena | — | — |
| May 22, 2015 | El Paso | United States | Don Haskins Center | — | — |
| May 24, 2015 | Las Vegas | United States | MGM Grand Garden Arena | — | — |
| May 26, 2015 | Bakersfield | United States | Rabobank Arena | — | — |
| May 28, 2015 | Eugene | United States | Matthew Knight Arena | — | — |
| May 29, 2015 | Spokane | United States | Spokane Veterans Memorial Arena | — | — |
| May 31, 2015 | Boise | United States | Taco Bell Arena | — | — |
| June 2, 2015 | Billings | United States | Rimrock Auto Arena at MetraPark | — | — |
| June 4, 2015 | Sioux Falls | United States | Denny Sanford Premier Center | — | — |
| June 5, 2015 | Grand Forks | United States | Alerus Center | — | — |
| June 7, 2015 | Green Bay | United States | Resch Center | — | — |
| July 10, 2015 | Miami | United States | American Airlines Arena | — | — |
| July 12, 2015 | Greenville | United States | Bon Secours Wellness Arena | — | — |
| July 13, 2015 | Charlottesville | United States | John Paul Jones Arena | — | — |
| July 15, 2015 | Hartford | United States | XL Center | — | — |
| July 17, 2015 | Atlantic City | United States | Boardwalk Hall | — | — |
| July 18, 2015 | Buffalo | United States | First Niagara Center | — | — |
| July 20, 2015 | Baltimore | United States | Royal Farms Arena | — | — |
| July 22, 2015 | Dayton | United States | Nutter Center | — | — |
| July 24, 2015 | Detroit | United States | Joe Louis Arena | — | — |
| July 25, 2015 | Lexington | United States | Rupp Arena | — | — |
| July 27, 2015 | North Little Rock | United States | Verizon Arena | — | — |
| July 29, 2015 | Bossier City | United States | CenturyLink Center | — | — |
| July 31, 2015 | St. Louis | United States | Christian Brothers College High School | — | — |
| Total | | | | 235,769 / 235,851 (99%) | $34,855,859 |

== Band members ==
=== Eagles ===
- Glenn Frey – vocals, guitar, keyboards
- Don Henley – vocals, drums, guitar, percussion
- Joe Walsh – vocals, guitar, keyboards
- Timothy B. Schmit – bass guitar, vocals, harmonica
- Bernie Leadon – guitar, banjo, vocals

=== Additional musicians ===
- Scott Crago – drums, percussion
- Will Hollis – keyboards, percussion, vocals
- Steuart Smith – guitar, vocals, mandolin
- Michael Thompson – keyboards, vocals
- Richard F.W. Davis – keyboards, percussion, vocals

== Controversy ==
In January 2024, Kellye Croft, who was employed as a massage therapist for the Eagles in 2013, alleged in a lawsuit that James Dolan sexually assaulted her when he toured with the Eagles during the 2013 portion of the History of the Eagles: Live In Concert tour. Dolan's band JD & the Straight Shot opened for Eagles concerts during the tour. Dolan, a prominent businessman who also has served as the lead MSG executive, was believed to have financed the tour with a large sum of his money as well.
