= The Heat Is On (Glenn Frey song) =

1984 single by Glenn Frey

Single by Glenn Frey

from the album Beverly Hills Cop: Original Motion Picture Soundtrack
- B-side: "Shoot Out" by Harold Faltermeyer
- Released: November 1984
- Genre: Hard rock; pop rock
- Length: 3:45 (7-inch and album); 5:51 (12-inch)
- Label: MCA
- Songwriters: Harold Faltermeyer; Keith Forsey
- Producers: Harold Faltermeyer; Keith Forsey

Glenn Frey singles chronology
"Sexy Girl" (1984)	"The Heat Is On" (1984)	"Smuggler's Blues" (1984)

Official video
- "The Heat Is On" (From Beverly Hills Cop Soundtrack) on YouTube

"The Heat Is On" is a song written by Harold Faltermeyer and Keith Forsey, and recorded by Glenn Frey for the American film Beverly Hills Cop (1984). The song was released as a single and as the sixth track of the album Beverly Hills Cop: Original Motion Picture Soundtrack (1984).

== History ==
According to Frey, he was invited to an early screening of the film, and about two months later was sent a demo of a song written by Keith Forsey and Harold Faltermeyer to be used in the film to see if he was interested in singing the song. Frey agreed, and recorded the vocal part in one day. The following day he played the guitar and recorded the backing vocals, and was paid $15,000 for the work.

The mid-to-up-tempo recording featured a steady drumbeat, synthesizer, and guitar, with a repeated saxophone riff framing the lyrical message. The guitar solo is played by Frey himself.

The song became a major hit single, reaching No. 2 on the U.S. Billboard Hot 100 chart in March 1985, behind "Can't Fight This Feeling" by REO Speedwagon. It was also popular internationally, reaching No. 2 on the Australian Singles Chart in 1985 and gaining peaks of No. 8 on the Canadian Singles Chart and No. 12 on the UK singles chart. In the United States, it is the highest charting solo single by any member of the Eagles.

The recording subsequently appeared on Frey's albums Glenn Frey Live (1993) and Solo Collection (1995) as well as on some various-artists "top hits" collections.

== Music video ==
The music video for the song received heavy MTV airplay. It showed a film editor assembling scenes for Beverly Hills Cop while Frey and a band played the song in the adjacent room, with action scenes from the movie then directly interspersed. Among the musicians shown in the video is saxophone player Beverly Dahlke-Smith (the actual recording being made by session horn player David Woodford) and Frey's long-time drummer, Michael Huey.

== Critical reception ==
Cashbox called it "a hard rocking outing featuring the distinctive vocals of ex-Eagle Frey" and added that it contains "a signature horn riff and some effective dynamics." Billboard said it "features a bustling rock 'n' roll beat, electric organ (or equivalent) and a wailing sax."

== Track listing ==
7" single
No.	Title	Writer(s)	Length
1.	"The Heat Is On"	Keith Forsey; Harold Faltermeyer	3:45
2.	"Shoot Out"	Harold Faltermeyer	2:44
Total length:			6:29

12" single
No.	Title	Remixer	Length
1.	"The Heat Is On (extended version)"		6:04
2.	"The Heat Is On (dance version)"	Brian Reeves	5:40
3.	"The Heat Is On (dub version)"	Brian Reeves	2:39
Total length:			14:23

== Personnel ==
- Glenn Frey – lead and backing vocals, guitar solo
- Harold Faltermeyer – keyboards, bass
- Richie Zito – guitars
- Keith Forsey – drums, backing vocals
- David Woodford – saxophone

== Charts ==
=== Weekly charts ===
Chart (1984–1985)	Peak position
Australia (Kent Music Report)	2
Austria (Ö3 Austria Top 40)	27
Belgium (Ultratop 50 Flanders)	27
Canada Top Singles (RPM)	8
Finland (Suomen virallinen lista)	13
Ireland (IRMA)	6
Netherlands (Single Top 100)	19
New Zealand (Recorded Music NZ)	22
Norway (VG-lista)	2
Panama (UPI)	1
Sweden (Sverigetopplistan)	5
Switzerland (Schweizer Hitparade)	5
UK Singles (Official Charts)	12
US Billboard Hot 100	2
US Mainstream Rock (Billboard)	4
US Adult Contemporary (Billboard)	36
US Dance Singles Sales (Billboard)	35
West Germany (GfK)	4

=== Year-end charts ===
Chart (1985)	Peak position
Australian Singles (Kent Music Report)	22
Canada Top Singles (RPM)	65
US Billboard Hot 100	19

== Certifications ==
Region	Certification	Certified units/sales
Canada (Music Canada)	Gold	50,000^{^}
New Zealand (RMNZ)	Gold	15,000^{‡}
^{^} Shipments figures based on certification alone.^{‡} Sales+streaming figures based on certification alone.
