= Michael Huey (musician) =

American drummer (born 1950)

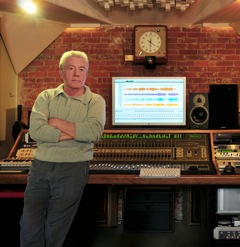

Background information
- Born: October 24, 1950 (age 76); Bowdon, Georgia, U.S.
- Genres: Rock; pop; R&B; country; film and television
- Occupations: Musician; producer
- Instruments: Drums; percussion
- Years active: 1969–2010
- Website: hueytunes.com

J. Michael Huey (born October 24, 1950) is an American drummer and producer. He has played on 18 gold and platinum albums with a diverse group of artists in genres including rock, pop, country, and R&B, including Glenn Frey, Joe Walsh, Juice Newton, Etta James, and Lindsey Buckingham. Huey is noted for his work on film and television soundtracks as well as numerous world tours with Rock & Roll Hall of Fame inductees. He has also worked as a record producer for major record labels, including MCA and Warner Bros.

== Early career ==
Michael Huey started playing the drums while in high school playing in regional bands in Georgia, most notably the Kenningtons and 8-Up With Soul, who performed at local dance clubs and small venues. In 1969, Atlanta music manager Johnny Bee encouraged Huey to audition for the pop singer Tommy Roe, whose song "Dizzy" had become a worldwide hit that year. The audition was a success and Roe, who was signed to the Bill Lowery Organization, hired Huey to play drums on his national 'Dizzy' tour.

== Atlanta years ==
After the "Dizzy" tour ended, Huey returned to playing smaller venues. Saxophone player Grainger "Brother" Hines of The Swingin' Medallions ("Double Shot of My Baby's Love") was in an Atlanta bar where Huey was performing, and invited him to play drums for the Swingin' Medallions; Huey accepted, and replaced Ron Nobles. The Swingin' Medallions were also represented by Bill Lowery.

In 1970, Huey played drums on tracks on the album Color Him Father by the Winstons. In 1971, he became the drummer for the Classics IV, and during this period was also hired as staff drummer for the Lowery Group. Huey's earlier work for the Winstons led to his involvement with the Allen Toussaint-produced 1974 album Frankie Miller's Highlife by Frankie Miller. As the staff drummer for Lowery Studios, Huey played drums on numerous sessions, most notably for Johnny Nash, Billy Joe Royal, The Tams, Joe South, Clarence Carter, Mylon LeFevre, Sam Moore (Sam & Dave) and Sami Jo.

== Los Angeles years ==
In 1976, Huey moved to Los Angeles, where he played drums on recording sessions as well as world tours for Walter Egan (including the hit single "Magnet and Steel"), Michael Martin Murphey, Johnny Lee, Chris Hillman and Gene Clark of the Byrds, Joanne Mackell, the Osmonds, Blue Steel, Rob Grill of the Grass Roots, Lindsey Buckingham of Fleetwood Mac, Juice Newton, and many other artists.

In 1981, producer and arranger Jim Ed Norman hired Huey to play drums on Glenn Frey's (The Eagles) first solo album, No Fun Aloud, which produced the Top 10 hits "Party Town" and "I Found Somebody". Huey worked with Frey for the next twelve years, providing the drums on all of his solo records, including the hits "Smuggler's Blues" and "You Belong to the City" on the album The Allnighter. Both tracks were featured on the NBC television series Miami Vice, as well as appearing on the Miami Vice soundtrack album, which stayed at #1 on the Billboard charts for eleven weeks in 1985. The soundtrack sold over five million copies and won two Grammy Awards, making it the most successful TV soundtrack album of all time.

Huey also played on the feature films Beverly Hills Cop, Back to the Future, Boogie Nights, Deuce Bigalow, Sgt. Bilko and Overnight Delivery.

He appeared in concert with Joe Walsh, Etta James, and Albert Collins as part of the Jazzvisions series of concerts filmed at the Wiltern Theater, Los Angeles in December 1986, which was subsequently released on video and CD under the title Jump The Blues Away.

== Hall of Fame ==
- Rock & Roll Hall of Fame (records & tours): Glenn Frey (The Eagles), Joe Walsh (Eagles), Lindsey Buckingham (Fleetwood Mac), Etta James, Albert Collins, Chris Hillman (Byrds), Gene Clark (Byrds), Allen Toussaint (producer/songwriter), Sam Moore (Sam & Dave)
- Georgia Music Hall of Fame (records & tours): Tommy Roe, Joe South, The Tams, The Classics IV, Clarence Carter, Billy Joe Royal, Ray Whitley, Mylon LaFevre, Bill Lowery, Paul Cochran

== Music producer and arranger ==
Huey produced, arranged, and played drums on the critically acclaimed album So Rebellious A Lover (1987) for Gene Clark (The Byrds) and Carla Olson (The Textones). Huey also produced the remastered collectors' edition CD released in 2009.

In 1985, Huey was hired to produce and arrange the music for two of the Miller Genuine Draft NBA Semi-Finals and Championship Series (Lakers v Celtics) CBS national TV / radio advertising campaigns.

In 1990, he co-produced The Best of Tommy Roe: Yesterday, Today, & Tomorrow, which was released on the Curb Mod Afw label.

Huey has worked as a producer and arranger for the following companies:

- MCA/Universal Records
- Capitol Records
- Curb Records
- Warner Brothers Records
- Rhino Records
- Fuel Records
- Miller Corporation
- Razor and Tie Records
- Rockin' House Entertainment

== Post-retirement ==
In 1992, Huey retired from his career as a musician and attended UCLA School of Law.

In 1994, he started his own music publishing and production company called HueyTunes.

== Recordings (partial list) ==
Year	Album	Artist	Credit
1970	The Winstons	The Winstons	Drums
1974	Frankie Miller's High Life	Frankie Miller	Drums
1974	High Life (bonus tracks)	Frankie Miller	Drums
1974	It Could Have Been Me	Sami Jo	Drums
1974	Third Annual Pipe Dream	Atlanta Rhythm Section	Percussion
1975	Loneliness and Temptation	Clarence Carter	Percussion
1975	A Heart Full of Song	Clarence Carter	Percussion
1975	Love Trip	Tamiko Jones	Drums
1975	Midnight Rainbows	Joe South	Drums
1975	Pat Terry Group	Pat Terry	Drums, percussion
1975	The Very Best of Classics IV	Classics IV	Drums
1977	All I Want to Do	Lee Conway	Drums
1977	Live At The Bottom Line NYC	Chris Hillman	Drums
1977	Plain and Fancy	The Bellamy Brothers	Drums
1977	What a Wonderful World	Johnny Nash	Drums
1978	Joanne Mackell	Joanne Mackell	Drums
1978	Magnet & Steel	Walter Egan	Drums, percussion
1978	Not Shy	Walter Egan	Drums, percussion
1979	Hi-Fi	Walter Egan	Drums, percussion
1979	No More Lonely Nights	Blue Steel	Drums
1979	Uprooted	Rob Grill	Drums
1980	Best of the Pat Terry Group	Pat Terry	Drums
1980	Last Stroll	Walter Egan	Drums, percussion
1981	Nothing But Time	Blue Steel	Drums
1982	The Heart Never Lies	Michael Martin Murphey	Drums
1982	No Fun Aloud	Glenn Frey	Drums
1982	Sounds Like Love	Johnny Lee	Drums
1983	Best of Michael Martin Murphey	Michael Martin Murphey	Drums
1983	Wild Exhibitions	Walter Egan	Drums, percussion
1984	One Way Rider	The Osmonds	Drums
1984	The Allnighter	Glenn Frey	Drums
1985	Miami Vice (Smuggler's Blues)	Glenn Frey	Drums
1985	Rock Breakout Years	Glenn Frey	Drums
1985	Back to the Future (film/soundtrack)	Lindsey Buckingham	Drums
1985	Today	The Osmonds	Drums
1986	Overnight Delivery (film/soundtrack)	Original Soundtrack	Drums
1986	Miami Vice (You Belong to the City)	Glenn Frey	Drums
1987	Lonely Town	Tom Kell	Drums
1987	So Rebellious a Lover	Gene Clark/Carla Olson	Producer, drums, percussion
1988	Sergeant Bilko (film/soundtrack)	Original Soundtrack	Drums
1989	Jump the Blues Away	Etta James	Drums
1989	Jump the Blues Away	Joe Walsh	Drums
1989	Jump the Blues Away	Albert Collins	Drums
1989	Deuce Bigalow (film/soundtrack)	Original Soundtrack	Drums
1990	Yesterday, Today, and Tomorrow (The Best of Tommy Roe)	Tommy Roe	Producer, drums, percussion
1995	Solo Collection	Glenn Frey	Drums
1995	Solo Collection (Japanese bonus track)	Glenn Frey	Drums
1995	Wave of the Hand	Carla Olson	Drums, Producer
1995	After the Love	Various Artists	Drums
1997	Boogie Nights (film/soundtrack)	Original Soundtrack	Drums
1998	Flying High	Gene Clark	Producer, drums, percussion
2000	Best of Glenn Frey	Glenn Frey	Drums
2000	So Rebellious a Lover (collectors' edition remastered)	Gene Clark/Carla Olson	Producer, drums, percussion
2001	Honest as Daylight: The Best of Carla Olson (1981–2000)	Carla Olson	Producer, drums, percussion
2005	Fundamental Roll/Not Shy	Walter Egan	Drums, percussion
2005	Third Annual Pipe Dream: A Rock and Roll Alternative	Atlanta Rhythm Section	Conga, percussion
2005	Hi-Fi/The Last Stroll	Walter Egan	Drums, percussion
2009	Best of Johnny Nash	Johnny Nash	Drums, percussion
2010	The Collection	Walter Egan	Drums, percussion
