= You Belong to the City =

Single by Glenn Frey

from the album Miami Vice soundtrack
- B-side: "Smuggler's Blues"
- Released: September 1985
- Genre: Pop; new wave
- Length: 4:22 (single version); 5:51 (album version)
- Label: MCA
- Songwriters: Glenn Frey; Jack Tempchin
- Producer: Glenn Frey

Glenn Frey singles chronology
"Smuggler's Blues" (1985)	"You Belong to the City" (1985)	"True Love" (1988)

Music video
- "You Belong to the City" on YouTube

"You Belong to the City" is a song written by Glenn Frey and Jack Tempchin, and recorded by Frey during his solo career. It was written specifically for the television show Miami Vice in 1985. The song peaked at number two on the US Billboard Hot 100 chart, although it did reach the top of the Billboard Top Rock Tracks chart.

The song, along with Jan Hammer's "Miami Vice Theme", helped the Miami Vice soundtrack album reach the top spot of the Billboard 200 chart. Frey performed this song live when touring with the Eagles until 2005. A version of the Eagles performing the song can be found on their DVD Farewell Tour I: Live from Melbourne released that year.

== History ==
The song was featured in, and written specifically for, the Miami Vice episode "Prodigal Son".

== Production ==
All instruments were performed by Frey except the saxophone part played by studio musician Bill Bergman, as well as the drum track by Frey's long-time drummer, Michael Huey. The song was recorded at Fool on the Hill studios, New York City, at the end of 1984. The synthesizer used in this song was a Yamaha DX7.

== Music video ==
At the beginning of the video, the notes of the introductory saxophone riff are played as Frey (who does not sing during the entire video) sits in his apartment in New York, looking out the window and smoking. Elsewhere, a woman prepares at home for a night on the town. She has Miami Vice playing on the television, a pattern which is repeated every time a television is shown in the video. Frey leaves the apartment and walks the streets of the city, his journey interspersed with scenes representative of New York nightlife and culture. He crosses paths with the woman when the taxi she is riding in almost runs him over. Later, they meet again when Frey sees her through the window of a pub, then walks in. She sees him and he watches her brush off the advances of another man but makes no move to approach her himself. Finally, he gets up to leave, but the woman catches him as he hails a taxi and they decide to walk back to her place together. The video then cuts to Frey leaving her high-rise the next morning. In the final shot of the video, Frey gazes out onto a vista of New York City from Carl Schurz Park while tossing a cigarette into the East River.

Two versions of the video exist: one with the Miami Vice intercuts and one without.

== Reception ==
Cash Box said it is "a mid-tempo rocker which features all the power of Frey's vocal style."

== Charts ==
=== Weekly charts ===
Chart (1985–1986)	Peak position
Australian Singles (Kent Music Report)	20
Canada Adult Contemporary (RPM)	2
Canada Top Singles (RPM)	6
Finnish Singles (The Official Finnish Charts)	29
French Singles (IFOP)	63
Ireland (IRMA)	26
Netherlands (Single Top 100)	37
New Zealand (Recorded Music NZ)	46
UK Singles (Official Charts)	94
US Billboard Hot 100	2
US Mainstream Rock (Billboard)	1
US Adult Contemporary (Billboard)	2
US Cash Box	3

=== Year-end charts ===
Chart (1985)	Position
Canada Top Singles (RPM)	57
US Billboard Hot 100	30
US Cash Box	34

== See also ==
- List of Billboard Mainstream Rock number-one songs of the 1980s
