= History of the Eagles =

2013 documentary about the American rock group the Eagles

- Directed by: Alison Ellwood
- Produced by: Alex Gibney
- Starring: Glenn Frey; Don Henley; Bernie Leadon; Randy Meisner; Don Felder; Joe Walsh; Timothy B. Schmit
- Music by: Eagles
- Production company: Jigsaw Productions
- Distributed by: Showtime
- Release date: January 19, 2013 (Sundance)
- Running time: 186 minutes
- Country: United States
- Language: English

History of the Eagles is a 2013 two-part authorized documentary about the career of the American rock group the Eagles, directed by Alison Ellwood and co-produced by Alex Gibney. After screening at the 2013 Sundance Film Festival in January, it aired on Showtime in February, and was released in April on DVD and Blu-ray with a third disc containing eight songs from the band's performance at the Capital Centre in March 1977. A concert tour of the same name took place from 2013 to 2015, visiting North America, Europe, and Oceania.

At the 65th Primetime Creative Arts Emmy Awards, the film received the award for Outstanding Sound Mixing for Nonfiction Programming. It was also nominated for Outstanding Sound Editing for Nonfiction Programming (Single or Multi-Camera).

The Super Deluxe Limited Edition Box Set received a Bronze Prize at the 2013 Key Art Awards.

== Background ==
The documentary is intended to be an official account of the history of the Eagles. The band's manager, Irving Azoff, came up with the idea for an official history in 2011 when the Eagles would be celebrating their 40th anniversary. Frey chose Alex Gibney after viewing works by those who had been nominated for the Academy Award for best documentary, and Gibney then brought in Ellwood to direct and co-edit. According to Frey, the band had made some suggestions to the production team, but overall the director and producer were left to make their film the way they chose.

Part 1 of History of the Eagles premiered at the Eccles Theater in Park City, Utah, during the Sundance Film Festival on January 19, 2013, followed by screenings at other locations in the week. The first part was aired on February 15, 2013, on Showtime, and the second part the following night.

== Content ==
The documentary is divided into two parts. The first part is around two hours long and covers the early period to their breakup, the second part is about one hour long and covers the subsequent periods. The documentary combined archive footage of the band with interviews with all the members of the band, as well as other people involved in the band history or who knew them, such as Kenny Rogers, Bob Seger, Linda Ronstadt, Jackson Browne, JD Souther, David Geffen, and Stevie Nicks. In the DVD release, a further third disc with songs from the band's concert at the Capital Centre in March 1977 is included.

=== Part 1 ===
Part one of the documentary traced the beginning of the band to the breakup in 1980. It chronicles the early life of band members and the founding of the band, the making of their albums and their rise to success, the subsequent conflicts between band members, concluding with the breakup of the band.

=== Part 2 ===
Part two of the documentary begins with the period following the breakup, with brief accounts of the careers of individual members of the band and by the reunion of the band in 1994, followed by the 1990s and 21st century phases of the Eagles. The documentary shows that Frey was resistant to the idea of a reunion until they joined Travis Tritt for the making of the video of his cover of "Take It Easy". It documents their successful tours, the dispute with Don Felder and the period after his dismissal. It concludes with the band members looking back assessing their actions and career, with contributions from other people who knew them.

== Reactions ==
Don Felder, who participated in the documentary, claimed that History of the Eagles was incomplete, that it glorified Don Henley and Glenn Frey's work and did not give enough credit to all the other people who had contributed to the group, as well as glossing over disputes between band members. Felder said: "Overall I thought it was OK, but I didn't think it was really an accurate documentary. I thought a lot was omitted from the documentary. There were a lot of things that weren't discussed, a lot of issues that aren't brought to the forefront." He said he had put his disputes with the band behind him, and expressed surprise by the anger still felt by Frey and Henley towards him, and said of the documentary: "Most of it was about Don and Glenn. But they controlled it, owned it, and paid for it, so they could do what they wanted. But it did take me back how angry they were and how much venom they still had toward me, especially Glenn."

However, Henley said that Felder had continued to engage in legal actions, unspecified by Henley, against them. Nevertheless, Henley admitted to Felder's charge that his conflicts with Frey had been downplayed in the film, and said: "We have had our differences, we still do, but we’re a lot like brothers. We fight but we’re still family." Henley saw History of the Eagles as being instructive on how bands need leaders and cannot work as a democracy. Henley reiterated a point made by Frey in the documentary: "The thing about bands is you have to have leaders in a band. Everybody can’t be on equal footing. It’s like a football team. Somebody's got to be the quarterback. Somebody’s got to snap the ball, somebody's got to run with the ball, somebody's got to block. If people play their positions and play their strengths everything turns out well. The whole is greater than the sum of the parts. We always understood that, some of the other people apparently didn't understand that."

The documentary received a Metacritic rating of 74 based on 4 critics, indicating generally favorable reviews.

== Certifications ==
Region	Certification	Certified units/sales
Australia (ARIA)	2× Platinum	30,000^{^}
Canada (Music Canada)	9× Platinum	90,000^{^}
United Kingdom (BPI)	Gold	25,000^{*}
United States (RIAA)	Platinum	100,000^{^}
^{*} Sales figures based on certification alone.^{^} Shipments figures based on certification alone.
