= True Love (Glenn Frey song) =

Single by Glenn Frey

from the album Soul Searchin'
- B-side: "Working Man"
- Released: August 1988
- Genre: Soft rock
- Length: 4:10 (single version); 4:40 (Album version)
- Label: MCA
- Songwriters: Glenn Frey, Jack Tempchin
- Producers: Elliot Scheiner, Glenn Frey

Glenn Frey singles chronology
"You Belong to the City" (1985)	"True Love" (1988)	"Soul Searchin'" (1989)

Music video
- "True Love" on YouTube

"True Love" is a song by American musician and singer-songwriter Glenn Frey, a member of the Eagles. It was released as a single from his third studio solo album Soul Searchin', in 1988. The single features a ballad version of the track "Working Man" as the B-side. An uptempo version was included on the album.

== Background ==
In the liner notes to the original album Glenn Frey wrote of the song "For those of you who have my previous albums, I apologize. I just can't shake my obsession with this Al Green-Memphis thing. Like Wilson Pickett says, 'Don't fight it'."

== Reception ==
The song was one of Frey's biggest hit singles in his solo career, peaking at No. 13 on the Billboard Hot 100 and No. 2 on both the U.S. Adult Contemporary chart and Canadian singles chart. It also peaked at No. 49 on the Australian charts. In the UK it reached No. 84.

Cash Box said that it's "a classic R&B tune replete with hornbreaks and soul-tinged arrangement and production."

== Personnel ==
- Glenn Frey – lead and backing vocals, keyboards, guitars, bass, drums, horn arrangements
- Barry Beckett – keyboards
- Robbie Buchanan – keyboards
- Ralph MacDonald – percussion
- Chris Mostert – saxophone
- The Heart Attack Horns – horns
- Julia Waters – backing vocals
- Maxine Waters – backing vocals
- Greg Smith – horn arrangements

== Charts ==
=== Weekly charts ===
Chart (1988)	Peak position
Australia (ARIA)	49
Canada Top Singles (RPM)	2
Italy Airplay (Music & Media)	2
UK Singles (Official Charts)	84
US Billboard Hot 100	13
US Adult Contemporary (Billboard)	2
US Mainstream Rock (Billboard)	5

=== Year-end charts ===
Chart (1988)	Peak position
Canada Top Singles (RPM)	71
US Adult Contemporary (Billboard)	41
