= Long Road Out of Eden Tour =

2008–11 concert tour by the Eagles

- Tour by Eagles
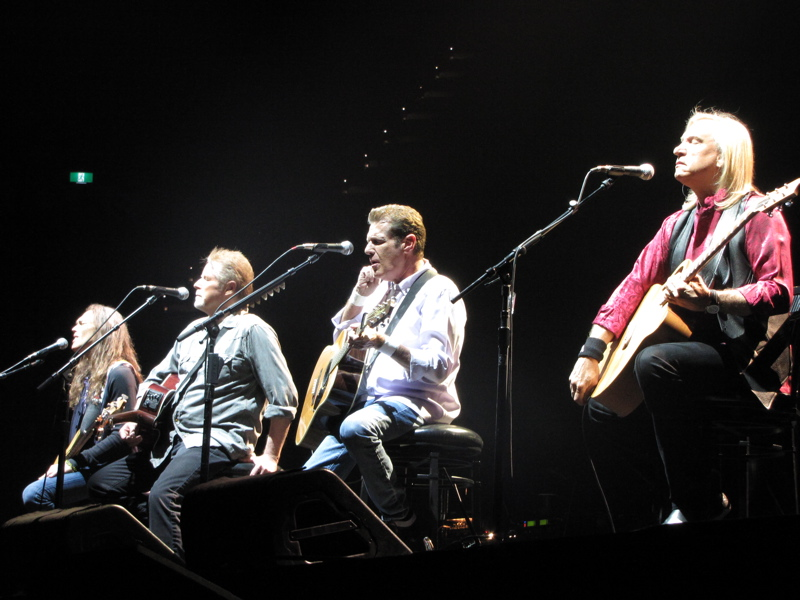
- Eagles in concert, Australia, December 2010
- Associated album: Long Road Out of Eden
- Start date: March 20, 2008
- End date: November 19, 2011
- Legs: 7
- No. of shows: 161

Eagles concert chronology
- Farewell 1 Tour (2004); Long Road Out of Eden Tour (2008–11); History of the Eagles – Live in Concert (2013–15)

The Long Road Out of Eden Tour was a worldwide concert tour by the Eagles, whose beginning coincided with the release of their 2007 album Long Road Out of Eden. The tour began in London, at The O_{2} arena on March 20, 2008, and ended on November 19, 2011, with a show at the MGM Grand Garden Arena in Las Vegas. In 2010, the Eagles toured alongside the Dixie Chicks, with Keith Urban appearing at selected shows. The tour changed its name to the Eagles 2010 Summer Tour. That leg of the tour focused on stadium shows, such as in Winnipeg and Toronto and New Jersey. The December 2010 Eagles tour of Australia was packaged as Eagles Summer 2010.

== Tour dates ==
List of concerts, showing date, city, country, venue, tickets sold, number of available tickets and amount of gross revenue
Date	City	Country	Venue	Tickets sold/available	Box office
Europe
March 20, 2008	London	England	The O_{2} Arena	—	—
March 22, 2008	London	England	The O_{2} Arena	—	—
March 23, 2008	London	England	The O_{2} Arena	—	—
March 26, 2008	London	England	The O_{2} Arena	—	—
April 1, 2008	Rotterdam	Netherlands	Rotterdam Ahoy	—	—
April 3, 2008	Rotterdam	Netherlands	Rotterdam Ahoy	—	—
North America
May 2, 2008	Indio	United States	Stagecoach Festival	—	—
May 14, 2008	Alpharetta	United States	Verizon Wireless Amphitheatre at Encore Park	—	—
May 16, 2008	Alpharetta	United States	Verizon Wireless Amphitheatre at Encore Park	—	—
May 17, 2008	Alpharetta	United States	Verizon Wireless Amphitheatre at Encore Park	—	—
May 20, 2008	Alpharetta	United States	Verizon Wireless Amphitheatre at Encore Park	—	—
May 21, 2008	Charlottesville	United States	John Paul Jones Arena	12,724 / 12,724	$1,542,750
May 24, 2008	Newark	United States	Prudential Center	22,648 / 22,648	$1,690,748
May 25, 2008	Newark	United States	Prudential Center	22,648 / 22,648	$1,690,748
May 28, 2008	New York City	United States	Madison Square Garden	38,182 / 38,182	$4,962,090
May 30, 2008	New York City	United States	Madison Square Garden	38,182 / 38,182	$4,962,090
May 31, 2008	New York City	United States	Madison Square Garden	38,182 / 38,182	$4,962,090
July 14, 2008	Philadelphia	United States	Wachovia Center	—	—
July 17, 2008	Atlantic City	United States	The Borgata	—	—
July 19, 2008	Atlantic City	United States	The Borgata	—	—
July 21, 2008	Toronto	Canada	Air Canada Centre	41,495 / 42,024	$5,614,546
July 22, 2008	Toronto	Canada	Air Canada Centre	41,495 / 42,024	$5,614,546
July 26, 2008	Toronto	Canada	Air Canada Centre	41,495 / 42,024	$5,614,546
July 27, 2008	Washington, D.C.	United States	Verizon Center	14,403 / 14,403	$1,922,878
July 28, 2008	Boston	United States	TD Banknorth Garden	24,097 / 24,598	$2,989,885
July 30, 2008	Boston	United States	TD Banknorth Garden	24,097 / 24,598	$2,989,885
August 2, 2008	Moncton	Canada	Magnetic Hill Concert Site	45,923 / 50,000	$6,333,311
September 6, 2008	Tulsa	United States	BOK Center	—	—
September 8, 2008	San Antonio	United States	AT&T Center	—	—
September 9, 2008	Houston	United States	Toyota Center	—	—
September 13, 2008	Dallas	United States	American Airlines Center	—	—
September 14, 2008	Dallas	United States	American Airlines Center	—	—
September 16, 2008	North Little Rock	United States	Alltel Arena	—	—
September 18, 2008	Nashville	United States	Sommet Center	—	—
September 20, 2008	St. Louis	United States	Scottrade Center	—	—
September 21, 2008	Milwaukee	United States	Bradley Center	—	—
September 24, 2008	Chicago	United States	United Center	—	—
September 25, 2008	Chicago	United States	United Center	—	—
September 29, 2008	Ashwaubenon	United States	Resch Center	5,932 / 5,932	$777,820
September 30, 2008	Minneapolis	United States	Target Center	—	—
November 8, 2008	Omaha	United States	Qwest Center Omaha	—	—
November 9, 2008	Kansas City	United States	Sprint Center	—	—
November 11, 2008	Tulsa	United States	BOK Center	—	—
November 13, 2008	Springfield	United States	JQH Arena	—	—
November 15, 2008	Dallas	United States	American Airlines Center	13,654 / 15,285	$1,746,880
November 16, 2008	Memphis	United States	FedExForum	—	—
November 18, 2008	Cincinnati	United States	U.S. Bank Arena	—	—
November 20, 2008	Washington, D.C.	United States	Verizon Center	—	—
November 21, 2008	Pittsburgh	United States	Mellon Arena	—	—
November 23, 2008	Hershey	United States	Giant Center	—	—
November 25, 2008	Philadelphia	United States	Wachovia Center	—	—
November 26, 2008	Worcester	United States	DCU Center	9,731 / 11,587	$837,530
December 1, 2008	Houston	United States	Toyota Center	—	—
January 12, 2009	Hampton	United States	Hampton Coliseum	—	—
January 14, 2009	Charlotte	United States	Time Warner Cable Arena	—	—
January 16, 2009	North Charleston	United States	North Charleston Coliseum	—	—
January 17, 2009	Greensboro	United States	Greensboro Coliseum	—	—
January 19, 2009	Greenville	United States	BI-LO Center	—	—
January 21, 2009	Knoxville	United States	Thompson–Boling Arena	—	—
January 23, 2009	New Orleans	United States	New Orleans Arena	—	—
January 24, 2009	Birmingham	United States	BJCC Arena	—	—
January 26, 2009	Sunrise	United States	BankAtlantic Center	—	—
January 28, 2009	Jacksonville	United States	Jacksonville Veterans Memorial Arena	11,076	—
January 29, 2009	Tampa	United States	St. Pete Times Forum	—	—
January 31, 2009	Orlando	United States	Amway Arena	—	—
March 7, 2009	Edmonton	Canada	Rexall Place	13,299 / 13,299	$1,542,602
March 8, 2009	Saskatoon	Canada	Credit Union Centre	—	—
March 10, 2009	Saskatoon	Canada	Credit Union Centre	—	—
March 11, 2009	Saskatoon	Canada	Credit Union Centre	—	—
March 13, 2009	Winnipeg	Canada	MTS Centre	12,424 / 12,424	$1,399,562
March 15, 2009	Fargo	United States	Fargodome	9,377 / 12,268	$990,901
March 17, 2009	Columbia	United States	Mizzou Arena	—	—
March 18, 2009	Moline	United States	IWireless Center	9,968 / 9,968	$1,092,718
March 21, 2009	Auburn Hills	United States	The Palace of Auburn Hills	—	—
March 22, 2009	Indianapolis	United States	Conseco Fieldhouse	—	—
March 24, 2009	Cleveland	United States	Quicken Loans Arena	—	—
March 26, 2009	Hoffman Estates	United States	Sears Centre	—	—
March 28, 2009	Kansas City	United States	Sprint Center	—	—
March 29, 2009	Columbus	United States	Value City Arena	—	—
May 9, 2009	Sandy	United States	Rio Tinto Stadium	—	—
Europe
May 29, 2009	Malmö	Sweden	Malmö Stadion	—	—
May 30, 2009	Aarhus	Denmark	Aarhus Stadion	—	—
June 1, 2009	Bergen	Norway	Koengen	22,000 / 22,000	$2,567,606
June 4, 2009	Helsinki	Finland	Hartwall Arena	9,829 / 10,120	$1,941,705
June 7, 2009	Berlin	Germany	O2 World	—	—
June 8, 2009	Prague	Czech Republic	O2 Arena	—	—
June 10, 2009	Vienna	Austria	Wiener Stadthalle	—	—
June 12, 2009	Zürich	Switzerland	Hallenstadion	—	—
June 13, 2009	Milan	Italy	Datchforum	—	—
June 15, 2009	Munich	Germany	Olympiahalle	—	—
June 17, 2009	Cologne	Germany	Lanxess Arena	—	—
June 18, 2009	Antwerp	Belgium	Sportpaleis	—	—
June 28, 2009	Galway	Ireland	Pearse Stadium	—	—
June 30, 2009	Belfast	Northern Ireland	Odyssey Arena	—	—
July 2, 2009	Ballsbridge	Ireland	RDS Arena	—	—
July 4, 2009	Glasgow	Scotland	Hampden Park	—	—
July 7, 2009	Birmingham	England	National Indoor Arena	—	—
July 8, 2009	Birmingham	England	National Indoor Arena	—	—
July 11, 2009	Manchester	England	Manchester Evening News Arena	—	—
July 12, 2009	Manchester	England	Manchester Evening News Arena	—	—
July 16, 2009	Hamburg	Germany	Color Line Arena	—	—
July 18, 2009	Arnhem	Netherlands	GelreDome	30,523 / 30,523	$3,051,937
July 21, 2009	Madrid	Spain	Palacio de los Deportes	—	—
July 22, 2009	Lisbon	Portugal	Pavilhão Atlântico	—	—
North America
April 16, 2010	Los Angeles	United States	Hollywood Bowl	48,210 / 52,344	$5,592,685
April 17, 2010	Los Angeles	United States	Hollywood Bowl	48,210 / 52,344	$5,592,685
April 20, 2010	Los Angeles	United States	Hollywood Bowl	48,210 / 52,344	$5,592,685
April 21, 2010	Phoenix	United States	US Airways Center	13,653 / 14,511	$1,407,062
April 24, 2010	Las Vegas	United States	MGM Grand Garden Arena	12,970 / 12,970	$1,631,745
April 25, 2010	Anaheim	United States	Honda Center	12,356 / 12,356	$1,434,641
April 27, 2010	Sacramento	United States	ARCO Arena	13,291 / 13,291	$1,459,054
April 30, 2010	San Jose	United States	HP Pavilion	26,795 / 26,795	$2,609,724
May 1, 2010	San Jose	United States	HP Pavilion	26,795 / 26,795	$2,609,724
May 9, 2010	Vancouver	Canada	GM Place	28,249 / 28,848	$3,665,760
May 10, 2010	Vancouver	Canada	GM Place	28,249 / 28,848	$3,665,760
May 20, 2010	Denver	United States	Pepsi Center	12,408 / 12,848	$1,359,554
May 22, 2010	Ontario	United States	Citizens Business Bank Arena	7,982 / 8,261	$830,532
May 23, 2010	Chula Vista	United States	Cricket Wireless Amphitheatre	15,003 / 19,317	$1,111,105
May 26, 2010 (Note: The May 26, 2010 concert in Seattle, Washington at the KeyArena was originally planned to take place on May 13, but was rescheduled due to illness of Schmit.)	Seattle	United States	KeyArena	11,272 / 11,757	$1,299,948
May 29, 2010	Portland	United States	Rose Garden Arena	10,909 / 11,079	$1,212,224
May 30, 2010	Nampa	United States	Idaho Center	6,442 / 8,831	$639,571
June 1, 2010	Vancouver	Canada	PNE Coliseum	7,985 / 9,961	$911,420
June 8, 2010	Toronto	Canada	Rogers Centre	35,681 / 36,000	$3,580,610
June 10, 2010	East Rutherford	United States	New Meadowlands Stadium	31,482 / 33,564	$3,390,308
June 13, 2010	Foxborough	United States	Gillette Stadium	26,433 / 41,582	$2,822,410
June 17, 2010	Raleigh	United States	RBC Center	9,667 / 10,307	$1,019,694
June 19, 2010	Chicago	United States	Soldier Field	29,233 / 32,420	$3,186,493
June 22, 2010	Winnipeg	Canada	Canad Inns Stadium	21,629 / 26,508	$2,260,970
June 24, 2010	St. Louis	United States	Busch Stadium	25,904 / 35,318	$2,151,706
June 26, 2010	Dallas	United States	American Airlines Center	13,587 / 14,258	$1,710,540
June 27, 2010	Houston	United States	Toyota Center	11,827 / 12,069	$1,559,275
June 30, 2010	Wichita	United States	Intrust Bank Arena	10,196 / 10,446	$1,132,010
July 1, 2010	North Little Rock	United States	Verizon Arena	—	—
October 1, 2010	Reno	United States	Reno Events Center	6,259 / 6,259	$1,011,851
October 2, 2010	Oakland	United States	Oracle Arena	10,576 / 12,421	$1,008,175
October 10, 2010	Austin	United States	Austin City Limits Music Festival	—	—
October 12, 2010	Indianapolis	United States	Conseco Fieldhouse	8,653 / 11,822	$903,346
October 15, 2010	Atlanta	United States	Piedmont Park	27,217 / 30,000	$2,060,485
October 16, 2010	Louisville	United States	KFC Yum! Center	15,232 / 15,232	$1,709,625
October 19, 2010	Pittsburgh	United States	Consol Energy Center	12,163 / 12,163	$1,198,949
October 20, 2010	Toledo	United States	Huntington Center	7,720 / 7,720	$874,714
October 22, 2010	University Park	United States	Bryce Jordan Center	8,393 / 12,104	$842,911
October 24, 2010	Des Moines	United States	Wells Fargo Arena	13,970 / 13,970	$1,228,890
October 26, 2010	Orlando	United States	Amway Arena	12,773 / 12,773	$1,278,614
October 27, 2010	Sunrise	United States	BankAtlantic Center	11,007 / 13,776	$1,070,103
October 29, 2010	Lubbock	United States	United Spirit Arena	10,038 / 10,038	$999,640
Australia
November 30, 2010	Sydney	Australia	Sydney Entertainment Centre	29,112 / 30,000	$5,803,490
December 2, 2010	Sydney	Australia	Sydney Entertainment Centre	29,112 / 30,000	$5,803,490
December 3, 2010	Sydney	Australia	Sydney Entertainment Centre	29,112 / 30,000	$5,803,490
December 6, 2010	Sydney	Australia	Acer Arena	28,296 / 28,296	$5,825,040
December 7, 2010	Sydney	Australia	Acer Arena	28,296 / 28,296	$5,825,040
December 10, 2010	Perth	Australia	nib Stadium	—	—
December 13, 2010	Brisbane	Australia	Brisbane Entertainment Centre	22,107 / 22,362	$5,155,790
December 14, 2010	Brisbane	Australia	Brisbane Entertainment Centre	22,107 / 22,362	$5,155,790
December 17, 2010	Melbourne	Australia	Rod Laver Arena	50,485 / 50,800	$9,438,730
December 18, 2010	Melbourne	Australia	Rod Laver Arena	50,485 / 50,800	$9,438,730
December 21, 2010	Melbourne	Australia	Rod Laver Arena	50,485 / 50,800	$9,438,730
December 22, 2010	Melbourne	Australia	Rod Laver Arena	50,485 / 50,800	$9,438,730
Asia
February 20, 2011	Bangkok	Thailand	Impact Arena	9,884 / 9,996	$1,324,474
February 23, 2011	Singapore	Singapore	Singapore Indoor Stadium	9,399 / 10,495	$2,101,201
February 26, 2011	Taipei	Taiwan	Linkou Stadium	14,601 / 20,454	$1,700,488
February 27, 2011	Taipei	Taiwan	Linkou Stadium	14,601 / 20,454	$1,700,488
March 1, 2011	Osaka	Japan	Osaka Dome	21,980 / 30,000	$3,098,218
March 3, 2011	Nagoya	Japan	Nagoya Dome	9,321 / 15,000	$1,298,254
March 5, 2011	Tokyo	Japan	Tokyo Dome	54,883 / 80,000	$7,689,462
March 6, 2011	Tokyo	Japan	Tokyo Dome	54,883 / 80,000	$7,689,462
March 9, 2011	Shanghai	China	Mercedes-Benz Arena	5,979 / 10,048	$1,055,418
March 12, 2011	Beijing	China	MasterCard Center	6,184 / 9,049	$990,415
March 15, 2011	Seoul	South Korea	Olympic Gymnastics Arena	11,125 / 11,698	$2,013,917
March 18, 2011	Hong Kong	Hong Kong	Hong Kong Convention and Exhibition Centre	7,298 / 7,462	$1,452,183
Europe
June 9, 2011	Reykjavík	Iceland	Laugardalshöll	—	—
June 12, 2011	Stavanger	Norway	Viking Stadion	—	—
June 13, 2011	Oslo	Norway	Norwegian Wood	—	—
June 15, 2011	Aalborg	Denmark	Hjallerup	—	—
June 17, 2011	Sundsvall	Sweden	Norrporten Arena	—	—
June 19, 2011	Wiesbaden	Germany	Bowling Green	—	—
June 21, 2011	Cologne	Germany	Lanxess Arena	—	—
June 23, 2011	Berlin	Germany	Waldbühne	—	—
June 25, 2011	Graz	Austria	Schwarzl Freizeitzentrum	—	—
June 26, 2011	Munich	Germany	Königsplatz	—	—
June 28, 2011	Hamburg	Germany	O2 World	—	—
July 1, 2011	Paddock Wood	England	Hop Farm Festival	—	—
North America
November 5, 2011	Las Vegas	United States	MGM Grand Garden Arena	—	—
November 19, 2011	Las Vegas	United States	MGM Grand Garden Arena	—	—
