= Sexy Girl (Glenn Frey song) =

Single by Glenn Frey

from the album The Allnighter
- B-side: "Better in the U.S.A."
- Released: June 1984
- Recorded: 1984
- Genre: Pop rock
- Length: 3:30
- Label: MCA
- Songwriters: Glenn Frey; Jack Tempchin
- Producers: Glenn Frey; Barry Beckett; Allan Blazek

Glenn Frey singles chronology
| "All Those Lies" (1983) | "Sexy Girl" (1984) | "The Allnighter" (1984) |

Official audio
- "Sexy Girl" on YouTube

"Sexy Girl" is a song by Glenn Frey, the guitarist and co-lead vocalist for the Eagles. It was released as the lead single from his second solo studio album The Allnighter (1984).

== Chart performance ==
"Sexy Girl" was a moderate success, peaking at No. 20 on the Billboard Hot 100 in August 1984. The song also became a minor hit in Australia and Canada.

== Music video ==
The video features a cameo appearance by then Los Angeles Raiders defensive end Howie Long.

== Track listings ==
7" single

1. "Sexy Girl" – 3:30
2. "Better in the U.S.A." – 3:00

== Personnel ==
- Glenn Frey – lead and backing vocals, electric guitar, bass guitar
- Barry Beckett – synthesizers, acoustic piano
- Duncan Cameron – harmony vocals, lead guitar
- Larrie Londin – drums
- Roy Galloway – backing vocals
- Jack Tempchin – backing vocals
- Luther Waters – backing vocals
- Oren Waters – backing vocals

== Charts ==
| Chart (1984–1985) | Peak position |
|---|---|
| Australian Singles (Kent Music Report) | 76 |
| Canada Top Singles (RPM) | 48 |
| Canada Adult Contemporary (RPM) | 12 |
| UK Singles (Official Charts) | 81 |
| US Billboard Hot 100 | 20 |
| US Adult Contemporary (Billboard) | 23 |
