= Glenn Frey =

American rock musician and songwriter (1948–2016)

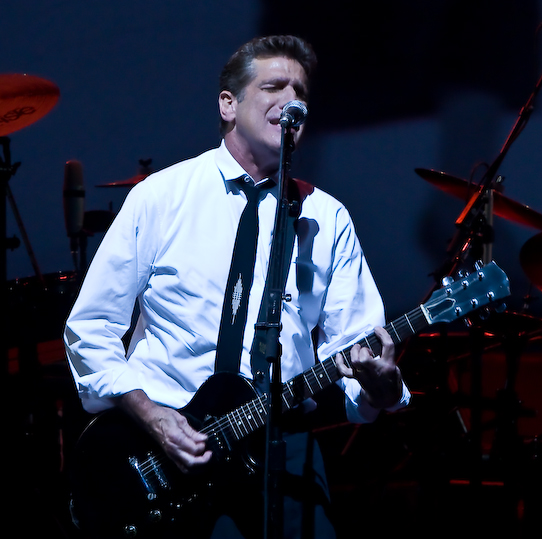
- Frey in 2008
- Born: Glenn Lewis Frey; November 6, 1948; Detroit, Michigan, U.S.
- Died: January 18, 2016 (aged 67); New York City, U.S.
- Occupations: Musician; singer; songwriter; actor
- Years active: 1966–2016
- Spouses: Janie Beggs (m. 1983; div. 1988); Cindy Millican (m. 1990)
- Children: 3, including Deacon
- Musical career
- Genres: Rock; pop rock; soft rock; country rock (early); hard rock (later)
- Instruments: Vocals; guitar; keyboards
- Labels: Asylum; MCA
- Formerly of: Eagles; Longbranch Pennywhistle

Glenn Lewis Frey (/fraɪ/; November 6, 1948 – January 18, 2016) was an American musician and songwriter. He was a founding member of the rock band Eagles, for whom he was the co-lead singer and frontman, roles he came to share with fellow member Don Henley, with whom he wrote most of Eagles' material. Frey played guitar and keyboards as well as singing lead vocals on songs such as "Take It Easy", "Peaceful Easy Feeling", "Tequila Sunrise", "Already Gone", "James Dean", "Lyin' Eyes", "New Kid in Town", and "Heartache Tonight".

While Eagles were on hiatus from 1980 to 1994, Frey embarked on a successful solo career. He released his debut album, No Fun Aloud, in 1982 and went on to record Top 40 hits "The One You Love", "Smuggler's Blues", "Sexy Girl", "The Heat Is On", "You Belong to the City", "True Love", "Soul Searchin'", and "Livin' Right". As a member of Eagles, Frey won six Grammy Awards and five American Music Awards. Eagles were inducted into the Rock and Roll Hall of Fame in 1998, the first year they were nominated. Consolidating his solo recordings and those with the Eagles, Frey had 24 Top 40 singles on the Billboard Hot 100.

== Early life ==
Born in Detroit, Michigan, on November 6, 1948, and raised in nearby Royal Oak, Frey studied piano at age five, later switched to guitar, and became part of the mid-1960s Detroit rock scene. One of his earliest bands was called the Subterraneans, named after Jack Kerouac's novel, and included fellow Dondero High School classmates Doug Edwards (later replaced by Lenny Mintz) on drums, Doug Gunsch and Bill Barnes on guitar, with Jeff Hodge on bass.

Immediately after graduating from Dondero in 1966, Frey was invited to join The Four of Us, a local band led by Gary Burrows, who had seen him performing with the Subterraneans. Frey also attended Oakland Community College while in the band, and he learned to sing harmonies performing with The Four of Us. In 1967, he formed the Mushrooms with Gary Burrows' brother Jeff, Bill Barnes, Doug Gunsch, Ken Bash, and Lenny Mintz. That year Frey also met Bob Seger, who helped Frey get a management and recording contract with a label formed by Seger's management team, Hideout Records. Seger also wrote and produced the band's first single, "Such a Lovely Child", and the band made television appearances to promote it. Frey had intended to join Seger's band, but his mother blocked that course of action for smoking cannabis with Seger. In the later part of 1967, Frey also pulled together another band called Heavy Metal Kids with Jeff Burrows (piano), Jeff Alborell (bass), Paul Kelcourse (lead guitar), and Lance Dickerson (drums).

At age 19 in 1968, Frey played the acoustic guitar and performed background vocals on Seger's single, "Ramblin' Gamblin' Man". Frey has said that Seger strongly encouraged and influenced him to focus on writing original songs. They remained good friends and occasional songwriting partners in later years, and Frey would also sing on Seger's songs such as "Fire Lake" and "Against the Wind".

In Detroit, Frey also met and dated Joan Sliwin of the local female group The Mama Cats, which became Honey Ltd. after the group moved to California in 1968. Frey went to Los Angeles hoping to reconnect with his girlfriend, and he was introduced to JD Souther by her sister, Alexandra Sliwin, who was with Souther at the time. Frey returned to Detroit after three weeks, but then went back again to Los Angeles to form a duo with Souther called Longbranch Pennywhistle. They were signed to Amos Records and released an eponymous album in 1969, which contains songs he wrote such as "Run, Boy, Run" and "Rebecca", and "Bring Back Funky Women", which he co-wrote with Souther. Frey also met Jackson Browne during this period. The three musicians lived in the same apartment building for a short time, and Frey later said that he learned a lot about songwriting from hearing Browne work on songs in the apartment below.

== Eagles ==
Frey met drummer Don Henley in 1970. They were signed to the same label, Amos Records, at that time and spent time at the Troubadour. When Linda Ronstadt needed a backup band for an upcoming tour, her manager John Boylan hired Frey because Boylan needed someone who could play rhythm guitar and sing. Frey approached Don Henley to join Ronstadt. Randy Meisner and Bernie Leadon were also hired. Because the backing band personnel changed during the tour, the four played together only once: at a gig at Disneyland. While on the tour, Frey and Henley decided to form a band together and were joined by Meisner on bass and Leadon on guitar, banjo, steel guitar, mandolin, and dobro, forming the Eagles, with Frey playing guitar and keyboards and Henley playing drums. The band went on to become one of the world's bestselling groups of all time. Frey wrote or co-wrote (often with Henley) many of the group's songs, and sang the lead vocals on a number of Eagles hits including "Take It Easy", "Peaceful Easy Feeling", "Already Gone", "Tequila Sunrise", "Lyin' Eyes", "New Kid in Town", "Heartache Tonight" and "How Long".

The Eagles broke up around 1980 and reunited in 1994, when they released a new album, Hell Freezes Over. The album had live tracks and four new songs. The Hell Freezes Over Tour followed. In 2012 on The Tavis Smiley Show, Frey told Smiley, "When the Eagles broke up, people used to ask me and Don, 'When are the Eagles getting back together?' We used to answer, 'When Hell freezes over.' We thought it was a pretty good joke. People have the misconception that we were fighting a lot. It is not true. We had a lot of fun. We had a lot more fun than I think people realize." At their first live concert of 1994, Frey told the crowd, "For the record, we never broke up. We just took a 14-year vacation."

In 2007, the Eagles released the album Long Road Out of Eden, and Frey participated in the Eagles' Long Road Out of Eden Tour (2008–2011).

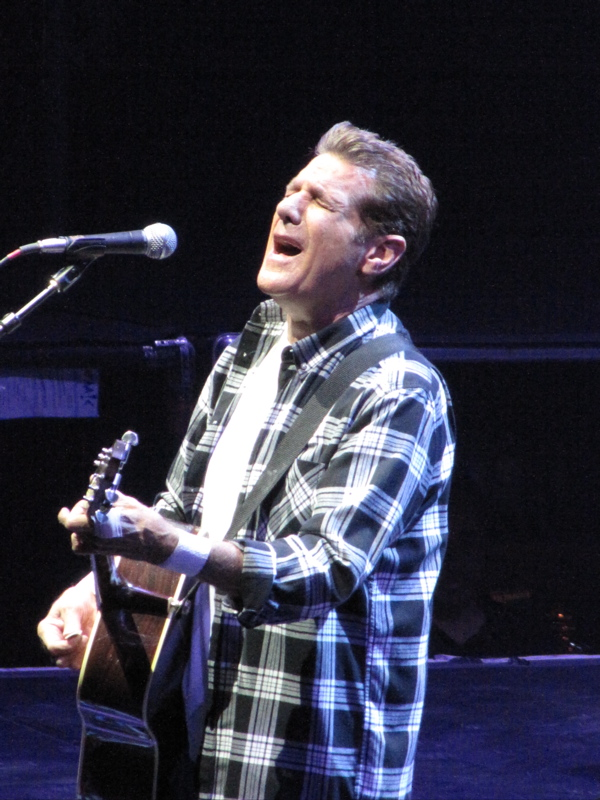
Frey with the Eagles in 2010

In May 2012, Frey was awarded an honorary Doctorate of Music from Berklee College of Music along with Henley, Joe Walsh and Timothy B. Schmit.

In 2013, the two-part documentary History of the Eagles, directed by Alison Ellwood and co-produced by Academy Award winner Alex Gibney, was aired on Showtime. The documentary won an Emmy Award in 2013 for Outstanding Sound Mixing For Nonfiction Programming. An accompanying two-year History of the Eagles world tour ended on July 29, 2015, at Bossier City, Louisiana, a concert which would be Frey's final public appearance with the band.

While the July 29, 2015, concert would be Frey's last public performance, he and the Eagles played a private concert two days later at Christian Brothers College High School, St. Louis, for a major school donor's 59th birthday. The concert was kept secret, and even the 300 people invited did not know that they would be treated to an Eagles concert featuring nine songs.

== Solo career ==
After the Eagles disbanded, Frey achieved solo success in the 1980s, especially with two No. 2 hits. In 1984, he recorded in collaboration with Harold Faltermeyer the worldwide hit "The Heat Is On", the main theme from the Eddie Murphy action comedy film Beverly Hills Cop. Frey then performed "You Belong to the City" (from the television series Miami Vice, the soundtrack of which stayed on top of the U.S. album charts for 11 weeks in 1985). His other contribution to the soundtrack, "Smuggler's Blues", hit No. 12 on the Billboard Hot 100. During his solo career, Frey had 12 charting songs in the U.S. Top 100. Eleven of those were written with Jack Tempchin, who wrote "Peaceful Easy Feeling".

Frey was the first choice to record "Shakedown", the theme for the film Beverly Hills Cop II. He did not like the lyrics and then came down with laryngitis, so the song was given to Bob Seger. After the song went to number one, Frey called to congratulate Seger, saying "At least we kept the money in Michigan!"

Frey contributed the song "Flip City" to the Ghostbusters II soundtrack and "Part of Me, Part of You" to the soundtrack for Thelma & Louise. In 2005, he appeared on B.B. King & Friends: 80 on the track "Drivin' Wheel".

In the late 1990s, Frey founded a record company, Mission Records, with attorney Peter Lopez. Frey never released any of his own work on the label, and the company has since disbanded.

In 2009, Frey was voted into the Michigan Rock and Roll Legends Hall of Fame.

On May 8, 2012, Frey released his first solo album in 20 years, After Hours, featuring covers of pop standards from the 1940s to the 1960s. It was his final album before his death.

== Acting career ==
As a television actor, Frey guest starred on Miami Vice in the first-season episode "Smuggler's Blues", inspired by his hit song of the same name, and had a starring role in the "Dead Dog Records Arc" of Wiseguy. Frey was also the star of South of Sunset, which was canceled after one episode. In the late 1990s, he guest-starred on Nash Bridges as a policeman whose teenage daughter had run amok and gone on a crime spree with her sociopathic boyfriend. In 2002, Frey appeared on HBO's Arliss, playing a political candidate who double-crosses Arliss and must pay a high price for it.

Frey's first foray into film was his starring role in Let's Get Harry, a 1986 film about a group of plumbers who travel to Colombia to rescue a friend from a drug lord. Frey's next film appearance was a smaller role in Cameron Crowe's third film, Jerry Maguire (1996). Frey played the frugal general manager of the Arizona Cardinals football team who, in the film's climax, finally agrees to award Cuba Gooding Jr.'s character, wide receiver Rod Tidwell, a large professional contract.

== Equipment ==
Takamine Guitars manufactures a Glenn Frey signature acoustic-electric guitar, the EF360GF. It is designed to replicate the Takamine Frey used for his live and studio applications. In the 1970s, Frey used Martin acoustic guitars in both six- and 12-string versions.

Frey played assorted electric guitars over the years, namely Fender Telecaster, Gibson Les Paul, Gibson SG, Gibson ES-330, Epiphone Casino and Rickenbacker 230, but the electric guitar that is most associated with him was his black Gibson Les Paul Junior, nicknamed Old Black.

== Personal life ==
Frey was married twice. From 1983 to 1988, he was married to artist Janie Beggs. Frey married dancer and choreographer Cindy Millican in 1990. They had three children: Taylor (born 1991), Deacon (born 1993), and Otis (born 2002), and remained together until his death. Deacon, following his father's death, toured with the surviving Eagles until he departed in 2022 in favor of a solo career. Deacon rejoined the Eagles in 2023.

== Illness and death ==
Frey was diagnosed with rheumatoid arthritis in 2000, which affected his joints. The medication that he was prescribed to control the disease eventually led to colitis and pneumonia. In November 2015, the Eagles announced that they were postponing their appearance at the Kennedy Center Honors because Frey required surgery for intestinal problems and needed a lengthy recovery period. Because of complications from pneumonia, he never had the surgery and was placed in a medically induced coma at Columbia University Irving Medical Center. Frey died there on January 18, 2016, at age 67, from complications of rheumatoid arthritis, acute ulcerative colitis, and pneumonia. Some medications for rheumatoid arthritis or ulcerative colitis are immune suppressants and can compromise the immune system's ability to fight off pneumonia. In January 2018, Frey's widow filed a suit against Mount Sinai Hospital and gastroenterologist Steven Itzkowitz for the wrongful death of Frey.

Frey was publicly mourned by his friends, fellow musicians, and bandmates, including Don Henley, Randy Meisner, JD Souther, Jack Tempchin, Irving Azoff, Linda Ronstadt, Don Felder, Joe Walsh, and Bob Seger. A life-sized statue of Frey was unveiled at the Standin' on the Corner Park in Winslow, Arizona, on September 24, 2016, to honor his songwriting contributions to "Take It Easy". The song was the Eagles' first single in 1972, with Frey its lead vocalist. At the 58th Annual Grammy Awards, the remaining members of the Eagles and Jackson Browne performed "Take It Easy" in his honor. The road running next to the high school (now a middle school) that Frey attended in Royal Oak, Michigan, also bears his name.

== Discography ==
=== Studio albums ===
Title	Details	Peak chart positions						Certifications
Title	Details	US	AUS	CAN	SWE	SWI	UK	Certifications
No Fun Aloud	Release date: May 28, 1982; Label: Asylum	32	44	—	39	—	—	US: Gold
The Allnighter	Release date: June 19, 1984; Label: MCA	22	—	57	40	—	31	US: Gold
Soul Searchin'	Release date: August 15, 1988; Label: MCA	36	49	37	36	—	—	CAN: Gold
Strange Weather	Release date: June 23, 1992; Label: MCA	—	120	—	34	23	—	
After Hours	Release date: May 8, 2012; Label: Universal Music	116	—	—	—	—	92	
"—" denotes releases that did not chart

=== Live albums ===
Title	Details
Glenn Frey Live	Release date: July 2, 1993; Label: MCA

=== Compilation albums ===
Title	Details	Peak chart positions	
Title	Details	US	US Cat.
Solo Collection	Release date: March 28, 1995; Label: MCA	82	23
20th Century Masters – The Millennium Collection	Release date: September 19, 2000; Label: MCA	—	—
Above the Clouds: The Collection	Release date: May 11, 2018; Label: Geffen	—	—

=== Singles ===
Title	Year	Peak chart positions								Album
Title	Year	US	US Main.	US AC	AUS	CAN	CAN AC	NZ	UK	Album
"I Found Somebody"	1982	31	57	27	93	—	—	—	—	No Fun Aloud
"The One You Love"	1982	15	—	2	50	12	2	36	—	No Fun Aloud
"Don't Give Up"	1982	—	25	—	—	—	—	—	—	No Fun Aloud
"Partytown"	1982	—	5	—	—	—	—	—	—	No Fun Aloud
"All Those Lies"	1983	41	—	28	—	—	—	—	—	No Fun Aloud
"Sexy Girl"	1984	20	—	23	76	48	12	—	81	The Allnighter
"The Allnighter"	1984	54	—	—	—	—	—	—	—	The Allnighter
"The Heat Is On"	1984	2	4	—	2	8	—	22	12	Beverly Hills Cop (soundtrack)
"Smuggler's Blues"	1985	12	13	—	—	37	—	—	22	The Allnighter / Miami Vice (soundtrack)
"You Belong to the City"	1985	2	1	2	20	6	2	46	94	Miami Vice (soundtrack)
"True Love"	1988	13	15	2	49	2	—	—	84	Soul Searchin'
"Soul Searchin'"	1988	—	—	5	—	—	—	—	—	Soul Searchin'
"Livin' Right"	1989	90	—	22	—	—	—	—	—	Soul Searchin'
"Flip City"	1989	—	—	—	—	—	—	—	—	Ghostbusters II (soundtrack)
"Part of Me, Part of You"	1991	55	9	7	97	9	8	—	—	Strange Weather
"I've Got Mine"	1992	91	—	12	—	18	—	—	—	Strange Weather
"River of Dreams"	1992	—	—	27	137	57	34	—	—	Strange Weather
"Love in the 21st Century"	1993	—^{A}	—	—	—	—	—	—	—	Strange Weather
"This Way to Happiness"	1995	—	—	—	—	54	—	—	—	Solo Collection
"—" denotes releases that did not chart

- ^Note A The song reached No. 12 on the Bubbling Under Hot 100 chart.

=== Music videos ===
Video	Year
"I Found Somebody"	1982
"The One You Love"	1982
"The Heat Is On"	1984
"Sexy Girl"	1985
"Smuggler's Blues"	1985
"You Belong to the City"	1985
"True Love"	1988
"Soul Searchin'"	1988
"Livin' Right"	1989
"Part of Me, Part of You"	1991
"I've Got Mine"	1992
"River of Dreams"	1992
"Route 66"	2012
"The Shadow of Your Smile"	2012
