= Elliot Scheiner =

Recording Engineer/Producer (born 1947)

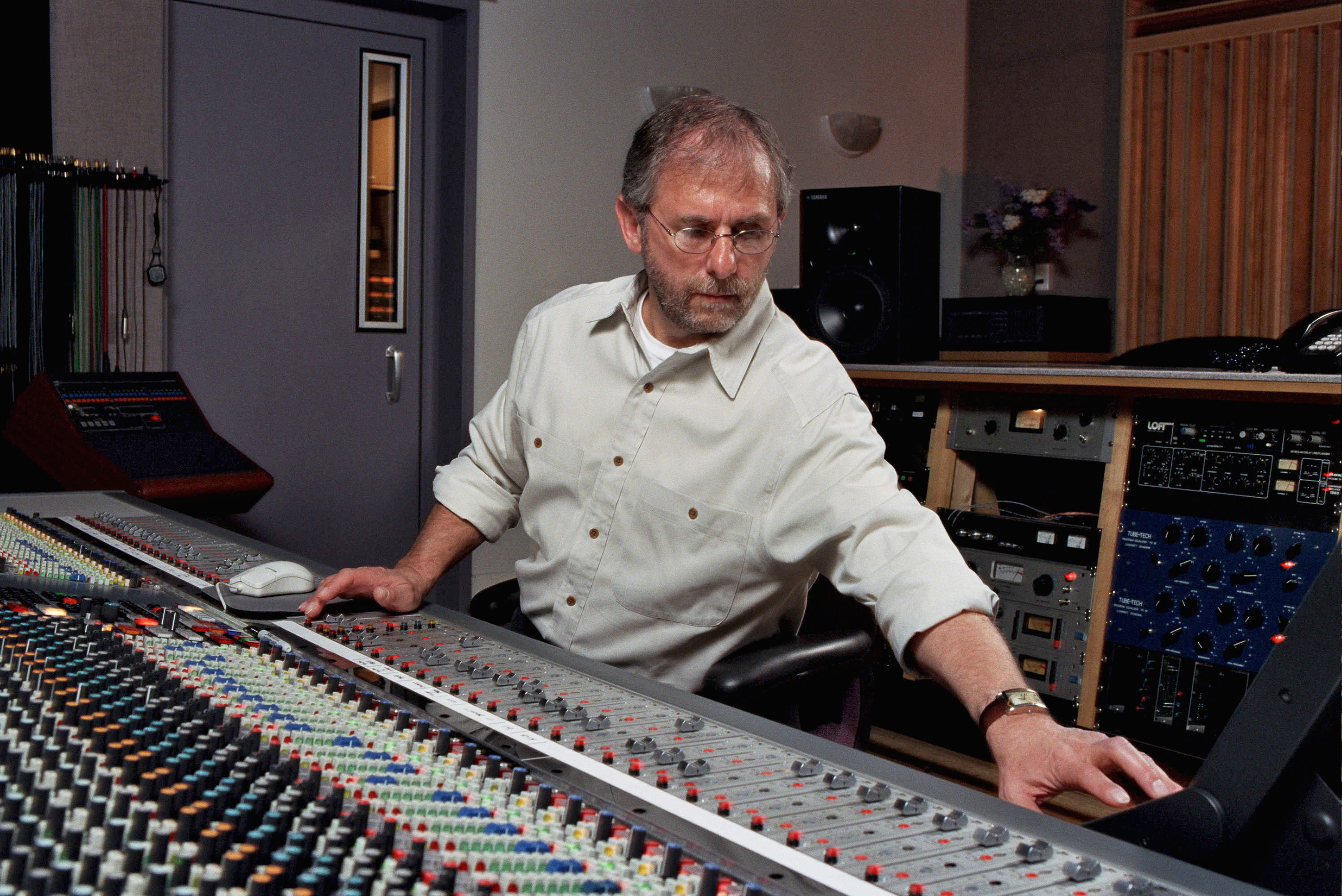
- Scheiner mixing in 2003
- Born: Elliot Ray Scheiner; March 18, 1947 (age 78)
- Occupation(s): Record producer, audio engineer
- Spouse: Diana Canova (m. 1985)

Elliot Ray Scheiner (born March 18, 1947) is a music producer, mixer and engineer. Scheiner has received 27 Grammy Award nominations (winning eight), four Emmy nominations (winning two Emmy Awards for his work with the Eagles on their farewell tour broadcast, and the documentary film History of the Eagles), three TEC Awards nominations, a TEC Hall of Fame inductee, and was a recipient of the Surround Pioneer Award.

He holds an honorary Doctor of Music degree from the Berklee College of Music and is one of the few Americans to be awarded the Master of Sound honour from the Japan Audio Society.

== Career ==
Scheiner began his career in 1967 as Phil Ramone's assistant at A & R Recording in New York City, and quickly advanced to engineer. By 1973, he had begun to freelance as an engineer and producer.

He produced and engineered a range of artists, including Foo Fighters, Toto, Jimmy Buffett, Beck, Faith Hill, Steely Dan, Band of Horses, Ricky Martin, Sting, Bruce Hornsby, Paul Simon, R.E.M., B.B. King, George Benson, Chaka Khan, Van Morrison, Donald Fagen, Fleetwood Mac, Queen, Eric Clapton, Jackson Browne, Eagles, Aerosmith, Joe Jackson, and Glenn Frey.

=== Mixing ===
Scheiner was nominated in 2005 for an Emmy Award for Outstanding Sound Mixing for a Variety or Music Series or Special or Animation, for his mixing for Eric Clapton in Great Performances; Eric Clapton Crossroads Guitar Festival (1972).

He mixed the IMAX film All Access: Front Row. Backstage. Live! (2001) in surround sound.

Scheiner did the 5.1 surround sound mix of Roy Orbison's Black & White Night concert DVD and Porcupine Tree's In Absentia. He mixed The Eagles' four-hour documentary, History of the Eagles (2013). He also mixed Beck's reinterpretation of the David Bowie hit "Sound and Vision." Scheiner also recorded and mixed Eric Clapton's Crossroads 2013 featuring Eric Clapton and friends at Madison Square Garden in New York City in April 2013.

In 2018, Phish released The Complete Baker's Dozen Box Set, with complete recordings of the 13-night concert run remixed by Scheiner.

=== Car audio ===
Scheiner also collaborated with Panasonic to create the ELS Surround premium audio system for Acura's RL/RLX, TL/TLX, ILX, TSX, RDX, MDX & ZDX. The audio system received rave reviews from the automotive press, audiophiles and musicians since it was introduced on the 2004 Acura TL. In 2018, Acura debuted ELS Studio 3D in the 2019 Acura RDX. The flagship system consists of 16 speakers, including 4 overhead speakers in the roof. ELS Studio 3D was most recently awarded Business Insider's "Car Audio System of the Year".

Scheiner once used the car to share a 5.1 mix with the Foo Fighters. "I sent them the mix, and they listened in the car. The first call back was, "Sounds great, don't change anything". They listened to the entire record in 5.1 in the car. So, it became not only a system for people who wanted to hear this kind of music, but for producers and artists to actually approve things. That's what I wanted. I wanted to take on the 5.1 market in cars and really do it big".
