= Jack Tempchin =

American musician and singer-songwriter

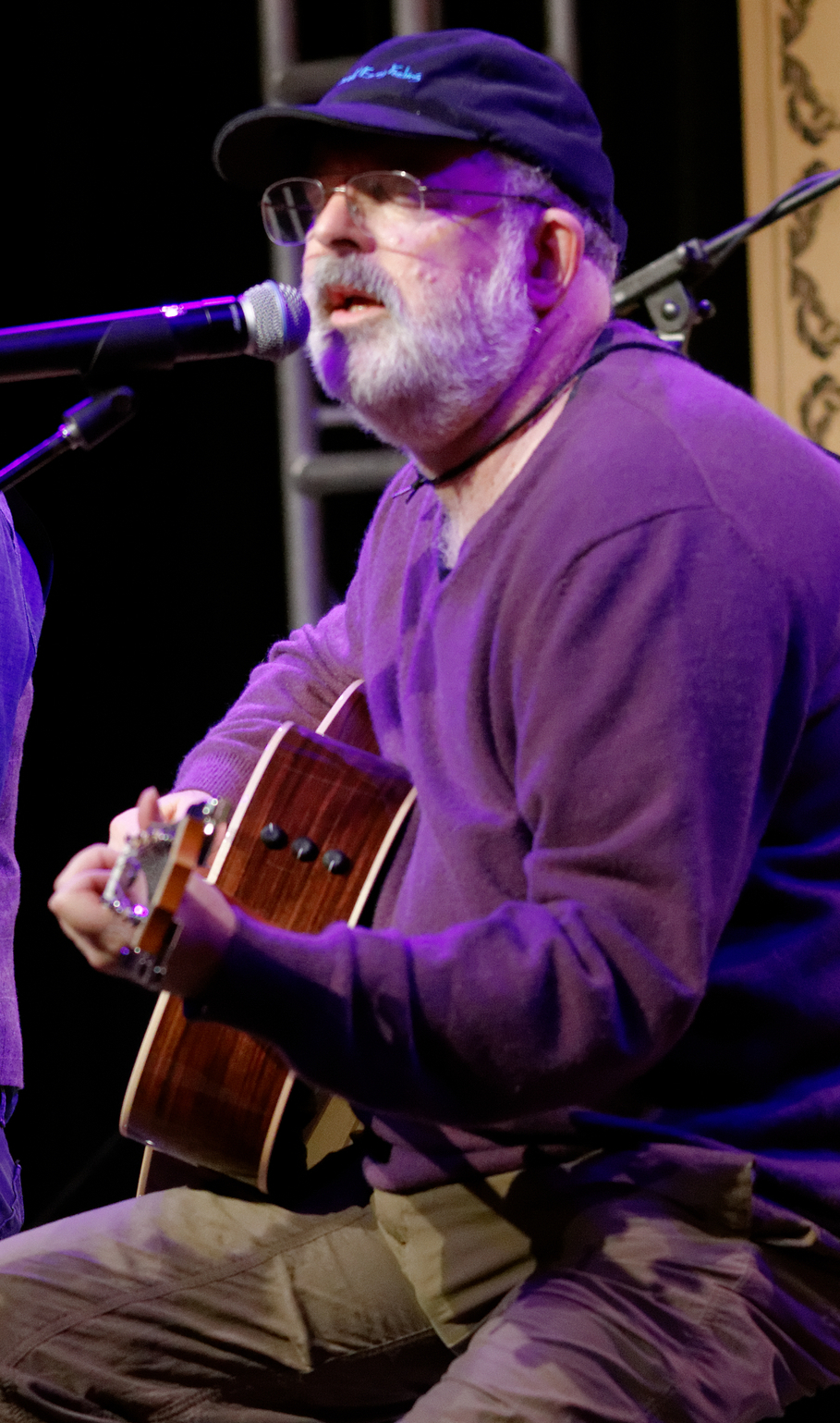
- Tempchin performing at the Taylor Guitars showroom stage in Anaheim, California, 2014

Background information
- Born: Ohio, U.S.
- Occupations: Musician; singer; songwriter
- Instruments: Guitar; piano; harmonica; vocals; whistling
- Years active: 1976–present

Jack Tempchin is an American musician and singer-songwriter who wrote the Eagles song "Peaceful Easy Feeling" and co-wrote "Already Gone", "The Girl from Yesterday", "Somebody" and "It's Your World Now".

== Early life ==
Jack Tempchin was born in rural Ohio. His family moved to San Diego, California when he was 9 months old near Balboa Park. His father was an aspiring baseball player who moved the family to the city after World War II to be a milkman.

Tempchin always enjoyed music. He wasn't an outside kid, instead reading books about music. But when outside, he would make music. Jack was a whistler as a boy, whistling every song he could think of when walking around the city. He later learned the harmonica and did the same thing, learning every song he could while walking. Around this time, he also tried songwriting, whistling and playing the harmonica to write music.

Tempchin and fellow Eagles bandmate Glenn Frey became friends in 1972 before both became famous, when Frey was visiting San Diego.

== Career ==
At ages 18 - 20, Tempchin learned the acoustic guitar and piano, and started performing solo with his guitar, harmonica, and singing.

During the Eagles' breakup period (1980–1994) he co-wrote with Glenn Frey producing "You Belong to the City", "Smuggler's Blues", "The One You Love", "I Found Somebody", "Sexy Girl" and "True Love".

Tempchin wrote "Slow Dancing". The song was first recorded in 1976 by the short-lived group Funky Kings, of which Tempchin and Jules Shear were members at the time. In 1977, the song became a top-10 pop hit for Johnny Rivers titled as "Swayin' to the Music (Slow Dancing)", and in 1979 it was a top-10 country hit for Johnny Duncan.

Tempchin has also toured extensively as a solo artist over the years, opening for Ringo Starr, Jackson Browne, Dave Mason, Poco, Dolly Parton, Karla Bonoff, Chicago, Christopher Cross, Kenny Loggins, Timothy B. Schmit, Barry McGuire, Tom Rush, Al Kooper and Emmylou Harris.

Tempchin was voted into the Songwriters Hall of Fame in 2019. In 2024, filmmaker and fellow-songwriter Gregory Page released a feature-length experimental documentary, Midnight Jack: The Movie, which features music, comedy and philosophy from Tempchin.

Other compositions include:

- "Someone That You Used to Know" (George Jones)
- "White Shoes" (Emmylou Harris, Randy Meisner)
- "Rollin'" (Glen Campbell)
- "To Feel That Way at All" (Patty Loveless)
- "Somebody Trying to Tell You Something" (Tanya Tucker)
- "You Can Go Home" (with Chris Hillman, recorded by The Desert Rose Band in 1991)
- "Your Tattoo" (Sammy Kershaw)
- "East of Eden" (Tom Rush)
- "15 Days Under the Hood" (Jack Tempchin, The Paladins, New Riders of the Purple Sage)
- "Who's Been Sleeping in My Bed" (Phantom Blues Band, Candye Kane)
- "Swayin' to the Music (Slow Dancing)" (Funky Kings (as "Slow Dancing", Johnny Rivers, Olivia Newton-John, Ian Gomm and Johnny Duncan)

== Discography ==
=== with The Funky Kings ===
- 1976 The Funky Kings

=== Solo albums ===
- 1978 Jack Tempchin
- 1994 After the Rain
- 1995 Lonely Midnight
- 1997 Best of Jack Tempchin (includes newly recorded versions of "Already Gone" and "Peaceful Easy Feeling" )
- 2000 Live on Hwy 101
- 2004 Staying Home
- 2007 Songs
- 2012 Live at Tales from the Tavern
- 2015 Learning to Dance
- 2016 One More Song
- 2017 Peaceful Easy Feeling – The Songs of Jack Tempchin
- 2019 One More Time with Feeling
- 2024 More Of Less
- 2025 All Kinds of Love
- 2025 The Magic Mirror
