= Randy Meisner (disambiguation) =

Randy Meisner is an American musician and songwriter. It is also the title of two eponymous albums:

- Randy Meisner (1978 album)
- Randy Meisner (1982 album)
