= Tequila Sunrise (Eagles song) =

Single by Eagles

from the album Desperado
- B-side: "Twenty-One"
- Released: April 17, 1973
- Genre: Soft rock; folk rock
- Length: 2:52
- Label: Asylum
- Songwriters: Don Henley; Glenn Frey
- Producers: Glyn Johns; Eagles

Eagles singles chronology
"Peaceful Easy Feeling" (1972)	"Tequila Sunrise" (1973)	"Outlaw Man" (1973)

"Tequila Sunrise" is a song from 1973, written by Don Henley and Glenn Frey, and recorded by the Eagles. It was the first single from the band's second album, Desperado. It peaked at number 64 on the Billboard Hot 100.

A cover version was recorded by country music singer Alan Jackson on the 1993 tribute album Common Thread: The Songs of the Eagles. It reached number 64 on the Billboard Hot Country Singles & Tracks chart.

== Background ==
Glenn Frey and Don Henley did not write songs together for their debut album, Eagles, but after they had finished recording the album in London, they decided that they should collaborate. In the first week of their partnership, they wrote "Tequila Sunrise" and "Desperado". According to Frey, the song was finished fairly quickly. He said he was lying on a couch playing the guitar, and came up with a guitar riff he described as "kinda Roy Orbison, kinda Mexican". He demonstrated it for Henley and said: "Maybe we should write something to this."

The title refers to a cocktail named Tequila Sunrise that was then popular. In the liner notes of 2003's The Very Best Of, Henley had this to say about the song title:

I believe that was a Glenn title. I think he was ambivalent about it because he thought that it was a bit too obvious or too much of a cliché because of the drink that was so popular then. I said, 'No – look at it from a different point of view. You've been drinking straight tequila all night and the sun is coming up!' It turned out to be a really great song.

According to Billboard, the theme of the song is " one man's efforts at survival and having to take 'a shot of courage.'" Cash Box called it "a magnificent medium tempo tune certain to become a classic" that is "highlighted by some excellent vocal harmonies." Record World called it a "beautiful folk rock item with the pedal steel country feel."

Henley said that Frey came up with changes for the bridge, and that "take another shot of courage" refers to tequila being known as "instant courage." He said: "We very much wanted to talk to the ladies, but we often didn’t have the nerve, so we'd drink a couple of shots and suddenly it was, "Howdy, ma'am.""

During a live version of this song, recorded for ABC In Concert in 1973, Glenn Frey sings an additional verse: "Guess I'll go to Mexico, down to where the pace of life is slow, there's no one there I know. It's another Tequila Sunrise, wondering if I'm growing wise or telling lies." During their appearance at Popgala '73 in Voorburg, Netherlands, in March 1973, the additional verse has slightly different wording: “Think I'll go to Mexico, down to where the pace is nice and slow ...”. The extra verse was also performed in later concerts, including a November 1976 performance in Houston.

Ultimate Classic Rock critic Sterling Whitaker rated it as the Eagles 7th most underrated song, praising Bernie Leadon's guitar and mandolin playing as well as Frey's vocal performance.

== Personnel ==
Eagles

- Glenn Frey – lead vocals, acoustic guitar
- Don Henley – drums, maracas, backing vocals
- Randy Meisner – bass, backing vocals
- Bernie Leadon – B-Bender electric guitar, acoustic guitar solos, backing vocals

== Charts ==
Chart (1975)	Peak position
Canada Top Singles (RPM)	68
Canada Adult Contemporary (RPM)	81
US Billboard Hot 100	64
US Adult Contemporary (Billboard)	26

== Certifications ==
Region	Certification	Certified units/sales
United Kingdom (BPI)	Silver	200,000^{‡}
^{‡} Sales+streaming figures based on certification alone.
