= Nice Baby and the Angel =

Studio album by David Blue
- Released: 1973
- Genre: Singer-songwriter, country rock
- Length: 35:00
- Label: Asylum

Nice Baby and the Angel is a 1973 album by American singer-songwriter David Blue. It was released by Asylum Records and produced by Graham Nash. The album was Blue's second release on Asylum Records.

== History ==
Nice Baby and the Angel was recorded in collaboration with Dave Mason, David Lindley, and Glenn Frey. The album features backing vocals from Nash and Jennifer Warnes on the track "Lady O' Lady". The album is a departure from Blue's folk style with more country, singer-songwriter oriented tracks.

The album was released in mid-1973 to a mediocre response. It did not chart, neither did one of the singles released. However, "True to You/Dancing Girl" and "Outlaw Man/Troubadour Song" managed to reach #94 on the BILLBOARD Hot 100. "Outlaw Man" was picked up by Glenn Frey, who introduced it to the Eagles. This led to the band including it on their second album, Desperado.

== Track listing ==
All tracks are written by David Blue.

| No. | Title | Length |
|---|---|---|
| 1. | "Outlaw Man" | 2:49 |
| 2. | "Lady O' Lady" | 3:15 |
| 3. | "True to You" | 3:36 |
| 4. | "On Sunday, Any Sunday" | 3:41 |
| 5. | "Darlin' Jenny" | 3:50 |
| 6. | "Dancing Girl" | 2:44 |
| 7. | "Yesterday's Lady" | 4:31 |
| 8. | "Nice Baby and the Angel" | 3:03 |
| 9. | "Troubadour Song" | 3:41 |
| 10. | "Train to Anaheim" | 3:27 |

== Reception ==
Professional ratings
Review scores
| Source | Rating |
|---|---|
| AllMusic | 4/5 stars |
| Robert Christgau | C- |

Initial reception of Nice Baby and the Angel was mixed. In late April 1973, Billboard praised Blue as a "veteran singer-songwriter", and selected "Outlaw Man", the title track, and "Dancing Girl", as the best cuts on the album. Robert Christgau was more critical, giving the album a C− and calling it "outtakes from the Eagles".

In a retrospective review for AllMusic, William Ruhlmann commented on Nash and Lindley's contributions to the album positively, while noting that Blue's lyrical content was starting to wane.

== Aftermath ==
Nice Baby and the Angel failed to chart. Blue released two further albums, both on Asylum. Com'n Back For More was released in 1975. Bob Dylan, Don Felder, Joni Mitchell, and members from the band America contributed to the album, even though it was a commercial and critical failure.
