= Evening of Light =

Song by Nico

from the album The Marble Index
- Language: English
- Released: 1968
- Recorded: Autumn of 1968
- Genre: Avant-folk, proto-goth
- Label: Elektra
- Songwriter: Nico
- Producers: Frazier Mohawk, John Cale

Nico singles chronology
"These Days" (1967)	"Evening of Light" (1968)

"Evening of Light" is a 1968 song recorded by Nico from her second studio album, The Marble Index (1968). The song was written by Nico and produced by John Cale and Frazier Mohawk.

== Music video ==
The music video for "Evening of Light" was filmed by François De Menil, and released in 1969. A 21-year-old Iggy Pop appears in the video frolicking around in white mime facepaint, whom Nico met through John Cale who was producing his band, The Stooges' first studio album in New York. At this time, Nico was having a brief affair with Iggy Pop, which Iggy once revealed to a French interviewer that Nico taught him how to “eat pussy.” The video was shot in a snowy field behind Iggy's house in his hometown, Ann Arbor, Michigan. Richard Witts, author of Nico's biography, Nico: The Life and Lies of an Icon, tells the tale that De Menil seemed to want to get revenge on Iggy because he was Nico's boyfriend, directing the Stooge to wear white mime makeup and frolic around in a doll-strewn field to try to embarrass him.

== Critical reception ==
Matthew Barton of the Record Collector Magazine, who gave the song's album a positive review, described "Evening of Light" as a "grandiose building fog of harpsichord, glockenspiel, and Rosemary's Baby shrieks, Nico's voice an unmovable, impenetrable siren call amid a gathering tornado. It's as if the 'midnight winds'" she describes are gathering everything up in their wake, until, finally, a void."

== Personnel ==
- Nico – vocals, harmonium
- John Cale – viola, glockenspiel, harpsichord, Hagstrom H8, timpani

=== Producers ===
- Frazier Mohawk – producer
- John Cale – producer
