= Witchy Woman =

Single by Eagles

from the album Eagles
- B-side: "Early Bird"
- Released: August 1, 1972
- Recorded: 1972
- Studio: Olympic Sound Studios (London, England)
- Genre: Rock; folk rock
- Length: 4:14
- Label: Asylum
- Songwriters: Don Henley; Bernie Leadon
- Producer: Glyn Johns

Eagles singles chronology
"Take It Easy" (1972)	"Witchy Woman" (1972)	"Peaceful Easy Feeling" (1972)

"Witchy Woman" is a song written by Don Henley and Bernie Leadon, and recorded by the American rock band Eagles. Released as the second single from the band's debut studio album, Eagles (1972), it reached No. 9 on the Billboard pop singles chart.

== Background and writing ==
Guitarist Bernie Leadon started writing "Witchy Woman" whilst he was still a member of the country rock band the Flying Burrito Brothers. After joining the Eagles, Leadon and Don Henley then finished the song together, and it would be the only song on the Eagles' debut album where Henley had a writing credit. The song was conceived while Don Henley was living in an old house near the Hollywood Bowl, with his flat mate, Henry Vine (aka 'Blitz'). Henley said of the origin of the song: "[Leadon] came over one day and started playing this strange, minor-key riff that sounded sort of like a Hollywood movie version of Indian music — you know, the kind of stuff they play when the Indians ride up on the ridge while the wagon train passes below. It had a haunting quality, and I thought it was interesting, so we put a rough version of it down on a cassette tape." Henley also gave the song an R&B pulse in its music.

The inspiration for the title and lyrics about a seductive enchantress came from a number of women, although Henley had one particular woman in mind – Zelda Fitzgerald, whose biography he was reading while writing the song. According to Henley, he was suffering from flu with a very high fever and become semi-delirious, and every time the fever subsided, he would continue to read a book on the life of Zelda Fitzgerald, and the character in the song would be a mix of Zelda Fitzgerald "along with amorphous images of girls [he] had met at the Whisky and the Troubadour". Zelda, the muse behind her husband F. Scott Fitzgerald, was known as a wild, bewitching and mesmerizing "Flapper" of the Jazz Age and the Roaring Twenties, and is sometimes thought to be the model for the character of Daisy Buchanan in his novel, The Great Gatsby (1925). In "Witchy Woman", the line "She drove herself to madness with the silver spoon" may be a reference to Zelda's time in a mental institution and the special slotted silver absinthe spoon used to dissolve sugar cubes with absinthe, the popular 1920s alcoholic beverage distilled from the wormwood tree and called "the green fairy" for sometimes inducing hallucinations.

According to Henley, other influences for the song include books by Carlos Castaneda on shamanism and a girl he knew who was interested in the occult.

== Critical reception ==
The song is the first commercially successful one Henley wrote, reaching No. 9 on the Billboard Hot 100 chart. He called it "[a]n important song for me, because it marked the beginning of my professional songwriting career". Billboard described it as "a strong easy beat slow rock ballad". Cashbox described it as being "midway between Redbone and CSN&Y" with "distinctive harmony power." Record World said that "a tom-tom back beat and an eery touch of hoodoo blend to spell out a smash."

== Performances ==
"Witchy Woman" is one of the earliest songs written by the Eagles, and together with "Take It Easy" it was also one of the very few songs the band performed every night in their early days. In one of their earliest public appearances as the Eagles, they performed "Witchy Woman" repeatedly at the opening of an art show in Venice, Los Angeles in 1972 of works by Boyd Elder, who would later also create the painted skulls that appear in some of Eagles' albums covers.

== In popular culture ==
The song, along with "Desperado", were both used and referred to in an episode of the sitcom Seinfeld. In an episode of Dharma & Greg from the first season, Abbey, Dharma's mother, mentions that she dated Henley and is almost certain she is Witchy Woman. The song was used in a 2005 episode of the series Cold Case titled "In the Woods" (the episode was set during 1972, the year of the song's original release). It is also used in the 2001 movie America's Sweethearts to depict Catherine Zeta-Jones' character as she is getting out of a limousine.

== Charts ==
Chart (1972)	Peak position
Canada Top Singles (RPM)	8
Netherlands (Single Top 100)	26
US Billboard Hot 100	9

== Personnel ==
Eagles

- Don Henley – lead vocals; drums
- Glenn Frey – backing vocals; lead guitar
- Bernie Leadon – backing vocals; rhythm guitar
- Randy Meisner – bass guitar; backing vocals
