= The Poor (American band) =

American rock band

Background information
- Origin: Los Angeles, California, United States
- Genres: Garage rock; folk rock; psychedelic rock
- Years active: 1966-1968
- Labels: Loma, York, Decca

The Poor were an American rock band from Los Angeles, California who were active in the 1960s. Included in their roster were Randy Meisner, who went go on to achieve fame with the Eagles and Poco in the 1970s, as well as Allen Kemp and Pat Shanahan, who later joined New Riders of the Purple Sage.

== History ==
The Poor formed out of the remnants of the Soul Survivors, a garage rock group from Denver Colorado (not to be confused with the Philadelphia group), who had recorded several singles in 1965 and 1966. Allen Kemp, Pat Shanahan and John Day had been in the Soul Survivors. They moved to Los Angeles, California and when upon arriving teamed up with Randy Meisner, previously of the Esquires and later to gain fame in the Eagles and Poco, and Randy Naylor to form the Poor. They were able to sign under the management of Charlie Green and Brian Stone, who handled Sonny & Cher and Buffalo Springfield.

They cut their debut single, "How Many Tears" b/w "Once Again," which was released on the Loma label in October, 1966 and was produced by Barry Friedman, who had worked with Buffalo Springfield and Paul Butterfield. Freidman produced their next two singles, including their follow-up "She's Got the Time, She's Got the Changes," written by Tom Shipley and Michael Brewer, b/w "Love is Real" and "My Mind Goes High" b/w "Knowing You, Loving You," which both were released on the York label in 1967. None of their records received much airplay except "She's Got the Time, She's Got the Changes," which became a minor hit reaching #133 in the charts and has been described by music writer Bruce Eder as "...showing real garage punk attitude as well as a ton of virtuosity and style..." In May 1968, the group released a single on Decca Records "Feelin' Down" b/w "Come Back Baby," but it failed to chart. The group broke up shortly thereafter.

Following the breakup of the Poor, Randy Meisner went on to join country rock band Poco, appearing on their first album “Pickin’ Up the Pieces”, before departing the band prior to that album's release. After Meisner's departure from Poco, he, Kemp, and Shanahan played in Rick Nelson's backing group, the Stone Canyon Band. Kemp and Shanahan later joined New Riders of the Purple Sage. Meisner then became one of the founding members of popular 1970s rock group the Eagles. Day joined the short-lived group Two Guitars, Piano, Drum and Darryl. All of the Poor's singles were compiled on the 2003 CD compilation The Poor, which also includes the two singles by the Soul Survivors. The Group's complete recordings are included on the Sonic Past Music anthology, Help the Poor: The Complete Recordings of the Poor Featuring Randy Meisner.

== Discography ==
- "How Many Tears" b/w "Once Again" (Loma 2062, October 1966)
- "She's Got the Time, She's Got the Changes" b/w "Love is Real" (York 402, 1967)
- "My Mind Goes High" b/w "Knowing You, Loving You" (York 404, April 1967)
- "Feelin' Down" b/w "Come Back Baby" (Decca, May 1968)
