= Desperado (Eagles song) =

1973 song by the Eagles

Song by Eagles

from the album Desperado
- Released: April 17, 1973
- Recorded: Early 1973
- Studio: Island Studios (London, England)
- Genre: Rock; soft rock; folk rock
- Length: 3:33
- Label: Asylum
- Songwriters: Glenn Frey; Don Henley
- Producer: Glyn Johns

Audio sample
- Vocal and piano intro: file; help

"Desperado" is a ballad by the American band the Eagles. The track was written by Glenn Frey and Don Henley, and appeared on the band's second studio album Desperado (1973) as well as numerous compilation albums. Although it was never released as a single, it became one of Eagles' best-known songs. It ranked No. 494 on Rolling Stone's 2004 list of "The 500 Greatest Songs of All Time".

== Composition ==
According to Henley, "Desperado" was based on a song he started in 1968, written in the style of old songs by Stephen Foster. The song was originally about a friend named Leo and with the opening line "Leo, my God, why don't you come to your senses..." In 1972, after they had recorded their debut studio album, Eagles, in London, Glenn Frey and Henley decided that they should write songs together, and within a day or two after returning from London they wrote "Desperado". They also wrote "Tequila Sunrise" in the first week of their collaboration.

The piano introduction of the song is taken from Ray Charles' version of "Georgia On My Mind", which plays the same introduction on strings. In their first songwriting session at Henley's home in Laurel Canyon, Los Angeles, Henley played Frey the unfinished version of the song, and said: "When I play it and sing it, I think of Ray Charles and Stephen Foster. It's really a Southern Gothic thing, but we can easily make it more Western." According to Henley, Frey "leapt right on it – filled in the blanks and brought structure", and the song became "Desperado". Henley added: "And that was the beginning of our songwriting partnership ... that's when we became a team."

== Recording ==
The song was recorded at Island Studios in London, with musicians from the London Philharmonic Orchestra. The orchestra was conducted by Jim Ed Norman, Henley's friend from his former band Shiloh, who also wrote and arranged the strings for the song. According to Henley, he was given only four or five takes to record the song by the producer Glyn Johns who wanted to record the album quickly and economically. Henley felt intimidated by the large orchestra, and would later express regret that he did not sing as well as he could. He said: "I didn't sing my best ... I wish I could have done that song again."

== Critical reception ==
"Desperado" is one of Eagles' most well-known songs, and it was ranked No. 494 on the Rolling Stone's list of "The 500 Greatest Songs of All Time" in 2004. It was voted the second-most-favorite Eagles song in a poll of Rolling Stone readers. In 2000, the song was included in MOJO magazine's list of greatest songs, nominated by songwriters such as Paul McCartney, Hal David, and Brian Wilson. Members of the Western Writers of America included it in their list of the Top 100 Western songs of all time. In 2017, Billboard ranked the song number two on their list of the 15 greatest Eagles songs, and in 2019, Rolling Stone ranked the song number three on their list of the 40 greatest Eagles songs. In June 2026, CBS News included the song in its list of the 250 essential American songs of the past 250 years.

According to an interview with Don Henley, "Desperado" was not a hit for the Eagles until Linda Ronstadt recorded it.

William Ruhlmann of AllMusic considered it one of Eagles' major compositions. Paul Gambaccini of Rolling Stone felt it was Henley's rough voice that made the song memorable. The Eagles' recording never charted on Billboard until the death of Glenn Frey, when it reached No. 20 on the Rock Digital Songs chart. After the antagonist of the film Guardians of the Galaxy Vol. 2 (2017) claimed that "Brandy" by Looking Glass was "Earth's finest composition", that band's lead guitarist and songwriter Elliot Lurie countered that "Desperado" should have that title.

== Personnel ==
Eagles

- Don Henley – lead vocals; drums
- Glenn Frey – piano; backing vocals
- Bernie Leadon – electric guitar; backing vocals
- Randy Meisner – bass; backing vocals
- Jim Ed Norman – string arrangement
- London Philharmonic Orchestra

== Certifications and sales ==
Region	Certification	Certified units/sales
New Zealand (RMNZ)	Platinum	30,000^{‡}
United Kingdom (BPI)	Gold	400,000^{‡}
^{‡} Sales+streaming figures based on certification alone.

== Notable cover versions ==
- The Carpenters on their sixth studio album Horizon (1975).
- Linda Ronstadt on her fourth solo studio album Don't Cry Now (1973). Henley credited Ronstadt for popularizing the song with this early cover of the song, and described her version as "poignant, and beautiful".
- Johnny Rodriguez's version on his 1976 album Reflecting was released as a single, and reached No. 5 on both the Country Singles charts of Billboard in the United States and RPM in Canada.
- Clint Black on Eagles' tribute album Common Thread: The Songs of the Eagles. His rendition peaked at No. 54 on Hot Country Songs in 1993 in the US, and No. 52 on the Country chart in Canada.
- Diana Krall covered the song on her twelfth studio album Wallflower (2015) and it was released as a single in September 2014. The song debuted on Billboard's Jazz Digital Songs chart at No. 3.
- Alisan Porter performed the song as a competitor in the tenth season of The Voice TV series. Her version charted at No. 24 on Digital Songs.
- Miranda Lambert performed the song at the 2015 Kennedy Center Honors as a tribute to Eagles.

== In popular culture ==
The song inspired the title of the 1987 Western television film, Desperado, written by Elmore Leonard. In season 4 episode 2 of Succession the song is referenced. The song is also a plot device in the seventh episode of Seinfeld season 8.
