= Herbie Lovelle =

American drummer, studio musician, and actor (1924-2009)

- Born: Herbert Edward Lovelle; June 1, 1924; New York, U.S.
- Died: April 8, 2009 (aged 84) New York, U.S.
- Genres: Jazz, R&B, rock, folk
- Occupations: Musician, actor
- Instruments: Drums

Herbert Edward Lovelle (June 1, 1924 – April 8, 2009) was an American drummer, who played jazz, R&B, rock, and folk. He was also a studio musician and an actor.

== Biography ==
Lovelle was born in New York City. His uncle was the drummer Arthur Herbert.

Lovelle began his career with the trumpeter, singer, and band leader Hot Lips Page in the late 1940s, then played in the 1950s with the saxophonist Hal Singer, Johnny Moore's Three Blazers and the pianist Earl Hines. Through working for Lucky Thompson and Jimmy Rushing of Count Basie's Orchestra, he became house drummer at the Savoy Ballroom in New York City for much of the 1950s.

He toured with the tenor saxophonist Arnett Cobb and the pianist Teddy Wilson in 1954. In 1959, he contributed to the pianist Paul Curry's album, Paul Curry Presents the Friends of Fats, released on Golden Crest Records.

In the early years of television, he performed with the King Guion Orchestra on the Jerry Lester Show and the Ed Sullivan Show. In 1966, he was the lead drummer for Sammy Davis Jr.'s television show.

Lovelle began playing more R&B in the 1950s and worked as a studio musician, often with Sam Taylor. He played on albums by Bob Dylan (The Freewheelin' Bob Dylan), Pearls Before Swine, Eric Andersen, David Blue, John Denver, Tom Rush, B. B. King, John Martyn (Stormbringer!), the Strangeloves, the McCoys, and the Monkees. He continued working as a studio musician into the 1980s, when acting started to take over his time.

In 1974/75 he played in John Denver's band that was used for a series of ABC Specials called An Evening With John Denver.

In 1976, he produced the first album by Stuff, which went platinum in Japan. He also played the drums in the 1976 revival of Guys and Dolls.

From 1980, he acted in film and television, and his film credits included Bella (2006), Mitchellville (2004) (Sundance), Don't Explain (2002), The Curse of the Jade Scorpion (2001), Down to Earth (2001), Girlfight (2000), Maximum Risk (1996), Getting Away with Murder (1996), White Lies (1996), Bleeding Hearts (1994), The Paper (1994), Running on Empty (1988), Death Wish 3 (1985), and A Man Called Adam (1966).

His television credits include Into the Fire (2005), How Do You Spell Belief? (2005), Kingpin Rising (2005), Third Watch (two episodes, 2005), and Law & Order (four episodes, 1995–2004).

== Death ==
Lovelle died on April 8, 2009, in New York, at the age of 84.

== Filmography ==
=== Film ===
Year	Title	Role	Notes	Ref(s)
1966	A Man Called Adam	—N/a		
1985	Death Wish 3	—N/a		
1988	Running on Empty	Hospital Clerk		
1993	Cliffhanger	—N/a	The role in the 1993 film was not acted	
1994	The Paper	Victor		
1994	Bleeding Hearts	Janitor		
1996	Getting Away with Murder	Blind Man		
1996	Maximum Risk	Martin		
1997	White Lies	Fred the Bum		
2000	Girlfight	Cal	Independent film	
2001	Down to Earth	Trashman		
2001	The Curse of the Jade Scorpion	Night Guard		
2002	Don't Explain	Red		
2003	Rhythm of the Saints	JoJo		

=== Television ===
Year	Title	Role	Notes
1995-2004	Law & Order	Phil / Sam Wilton / Mr. Hemmerick / Luther	4 episodes
2004	Mitchellville	Ken Malik	Independent television movie
2005	Third Watch	Hiram	2 episodes
2005	Into the Fire	Arthur Jackson	Independent television movie Final television role

== Discography ==
With Eric Andersen

- 'Bout Changes 'n' Things Take 2 (Vanguard, 1967)
- Avalanche (Warner Bros., 1968)
- More Hits from Tin Can Alley (Vanguard, 1968)

With Solomon Burke

- I Wish I Knew (Atlantic, 1968)
- King Solomon (Atlantic, 1968)

With Cándido Camero

- Thousand Finger Man (Solid State, 1970)
- Beautiful (Blue Note, 1971)

With Buck Clayton

- Jazz Gallery (Philips, 1959)
- Songs for Swingers (Columbia, 1959)
- Copenhagen Concert (SteepleChase, 1979)

With John Denver

- Rhymes & Reasons (RCA Records, 1969)
- Take Me to Tomorrow (RCA Victor, 1970)
- Farewell Andromeda (RCA Victor, 1973)
- Rocky Mountain Christmas (RCA Records, 1975)

With Art Farmer

- Art Farmer Plays (Prestige, 1955)
- Early Art (New Jazz, 1961)
- Farmer's Market (Prestige, 1973)

With Lightning Hopkins

- Goin' Away (Prestige, 1963)
- Soul Blues (Prestige, 1963)
- Down Home Blues (Prestige, 1965)

With B. B. King

- Completely Well (Bluesway, 1969)
- Indianola Mississippi Seeds (ABC, 1970)

With Donal Leace

- Donal Leace (Atlantic Records, 1972)

With Herbie Mann

- The Herbie Mann String Album (Atlantic, 1967)
- Glory of Love (CTI, 1967)

With Sonny Stitt

- Soul Shack (Prestige, 1963)
- Primitivo Soul (Prestige, 1964)

With Rufus Thomas

- Crown the Prince of Dance (Stax, 1973)

With others

- Nat Adderley, Sayin' Somethin' (Atlantic, 1966)
- Tony Bennett, My Heart Sings (Columbia, 1961)
- Emmett Berry, Beauty and The Blues (Columbia, 1960)
- David Blue, David Blue (Elektra, 1966)
- Terence Boylan, Alias Boona (Verve Forecast, 1969)
- Ruth Brown, Black Is Brown and Brown Is Beautiful (Skye, 1969)
- Rusty Bryant, Rusty Bryant Returns (Prestige, 1969)
- Fats Domino, Fats Is Back (Reprise, 1968)
- Bob Dylan, The Freewheelin' Bob Dylan (Columbia, 1963)
- Dave Frishberg, Oklahoma Toad (CTI, 1970)
- Slim Gaillard, Mish Mash (Mercury, 1953)
- Erroll Garner, That's My Kick (MGM, 1967)
- Leonard Gaskin, At the Jazz Band Ball (Swingville, 1962)
- Lotti Golden, Motor-Cycle (Atlantic, 1969)
- Johnny Hodges, Blue Pyramid (Verve, 1966)
- Red Holloway, The Burner (Prestige, 1964)
- Richard "Groove" Holmes, That Healin' Feelin' (Prestige, 1968)
- Illinois Jacquet, Spectrum (Argo, 1965)
- Eddie Jefferson, Joe Carroll, Annie Ross, The Bebop Singers (Prestige, 1970)
- Big Joe Turner, Singing the Blues (BluesWay, 1967)
- Budd Johnson, Budd Johnson and the Four Brass Giants (Riverside, 1960)
- Barbara Lewis, It's Magic (Atlantic, 1966)
- Gordon Lightfoot, Did She Mention My Name? (United Artists, 1968)
- Wade Marcus, A New Era (Cotillion, 1971)
- John Martyn and Beverley Martyn, Stormbringer! (Island, 1970)
- Percy Mayfield, Blues and Then Some (RCA Victor, 1971)
- The Monkees, More of the Monkees (Colgems, 1967)
- The Monkees, Instant Replay (Colgems, 1969)
- The Monkees, Changes (Colgems, 1970)
- Melba Moore, This Is It (Buddah, 1976)
- Van Morrison, T.B. Sheets (Bang, 1973)
- Chico O'Farrill, Married Well (Verve, 1967)
- Esther Phillips, Esther Phillips Sings (Atlantic, 1966)
- Chuck Rainey, The Chuck Rainey Coalition (Skye, 1972)
- Tom Rapp, Beautiful Lies You Could Live In (Reprise, 1971)
- Tom Rush, The Circle Game (Elektra, 1968)
- Tom Rush, Tom Rush (Columbia, 1970)
- Evie Sands, Any Way That You Want Me (Rev-Ola, 1970)
- Marlena Shaw, From the Depths of My Soul (Blue Note, 1973)
- Ian & Sylvia, Ian & Sylvia (Columbia, 1971)
- Buddy Tate, Swinging Like Tate (Felsted, 1958)
- Howard Tate, Get It While You Can (Verve, 1967)
- Leon Thomas, Full Circle (Flying Dutchman, 1973)
- Muddy Waters, The London Muddy Waters Sessions (Chess, 1972)
- Dicky Wells, Trombone Four-in-Hand (Felsted, 1959)
- Ernie Wilkins, Screaming Mothers (Mainstream, 1974)
- Cris Williamson, Cris Williamson (Ampex, 1971)
- Jimmy Witherspoon, Blues Around the Clock (Prestige, 1964)
