= The Frozen Borderline – 1968–1970 =

Compilation album by Nico
- Released: 2007
- Recorded: 1968–1970
- Genre: Avant-rock
- Length: 143:10
- Label: Rhino
- Producer: Andy Zax

Nico chronology
Le Bataclan '72 (2004)	The Frozen Borderline – 1968–1970 (2007)	Live at the Hacienda '83 (2022)

Professional ratings
Review scores
Source	Rating
AllMusic	4.5/5 stars
Pitchfork	9.2/10
Uncut	5/5 stars

The Frozen Borderline – 1968–1970 is a compilation album by German musician Nico, released in 2007 by record label Rhino. The album comprises remastered versions of her studio albums The Marble Index (1968) and Desertshore (1970), along with early/alternate versions of several tracks and two previously unknown tracks.

== Track listing ==
=== The Marble Index ===
Tracks 1 to 8 are remastered versions of the songs from The Marble Index. Track 9 and 10 are two previously unknown songs. Track 11 and 12 are alternate versions of the two bonus tracks from the 1990 CD release of The Marble Index. Track 13 to 19 are early versions of the songs.

Original album
No.	Title	Length
1.	"Prelude"	0:59
2.	"Lawns of Dawns"	3:10
3.	"No One Is There"	3:36
4.	"Ari's Song"	3:20
5.	"Facing the Wind"	4:58
6.	"Julius Caesar (Memento Hodie)"	5:01
7.	"Frozen Warnings"	4:01
8.	"Evening of Light"	5:44
Total length:		30:49

Outtakes
No.	Title	Length
9.	"Sagen Die Gelehrten"	3:52
10.	"Rêve Réveiller"	4:07
11.	"Roses in the Snow" (alternate version)	4:00
12.	"Nibelungen" (complete version)	3:15
Total length:		15:14

Alternate versions
No.	Title	Length
13.	"Lawns of Dawns"	3:15
14.	"No One Is There"	3:40
15.	"Ari's Song"	3:14
16.	"Facing the Wind"	5:05
17.	"Julius Caesar (Memento Hodie)"	5:02
18.	"Frozen Warnings"	4:21
19.	"Evening of Light"	5:41
Total length:		30:18

=== Desertshore ===
Tracks 1 to 8 are remastered versions of the songs from Desertshore. Track 9 to 14 are early versions of the songs. Track 14 contains a hidden 15th track that starts after ten minutes of silence.

Original album
No.	Title	Length
1.	"Janitor of Lunacy"	4:04
2.	"The Falconer"	5:42
3.	"My Only Child"	3:30
4.	"Le Petit Chevalier"	1:17
5.	"Abschied"	3:05
6.	"Afraid"	3:30
7.	"Mütterlein"	4:40
8.	"All That Is My Own"	3:36
Total length:		29:24

Demos
No.	Title	Length
9.	"My Only Child"	4:15
10.	"Janitor of Lunacy"	3:58
11.	"Abschied Ode (Death/Farewell)"	3:01
12.	"You Are Beautiful (Afraid)"	3:17
13.	"The Falconer"	5:46
14.	"On the Desert Shore (All That Is My Own)" (ends at 2:44) "Frozen Warnings" (hidden track, starts at 12:44)	17:08
Total length:		37:25

== Chart performance ==
Chart (2007)	Peak position
UK Albums Chart	128
