= One More Song =

Studio album by Randy Meisner
- Released: October 1980
- Recorded: May 26, 1980–August 20, 1980
- Studio: Record One (Hollywood)
- Genres: Rock; country rock
- Length: 33:43
- Label: Epic
- Producer: Val Garay

Randy Meisner chronology
| Randy Meisner (1978) | One More Song (1980) | Randy Meisner (1982) |

Professional ratings
Review scores
| Source | Rating |
|---|---|
| AllMusic | 3/5 stars |
| Billboard | (unrated) |

One More Song is the second solo studio album by former Eagles bassist Randy Meisner. Released in October 1980 by Epic Records in the United States, and in the United Kingdom. The album was Meisner's most successful album as a solo artist, peaking at number 50, on the US Billboard 200 chart.

The single, "Deep Inside My Heart" featuring Kim Carnes, peaked at number 22 on the US Billboard Hot 100, and the single "Hearts on Fire" peaked at number 19, three months later.

== Critical reception ==
Retrospectively reviewing for AllMusic, critic Mike DeGagne wrote of the album "One More Song highlights Meisner's knack for writing honest, heartfelt love songs with a countrified rock candor that reveals his rustic, down-home roots." and he added that, "One More Song ends up being a pleasurable set of modest songs from a musician who was glad to be home."

== Track listing ==
Side one

1. "Hearts on Fire" (Eric Kaz, Meisner) – 2:48
2. "Gotta Get Away" (Kaz, Meisner, Wendy Waldman) – 4:03
3. "Come on Back to Me" (Kaz, Meisner, Waldman) – 3:51
4. "Deep Inside My Heart" duet with Kim Carnes (Kaz, Meisner) – 3:29
5. "I Need You Bad" (Kaz, Meisner, Waldman) – 3:11

Side two

1. "One More Song" (Jack Tempchin) – 3:55
2. "Trouble Ahead" (Kaz, Meisner, Waldman) – 4:12
3. "White Shoes" (Tempchin) – 4:11
4. "Anyway Bye Bye" (Richie Furay) – 4:30

== Personnel ==
- Randy Meisner – lead vocals, backing vocals, bass
- Sterling Smith – keyboards
- Craig Hull – acoustic guitars, electric guitars, pedal steel guitar
- Bryan Garofalo – bass
- Craig Krampf – drums
- Don Francisco – percussion, backing vocals

with:

- Wendy Waldman – acoustic guitar (3), backing vocals (3)
- Kim Carnes – backing vocals (4)
- Bill Cuomo – synth strings (5, 6)
- Michael Jacobson – saxophone (5)
- Glenn Frey – backing vocals (6)
- Don Henley – backing vocals (6)

== Production ==
- Val Garay – producer, recording
- Niko Bolas – assistant engineer
- James Ledner– assistant engineer
- Mike Reese – mastering
- Doug Sax – mastering
- The Mastering Lab (Hollywood, California) – mastering location
- Aaron Rapoport – photography
- John Kosh – art direction, design
- Trudy Green Management – management

== Charts ==
| Chart (1980) | Peak position |
|---|---|
| Australia (Kent Music Report) | 83 |
| Canada Top Albums/CDs (RPM) | 44 |
| US Top LPs & Tape (Billboard) | 50 |

=== Singles ===
Billboard (North America)

| Year | Single | Chart | Position |
|---|---|---|---|
| 1980 | "Deep Inside My Heart" | Hot 100 | 22 |
| 1981 | "Hearts On Fire" | Top Rock Tracks | 14 |
| 1981 | "Hearts On Fire" | Hot 100 | 19 |
