= We Beheld the Last Contraction of the Seraph =

EP by Abu Lahab
- Released: February 5, 2012
- Genre: Dark ambient, noise
- Length: 32:16

Abu Lahab chronology
We Beheld the Last Contraction of the Seraph (2012)	Humid Limbs of the Torn Beadsman (2012)

We Beheld the Last Contraction of the Seraph is an EP by Abu Lahab, independently released on February 5, 2012.

== Track listing ==
All music is composed by Abu Lahab.

No.	Title	Length
1.	"And No Health Was Left in Us"	6:12
2.	"Sharpen the Tooth of Thanatos"	7:03
3.	"Levitation of the Gravida"	9:16
4.	"Agony of a Hatching Eye"	6:37
5.	"Gyrosophism Indrafna"	3:07

== Personnel ==
Adapted from the We Beheld the Last Contraction of the Seraph liner notes.

- Abu Lahab – vocals, instruments, cover art
