= Of Heliotaxis and Cosmic Knifing =

EP by Abu Lahab
- Released: October 14, 2013
- Genre: Industrial
- Length: 30:30

Abu Lahab chronology
Supplications of the Last Gyrosophist (2013)	Of Heliotaxis and Cosmic Knifing (2013)

Of Heliotaxis and Cosmic Knifing is an EP by Abu Lahab, independently released on October 14, 2013. Quotes from Nico's Desertshore album serve as appendixes for Of Heliotaxis and Cosmic Knifing, with samples of "Le petit chevalier" used prominently in the opening and closing tracks.

== Track listing ==
All music is composed by Abu Lahab.

No.	Title	Length
1.	"Ignite the Solar Abdomen"	2:05
2.	"Cynocephalic Torments"	5:40
3.	"Tyranny of a Suspended Dawn"	6:30
4.	"Prostrate Exenterate"	3:13
5.	"A Thousand Plateaus"	6:17
6.	"Shatter the Gyre (Hermineusis of an End)"	6:47

== Personnel ==
Adapted from the Of Heliotaxis and Cosmic Knifing liner notes.

- Abu Lahab – vocals, instruments, cover art
