= The Marble Index (band) =

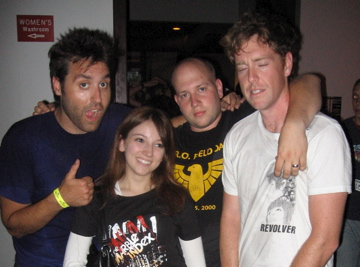
- Marble Index members posed with a fan after a show at the One On Whyte in Edmonton, Alberta, Canada(2007)

Background information
- Origin: Hamilton, Ontario, Canada
- Years active: 2001–2010, 2018–present
- Label: Maple Music (Canada)
- Members: Brad Germain; Ryan Tweedle; Adam Knickle
- Website: https://www.instagram.com/the_marble_index/

The Marble Index is a Canadian rock band from Hamilton, Ontario, Canada. The group formed in 2001, and comprised Brad Germain (guitars and vocals), Ryan Tweedle (bass), and Adam Knickle (drums). The band is named after the album The Marble Index by Nico. Not be to be confused with the American rock band The Marble Index from Austin, Texas, which formed in 1993 and disbanded in 1995.

== History ==
The Marble Index was formed in Hamilton, Ontario, in 2001 by Brad Germain, Ryan Tweedle and Adam Knickle. After being discontented with other bands they had played with, Germain and Knickle decided to start their own band with songs they had written at Adam's grandmothers house. After auditioning various bass players, they asked their friend Ryan Tweedle (at the time a guitar player) to join them since they did not have a bassist. Their first EP was recorded in 2002. It took less than a week to complete.

They were soon approached and signed by Canadian Music Manager Dan Brooks (Lowest of The Low/The Miniatures/The Meligrove Band), who was from Hamilton, Ontario, but had resided in the United Kingdom for a number of years. The band recorded their self-titled album with John Kettle in Wigan, England in 2004. They lived and recorded in a converted barn with no hot water or showers. Because of the substandard living conditions, the band was continuously getting sick. However, they persevered. After three weeks, the band emerged with an album. The band subsequently created their own label, Death Of Records, and after two industry showcases, licensed their debut release through Universal Music Canada. The 2006 release Watch Your Candles, Watch Your Knives was released through Maple Music and distributed by Universal Music Canada.

In late 2004, The Marble Index opened for The Pixies on their Canadian tour. Their second album was released in August 2006. It was recorded in Hamilton's Catherine North Studios, with producer Scott Shields (Joe Strummer and the Mescaleros). The band was nominated in 2005 for the Juno Award for New Group of the Year, but lost to Alexisonfire. The band toured throughout North America, as well as Europe and Japan. They picked up a number of Hamilton Music Awards, "Best New Group" 2004, "Peoples Choice" 2004, "Video of the Year" 2005 for "We Can Make It", "Drummer of the Year - Adam Knickle" 2005, they also enjoyed a number of "Best of:... 2004 and 2005 list including CFNY's 102.1 The Edge top 100 Songs list in both 2004 and 2005.

In the autumn of 2006, The Marble Index song "All That I Know" was featured in a Zellers back-to-school commercial. Two songs were also featured in a Labatts Blue commercial, and "I Believe" was featured on the Muchmusic compilation Big Shiny Tunes 9.

Hiatus (2009–2017)

Although never officially announced, the band decided to go on hiatus in early 2010. They recorded demos for a new album, but never entered the studio to record them. The group ended with numerous songs in the vault from a never released record titled "Destroy The Earth While There's Still Time".

The Marble Index shared the stage with many big acts including The Pixies, Hot Hot Heat, Billy Talent, Three Days Grace, Pilate, Hanoi Rocks, Powderfinger, 54-40, Massive Attack, Thornley, Bedouin Soundclash, The Trews, and Mother Mother. The group had toured extensively throughout their active 9 years and was said to be one of Canada's hardest working bands.

Reunion

2018–present

== Discography ==
- Watch Your Candles, Watch Your Knives (2006) Canada/USA/United Kingdom/Europe/Japan/Switzerland/Austria/Germany
- The Marble Index (2004) Canada/United Kingdom/Europe/Japan/Australia
- I Believe UK EP (2004) UK
- I Believe 7" single (2004) Canada
- EP (2002)
