= Outlaw Man =

Single by Eagles

from the album Desperado
- B-side: "Certain Kind of Fool"
- Released: August 6, 1973
- Genre: Country rock
- Length: 3:34
- Label: Asylum
- Songwriter: David Blue
- Producer: Glyn Johns

Eagles singles chronology
"Tequila Sunrise" (1973)	"Outlaw Man" (1973)	"Already Gone" (1974)

"Outlaw Man" is a song written by David Blue and recorded by the American rock band Eagles. The song was chosen by the Eagles for their second album, Desperado, as the song fits the theme of a Western outlaw gang of the album. It is the second single released from Desperado after "Tequila Sunrise".

== Background ==
Glenn Frey provides the lead vocals on this song, with the other members singing harmony on the chorus "Woman don't try to love me don't try to understand. The Life upon the road is a life of an Outlaw man."

Billboard said it had a "strong, Western flavored country rock sound... and polished vocal harmony." Record World said that it "is a natural for both AM and FM airplay" and that it is "well produced by Glyn Johns."

== Personnel ==
- Glenn Frey: lead vocals, acoustic guitar
- Bernie Leadon: harmony vocals, lead guitar, guitar solo
- Randy Meisner: harmony vocals, bass guitar
- Don Henley: harmony vocals, drums
- Jim Ed Norman: electric piano

== Charts ==
Chart (1973)	Peak position
US Billboard Hot 100	59

== Other recordings ==
- The song was also recorded by David Blue and released on his 1973 album Nice Baby and the Angel.
