= David Blue (album) =

Studio album by David Blue
- Released: August 1966
- Recorded: New York City, 1966
- Genres: Folk, folk rock
- Length: 44:00
- Label: Elektra
- Producer: Arthur Gorson

David Blue chronology
Singer Songwriter Project (1965)	David Blue (1966)	These 23 Days in September (1968)

David Blue is a folk album by David Blue, released by Elektra in 1966.

The album was produced by Arthur Gorson and recorded by Jac Holzman, with Bill Szymczyk as engineer; the sleeve featured photographs by Joel Brodsky (front) and William S. Harvey (back).

== Reception ==
David Blue was selected for The MOJO Collection as one of the most significant albums in musical history.

Richie Unterberger criticised David Blue for being derivative of Bob Dylan, particularly the recently released Highway 61 Revisited and Blonde on Blonde, but wrote that "If the songs on David Blue sometimes seemed like Dylan prototypes that had been thrown in the kitchen sink and tossed in the washing machine several times over, its stronger tracks were nevertheless quite enjoyable variations of their obvious model."

== Track listing ==
All tracks are written by David Blue.

Side one
No.	Title	Length
1.	"The Gasman Won't Buy Your Love"	3:00
2.	"About My Love"	2:35
3.	"So Easy She Goes By"	3:31
4.	"If Your Monkey Can't Get It"	2:58
5.	"Midnight Through Morning"	4:52
6.	"It Ain't the Rain That Sweeps the Highway Clean"	3:30
Total length:		20:26

Side two
No.	Title	Length
1.	"Arcade Love Machine"	3:50
2.	"Grand Hotel"	4:03
3.	"Justine"	2:58
4.	"I'd Like to Know"	2:22
5.	"The Street"	6:10
6.	"It Tastes Like Candy"	4:08
Total length:		23:34

== Personnel ==
- David Blue — vocals, acoustic guitar, electric guitar
- Monte Dunn — acoustic guitar, electric guitar
- Buddy Saltzman — drums
- Herbie Lovelle — drums
- Harvey Brooks — bass
- Paul Harris — piano, organ, electric piano, celesta
