= Deep Inside My Heart =

Single by Randy Meisner

from the album One More Song
- B-side: "I Need You Bad"
- Released: October 1980
- Genre: Pop, rock
- Length: 3:35
- Label: Epic Records
- Songwriters: Randy Meisner, Eric Kaz
- Producer: Val Garay

Randy Meisner singles chronology
"Deep Inside My Heart" (1980)	"Hearts on Fire" (1981)

Professional ratings
Review scores
Source	Rating
Billboard	(unrated)

"Deep Inside My Heart" is a song by former Eagles member Randy Meisner, with prominent backing vocal by Kim Carnes (who is uncredited on the single release). It became a hit in the United States during the fall of 1980, reaching #22 on the Billboard Hot 100. The song was a bigger hit in Canada, where it reached #12.

Meisner and Carnes performed "Deep Inside My Heart" on the NBC-TV late-night musical variety show The Midnight Special. A music video was also created for the song.

== Chart history ==
=== Weekly charts ===
Chart (1980–81)	Peak position
Australia (Kent Music Report)	34
Canada RPM Top Singles	12
U.S. Billboard Hot 100	22
U.S. Cash Box Top 100	27

=== Year-end charts ===
Chart (1980)	Rank
US (Joel Whitburn's Pop Annual)	142

Chart (1981)	Rank
Canada	99
