= Arthur Herbert (musician) =

American jazz musician

Arthur Herbert (born May 28, 1907, Brooklyn, New York) was an American jazz drummer.

== Early life ==
Both of Herbert's parents were of Trinidadian heritage. He worked in a silver and gold refinery as a young man, playing local gigs in New York nightclubs and hotels in his spare time. He left industry in 1935 to join Eddie Williams's band, and soon after started his own band, the Rhythm Masters. In the 1930s and 1940s he worked as a sideman with musicians such as Pete Brown, Coleman Hawkins, Hot Lips Page and Sidney Bechet.

In the 1950s Herbert went into semi-retirement as a musician and started up his own pest extermination business. He played in various swing jazz revival ensembles, and toured with Lem Johnson in Poland in the 1960s.

Herbert taught his nephew, drummer Herb Lovelle, whom he insisted should know how to read sheet music, something black musicians were then not held to know. He got his nephew his first gig with Hot Lips Page. He also taught drummer Shelly Manne, according to Herb Lovelle.
