= Supplications of the Last Gyrosophist =

Studio album by Abu Lahab
- Released: July 12, 2013
- Genre: Industrial
- Length: 44:05

Abu Lahab chronology
Humid Limbs of the Torn Beadsman (2012)	Supplications of the Last Gyrosophist (2013)	Of Heliotaxis and Cosmic Knifing (2013)

Supplications of the Last Gyrosophist is the second studio album by Abu Lahab, independently released on July 12, 2013. The music was notably less hostile than his previous work and showcased a more dance-oriented sound. At forty-four minutes, the album marks his lengthiest musical release to date.

== Track listing ==
All music is composed by Abu Lahab

No.	Title	Length
1.	"Hayenomorphic"	10:58
2.	"Her Spleen in the Pond"	8:11
3.	"Moth Moon Meiosis"	4:38
4.	"Baleful Night"	10:25
5.	"A Window, a Flickering Face"	9:53

== Personnel ==
Adapted from the Supplications of the Last Gyrosophist liner notes.

- Abu Lahab – vocals, instruments, cover art
