= Primordial Lovers =

- LP cover

Studio album by Essra Mohawk
- Released: May 1970
- Recorded: 1969
- Studio: Elektra Sound, Los Angeles; Pacific High, San Francisco
- Genre: Rock, jazz, soul
- Language: English
- Label: Reprise
- Producer: Frazier Mohawk

Essra Mohawk chronology
Sandy's Album Is Here At Last! (1968)	Primordial Lovers (1970)	Essra Mohawk (1974)

Alternative cover
- Mummypump Music CD cover

Primordial Lovers is the second album by American singer-songwriter Essra Mohawk, released in May 1970. The original Reprise LP included a 20-page booklet with the album's song lyrics.

In 2000 the album was re-released by Rhino Handmade as a 22-track collection Primordial Lovers MM, combining the original album with two non-album singles tracks, "Jabberwock Song" and "Image of Yu", and the entire 1974 follow-up album on Asylum Records, Essra Mohawk. In 2010 the album was reissued by Collectors' Choice with five previously unreleased bonus tracks.

== Critical reception ==
Professional ratings
Review scores
Source	Rating
Allmusic	4.5/5 stars

On AllMusic Charles Donovan said, "Primordial Lovers is assured of its status as an unsung classic. All who hear it, and there aren't enough, are bewitched by its esoteric poetry, unguarded passion, and great tunes.... Mohawk is a wondrous creature of contrasts: simultaneously urbane and nature-loving, knowing and naïve, all-powerful yet unabashedly vulnerable at the same time. Her voice is a remarkable instrument..."

== Track listing ==
All songs composed and arranged by Essra Mohawk.

Side 1

1. "I Am the Breeze"
2. "Spiral"
3. "I'll Give It to You Anyway"
4. "I Have Been Here Before"

Side 2

1. "Looking Forward to the Dawn"
2. "Thunder in the Morning"
3. "Lion on the Wing"
4. "It's Up to Me"
5. "It's Been a Beautiful Day"

=== Additional tracks on Collectors' Choice and Mummypump CD releases ===
10. "I Have Been Here Before" (piano / vocal)
11. "Someone Has Captured Me"
12. "Could You Lift Your Heart"
13. "Question"
14. "Drifter"

=== Additional tracks on Primordial Lovers MM Rhino Handmade CD release ===
Single-only tracks:

10. "Jabberwock Song"
11. "Image of Yu"

From the album Essra Mohawk:

12. "New Skins for Old"
13. "Openin' My Love Doors"
14. "Full Fledged Woman"
15. "You're Finally Here"
16. "Summertime"
17. "Back in the Spirit"
18. "You Make Me Come to Pieces"
19. "I Cannot Forget"
20. "Song to an Unborn Soul"
21. "If I'm Going to Go Crazy with Someone, It Might As Well Be You"
22. "Magic Pen"

== Personnel on original Primordial Lovers LP release ==
Musicians

- Essra Mohawk - vocals, piano
- Jerry Hahn - guitar on "Spiral", "It's Up to Me", "It's Been a Beautiful Day"
- Lee Underwood - guitar on "I Have Been Here Before"
- Doug Hastings - guitar on "I'll Give It to You Anyway", "Thunder in the Morning"
- Dallas Taylor - drums on "I'll Give It to You Anyway", "Thunder in the Morning"
- George Marsh - drums on "Spiral", "It's Up to Me", "It's Been a Beautiful Day"
- James Zitro - drums on "I Have Been Here Before"
- Mel Graves - bass on "Spiral", "It's Up to Me", "It's Been a Beautiful Day"
- Jerry Penrod - bass on "I'll Give It to You Anyway", "Thunder in the Morning"
- Bruce Cale, Kenneth Jenkins - bass on "I Have Been Here Before"
- Mike Cohen - organ on "I Have Been Here Before"
- Joe Keefe - vibraphone, finger cymbals on "I Have Been Here Before"
- Bert Wilson - tenor saxophone on "I Have Been Here Before"
- Al Aarons, Warren Gale - trumpet on "I Have Been Here Before"
- Kenny Shroyer - trombone on "I Have Been Here Before"
- Phil Teele - bass trombone on "I Have Been Here Before"
- Gale Robinson - French horn on "I Have Been Here Before"
- George St. John - oboe on "I Am the Breeze", "It's Up to Me"
- Peter Pilafian - violin on "Lion On the Wing"
- John Meyers, Mike Dubkin - flute on "It's Up To Me"

Production

- Frazier Mohawk - producer
- Brian Ross-Myring, Phil Sawyer, Fritz Richmond, Leonard Roberts - engineer
- John Haeny - mixing
- Ed Thrasher - art direction
- Barry Feinstein - photography
