= Abu Lahab (musical project) =

- Origin: Morocco
- Genre: Experimental rock
- Years active: 2000–present

Abu Lahab is an experimental music project based in Morocco. It takes its name from Abū Lahab, meaning "Father of Flame", who in Islamic tradition is one of the most prominent leaders in the Quraysh tribe of Banu Hashim and paternal uncle of the Islamic prophet Muhammad. Because of the nihilistic and anti-Islamic themes present in his oeuvre, the composer behind Abu Lahab has chosen to remain unidentified.

Active since 2000, the project bridges dark ambient, industrial and drone music to create nightmarish soundscapes. His three full-length albums, Humid Limbs of the Torn Beadsman (2012), Supplications of the Last Gyrosophist (2013) and Tungasht (2018), were met with enthusiasm by parts of the musical community.

== History ==
Between his beginnings in 2000 and first official releases in 2010, the composer of Abu Lahab's music worked under various pseudonyms. Starting in 2007, he began issuing a number of demo releases under the name Abu Lahab, including The Black Shrine, Altered Cult, When the Face of the Lord Is Split Asunder, Conversi ad Dominum and He Who Is Illuminated with the Brightest Light Will Cast the Longest Shadow. He continued to expand his sound with the mini-albums As Chastened Angels Descend Into the Thoracic Tombs and Moths From the Silver Reich, which showcased his sound collage compositional style and unique use of sampling.

The extended play We Beheld the Last Contraction of the Seraph marked his first official release in February 2012. Focusing on harsh dissonance, the music attempted to mix elements of black metal, dark ambient, drone, industrial and noise music into a cohesive whole. Abu Lahab's full-length debut album Humid Limbs of the Torn Beadsman followed in August 2012 and was seen by some as his masterpiece. The music was less aggressive than his previous release, but nonetheless continued to marry musique concrete and industrial music with his already cacophonous sound. On July 12, 2013, he released his second album Supplications of the Last Gyrosophist. The music was less aggressive and more experimental in contrast to his previous work, beginning a trajectory towards a more percussive and beat driven sound. Another EP, titled Of Heliotaxis and Cosmic Knifing, followed in October of that year and contained samples of Nico's 1970 album Desertshore. After four years of inactivity, he released Amhdaar on October 25, 2017, and featured two long-form compositions. He digitally released a new full-length album, Tungasht, on June 9, 2018.

== Discography ==
Studio albums

- Humid Limbs of the Torn Beadsman (2012)
- Supplications of the Last Gyrosophist (2013)
- Tungasht (2018)

Extended plays

- We Beheld the Last Contraction of the Seraph (2012)
- Of Heliotaxis and Cosmic Knifing (2013)
- Amhdaar (2017)

Demos

- The Black Shrine (2007)
- Altered Cult (2008)
- Moths From the Silver Reich (2010)
- Conversi ad Dominum (2010)
- When the Face of the Lord Is Split Asunder (2010)
- He Who Is Illuminated with the Brightest Light Will Cast the Longest Shadow (2011)
- As Chastened Angels Descend Into the Thoracic Tombs (2011)
