= Humid Limbs of the Torn Beadsman =

Studio album by Abu Lahab
- Released: August 4, 2012
- Genre: Experimental rock, dark ambient
- Length: 35:19

Abu Lahab chronology
We Beheld the Last Contraction of the Seraph (2012)	Humid Limbs of the Torn Beadsman (2012)	Supplications of the Last Gyrosophist (2013)

Humid Limbs of the Torn Beadsman is the debut studio album of Abu Lahab, independently released on August 4, 2012.

== Track listing ==
All music is composed by Abu Lahab

No.	Title	Length
1.	"Jeed"	1:05
2.	"Carve Hope Out of Their Bellies"	6:05
3.	"Burden of Senses"	3:20
4.	"Jeed II"	2:45
5.	"Dissolution"	5:58
6.	"Apathy Chord"	4:20
7.	"Cope with the Third Eye"	8:20
8.	"Thanatos Persists"	3:26

== Personnel ==
Adapted from the Humid Limbs of the Torn Beadsman liner notes.

- Abu Lahab – vocals, instruments, cover art
