= Essra Mohawk =

American singer-songwriter (1948–2023)

- Also known as: Sandy Hurvitz, Jamie Carter
- Born: Sandra Elayne Hurvitz; April 23, 1948; Philadelphia, Pennsylvania, U.S.
- Died: December 11, 2023 (aged 75) Nashville, Tennessee, U.S.
- Genres: Folk jazz; blues; Avant-garde jazz; folk
- Occupations: Singer; songwriter
- Instruments: Vocals; piano; guitar; mandolin
- Years active: 1964–2023
- Label: Elektra
- Website: Official website, via Wayback Machine

Essra Mohawk (/ˈɛsrə/; born Sandra Elayne Hurvitz; April 23, 1948 – December 11, 2023) was an American singer-songwriter who recorded a dozen albums.

Her best-known songs include "Sufferin' Til Suffrage" and "Interjections!" (both from Schoolhouse Rock!), "Change of Heart", recorded by Cyndi Lauper and "Stronger Than the Wind", recorded by Tina Turner. Her second album Primordial Lovers was critically acclaimed.

== Biography ==
Sandra Elayne Hurvitz was born in Philadelphia, Pennsylvania, on April 23, 1948. Her first record, credited as Jamie Carter, was the single "The Boy with the Way", backed with "The Memory of Your Voice", issued on Liberty Records in 1964. As Sandy Hurvitz, she was then discovered by Shadow Morton, who placed her songs with both the Shangri-Las ("I'll Never Learn") and the Vanilla Fudge ("The Spell That Comes After"). While living in New York City in 1967 she met Frank Zappa, who persuaded her to perform for a short time with the Mothers of Invention and then signed her to his Bizarre Records production company. While he initially helped to produce her first album, he left the project and assigned it to woodwind player and keyboardist Ian Underwood. Hurvitz opened for Procol Harum when they performed at the Cafe Au Go Go in 1967, and Keith Reid wrote "Quite Rightly So", which appeared on their second album Shine On Brightly, for her. Her first album Sandy's Album Is Here At Last was released on Bizarre/Verve in December 1968.

In 1969 she was signed by Reprise Records after executive Mo Ostin discovered her singing at a club in New York. The resulting album, Primordial Lovers, was later said to be "firmly on my list of the 25 all-time best albums" by Paul Williams in Rolling Stone magazine. The album featured contributions from CSN&Y drummer Dallas Taylor and former Rhinoceros members Doug Hastings and Jerry Penrod. Essra nearly joined Rhinoceros in its original line-up. While recording the album, she married her producer Frazier Mohawk (born Barry Friedman, 1941) and from then on was known as Essra Mohawk. "Essra" (S-ra) is an abbreviated form of "Sandra."

She was scheduled to perform at the original Woodstock Festival, but her driver took a wrong turn on the way. “We got there in time to see the last verse of the last song of the last act of the first night, and then the stage went dark before we got to it from the parking lot,” she recalled in a 2009 video interview.

Members of Generation X, as well as some people younger than them, may recognize her distinctive voice from the Saturday morning TV series Schoolhouse Rock!, as she lent her voice to "Interjections!", "Mother Necessity" and "Sufferin' Till Suffrage" in the mid-1970s. In addition, Mohawk sang the theme song to "Teeny Little Super Guy", a regular segment on Sesame Street during the 1980s.

Her third album, Essra Mohawk, came out on Asylum Records in 1974. It was panned by Village Voice critic Robert Christgau, who wrote in Christgau's Record Guide: Rock Albums of the Seventies (1981): "Here is a vocalist who should throw away all her Leon Russell records. When she calls herself a 'full-fledged woman,' it sounds like 'pool player's' woman, which given her persona makes more sense." The next album, Essra, was released on yet another label, Private Stock, in 1976. During that period, she also worked as a session and background singer, for John Mellencamp and Carole King, and later she performed with the Jerry Garcia Band, and recorded and arranged background vocals for Kool & the Gang. In 1982 after recording another album in L.A., she worked with McFadden and Whitehead in Philadelphia, penning "Not With Me" for their Capitol album, Movin' On. She released another solo album, E-Turn, before Cyndi Lauper had a hit with her song "Change of Heart" in 1986.

In 2011 she provided the lead vocal for an animated short film produced by TDA Animation, about the struggle for gay rights, called "Sufferin' Till You're Straight". The spot featured former Supremes Scherrie Payne and Susaye Greene on background vocals.

Mohawk wrote songs for other artists including co-writing a song entitled "Infinite Eyes" with blues artist Keb Mo as well as recording and performing in concert. She released six more albums after moving to Nashville in 1993. Her songs have been aired on the TV series Joan of Arcadia and the soap opera All My Children. Rhino released a special limited edition of her second and third albums, Primordial Lovers MM, in 2000. Mohawk was a longtime advocate of peace and environmental protection. She was a member of the board of Musicians and Artists for Peace and was their Nashville coordinator.

She died of cancer at her home in Nashville.

== Discography ==
Albums

- Sandy's Album Is Here At Last! – Bizarre – 1968 (as Sandy Hurvitz)
- Primordial Lovers – Reprise – 1970
- Essra Mohawk – Asylum – 1974
- Essra – Private Stock – 1976
- Burnin' Shinin' – San Francisco Sound – 1982
- E-Turn – Eclipse – 1985
- Raindance – Schoolkids – 1995
- Essie Mae Hawk Meets the Killer Groove Band – Mummypump – 1999
- Essra Live at Genghis Cohen – Mummypump – 2001
- You're Not Alone – Evidence – 2003
- Love Is Still the Answer – Mummypump – 2006
- Revelations of the Secret Diva – Mummypump – 2007
- 1979: The Supersound Sessions and More – Mummypump – 2017
- The One and Only – Mummypump – 2019

Singles

- "The Boy with the Way" / "The Memory of Your Voice" – Liberty – 1964 (as Jamie Carter)
- "Spiral" / "Image of Yu" – Reprise – 1970
- "Jabberwock Song" / "It's Up to Me" – Reprise – 1970
- "Full Fledged Woman" / "Magic Pen" – Asylum – 1974
- "Man of Mystery" / "Summertime" – Black Cat – 2009 (with Pacific Eardrum)

Compilations

- Mama Kangaroos: Philly Women Sing Captain Beefheart – Genus – 2005 (Mohawk sings "Party of Special Things to Do")
- Four-beat Rhythm: The Writings of Wilhelm Reich – Kreiselwelle – 2013 (Mohawk sings "Thoughts of Import")
