= David Blue (musician) =

American singer-songwriter (1941–1982)

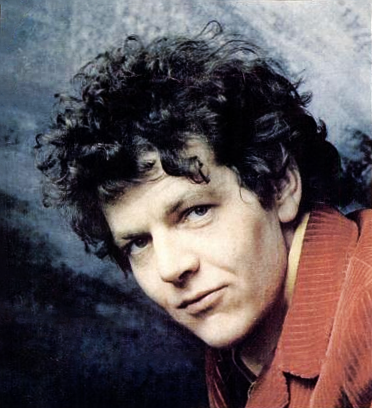
- David Blue in 1966

Background information
- Born: Stuart David Cohen; February 18, 1941; Providence, Rhode Island, US
- Died: December 2, 1982 (aged 41) New York City, US
- Genre: Folk
- Occupations: Singer-songwriter, actor
- Instruments: Guitar, vocals
- Years active: 1965—1982
- Labels: Elektra, Reprise, Asylum, Wounded Bird
- Website: David Blue website

Charlotte (Charlotte Stewart) and milkman Earl Duke (David Blue) flirt in Human Highway. The film was released shortly after his death.

David Blue (born Stuart David Cohen; February 18, 1941 – December 2, 1982) was an American folk music singer-songwriter and actor.

== Early life and education ==
The son of a Jewish father and a mother of Irish Roman Catholic/French Canadian descent, David Blue quit high school at age 17, left home, and joined the Navy, but was soon thrown out for his "Inability to adjust to a military way of life."

== Career ==
Blue became an integral part of the Greenwich Village folk music scene in New York City, which included Bob Dylan, Phil Ochs, Dave Van Ronk, Tom Paxton, Bob Neuwirth, and Eric Andersen. Blue is best known for writing the song "Outlaw Man" for the Eagles, which was included on their 1973 Desperado album. Blue's original version of "Outlaw Man" was the lead track of his own Nice Baby and the Angel album, re-issued on CD, with the entire David Blue catalogue, in 2007 on Wounded Bird Records.

Blue joined Dylan's Rolling Thunder Revue in 1975 and appeared in Renaldo and Clara, the 1978 movie that was filmed during that tour. Blue acted in other films including, The American Friend (1977), directed by Wim Wenders, The Ordeal of Patty Hearst (a 1979 TV movie) and Human Highway (1982) by Neil Young. Human Highway premiered in 1983 after Blue's death. Blue also performed onstage in Stephen Poliakoff's play American Days at Manhattan Theatre Club in New York City, in December 1980, directed by Jacques Levy.

== Death ==
Blue died of a heart attack in December 1982 at the age of 41 while jogging in Washington Square Park in New York City.

== Discography ==
- Singer Songwriter Project (Elektra, 1965) (Blue, who is credited as David Cohen, contributes three tracks and is one of four artists; the others are Richard Fariña, Patrick Sky and Bruce Murdoch)
- David Blue (Elektra, 1966)
- These 23 Days in September (Reprise, 1968)
- Me (Reprise, 1970) (released under the name S. David Cohen)
- Stories (Asylum, 1972)
- Nice Baby and the Angel, (Asylum, 1973)
- Com'n Back for More (Asylum, 1975)
- Cupid's Arrow (Asylum, 1976)
- The Lost 1967 Elektra Recordings & More (David Blue & the American Patrol) (Mapache Records, 2023)

== Filmography ==
Year	Title	Role	Notes
1977	The American Friend	Allan Winter	
1978	Renaldo and Clara	Himself	
1979	The Ordeal of Patty Hearst	Schiller	TV movie
1982	Human Highway	Earl Duke	(final film role)
