= Desperado (Eagles album) =

Studio album by the Eagles
- Released: April 17, 1973
- Recorded: February 1973
- Studios: Island (London, England)
- Genres: Country rock; folk rock
- Length: 35:40
- Label: Asylum
- Producer: Glyn Johns

The Eagles chronology
Eagles (1972)	Desperado (1973)	On the Border (1974)

Singles from Desperado
- 1. "Tequila Sunrise" Released: April 17, 1973; 2. "Outlaw Man" Released: August 6, 1973

Desperado is the second studio album by the American rock band the Eagles, released on April 17, 1973, by Asylum Records. The album was produced by Glyn Johns and was recorded at Island Studios in London, England. The songs on Desperado are based on the themes of the Old West. The band members are featured on the album's cover dressed like an outlaw gang; Desperado remains the only Eagles album where the band members appear on the front cover.

Although the title track is one of the Eagles' signature songs, it was never released as a single. The song "Desperado" was ranked number 494 on Rolling Stone's 2004 list of "The 500 Greatest Songs of All Time". The album did yield two singles, "Tequila Sunrise" and "Outlaw Man", which reached number 64 and number 59 respectively. The album reached number 41 on the Billboard album chart and was certified gold by the RIAA on September 23, 1974, and double platinum on March 20, 2001. In 2000, Desperado was inducted into the Grammy Hall of Fame.

Desperado was the last Asylum Records album to be distributed in North America by Atlantic Records (catalog no. SD 5068), prior to Asylum's mid-1973 merger with Elektra Records by Asylum's, Elektra's and Atlantic's parent company, Warner Communications.

== Background ==
=== Theme ===
After a commercially successful first album, Frey wanted the second album to be one with which they could be taken seriously as artists, and became interested in making a concept album. The original concept was for songs about anti-heroes; according to Glenn Frey, he was jamming together with Don Henley, Jackson Browne, and JD Souther after a Tim Hardin concert when they had the idea of doing an album about anti-heroes. One inspiration was a book on gunfighters of the Wild West given to Browne by Ned Doheny for his 21st birthday, and Browne showed them the book and suggested the theme. The book includes stories about Bill Dalton and Bill Doolin; from this came the song "Doolin-Dalton". However, they ran out of ideas after writing "Doolin-Dalton" about the Doolin-Dalton Gang, and "James Dean" about the actor James Dean. The idea for anti-heroes then became the Western-themed Desperado, and the song "James Dean" would be used for the next album On the Border instead.

Jackson Browne himself credited the song "Desperado", written by Frey and Henley, as the origin of the outlaw theme of the album. Bernie Leadon said that Frey liked the idea of an analogy between outlaw gangs and rock-and-roll: "Glenn sat everybody down and mapped out which characters in the gang could have songs written about them, or encouraged us to write songs about this concept." As Frey said of the album in an interview in 1973: "It has its moments where it definitely draws some parallels between rock-and-roll and being an outlaw. Outside the laws of normality, I guess. I mean, I feel like I'm breaking a law all the time. What we live and what we do is kind of a fantasy." Henley also said that the album was to be their "big artistic commentary on the evils of fame and success, with a cowboy metaphor." However, he admitted: "The metaphor was probably a little bullshit. We were in L.A. staying up all night, smoking dope, living the California life, and I suppose we thought it was as radical as cowboys in the old West. We were really rebelling against the music business, not society." Part of the reasons for their dissatisfaction and cynicism with the music business was due to David Geffen selling his independent Asylum label to Warner Communications which then merged it with Elektra, and the band attributed this as the reason for the lack of interest in promoting the band internationally by EMI.

=== Compositions ===
Frey and Henley decided that they should write songs together after they recorded their first album Eagles in London in 1972, and the first songs they wrote together days after they returned to Los Angeles were "Desperado" and "Tequila Sunrise", both written within the first week of their collaboration. The other songs in the album quickly came together after they had decided on the Western theme. While Desperado does not have a specific narrative, and the songs do not all necessarily fit in with the theme explicitly, the album has been described as being "suffused with the atmosphere of the open plains and a tough, peculiarly male kind of loneliness" that can "trick the listener into believing they are" tied to the theme.

This album is the beginning of the songwriting partnership of Frey and Henley; in all Frey and Henley were involved in writing eight of the eleven songs in the album. Henley noted: "That’s when we became a team." The songwriting prowess of Frey and Henley in Desperado also marks the beginning of their dominance in the band. Henley said in retrospect: "That was a real crucial time for us. When we formed the band, it was supposed to be one of those 'everybody's equal' affairs. We'd all sing and all write and so forth. But the fact is people aren't all going to be able to do everything the same. It's just like on a football team . . . . Some people quarterback and some people block. So we went through a lot of hassles for a while."

Leadon wrote two songs – "Twenty-One" and "Bitter Creek" – while Randy Meisner co-wrote "Certain Kind of Fool" and "Saturday Night". "Twenty-One" refers to the age of Emmett Dalton, the youngest of the Dalton gang, when he was shot 23 times but survived during the raid on Coffeyville, Kansas, in October 1892. Meisner came up with the idea for how someone became an outlaw in "Certain Kind of Fool", wrote most of it, and said of his contribution: "I kinda started it. And that's what usually happened – I'd get a verse or two, and I'm done, and they would help fill in the blanks" The only song on the album not written by the band members of Eagles is "Outlaw Man", which was written by David Blue and chosen because it fit the theme.

=== Recording ===
The album was recorded at the Island Studios in London, which took four weeks at a cost of £30,000. The producer Glyn Johns wanted to produce the album quickly and economically, each track was therefore limited to four or five takes, and requests to record more were refused. Henley would later state that his greatest regret was that he did not sing as well as he could on the title track "Desperado", and would have liked to redo the song. According to the producer Johns, he and Leadon tried to come up with a few musical links in an attempt to tie up the story for an outlaw concept in the album; however, the concept itself dissipated. The band was very happy with the finished result; after Johns had played the album back to them in its entirety for the first time, they carried him on their shoulders out of the control room.

However, the finished recording was received poorly by Jerry Greenberg, the president of Atlantic Records, who said: "Jeez, they've made a fucking cowboy album!"

The film director Sam Peckinpah had planned to use the album as the basis for a film, but the plan did not come to fruition.

== Artwork ==
The photograph on the back cover as a reenactment of the capture of the Dalton Gang. On the ground are Jackson Browne, Bernie Leadon, Glenn Frey, Randy Meisner, Don Henley, and JD Souther

The artwork for the album was done by artist Gary Burden with photos by Henry Diltz, both of whom were also responsible for Eagles' first album. To illustrate the theme for the music in the album, the original concept was for a gatefold album with the band dressed as outlaws on the front cover with images of gunfight and the Wild West inside. The centerfold idea, however, was scrapped by David Geffen.

On the back of the album is an image of all four members of the band together with Jackson Browne and JD Souther lying dead and bound on the ground. A posse stands over them, including the producer Glyn Johns (far right in a white hat), manager John Hartmann, road manager Tommy Nixon, artist Boyd Elder (who would be responsible for the skull artwork of Eagles' later albums), roadies, and Gary Burden (far left). The photo is meant to be a reenactment of the historical image of the capture and death of the Dalton Gang. Jackson Browne said that the image on the back cover with the musicians lying dead is when the "whole thing really comes together".

The photo shoot took place at the Paramount Ranch, an old film set for Western movies in Malibu Canyon. It was, however, an expensive shoot, and to justify the cost a promotional film for the album was also made at the same time. The film was shot on Super-8, then sepia-tinted, and transferred to videotape. In each process a little video quality is lost, which Frey described as a "nice accident" as it made the video appear aged and more realistic. Henley described the promotional film, like the album itself, as "a commentary on [their] loss of innocence with regard to how the music business really worked".

== Critical reception ==
Professional ratings
Review scores
Source	Rating
AllMusic	3.5/5 stars
Christgau's Record Guide	C
The Daily Vault	B+
The Encyclopedia of Popular Music	5/5 stars
Rolling Stone (2004)	3/5 stars

Paul Gambaccini of Rolling Stone gave the album a positive review on its release in 1973. He wrote: "The beautiful thing about it is that although it is a unified set of songs, it is not a rock opera, a concept album, or anything pretending to be much more than a set of good tunes that just happen to fit together." In conclusion, he wrote: "Desperado won't cure your hangover or revalue the dollar, but it will give you many good times. With their second consecutive job well done, the Eagles are on a winning streak." Robert Christgau, however, took the view that "with its barstool-macho equation of gunslinger and guitarschlonger, its on-the-road misogyny, its playing-card metaphors, and its paucity of decent songs, this soundtrack to an imaginary Sam Peckinpah movie is "concept" at its most mindless." AllMusic editor William Ruhlmann praised that Henley had more involvement with the album, but wrote that it "was simultaneously more ambitious and serious-minded than its predecessor and also slighter and less consistent."

The album is now considered by some critics to be one of the significant albums of country rock. Music writer John Einarson argued in his book Desperados: The Roots of Country Rock that despite its weak initial sales, the album "would set the tone for all the later soft country rock sounds, and impact what would become the foundation of 'new country', in both image and music." It was voted number 631 in the third edition of Colin Larkin's All Time Top 1000 Albums (2000).

Ultimate Classic Rock critic Sterling Whitaker rated both "Tequila Sunrise" and "Doolin-Dalton" as being among the Eagles' 10 most underrated songs.

== Commercial performance ==
Released in April 1973, the album was not a commercial success initially. It debuted on the US Billboard 200 chart at a lowly number 145 on its week of its release, rising to number 41 in its eighth week on the chart, It remains Eagles' lowest charting album and it produced no hit song, as both singles released from the album, "Tequila Sunrise" and "Outlaw Man", failed to reach top 50 on the main singles chart.

However, the success of their next album release, On the Border, as well as subsequent releases, spurred on the sales of the album. It was certified Gold on September 23, 1974 by the Recording Industry Association of America (RIAA) after the release of On the Border, followed by a double platinum certification on March 20, 2001, indicating shipment of 2 million copies in the United States.

== Track listing ==
Side one
No.	Title	Writer(s)	Lead vocals	Length
1.	"Doolin-Dalton"	Don Henley; Glenn Frey; JD Souther; Jackson Browne	Henley and Frey	3:26
2.	"Twenty-One"	Bernie Leadon	Leadon	2:11
3.	"Out of Control"	Henley; Frey; Tom Nixon	Frey	3:04
4.	"Tequila Sunrise"	Henley; Frey	Frey	2:52
5.	"Desperado"	Henley; Frey	Henley	3:36

Side two
No.	Title	Writer(s)	Lead vocals	Length
1.	"Certain Kind of Fool"	Randy Meisner; Henley; Frey	Meisner	3:02
2.	"Doolin-Dalton (Reprise)"	Henley; Frey; Souther; Browne	instrumental	0:48
3.	"Outlaw Man"	David Blue	Frey	3:34
4.	"Saturday Night"	Henley; Frey; Meisner; Leadon	Henley with Meisner	3:20
5.	"Bitter Creek"	Leadon	Leadon	5:00
6.	"Doolin-Dalton/Desperado (Reprise)"	Henley; Frey; Souther; Browne	Henley	4:50

== Personnel ==
Eagles

- Glenn Frey – vocals, acoustic and electric guitars, keyboards, harmonica
- Don Henley – vocals, drums, acoustic guitar
- Bernie Leadon – vocals, electric and acoustic guitars, banjo, mandolin, Dobro
- Randy Meisner – vocals, bass guitar

Production

- Glyn Johns – producer, engineer
- Howard Kilgour – assistant engineer
- Barry Diament – mastering
- Ted Jensen – remastering
- Jim Ed Norman – string arrangements, conductor, piano ("Saturday Night"), electric piano ("Outlaw Man")
- Gary Burden – art direction, design
- Henry Diltz – lettering, photography

== Charts ==
=== Weekly charts ===
Chart (1973–1976)	Peak position
Australia Albums (Kent Music Report)	31
Canada Top Albums/CDs (RPM)	35
Dutch Albums (Album Top 100)	5
New Zealand Albums (RMNZ)	40
UK Albums (Official Charts)	39
US Billboard 200	41

=== Year-end charts ===
Chart (1973)	Position
Dutch Albums (Album Top 100)	32
US Billboard 200	64

== Certifications ==
Region	Certification	Certified units/sales
Canada (Music Canada)	Gold	50,000^{^}
New Zealand (RMNZ)	Gold	7,500^{‡}
United Kingdom (BPI) 2006 release	Silver	60,000^{‡}
United States (RIAA)	2× Platinum	2,000,000^{^}
^{^} Shipments figures based on certification alone.^{‡} Sales+streaming figures based on certification alone.
