= Desertshore =

Studio album by Nico
- Released: 20 December 1970
- Recorded: 1970
- Studios: Sound Techniques Ltd., London, England; except "Le Petit Chevalier", at Studios Davout, Paris, France
- Genres: Avant-garde; avant-folk; chamber folk; neo-classical
- Length: 28:54
- Label: Reprise
- Producers: John Cale, Joe Boyd

Nico chronology
The Marble Index (1969)	Desertshore (1970)	Andy Warhol's Velvet Underground Featuring Nico (1971)

Desertshore is the third studio album by German musician Nico. It was released in December 1970 on the Reprise label and co-produced by John Cale and Joe Boyd.

== Recording ==
Desertshore was co-produced by John Cale and Joe Boyd.

"Janitor of Lunacy" was composed as a tribute to her friend Brian Jones, founding member of the Rolling Stones, who had died the previous year.

The back and front covers feature stills from the film The Inner Scar by Philippe Garrel which starred Nico, Garrel and her son Ari Boulogne. A few of the songs from the album were included on the film's soundtrack.

== Legacy ==
Professional ratings
Review scores
Source	Rating
AllMusic	4.5/5 stars
Christgau's Record Guide	C
The New Rolling Stone Album Guide	4.5/5 stars
Tiny Mix Tapes	5/5 marks

Like The Marble Index, Desertshore obtained a small cult following its release, but was overlooked by most large publications and the public in general. However, it has received mainstream praise from critics in subsequent years with AllMusic and The New Rolling Stone Album Guide in particular providing a strong and positive reception. Tiny Mix Tapes rated Desertshore five out of five. The Village Voice was less favorable—giving the album a C rating.

"All That Is My Own" was selected by Morrissey for inclusion on his Under the Influence compilation.

"Le petit chevalier" was covered live by Bjork during her Post tour in 1996 and also by Bat for Lashes in 2007 at the Glastonbury festival. It was prominently sampled by Abu Lahab on his 2013 album Of Heliotaxis and Cosmic Knifing. "Janitor of Lunacy" was covered by Austrian artist Soap&Skin and included in her 2008 debut EP.

== X-TG cover ==
Industrial music pioneers Throbbing Gristle entered the studio to record a reinterpretation of Desertshore in 2007. The product of this studio session which was made open-to-the public was The Desertshore Installation, a record of the entirety of the 3-day, 12-hour-long session. The plan had been to edit the three days of recordings and craft a finished album from it but the group was not satisfied with the sessions. Peter Christopherson continued working on it in Bangkok with Danny Hyde until his death in November 2010.

Hyde passed the remaining work to Throbbing Gristle members Chris Carter and Cosey Fanni Tutti to complete, which they did with the help of several guest vocalists including Marc Almond, Sasha Grey, Blixa Bargeld and Anohni. Desertshore/The Final Report was released on 26 November 2012 under the name X-TG The Album. It debuted live at AV Festival on 17 March 2012, performed by Carter and Tutti. It was accompanied by a screening of Philippe Garrel’s La cicatrice intérieure, "for which Desertshore was soundtrack and inspiration".

== Track listing ==
All tracks are written by Nico.

Side A
No.	Title	Length
1.	"Janitor of Lunacy"	4:01
2.	"The Falconer"	5:39
3.	"My Only Child"	3:27
4.	"Le petit chevalier"	1:12
Total length:		14:19

Side B
No.	Title	Length
5.	"Abschied"	3:02
6.	"Afraid"	3:27
7.	"Mütterlein"	4:38
8.	"All That Is My Own"	3:28
Total length:		14:35

== Personnel ==
- Nico – vocals, harmonium
- John Cale – all other instruments except trumpet
- John Cale and Adam Miller – harmony voices
- Ari Boulogne – vocals on "Le petit chevalier"
