= Randy Meisner (1982 album) =

Studio album by Randy Meisner
- Released: August 1982
- Recorded: December 18, 1981–February 22, 1982
- Studio: Cherokee Studios (Hollywood, California); Kaye-Smith Studios (Seattle, Washington)
- Genre: Rock, country rock
- Length: 38:11
- Label: Epic
- Producer: Mike Flicker, Randy Meisner

Randy Meisner chronology
One More Song (1980)	Randy Meisner (1982)	Dallas (1983)

Professional ratings
Review scores
Source	Rating
AllMusic	4/5 stars

Randy Meisner is the third and final solo studio album (and the second self-titled) by Randy Meisner. It was released in mid 1982, on Epic in the United States, and in the United Kingdom. The album features a duet with Heart's lead vocalist Ann Wilson; her Heart bandmates Nancy Wilson and Howard Leese also contributed to the album.

== Critical reception ==
Retrospectively reviewing for AllMusic, critic Bruce Eder wrote that the album "is a gorgeous country-rock production with a hard electric edge in all the right places and soaring melodies throughout" and he added that, "There are pleasing guitar hooks throughout, and the album's mix of raw power and subtle lyricism has endured very well over the decades."

== Track listing ==
1. "Never Been in Love" (Craig Bickhardt) – 4:26
2. "Darkness of the Heart" (David Palmer) – 4:18
3. "Jealousy" (Meisner, Dixon House, Howard Leese) – 4:55
4. "Tonight" (Bryan Adams, Jim Vallance) – 5:12
5. "Playin' in the Deep End" (Meisner, House) – 4:08
6. "Strangers" (with Ann Wilson) (Elton John, Gary Osborne) – 3:56
7. "Still Runnin'" (House, Leese) – 3:28
8. "Nothing Is Said ('Til the Artist Is Dead)" (Meisner, House) – 3:58
9. "Doin' It for Delilah" (John Corey) – 3:50

== Personnel ==
- Randy Meisner – lead vocals, backing vocals
- Mitchell Froom – synthesizers (1, 7)
- Dixon House – acoustic piano, organ, backing vocals, vocal arrangements
- Sterling Smith – acoustic piano, organ, synthesizers
- Nicky Hopkins – acoustic piano (3, 7, 9)
- Brian Smith – lead guitar (1, 2, 4), acoustic guitar (1, 2, 4), electric guitar (1, 2, 4)
- John Corey – acoustic guitars, electric guitars, backing vocals, acoustic piano (6), acoustic guitar (6), electric guitar (6), guitar solo (9), vocal arrangements
- Howard Leese – electric guitars, backing vocals, lead guitar (3, 4), synthesizers (4)
- Tom Erak – bass
- Denny Carmassi – drums
- Phil Kenzie – saxophone solo (3, 7)
- Tower of Power – horn section (3, 5, 9)
- Greg Adams – horn arrangements (3, 5, 9)
- Paul Buckmaster – string arrangements and conductor (6)
- Marcy Levy – backing vocals (1, 3, 4, 7, 8)
- Nancy Wilson – backing vocals (1, 4–6)
- Ann Wilson – co–lead vocals (6)

== Production ==
- Mike Flicker – producer, engineer, mixing
- Rolf Hennemann – engineer, mixing
- Greg Fulginiti – mastering at Kendun Recorders (Burbank, California)
- John Kosh – art direction, design
- Henry Diltz – inner sleeve photography
- George Holz – back cover photography
- Trudy Green – management
