= Randy Meisner (1978 album) =

Studio album by Randy Meisner
- Released: June 1978
- Studios: Devonshire Sound Studios (North Hollywood, California)
- Genres: Rock, country rock, soft rock
- Length: 41:52
- Label: Asylum
- Producer: Alan Brackett

Randy Meisner chronology
| Randy Meisner (1978) | One More Song (1980) |

Professional ratings
Review scores
| Source | Rating |
|---|---|
| AllMusic | 3/5 stars |

Randy Meisner is the self-titled debut solo studio album by Randy Meisner. It was released in mid 1978, on Asylum in the United States, and in the United Kingdom. The track "Bad Man", was featured in the film FM, which also included an appearance by his one-time employer Linda Ronstadt.

== Critical reception ==
Retrospectively reviewing for AllMusic, critic Bruce Eder wrote of the album "The songs run between the extremes of fluid, guitar-driven rockers ("Bad Man," "Every Other Day") and ballads draped in flowing lyricism with harmony singing ("Daughter of the Sky"), including major contributions from his one-time teenage bandmate Donny Ullstrom. Apart from a somewhat dullish rendition of "Save the Last Dance for Me," the album works well, particularly a soulful and highly personalized rendition of "Take It to the Limit.""

== Track listing ==
1. "Bad Man" (Glenn Frey, JD Souther) – 2:39
2. "Daughter of the Sky" (Bill Lamb) – 4:15
3. "It Hurts to Be in Love" (Howard Greenfield, Helen Miller) – 2:27
4. "Save the Last Dance for Me" (Doc Pomus, Mort Shuman) – 2:58
5. "Please Be With Me" (Scott Boyer) – 3:22
6. "Take It to the Limit" (Meisner, Frey, Don Henley) – 4:19
7. "Lonesome Cowgirl" (Alan Brackett, John Merrill) – 3:43
8. "Too Many Lovers" (Lamb) – 4:04
9. "If You Wanna Be Happy" (Frank Guida, Joseph Royster, Carmela Guida) – 2:45
10. "I Really Want You Here Tonight" (Brackett) – 3:49
11. "Every Other Day" (Lamb) – 3:52
12. "Heartsong" (Bill Martin) – 3:59

== Charts ==
| Chart (1978) | Peak position |
|---|---|
| Australia (Kent Music Report) | 90 |
| Canada | 2 |
| USA Country | 7 |

== Personnel ==
- Randy Meisner – vocals, bass (4), backing vocals (6, 7)
- Geoffrey Leib – acoustic piano (1)
- John Hobbs – acoustic piano (2–9, 11, 12), organ (5), electric piano (10)
- Scott Shelley – string synthesizer (2)
- Steve Edwards – lead guitar (1), guitars (2, 3, 5, 7, 8, 10, 12), dobro (5), slide guitar (11)
- Jerry Swallow – guitars
- Kerry Morris – bass (1–3, 5, 7–12)
- Kelly Shanahan – drums (1–5, 7–12)
- Victor Feldman – percussion (4, 9)
- Ernie Watts – saxophone (4, 8–10)
- Byron Berline – fiddle (7)
- Marty Paich – strings (8, 10, 12)
- Donny Ullstrom – backing vocals (1–5, 7, 8, 11, 12)
- Alan Brackett – backing vocals (2, 4, 8, 9), Marxophone (5)
- Tita Kerpan – backing vocals (2, 10)
- Jayne Zinsmaster – backing vocals (2, 10)
- JD Souther – backing vocals (4, 10, 11)
- David Cassidy – backing vocals (5, 6, 10)
- Steven Scharf – backing vocals (6, 8, 10)
- Ritchie Walker – backing vocals (9)
- Bill Lamb – backing vocals (11)

=== Production ===
- Alan Brackett – producer
- Jerry Hudgins – engineer
- John Kosh – art direction, design
- Jim Shea – photography
- Front Line Management – management
