= The Marble Index =

Studio album by Nico
- Released: November 1968
- Recorded: September 1968
- Studios: Elektra, Los Angeles
- Genre: Avant-folk
- Length: 30:48
- Label: Elektra
- Producers: Frazier Mohawk; John Cale (de facto)

Nico chronology
Chelsea Girl (1967)	The Marble Index (1968)	Desertshore (1970)

The Marble Index is the second studio album by the German musician Nico, released in November 1968 on Elektra Records. The avant-garde sound introduced in the album—a stark contrast with her folk pop debut, Chelsea Girl (1967)—was the result of the combination of Nico's droning harmonium and somber vocals, and the producer John Cale's musical arrangements, which were inspired by modern European classical music. Nico envisioned the release as an attempt to get artistic legitimacy and to change the perception that she was notable only due to her early career as a fashion model.

Although The Marble Index was largely unnoticed when it was released, it has achieved acclaim over time. Nico's unprecedented sound and personal style—both recognised for their tenebrous quality—are considered an influence on several artists. Most notably, they served as a musical and visual prototype for the 1980s gothic rock scene. Nico and Cale continued working together, releasing two more studio albums in the same vein—Desertshore (1970) and The End... (1974)—which are now considered parts of a trilogy.

== Background ==
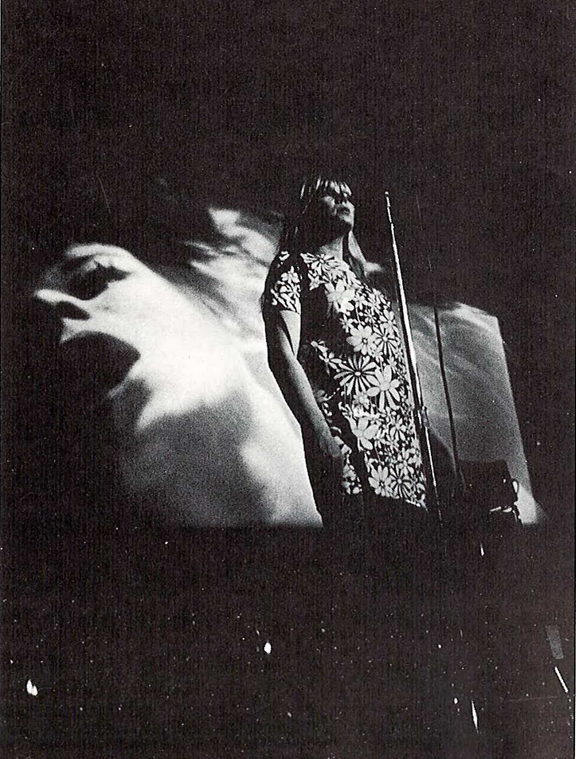
Nico at Andy Warhol's Exploding Plastic Inevitable, where she performed with the Velvet Underground, c. 1967

Nico had made her recording debut in 1965 with the single "I'm Not Sayin'". At Andy Warhol's suggestion, she joined the Velvet Underground as a chanteuse, and sang three tracks on their 1967 album The Velvet Underground & Nico. Nico and the group were regulars at the Factory. However, Lou Reed was reluctant to include her in the band. This, coupled with her desire to be a soloist, made Nico leave the group as casually as she had joined. The band members continued to accompany her as she performed on her own and played on her 1967 solo debut, Chelsea Girl. The folk-pop album included songs by Bob Dylan, Tim Hardin, and Jackson Browne (with whom Nico had a brief affair).

The American singer Jim Morrison, whom Nico later called her "soul brother", encouraged her to write her own songs; this was "a key breakthrough" for her. They were together in California in July and August 1967, often driving into the desert and experimenting with peyote. Morrison, who encouraged Nico to write down her dreams, read the writings of Mary Shelley, William Blake and Samuel Taylor Coleridge to her. He recorded his chemical visions and dreams, using the material for his songs as he imagined the opium-addicted Coleridge had worked. In 1986 Nico said, "He taught me to write songs. I never thought that I could ... He really inspired me a lot. It was like looking in a mirror then." She began writing material and performing it to an intimate audience at Steve Paul's club, the Scene. Nico composed her music on a harmonium bought, according to Richard Witts, from a San Francisco hippie. Her manager, Danny Fields, said that she may have acquired it through the Canadian singer-songwriter Leonard Cohen. The harmonium became her trademark with which "she discovered not only her own artistic voice but a whole new realm of sound".

The Marble Index was produced during a little-studied period of Nico's life. For The Quietus's Matthew Lindsay, "the liminal drift of these years only emphasizes the music's amorphous moorings and lack of precedent." Nico approached Danny Fields in mid-1968 with the desire to make an album and prove herself artistically. Resentful of her beauty, she radically changed her image – dyeing her hair red and wearing black clothes in an effort to distance herself from what had made her a popular fashion model. Cale said, "She hated the idea of being blonde and beautiful, and in some ways she hated being a woman, because she figured all her beauty had brought her was grief ... So The Marble Index was an opportunity for her to prove she was a serious artist, not just this kind of blonde bombshell."

Nico already had the title for the album in mind from The Prelude, William Wordsworth's magnum opus. In the poem Wordsworth contemplates a statue of Isaac Newton in the chapel of Trinity College, Cambridge: "with his prism and silent face / The marble index of a mind for ever / Voyaging through strange seas of Thought, alone." Asked about the significance of this Wordsworth quote, Nico replied, "I sometimes find a little of my own poetry in other poets, yes. Incidentally, or accidentally."

== Recording ==
I didn't think it was going to sell at all. But I thought it would be worth making. Elektra was doing so well at the time that we were able to take risks and experiment. That's what I did, took chances. People think record companies are only in it for the money. And yes, in order to keep doing what we were doing we had to make money. But it's how you spend your money that's important.

— Jac Holzman, Uncut (2015)

Fields relayed Nico's request to Jac Holzman, head of Elektra Records; she then went to Holzman's Broadway office with her harmonium and performed for him. Despite the challenging nature of Nico's music, Holzman agreed to release her album and assigned Frazier Mohawk to produce it, despite Nico and John Cale's desire to work together. He gave her a budget of $10,000 (equivalent to $92,584 in 2025), with a four-day recording schedule at a studio on La Cienega Boulevard in Los Angeles. Fields contacted Cale, who was the album's de facto producer after Mohawk gave him free rein. According to Mohawk, he spent most of the sessions using heroin with Nico. Her drug use is cited as influencing the album's sound; Simon Reynolds wrote, "While it may be a reductive interpretation to regard The Marble Index as the ultimate heroin album, its hunger for narcosis, its frigid expanses, recalls William Burroughs's description of the junkie's quest for a metabolic 'Absolute Zero'."

During the sessions, Nico and Cale "fought at every opportunity"; Nico was "in pain" while recording. Nico and Cale worked on one song at a time, mixing the album as they went, with her voice and harmonium the starting points for each track. Cale said about the recording process:

The harmonium was out of tune with everything. It wasn't even in tune with itself. She insisted on playing it on everything so we had to figure out ways to separate her voice from it as much as possible and then find instrumental voices that would be compatible with the harmonium track ... As an arranger you're usually trying to take the songs and put a structure on them, but what I thought was valuable was when you took the centre out of the track and worked around the central core of the tonality and changes. That left you with a sort of floating free-form tapestry behind what she was doing, which is when things became more abstract.

He also said, "I was pretty much left alone for two days, and I let [Nico] in at the end. I played her [the album] song by song, and she'd burst into tears. 'Oh! It's so beautiful!', 'Oh, it's so beautiful!' You know, this is the same stuff that people tell me, 'Oh! It's so suicidal!'" The original release of The Marble Index included eight of 12 songs Nico recorded. "Roses in the Snow", "Nibelungen", "Sagen die Gelehrten" and "Reve Reveiller" were left off the album. The finished album was barely 30 minutes long, which "was as much apparently as Frazier Mohawk, mixing and sequencing it, could stand without starting to feel suicidal".

== Composition ==
My melodies are from the Middle Ages. They are from my Russian soul. I do not mean this literally, but they are that in my imagination. John Cale said that they are not tonal. They do not come from our key system. They are too old in their arrangement.

— Nico discussing her distinctive songwriting during this period.

The Marble Index's avant-garde style distanced Nico from rock and pop. When an interviewer pointed out the contrast with Chelsea Girl, Nico said that and The Marble Index was "not supposed to be noise, because most pop music to me is noise, alright?" According to Cale, the album "makes more sense in terms of advancing the modern European classical tradition than it does as folk or rock music". With Nico's compositions based around one or two chords, Cale decided to avoid drone and raga (Eastern music common on the West Coast at the time) in favor of a European classical approach in his arrangements. The music has been compared with Germanic folk music, Gregorian chant, medieval music such as madrigals, European avant-garde, Romanticism, and the music of Richard Wagner.

Peter Buckley noted Nico's use of psychedelic drugs during the Summer of Love as an influence on the album's music, and Jim DeRogatis described it as "minimalist bad-trip psychedelia". Frieze called The Marble Index the "bridge between the New York Minimalists of the late 1960s and Brian Eno's ambient records of the late 1970s". The critic Simon Reynolds identified the album as "the rock precedent for isolationism", a term coined by the critic Kevin Martin to describe "a loose network of disenchanted refugees from rock and experimental musicians" that originated the genre known as dark ambient. Isolationism, Reynolds writes, "breaks with all of ambient's feel-good premises" and "evokes an uneasy silence: the uncanny calm before catastrophe, the deathly quiet of aftermath". He listed Aphex Twin (particularly his 1994 album Selected Ambient Works Volume II), Seefeel, David Toop and Max Eastley, among others, as exponents of this style.

According to Uncut, The Marble Index is "one of that rare breed of recordings which, the better part of four decades later, still has no adequate comparison, existing in a genre all its own". The album is considered a proto-goth record. André Escarameia felt the album "anticipated gothic rock by more than a decade due to [its] ethereally darker [ambience] and disturbing sonority." Its soundscape has been described as "bleak", "chilly", "harrowing", and "everything from the sound of someone rapping on a coffin lid to that of being buried alive". In her 1969 Rolling Stone review, Anne Marie Micklo described it as "mood music, with an obscure and elusive text recited over it". Regarding the record's sonority, British author Simon Goddard wrote, "it was on [The Marble Index] that the real sound of Nico was unleashed: a bleak pumping misery which would define her music for the last two decades of her life." Lenny Kaye of Wondering Sound described the album as "Circe-like".

=== Songs ===
"Frozen Warnings"
"Through a pale morning's arctic sunlight glinting dimly off the snow, a bank of violas emits one endless shrill note which eventually becomes electronically distorted by points of ice panning back and forth through the space between your ears, descending and then impossibly ascending in volume and ineluctable intensity until they're almost unbearable through infinitely graceful in their beauty."
– Lester Bangs, "Your Shadow Is Scared of You: An Attempt Not to Be Frightened by Nico", 1978

Nico's lyrics have been described as "mythological and surrealist". According to Spin, "for lyrical inspiration, Nico looked to the Romantic poets and peyote, passions shared with Jim Morrison." Stephen Davis wrote that the album's lyrics stem from the collaboration between Nico and Morrison, and his influence can be seen in song titles such as "Lawn of Dawns", "Frozen Warnings" and "Evening of Light". Morrison offered Nico a model for her writings by showing her how he worked on his poems, indicated by her use of internal rhymes. According to Peter Hogan, some of her lyrics "show a marked debt to Sylvia Plath and to William Blake" and a search for artistic legitimacy. Other critics have found Nico's lyrics to be intriguing. For example, Richie Unterberger wrote: "Nico intones lyrics that don't quite express specific feelings but convey a state of uneasy restlessness." They have also been described as "stark [and] symbolist" and "metaphysical".

The album begins with a gentle piano-and-glockenspiel instrumental before segueing into "Lawn of Dawns", which introduces Nico's harmonium "of undulating motion weaving against her voice". The song is engulfed in "weird clattering and tintinnabulating", while a "dark twangy guitar ... stumbles to a subdued halt in [its] final seconds". It features what may be Nico's first lyrics, inspired by her peyote visions with Jim Morrison: "He blesses you, he blesses me/The day the night caresses,/Caresses you, caresses me,/Can you follow me?/I cannot understand the way I feel/Until I rest on lawns of dawns—/Can you follow me?" Nico explained the peyote-induced experience which inspired the lyrics: "The light of the dawn was a very deep green and I believed I was upside down and the sky was the desert which had become a garden and then the ocean. I do not swim and I was frightened when it was water and more resolved when it was land. I felt embraced by the sky-garden." The lyrics of the next song, "No One Is There", have been described as "in all probability influenced by Jim Morrison" ("Some are calling/Some are sad/Some are calling mad") and are sung over Cale's classical quartet of violas darting in and out of her unusual vocal tempo. "Ari's Song" was dedicated to Nico's young son, Christian Aaron "Ari" Boulogne, her only child with French actor Alain Delon, and has been called "the least-comforting lullaby ever recorded". It begins with the harmonium's clipped, whistling tones as she sings softly, "Sail away/Sail away my little boy". "Facing the Wind" is supported by "Cale-banged piano clusters, scraping of percussion or walls and off-beat tympani"; Nico's voice sounds filtered (possibly through a Leslie speaker), with the "somnambulistic toiling" of her pipe organ accompanied by viola and strident piano.

Side two opens with "Julius Caesar (Memento Hodié)", which lyrically explores myths and gods. It features Nico's low, droning harmonium accompanied by Cale's viola. On "Frozen Warnings", Cale's arrangement harmonically blends with the pipe organ. It is considered Nico's signature song from her collaboration with Cale; Nina Antonia wrote: "Of all the strange and wracked numbers on the record, 'Frozen Warnings' is quintessential Nico; lyrics that convey a sorrowful atmosphere and little comfort in the melody." The album's dreamlike quality end with its last song, "Evening of Light", which has been described as "frighteningly quiet and hypnotizing". Nico sings "Midnight winds are landing at the end of time", with harpsichord and Cale's staccato viola building until the latter gains ground and sways with the tympani's "roar and clatter". The 1991 reissue of The Marble Index also includes the outtakes "Roses in the Snow" and "Nibelungen". In the latter, Nico's vocals are unaccompanied. The full version (with instrumental accompaniment) was included in the 2007 compilation The Frozen Borderline – 1968–1970; according to Dave Thompson of AllMusic, "It rises to equal any of Nico's subsequent performances or compositions."

== Release and aftermath ==
Holzman said "there was no question" of not releasing The Marble Index despite its lack of commercial appeal. He saw it as a work of art, rather than a product. It was released in November 1968 with little promotion. A music video for "Evening of Light", featuring Iggy Pop and the other Stooges, was shot by the art collector François de Menil in 1969. He described the clip as "a sort of pre-MTV promotional item for [The Marble Index]. An early pop promo." De Menil was interested in shooting a short film with Nico, and she agreed with the condition that they would film it in Ann Arbor, Michigan, Pop's hometown, and that he would be featured in it. Dave Thompson described the clip as follows: "It was shot in a cornfield behind [Pop's house], barren and stubbly in the late winter chill, Nico in white and windswept, Pop in whiteface, manic and agitated, caressing and crushing the mannequin parts that littered the field, while a wooden cross is raised before them and set ablaze as night falls." Elektra Records—who had not agreed to finance the project—rejected the music video, as did "any other media outlets that de Menil approached".

The Marble Index "failed to challenge the supremacy of Nashville Skyline, From Elvis in Memphis, Abbey Road and Diana Ross & the Supremes Join the Temptations on the album charts of 1969". Although Holzman was pleased with the album, Nico's longevity with the label was unlikely; he was increasingly concerned with her heroin use and she had a difficult, irresponsible attitude. Nico left the United States before she was officially released from Elektra, after a violent incident in a New York City bar. Biographers refer to her leaving the U.S. as an exile; Nico said, "When you live in a dangerous place, you also become increasingly dangerous. You might just wind up in jail."

In London, Nico recorded two more albums with Cale in the same vein: Desertshore (1970) and The End... (1974), now considered parts of a trilogy. The album was reissued as a CD in 1991 with two bonus tracks. Songs from The Marble Index have been included in Nico compilations including The Classic Years (1998), Femme Fatale (2002), and The Frozen Borderline – 1968–1970 (2007). For Elektra's 60th anniversary, "Frozen Warnings" was released as a single on October 25, 2010, with "No One Is There" as its B-side.

== Critical reception ==
Professional ratings
Review scores
Source	Rating
About.com	4.5/5 stars
AllMusic	3/5 stars
The Great Rock Discography	7/10
MusicHound	4/5
NME	7/10
The Rolling Stone Album Guide	3.5/5 stars
Sputnikmusic (staff)	5/5 stars
Virgin Encyclopedia of Popular Music	4/5 stars

Although The Marble Index was generally unnoticed when it was released, it was praised by the countercultural East Village Other and International Times; however, most critics found "her desolate soundscapes inaccessible." Anne Marie Micklo of Rolling Stone gave the album a positive review, calling side two "a really worthwhile venture into musical infinity". A cult following emerged around it, which included music journalist Lester Bangs, who wrote in a 1978 article entitled "Your Shadow Is Scared of You: An Attempt Not to Be Frightened by Nico": "The Marble Index is the greatest piece of 'avant-garde classical', 'serious' music of the last half of the 20th century so far." Although Bangs praised the album, he also wrote that it "scared the shit out of [him]" and described the listening experience as "self-torture".

The album's rise to acclaim was slow; for the most part, audiences have remained nonplussed. According to Simon Goddard, most critics regard it as "[Nico's] defining avant-garde masterpiece". The Rolling Stone Album Guide considers The Marble Index the point in Nico's discography where "the difficult listening starts", and the album is "pretty amazing for it". Anthony Carew of About.com called it "a suite of rootless songs written with little precedent" and "an astonishing haunting, the work of a woman who, even whilst alive, seemed a lot like a ghost". Anthony Thornton of NME called it an "artistic triumph": "Bleak but beautiful, this album remains the most fitting embodiment of her doomed glamour." According to Spin, "Few records, before or since, have sounded lonelier, spookier, or more desolate". Trouser Press described it as "one of the scariest records ever made".

AllMusic's Richie Unterberger awarded the album three stars out of five, describing Nico's songwriting as "singularly morose". Dorian Lynskey wrote for The Guardian that The Marble Index forces the distinction between art and entertainment, comparing it to the "terrifying" output of musician Scott Walker (particularly the album Tilt), painter Mark Rothko and writer Philip Roth. Simon Reynolds described the record as "psychic landscapes, glittering in their immaculate, lifeless majesty of someone cut off from the thawing warmth of human contact and fellowship" and "religious music for nihilists". Sputnikmusic's Louis Arp was less enthusiastic, finding the music "pretentious" and "agitating" in the aura it evoked while deeming Nico's lyrics repetitive and meaningless. Village Voice critic Robert Christgau said, "While The Velvet Underground and Nico plus Chelsea Girl convinced me that Nico had charisma; The Marble Index plus Desertshore convince me that she's a fool."

== Legacy ==
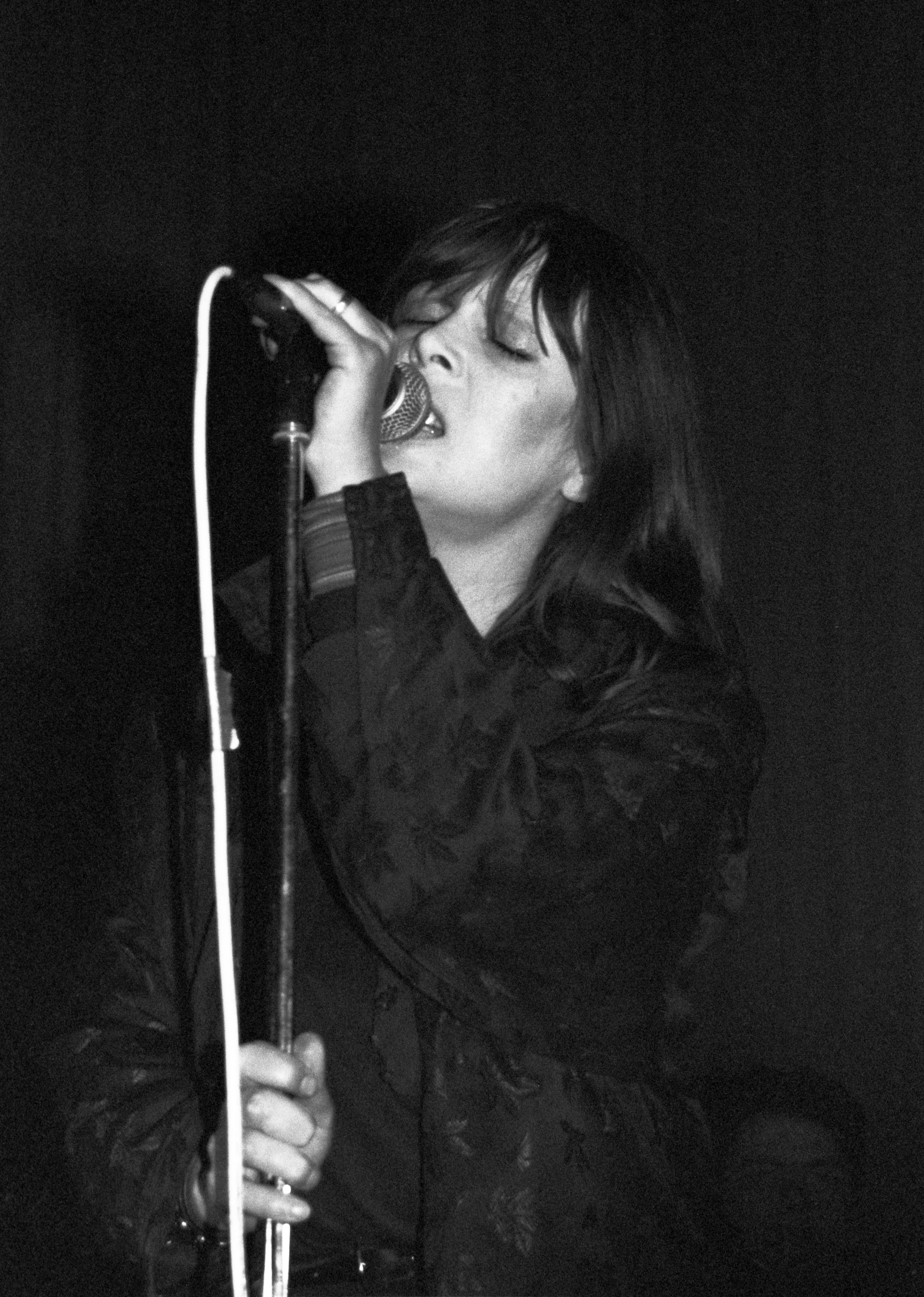
Nico performing at the University of Wales, Lampeter, 1985.

The Marble Index has a sound which distinguishes it from the musical landscape of the 1960s. Anthony Thornton of NME called it "a stark, oppressive opus that has influenced everyone from PJ Harvey to the Duke Spirit. According to Spin, "[The Marble Index] set the tone for decades of music to come – Arthur Russell, Dead Can Dance, Fennesz, Zola Jesus, Grouper, pretty much every metal band that ever used a harpsichord – but few followers have sailed so near to the edge of the abyss with such chillingly beautiful results." The Canadian rock band The Marble Index is named after Nico's album.

Simon Reynolds wrote about a female rocker he called the Ice Queen: "Ice is the opposite of all that women are supposed to be: warm, flowing, giving, receptive. Like Lady Macbeth, the Ice Queen has unsexed herself, dammed up her lachrymal and lactation ducts. She offers cold, not comfort. Her hard surfaces can't be penetrated. She is an island, an iceberg." In The Marble Index Nico took this persona (originally embodied by Grace Slick) even further, making a fetish of disconnection and "[dreaming] of a sort of negative nirvana". According to Dazed, this persona has influenced Siouxsie Sioux, Zola Jesus, and Björk. The lattermost's 2011 album, Biophilia, was described by Rolling Stone as The Marble Index's "haunted digital sister". The influence of The Marble Index can also be found in the music of Laurel Halo.

"Frozen Warnings" was included in Toby Creswell's compendium 1001 Songs; Creswell wrote, "Just as she had done with The Velvet Underground & Nico, the singer put a new tone into music." In 2013 John Cale curated Life Along the Borderline: A Tribute to Nico at the Brooklyn Academy of Music, which featured songs from The Marble Index and other Nico albums performed by Peaches, Yeasayer, Sharon Van Etten, Meshell Ndegeocello and Cale. Primal Scream's Bobby Gillespie has listed The Marble Index as one of his favorite albums and stated that it was a "huge influence" in the making of their 1991 album Screamadelica. Jamie Stewart of Xiu Xiu, has cited the album as an inspiration, writing, "it completely changed my entire view of what it was possible to do in music", and "you could never mistake it for anything else, which is an astounding thing to be able to do." The album was also a favorite of American musician Elliott Smith.

The Marble Index, which influenced the gothic rock of the late 1970s and early 1980s, has been called "the first goth album". Ian Astbury of the Cult and Peter Murphy of Bauhaus have cited Nico as an influence. She lived in the United Kingdom when the gothic rock scene was developing, with supporting acts including the Sisters of Mercy and Gene Loves Jezebel. According to Murphy, "Nico was gothic, but she was Mary Shelley gothic to everyone else's Hammer horror-film gothic. They both did Frankenstein, but Nico's was real." David Dalton of Gadfly Online disagreed: "Some say she is the originator of Goth, but this is just silly, a misunderstanding, a pastiche. Nico has no heirs. She is a discrete entity."

The album's release coincided with a change in Nico's look, when she adopted what has been called a "gothic horror princess" persona and "switched from dyed blonde to dark henna and started wearing black, heavy fabrics and boots". As a result, in addition to being a musical prototype for the goth subculture, Nico became a visual one as well. Claire Marie Healy wrote, "Nico's visual statement of these years speaks of the power that comes with creating a new persona for yourself" and she described the singer as "the first ever goth girl". By the early 1980s, many women began to dress like Nico; nicknamed "Nico-teens", they were the first goth girls, encouraging a cult following for the singer.

=== Accolades ===
Publication	Country	Accolade	Year	Rank
About.com	United States	Top 30 Alternative Albums of the 1960s	2010	25
Spin	United States	The Top 100 Alternative Albums of the 1960s	2013	14
GQ	United Kingdom	The 100 Coolest Albums in the World Right Now!	2005	23
The Guardian	United Kingdom	1000 Albums to Hear Before You Die	2007	*
Paul Morley	United Kingdom	Words and Music, 5 × 100 Greatest Albums of All Time	2003	*
Sunday Herald	Scotland	The 103 Best Albums Ever, Honest	2001	*
Rock & Folk	France	The Best Albums from 1963 to 1999	1999	*
Rock & Folk	France	555 Albums from 1954-2014	2014	*
Gilles Verlant	France	300+ Best Albums in the History of Rock	2013	*
Mucchio Selvaggio	Italy	100 Best Albums by Decade	2002	83
(*) designates lists that are unordered.

== Track listing ==
All tracks are written by Nico.

Side one
No.	Title	Length
1.	"Prelude"	1:00
2.	"Lawns of Dawns"	3:11
3.	"No One Is There"	3:37
4.	"Ari's Song"	3:21
5.	"Facing the Wind"	4:55
Total length:		16:06

Side two
No.	Title	Length
1.	"Julius Caesar (Memento Hodié)"	5:02
2.	"Frozen Warnings"	4:02
3.	"Evening of Light"	5:40
Total length:		14:42 30:48

1991 reissue bonus tracks
No.	Title	Length
9.	"Roses in the Snow"	4:10
10.	"Nibelungen"	2:43
Total length:		37:41

== Personnel ==
Credits adapted from The Marble Index's liner notes.

- Nico – words and music
- John Cale – arrangements
- Frazier Mohawk – producer
- Jac Holzman – production supervisor
- John Haeny – engineer
- Guy Webster – photography
- Robert L. Heimall – design
- William S. Harvey – art direction
- David Anderle, Danny Fields – friends

== See also ==
- Songs about death
- Neo-Medieval music
- Gothic fashion
- Gothic art
- Gothic fiction
