= Frazier Mohawk =

American record producer (1941–2012)

- Born: Barry Friedman; December 12, 1941
- Died: June 2, 2012 (aged 70)
- Citizenship: American
- Education: Happy Valley School
- Occupations: Record producer Photographer; Publicist; Circus owner Farmer

Frazier Mohawk (born Barry Friedman, December 12, 1941 – June 2, 2012) was an American record producer and sometime photographer, publicist, circus owner, and farmer.

== Life and career ==
Friedman attended the Happy Valley School in California. He then spent time working in circuses and as a photographer, living in France for a period. In 1962 he returned to Los Angeles, becoming a radio show producer. He also became a publicist, handling the press conferences for The Beatles around their Hollywood Bowl performance in 1964.

He went on to work for the Troubadour club, becoming friendly with Stephen Stills, and helping him put together a new group, which became Buffalo Springfield. Friedman was driving the car with Stills and Richie Furay which passed on Sunset Boulevard the hearse carrying Neil Young and Bruce Palmer from Canada, a meeting which led to the formation of the band. As their de facto manager, he got the Springfield to tour with the Byrds, subsequently becoming involved in the Byrds’ own work. He also started to work as a producer, with Paul Butterfield, Kaleidoscope, "Spider" John Koerner and Willie Murphy, the Holy Modal Rounders and others. Notably, he produced Nico’s album with John Cale, The Marble Index. During this time in the late-sixties, Barry Friedman also worked as an A&R man for the record label Elektra in Los Angeles.

By this time, Friedman had decided to change his name to Frazier Mohawk. Around the same time the stresses of living in the city led him, supported and funded by Elektra boss Jac Holzman, to build a studio and mountain retreat at Paxton Lodge in northern California. This was a centre for creative endeavours but, according to Holzman, relatively little usable output. Mohawk also met and married singer Sandra Hurvitz, who had previously recorded with Frank Zappa, and who now changed her name to Essra Mohawk. He subsequently produced her second album (and first as Essra Mohawk) entitled Primordial Lovers on the Reprise label, which Rolling Stone magazine in 1977 proclaimed as "one of the best 25 albums ever made" in their top 500 list of best albums.

By the early 1970s, burned out by the music business, he moved to Canada, producing a few obscure acts and becoming seriously ill for a period. After his recovery he established and ran his own travelling circus for several years. Eventually he settled at Puck’s Farm north of Toronto, developing it as an attraction for families, and also including a recording studio.

He died from liver disease in 2012, at the age of 70.
