= Eagles (album) =

Studio album by the Eagles
- Released: June 1, 1972
- Recorded: February 1972
- Studios: Olympic, London; "Nightingale" recorded at Wally Heider Recording, Hollywood, Los Angeles
- Genres: Country rock; folk rock; rock and roll
- Length: 37:19
- Label: Asylum
- Producer: Glyn Johns

The Eagles chronology
Eagles (1972)	Desperado (1973)

Singles from Eagles
- 1. "Take It Easy" Released: May 1, 1972; 2. "Witchy Woman" Released: August 1, 1972; 3. "Peaceful Easy Feeling" Released: December 1, 1972

Eagles is the debut studio album by American rock band the Eagles. The album was recorded at London's Olympic Studios with producer Glyn Johns and released on June 1, 1972, by Asylum Records. It was an immediate success for the then-new band, reaching No. 22 on the Billboard 200 and achieving a platinum certification from the Recording Industry Association of America (RIAA). Three singles were released from the album, each reaching the Top 40 of the Billboard Hot 100: "Take It Easy" (number 12), "Witchy Woman" (number 9), and "Peaceful Easy Feeling" (number 22). The band, starting with this album, played a major role in popularizing the country rock sound.

The album was ranked number 368 in the 2012 edition of Rolling Stone magazine's list of the "500 Greatest Albums of All Time", and at number 207 in the 2020 reboot of the list. The single "Take It Easy" is part of the Rock and Roll Hall of Fame "500 Songs That Shaped Rock and Roll".

== Background ==
In 1971, the band had just been formed and signed by David Geffen, who then sent them to Aspen, Colorado, to develop as a band. For their first album, Glenn Frey wanted Glyn Johns to be the producer as they liked several rock albums engineered by Johns, including albums by the Rolling Stones, the Who, and Led Zeppelin. Geffen invited Johns to see the band perform at a club called Tulagi in Boulder, Colorado, in December 1971. Johns, however, was not impressed by the band's live performance, thinking that it sounded confused and lacking in cohesion – Frey wanted it to be a rock & roll band while Bernie Leadon wanted a country feel – so Johns declined to produce the album.

Johns was persuaded by Geffen to have a second listen in a rehearsal setting in Los Angeles, but Johns did not change his opinion of the band until all four started singing harmonies with acoustic guitar on a ballad written by bassist Randy Meisner, "Take the Devil". Johns was impressed by their harmony singing, and later said: "There it was, the sound. Extraordinary blend of voices, wonderful harmony sound, just stunning." In the albums he produced for the Eagles, Johns emphasized the vocal blend of the band, and he has been credited with shaping the band into "the country-rock band with those high-flyin' harmonies."

== Recording ==
The band went to London, where they spent two weeks recording the album at the Olympic Studios. The album cost $125,000 to produce. Johns tried to introduce a more acoustic sound in the recording and concentrated on the vocal blend and arrangements. There were, however, frequent disagreements over the sound of the band between the producer and Frey and Don Henley during the making of the album. Frey and Henley wanted a rougher rock and roll sound, while Johns was interested in using Bernie Leadon's banjo and Randy Meisner's bass to create a more country sound. Frey later admitted, "[Johns] was the key to our success in a lot of ways", but added: "We just didn't want to make another limp-wristed L.A. country-rock record." Johns also instituted a no-drug and no-alcohol rule that Frey, but not Henley, was unhappy about.

Three of the songs recorded in London feature Frey on lead vocals, another three with Meisner and two with Leadon. The chirping sound at the start of the song by Leadon and Meisner, "Earlybird", was taken from a sound effect library. On "Take It Easy", Johns convinced Leadon to play double-time banjo on the song, a touch that Johns felt made the song different.

Originally, Henley co-wrote and sang one song on the album, "Witchy Woman". Later, a further track, "Nightingale", was recorded in Los Angeles after Geffen and manager Elliot Roberts listened to the tape of the album and decided that it needed another song with Henley on lead vocals. Johns had previously recorded a few takes of the song in London, but abandoned it as he felt it did not work. Geffen tried to get the song recorded with another production team, and Johns, angered by the attempt to record "Nightingale" behind his back, then re-recorded the song with the band at Wally Heider's Studio 3 in Hollywood. Even though Johns judged this recording unsatisfactory, it was included in the album. "Nightingale" was originally going to be the non-LP B side to "Take it Easy". By adding "Nightingale" to the album track list, the Frey-sung track "Get You in the Mood" was then dropped from the track listing and made the non-LP B-side for the first single.This gave Frey three lead vocals instead of four on the final album and Henley two.

The album was slated for Quadraphonic release and even given a Quadraphonic catalog number, but it was never released in that format.

== Artwork ==
The album artwork was created by album cover artist Gary Burden with photography by Henry Diltz. The album was initially designed as a gatefold album that would further open up into a poster; however, Geffen thought it would be confusing and glued it together so that it would not open, and the gatefold image of the band members at Joshua Tree then became orientated the wrong side up. In the documentary History of the Eagles, Glenn Frey revealed that the band was all on peyote when the gatefold picture of the band members was shot in Joshua Tree National Park.

== Critical reception ==
Professional ratings
Review scores
Source	Rating
AllMusic	3/5 stars
Christgau's Record Guide	B
Disc	2/4 stars
Encyclopedia of Popular Music	3/5 stars
The Great Rock Discography	5/10
MusicHound	2.5/5
Rolling Stone	favorable
The Rolling Stone Album Guide	3.5/5 stars
Sputnikmusic	4/5

Reviewing in 1972, Bud Scoppa of Rolling Stone believed the Eagles had "distinguished" country-rock backgrounds and said the album is "right behind Jackson Browne's record as the best first album this year. And I could be persuaded to remove the word 'first' from that statement". In Christgau's Record Guide: Rock Albums of the Seventies (1981), Robert Christgau felt that the band wrote good songs, but he was unsure about the authenticity of their country roots so what they produced was "suave and synthetic-brilliant, but false".

Allmusic's William Ruhlmann, in his retrospective review, sums up the album as balanced in terms of songwriting but notes that the three hit singles were sung by Frey and Henley, who would later go on to dominate the band. Rolling Stone listed it as number 368 on their 2012 edition of the 500 greatest albums of all time list with the comment that the album "created a new template for laid-back L.A. country-rock style". It rose to number 207 in the 2020 edition of the list. It was included in Robert Dimery's 1001 Albums You Must Hear Before You Die.

Ultimate Classic Rock critic Sterling Whitaker rated the non-single album track "Most of Us Are Sad" as being among the Eagles' 10 most underrated songs.

== Commercial performance ==
The album debuted on the US Billboard 200 chart at number 102 in its first week of release, rising at number 22 in its sixth week on the chart. The album was certified platinum by the Recording Industry Association of America (RIAA) on March 20, 2001, for shipment of 1 million copies in the United States.

== Track listing ==
Side one
No.	Title	Writer(s)	Lead vocals	Length
1.	"Take It Easy"	Jackson Browne; Glenn Frey	Frey	3:34
2.	"Witchy Woman"	Don Henley; Bernie Leadon	Henley	4:10
3.	"Chug All Night"	Frey	Frey	3:18
4.	"Most of Us Are Sad"	Frey	Randy Meisner	3:38
5.	"Nightingale"	Browne	Henley	4:08

Side two
No.	Title	Writer(s)	Lead vocals	Length
1.	"Train Leaves Here This Morning"	Gene Clark; Leadon	Leadon	4:13
2.	"Take the Devil"	Meisner	Meisner	4:04
3.	"Earlybird"	Leadon; Meisner	Leadon	3:03
4.	"Peaceful Easy Feeling"	Jack Tempchin	Frey	4:20
5.	"Tryin'"	Meisner	Meisner	2:54

== Personnel ==
Personnel taken from Eagles liner notes.

Eagles

- Bernie Leadon – vocals, guitar, banjo
- Glenn Frey – vocals, guitar, slide guitar
- Randy Meisner – vocals, bass guitar
- Don Henley – vocals, drums

Production

- Glyn Johns – producer, engineer
- Gary Burden – art direction, design
- Henry Diltz – photography

== Charts ==
Chart (1972)	Peak position
Canada Top Albums/CDs (RPM)	13
US Billboard 200	22

== Certifications ==
Region	Certification	Certified units/sales
Canada (Music Canada)	Gold	50,000^{^}
United Kingdom (BPI)	Silver	60,000^{^}
United States (RIAA)	Platinum	1,000,000^{^}
^{^} Shipments figures based on certification alone.
