= Randy Meisner =

American musician (1946–2023)

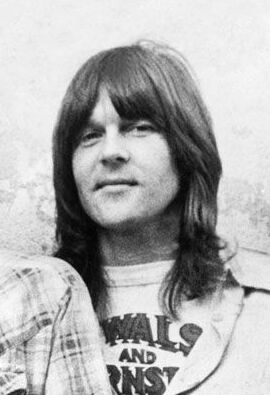
- Meisner in 1974

Background information
- Born: Randall Herman Meisner; March 8, 1946; Scottsbluff, Nebraska, U.S.
- Died: July 26, 2023 (aged 77) Los Angeles, California, U.S.
- Genres: Rock; country rock; hard rock; pop rock
- Occupations: Musician; singer-songwriter
- Instruments: Bass guitar; vocals
- Years active: 1961–2008; 2020
- Labels: Asylum; Epic; Rev-Ola; York
- Formerly of: Eagles; Poco; Rick Nelson & the Stone Canyon Band; The Poor; Meisner, Swan & Rich; Black Tie; Drivin' Dynamics; World Classic Rockers
- Spouses: Jennifer Lee Barton (m. 1963; div. 1981) Lana Rae Graham (m. 1996; died 2016)

Randall Herman Meisner (March 8, 1946 – July 26, 2023) was an American musician, singer, songwriter, and founding member of both Eagles and Poco. Throughout his professional musical career, both as group member and session musician, his main role was that of bassist and backing vocalist. He co-wrote and provided lead vocals on the Eagles' hit song "Take It to the Limit".

== Early life ==
Randall Herman Meisner was born in Scottsbluff, Nebraska, on March 8, 1946, the second child and only son of farmers Herman (1911–1995) and Emilie (née Haun) Meisner (1911–2010). All four of Randy's grandparents were Volga German immigrants. He had an elder sister, Carol, who died in 2005. He recalled that his mother was always singing around the house. His maternal grandfather, George Haun, was a violin teacher.

The Meisner family grew corn, beans, alfalfa, and sugar beets on their farm. Randy developed an interest in the guitar at the age of 10, after seeing Elvis Presley perform on The Ed Sullivan Show. Randy began taking lessons and playing in local bands. While attending Scottsbluff High School, one of Randy's teachers suggested he take up the bass. "I loved R&B and the bass players on the Motown stuff were great. They really inspired me. I can't read music. Once I learn a part, it's there. My bass playing came real naturally."

== Career ==
=== Early career (1961–1968) ===
Meisner played bass and sang with a local band named The Dynamics (later The Drivin' Dynamics) from 1961 to 1965. Their first paying job was performing in the dance hall at Little Moon Lake in Torrington, northeast of Cheyenne, Wyoming, in December 1961. They played there regularly through 1962. In late 1962, The Drivin' Dynamics released their first record, a four-song EP with Meisner singing lead vocals on Sam Cooke's "You Send Me". It was pressed locally with only 500 copies released. In August 1965, The Dynamics signed a record deal with Sully Records from Amarillo, north of Lubbock, Texas. They recorded three songs, with Meisner singing lead on two: "One Of These Days" and "So Fine". "So Fine" was released as a single, and sold well regionally and in the Southeastern U.S. Early in 1966, Meisner moved to California with a band named The Soul Survivors, later to be renamed The Poor (because, as Don Felder later said, "that is what they became").

It was a hardscrabble existence, as Meisner later recalled: "I never had a car, I had to walk. I sold the Los Angeles Free Press on Sunset and Highland. I made about five bucks a day." The Poor was managed by Charlie Greene and Brian Stone, who also managed Buffalo Springfield and Sonny & Cher. The band released several singles on Loma Records, York, and Decca Records in 1966 and 1967 with limited success. Loma was a subsidiary of Warner Bros. and had offices in the same building. In February 1967, The Poor recorded "She's Got the Time, She's Got the Changes", written by Tom Shipley (later of Brewer & Shipley fame) while he was a staff writer for A&M Records. Three of the singles were produced by Barry Friedman (a.k.a. "Frazier Mohawk") and recorded at Gold Star Studios in Hollywood. The band performed on "Study in Motion #1", which was featured in the 1967 Jack Nicholson film Hell's Angels on Wheels.

In the summer of 1967, The Poor was booked for two weeks at the Salvation Club in New York City opening for The Jimi Hendrix Experience. Although the band did get to play a few times, it was not the opportunity its members had hoped it would be; they had to threaten their management in order to get money for plane tickets back to Los Angeles. Rev-Ola released a CD of The Poor's music in 2003, which included one song written by Meisner, "Come Back Baby".

=== Poco and the Stone Canyon Band (1968–1970) ===
In May 1968, after having auditioned with Timothy B. Schmit, Meisner joined Poco (originally named Pogo) with Rusty Young, and former Buffalo Springfield members Richie Furay and Jim Messina. Meisner appears on the group's first album, Pickin' Up the Pieces, but quit the band shortly before the record was released. His exit was the result of his anger at being excluded from participation in the final mix playback sessions for the album; only Messina and Furay were to be involved in completing production. His image was removed from the painting on the album's cover and replaced with a dog. His bass parts and backing vocals were left in the final mix, but his lead vocals were removed and new versions were sung by George Grantham.

In April 1969, Meisner joined Rick Nelson's Stone Canyon Band, and persuaded Nelson and producer John Boylan to hire his former bandmates from The Poor, Allen Kemp (guitar) and Pat Shanahan (drums). The pedal steel guitarist Tom Brumley, previously of Buck Owens' band, completed the group. Meisner appears on In Concert at the Troubadour, 1969 and Rudy The Fifth. He is also featured in Easy to Be Free, a documentary of the Stone Canyon Band's 1969 tour, directed by Rick Nelson's brother David. The film was eventually broadcast on U.S. television in 1973. Meisner co-produced In Concert at the Troubadour with Rick Nelson. Although he did not perform on Nelson's Garden Party, he did co-author one of the album's tracks, "I Wanna Be With You". Meisner continued to support himself as a session performer, playing bass on two tracks of James Taylor's Sweet Baby James album ("Country Road" and "Blossom"), recorded in December 1969. In the same month, he played bass on several tracks for Waylon Jennings' 1970 album Singer of Sad Songs, recorded at RCA Victor Studio in Hollywood.

Meisner returned to Nebraska in the spring of 1970 after a difficult tour of Europe with Rick Nelson and the Stone Canyon Band. He began working at Frank Implement Company, the local John Deere tractor dealership. At night, he played in a band, Goldrush, which featured Stephen A. Love (later to become a member of New Riders of the Purple Sage). Later that year, with Rick Nelson's encouragement, he returned to Los Angeles to resume his career. He worked to establish Goldrush while playing in the Stone Canyon Band and performing on sessions for John Stewart and Compton & Batteau. By mid-1971, he was recruited by John Boylan to become active in Linda Ronstadt's roster of backing musicians, which included Don Henley, Glenn Frey, and Bernie Leadon.

=== Eagles (1971–1977) ===
In September 1971, Meisner, Henley, Frey, and Leadon formed the Eagles. The band signed with David Geffen's new label, Asylum Records, and released their eponymous debut album in 1972. While he usually played the bass and sang backing vocals for the Eagles, he wrote, co-wrote, and/or sang lead on songs on each of the group's first five albums, most notably "Take It to the Limit", the band's first million-selling single, and the third song released from One of These Nights. Other songs he wrote and sang lead on include "Try and Love Again", "Is it True?", "Take the Devil", and "Tryin'". He wrote "Certain Kind of Fool" with Frey and Henley, and sang lead.

During the 1976/77 tour in support of the album Hotel California, Meisner suffered from ill health and exhaustion while the band toured frequently for over 11 months. Meisner also preferred not to be the center of attention, and said: "I was always kind of shy... They wanted me to stand in the middle of the stage to sing 'Take It to the Limit', but I liked to be out of the spotlight." The band was starting to feel the strain of a long tour, and Meisner was unhappy. His stomach ulcers had flared up, and his marriage was also gradually disintegrating. During the tour, he had been arguing with fellow member Glenn Frey about his signature song, "Take It to the Limit"; Meisner was struggling to hit the crucial high notes in the song. At their show in Knoxville, Tennessee, Meisner, who had stayed up late and caught the flu, decided to skip performing the song as an encore; Frey and Meisner then became involved in an angry physical confrontation backstage. After the altercation, Meisner was frozen out from the band, and Meisner later said: "That was the end... I really felt like I was a member of the group, not a part of it." Meisner decided to leave the group after the final date of the tour, and returned to Nebraska to be with his family. His last performance was in East Troy, Wisconsin, on September 3, 1977. The band replaced Meisner with the same musician who had succeeded him in Poco, Timothy B. Schmit, after agreeing that Schmit was the only candidate.

Meisner formally quit the band in September 1977, citing "exhaustion". On the subject of his abrupt resignation from the band, Meisner later said, "All that stuff and all the arguing amongst the Eagles is over now. Well, at least for me." It is disputed whether Meisner actually refused to sing "Take it to the Limit"; according to a concert review, he did perform "Take it to the Limit", which was on the regular setlist; after two encores, Meisner refused to go out for a third encore that the audience wanted.

=== Post-Eagles (1978–2020) ===
After leaving the Eagles, Meisner went on to release solo albums in 1978 (Randy Meisner) and 1980 (One More Song). He said that his 1978 album, which he co-produced with Alan Brackett, was scattershot and not "conceptualized to its best". It only featured one song co-written by Meisner, a new arrangement of "Take It to the Limit" and he only played bass on one song, a cover of The Drifters' "Save the Last Dance for Me". He explained that "Elektra had a 'leaving members clause' and I had to record an album for them before I was able to do what I wanted." One More Song in 1980 was produced by Val Garay and featured backing vocals by his former Eagles bandmates Don Henley and Glenn Frey on the Jack Tempchin-composed title track. Meisner co-wrote six of the album's nine songs, two, including the 1981 Top-20 single "Hearts On Fire" with Eric Kaz, and four with Kaz and Wendy Waldman.

Throughout the early 1980s, he toured with his band, Randy Meisner & the Silverados. The 1981 band included Greg Palmer on bass, Todd Smith on guitar, Sterling Smith on keyboards, Don Francisco (not the Christian singer of the same name) on percussion and background vocals, and Therese Heston on background vocals. In 1982, he released another album on CBS (Randy Meisner), recorded at Kendun Recorders in Burbank, California, and produced by Mike Flicker, best known for his work with Heart. Several members of Heart, including the Wilson sisters, played and/or sang on the Randy Meisner album. The revamped Silverados included Dixon House on keyboards, Denny Carmassi on drums, Tom Erak on bass, and John Corey on guitar, as well as Sterling Smith from the earlier band. The album featured a Top-20 hit, "Never Been in Love", composed by Craig Bickhardt.

In 1985, Meisner became part of an all-star band, Black Tie, composed of Jimmy Griffin (of Bread) and Billy Swan. Black Tie's cover of Buddy Holly's "Learning the Game" became a hit on U.S. country radio. Respected session musician Blondie Chaplin and former Eagles member Bernie Leadon joined the band on their U.S. tour in early 1986. The band released one album together in 1990, When the Night Falls. Jimmy Griffin departed and was replaced by Charlie Rich Jr. The band was renamed Meisner, Rich & Swan. Alternatively known as Meisner, Swan & Rich, the trio toured extensively in the 1990s and recorded an album. Unfortunately, the album, which was released on September 11, 2001, failed to garner much attention at the time.

From 1987 to 1989, Meisner formed a band and toured with former Firefall singer-songwriter Rick Roberts, called the Roberts-Meisner Band (Roberts had previously been a Burrito Brother with Bernie Leadon, notably on 1971's The Flying Burrito Brothers). The Roberts-Meisner Band's drummer was Ron Grinel, who also played with Dan Fogelberg, Carole King, and the Souther-Hillman-Furay Band. Also in the band were Bray Ghiglia on guitar, flute, saxophone, and keyboards and Cary Park on lead guitar. Roberts reports that the band recorded "at least half a dozen" songs, but that record company interest was not as great as they had expected.

In 1989 and 1990, Meisner reunited with Poco for the Legacy album and tour. "Call It Love" was a Top-20 single in the U.S. Meisner sang lead on the Richard Marx-composed "Nothin' to Hide", which also sold well for the band.

Meisner expressed disappointment and hurt at being excluded from the Eagles' 1994 "resumption" tour Hell Freezes Over. In an interview with the television program American Journal, Meisner said he had contacted the band's manager, Irving Azoff, when he heard rumors of the band reforming, but was brushed off by Azoff. "You'd think that you would be mentioned if you helped with six of the albums, but they act as though I never even played with them," Meisner said at the time. Meisner also asked the band if he could sit in with them at their Millennium Concert at the Staples Center in Los Angeles on New Year's Eve 1999, but said he was rebuffed; however, he also said that he held no resentment towards Henley and Frey.

The Eagles' 1998 appearance at the New York City induction ceremony for the Rock and Roll Hall of Fame featured all seven past and present members of the Eagles. They performed "Take It Easy" and "Hotel California". His successor, Timothy B. Schmit, paid tribute to Meisner in his acceptance speech.

Meisner reunited with the Drivin' Dynamics for a performance in 2000, when the band and Meisner as a solo performer were inducted into the Nebraska Music Hall of Fame. In the 2000s, he performed as a part of the World Classic Rockers touring group. After suffering severe chest pains and being hospitalized in August 2004, Meisner cut back on his touring schedule. He was invited by the Eagles to take part in their History of the Eagles world tour in 2013, but he declined due to health issues. In September 2018, during the Eagles North American leg, he was acknowledged for being at a concert at The Forum in Inglewood, California. The three-night stand was released as Live from the Forum MMXVIII. Meisner was a special guest at two Richie Furay livestream concerts. On August 27, 2020, Meisner appeared (via video) from his home, singing back-up harmony with Furay and his band on the Buffalo Springfield song "For What It's Worth".

On October 30, 2020, Meisner made a second remote appearance, singing background vocals with Furay's band on the Poco song "Pickin' up the Pieces". He was a special guest on the November 28, 2020, Joe Walsh's Old Fashioned Rock n' Roll Radio Show.

== Personal life ==
Meisner married twice. He married his high-school girlfriend, Jennifer Lee Barton, in 1963, and they had a son, Dana Scott Meisner, in November 1963. Randy and Jennifer had two more children, twins Heather Leigh and Eric Shane Meisner, born in May 1970, before divorcing in 1981. Randy Meisner later married his girlfriend of 12 years, Lana Rae, in November 1996. Lana Rae died on March 6, 2016.

Many people who met and worked with Meisner remarked on his kindness. Don Felder, James Taylor, and Rick Roberts described Meisner as being one of the nicest people with whom they had ever worked. Felder said, "He was a wonderful Midwestern guy with a great heart and a loving soul." Henry Diltz, who photographed Meisner extensively with the Eagles and in the early 1980s during Meisner's solo career, said, "Randy Meisner was a very gentle soul. A quiet and friendly guy. No aggressive vibe at all. Very sweet. He was so there and open." Meisner's shyness was also brought up and may have caused him some difficulty as a performer at times. "Randy was extremely uncomfortable with so-called superstardom," Don Henley told author Marc Eliot.

=== Impostor case ===
A man named Lewis Peter "Buddy" Morgan started impersonating Meisner in 1988. Morgan had previously been charged in Las Vegas with impersonating Don Henley, but he skipped on his bail. Morgan's identity was not conclusively determined until 1997. Morgan was arrested again in 1998 and spent 16 months in prison. After his release, Morgan continued his charade, and was still doing so as of 2009. He often tried to use Meisner's identity to rent hotel rooms in Reno, Nevada. Morgan was not as successful with the ruse as before, since the city's hotels had notified one another of the impostor. Some people are not as familiar with Meisner's appearance as those of the more prominent and public Eagles members, and Morgan used that fact to con musical instrument manufacturers and retailers, casino owners, and women.

=== Health and legal issues ===
Meisner reportedly struggled with periodic alcohol dependency from the late 1960s onward, especially during his tenure with the Eagles, as he tried to deal with his new-found fame. After having minor heart attacks in 2004, he was forced to cut back on touring. As his health continued to deteriorate, he eventually stopped performing. His last known public performance was in 2008 in Naples, Florida.

In March 2013, Meisner suffered another health scare after losing consciousness in his California home. A piece of food obstructed his breathing while he was eating, and he was rushed to the hospital. While doctors were optimistic about his recovery, Meisner spent some time in a coma, and in his weakened state, was unable to participate in the History of the Eagles tour alongside fellow ex-bandmate Bernie Leadon. Meisner later revealed that his former Eagles bandmates had paid the medical bills from the hospitalization.

In April 2015, Meisner and his wife denied rumors, based on a lawsuit filed on his behalf, that she was taking advantage of his known addictions to alcohol and drugs by trying to force-feed him bottles of vodka to keep him drunk. His self-described longtime friend, James Newton, filed papers in April asking that Meisner be placed under a court-supervised conservatorship governing his personal and financial matters. Three months later, the Los Angeles County Superior Court appointed a temporary conservator to oversee the 24-hour management of Meisner's drug prescriptions and medical state, noting that he was previously diagnosed as bipolar. Meisner had allegedly threatened to kill himself and others with a weapon in early 2015, though he did not have a firearm at the time. The brief conservatorship directed Meisner's medical care, but the judge did not give the conservator the additional power sought to also oversee his finances.

=== Death of Lana Meisner ===
On March 6, 2016, police responded to a 911 call made by a woman from the couple's house in Studio City, Los Angeles asking for police assistance with a possibly intoxicated male. Ninety minutes later, after police had left the scene, Lana Meisner was shot and killed when a rifle she was moving was struck by an object in its case and accidentally discharged. Authorities determined that Meisner had no role in the shooting, as surveillance tapes showed he was in another part of the house at the time.

After the accidental shooting, Meisner was placed under psychiatric hold after threatening suicide, due to previous threats and mental issues. On April 1, 2016, CBS News published a comprehensive assessment of Meisner's mental and caretaker issues.

=== Death ===
Meisner died due to complications associated with chronic obstructive pulmonary disease in Los Angeles, on July 26, 2023, at the age of 77.

== Discography ==
See also Poco discography, Eagles discography, and Black Tie discography for Meisner's work with these bands.

=== Albums ===
Year	Album	Peak chart positions			
Year	Album	US	US Country	AUS	CAN
1978	Randy Meisner	—	7	90	2
1980	One More Song	50	—	83	44
1982	Randy Meisner	94	15	—	12
2001	Meisner, Swan & Rich (as Meisner, Swan & Rich)	—	—	—	—
"—" denotes releases that did not chart.

=== Live ===
Year	Album
1983	Dallas

=== Compilations ===
Year	Album
2005	Love Me or Leave Me Alone

=== Singles ===
Year	Single	Peak chart positions				Album
Year	Single	US	US Rock	AUS	CAN	Album
1980	"Deep Inside My Heart" (duet with Kim Carnes)	22	—	34	12	One More Song
1981	"Hearts on Fire"	19	14	—	34	One More Song
1982	"Never Been in Love"	28	—	—	30	Randy Meisner
1992	"I'm Sure of You" (as Meisner, Swan & Rich)	—	—	—	—	N/A
"—" denotes releases that did not chart.

=== Other appearances ===
- "You" and "Into the Night" (1990) from Ballerina (Faith) soundtrack

Session work

- Bass on "Honeysuckle" and "Homesick Kid" by Compton & Batteau, on the In California album, released 1970
- Bass on "Blossom" and "Country Road" by James Taylor, on the Sweet Baby James album, released 1970

== See also ==
- List of people with bipolar disorder
