= Eagles Greatest Hits Volume 2 =

Compilation album by Eagles
- Released: 1982
- Recorded: 1975–1980
- Genre: Rock
- Length: 46:40
- Label: Asylum
- Producer: Bill Szymczyk

Eagles chronology
Eagles Live (1980)	Eagles Greatest Hits Volume 2 (1982)	The Very Best of the Eagles (1994)

Professional ratings
Review scores
Source	Rating
AllMusic	4/5 stars
Robert Christgau	B−
Rolling Stone	4/5 stars

Eagles Greatest Hits Volume 2 is the second compilation album by the Eagles. It features many of their biggest hits not on Their Greatest Hits (1971–1975), including "Hotel California", their signature song. The album was released in 1982, after the band's breakup. That same year, Don Henley and Glenn Frey both released their debut solo albums.

The compilation features eight combined tracks from Hotel California and The Long Run. Also included is "After the Thrill Is Gone", an album track from One of These Nights. (That song, with its title that summed up the state of the band at the time, was strategically placed as the last track on Eagles Greatest Hits Volume 2.) "Seven Bridges Road", the single from 1980's Eagles Live, rounds out the album, which has sold over 11 million copies in the U.S. since its release.

== Track listing ==
Side one
No.	Title	Writer(s)	Lead vocals	Length
1.	"Hotel California" (from Hotel California, 1976)	Don Henley; Glenn Frey; Don Felder	Don Henley	6:29
2.	"Heartache Tonight" (from The Long Run, 1979)	Henley; Frey; Bob Seger; JD Souther	Glenn Frey	4:25
3.	"Seven Bridges Road" (from Eagles Live, 1980)	Steve Young	Henley, Frey, Don Felder, Joe Walsh, Timothy B. Schmit	2:58
4.	"Victim of Love" (from Hotel California)	Henley; Frey; Felder; Souther	Henley	4:10
5.	"The Sad Café" (from The Long Run)	Henley; Frey; Joe Walsh; Souther	Henley	5:32

Side two
No.	Title	Writer(s)	Lead vocals	Length
1.	"Life in the Fast Lane" (from Hotel California)	Henley; Frey; Walsh	Henley	4:45
2.	"I Can't Tell You Why" (from The Long Run)	Henley; Frey; Timothy B. Schmit	Schmit	4:54
3.	"New Kid in Town" (from Hotel California)	Henley; Frey; Souther	Frey	5:04
4.	"The Long Run" (from The Long Run)	Henley; Frey	Henley	3:42
5.	"After the Thrill Is Gone" (from One of These Nights, 1975)	Henley; Frey	Frey with Henley	3:56

== Personnel ==
- Don Felder – vocals, slide guitar, guitars
- Glenn Frey – vocals, guitars, piano, keyboards
- Don Henley – vocals, drums, percussion
- Bernie Leadon – vocals, pedal steel guitar (uncredited; "After the Thrill Is Gone" only)
- Randy Meisner – vocals, bass guitar ("Hotel California", "Victim of Love", "Life in the Fast Lane", "New Kid in Town", "After the Thrill Is Gone" only)
- Timothy B. Schmit – vocals, bass guitar ("Heartache Tonight", "Seven Bridges Road", "The Sad Cafe", "I Can't Tell You Why", "The Long Run" only)
- Joe Walsh – vocals, slide guitar, guitars, keyboards (except "After the Thrill is Gone")

== Charts ==
Chart (1982)	Peak position
Australia (Kent Music Report)	5
Canada Top Albums/CDs (RPM)	63
Japanese Albums (Oricon)	44
New Zealand Albums (RMNZ)	2
US Billboard 200	52

Chart (2024)	Peak position
Hungarian Physical Albums (MAHASZ)	16

== Certifications ==
Region	Certification	Certified units/sales
Australia (ARIA)	3× Platinum	210,000^{^}
New Zealand (RMNZ)	Platinum	15,000^{^}
United States (RIAA)	11× Platinum	11,000,000^{^}
^{^} Shipments figures based on certification alone.

== See also ==
- List of best-selling albums in the United States
