= The Very Best of the Eagles =

Greatest hits album by Eagles
- Released: July 11, 1994
- Recorded: 1972–1979
- Genre: Rock
- Length: 75:40
- Label: Elektra
- Producers: Glyn Johns, Bill Szymczyk

Eagles chronology
| Eagles Greatest Hits Volume 2 (1982) | The Very Best of the Eagles (1994) | Hell Freezes Over (1994) |

Professional ratings
Review scores
| Source | Rating |
|---|---|
| Music Week | 4/5 stars |

The Very Best of the Eagles is the fifth compilation album by the Eagles. It was originally released in Europe, Australia and New Zealand on July 11, 1994, by Elektra Records.

Europe and New Zealand received a standard release whereas in Australia it was also available as a numbered, limited edition Australian tour version that was pressed on a Gold CD.

The album was remastered and reissued in May 2001 with all the same songs that were on the original release but in a different sequence.

The compilation album was not released in the United States, although it was successful in other parts of the world, appearing in the top 10 of the albums charts in nine countries and becoming certified gold in seven countries and platinum in three.

== Compilation and artwork ==
The Very Best of the Eagles is composed of seventeen songs, fifteen of which were released as singles and two songs—"Desperado" and "Doolin-Dalton"—that were album tracks from Desperado. The 2001 reissue's track listing is more loosely compiled.

Both issues of the album feature desert-themed photography. The first release featured art direction and design by Gabrielle Raumberger. The reissue had its art direction handled by Jeri Heiden with design by Barrie Goshko, who also did photo manipulation for the release.

Both the original and the reissue erroneously credit Glyn Johns as producer on the track "James Dean" from the On the Border album. It was produced by Bill Szymczyk.

== Track listing ==
=== Original release ===
| No. | Title | Writer(s) | Original album | Length |
|---|---|---|---|---|
| 1. | "Take It Easy" | Jackson Browne, Glenn Frey | Eagles, 1972 | 3:32 |
| 2. | "Witchy Woman" | Don Henley, Bernie Leadon | Eagles | 4:15 |
| 3. | "Peaceful Easy Feeling" | Jack Tempchin | Eagles | 4:21 |
| 4. | "Doolin-Dalton" | Browne, Frey, Henley, JD Souther | Desperado, 1973 | 3:30 |
| 5. | "Desperado" | Frey, Henley | Desperado | 3:35 |
| 6. | "Tequila Sunrise" | Frey, Henley | Desperado | 2:55 |
| 7. | "Best of My Love" | Frey, Henley, Souther | On the Border, 1974 | 4:36 |
| 8. | "James Dean" | Browne, Frey, Henley, Souther | On the Border | 3:40 |
| 9. | "I Can't Tell You Why" | Frey, Henley, Timothy B. Schmit | The Long Run, 1979 | 4:56 |
| 10. | "Lyin' Eyes" | Frey, Henley | One of These Nights, 1975 | 6:24 |
| 11. | "Take It to the Limit" | Frey, Henley, Randy Meisner | One of These Nights | 4:49 |
| 12. | "One of These Nights" | Frey, Henley | One of These Nights | 4:53 |
| 13. | "Hotel California" | Don Felder, Frey, Henley | Hotel California, 1976 | 6:31 |
| 14. | "New Kid in Town" | Frey, Henley, Souther | Hotel California | 5:04 |
| 15. | "Life in the Fast Lane" | Frey, Henley, Joe Walsh | Hotel California | 4:47 |
| 16. | "Heartache Tonight" | Frey, Henley, Bob Seger, Souther | The Long Run | 4:27 |
| 17. | "The Long Run" | Frey, Henley | The Long Run | 3:42 |

=== 2001 reissue ===
| No. | Title | Writer(s) | Original album | Length |
|---|---|---|---|---|
| 1. | "One of These Nights" | Frey, Henley | One of These Nights | 4:53 |
| 2. | "Take It Easy" | Browne, Frey | Eagles | 3:32 |
| 3. | "Hotel California" | Felder, Frey, Henley | Hotel California | 6:31 |
| 4. | "New Kid in Town" | Frey, Henley, Souther | Hotel California | 5:04 |
| 5. | "Heartache Tonight" | Frey, Henley, Seger, Souther | The Long Run | 4:27 |
| 6. | "Tequila Sunrise" | Frey, Henley | Desperado | 2:55 |
| 7. | "Desperado" | Frey, Henley | Desperado | 3:35 |
| 8. | "Best of My Love" | Frey, Henley, Souther | On the Border | 4:36 |
| 9. | "Lyin' Eyes" | Frey, Henley | One of These Nights | 6:24 |
| 10. | "Take It to the Limit" | Frey, Henley, Meisner | One of These Nights | 4:49 |
| 11. | "I Can't Tell You Why" | Frey, Henley, Schmit | The Long Run | 4:56 |
| 12. | "Peaceful Easy Feeling" | Tempchin | Eagles | 4:21 |
| 13. | "James Dean" | Browne, Frey, Henley, Souther | On the Border | 3:40 |
| 14. | "Doolin-Dalton" | Browne, Frey, Henley, Souther | Desperado | 3:30 |
| 15. | "Witchy Woman" | Henley, Leadon | Eagles | 4:15 |
| 16. | "The Long Run" | Frey, Henley | The Long Run | 3:42 |
| 17. | "Life in the Fast Lane" | Frey, Henley, Walsh | Hotel California | 4:47 |

== Personnel ==
- Glenn Frey – guitars, keyboards, vocals
- Don Henley – drums, percussion, guitars, vocals
- Bernie Leadon – guitars, banjo, vocals
- Randy Meisner – bass, vocals
- Don Felder – guitars, vocals
- Joe Walsh – guitars, keyboards, vocals
- Timothy B. Schmit – bass, vocals

Production

- Glyn Johns – producer, engineer
- Jim Ed Norman – string arrangements, piano
- Bill Szymczyk – producer, engineer

== Charts ==
=== Album charts ===
| Chart (1994) | Peak position |
|---|---|
| Australian Top 50 Albums | 2 |
| Canadian Top Albums | 28 |
| New Zealand Top 50 Albums | 3 |
| Swiss Top 100 Albums | 9 |
| UK Albums Chart | 4 |

| Chart (1995) | Peak position |
|---|---|
| Belgium (Wallonia) 100 Albums | 28 |

| Chart (1996) | Peak position |
|---|---|
| Swedish Top 60 Albums | 7 |

| Chart (1999) | Peak position |
|---|---|
| French Compilations | 15 |

| Chart (2001) | Peak position |
|---|---|
| Belgium (Flanders) 100 Albums | 12 |
| Danish Top 40 Albums | 10 |
| Finnish Top 50 Albums | 4 |
| German Albums | 20 |
| Italian Top 20 Albums | 18 |
| Netherlands Top 100 Albums | 9 |
| Norwegian Top 40 Albums | 4 |
| UK Albums Chart | 3 |

== Certifications and sales ==
| Region | Certification | Certified units/sales |
|---|---|---|
| Argentina (CAPIF) | Platinum | 40,000^{^} |
| Australia (ARIA) | 9× Platinum | 850,000 |
| Finland (Musiikkituottajat) | Gold | 23,307 |
| France (SNEP) | 2× Gold | 200,000^{*} |
| Germany (BVMI) | Gold | 250,000^{^} |
| Japan (RIAJ) | Platinum | 200,000^{^} |
| Netherlands (NVPI) | Platinum | 100,000^{^} |
| New Zealand (RMNZ) | 8× Platinum | 120,000^{^} |
| Spain (Promusicae) | Gold | 50,000^{^} |
| Sweden (GLF) | Gold | 50,000^{^} |
| Switzerland (IFPI Switzerland) | Gold | 25,000^{^} |
| United Kingdom (BPI) | 2× Platinum | 600,000^{^} |
^{*} Sales figures based on certification alone.^{^} Shipments figures based on certification alone.
