= Hell Freezes Over =

- 1994 CD edition

Live album (with studio tracks) by the Eagles
- Released: November 8, 1994
- Recorded: April 25–26, 1994
- Venue: Warner Bros. Studio (Burbank, California)
- Studios: The Village Recorder (Los Angeles California); Sounds Interchange (Toronto): The Hit Factory (New York City)
- Genre: Rock
- Length: 72:36
- Labels: Geffen; Eagles Recording Company
- Producers: Eagles; Elliot Scheiner; Rob Jacobs; Stan Lynch

Eagles chronology
The Very Best of the Eagles (1994)	Hell Freezes Over (1994)	Selected Works: 1972–1999 (2000)

Singles from Hell Freezes Over
- 1. "Get Over It" Released: October 18, 1994; 2. "Love Will Keep Us Alive" Released: November 1994; 3. "The Girl from Yesterday" Released: 1994; 4. "Learn to Be Still" Released: 1995; 5. "Hotel California (live)" Released: 1995

Professional ratings
Review scores
Source	Rating
AllMusic	3/5 stars
Rolling Stone	2/5 stars

Hell Freezes Over is the second live album by the American rock band the Eagles, released on November 8, 1994, by Geffen Records. The album is the first to be released after the Eagles had reformed following a 14-year break up. The band's lineup was that of the Long Run era: Glenn Frey, Don Henley, Don Felder, Joe Walsh and Timothy B. Schmit. It contains four new studio tracks and eleven tracks recorded live in April 1994 for an MTV special. Two Top 40 Mainstream singles, "Get Over It" and "Love Will Keep Us Alive", were released from the album. It also features an acoustic version of "Hotel California". The four new studio recordings are the last to feature Don Felder, who was fired from the band in 2001.

The album went to No. 1 on the Billboard album chart upon its release where it stayed for two weeks. The album has sold over 9 million copies in the United States.

Hell Freezes Over was also released in video form on VHS, LaserDisc and DVD. Before the album was released, the Eagles also started a tour, which would last from 1994 to 1996 and became one of the most successful tours in music history.

== Background ==
The album name is in reference to a quote by Don Henley after the band's breakup in 1980. Henley was asked in an interview about when the band would play together again, to which he responded "when Hell freezes over". Glenn Frey also said in 1982 on the breakup: "I just rule out the possibility of putting the Eagles back together for a Lost Youth and Greed tour."

In 1993, an Eagles tribute album, Common Thread: The Songs of the Eagles, was recorded by several country artists. Travis Tritt, who covered "Take It Easy" in the album, asked the band to appear in his video for the song. The band members agreed, and it would be the first time the group had appeared together in 13 years. Two months later, Frey and Henley had lunch with their management and decided to reunite.

The band members performed live for the first time in April 1994 at Warner Bros. Studios in Burbank, California for an MTV special. The recording sessions produced 11 tracks for the Hell Freezes Over album, including a new arrangement of "Hotel California" that featured an extended acoustic guitar and percussion opening. At the beginning of the concert, Frey joked to the audience: "For the record, we never broke up; we just took a 14-year vacation". The tour began on May 27, and the Hell Freezes Over album was released on November 8, 1994. The album is the band's second live album, after 1980's Eagles Live.

A new song "Get Over It" became a modest hit and another new song, "Love Will Keep Us Alive", reached No. 1 on the Billboard Adult Contemporary chart.

The DVD is one of the first music releases to feature a DTS format soundtrack in addition to a PCM stereo soundtrack. The DVD also featured the song "Seven Bridges Road" in DTS audio only. The DVD has since been re-released with an additional Dolby Digital soundtrack. The album was also released as a DTS CD in 1997.

== Track listing ==
Original CD edition
No.	Title	Writer(s)	Lead vocals	Length
1.	"Get Over It" (New song)	Don Henley, Glenn Frey	Henley	3:31
2.	"Love Will Keep Us Alive" (New song)	Pete Vale, Jim Capaldi, Paul Carrack	Schmit	4:03
3.	"The Girl from Yesterday" (New song)	Frey, Jack Tempchin	Frey	3:23
4.	"Learn to Be Still" (New song)	Henley, Stan Lynch	Henley	4:28
5.	"Tequila Sunrise" (Originally from Desperado, 1973)	Henley, Frey	Frey	3:28
6.	"Hotel California" (Originally from Hotel California, 1976)	Don Felder, Henley, Frey	Henley	7:12
7.	"Wasted Time" (Originally from Hotel California)	Henley, Frey	Henley	5:19
8.	"Pretty Maids All in a Row" (Originally from Hotel California)	Joe Walsh, Joe Vitale	Walsh	4:26
9.	"I Can't Tell You Why" (Originally from The Long Run, 1979)	Henley, Frey, Timothy B. Schmit	Schmit	5:11
10.	"New York Minute" (Originally from Don Henley's The End of the Innocence, 1989)	Henley, Danny Kortchmar, Jai Winding	Henley	6:37
11.	"The Last Resort" (Originally from Hotel California)	Henley, Frey	Henley	7:24
12.	"Take It Easy" (Originally from Eagles, 1972)	Jackson Browne, Frey	Frey	4:36
13.	"In the City" (Originally from The Long Run)	Walsh, Barry De Vorzon	Walsh	4:07
14.	"Life in the Fast Lane" (Originally from Hotel California)	Henley, Frey, Walsh	Henley	6:01
15.	"Desperado" (Originally from Desperado)	Henley, Frey	Henley	4:17

DVD-only tracks
No.	Title	Writer(s)	Lead vocals	Length
1.	"Help Me Through the Night" (Originally from Joe Walsh's So What, 1974)	Walsh	Walsh	3:49
2.	"The Heart of the Matter" (Originally from Don Henley's The End of the Innocence)	Henley, Mike Campbell, JD Souther	Henley	5:41
3.	"Seven Bridges Road" (Remixed recording from Eagles Live, 1980)	Steve Young	Felder, Frey, Henley, Schmit, Walsh	3:14

- All new songs were released as studio recordings on the album, but can be seen live on the VHS and DVD versions.
- "Seven Bridges Road" – DTS – A remastered version of the recording featured on Eagles Live, with a clearer separation of the five vocal parts to exploit the full potential of a 5.1 speaker set-up: Timothy B. Schmit is on the rear-right, Glenn Frey as the singer of the song's main melody on the front-right, Don Henley on the front-left and Joe Walsh on the rear-left. Don Felder is on the front-center channel.

== Personnel ==
Compiled from Hell Freezes Over liner notes.

Eagles

- Don Henley – vocals, drums, acoustic rhythm guitar, percussion
- Timothy B. Schmit – vocals, bass guitar
- Glenn Frey – vocals, electric and acoustic guitars, piano, keyboards
- Don Felder – harmony and backing vocals, electric guitar, acoustic guitar, pedal steel guitar, mandolin
- Joe Walsh – vocals, electric and acoustic guitars, slide guitar, organ

Additional personnel

- John Corey – harmony and backing vocals, piano, guitar
- Scott Crago – percussion, drums
- Timothy Drury – harmony and backing vocals, keyboards
- Stan Lynch – percussion
- Jay Oliver – organ, keyboards, piano
- Paulinho Da Costa – percussion
- Gary Grimm – percussion
- Brian Matthews – Electro-Theremin
- Al Garth – trumpet on "New York Minute"
- Burbank Philharmonic Orchestra – backup on tracks 7–11, 15 (CD); tracks 7–12, 17 (DVD)
- Will Hollis – keyboards, synthesizers 2–4 (CD)

Production

- Eagles – production (all tracks)
- Elliot Scheiner – production (all tracks except "Learn to Be Still")
- Rob Jacobs – production (all tracks)
- Stan Lynch – production ("Learn to Be Still" only)
- Joel Stillerman – executive producer
- Carol Donovan – program producer
- Beth McCarthy – program director
- Marie NeJame - assistant program director
- Audrey Johns – program line producer
- Rob Jacobs, Elliot Scheiner – engineers
- Charlie Bouis, Carl Glanville, Barry Goldberg, Andy Grassi, Tom Trafalski, Ken Villeneuve, Tom Winslow – second engineers
- Todd Bowie and Chris Buttleman – guitar technicians
- Ted Jensen – mastering, editing
- Rob Jacobs, Dave Kob, Dave Reynolds, Elliot Scheiner – mixing
- Adam Armstrong – vocal technician
- Don Davis, The Eagles, Jay Oliver – horn and string arrangements
- David Hewitt – live recording coordinator
- John Halpern, David Skernick – photography
- Keith Raywood – production design
- Robin Sloane, Janet Wolsborn – art direction
- Dwaine "The Peachin' Trucker" Wise – road manager
- Andrew Lopez – head driver

== Charts ==
=== Weekly charts ===
Chart (1994–1997)	Peak position
Australian Albums (ARIA)	23
Austrian Albums (Ö3 Austria)	24
Canada Top Albums/CDs (RPM)	1
Dutch Albums (Album Top 100)	10
German Albums (Offizielle Top 100)	16
Japanese Albums (Oricon)	6
New Zealand Albums (RMNZ)	3
Norwegian Albums (VG-lista)	13
Scottish Albums (Official Charts)	12
Swedish Albums (Sverigetopplistan)	9
Swiss Albums (Schweizer Hitparade)	26
UK Albums (Official Charts)	18
US Billboard 200	1

Chart (2001)	Peak position
Finnish Albums (Suomen virallinen lista)	16

Chart (2019)	Peak position
German Albums (Offizielle Top 100)	26

=== Year-end charts ===
Chart (1994)	Peak position
Australian Albums (ARIA)	87
Canada Top Albums/CDs (RPM)	41
Chart (1995)	Peak position
Canada Top Albums/CDs (RPM)	14
US Billboard 200	4

=== Decade-end charts ===
Chart (1990–1999)	Peak position
US Billboard 200	37

=== Video/DVD ===
Chart (2002)	Peak position
Japanese DVDs Chart	151

Chart (2003)	Peak position
Netherlands Top 30 Music DVDs	3
Swedish Top 20 DVDs	1

Chart (2004)	Peak position
New Zealand Top 10 Music DVDs	1
Norwegian Top 10 DVDs	1
Portuguese Top 30 Music DVDs	3

== Certifications ==
=== Album ===
Region	Certification	Certified units/sales
Australia (ARIA)	Platinum	70,000^{^}
Canada (Music Canada)	7× Platinum	700,000^{^}
Germany (BVMI)	Gold	250,000^{‡}
Japan (RIAJ)	Platinum	286,000
Netherlands (NVPI)	Gold	50,000^{^}
New Zealand (RMNZ)	4× Platinum	60,000^{^}
Norway (IFPI Norway)	Platinum	50,000^{*}
Spain (Promusicae)	Gold	50,000^{^}
Sweden (GLF)	Gold	50,000^{^}
United Kingdom (BPI)	Platinum	300,000^{^}
United States (RIAA)	9× Platinum	9,000,000
^{*} Sales figures based on certification alone.^{^} Shipments figures based on certification alone.^{‡} Sales+streaming figures based on certification alone.

=== Video/DVD ===
Region	Certification	Certified units/sales
Argentina (CAPIF)	Platinum	8,000^{^}
Australia (ARIA)	20× Platinum	300,000^{^}
Canada (Music Canada)	Platinum	10,000^{^}
Denmark (IFPI Danmark)	2× Platinum	80,000^{^}
Sweden (GLF)	Gold	10,000^{^}
United Kingdom (BPI)	3× Platinum	150,000^{^}
United States (RIAA)	8× Platinum	800,000^{^}
^{^} Shipments figures based on certification alone.
