= Eagles Live =

Live album by Eagles
- Released: November 7, 1980
- Recorded: October 20, 1976 – July 31, 1980
- Venues: The Forum (Inglewood, California); Santa Monica Civic Auditorium (Santa Monica, California); Long Beach Arena (Long Beach, California)
- Genre: Rock
- Length: 77:10
- Label: Asylum
- Producer: Bill Szymczyk

Eagles chronology
The Long Run (1979)	Eagles Live (1980)	Eagles Greatest Hits Volume 2 (1982)

Singles from Eagles Live
- 1. "Seven Bridges Road" Released: December 15, 1980

Professional ratings
Review scores
Source	Rating
Allmusic	3/5 stars
Robert Christgau	C−

Eagles Live is the first live album by the American rock band the Eagles, a two-LP set released on November 7, 1980. Although the Eagles were already in the process of breaking up, the band owed Elektra/Asylum Records one more album and fulfilled that contractual obligation with a release of performances from the Hotel California and The Long Run tours.

Eagles Live was mixed by Glenn Frey and Don Henley on opposite coasts in Los Angeles and Miami, respectively, and as producer Bill Szymczyk put it, the record's harmony and instrument fixes were made "courtesy of Federal Express." The 1983 Rolling Stone Record Guide said it is "perhaps the most heavily overdubbed [live album] in history." "Seven Bridges Road," a Steve Young cover, was released as a single and became a top-40 hit.

== Recording ==
Five of the tracks were recorded in October 1976, during three performances at The Forum in Inglewood, California. The other ten tracks were recorded in July 1980, from three shows at the Santa Monica Civic Auditorium and one at the Long Beach Arena in California. The band had different line-ups in 1976 and 1980; Timothy B. Schmit joined in 1978, replacing original bassist Randy Meisner. Five lead singers are featured in the 14 vocal songs on the album [excluding the brief musical interlude of "Doolin Dalton (Reprise II)"]: Henley, Frey, Joe Walsh, Meisner and Schmit. Songs from each Eagles studio album except one (On the Border) are included, as well as two Walsh solo tracks and one cover song: the acoustic harmony-laden "Seven Bridges Road."

Plagued for years by internal strife, the band had reached a breaking point by July 31, 1980, when The Long Run tour concluded with a concert in Long Beach, California, that served as a fund-raiser for then-Senator Alan Cranston's campaign. The version of "All Night Long" for Eagles Live was recorded at this show, which was most notable for a dispute between bandmates Frey and Don Felder that culminated backstage, when they nearly came to blows. Frey then refused to even speak to the other band members, let alone join them to record overdubs for Eagles Live; therefore, the recording was done piecemeal. Frey was in Los Angeles while the rest of the band was in Miami, with Henley overseeing the post-production sessions. Tapes were sent back and forth between the two locations until the album was completed. Szymczyk said: "I had my assistant in Los Angeles with Glenn, and I had the rest of the band fly to Miami. We were fixing three-part harmonies courtesy of Federal Express." Five different lawyers were thanked in the liner notes.

The Eagles rejected a $2 million offer from the label to record two new songs for the album. The only previously unreleased song in the album is a version of "Seven Bridges Road". The song was a showcase for the band's close harmony singing, as the verses of the song feature a cappella vocals from all five members.

== Cover ==
The album cover is the image of a band-equipment road case used during a concert tour. It includes the number 86 on both sides and "MIA" written on air-freight stickers on the back.

The record labels were custom, showing a bird's nest filled with eggs and hand grenades.

Original pressings of the vinyl double-album had text engraved in the run-out grooves on each side, as had been the band's tradition since their 1975 album One of These Nights. Side 1: "Is it illegal to yell "Movie!" in a firehouse?"; "Side 2: "Hello, Federal? ... Ship it!"; Side 3: "Not Tonight, thanks ..."; Side 4: "... I've gotta rest up for my monster".

== Track listing ==
Side one
No.	Title	Writer(s)	Lead vocals	Length
1.	"Hotel California" (July 29, 1980, Santa Monica)	Don Felder; Don Henley; Glenn Frey	Don Henley	6:55
2.	"Heartache Tonight" (July 27, 1980, Santa Monica)	Henley; Frey; Bob Seger; JD Souther	Glenn Frey	4:35
3.	"I Can't Tell You Why" (July 28, 1980, Santa Monica)	Henley; Frey; Timothy B. Schmit	Timothy B. Schmit	5:24

Side two
No.	Title	Writer(s)	Lead vocals	Length
1.	"The Long Run" (July 27, 1980, Santa Monica)	Henley; Frey	Henley	5:35
2.	"New Kid in Town" (October 22, 1976, The Forum)	Henley; Frey; Souther	Frey	5:45
3.	"Life's Been Good" (July 29, 1980, Santa Monica)	Joe Walsh	Joe Walsh	9:38

Side three
No.	Title	Writer(s)	Lead vocals	Length
1.	"Seven Bridges Road" (July 28, 1980, Santa Monica)	Steve Young	Henley, Frey, Walsh, Schmit, Don Felder	3:54
2.	"Wasted Time" (October 22, 1976, The Forum)	Henley; Frey	Henley	5:40
3.	"Take It to the Limit" (October 20, 1976, The Forum)	Henley; Frey; Randy Meisner	Randy Meisner	5:20
4.	"Doolin-Dalton (Reprise II)" (October 21, 1976, The Forum)	Henley; Frey; Jim Ed Norman	instrumental	0:44
5.	"Desperado" (October 21, 1976, The Forum)	Henley; Frey	Henley	4:04

Side four
No.	Title	Writer(s)	Lead vocals	Length
1.	"Saturday Night" (July 28, 1980, Santa Monica)	Henley; Frey; Meisner; Bernie Leadon	Henley	3:55
2.	"All Night Long" (July 31, 1980, Long Beach)	Walsh	Walsh	5:40
3.	"Life in the Fast Lane" (July 27, 1980, Santa Monica)	Henley; Frey; Walsh	Henley	5:10
4.	"Take It Easy" (July 27, 1980, Santa Monica)	Frey; Jackson Browne	Frey	5:20

== Personnel ==
Sourced from original album liner notes.

Eagles

- Don Felder – guitars, slide guitar, organ, harmony and backing vocals
- Glenn Frey – rhythm guitar, keyboards, vocals
- Don Henley – drums, percussion, vocals
- Randy Meisner – bass guitar, vocals (1976 shows; "New Kid in Town," "Wasted Time," "Take It to the Limit," "Doolin'-Dalton (Reprise II)," and "Desperado")
- Timothy B. Schmit – bass guitar, vocals (1980 shows; all other songs)
- Joe Walsh – guitars, slide guitar, keyboards, vocals

Additional musicians

- Jage Jackson – rhythm guitar, percussion
- Albhy Galuten – synthesizer
- Phil Kenzie – alto saxophone on "The Long Run"
- Vince Melamed – electric piano on "New Kid in Town"
- Jim Ed Norman – piano
- The Monstertones – backing vocals on "All Night Long"
- David Sanborn – alto saxophone
- JD Souther – vocals and acoustic guitar on "New Kid in Town"
- Joe Vitale – piano, organ, drums, percussion

Production

- Bill Szymczyk – production
- Ted Jensen – mastering engineer

== Charts ==
=== Weekly charts ===
Chart (1980–1981)	Peak position
Australian Albums (Kent Music Report)	3
Canada Top Albums/CDs (RPM)	25
Dutch Albums (Album Top 100)	7
German Albums (Offizielle Top 100)	55
Japanese Albums (Oricon)	8
New Zealand Albums (RMNZ)	9
Norwegian Albums (VG-lista)	25
Swedish Albums (Sverigetopplistan)	44
UK Albums (Official Charts)	24
US Billboard 200	6

=== Year-end charts ===
Chart (1980)	Peak position
Australian Albums (Kent Music Report)	67

Chart (1981)	Peak position
Australian Albums (Kent Music Report)	60
US Billboard 200	67

== Certifications ==
Region	Certification	Certified units/sales
Canada (Music Canada)	Gold	50,000^{^}
France (SNEP)	Gold	100,000^{*}
Hong Kong (IFPI Hong Kong)	Gold	10,000^{*}
Japan (RIAJ)	Gold	100,000^{^}
United Kingdom (BPI)	Gold	100,000^{^}
United States (RIAA)	7× Platinum	3,500,000^{^}
^{*} Sales figures based on certification alone.^{^} Shipments figures based on certification alone.
