= The Last Resort (Eagles song) =

Song by the Eagles released in 1977

Single by Eagles

from the album Hotel California
- A-side: "Life in the Fast Lane"
- Released: May 3, 1977
- Recorded: March–October 1976
- Genre: Soft rock
- Length: 7:28
- Label: Asylum
- Songwriters: Glenn Frey, Don Henley
- Producer: Bill Szymczyk

"The Last Resort" is a song written by Don Henley and Glenn Frey, which describes industry and commerce inevitably destroying beautiful places. It was originally released on the Eagles' album Hotel California on December 8, 1976. It was subsequently released as the B-side of "Life in the Fast Lane" single on May 3, 1977.

In a 1978 interview with Rolling Stone, Henley said: "'The Last Resort', on Hotel California, is still one of my favorite songs... That's because I care more about the environment than about writing songs about drugs or love affairs or excesses of any kind. The gist of the song was that when we find something good, we destroy it by our presence — by the very fact that man is the only animal on earth that is capable of destroying his environment. The environment is the reason I got into politics: to try to do something about what I saw as the complete destruction of most of the resources that we have left. We have mortgaged our future for gain and greed."

== Composition ==
On an episode of In the Studio with Redbeard (which devoted an entire episode to the making of Hotel California), Frey stated:

I have to give all the credit for 'The Last Resort' to (Don) Henley. It was the first time that Don, on his own, took it upon himself to write an epic story. We were very much at that time, concerned about the environment and doing anti-nuclear benefit (concerts). It seemed the perfect way to wrap up all of the different topics we had explored on the Hotel California album. Don found himself as a lyricist with that song, kind of outdid himself...We're constantly screwing up paradise and that was the point of the song and that at some point there is going to be no more new frontiers. I mean we're putting junk, er, garbage into space now. There's enough crap floating around the planet that we can't even use so it just seems to be our way. It's unfortunate but that is sort of what happens.

Frey referred to the song as "Henley's opus."

Henley recalled that he had been reading about "the raping and pillaging of the West by mining, timber, oil and cattle interests" at the time he wrote the song. He said that he wanted to expand the song's scope even further, and so he "tried to go 'Michener' with it," but was never totally satisfied with how it came out.

== Recording ==
The band recorded "The Last Resort" at the Criteria Studios in Miami, Florida. However, Black Sabbath was also recording Technical Ecstasy in an adjacent studio and played loudly. The Eagles had to re-record the song a number of times due to the noise coming through the wall.

== Critical reception ==
Music critic Dave Thompson considers it an update of Joni Mitchell's "Big Yellow Taxi" but says that it is "even more weary and despairing." Thompson regards the line "Some rich men came and raped the land. Nobody caught ‘em" to be a critique of a free market economy. Critic William Ruhlmann said of it that it "sketches a broad, pessimistic history of America that borders on nihilism." Author James Perone says that it ties "all the previous songs [from Hotel California] together in this final reflection of the dark side of California Life." He notes, for example, how the song lyrics contrast the beauty of the California desert with ugly suburban houses and ultimately progresses to criticize the concept of manifest destiny, on which American expansion to California was partially based. He regards the key lyric to be the line "They called it paradise; I don't know why," noting the emphasis given to it by the resignation of Henley's voice and by the falling melody. Perone does criticize the use of synthesizer on the song instead of actual string instruments, which he feels sounds artificial. To Eagles' biographer Marc Eliot, "The Last Resort" tells "the story of a nation's self-destruction and physical decay told as metaphor for personal creative burnout." In 2016, the editors of Rolling Stone rated "The Last Resort" as the Eagles #27 greatest song. Ultimate Classic Rock critic Sterling Whitaker rated it as the Eagles most underrated song, calling it "an epic track that presented the entire world as a resort being destroyed by the greedy, self-serving and short-sighted machinations of the human race" with "an alluring pop arrangement." Ultimate Classic Rock critic Nick DeRiso rated it the Eagles' 3rd best album closing song, stating that "an album defined by empty dissolution ends the only way it could: with a lonesome figure, surrounded by wreckage of his own making."

== Personnel ==
- Don Henley - lead vocals, drums, synthesizer
- Glenn Frey - piano, acoustic guitar, backing vocals
- Joe Walsh - electric guitar, synthesizer, backing vocals
- Don Felder - pedal steel guitar, electric guitar, backing vocals
- Randy Meisner - bass, backing vocals

== Live performances ==
"The Last Resort" was played live at the Hell Freezes Over concerts in 1994. As of November 6, 2021, Eagles has performed this song 88 times, including 41 times in 2022 and 23 times in 2021. Don Henley has performed "The Last Resort" live at 59 solo concerts, most of which were in 2016 and 2017.
