= Steven Gey =

American legal academic (1956–2011)

- Born: April 6, 1956; Pensacola, Florida, U.S.
- Died: June 9, 2011 (aged 55); Tallahassee, Florida, U.S.

Academic background
- Education: Eckerd College (BA); Columbia University (JD)

Academic work
- Discipline: Law
- Sub-discipline: Constitutional interpretation Freedom of speech Freedom of religion
- Institutions: Florida State University

Steven G. Gey (April 6, 1956 – June 9, 2011) was an American legal academic and one of the leading U.S. scholars on religious liberties and free speech.

== Early life and education ==
Gey was born and raised in Pensacola, Florida. He earned a Bachelor of Arts degree in philosophy from Eckerd College in 1978 and a Juris Doctor from Columbia Law School in 1982. As a law student, he worked as the articles editor of the Columbia Law Review.

== Career ==
Before joining the faculty at the Florida State University College of Law, Gey practiced law for two years at Paul, Weiss, Rifkind, Wharton & Garrison in New York City, where he did extensive pro bono work, often on behalf of those facing the death penalty.

Gey worked as the David and Deborah Fonvielle and Donald and Janet Hinkle Professor at Florida State University. In April 1990, he delivered a short speech at commencement that explores the quote from Dick the Butcher in Henry VI, Part 2 to "kill all the lawyers". Gey explores the important role of lawyers in the functioning of a civil society, and protecting the rights of the marginalized.

His scholarship includes Cases and Materials on Religion and the State and dozens of articles on religious liberties, free speech, and constitutional interpretation. Gey was an active participant in national debates regarding the teaching of evolution in public schools and he served as a regular commentator on legal issues for ABC News in the aftermath of the 2000 United States presidential election and Bush v. Gore.

In 2007, he received the "Friend of Darwin Award" from the National Center for Science Education. A permanent law fellowship position with Americans United for Separation of Church and State is named in honor of Gey, in appreciation of his efforts regarding religious freedoms.

== Personal life ==
In 2006, Gey was diagnosed with Amyotrophic lateral sclerosis (ALS). He died June 9, 2011.
