= Get Over It (Eagles song) =

1994 single by Eagles

Single by Eagles

from the album Hell Freezes Over
- B-side: "Get Over It" (live)
- Released: October 18, 1994
- Genre: Rock
- Length: 3:30
- Label: Geffen; The Eagles Recording Company
- Songwriters: Don Henley; Glenn Frey
- Producers: Eagles; Elliot Scheiner; Rob Jacobs

Eagles singles chronology
"Seven Bridges Road" (1980)	"Get Over It" (1994)	"Love Will Keep Us Alive" (1994)

"Get Over It" is a song by American rock band Eagles, released as a single in 1994 after a 14-year breakup. It was also the first song written by bandmates Don Henley and Glenn Frey when the band reunited. "Get Over It" was played live for the first time during their Hell Freezes Over tour in 1994. It returned the band to the US top 40 after a fourteen-year absence, peaking at No. 31 and 35 on the Billboard Hot 100 and Cash Box Top 100. It also hit No. 4 on the Billboard Mainstream Rock Tracks chart. The song was not played live by the Eagles after the Hell Freezes Over tour. It remains the group's last top-40 hit in the US.

== Theme ==
The song is about Henley's frustration and contempt for others (such as TV talk show guests) blaming their failures, mental breakdowns, and financial problems on those who he feels do not deserve it, then believing that the world owes them a favor. The song's lyrics include "Old Billy was right: let's kill all the lawyers—kill 'em tonight", which references William Shakespeare's Henry VI, Part II line "The first thing we do, let's kill all the lawyers".

== Personnel ==
- Don Henley: lead vocals, drums
- Glenn Frey: lead and rhythm guitar, backing vocals
- Don Felder: lead and rhythm guitar
- Joe Walsh: slide guitar, rhythm guitar
- Timothy B. Schmit: bass guitar, backing vocals
- Scott F. Crago: drums (overdub)

== Charts ==
=== Weekly charts ===
Chart (1994–1995)	Peak position
Australia (ARIA)	74
Canada Top Singles (RPM)	4
Canada Adult Contemporary (RPM)	13
Europe (European Hit Radio)	13
Germany (GfK)	55
Iceland (Íslenski Listinn Topp 40)	33
US Billboard Hot 100	31
US Adult Contemporary (Billboard)	21
US Mainstream Rock Airplay (Billboard)	4
US Pop Airplay (Billboard)	26
US Cash Box Top 100	35

=== Year-end charts ===
Chart (1994)	Position
Canada Top Singles (RPM)	63
