= Wasted Time (Eagles song) =

1976 song by the Eagles

Song by Eagles

from the album Hotel California
- Released: December 8, 1976
- Recorded: 1976
- Genre: Rock
- Length: 4:55
- Label: Asylum
- Songwriters: Don Henley, Glenn Frey
- Producer: Bill Szymczyk

"Wasted Time" is a song written by Don Henley and Glenn Frey that was first released on the Eagles' 1977 album Hotel California. It was subsequently released on several live and compilation albums.

== Lyrics and music ==
The subject of "Wasted Time" is a love affair that has ended. The woman at least has been through some similar breakups and is concerned about the dreams of her youth slipping away. Both partners are concerned that the affair had been a waste of time but in the final verse the singer sings that eventually they will realize that it hadn't been wasted time after all. It is not clear whether the singer really believes that or whether he just can't bear to think that the relationship really was just wasted time.

The song was inspired by Henley's breaking up with one of his girlfriends, Loree Rodkin. Eagles biographer Marc Eliot described the song as "Henley's reaction to the end of their affair, a visceral elegy for this sad morning after and a metaphorical description of the moral price of fleeting romance." Henley said "Nothing inspires or catalyzes a great balad like a failed relationship. It's a very empathetic song." Music professor James E. Perone felt that the theme of "Wasted Time" was more generic than that of most of the songs on Hotel California and was not specific to "the social scene that is explored throughout most of the album."

Musically, "Wasted Time" is a slow ballad. The music of "Wasted Time" was inspired by the Philadelphia soul sound of Teddy Pendergrass in particular. According to Frey:

I loved all the records coming out of Philadelphia at that time. I sent for some sheet music so I could learn some of those songs, and I started creating my own musical ideas with that Philly influence. Don was our Teddy Pendergrass. He could stand out there all alone and just wail. We did a big Philly-type production with strings — definitely not country-rock.

The Spinners were another influence on the music of the song. It also has similarities to early Eagles' songs such as "Desperado". The primary instruments are piano and a string instruments, with light support provided by the drums, bass and guitars. Jim Ed Norman provided the string arrangements. Henley sang the lead vocal.

== Reception ==
The editors of Rolling Stone rated "Wasted Time" to be the Eagles' 25th best song, particularly praising how Henley "deeply channels the pathos of the lyrics." Ultimate Classic Rock critic Nick DeRiso rated "Wasted Time" to be the Eagles' 23rd best song. Fellow Ultimate Classic Rock critic Sterling Whitaker rated "Wasted Time" as the Eagles' 9th most underrated song, calling it "a superb showcase for the grittier, soulful side of Henley's voice" and praising "the taste and restraint [the Eagles] showed in not overplaying, letting the chords, melody and vocal deliver the true intent." Classic Rock critic Paul Lester rated it the best song on Hotel California, saying that it stays on "the right side of schmaltzy" while "Henley evokes end-of-an-era innocence like there’s no tomorrow." Eagles FAQ author Andrew Vaughan praised Henley's vocal performance in interpreting the lyrics, and noted that the song outdid "Desperado" by incorporating "a world-weary sadness that only experience could have delivered with such integrity."

In a contemporaneous review, Los Angeles Times critic Robert Hilburn praised it as an "interesting tune", saying that it is "the kind of deeply intense torch song that someone like Dan Penn or Spooner Oldham might have come up with a few years ago for Aretha Franklin." On the other hand, in the original Rolling Stone review of Hotel California, Charley Walters called "Wasted Time" an "over arranged wash embodying the worst of rock-cum-Hollywood sensibilities."

"Wasted Time" was included on the Eagles' compilation albums Selected Works: 1972–1999 in 2000 and The Very Best Of in 2003. Live versions were included on the live albums Eagles Live in 1980, Hell Freezes Over in 1994 and Farewell 1 Tour: Live from Melbourne in 2005.

== Reprise ==
On the original LP record of Hotel California, "Wasted Time" was the last song of side 1 of the album. Since the Eagles intended Hotel California to be a concept album, they provided continuity by beginning side 2 with a short instrumental reprise of the song. Lester rated the reprise to the 3rd best song on Hotel California, saying that "its sweeping grandeur would have made it the ideal instrumental coda to a Hollywood movie based on the album."
