= Seven Bridges Road =

1969 song by Steve Young

Single by Steve Young

from the album Rock Salt & Nails
- B-side: "Many Rivers"
- Released: 1969
- Recorded: 1969
- Genre: Country rock
- Length: 3:22
- Label: Reprise
- Songwriter: Steve Young
- Producer: Paul Tannen

"Seven Bridges Road" is a song written by American musician Steve Young, recorded in 1969 for his Rock Salt & Nails album. It has since been covered by many artists, the best-known versions being a five-part harmony arrangement by English musician Iain Matthews in 1973 and a similar version recorded by the American rock band the Eagles in 1980.

== Composition and original recording ==
"Seven Bridges Road" is an ode to Woodley Road (County Road 39, Montgomery County, Alabama), a rural two-lane road which runs south off East Fairview Avenue — the southern boundary of the Cloverdale neighborhood of Montgomery, Alabama — at Cloverdale Road, and which features seven bridges: three pairs of bridges, and the seventh approximately one mile south by itself. The song's composer, Steve Young, stated that he and his friends "used to go out to Woodley Road carousing around": "I wound up writing this song that I never dreamed anybody would even relate to, or understand, or get. And I still don't understand why it was so successful, actually." "I don't know [exactly] what [the] song means." "Consciously... I [just] wrote... a song about a girl and a road in south Alabama." "But I think on another level the song has something kind of cosmic... that registers in the subconscious: the number seven has all of these religious and mystical connotations."

Living on-and-off in Montgomery in the early 1960s, Young stated that he made "a few close friends there who were very different than the mainstream [locals. These friends told] me about this...Seven Bridges Road...As you went out into the countryside the road became this dirt road, and you crossed seven bridges, and then it was almost like an old Disney scene or something, with these high bank dirt roads and trees hanging down, old cemeteries, and so on. It was very beautiful...and on a moonlit night it was exceedingly beautiful." Young initially believed that Seven Bridges Road was his friends' personal byname for Woodley Road, stating, "I found out later that [it] had been called that for a long, long time. A lot of people over the years had been struck by the beauty of the road, and the folk name for it was Seven Bridges Road." Journalist Wayne Greenhaw in his book My Heart Is in the Earth: True Stories of Alabama & Mexico (Red River Publishing/ 2001) relates how on a Sunday in springtime he accompanied Young and their friend Jimmy Evans on a drive down Woodley Road to Orion for a guitar jam session with bluesman C. P. Austin, and that it was on the return trip up Woodley Road that Young began the composition of Seven Bridges Road. Jimmy Evans, then Young's roommate and later Attorney General of Alabama, recalled frequenting Woodley Road, including the specific visit which triggered Young's writing the song, stating, "I'd go down [Woodley Road] to Orion a lot to listen to... C. P. Austin...There [were] seven wooden bridges [on Woodley] and we'd go out there a lot... I thought it was the most beautiful place around Montgomery that I'd ever seen. That road was a cavern of moss; it looked like a tunnel."..."[One] night [when] there was a full moon... we were in my Oldsmobile, and when I stopped Steve got out on the right side fender. We sat there a while, and he started writing down words." Evans recalls that after beginning to write the song on Woodley Road that night, Young completed his composition at the apartment he and Evans shared in Montgomery's Capitol Heights neighborhood.

Young's own recollection was that the final version "was put together over a period of several years. Sometimes I'd say [to myself] 'good song'. Then I'd say nobody could relate to a song like this." Young did play a completed version of the song at a gig in Montgomery - according to Jimmy Evans, Young's said his local performing venue was the Shady Grove club and stated, "it got a big reaction. I was very surprised and thought it just because it was a local known thing and that was why they liked it." When Young did approach a Hollywood-based music publisher in 1969 with Seven Bridges Road he was advised the song "wasn't commercial enough." Seven Bridges Road was not originally intended for inclusion on the Rock Salt & Nails album; in fact, Young states album producer Tommy LiPuma "didn't want me to record original songs. He wanted me to be strictly a singer and interpreter of folk songs and country standards." However, in Young's words: "One day we ran out of songs to record [for Rock Salt & Nails] in the studio... I started playing Seven Bridges Road. LiPuma interjected: 'You know I don't want to hear original stuff.' But [guitarist] James Burton said, 'Hey, this song sounds good and it is ready, let's put it down... After it was recorded, LiPuma had to admit that, original or not, it was good." Subsequent to the song's introduction on A&M's 1969 Rock Salt & Nails, Young remade the song three more times: on his Reprise Records 1972 album entitled Seven Bridges Road and on his RCA Victor 1978 album No Place to Fall, as well as his 1981 reissue album for Rounder Records again entitled Seven Bridges Road; this 1981 album being a hybrid reissue/archival release, with five tracks from Young's '72 LP of the same name, with four outtakes from the original sessions as well as Young's last studio version of "Seven Bridges Road."

== Iain Matthews version/Eagles version ==
"Seven Bridges Road"

Single by Eagles

from the album Eagles Live
- B-side: "The Long Run (live)" (4:08)
- Released: 15 December 1980
- Recorded: 28 July 1980
- Genre: Country rock
- Length: 3:02
- Label: Asylum 2051
- Songwriter: Steve Young
- Producer: Bill Szymczyk

Eagles singles chronology
"I Can't Tell You Why" (1980)	"Seven Bridges Road" (1980)	"Get Over It" (1994)

"Seven Bridges Road" would have its highest profile incarnation due to a 1980 live recording by Eagles whose 4/4 time signature and close harmony vocal arrangement are borrowed from a recording made by Iain Matthews from his August 1973 album release Valley Hi. Matthews' album was recorded with producer Michael Nesmith at the latter's Countryside Ranch studio in North Hills, Los Angeles: Nesmith would recall of Matthews' recording of "Seven Bridges Road": "Ian and I put it together and [we] sang about six or seven part harmony on the thing, and I played acoustic. It turned out to be a beautiful record[ing]". On the similarity of the Eagles' later version, Nesmith would state: "Son of a gun if...Don [Henley] or somebody in the Eagles didn't lift [our] arrangement absolutely note for note for vocal harmony...If they can't think it up themselves [and] they've got to steal it from somebody else, better they should steal it...from me I guess." Matthews would recall that, in 1973, he and the members of the Eagles were acquainted through frequenting the Troubadour: "we were forever going back to somebody's house and playing music. Don Henley had a copy of 'Valley Hi' that he liked, so I've no doubt about that being where their version of the song came from."

Eagles recorded "Seven Bridges Road" for their Eagles Live concert album. According to band member Don Felder, when Eagles first began playing stadiums the group would warm up pre-concert by singing "Seven Bridges Road" in a locker room shower area. Afterwards, each concert would then open with the group's five members singing "Seven Bridges Road" a capella into a single microphone. Felder recalls that it "blew [the audience] away. It was always a vocally unifying moment, all five voices coming together in harmony." Following the release of the Hotel California album, that set's title cut replaced "Seven Bridges Road" as the Eagles' concert opener, and according to Felder, the band "rarely even bothered to rehearse with it in the shower of the dressing room anymore." The song was restored to the set list for the Eagles' tour prior to the band's 31 July 1980 breakup with the band's performance of the song at their 28 July 1980 concert at the Santa Monica Civic Auditorium, which was recorded for the Eagles Live album released in November 1980. They issued it as a single, with "The Long Run (live)" as its B-side; the song reached No. 21 on the U.S. Billboard Hot 100 becoming the group's final Top 40 hit until "Get Over It" by the reunited band in 1994. "Seven Bridges Road" also became the third Eagles' single to appear on the Billboard C&W chart, reaching No. 55 there. At the time the Eagles charted with "Seven Bridges Road" the song's composer Steve Young commented, "I didn't like the Eagles' version at first. I thought it was too bluegrassy, too gospel. But the more I hear it, the better it sounds."

== Ricochet version ==
"Seven Bridges Road"

Single by Ricochet

from the album What You Leave Behind
- A-side: "Do I Love You Enough"
- B-side: "Seven Bridges Road"
- Released: 17 March 2000
- Recorded: Sound Stage Studio; Nashville TN; 1999
- Genre: Country rock
- Length: 3:06
- Label: Columbia 79379
- Songwriter: Steve Young
- Producers: Ron Chancey, Blake Chancey

Ricochet singles chronology
"Can't Stop Thinkin' 'Bout That" (1998)	"Seven Bridges Road" (2000)	"Do I Love You Enough" (2000)

Ricochet, who had been performing "Seven Bridges Road" in concert, recorded the song in 1998 in the sessions for the intended album release What a Ride. After two advance singles from What a Ride: "Honky Tonk Baby" and "Can't Stop Thinkin' 'Bout That," had fallen short of the Top 40 of the C&W chart, the track "Seven Bridges Road" was sent to C&W radio 19 April 1999. The track's sepia tone promo video - filmed on Woodley Road on 22–23 March 1999 and mostly comprising footage of trysting couples shown at various times during the 20th century - received strong support from CMT: however the track itself only rose to No. 48 on the C&W chart, and the release of its parent What a Ride album - intended for July 1999 - was canceled. "Seven Bridges Road" was ultimately included on Ricochet's 2000 album release, What You Leave Behind, with the track serving as B-side of that album's first single, "Do I Love You Enough". "Seven Bridges Road" is performed live by Ricochet on the band's 2004 concert album The Live Album.
