= Hotel California 2020 Tour =

2019–23 concert tour by the Eagles

- North American tour by Eagles
- Promotional poster for the tour
- Associated album: Hotel California
- Start date: September 27, 2019
- End date: April 8, 2023
- Legs: 5
- No. of shows: 76 in United States; 7 in Canada; 83 total

Eagles concert chronology
- An Evening with the Eagles (2017–2019); Hotel California 2020 Tour (2019–2023); The Long Goodbye Tour (2023)

The Hotel California 2020 Tour (also known as the Hotel California 2021 Tour and Hotel California 2022 Tour and Hotel California 2023 Tour) was a concert tour by American rock band Eagles commemorating their 1976 album, Hotel California. The tour began on 7 February 2020, in Atlanta, at the State Farm Arena, after three Las Vegas concerts in September 2019 received rave reviews and more dates were announced.

== Background ==
The band performed the 1976 Grammy-winning album from "beginning to end." "Each night's concert will feature a 'Hotel California' set, with an accompanying orchestra and choir, followed by an additional set of the band's greatest hits," the band's website said. The setlist for the two shows performed in Las Vegas in September 2019 was one of the longest setlists the band had ever played, each show lasting for approximately three hours. The setlist remained the same for the 2020 leg of dates, but the setlists varied slightly in length for the 2021 and 2022 dates.

The band performed with an orchestra accompaniment at each show for select songs. The orchestra comprised both local and touring musicians, and was conducted by Jim Ed Norman, who wrote the original orchestrations for the Hotel California album.

The first two legs featured Deacon Frey and country artist Vince Gill since they joined the band in 2017 after the death of founding member Glenn Frey in 2016.

On March 21, 2020, the band announced the postponement of their North American tour due to the COVID-19 pandemic. On May 1, 2020, band announced the tour would be further postponed to 2021 due to concerns related to the pandemic.

It was announced on February 17, 2022 that Deacon Frey would not be participating in the upcoming leg of the “Hotel California” tour due to an unspecified illness. The band subsequently announced on April 6, 2022 that Frey would be leaving the group for a solo career, until his return to the band in July the following year prior to the group's final tour.

== Shows ==
Welcome to the Hotel California
Date (2019)	City	Country	Venue
September 27	Las Vegas	United States	MGM Grand Garden Arena
September 28	Las Vegas	United States	MGM Grand Garden Arena
October 5	Las Vegas	United States	MGM Grand Garden Arena

Hotel California 2020 Tour
Date (2020)	City	Country	Venue
February 7	Atlanta	United States	State Farm Arena
February 8	Atlanta	United States	State Farm Arena
February 11	Atlanta	United States	State Farm Arena
February 14	New York City	United States	Madison Square Garden
February 15	New York City	United States	Madison Square Garden
February 18	New York City	United States	Madison Square Garden
February 29	Dallas	United States	American Airlines Center
March 1	Dallas	United States	American Airlines Center
March 6	Houston	United States	Toyota Center
March 7	Houston	United States	Toyota Center

Hotel California 2021 Tour
Date (2021)	City	Country	Venue
August 22	New York City	United States	Madison Square Garden
August 24	New York City	United States	Madison Square Garden
August 27	Boston	United States	TD Garden
August 28	Boston	United States	TD Garden
August 31	Washington, D.C.	United States	Capital One Arena
September 1	Washington, D.C.	United States	Capital One Arena
September 16 (Note: The concert on September 16, 2021, at the Pepsi Center in Denver was originally scheduled to take place on March 26, 2020, but was postponed to September 18, 2020 before being postponed to 2021 due to the ongoing coronavirus pandemic.)	Denver	United States	Ball Arena
September 18 (Note: The concert on September 18, 2021, at the Pepsi Center in Denver was originally scheduled to take place on March 28, 2020, but was postponed to September 19, 2020 before being postponed to 2021 due to the ongoing coronavirus pandemic.)	Denver	United States	Ball Arena
September 20	Dallas	United States	American Airlines Center
September 21 (Note: The concert on September 21, 2021, at the American Airlines Center in Dallas was originally scheduled to take place on March 17, 2020, but was postponed to October 21, 2020 before being postponed to 2021 due to the ongoing coronavirus pandemic.)	Dallas	United States	American Airlines Center
September 24 (Note: The concert on September 24, 2021, at the Talking Stick Resort Arena in Phoenix was originally scheduled to take place on April 21, 2020, but was postponed to October 24, 2020 before being postponed to 2021 due to the ongoing coronavirus pandemic.)	Phoenix	United States	Footprint Center
September 25 (Note: The concert on September 25, 2021, at the Talking Stick Resort Arena in Phoenix was originally scheduled to take place on April 26, 2020, but was postponed to October 25, 2020 before being postponed to 2021 due to the ongoing coronavirus pandemic.)	Phoenix	United States	Footprint Center
September 28	Omaha	United States	CHI Health Center Omaha
October 1 (Note: The concert on October 1, 2021, at the Xcel Energy Center in Saint Paul was originally scheduled to take place on April 3, 2020, but was postponed to October 16, 2020 before being postponed to 2021 due to the ongoing coronavirus pandemic.)	Saint Paul	United States	Xcel Energy Center
October 2 (Note: The concert on October 2, 2021, at the Xcel Energy Center in Saint Paul was originally scheduled to take place on April 4, 2020, but was postponed to October 17, 2020 before being postponed to 2021 due to the ongoing coronavirus pandemic.)	Saint Paul	United States	Xcel Energy Center
October 12	Sacramento	United States	Golden 1 Center
October 15 (Note: The concert on October 15, 2021, at The Forum in Inglewood was originally scheduled to take place on April 17, 2020, but was postponed to September 25, 2020 before being further postponed to 2021 due to the ongoing coronavirus pandemic.)	Inglewood	United States	The Forum
October 16 (Note: The concert on October 16, 2021, at The Forum in Inglewood was originally scheduled to take place on April 18, 2020, but was postponed to September 26, 2020 before being further postponed to 2021 due to the ongoing coronavirus pandemic.)	Inglewood	United States	The Forum
October 19 (Note: The concert on October 19, 2021, at The Forum in Inglewood was originally scheduled to take place on April 24, 2020, but was postponed to September 29, 2020 before being further postponed to 2021 due to the ongoing coronavirus pandemic.)	Inglewood	United States	The Forum
October 22 (Note: The concert on October 22, 2021, at the Chase Center in San Francisco was originally scheduled to take place on April 11, 2020, but was postponed to October 2, 2020 before being further postponed to 2021 due to the ongoing coronavirus pandemic.)	San Francisco	United States	Chase Center
October 23 (Note: The concert on October 23, 2021, at the Chase Center in San Francisco was originally scheduled to take place on April 12, 2020, but was postponed to October 3, 2020 before being further postponed to 2021 due to the ongoing coronavirus pandemic.)	San Francisco	United States	Chase Center
November 5	Seattle	United States	Climate Pledge Arena
November 6	Seattle	United States	Climate Pledge Arena

Hotel California 2022 Tour
Date (2022)	City	Country	Venue
February 19	Savannah	United States	Enmarket Arena
February 21	Charlotte	United States	Spectrum Center
February 24	Orlando	United States	Amway Center
February 25	Sunrise	United States	FLA Live Arena
February 28	Tampa	United States	Amalie Arena
March 2	Raleigh	United States	PNC Arena
March 4	Atlanta	United States	State Farm Arena
March 17	Cleveland	United States	Rocket Mortgage FieldHouse
March 19	Chicago	United States	United Center
March 22	Indianapolis	United States	Gainbridge Fieldhouse
March 24	Detroit	United States	Little Caesars Arena
March 26	Pittsburgh	United States	PPG Paints Arena
March 28	Philadelphia	United States	Wells Fargo Center
March 30	Milwaukee	United States	Fiserv Forum
April 19	Columbus	United States	Nationwide Arena
April 21	Buffalo	United States	KeyBank Center
April 23	Elmont	United States	UBS Arena
April 25	Greenville	United States	Bon Secours Wellness Arena
April 28	Nashville	United States	Bridgestone Arena
April 29	Nashville	United States	Bridgestone Arena
May 12	Louisville	United States	KFC Yum! Center
May 14	Houston	United States	Toyota Center
May 16	Tulsa	United States	BOK Center
May 19	Austin	United States	Moody Center
May 20	Austin	United States	Moody Center
May 25	Salt Lake City	United States	Vivint Arena
May 28	Las Vegas	United States	MGM Grand Garden Arena
September 9	Toronto	Canada	Scotiabank Arena
September 10	Toronto	Canada	Scotiabank Arena
September 13	Ottawa	Canada	Canadian Tire Centre
September 16	Winnipeg	Canada	Canada Life Centre
September 18	Saskatoon	Canada	SaskTel Centre
September 20	Edmonton	Canada	Rogers Place
September 22	Vancouver	Canada	Rogers Arena
November 15	St. Louis	United States	Enterprise Center
November 17	Des Moines	United States	Wells Fargo Arena
November 19	New Orleans	United States	Smoothie King Center
November 21	Birmingham	United States	Legacy Arena
November 23	Kansas City	United States	T-Mobile Center
November 25	Fort Worth	United States	Dickies Arena
November 27	North Little Rock	United States	Simmons Bank Arena

Hotel California 2023 Tour
Date (2023)	City	Country	Venue
February 19	Portland	United States	Moda Center
February 21	San Jose	United States	SAP Center
February 24	Thousand Palms	United States	Acrisure Arena
February 25	Thousand Palms	United States	Acrisure Arena
March 1	Phoenix	United States	Footprint Center
March 3	San Diego	United States	Pechanga Arena
March 25	Jacksonville	United States	VyStar Veterans Memorial Arena
March 28	Tampa	United States	Amalie Arena
March 30	Columbia	United States	Colonial Life Arena
April 1	Knoxville	United States	Thompson-Boling Arena
April 4	Greensboro	United States	Greensboro Coliseum Complex
April 7	Newark	United States	Prudential Center
April 8	Baltimore	United States	CFG Bank Arena

List of cancelled shows
Date	City	Country	Venue	Reason
May 24, 2020	Los Cabos	Mexico	Cabo En Vivo	COVID-19 pandemic
August 28, 2021	London	England	Wembley Stadium	COVID-19 pandemic
August 29, 2021	London	England	Wembley Stadium	COVID-19 pandemic

=== Box office ===
Date	City	Venue	Attendance	Revenue
September 16, 18	Denver	Ball Arena	24,621	$5,909,719
September 24–25	Phoenix	Footprint Center	23,498	$5,595,557
October 15–16, 19	Inglewood	The Forum	39,091	$8,974,221
October 22–23	San Francisco	Chase Center	23,406	$6,332,596

== Band members ==
=== Eagles ===
- Don Henley – vocals, drums, rhythm guitar, percussion
- Joe Walsh – vocals, guitars, keyboards
- Timothy B. Schmit – vocals, bass guitar
- Deacon Frey – vocals, guitars (2019-2021 shows)
- Vince Gill – vocals, guitars

=== Additional musicians ===
- Michael Thompson – piano, keyboards, accordion, backing vocals
- Will Hollis – keyboards, organ, backing vocals
- Scott Crago – drums, percussion
- Steuart Smith – guitars, backing vocals
