= Let's kill all the lawyers =

Quote from William Shakespeare's Henry VI

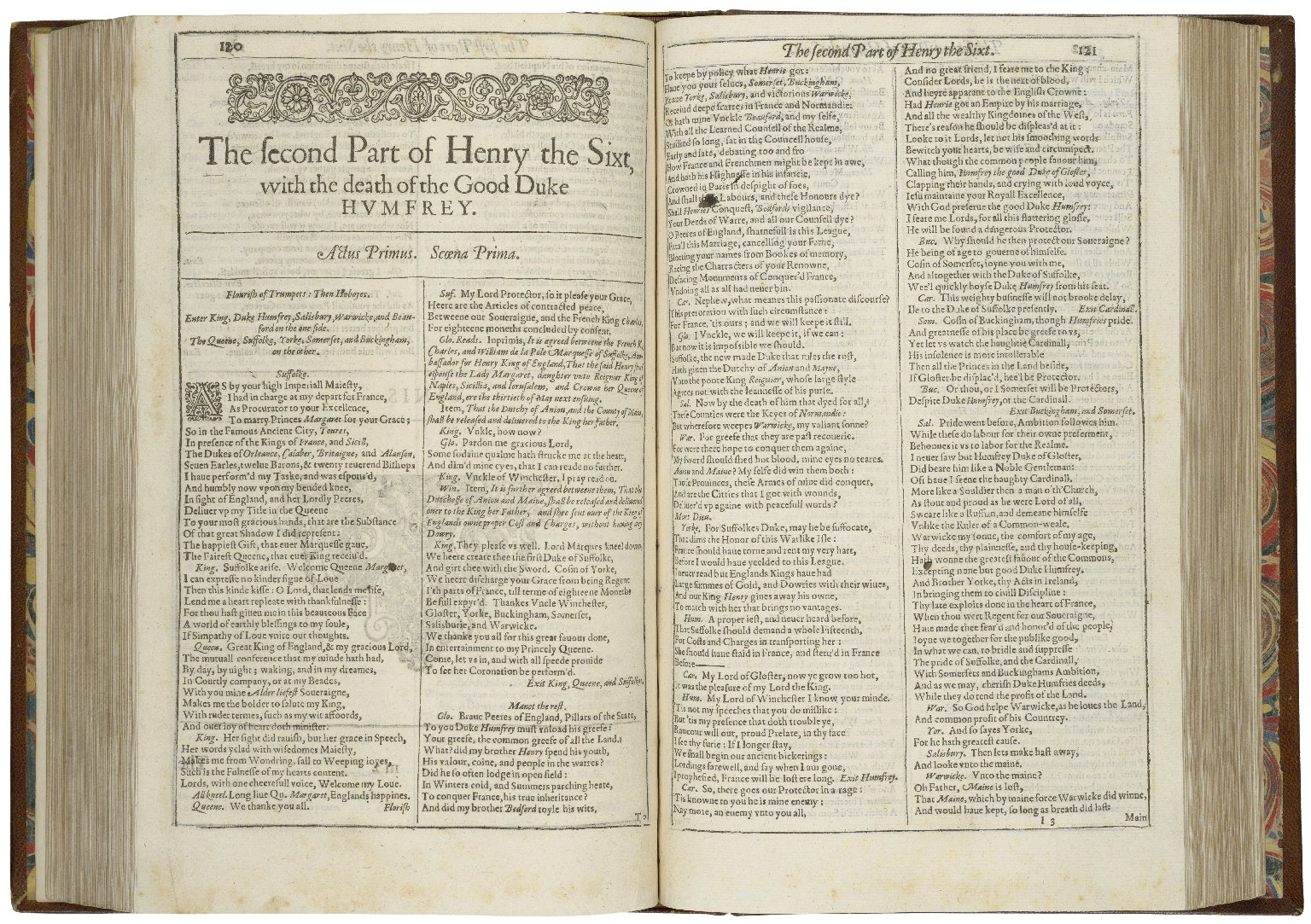
The title page of The second Part of Henry the Sixt, with the death of the Good Duke Humfrey from the First Folio (1623).

In English literature, "Let's kill all the lawyers" is a phrase from a line of dialogue spoken by a henchman in the history play Henry VI, Part 2 (1591), by William Shakespeare. Although the truncated form is the usual quotation, the full line of dialogue is: "The first thing we do, let's kill all the lawyers", spoken in conversation between the rebel leader Jack Cade and his henchman, Dick the Butcher, in scene 2 of Act IV (4.2.76–77).

Popular usage of the phrase "Let's kill all the lawyers" usually is negative: as criticism of how lawyers use the law to maintain the privileges and perquisites of the rich and of the ruling class; as criticism of the bureaucratic nature of legal process and legal procedure; as criticism of the easy corruption and perversion of the rule of law; occasionally as back-hand praise of how lawyers confront the tribalism, partisanship and herd mentality to thwart mob violence in the public sphere of society; and acknowledges that eliminating lawyers as the guardians of the rule of law removes a major impediment to the path to more power, and a step in the direction of a totalitarian form of government.

== Analysis ==
In the second scene of Act IV of Henry VI, Part 2 (1591), the playwright Shakespeare makes light of royal politics when Dick the Butcher suggests that killing every lawyer of the realm is one way by which the pretenders to the English throne might improve England. Like the other henchmen to Cade's rebellion, Dick the Butcher is a man of evil character, hence his expeditiously lethal solution to a societal problem usually resolved by lengthy legal process.

== The quotation ==
JACK CADE. Valiant I am.

SMITH [aside]. A must needs; for beggary is valiant.

JACK CADE. I am able to endure much.

DICK THE BUTCHER [aside]. No question of that; for I have seen him whipp'd three market-days together.

JACK CADE. I fear neither sword nor fire.

SMITH [aside]. He need not fear the sword; for his coat is of proof.

DICK THE BUTCHER [aside]. But methinks he should stand in fear of fire, being burnt i' th' hand for stealing of sheep.

JACK CADE. Be brave, then; for your captain is brave, and vows reformation. There shall be in England seven half-penny loaves sold for a penny: the three-hoop'd pot shall have ten hoops; and I will make it felony to drink small beer: all the realm shall be in common; and in Cheapside shall my palfrey go to grass: and when I am king,— as king I will be, —

ALL. God save your majesty!

JACK CADE. I thank you, good people: — there shall be no money; all shall eat and drink on my score; and I will apparel them all in one livery, that they may agree like brothers, and worship me their lord.

DICK THE BUTCHER. The first thing we do, let's kill all the lawyers.

JACK CADE. Nay, that I mean to do. Is not this a lamentable thing, that of the skin of an innocent lamb should be made parchment, that parchment, being scribbl'd o'er, should undo a man? Some say the bee stings; but I say 'tis the bee's wax, for I did but seal once to a thing, and I was never mine own man since.

—William Shakespeare

== Other uses ==
The quotation "Let's kill all the lawyers, kill 'em tonight" features in the lyrics to the song "Get Over It", by the band The Eagles. The expeditious killing of lawyers is quoted in the "Encounter at Farpoint" episode of the science fiction TV show Star Trek: The Next Generation, and in the Crazy Ex-Girlfriend T.V. show, the Shakespearean allusion is in the lyrics of the song "Don't Be a Lawyer": "Sure, your parents might think you're a failure / But no one's ever said: 'First, let's kill all the tailors'." In Star Wars novels, Darth Plagueis cites the phrase "First, let's kill all the Jedi."

Beryl Howell, a judge in the United States District Court for the District of Columbia, cited the line in her ruling in Perkins Coie v. Department of Justice, concerning an executive order issued by Donald Trump which purported to ban the executive branch from employing the law firm Perkins Coie. She found the order unconstitutional and blocked its enforcement. After describing its context in the play, she said that "Eliminating lawyers as the guardians of the rule of law removes a major impediment to the path to more power."

== See also ==
- List of idioms attributed to Shakespeare
