= Loree Rodkin =

American jewelry designer (born 1949)

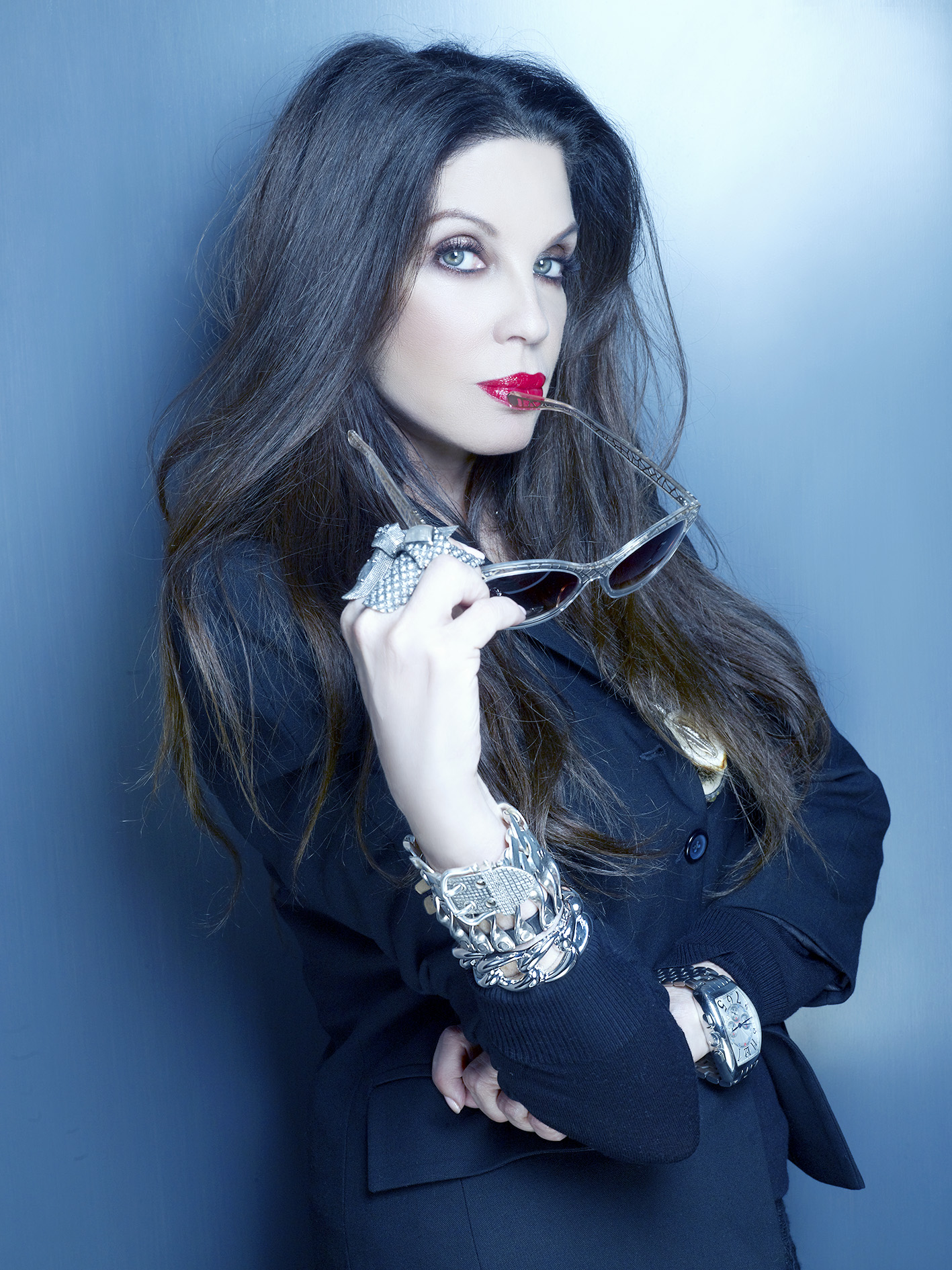
- Born: February 25, 1949 (age 77); Chicago, Illinois, U.S.
- Occupation: Jewelry designer

Loree Rodkin (born February 25, 1949) is an American jewelry designer based in Los Angeles, California. She designed the jewelry worn by Michelle Obama to the inaugural ball in January 2009, now deposited in the permanent collection of the Smithsonian Institution.

== Biography ==
Rodkin was raised in Chicago, Illinois. She is Jewish. She moved to Los Angeles where she designed homes for Alice Cooper, Rod Stewart and her then fiance, Bernie Taupin. Her next career was as a talent manager. She managed the careers of Brad Pitt, Robert Downey Jr. and Alexander Godunov, among others.

Rodkin's relationships also included actor Richard Gere and musician Don Henley. Her break-up with Henley inspired lyrics in the Eagles' iconic 1977 song "Hotel California": "Her mind is Tiffany-twisted, she got the Mercedes bends / She got a lot of pretty pretty boys she calls friends." She was also the muse that inspired Wasted Time (Eagles song) and I'm Still Standing by Bernie Taupin, as mentioned in his autobiography, 'Scattershot' pp. 255-258..

Loree Rodkin has lived in Manhattan, but is now based in Los Angeles, California.

== Designs ==
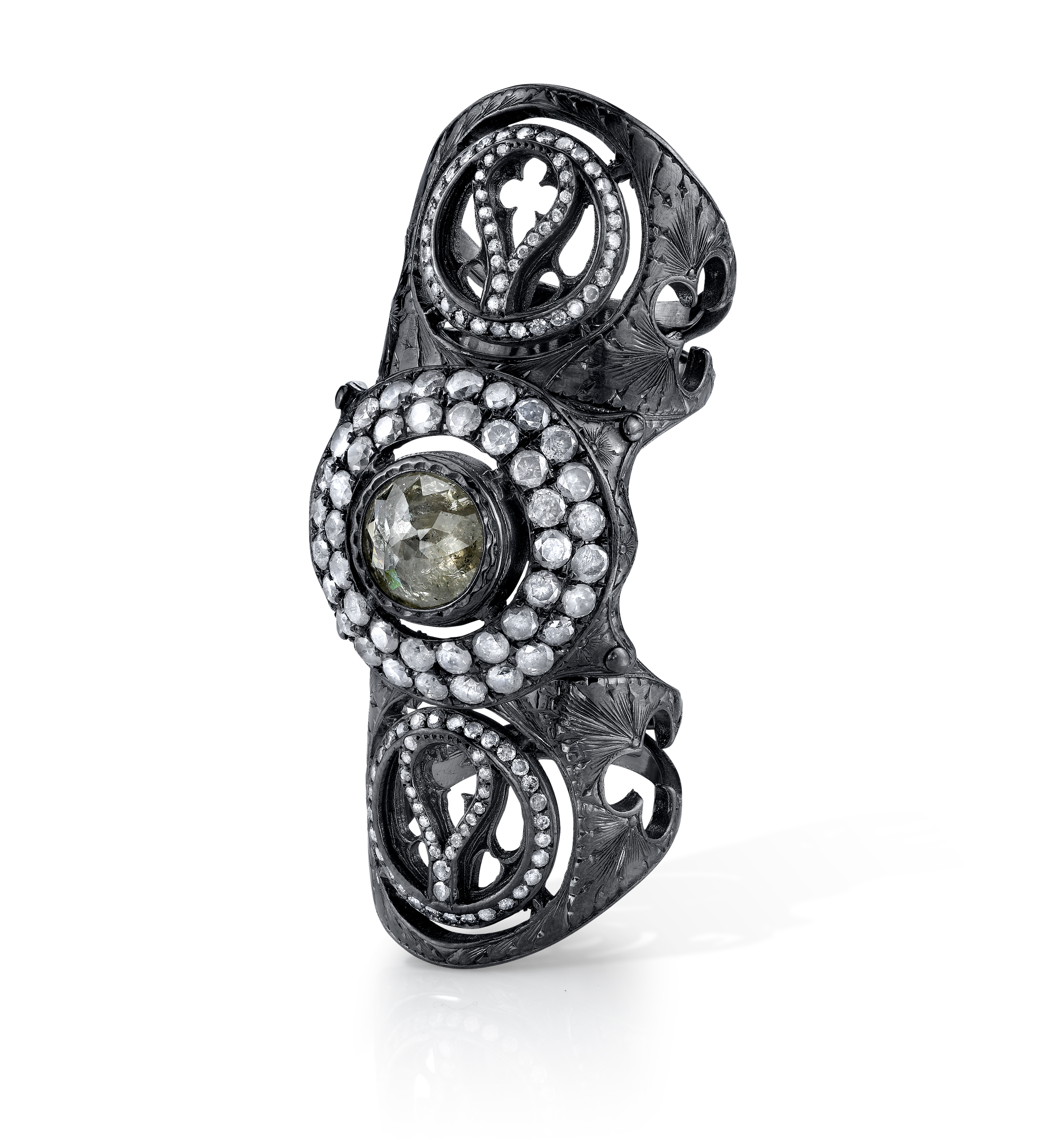
Bondage ring designed by Loree Rodkin

While working as an interior home designer for celebrity clients, Rodkin came across worn jewelry that she would buy and repair. These experiences led her to six years later oversee her own jewelry design studio and launch a collection of Gothic-inspired jewelry called Loree Rodkins Gothic. Her first sales were to Tommy Perse, then owner of the Maxfield boutique in West Hollywood. Elizabeth Taylor and Barbra Streisand were among her earliest clients. Her most famous piece is a bondage ring, reminiscent of medieval finger armor.

Her designs were further popularized by First Lady Michelle Obama, who wore Rodkin's 61-carat diamond celestial earrings, a 13-carat diamond cocktail ring and diamond bangles, to the 2009 inaugural balls. The jewelry now hangs in the permanent collection at the National Museum of American History of the Smithsonian Institution.

Rodkin's flagship store is in Tokyo, Japan. Her designs are also sold in retail specialty stores globally. Her clientele has included Elton John, Mary-Kate and Ashley Olsen, Madonna, Daphne Guinness, Mary J. Blige, Cher, Rihanna and Steven Tyler. Rodkin's collection includes a bath and body product line, eyewear, fragrances and candles. In 2014, she launched a jewelry line, Hunrod, with French designer Michèle Lamy. She collaborated with perfumer and Hennessy heir Kilian Hennessy to launch a niche perfume line, called By Kilian, in 2016.

Rodkin's jewelry designs employ elements of Art Nouveau and Gothic stylings. She makes use of symbolism, engraving and works with precious stones, gold and platinum. Crosses have also been an important element in Rodkin's brand since she founded it in the 1980s, which she has used to evoke a medieval fashion style.

== Other activities ==
Rodkin helped redesign the Beverly Hills tiki bar, Luau, opened by concert promoter Andrew Hewitt in 2008.
