= Hotel California =

1977 single by Eagles

- Side A of the US single

Single by Eagles

from the album Hotel California
- B-side: "Pretty Maids All in a Row"
- Released: February 22, 1977 (Single)
- Studio: Record Plant (Los Angeles); Criteria (Miami)
- Genre: Rock
- Length: 6:30 (album version); 6:08 (single version)
- Label: Asylum
- Songwriters: Don Felder; Don Henley; Glenn Frey
- Producer: Bill Szymczyk

Eagles singles chronology
"New Kid in Town" (1976)	"Hotel California" (1977)	"Life in the Fast Lane" (1977)

Audio sample
- Eagles – "Hotel California": file; help

Audio
- "Hotel California" on YouTube

"Hotel California" is a song by the American rock band Eagles, released as the second single of their 1976 album Hotel California on February 22, 1977. It was written by Don Felder (music), Glenn Frey, and Don Henley (lyrics). It features Henley on lead vocals and concludes with a long electric guitar solo by Felder and Joe Walsh, in which they take turns playing the lead before harmonizing and playing arpeggios.

"Hotel California" is one of the best-known recordings by the Eagles. In 1998, its guitar solo was voted the best all time by readers of Guitarist. It was awarded the Grammy Award for Record of the Year in 1978. Fans and critics have discussed the meaning of the lyrics. The Eagles described the song as their "interpretation of the high life in Los Angeles". In the 2013 documentary History of the Eagles, Henley said it was about "a journey from innocence to experience ... that's all."

"Hotel California" has been widely regarded as one of the greatest rock songs of all time, and has been covered by many artists. The filmmaker Julia Phillips proposed adapting it into a film, but the Eagles disliked the idea and it never came to fruition.

"Hotel California" reached number 1 on the Billboard Hot 100 and the top ten of several international charts. The Eagles have performed "Hotel California" over a thousand times live, and it is the third-most performed of all their songs, after "Desperado" and "Take It Easy".

== History ==
=== Composition ===
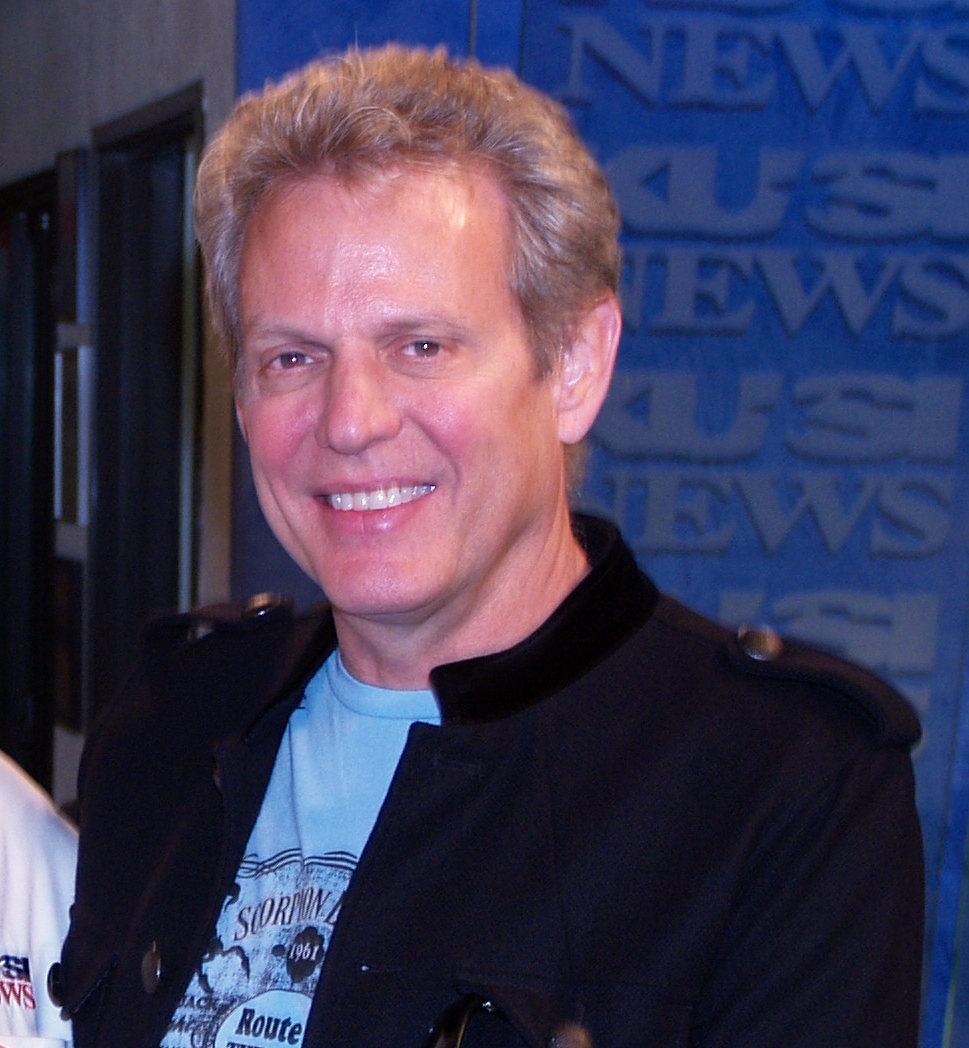
Don Felder composed the melody for "Hotel California".

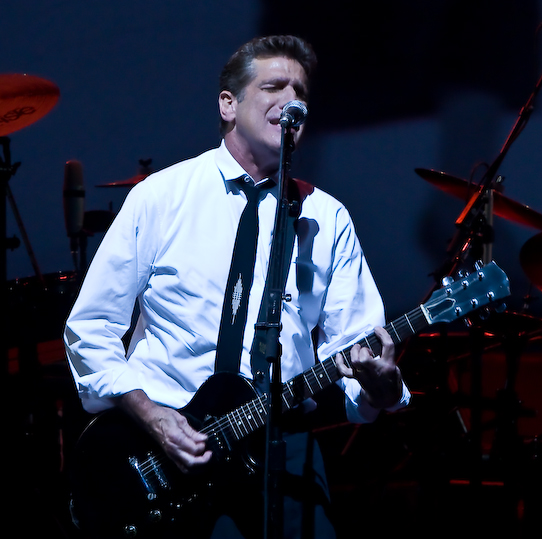
Glenn Frey provided the outline of "Hotel California".

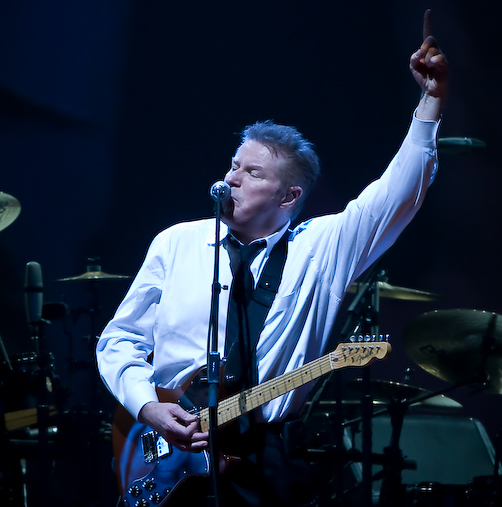
Don Henley wrote the lyrics to "Hotel California" with Frey.

Don Felder developed a demo of the instrumental in a rented house on Malibu Beach. He recorded the basic tracks with a Rhythm Ace drum machine and added a 12-string guitar on a four-track recording deck in his spare bedroom, then mixed in a bassline, and gave Don Henley and Glenn Frey copies of the recording. Felder, who met the Eagles through his high school bandmate Bernie Leadon, said Leadon advised him to make tapes of songs he wrote for the band so that other band members like Henley, whose forte was in lyrics, might work with him on finishing the songs they liked. His demos were always instrumental, and on every album project he would submit 15 or 16 ideas. The demo he made for "Hotel California" showed influences from Latin and reggae music, and it grabbed the attention of Henley, who said he liked the song that "sounds like a Mexican reggae or Bolero", which gave the song its first working title, "Mexican Reggae". Record World said that "a mild reggae flavor pervades the tune".

Frey and Henley were both interested in the tune after hearing the demo, and discussed the concept for the lyrics. In 2008, Felder described the writing of the lyrics:

Don Henley and Glenn wrote most of the words. All of us kind of drove into L.A. at night. Nobody was from California, and if you drive into L.A. at night [...] you can just see this glow on the horizon of lights, and the images that start running through your head of Hollywood and all the dreams that you have, and so it was kind of about that [...] what we started writing the song about.

Henley decided on the theme of "Hotel California", noting how The Beverly Hills Hotel had become a literal and symbolic focal point of their lives at that time. Henley said of their personal and professional experience in LA: "We were getting an extensive education, in life, in love, in business. Beverly Hills was still a mythical place to us. In that sense it became something of a symbol, and the 'Hotel' the locus of all that LA had come to mean for us. In a sentence, I'd sum it up as the end of the innocence, round one."

Frey came up with a cinematic scenario of a person who, tired from driving a long distance in a desert, saw a place for a rest and pulled in for the night, but entered "a weird world peopled by freaky characters", and became "quickly spooked by the claustrophobic feeling of being caught in a disturbing web from which he may never escape". In an interview with Cameron Crowe, Frey said that he and Henley wanted the song "to open like an episode of the Twilight Zone", and added: "We take this guy and make him like a character in The Magus, where every time he walks through a door there's a new version of reality. We wanted to write a song just like it was a movie." Frey described the song in an interview with NBC's Bob Costas as a cinematic montage "just one shot to the next [...] a picture of a guy on the highway, a picture of the hotel, the guy walks in, the door opens, strange people". Frey continued: "We decided to create something strange, just to see if we could do it." Henley then wrote most of the lyrics based on Frey's idea, and sought inspiration for the writing by driving out into the desert as well as from films and theater.

Part of the lyrics, such as "Her mind is Tiffany-twisted, she got the Mercedes bends / She got a lot of pretty pretty boys she calls friends", are based on Henley's break-up with his girlfriend Loree Rodkin. According to Frey's liner notes for The Very Best Of, the use of the word steely in the lyric "They stab it with their steely knives, but they just can't kill the beast" was a playful nod to the band Steely Dan, who had included the lyric "Turn up the Eagles, the neighbors are listening" in their song "Everything You Did". Frey had also said that the writing of the song was inspired by the boldness of Steely Dan's lyrics and its willingness to go "out there", and thought that the song they wrote had "achieved perfect ambiguity."

=== Recordings ===
The Eagles recorded the track with Don Henley on lead vocal three times, twice at the Record Plant in Los Angeles and finally at the Criteria Studios in Miami. They first recorded a riff, but when it came to recording the vocal, it was found to be in too high a key for Henley's voice, so Felder progressively lowered the key from E minor, eventually settling on B minor. The second recording, however, was judged too fast. In Miami, the band fine-tuned the instrumentation and the lyrics and recorded numerous complete takes. Five or six best ones were selected, and the best parts were then spliced together to create the released version. According to the producer Bill Szymczyk, there were 33 edits on the two‑inch master. The final section features a guitar battle between Joe Walsh (who had replaced Bernie Leadon after Leadon's departure from the band in 1975) with a Fender Telecaster and Felder with a Gibson Les Paul, which took the two of them sitting together working for around three days to achieve the necessary precision. Walsh and Felder initially started improvising but Henley insisted that the recording should follow the music as first recorded in Felder's demo. However, according to Szymczyk, Walsh and Felder's improvisations did make the final cut of the song, with the producer splicing different Walsh and Felder licks together while he, Walsh, and Felder arranged harmonized guitar parts together in the studio.

Henley decided that the song should be a single, although Felder had doubts and the record company was reluctant to release it because, at over six minutes, its duration far exceeded that of the songs generally played by radio stations. The band took a stand and refused the label's request to shorten the song. The song was released as the second single from the album after "New Kid in Town". The front cover art for some overseas editions of the 45rpm single released was a reworked version of the Hotel California LP cover art, which used a photograph of the Beverly Hills Hotel by David Alexander, with design and art direction by Kosh.

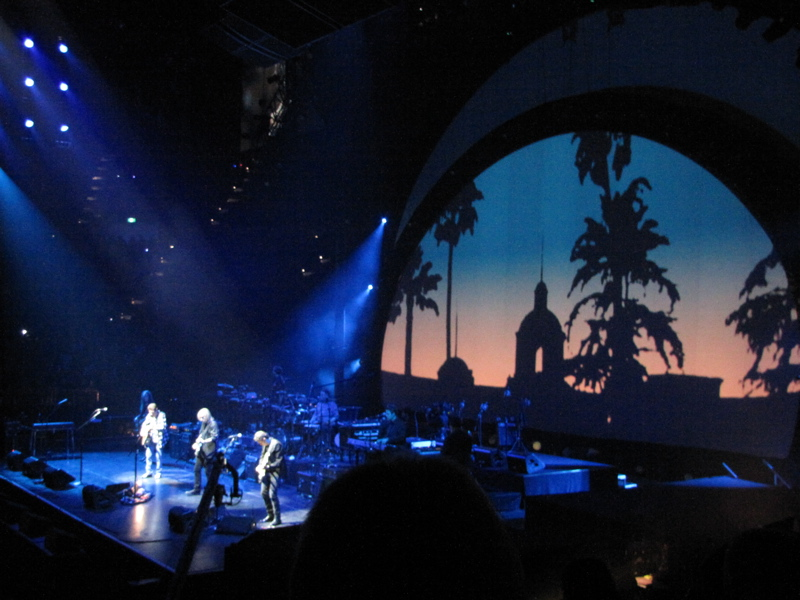
The Eagles performing "Hotel California" in Australia during their Long Road Out of Eden Tour

As "Hotel California" became one of the group's most popular songs and a concert staple for the band, live recordings of the song have therefore also been released. The first live recording of the song took place in October 1976, at the Los Angeles Forum. This recording appeared later on the extended version of the album. A 1980 recording was released in the Eagles Live album. An acoustic version with an extended intro is a track on the 1994 Hell Freezes Over reunion concert CD and video release. The Hell Freezes Over version is performed using eight guitars and has a decidedly Spanish sound, with Felder's flamenco-inspired arrangement and intro.

A music video for the song, filmed at the Capital Centre in March 1977, was first aired on the USA Network as part of the Night Flight program in August 1985. This video would continue to air on VH1. In 2013, a re-edited version of the video, as well as other footage from the Capital Centre concerts, was released as part of the History of the Eagles documentary set.

In 1998, at the induction of the Eagles into the Rock and Roll Hall of Fame, all seven members of the Eagles (Henley, Frey, Felder, Walsh, Leadon, Randy Meisner, and Timothy B. Schmit) appeared on stage together for the only time to perform "Hotel California".

=== Chart performance ===
"Hotel California" first entered the Billboard Hot 100 chart dated February 26, 1977, and topped the Hot 100 singles chart for one week in May 1977, the band's fourth song to reach No. 1 on that chart. It peaked at number 10 on the Easy Listening chart in April 1977. Billboard ranked it number 19 on its 1977 Pop Singles year-end chart. Three months after its first release, the single was certified Gold by the Recording Industry Association of America (RIAA), representing one million copies shipped. In 2009, the song was further certified Platinum (Digital Sales Award) by the RIAA for sales of one million digital downloads, and has since sold over 3 million downloads.

=== Accolades ===
The Eagles won the 1977 Grammy Award for Record of the Year for "Hotel California" at the 20th Grammy Awards in 1978. Cash Box said that "the luxuriant harmonies are here, of course, along with muted rhythm guitars and vocal inflections that add a West Indian flavor" and "the multi-tracked guitar harmonies ... end the cut with melodrama". In 2003, the song was inducted into the Grammy Hall of Fame.

The song is rated highly in many rock music lists and polls. Rolling Stone magazine ranked it number 49 on its list of "The 500 Greatest Songs of All Time" in 2004 and #311 in 2021. It was named one of The Rock and Roll Hall of Fame's 500 Songs that Shaped Rock and Roll. At the induction of the Eagles into the Rock and Roll Hall of Fame in 1998, all seven former and present members of the band reunited to perform "Hotel California" and "Take It Easy."

The song's guitar solo was voted the best solo of all time by readers of Guitarist magazine in 1998, and was ranked 8th on Guitar Magazine's Top 100 Guitar Solos. The song was also included in the music video game Guitar Hero World Tour. It was ranked number 1 in the list of the best 12-string guitar songs of all times by Guitar World magazine in 2015. In June 2026, CBS News included the song in its list of the 250 essential American songs of the past 250 years.

== Themes and interpretations ==
Glenn Frey said that originally "We decided to create something strange, just to see if we could do it," and that the song was meant to mimic the imagery of the 1965 novel The Magus by John Fowles, about a man in an unfamiliar rural setting who is unsure about what he is experiencing.

Don Henley has given a number of explanations about the song, ranging from "a journey from innocence to experience" to "a sociopolitical statement." In an interview with Rolling Stone, Henley said that the song was meant to be "more of a symbolic piece about America in general," and added, "Lyrically, the song deals with traditional or classical themes of conflict: darkness and light, good and evil, youth and age, the spiritual versus the secular. I guess you could say it's a song about loss of innocence."

The song has been described as being "all about American decadence and burnout, too much money, corruption, drugs and arrogance; too little humility and heart." It has also been interpreted as an allegory about hedonism, self-destruction, and greed in the music industry of the late 1970s. Henley called it "our interpretation of the high life in Los Angeles," and later said, "It's not really about California; it's about America. It's about the dark underbelly of the American dream. It's about excess, it's about narcissism. It's about the music business. ... It can have a million interpretations." In the 2013 documentary, History of the Eagles, Henley reiterated:

On just about every album we made, there was some kind of commentary on the music business, and on American culture in general. The hotel itself could be taken as a metaphor not only for the myth-making of Southern California, but for the myth-making that is the American Dream, because it is a fine line between the American Dream, and the American nightmare.

In a 2009 interview, The Plain Dealer music critic John Soeder asked Henley if he regretted writing the lines "So I called up the captain / 'Please bring me my wine' / He said, 'We haven't had that spirit here since 1969'" because wines are fermented while spirits are distilled. Henley responded:

Thanks for the tutorial and, no, you're not the first to bring this to my attention – and you're not the first to completely misinterpret the lyric and miss the metaphor. Believe me, I've consumed enough alcoholic beverages in my time to know how they are made and what the proper nomenclature is. But that line in the song has little or nothing to do with alcoholic beverages. It's a sociopolitical statement. My only regret would be having to explain it in detail to you, which would defeat the purpose of using literary devices in songwriting and lower the discussion to some silly and irrelevant argument about chemical processes.

In his Encyclopedia of Great Popular Song Recordings, Volume 1, Steve Sullivan theorizes that the "spirit" that the Hotel California hasn't had since 1969 refers to the spirit of social activism of the 1960s, and how disco and the related pop music of the mid-1970s had turned away from it.

=== Conjectures ===
The metaphorical character of the story related in the lyrics has inspired a number of conjectural interpretations by listeners. In the 1980s, the Rev. Paul Risley of Cornerstone Church in Burlington, Wisconsin, alleged that "Hotel California" referred to a San Francisco hotel that was purchased by Anton LaVey and converted into his Church of Satan. The song also allegedly contained backwards messages purportedly referring to Satanism: "Yes, Satan, he organized his own religion. ... It was delicious. ... He puts it in a vat and fixes it for his son and gives it away." Don Felder denied any such allegations in a 2019 interview, maintaining that the song was about "the underbelly industry in Los Angeles, how it can be less than beautiful." Other rumors suggested that the Hotel California mentioned in the song was actually the Camarillo State Mental Hospital, which was shut down in 1997, and redeveloped into California State University Channel Islands.

The first stanza ("warm smell of colitas, rising up through the air") has been interpreted as a sexual slang or as a reference to marijuana smoking. "Colitas" means "little tails" in Spanish; Within Mexican slang it refers to the flowering buds of the cannabis plant. According to Glenn Frey, the "warm smell" is "colitas ... it means little tails, the very top of the plant." The Eagles' manager Irving Azoff appears to lend support to the marijuana hypothesis; however, Felder said, "The colitas is a plant that grows in the desert that blooms at night, and it has this kind of pungent, almost funky smell. Don Henley came up with a lot of the lyrics for that song, and he came up with colitas."

Other interpretations of the song range from opioid dependence to human sacrifice and cannibalism. On the various interpretations, Henley said: "Some of the wilder interpretations of that song have been amazing. It was really about the excesses of American culture and certain girls we knew. But it was also about the uneasy balance between art and commerce."

Journalist James Campion and the Rock and Roll Hall of Fame have both argued a connection (and possible source of influence) to "Hotel California" with "Desperados Under the Eaves" by Warren Zevon which had been released on Zevon's self titled 1976 album (the year prior to "Hotel California"), featuring Glenn Frey and Don Henley as backup singers on other songs on the album. Campion notes both songs feature a similar setting in a Los Angeles hotel, describing "Hotel California" as "the ultimate Californian dirge for aging boomers who once swarmed to the coast in search of freedom, but ended up broken, drug-addled prisoners of a false dream, "desperados" peering from beneath the shadowy eaves."

== Harmonic structure ==
The intro and verses' chord pattern counts eight measures, each one assigned to a single chord. Seven different chords are used in the eight measures. As the song opens, it is not until the eighth measure that a chord is repeated. The song is initially in the key of B-minor. The presence of E major suggests a modality of B Dorian mode.

The chords are played as follows (F♯ can be played as F♯7):

Bm–F♯–A–E–G–D–Em–F♯

or

Assuming the key of D (the relative major of B minor):
vi–III–V–II–IV–I–ii–III

The eight-measure sequence is repeated in the intro, for each verse and in the outro, providing the harmonic framework for the entire extended dual guitar solo at the end of the song. One explanation of the progression is that it is a common flamenco chord progression called the "Spanish progression" (i–VII–VI–V in a Phrygian context) that is interspersed with consecutive fifths. With its descending ostinato pattern, it could be considered a fandango, a forerunner of the Baroque chaconne form.

This chord sequence is not commonly used, and Ian Anderson of Jethro Tull has pointed out its similarity to his song "We Used to Know" from their 1969 album Stand Up, an international hit which reached No. 1 in UK album chart and No. 20 in U.S. Billboard album chart, suggesting the Eagles heard it on the album or when they toured together. While the Eagles did open for Jethro Tull in June 1972, Don Felder, who wrote the music, did not join the band until 1974 and would not have been backstage at their concerts. Felder has said that he had never heard "We Used to Know", and that he was unfamiliar with Jethro Tull apart from the fact the frontman plays a flute. Anderson himself indicated that his comments on the similarities between the songs were meant as a joke, and said: "It's not plagiarism. It's just the same chord sequence. It's in a different time signature, different key, different context. ... Harmonic progression—it's almost a mathematical certainty that you're gonna crop up with the same thing sooner or later if you're strumming a few chords on a guitar."

The chorus, or refrain, uses five of the verse's seven chords, structured with the melody in a way that infers a key change from B minor to its relative major key of D.

G–D–F♯–Bm–G–D–Em–F♯
or
assuming a key of D:
IV–I–III–vi–IV–I–ii–III

== Notable cover versions ==
- The Orb, under the name of Jam on the Mutha, produced a version that charted at No. 62 in the UK in 1990.
- Gipsy Kings recorded a flamenco version sung in Spanish for the 1990 compilation album Rubáiyát: Elektra's 40th Anniversary, and the version was used as a theme tune for "the Jesus" in the Coen brothers film The Big Lebowski.
- Mike Piranha recorded the parody "Hotel Honolulu" in 1998, satirizing overdevelopment, crime, and other issues on Oahu; the song became a local hit in Hawaii.
- The Romanian band Vama Veche recorded its version with different lyrics entitled "Hotel Cișmigiu", sung in its native language.
- The Cat Empire recorded a version sung in French titled "L'Hôtel de Californie" for Triple J's Like a Version segment, and is included in its 2005 compilation album as well as the band's 2003 live album On the Attack.
- The Killers and Rhythms del Mundo collaborated on their version with Afro-Cuban music for the 2009 Artists' Project Earth charity, and it appeared on the album Rhythms del Mundo Classics.
- Frank Ocean released a song that samples the entire instrumental track of "Hotel California" on his mixtape Nostalgia, Ultra (2011), entitled "American Wedding." Don Henley threatened Ocean with a lawsuit for copyright infringement.
- Christina Aguilera performed the song during the eighth season of the American reality talent show The Voice, along with her team.
- Czech singer Victoria covered the song for her debut album This Is Me! (2006), and her version reached No. 1 on Czech radio Top 50 chart.

== Cultural influence ==
"Hotel California" and its lyrics have become absorbed into the wider culture around the world, and have been used by various writers and commentators to reflect on issues ranging from politics to social media and welfare, or as an observation on a particular situation. The lines "We are programmed to receive / You can check out any time you like / But you can never leave!" were used by an economist to refer to how the appeal of an attractive "Hotel California"-type host country to foreign investors may be countered by the cost of exit on leaving the country. A term "The Hotel California Effect" was then used to refer to the negative effect of financial regulations on investment, and the problems foreign investors faced when getting their money out of China. It has also applied to other ideas such as problems when leaving a service provider or social media network, or when exiting cloud computing. The same analogy has been used by various commentators considering scenarios for Brexit, with the term "Hotel California Brexit".

Although the Eagles were noted for their reluctance to license their songs for use in shows, the song has been used in a number of films and television shows, such as The Big Lebowski (performed by the Gipsy Kings), Absolutely Fabulous, American Horror Story (Hotel), The Sopranos, and the end credits of Shang-Chi and the Legend of the Ten Rings.

In 2023, Loudwire reported that the song's lyrics were among the most-searched in the rock genre from January 2019 through July 2023, according to an independent study of data pulled from Google Trends.

== Alleged theft of handwritten lyrics ==
On July 13, 2022, three individuals – rare-book dealer Glenn Horowitz and rock memorabilia specialists Craig Inciardi and Edward Kosinski – were charged after allegedly conspiring to sell Henley's handwritten lyrics to the song "Hotel California" and two other songs from the same album that the Manhattan District Attorney's office claims were improperly obtained. Prosecutors claim the lyrics could be worth over $1 million at auction. The three men pleaded not guilty and were released without bail pending trial. Eagles manager Irving Azoff said the case exposed "the truth about music memorabilia sales of highly personal, stolen items hidden behind a façade of legitimacy". In February 2024, Henley testified that he never gave the lyric sheets away and repeated his claim from 2012 that they were stolen from his barn in Malibu, California decades prior. Henley also acknowledged that he granted writer Ed Sanders, who in 1979 began working with The Eagles on a biography which was never published, some access to them, but stated that he never allowed Sanders to have permanent possession of them. Though Sanders was not among those charged, he was acknowledged to have sold 100 pages worth of Hotel California lyric sheets to Horowitz in 2005 after alleging to Horowitz that Henley's assistant sent him the documents. Eventually, Inciardi and Kosinski would begin auctioning them in 2012. Defense lawyers have claimed Henley legally gave Sanders the lyric sheets. On March 6, 2024, Assistant Manhattan District Attorney Aaron Ginandes abruptly dropped the criminal case against Horowitz, Inciardi and Kosinski midtrial, stating to the presiding judge that prosecutors believed that newly released emails backed defense arguments which questioned the trial's fairness.

== Personnel ==
Partial credits from Richard Buskin and Bill Szymczyk.

- Don Felder: 12-string acoustic guitar, 6-string electric guitar, backing vocals
- Don Henley: lead vocals, drums, percussion
- Glenn Frey: 12-string acoustic guitar, backing vocals
- Joe Walsh: electric guitar, organ, backing vocals
- Randy Meisner: bass, backing vocals

== Live performances ==
"Hotel California" has been performed at least 3,327 times by 347 different artists as of June 2026. This includes 1,233 performances of the song by Eagles, 359 by Don Felder solo, and 209 by Don Henley solo.

== Charts ==
=== Weekly charts ===
Weekly chart performance for "Hotel California"
Chart (1977)	Peak position
Australia (Kent Music Report)	60
Austria (Ö3 Austria Top 40)	13
Belgium (Ultratop 50 Flanders)	24
Canada Top Singles (RPM)	1
Canada Adult Contemporary (RPM)	2
France (SNEP)	2
Germany (GfK)	6
Japan (Oricon)	15
Netherlands (Dutch Top 40)	8
Netherlands (Single Top 100)	6
New Zealand (Recorded Music NZ)	5
Norway (VG-lista)	5
Spain (AFE)	3
Switzerland (Schweizer Hitparade)	2
UK Singles (Official Charts)	8
US Billboard Hot 100	1
US Adult Contemporary (Billboard)	10

Chart (2016)	Peak position
US Hot Rock & Alternative Songs (Billboard)	6

Chart (2020–2026)	Peak position
Global 200 (Billboard)	106
Israel International Airplay (Media Forest)	15
Portugal (AFP)	154

=== Year-end charts ===
Year-end chart performance for "Hotel California"
Chart (1977)	Position
Canada Top 200 singles (RPM)	8
Germany (Official German Charts)	20
Japan (Oricon)	41
Netherlands (Dutch Top 40)	57
Netherlands (Single Top 100)	52
New Zealand	30
US Billboard Hot 100	19

Chart (2012)	Position
France (SNEP)	198

Chart (2016)	Position
US Hot Rock Songs (Billboard)	59

Chart (2021)	Position
Global 200 (Billboard)	126

Chart (2022)	Position
Global 200 (Billboard)	132

== Certifications ==
Certifications and sales for "Hotel California"
Region	Certification	Certified units/sales
Denmark (IFPI Danmark)	2× Platinum	180,000^{‡}
France (SNEP)	Silver	250,000^{*}
Italy (FIMI) Digital download/sales since 2009	2× Platinum	100,000^{‡}
Japan 1976-1978 sales	—	350,000
Japan (RIAJ) 1996 release (physical sales)	Platinum	100,000^{^}
New Zealand (RMNZ)	12× Platinum	360,000^{‡}
Portugal (AFP)	4× Platinum	100,000^{‡}
Spain (Promusicae)	2× Platinum	120,000^{‡}
United Kingdom (BPI)	5× Platinum	3,000,000^{‡}
United States (RIAA) Physical single	Gold	1,000,000^{^}
United States (RIAA) Digital download	Platinum	3,000,000
^{*} Sales figures based on certification alone.^{^} Shipments figures based on certification alone.^{‡} Sales+streaming figures based on certification alone.
