= New Kid in Town =

- Spanish picture sleeve

Single by Eagles

from the album Hotel California
- B-side: "Victim of Love"
- Released: December 7, 1976
- Genre: Yacht rock; country rock
- Length: 5:04 (album version); 4:49 (single version)
- Label: Asylum
- Songwriters: Don Henley; Glenn Frey; JD Souther
- Producer: Bill Szymczyk

Eagles singles chronology
"Take It to the Limit" (1975)	"New Kid in Town" (1976)	"Hotel California" (1977)

"New Kid in Town" is a song by the Eagles from their fifth studio album Hotel California (1976). It was written by Don Henley, Glenn Frey and JD Souther. Released as the first single from the album, the song reached number one in the U.S. and number 20 in the UK. The single version has an earlier fade-out than the album version. Frey sings the lead vocals and plays acoustic guitar, with Henley providing the main harmony vocals and drums, Randy Meisner plays the guitarrón mexicano, which is a Mexican acoustic bass normally played in mariachi bands, Don Felder plays all the electric guitars, and Joe Walsh plays the electric piano and organ parts. The song won the Grammy Award for Best Vocal Arrangement for Two or More Voices.

== Background ==
JD Souther initially wrote the chorus for the song. According to Souther, the band thought it sounded like a hit, but he did not know what to do with it. About a year later, Souther, Frey and Henley gathered for the writing of Hotel California where Souther played the song for them, and the three finished the song.

Henley described the song as being "another hidden comment on the music business, disguised as a love song." Souther later said that the song came about as a result of their "fascination with gunfire as an analogy" and added that "at some point some kid would come riding into town that was much faster than you and he'd say so, and then he'd prove it." He said: "We were just writing about our replacements." Similarly, Henley discussed the song's meaning in the liner notes of The Very Best Of:

It's about the fleeting, fickle nature of love and romance. It's also about the fleeting nature of fame, especially in the music business. We were basically saying, 'Look, we know we're red hot right now but we also know that somebody's going to come along and replace us — both in music and in love.'

While the Eagles had become one of the most popular bands in the world at the time the song was recorded, the lyrics reflect their anxiety about being replaced by a more popular band. The lyrics also contain references to the phony friends they acquire when they are popular but who will forget them "when somebody new comes along." Sometimes the lyrics use a romantic relationship as a metaphor but this is not done consistently.

Eagles' biographer Marc Eliot stated that "New Kid in Town" captures "a precise and spectacular moment immediately familiar to any guy who's ever felt the pain, jealousy, insecurity, rage and heartbreak of the moment he discovers his girlfriend likes someone better and has moved on." He also suggests that it captures a more abstract theme of "the fickle nature of both the muse and the masses."

Former Los Angeles Kings player Gene Carr, a friend of Frey's, speculated that he was an inspiration for the song. It has also been suggested that Bernie Taupin was the inspiration for the song, a result of his party lifestyle while in Los Angeles during the 1970s.

On Henley's first solo album, I Can't Stand Still, he references the song by singing the line "there's a new kid in town" over the rideout of "Johnny Can't Read".

== Critical reception ==
Cash Box said that "Bill Szymczyk’s production brings out the delicacy of the vocal harmonies, and the lyric here is quite effective." Stereogum contributor Tom Breihan said "It’s a sad, dark, passive-aggressive song. It’s also really pretty...It’s just a self-pitying, discontented, beautifully realized sigh of a song." In 2016, the editors of Rolling Stone rated "New Kid in Town" as the fifth greatest Eagles song, describing it as "an exquisite piece of south-of-the-border melancholia" and praising its complex, "overlapping harmonies." These harmonies helped the song win the Grammy Award for Best Vocal Arrangement for Two or More Voices.

== Personnel ==
Credits from liner notes.

- Glenn Frey – lead vocals, acoustic rhythm guitar
- Joe Walsh – electric piano, organ, backing vocals
- Don Felder – lead guitars, backing vocals
- Randy Meisner – guitarrón, backing vocals
- Don Henley – drums, percussion, harmony and backing vocals

== Charts ==
=== Weekly charts ===
Chart (1976–1977)	Peak position
Australia KMR	16
Belgium (Ultratop 50 Flanders)	19
Canada Top Singles (RPM)	1
Canada Adult Contemporary (RPM)	2
Canada Country Singles (RPM)	12
Ireland (IRMA)	12
Netherlands (Dutch Top 40)	9
Netherlands (Single Top 100)	11
New Zealand (Recorded Music NZ)	6
Norway (VG-lista)	9
Spain (AFE)	8
UK Singles (Official Charts)	20
US Billboard Hot 100	1
US Adult Contemporary (Billboard)	2
US Hot Country Songs (Billboard)	43
US Cashbox Top 100	2
West Germany (GfK)	44

=== Year-end charts ===
Chart (1977)	Position
Canada Top Singles (RPM)	19
Netherlands (Dutch Top 40)	100
US Billboard Hot 100	59
US Adult Contemporary (Billboard)	23

== Certifications ==
Region	Certification	Certified units/sales
United Kingdom (BPI)	Silver	200,000^{‡}
^{‡} Sales+streaming figures based on certification alone.
