= In the Studio with Redbeard =

North American radio program

In the Studio with Redbeard is a North American radio program, produced and hosted by Dallas, Texas, based rock and roll disc jockey Doug "Redbeard" Hill.

The show is a weekly hour-long "rockumentary" interview with music program which looks at the making of many of the greatest albums recorded in rock and roll history, although sometimes it would spotlight the history of rock and roll bands. Redbeard interviews the musicians who created these albums, with interviewees including Deep Purple, Queen, The Beatles, David Bowie, Pink Floyd, Genesis, Rush, Eagles, The Who, Led Zeppelin and Peter Gabriel.

The show first went on the air nationally the week of June 26, 1988, initially broadcast by 60 rock stations including WXRK/92.3: New York, KLOS/95.5: Los Angeles, WLUP-FM/97.9: Chicago, WMMR/93.3: Philadelphia, KTXQ/102.1: Dallas, WHJY/94.1: Providence, WRIF/101.1: Detroit, KRQR: San Francisco, WKLS: Atlanta and distributed by The Album Network through 1999, which grew the network to 180 stations. "In the Studio" celebrated its 30th consecutive year in 2018, having passed the 1,200-show mark in June 2011, and is distributed by Beardedfisch Productions. Now has the episodes online at its website with or without the music.
