= Life in the Fast Lane =

- Spain cover release

Single by the Eagles

from the album Hotel California
- B-side: "The Last Resort"
- Released: May 3, 1977
- Recorded: 1976
- Genre: Rock
- Length: 4:46
- Label: Asylum
- Songwriters: Joe Walsh; Glenn Frey; Don Henley
- Producer: Bill Szymczyk

The Eagles singles chronology
"Hotel California" (1977)	"Life in the Fast Lane" (1977)	"Please Come Home for Christmas" (1978)

Audio
- "Life in the Fast Lane" on YouTube

"Life in the Fast Lane" is a song written by Joe Walsh, Glenn Frey and Don Henley, and recorded by American rock band the Eagles for their fifth studio album Hotel California (1976). It was the third single released from this album, and peaked at No. 11 on the Billboard Hot 100.

== Content ==
The song tells the story of a couple who take their excessive lifestyle to the edge. On In the Studio with Redbeard, Glenn Frey revealed that the title came to him one day when he was riding on the freeway with a drug dealer known as "The Count". Frey asked the dealer to slow down and the response was, "What do you mean? It's life in the fast lane!" In that same interview, Frey indicated that the song's central riff was played by Walsh while the band was warming up in rehearsals and Walsh was told to "keep that; it's a song". Don Henley recalled that the "song actually sprang from the opening guitar riff. One day, at rehearsal, Joe [Walsh] just busted out that crazy riff and I said 'What the hell is that? We've got to figure out to make a song out of that." Henley and Frey, the primary lyricists for the band, then wrote the lyrics for the song.

== Critical reception ==
Cashbox said that "with the influence of six-stringer Joe Walsh, the Eagles are harder and funkier than ever here." Record World said that it's "the album's most hard-edged rocker, dominated by a Walsh-signature guitar line." In 2016, the editors of Rolling Stone rated "Life in the Fast Lane" as the Eagles' eighth-greatest song. In 2017, Billboard ranked the song number four on their list of the 15 greatest Eagles songs, and in 2019, Rolling Stone ranked the song number eight on their list of the 40 greatest Eagles songs.

== Personnel ==
Partial credits from liner notes.

- Don Henley – lead vocals, drums
- Glenn Frey – backing vocals, clavinet
- Joe Walsh – lead guitar, rhythm guitar
- Don Felder – lead guitar, rhythm guitar
- Randy Meisner – backing vocals, bass

== Cover versions ==
In 2007, Swedish country and pop singer Jill Johnson recorded the song on her tenth studio album Music Row.

The song was used as the soundtrack for the roller coaster Eagles' Life in the Fast Lane, which opened at Hard Rock Park in May 2008.

On July 25, 2019 the rock band Hinder released their cover version of the song as a non-album single.

== Charts ==
Chart (1977)	Peak position
Canada Top Singles (RPM)	12
ERROR in "Canadaadultcontemporary": Unknown chart "Canadaadultcontemporary".
US Billboard Hot 100	11

== Certifications ==
Region	Certification	Certified units/sales
United Kingdom (BPI)	Silver	200,000^{‡}
^{‡} Sales+streaming figures based on certification alone.
