= Hotel California (album) =

Studio album by Eagles
- Released: December 8, 1976
- Recorded: March – October 1976
- Studios: Criteria, Miami; Record Plant, Los Angeles
- Genre: Rock
- Length: 43:28
- Label: Asylum
- Producer: Bill Szymczyk

Eagles chronology
Their Greatest Hits (1971–1975) (1976)	Hotel California (1976)	The Long Run (1979)

Singles from Hotel California
- 1. "New Kid in Town" Released: December 7, 1976; 2. "Hotel California" Released: February 22, 1977; 3. "Life in the Fast Lane" Released: May 3, 1977

Hotel California is the fifth studio album by the American rock band the Eagles, released on December 8, 1976, by Asylum Records. Recorded by the band and produced by Bill Szymczyk at the Criteria and Record Plant studios between March and October 1976, it was the band's first album with guitarist Joe Walsh, who had replaced founding member Bernie Leadon, and the last to feature founding bassist/vocalist Randy Meisner. The album cover is a photograph of the Beverly Hills Hotel, taken by David Alexander.

Hotel California was an immediate critical and commercial success, topping the US Billboard 200 chart. At the 20th Grammy Awards, the title track won Record of the Year, and "New Kid in Town" won Best Arrangement for Voices. The album was also nominated for Album of the Year but lost to Fleetwood Mac's Rumours (1977). Three singles were released from the album, with the title track and "New Kid in Town" topping the Billboard Hot 100 and "Life in the Fast Lane" reaching No. 11.

Hotel California is one of the best-selling albums of all time. It has been certified 28× Platinum by the Recording Industry Association of America (RIAA) in the US, and has sold over 42 million units worldwide, making it the band's second best-selling album after Their Greatest Hits (1971–1975) (1976). Ranked by various publications as one of the greatest albums of all time, it was placed at number 37 on Rolling Stone's list of the "500 Greatest Albums of All Time" in 2003 and 2012, re-positioned to number 118 in the 2020 edition. A 40th anniversary special edition of Hotel California was released in November 2017. The band played the album in its entirety during the Hotel California 2020 Tour.

== Theme ==
The first song written for the album was the title track, which became the theme for the album. Don Henley said of the themes of the songs in the album:

They're the same themes that run through all of our work: loss of innocence, the cost of naiveté, the perils of fame, of excess; exploration of the dark underbelly of the American dream, idealism realized and idealism thwarted, illusion versus reality, the difficulties of balancing loving relationships and work, trying to square the conflicting relationship between business and art; the corruption in politics, the fading away of the Sixties dream of "peace, love and understanding."

On the title "Hotel California", Henley said that "the word, 'California,' carries with it all kinds of connotations, powerful imagery, mystique, etc., that fires the imaginations of people in all corners of the globe. There's a built-in mythology that comes with that word, an American cultural mythology that has been created by both the film and the music industry." In an interview with ZigZag shortly before the album's release, Henley said:

This is a concept album, there's no way to hide it, but it's not set in the old West, the cowboy thing, you know. It's more urban this time (…) It's our bicentennial year, you know, the country is 200 years old, so we figured since we are the Eagles and the Eagle is our national symbol, that we were obliged to make some kind of a little bicentennial statement using California as a microcosm of the whole United States, or the whole world, if you will, and to try to wake people up and say "We've been okay so far, for 200 years, but we're gonna have to change if we're gonna continue to be around."

== Composition ==
The band started writing and recording for the album in March 1976. Bernie Leadon, who was the principal country influence in the band, left the band after the release of the previous album, One of These Nights (1975). For Hotel California, the band made a conscious decision to move away from country rock, and wrote some songs with a more straightforward rock and roll sound, such as "Victim of Love" and "Life in the Fast Lane". Leadon was replaced by Joe Walsh who provided the opening guitar riff of "Life in the Fast Lane" that was then developed into the song. The title for "Life in the Fast Lane" was inspired by a conversation between Frey and his drug dealer during a high speed car ride. Walsh also contributed "Pretty Maids All in a Row", which is only one of two songs not written with Glenn Frey and Don Henley, the other being "Try and Love Again" which was written entirely by Randy Meisner. The song is about a relationship that is nearing its end, but can also be interpreted as the approaching end of Meisner's time with the band.

The chord progression and basic melody of the title track, "Hotel California", was written by Don Felder. Don Henley wrote most of the lyrics, with contributions from Glenn Frey. Henley noted that the hotel had become a "literal and symbolic focal point of their lives at that time", and it became the theme of the song. Frey wanted the song to be "more cinematic", and to write it "just like it was a movie". Henley sought inspiration for the lyrics by driving out into the desert, as well as from films and theatre. Parts of the lyrics of "Hotel California" as well as the song "Wasted Time" were based on Henley's break up with his then girlfriend Loree Rodkin.

Frey, in the "Hotel California" episode of In the Studio with Redbeard, spoke about the writing of "The Last Resort". Frey said: "It was the first time that Don took it upon himself to write an epic story and we were already starting to worry about the environment… we're constantly screwing up paradise and that was the point of the song and that at some point there is going to be no more new frontiers. I mean we're putting junk, er, garbage into space now."

The music for "Victim of Love" was an instrumental recording by Felder initially titled "Iron Lung" because it reminded him of the wheeziness of a childhood illness. Henley came up with the final title for the song when he, Frey, Felder, and JD Souther were discussing relationship breakups, and Souther likened a broken heart to being involved in a car crash. "New Kid in Town" originated as a chorus written by Souther, and the song was finished together with Frey and Henley.

== Recording ==
The album was recorded between March and October 1976 at Criteria Studios in Miami and Record Plant Studios in Los Angeles, and produced by Bill Szymczyk. Although the band favored Los Angeles, the producer Szymczyk wanted to record in Miami as he had developed a fear of living on a fault line in Los Angeles after experiencing an earthquake, and a compromise was then struck to split the recording between both places. While the band were recording the album, Black Sabbath were recording Technical Ecstasy in an adjacent studio at Criteria Studios. The band was forced to stop recording on numerous occasions because Black Sabbath were too loud and the sound was coming through the wall. The last track of the album, "The Last Resort", had to be re-recorded a number of times due to noise from the next studio.

For the title track "Hotel California", after the arrangement and instrumentation had been refined, several complete takes were recorded. The best parts were then spliced together, in all 33 edits on the two‑inch master, to create the final version. In contrast, "Victim of Love" was recorded in a single live session in studio apart from the lead vocal and the harmony on the choruses which were added later. Don Felder initially sang the lead vocals in the many early takes for the song, but the band felt that his efforts were not up to the required standard, and Henley then took over as the lead. Producer Szymczyk claims that the basic tracks for the entire album were recorded in complete takes, but he does not describe how individual songs were recorded (other than the aforementioned "Hotel California" and "Victim of Love").

According to Henley in a 1982 interview, the Eagles "probably peaked on Hotel California". Henley said: "After that, we started growing apart as collaborators and as friends."

== Artwork ==
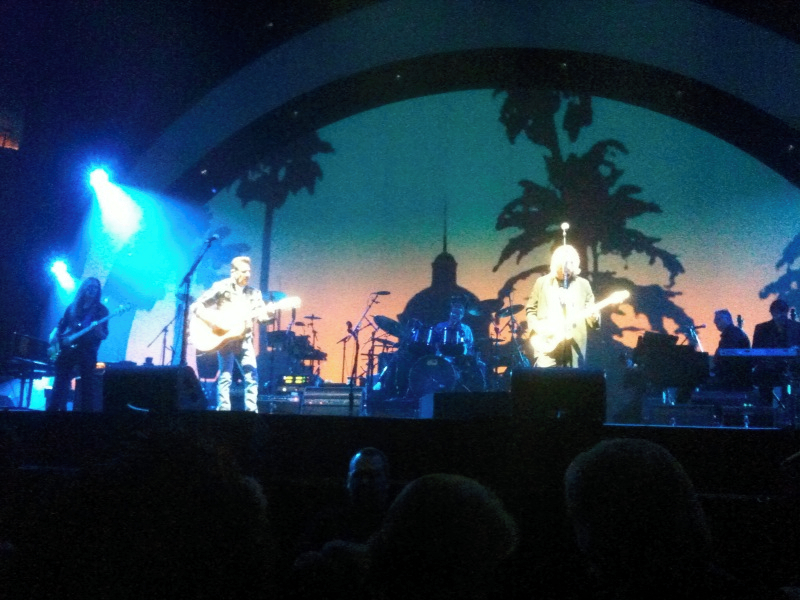
Eagles performing "Hotel California" in 2010 with the image from the album cover in the background

The front cover artwork is a photograph of The Beverly Hills Hotel shot just before sunset by David Alexander with design and art direction by Kosh. According to Kosh, Henley wanted him to find a place that can portray the Hotel California of the album title, and "portray it with a slightly sinister edge". Three hotels were photographed, and the one with The Beverly Hills Hotel was selected as the cover. Both the photographer and Kosh shot the image 60 feet above Sunset Boulevard on top of a cherry picker. As the image was taken from an unfamiliar vantage point in fading light, most people did not initially recognize the hotel. However, when the identity of Beverly Hills Hotel was revealed, the hotel threatened legal action over the use of the image.

The rear album cover was shot in the lobby of the Lido Hotel in Hollywood. The gatefold image shows the same lobby but filled with members of the band and their friends. Henley said: "I wanted a collection of people from all walks of life, It’s people on the edge, on the fringes of society." A shadowy figure appears on the balcony above the lobby, which led to speculations over the person's identity.

Kosh designed a Hotel California logo as a neon sign which was used on the album cover and in its promotional materials. As it proved difficult to bend real neon tubings into the desired shape of the script, the neon effect of the logo was achieved with airbrush by Bob Hickson. Additional portraits of the band used in the album package and promotional materials were shot by Norman Seeff.

== Release ==
The album was released by Asylum Records on December 8, 1976, in vinyl, cassette and 8-track cartridge formats. It was considered for quadraphonic release in early 1977, but this idea was dropped following the demise of the quadraphonic format. On the album's 25th anniversary in 2001, it was released in a Multichannel 5.1 DVD-Audio disc. On August 17, 2011, the album was released on a hybrid SACD in Japan in The Warner Premium Sound series, containing both a stereo and a 5.1 mix.

Original vinyl pressings of Hotel California (Elektra/Asylum catalog no. 7E-1084) had custom picture labels of a blue Hotel California logo with a yellow background. These also had text engraved in the run-out groove of each side, continuing an in-joke trend the band had started with their third album On the Border. The text reads: Side one: "Is It 6 O'Clock Yet?"; Side two: "V.O.L. Is Five-Piece Live", indicating that the song "Victim of Love" was recorded in a live session in studio, with no overdubbing. Joe Walsh and Glenn Frey confirm this on the inner booklet of The Very Best Of. This only referred to the instrumental track, however; the lead vocal and harmony for the chorus were added later. This was in response to those who criticized the Eagles' practice of copious overdubbing of instruments and that they were too clinical and soulless in the studio. They wanted to demonstrate that they could play together without overdubs if they wanted to.

A 40th anniversary deluxe edition was released on November 24, 2017. The set includes the original remastered album, and a second CD that features 10 live tracks from the concert at The Forum, recorded in October 1976 two months before the original release of the album. This bonus CD was also issued as a stand-alone vinyl LP in 2021.

== Critical reception ==
Professional ratings
Review scores
Source	Rating
AllMusic	5/5 stars
American Songwriter	5/5 stars
Christgau's Record Guide	B
Classic Rock	3.5/5 stars
Encyclopedia of Popular Music	4/5 stars
The Great Rock Discography	10/10
Music Hound	5/5
Record Collector	5/5 stars
Record Mirror	4/5 stars
The Rolling Stone Album Guide	4/5 stars

Hotel California was met with widespread critical acclaim. Village Voice critic Robert Christgau felt it was their "most substantial if not their most enjoyable LP", while Charley Walters of Rolling Stone felt it showcased "both the best and worst tendencies of Los Angeles-situated rock". Both critics picked up on the album's California themes – Christgau remarking that while it may in places be "pretentious and condescending" and that "Don Henley is incapable of conveying a mental state as complex as self-criticism", the band couldn't have written the songs on side one "without caring about their California theme down deep"; Walters in contrast felt the "lyrics present a convincing and unflattering portrait of the milieu itself", and that Don Henley's vocals express well "the weary disgust of a victim (or observer) of the region's luxurious excess".

Billboard gave the album high praise: "The casually beautiful, quietly-intense multileveled vocal harmonies and brilliant original songs that meld solid emotional words with lovely melody lines are all back in force, keeping the Eagles at the acme of acoustic electric soft rock." It noted that, even though the album did not try out any new departure other than the "Procol Harum-type" title track, "the album proves that there's a lot more left to explore profitably and artistically in the L.A. countryish-rock style." Record World called the album "lush, even-tempered" and "smoothly controlled throughout".

Retrospective reviews have also been positive. Robert Hilburn of the Los Angeles Times, writing after the band broke up, called the album "a legitimate rock masterpiece", in which the band "examined their recurring theme about the American Dream with more precision, power and daring than ever in such stark, uncompromising songs as "Hotel California" and "The Last Resort"." William Ruhlmann from AllMusic later said "Hotel California unveiled what seemed almost like a whole new band. It was a band that could be bombastic, but also one that made music worthy of the later tag of 'classic rock', music appropriate for the arenas and stadiums the band was playing." Steve Holtje, writing for CultureCatch in 2012, felt that even though "an awful lot of the album is snarky whining from co-leaders Don Henley and Glenn Frey, two guys who didn't really seem like they had that much they could legitimately complain about", in the final analysis "Hotel California and the underrated concept album Desperado stand as the group's greatest statements".

Ultimate Classic Rock critic Sterling Whitaker rated both "Wasted Time" and "The Last Resort" as being among the Eagles' 10 most underrated songs.

== Accolades ==
Hotel California was the Eagles' sixth album (including Their Greatest Hits (1971–1975)), and fifth of original material. It became a critical and commercial success. In a poll of rock critics and DJs in 1987, it was ranked 48 out of 100. In a public poll for the 1994 edition of All Time Top 1000 Albums, it was voted number 107, and then number 67 in the 2000 edition. In 2001, the TV network VH1 placed Hotel California at number 38 on their 100 Greatest Albums of All Time list. Hotel California was ranked 13th in a 2005 survey held by British television's Channel 4 to determine the 100 greatest albums of all time. In 2003, the album was ranked number 37 on Rolling Stone magazine's list of the 500 greatest albums of all time, maintaining the rating in a 2012 revised list, and dropping to number 118 in the 2020 reboot of the list. The album also was placed at the 99th spot on Apple Music's 100 Best Albums list in 2024.

The song "Hotel California" was ranked number 49 on Rolling Stone's list of "The 500 Greatest Songs of All Time" in 2004. It maintained the ranking in 2010, and was re-ranked at number 311 in 2021.

=== Awards and nominations ===
The album and its tracks were nominated for five Grammy awards in 1978, winning two; Record of the Year for the title track and Best Arrangement for Voices for "New Kid in Town". However, the band's manager Irving Azoff refused requests by the ceremony's producer for the band to attend or perform at the ceremony unless a win was guaranteed. The band therefore did not appear at the ceremony to collect their awards. Henley later said: "The whole idea of a contest to see who is 'best' just doesn't appeal to us."

Year	Award	Nominee	Category	Result
1978	Grammy	Eagles for "Hotel California"	Record of the Year	Won
1978	Grammy	Eagles for "New Kid in Town"	Best Arrangement For Voices	Won
1978	Grammy	Eagles for Hotel California	Best Pop Vocal Performance by a Group	Nominated
1978	Grammy	Eagles for Hotel California	Album of the Year	Nominated
1978	Grammy	Bill Szymczyk	Producer of the Year	Nominated

== Commercial performance ==
The album first entered the US Billboard 200 at number four, reaching number one in its fourth week in January 1977. It topped the chart for eight weeks (non-consecutively), and it was certified platinum by the Recording Industry Association of America (RIAA) in a week of release. In its first year of release it sold nearly 6 million copies in the United States, and by July 1978 it has sold 9.5 million copies worldwide (7 million in the US and 2.5 million elsewhere internationally). On March 20, 2001, the album was certified 16× platinum by the Recording Industry Association of America, denoting shipment of 16 million in the United States, and had sold over 17 million copies in the US by 2013. Worldwide the album has sold over 42 million units. On January 22, 2026, the album was certified 28× platinum by the RIAA for 28 million units consumed in the United States under the new system that tallies album and digital track sales as well as streams.

The album produced two number one hit singles on the US Billboard Hot 100: "New Kid in Town", on February 26, 1977, and "Hotel California" on May 7, 1977.

== Track listing ==
=== Original release ===
Side one
No.	Title	Writer(s)	Lead vocals	Length
1.	"Hotel California"	Don Felder; Don Henley; Glenn Frey	Henley	6:30
2.	"New Kid in Town"	Henley; Frey; JD Souther	Frey	5:04
3.	"Life in the Fast Lane"	Henley; Frey; Joe Walsh	Henley	4:46
4.	"Wasted Time"	Henley; Frey	Henley	4:55

Side two
No.	Title	Writer(s)	Lead vocals	Length
1.	"Wasted Time" (Reprise)	Henley; Frey; Jim Ed Norman	instrumental	1:22
2.	"Victim of Love"	Felder; Henley; Frey; Souther	Henley	4:11
3.	"Pretty Maids All in a Row"	Walsh; Joe Vitale	Walsh	4:05
4.	"Try and Love Again"	Randy Meisner	Meisner	5:10
5.	"The Last Resort"	Henley; Frey	Henley	7:25

=== 40th anniversary edition bonus disc ===
Live at the LA Forum October 20–22, 1976
No.	Title	Writer(s)	Lead vocals	Length
1.	"Take It Easy"	Frey; Jackson Browne	Frey	4:48
2.	"Take It to the Limit"	Henley; Frey; Meisner	Meisner	5:19
3.	"New Kid in Town"	Henley; Frey; Souther	Frey	4:53
4.	"James Dean"	Henley; Frey; Souther; Browne	Frey	3:50
5.	"Good Day in Hell"	Henley; Frey	Frey and Henley	5:29
6.	"Witchy Woman"	Henley; Bernie Leadon	Henley	4:21
7.	"Funk 49"	Walsh; Dale Peters; Jim Fox	Walsh	4:04
8.	"One of These Nights"	Henley; Frey	Henley	3:53
9.	"Hotel California"	Felder; Henley; Frey	Henley	6:50
10.	"Already Gone"	Jack Tempchin; Robb Strandlund	Frey	5:16

== Personnel ==
Taken from album liner notes.

Eagles

- Don Henley – vocals, drums, percussion, synthesizer on “The Last Resort”
- Glenn Frey – vocals, guitars, keyboards, piano, clavinet, synthesizer
- Don Felder – vocals, guitars, pedal steel guitar on “The Last Resort”
- Joe Walsh – vocals, guitars, slide guitar, keyboards, piano, organ, synthesizer
- Randy Meisner – vocals, bass, guitarrón on “New Kid in Town”

Production

- Bill Szymczyk – producer, engineer, mixing
- Allan Blazek, Bruce Hensal, Ed Mashal– engineers
- Jim Ed Norman – string arrangements, conductor
- Sid Sharp – concert master
- Don Henley, John Kosh – art direction
- John Kosh – design
- David Alexander – photography
- Kosh – artwork
- Norman Seeff – poster design
- Ted Jensen – mastering and remastering
- Lee Hulko – original LP mastering

== Allegedly stolen lyric sheets ==
In July 2022, three men, all involved in rare book and memorabilia dealing, were indicted by a Manhattan, New York City, grand jury on felony charges of conspiracy and possession of stolen property; one was further charged with hindering prosecution. Prosecutors alleged that they had forged provenance documents attempting to demonstrate that they were the lawful owners of some of Frey and Henley's original drafts of lyrics for songs on the album, including "Hotel California" and "Life in the Fast Lane" and "New Kid in Town", when they in fact knew those materials, around a hundred handwritten pages on yellow notebook paper estimated to be worth $1 million in total, to have been stolen. Their plot had come to light after, having sold Henley some of the documents for $8,500 in 2012, they returned to Henley offering to sell him some more after listing them at Sotheby's four years later; he then filed a complaint with the New York County district attorney's office. All three protested their innocence through their attorneys.

The three were alleged to have acquired the documents from Ed Sanders, a journalist who had been hired to write a biography of the band around the time of Hotel California. Sanders did not finish the work until after the band had broken up and the project was eventually canceled. He is not charged or named in the indictment, but in a news release announcing it, the D.A.'s office described the papers as "originally stolen in the late 1970s by an author who had been hired to write a biography of the band." The indictment also quotes an "Individual 1" as telling one of the indicted men in an email that he "was staying at Henley's place in Malibu and had total access to his boxes of stuff, and there was a lot, and I compiled a box of files I wanted and his assistant mailed them to me." The Los Angeles Times found also that an archived version of the 2016 Sotheby's listing online identified Sanders as the then-owner.

== Charts ==
=== Weekly charts ===
Weekly chart performance for Hotel California by Eagles
Chart (1976–1978)	Peak position
Australia (Kent Music Report)	1
Austrian Albums (Ö3 Austria)	9
Canada Top Albums/CDs (RPM)	1
Dutch Albums (Album Top 100)	1
Finnish Albums (The Official Finnish Charts)	2
French Albums (SNEP)	2
German Albums (Offizielle Top 100)	3
Italian Albums (Musica e Dischi)	12
Japanese Album (Oricon)	2
New Zealand Albums (RMNZ)	1
Norwegian Albums (VG-lista)	1
Spanish Albums (AFYVE)	1
Swedish Albums (Sverigetopplistan)	3
UK Albums (Official Charts)	2
US Billboard 200	1

Chart (2015–2023)	Peak position
Belgian Albums (Ultratop Flanders)	98
Belgian Albums (Ultratop Wallonia)	130
Canadian Albums (Billboard)	89
French Albums (SNEP)	135
Japanese Albums (Oricon)	19
Portuguese Albums (AFP)	41
Scottish Albums (Official Charts)	38
Spanish Albums (Promusicae)	51
Swiss Albums (Schweizer Hitparade)	99
US Top Country Albums (Billboard)	5
US Top Rock Albums (Billboard)	2

=== Year-end charts ===
Year-end chart performance for Hotel California by Eagles
Chart (1976)	Position
Australian Albums (Kent Music Report)	59

Chart (1977)	Position
Australian Albums (Kent Music Report)	4
Austrian Albums (Ö3 Austria)	12
Canada Top Albums/CDs (RPM)	2
Dutch Albums (Album Top 100)	1
French Albums (SNEP)	5
German Albums (Offizielle Top 100)	7
Japanese Albums (Oricon)	2
New Zealand Albums (RMNZ)	2
UK Albums (OCC)	6
US Billboard 200	4
US Top Country Albums (Billboard)	33

Chart (1978)	Position
Dutch Albums (Album Top 100)	76
New Zealand Albums (RMNZ)	43

Chart (2002)	Position
Canadian Albums (Nielsen SoundScan)	107

Chart (2018)	Position
US Top Country Albums (Billboard)	43
US Top Rock Albums (Billboard)	70

Chart (2019)	Position
US Top Country Albums (Billboard)	35
US Top Rock Albums (Billboard)	81

Chart (2020)	Position
US Top Country Albums (Billboard)	27
US Top Rock Albums (Billboard)	43

Chart (2021)	Position
US Billboard 200	153
US Top Country Albums (Billboard)	13
US Top Rock Albums (Billboard)	27

Chart (2023)	Position
US Top Country Albums (Billboard)	40

Chart (2024)	Position
US Top Country Albums (Billboard)	75

== Certifications and sales ==
Region	Certification	Certified units/sales
Australia (ARIA)	9× Platinum	630,000^{^}
Austria (IFPI Austria)	Gold	25,000^{*}
Belgium (BRMA)	Gold	25,000^{*}
Canada (Music Canada)	Diamond	1,000,000^{^}
Denmark (IFPI Danmark)	Platinum	20,000^{‡}
Finland (Musiikkituottajat)	Gold	30,933
France (SNEP)	Diamond	1,000,000^{*}
Germany (BVMI)	Platinum	500,000^{^}
Hong Kong (IFPI Hong Kong)	Platinum	20,000^{*}
Italy (FIMI) 1976 release	Gold	100,000
Italy (FIMI) sales since 2009	Platinum	50,000^{‡}
Japan (Oricon Charts)	—	493,000
Malaysia	Gold	20,000
Mexico (AMPROFON)	Gold	35,000
Netherlands (NVPI)	Platinum	800,000
New Zealand (RMNZ)	Platinum	15,000^{^}
Norway	—	120,000
Singapore (RIAS)	Gold	20,000
Spain (Promusicae)	4× Platinum	400,000^{^}
Sweden	—	100,000
Switzerland (IFPI Switzerland) Elektra/WEA/MV edition	2× Platinum	100,000^{^}
Switzerland (IFPI Switzerland) Elektra/Warner edition	2× Platinum	100,000^{^}
United Kingdom (BPI)	6× Platinum	1,800,000^{^}
United States (RIAA)	28× Platinum	28,000,000^{‡}
Summaries
Worldwide	—	42,000,000
^{*} Sales figures based on certification alone.^{^} Shipments figures based on certification alone.^{‡} Sales+streaming figures based on certification alone.

== See also ==
- List of best-selling albums
- List of best-selling albums in the United States
- List of diamond-certified albums in Canada
- List of best-selling albums in the Netherlands
- List of Billboard 200 number-one albums of 1977
