= Blow =

Blow commonly refers to:

- Cocaine
- Exhalation
- Strike (attack)

Blow, Blew, Blowing, or Blown may also refer to:

== People ==
- Blew (surname)
- Blow (surname)

== Arts and entertainment ==
=== Music ===
- The Blow, an American electro-pop band

==== Albums ====
- Blow (Foetus album), 2001
- Blow (Ghinzu album) or the title song, 2004
- Blow (Heather Nova album), 1993
- Blow (Messy Marv and Berner album), 2009
  - Blow: Blocks and Boat Docks or the title song, by Messy Marv and Berner, 2010
- Blow (Red Lorry Yellow Lorry album) or the title song, 1989
- Blow (Straitjacket Fits album), 1993
- Blow It! (Steve Took's Horns album), 2004

==== Songs ====
- "Blew", by Nirvana, 1989
- "Blow" (Beyoncé song), 2013
- "Blow" (Ed Sheeran, Chris Stapleton and Bruno Mars song), 2019
- "Blow" (Kesha song), 2011
- "Blow" (Martin Solveig song), 2014
- "Blow" (Moneybagg Yo song), 2022
- "B.L.O.W.", by Tory Lanez, 2015
- "Blow", by Ashnikko, 2018
- "Blow", by Atreyu from Lead Sails Paper Anchor, 2007
- "Blow", by Blossoms from their self-titled album, 2014
- "Blow", by the Prom Kings from The Prom Kings, 2005
- "Blow", by Rick Ross from Port of Miami, 2006
- "Blow", by Theory of a Deadman from Savages, 2014
- "Blow", by Tyler, the Creator from Bastard, 2009
- "Da Blow", by Lil Jon from Crunk Juice, 2004
- "Blown", by DNCE from DNCE, 2016

=== Other media ===
- Blow (film), a 2001 American crime film directed by Ted Demme and starring Johnny Depp and Penélope Cruz
- "Blow" (My Name Is Earl), a television episode
- Blown, a novel by Philip José Farmer, sequel to Image of the Beast

== Other uses ==
- Blow (drink), a brand of energy drink
- Blow, to play a wind instrument
- Blow job, a type of oral sex
- Blowing or insufflation, a method of ingesting cocaine
- Blown save, a baseball term

== See also ==
- Bloo, a character in Foster's Home for Imaginary Friends
- Blow by Blow, a 1975 album by Jeff Beck
- Blow Job (disambiguation)
- Blow off (disambiguation)
- Blowback (disambiguation)
- Blow up (disambiguation)
- Blowout (disambiguation)
