= Gunshot residue =

Particles expelled from the muzzle of a gun

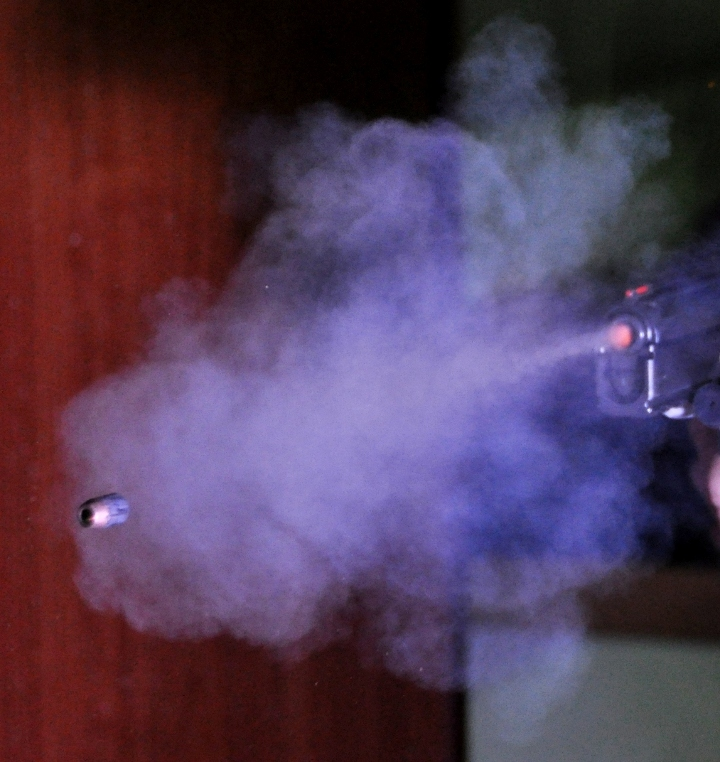
Gunshot residue from a pistol shot

Gunshot residue (GSR), also known as cartridge discharge residue (CDR), gunfire residue (GFR), or firearm discharge residue (FDR), consists of all of the particles that are expelled from the muzzle of a gun following the discharge of a bullet. It is principally composed of burnt and unburnt particles from the explosive primer, the propellant (gunpowder), stabilisers and other additives. The act of firing a bullet incites a highly pressurised, explosive reaction that is contained within the barrel of the firearm, which expels the bullet. This can cause the bullet, the barrel, or the cartridge to become damaged, meaning gunshot residue may also include metallic particles from the cartridge casing, the bullet jacket, as well as any other dirt or residue contained within the barrel that could have become dislodged.

Law enforcement commonly use swabbing, adhesives and vacuums with very fine filters to collect GSR. They commonly swab the web of the non-firing hand to look for gunshot residue if they are suspected to have discharged a firearm themselves or were in close contact with one at the time of discharge. Hair and clothing also accumulate GSR; typically a double-sided adhesive is used to sample areas that may have been exposed to such residue. It is also possible to use a swab moistened with 5% nitric acid for collection.

To determine if GSR is present in an area, presumptive tests, such as the modified Griess test and the sodium rhodizonate test, are performed. Any presumptive GSR samples are collected for confirmatory testing using instruments such as Scanning electron microscopy dispersive X-ray spectrometry (SEM-EDX) Flame or Graphite Furnace Atomic Absorption Spectrometry. There are both inorganic and organic components in GSR. Organic GSR (OGSR) consists of organic compounds such as nitroglycerine. Organic compounds can originate from the primer, propellants, lubricants or other additives used by manufacturers. Analysis of OGSR is not done with the same instrumentation as stated above, instead techniques like Gas Chromatography-Mass Spectrometry are used.

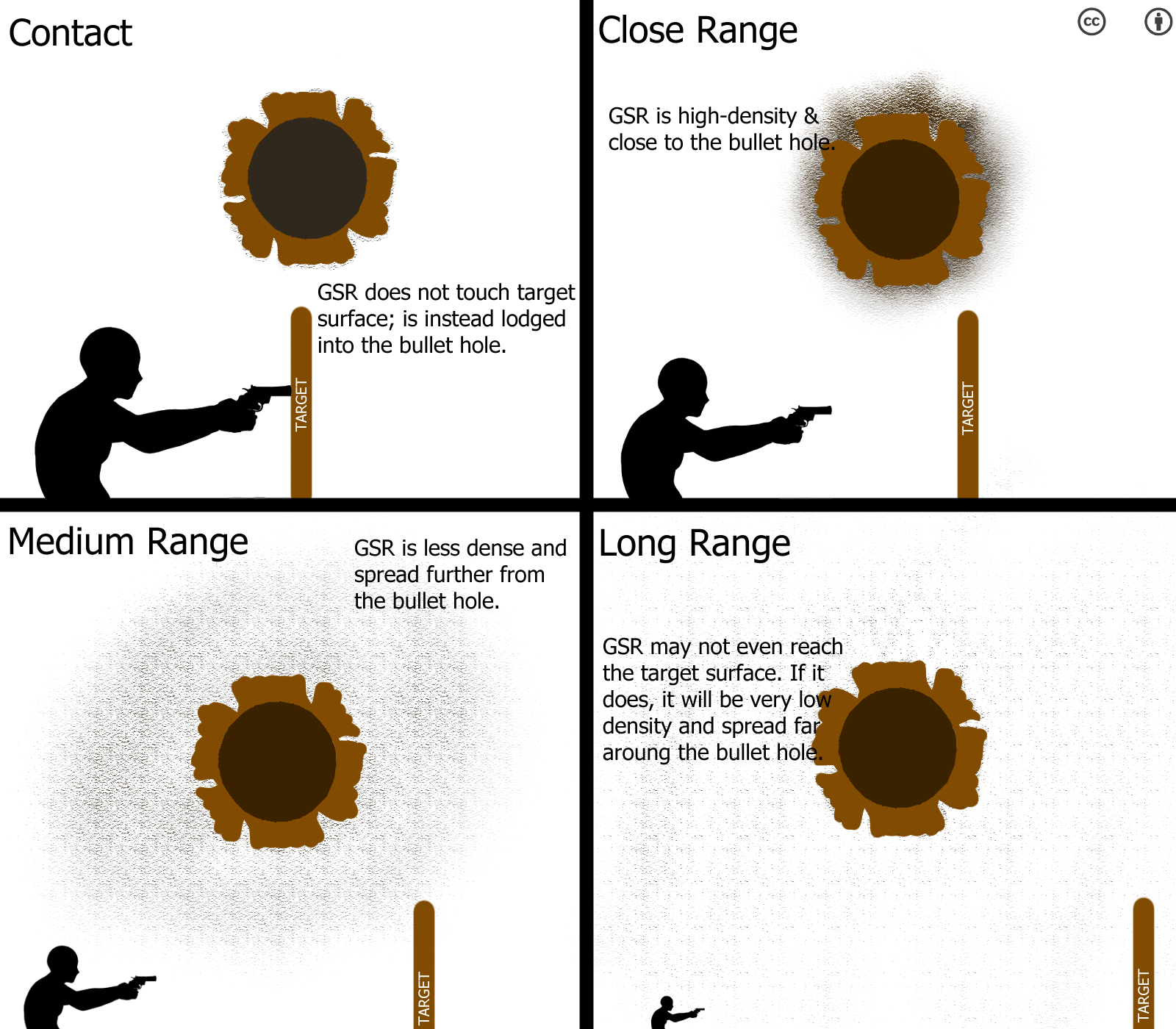
A graphic representation of the GSR left on a target when fired upon from varying ranges.

== History ==
The detection of nitrates and nitrites for GSR has been around since the early 1900s. The first recorded use of paraffin wax as a lifting medium was done by Dr. Iturrioz in 1914 and was popularized in 1933 by Teodoro Gonzalez of the Mexico City Police Laboratory. The aptly named paraffin test is also referred to as the diphenylamine test, dermal nitrate test and the Gonzalez test. This test consisted of coating a suspect's hands with paraffin wax, allowing it to solidify and peeling it away before adding a diphenylamine/sulfuric acid reagent. The presence of dark blue spots is said to indicate a positive result. This is no longer used in casework due to the high number of false positives caused by the commonality of nitrates and nitrites in a variety of mundane products such as fertilisers.

In 1971 John Boehm presented some micrographs of gunshot residue particles found during the examination of bullet entrance holes using a scanning electron microscope. If the scanning electron microscope is equipped with an energy-dispersive X-ray spectroscopy detector, the chemical elements present in such particles, mainly lead, antimony and barium, can be identified.

In 1979 Wolten et al. proposed a classification of gunshot residue based on composition, morphology, and size. Four compositions were considered characteristic:

- Lead, antimony, and barium
- Barium, calcium, and silicon
- Antimony
- Barium

The authors proposed some rules about chemical elements that could also be present in these particles.

Wallace and McQuillan published a new classification of the gunshot residue particles in 1984. They labeled as unique particles those that contain lead, antimony, and barium, or that contain antimony and barium. Wallace and McQuillan also maintained that these particles could contain only some chemical elements.

== Current practice ==
The most definitive method to determine whether a particle is characteristic of GSR is by its elemental profile. GSR mostly derives from its propellants and primer cap; which includes an explosive, oxidizer, fuel, lubricants, stabilizers and other additives. An approach to the identification of particles characteristic of or consistent with GSR is to compare the elemental profile of the recovered particulate with that collected from case-specific known source items, such as the recovered weapon, Cartridge cases or victim-related items whenever necessary. This approach was called ‘‘case by case’’ by Romolo and Margot in an article published in 2001. In 2010 Dalby et al. published the latest review on the subject and concluded that the adoption of a "case by case" approach to GSR analysis must be seen as preferable, in agreement with Romolo and Margot.

In light of similar particles produced from extraneous sources, both Mosher et al. (1998) Grima et al. (2012) presented evidence of pyrotechnic particles that can be mistakenly identified as GSR. Both publications highlight that certain markers of exclusion and reference to the general population of collected particulate can help the expert in designating GSR-similar particles as firework-sourced.

Particle analysis by scanning electron microscope equipped with an energy-dispersive X-ray spectroscopy detector is the most powerful forensic tool that investigators can use to determine a subject's proximity to a discharging firearm or contact with a surface exposed to GSR (firearm, spent cartridge case, target hole). Test accuracy requires procedures that avoid secondary gunshot residue transfer from police officers onto subjects or items to be tested, and that avoid contamination in the laboratory.

The two main groups of specialists currently active on gunshot residue analysis are the Scientific Working Group for Gunshot Residue (SWGGSR) based in USA and the ENFSI EWG Firearms/GSR Working Group based in Europe.

== SEM-EDX results ==
A positive result using SEM-EDX spectroscopy will generate x-ray spectra characteristic of GSR, likely containing combinations of metals such as Pb-Sb-Ba or Sb-Ba. Spectra may also indicate the presence of Ca, S and Si but is not always indicative of GSR. GSR may be present when an individual discharged a firearm or was close by when a discharge occurred. GSR has been observed to undergo both secondary and tertiary transfers, meaning the presence of GSR may be attributed to the persistence of the residue and the unpredictability of human interaction.

A negative result on someone could mean they were near it but not close enough for gunshot residue to land on them, or it can mean that the gunshot residue deposited on them wore off. (Note: Gunshot residue is the consistency of flour and typically only stays on the hands of a living person for 4–6 hours. Wiping the hands on anything, even putting them in and out of pockets can transfer gunshot residue off the hands. Victims do not always get gunshot residue on them; even suicide victims can test negative for gunshot residue.) Gunshot residue can also be removed from surfaces by washing, wiping, or brushing it off, so a negative result cannot fully rule out a gun was not fired by the tested object or area. Expelled gunshot residue does not travel very far from the muzzle because the particles lack momentum. Depending on the type of fire arm and ammunition used, it will typically travel no farther than 3–5 feet (0.9–1.5 meters) from the muzzle of the gun.

== Matching gunshot residue to a specific source ==
If the ammunition used was specifically tagged in some way by special elements, it is possible to know the cartridge used to produce the gunshot residue. Inference about the source of gunshot residue can be based on the examination of the particles found on a suspect and the population of particles found on the victim, in the firearm or in the cartridge case, as suggested by the ASTM Standard Guide for gunshot residue analysis by scanning electron microscopy/energy dispersive X-ray spectrometry. Advanced analytical techniques such as ion beam analysis (IBA), carried out after scanning electron microscopy, can support further information allowing one to infer about the source of gunshot residue particles. Christopher et al. showed as the grouping behaviour of different makes of ammunition can be determined using multivariate analysis. Bullets can be matched back to a gun using comparative ballistics.

== Organic gunshot residue ==
The abbreviation OGSR is often used to distinguish the organic residues found after a discharge. Organic residues can come from propellants like nitrocellulose and trinitrotoluene, plasticisers like triacetin, stabilizers like diphenylamine and possible reaction products of said compounds. The persistence of these residues is quite low compared to inorganic GSR, with very little quantities of carryover (if any). Detection of OGSR becomes difficult a mere hour after the firing. The persistence of OGSR is subject to environmental factors like wind as well as the substrate it clings to. Organic gunshot residue can be analyzed using methods such as micellar electrokinetic capillary electrophoresis (MEKC), high-performance liquid chromatography and gas chromatography-mass spectrometry.

== Presumptive tests ==
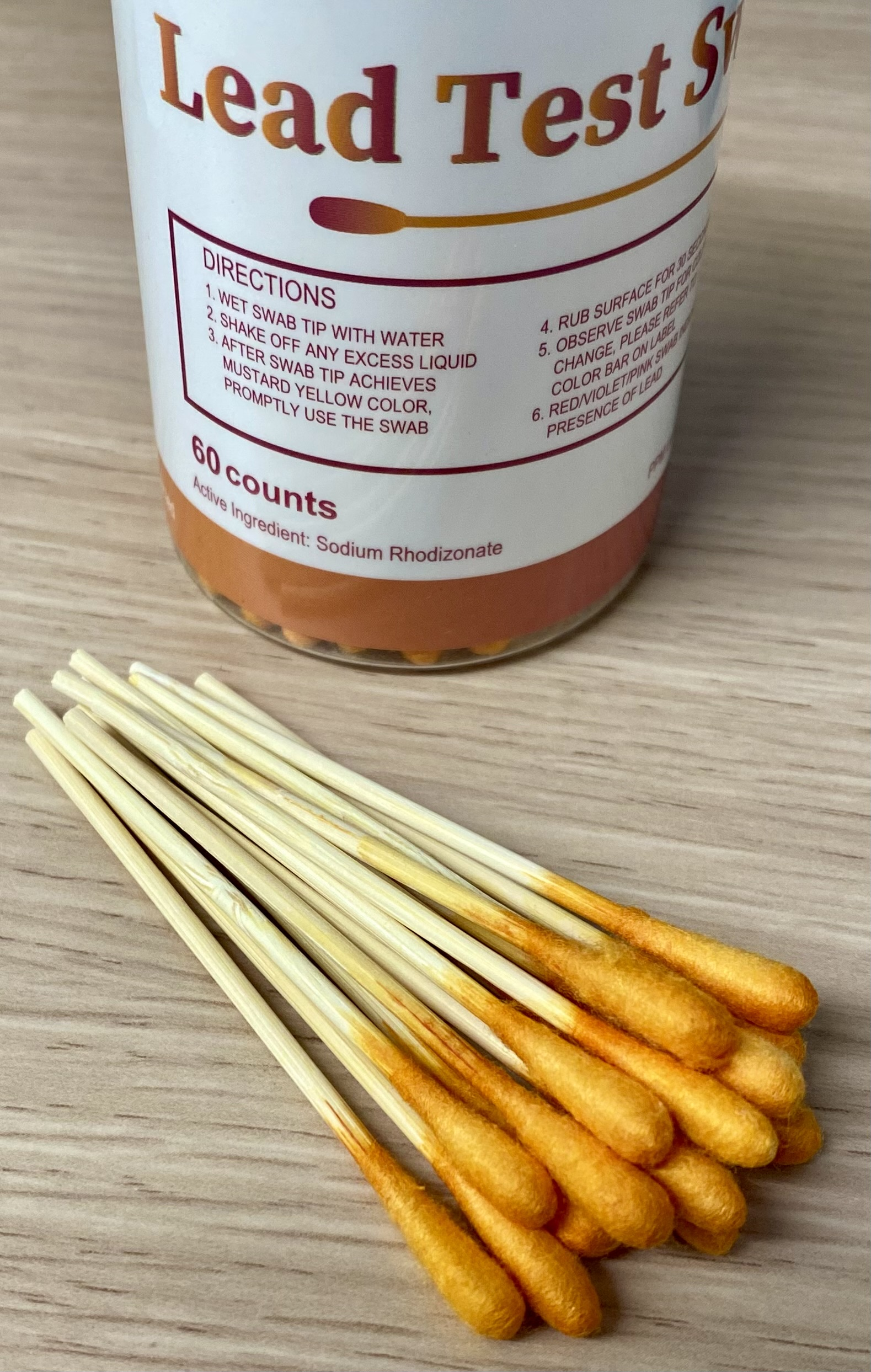
Sodium rhodizonate lead test sticks

Presumptive testing always precedes analysis of a questioned sample. Most presumptive tests involve a chemical reaction that results in a colour change that is detectable with the plain eye. Thorough documentation of the scene through notes, photographs etc. must be done prior to any presumptive or confirmatory testing in order to maintain chain of custody and avoid contamination.

The Griess test and Walker test are two presumptive tests that can be used to determine if a questioned sample contains nitrites. The Walker test is used to determine GSR area on clothing using naphthylamine-sulfanilic acid soaked photograph paper. Red colouration appears when nitrite ions are present. A variant of the Griess test reagent is sulfanilamide and naphthylamine in an acidic medium. The Modified Griess test detects nitrite compounds, which are a by-product of the combustion of gunpowder. Forensic examiners use this test to determine the gun to target distance. This test is performed first because it does not interfere with the later sodium rhodizonate test. The presence of nitrite ions is what triggers the colour change, and therefore we do not consider this test to be indicative of GSR.

The sodium rhodizonate test can detect the presence of lead and barium; it results in a red or purple color when lead is present in the tested area, and a reddish-brown colour when exposed to barium. It is an extremely sensitive, specific, and efficient method as it can obtain information on the origin of particulate debris, and it can be done on surfaces or objects. This test can't determine the precise distance of gun to target, however, it is often used around holes to determine if it is consistent with the passage of a bullet.

The Harrison and Gilroy method was introduced in 1959. It is a colorimetric test used to verify the presence of antimony, lead and/or barium. The test involves dampening a cloth with 0.1M hydrochloric acid (HCl), swabbing the item being analysed and allowing that to dry before subjecting it to various reagents. The sensitivities of the reagents used makes this test very unreliable and unrealistic for crime scene analysis.

== See also ==
- Blowback, material drawn into the barrel of a firearm post discharge

== Further Information ==
- ASTM E1588-10e1, Standard Guide for GSR analysis by Scanning Electron Microscopy/Energy Dispersive X-ray Spectrometry, American Society for Testing and Materials, West Conshohocken, PA, 2010.
- E. Boehm, Application of the SEM in forensic medicine, Scanning Electron Microscopy (1971) 553–560.
- M Christopher, J Warmenhoven, FS Romolo, M Donghi, R Webb, C Jeynes, NI Ward, A New Quantitative Method for Gunshot Residue Analysis by Ion Beam Analysis. Analyst, 2013, 138, 4649.
- O. Dalby, D. Butler, J.W. Birkett, Analysis of Gunshot Residue and Associated Materials—A Review, J. Forens. Sci. 55 (2010) 924–943.
- M. Grima, M. Butler, R. Hanson, A. Mohameden, Firework displays as sources of particles similar to gunshot residue, Science and Justice 52 (1) (2012) 49–57.
- H.H. Meng, B. Caddy, Gunshot residue analysis - review, J. Forens. Sci. 42 (1997) 553–570.
- P.V. Mosher, M.J. McVicar, E.D. Randall, E.H. Sild, Gunshot residue-similar particles produced by fireworks, Journal of the Canadian Society of Forens. Sci. 31 (3)(1998) 157–168.
- F.S. Romolo, M.E. Christopher, M. Donghi, L. Ripani, C. Jeynes, R.P. Webb, N.I. Ward, Integrated Ion Beam Analysis (IBA) in Gunshot Residue (GSR) characterisation. Forensic Sci. Int. 231 (2013), 219–228.
- F.S. Romolo. Advances in Analysis of Gunshot Residue. In Emerging Technologies for the analysis of forensic traces, Edited by Simona Francese, Springer Publishing Company, pagine 183–202, ISBN 978-3-030-20541-6.
- A.J. Schwoeble, D.L. Exline, Current Methods in Forensic Gunshot Residue Analysis, (2000) CRC Press LLC.
- J.S. Wallace, J. McQuillan, Discharge residues from cartridge-operated industrial tools, J. Forens. Sci. Soc. 24 (1984) 495–508.
- J.S. Wallace, Chemical Analysis of Firearms, Ammunition, and Gunshot Residue, (2008) CRC Press LLC.
- G.M. Wolten, R.S. Nesbitt, A.R. Calloway, G.L. Loper, P.F. Jones, Particle analysis for the detection of gunshot residue. I: Scanning electron microscopy/energy dispersive X-ray characterisation of hand deposits from firing, J. Forens. Sci. 24 (1979) 409–422.
- G.M. Wolten, R.S. Nesbitt, A.R. Calloway, G.L. Loper, Particle analysis for the detection of gunshot residue. II: occupational and environmental particles, J. Forens. Sci. 24 (1979) 423–430.
- G.M. Wolten, R.S. Nesbitt, A.R. Calloway, Particle analysis for the detection of gunshot residue. III: the case record, J. Forens. Sci. 24 (1979) 864–869.
