= Blow off =

Blowoff or Blow(ing) off may refer to:

- Blowoff valve
- Blow-off panel, areas with intentionally weakened structure, are used in enclosures, buildings or vehicles where a sudden overpressure may occur
- Blowoff, a dance event created by musicians Richard Morel and Bob Mould
- A type of extra sideshow act
- A type of clown act
- Hydrodynamic escape
- Blow(ing) off, slang for fellatio
- Blow off, slang for flatulence
- Blow off, in glossary of professional wrestling terms, the final match in a wrestling feud

== See also ==
- Blow (disambiguation)
- Blowout (disambiguation)
