= Sand dune ecology =

Interactions of sand dunes

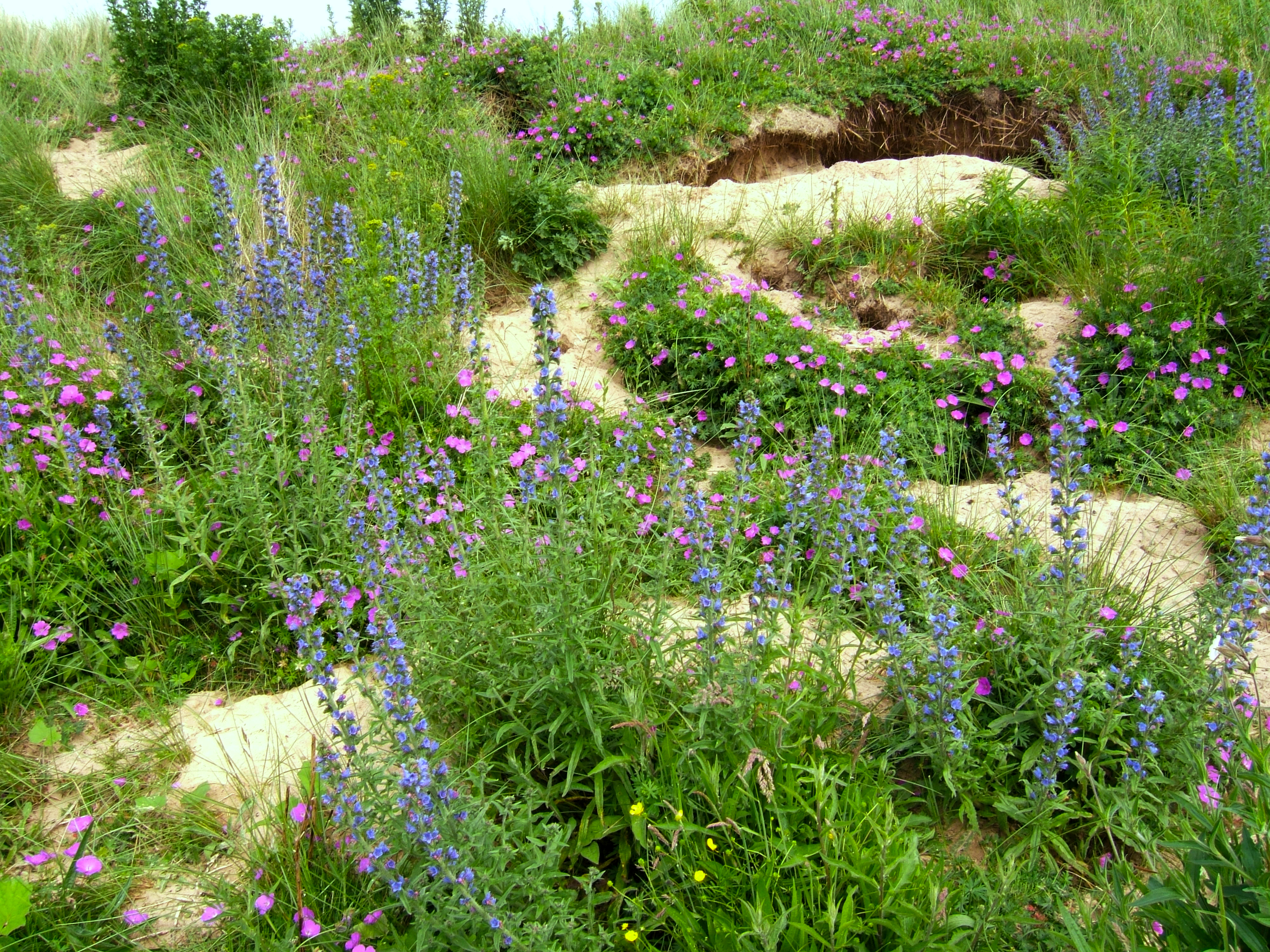
Sand dune flora dominated by Bloody Crane's-bill (pinkish-red flowers) and Viper's-bugloss (blue flowers) on the North Sea coast at Hauxley, Northumberland, UK. The holes in the sand are dug by European Rabbits, also exposing Marram Grass roots.

Sand dune ecology describes the biological and physico-chemical interactions that are a characteristic of sand dunes.

Sand dune systems are excellent places for biodiversity, partly because they are not very productive for agriculture, and partly because disturbed, stressful, and stable habitats are present in proximity to each other. Many of them are protected as nature reserves, and some are parts of larger conservation areas, incorporating other coastal habitats like salt marshes, mud flats, grasslands, scrub, and woodland.

== Plant habitat ==
Sand dunes provide a range of habitats for a range of unusual, interesting and characteristic plants that can cope with disturbed habitats. In the UK these may include restharrow Ononis repens, sand spurge Euphorbia arenaria and ragwort Senecio vulgaris - such plants are termed ruderals.

Other very specialised plants are adapted to the accretion of sand, surviving the continual burial of their shoots by sending up very rapid vertical growth. Marram grass, Ammophila arenaria specialises in this, and is largely responsible for the formation and stabilisation of many dunes by binding sand grains together. The sand couch-grass Elytrigia juncea also performs this function on the seaward edge of the dunes, and is responsible, with some other pioneers like the sea rocket Cakile maritima, for initiating the process of dune building by trapping wind blown sand.

In accreting situations small mounds of vegetation or tide-washed debris form and tend to enlarge as the wind-speed drops in the lee of the mound, allowing blowing sand (picked up from the off-shore banks) to fall out of the air stream. The pioneering plants are physiologically adapted to withstand the problems of high salt contents in the air and soil, and are good examples of stress tolerators, as well as having some ruderal characteristics.

== Inland side ==
On the inland side of dunes conditions are less severe, and links type grasslands develop with a range of grassland herbs which benefit from the reasonable nutrient status and moderately high pH of the more stable soils, especially when enough humus has accumulated in stabilised soils for water retention to be improved. Species like red fescue and lady's bedstraw are adapted to compete with each other - for nutrients, growing space and light, and are known as CSR plants - i.e. having features of Competitors, Stress tolerators and Ruderals in more or less equal proportions.

There may also be areas in old blow-outs where groundwater is near the surface, and often rises to cause flooding in the winter. Frequent, but intermittent waterlogging of the roots requires adaptations to stress, so the proportion of stress tolerators is increased here.

In nutrient-rich water, however there are some plants with very competitive strategies, like the reed (Phragmites australis). This is an example of a plant which makes rapid growth and suppresses other species by monopolising root and shoot space and shading out the opposition. Even its own seedlings are prevented from establishing within the existing population, but seeds are blown for long distances in copious quantities to start new colonies, whilst mature populations extend by rapid vegetative growth of lateral underground shoots - rhizomes.

== See also ==
- Blowout grass
- Coastal management
- Ecological succession
- Psammosere
- Sand dune stabilization
