= Blew (surname) =

Blew is a surname. Notable people with the surname include:

- Frank Blew (1902–1968), Welsh footballer
- Horace Blew (1873–1957), Welsh footballer
- Mary Clearman Blew (born 1939), American writer
- Russell Blew (born 1941), Australian Rules footballer
- William John Blew (1808–1894), English hymnist and translator

== See also ==
- Blow (surname)
