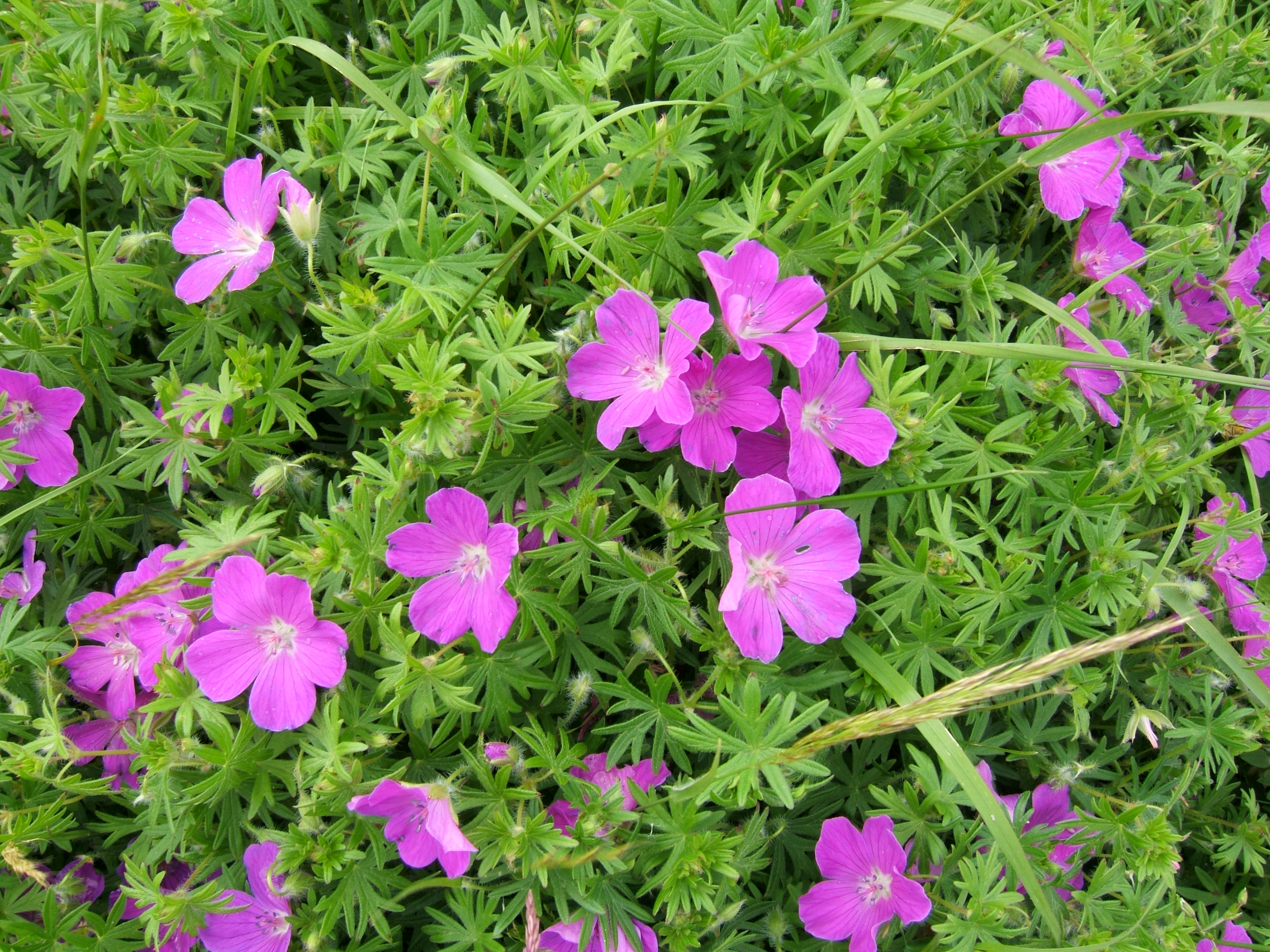
- Geranium sanguineum on the Northumberland coast

Scientific classification
- Kingdom: Plantae
- Clade: Embryophytes
- Clade: Tracheophytes
- Clade: Angiosperms
- Clade: Eudicots
- Clade: Rosids
- Order: Geraniales
- Family: Geraniaceae
- Genus: Geranium
- Species: G. sanguineum

Binomial name
- Geranium sanguineum L.

Synonyms
- Geranium grandiflorum Gilib.; Geranium lancastriense Miller (1768); Geranium lancastriense With.; Geranium prostratum Cav. (1787); Geranium sanguineiforme (Rouy) A. W. Hill

= Geranium sanguineum =

Species of flowering plant

Geranium sanguineum, common name bloody crane's-bill or bloody geranium, is a species of hardy flowering herbaceous perennial plant in the cranesbill family Geraniaceae. It is the county flower of Northumberland.

== Etymology ==
The genus name is derived from the Greek γέρανος ("géranos"), meaning crane, with reference to the fruit capsule resembling the bird's bill. The specific Latin name sanguineum means 'blood-red'; Linnaeus cites Gaspard Bauhin's 1623 book Pinax theatri botanici as his source for the name, which in turn refers ("sanguinaria radix") to a blood-red root.

== Description ==
Geranium sanguineum has a hemicryptophyte plant life-form, with its overwintering buds situated just below the soil surface, and the floral axis more or less erect with a few leaves. It has a thick rhizome. The stems are prostrate to ascending, well developed, much branched, and hairy. It reaches on average 30–50 centimetres (12–20 in) in height. The petiolate leaves have five lobes (or segments), each segment is tripartite with large teeth. The flowers are produced singly (not in clusters, as in many other Geranium species), 2.5–4 cm diameter, with petals 12–18 mm wide, and are bright crimson. The flowering period extends from May to October. The flowers are hermaphrodite and pollinated by insects (entomophily). The most common flower visitors are Syrphidae and Hymenoptera, but also butterflies and Coleoptera. The fruit is a schizocarp that breaks up into five mericarps when ripe.

== Distribution ==
Geranium sanguineum is native to most of temperate to subarctic Europe and western Asia. It is also frequent as a garden escape away from native sites.

== Habitat ==
It typically occurs in grassland, being particularly abundant on coastal sand dunes, but also in open woodland on calcareous soils, including rocky slopes. It prefers a neutral pH, with low nutritional value, at altitudes from 0 to 1,200 metres (0 to 3,937 ft) above sea level.

== Cultivation ==
It is cultivated as a garden subject, and a number of different cultivars exist. The following cultivars have gained the Royal Horticultural Society's Award of Garden Merit:

- 'Album'
- 'Ankum's Pride'
- ’Aviemore’
- 'Little Bead'
- 'Shepherd's Warning'
- G. sanguineum var. striatum
- Geranium sanguineum var. striatum 'Splendens'

== Gallery ==
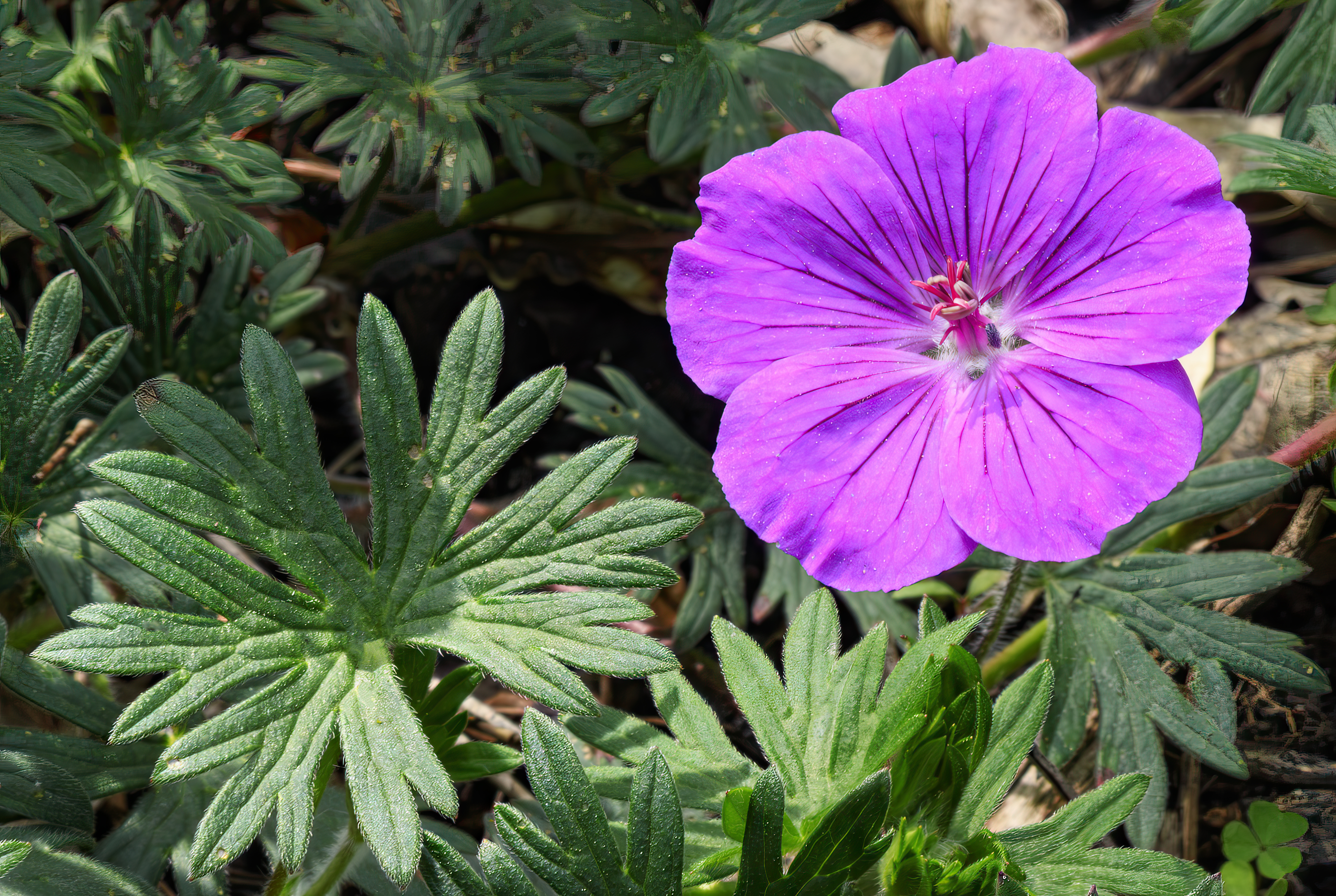

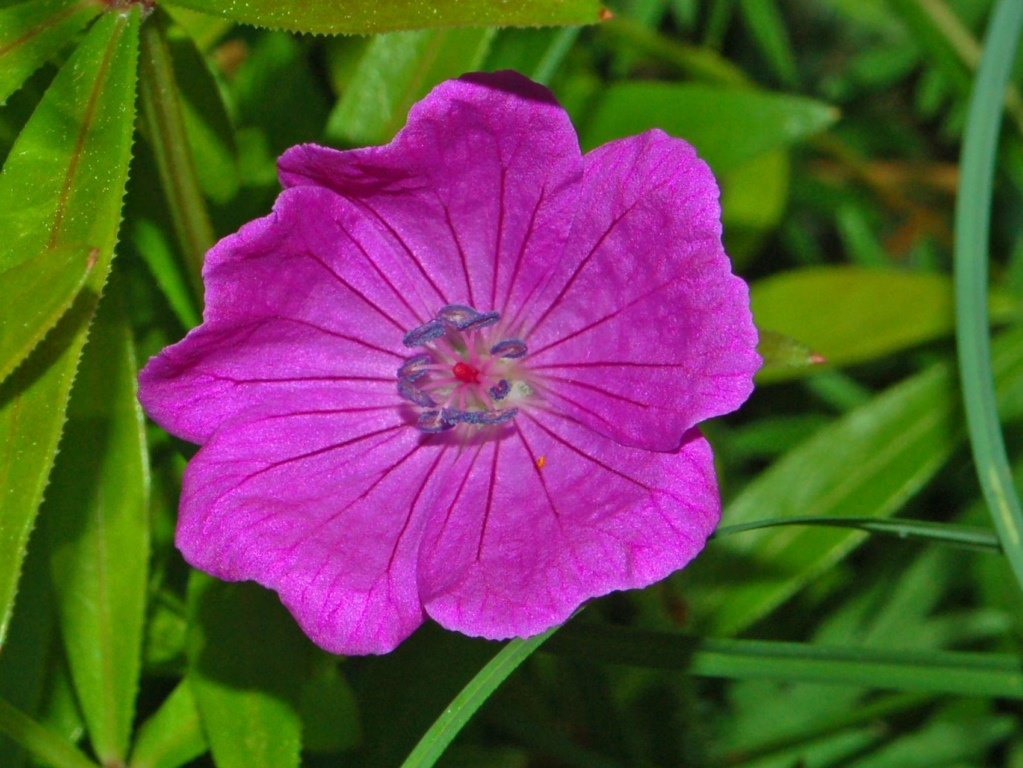

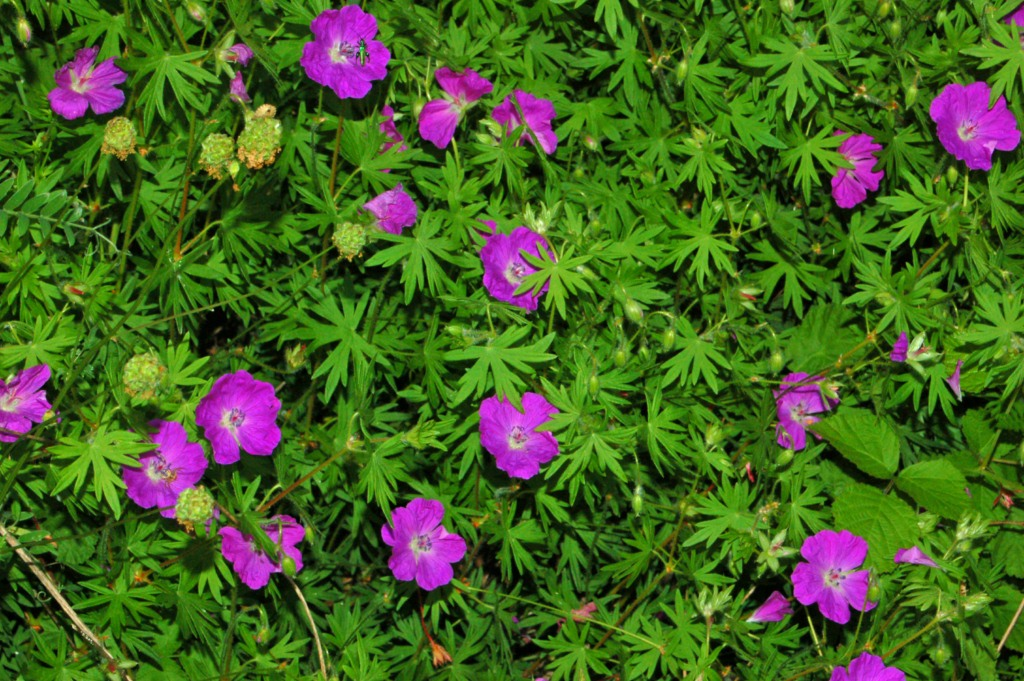

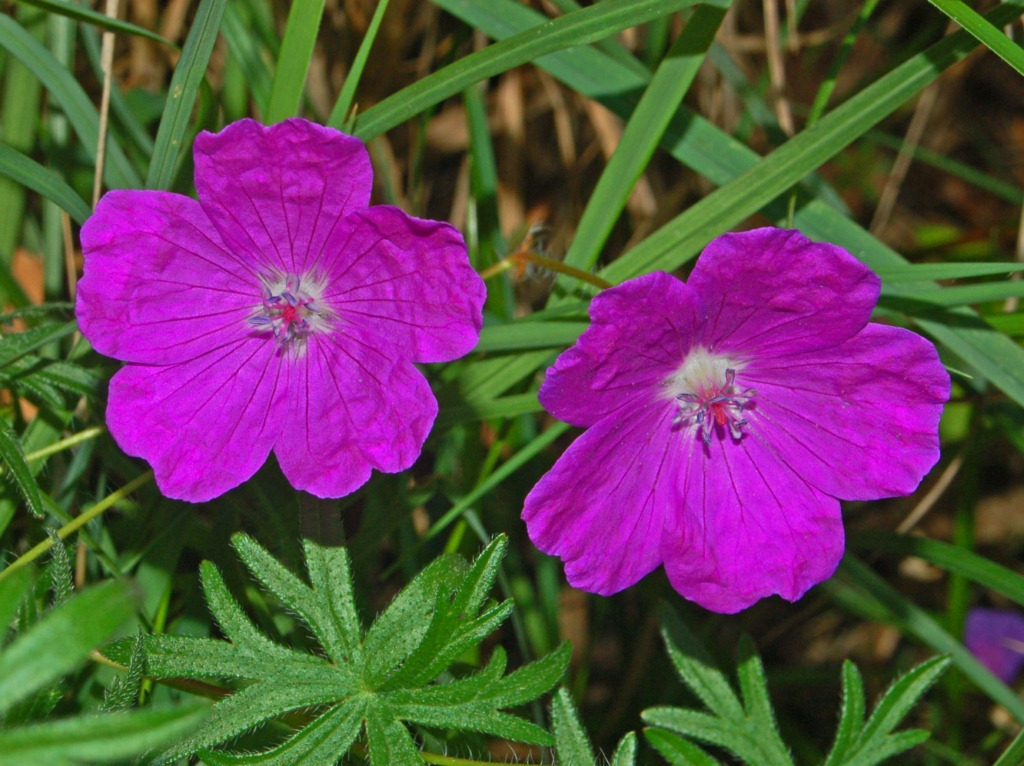

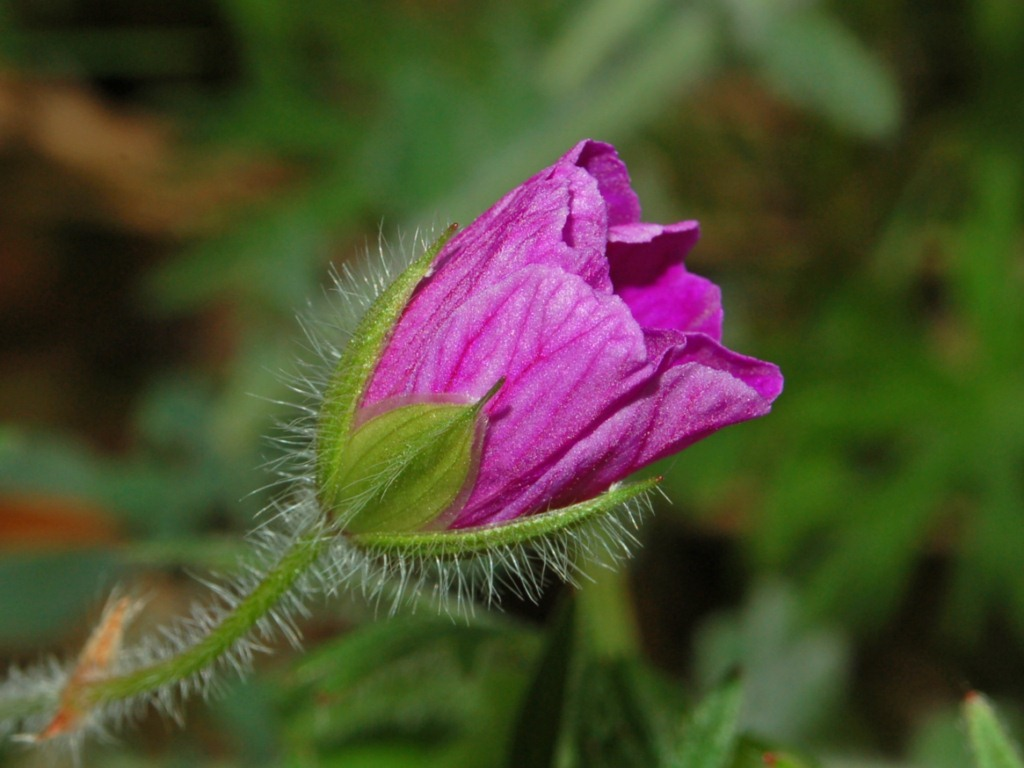

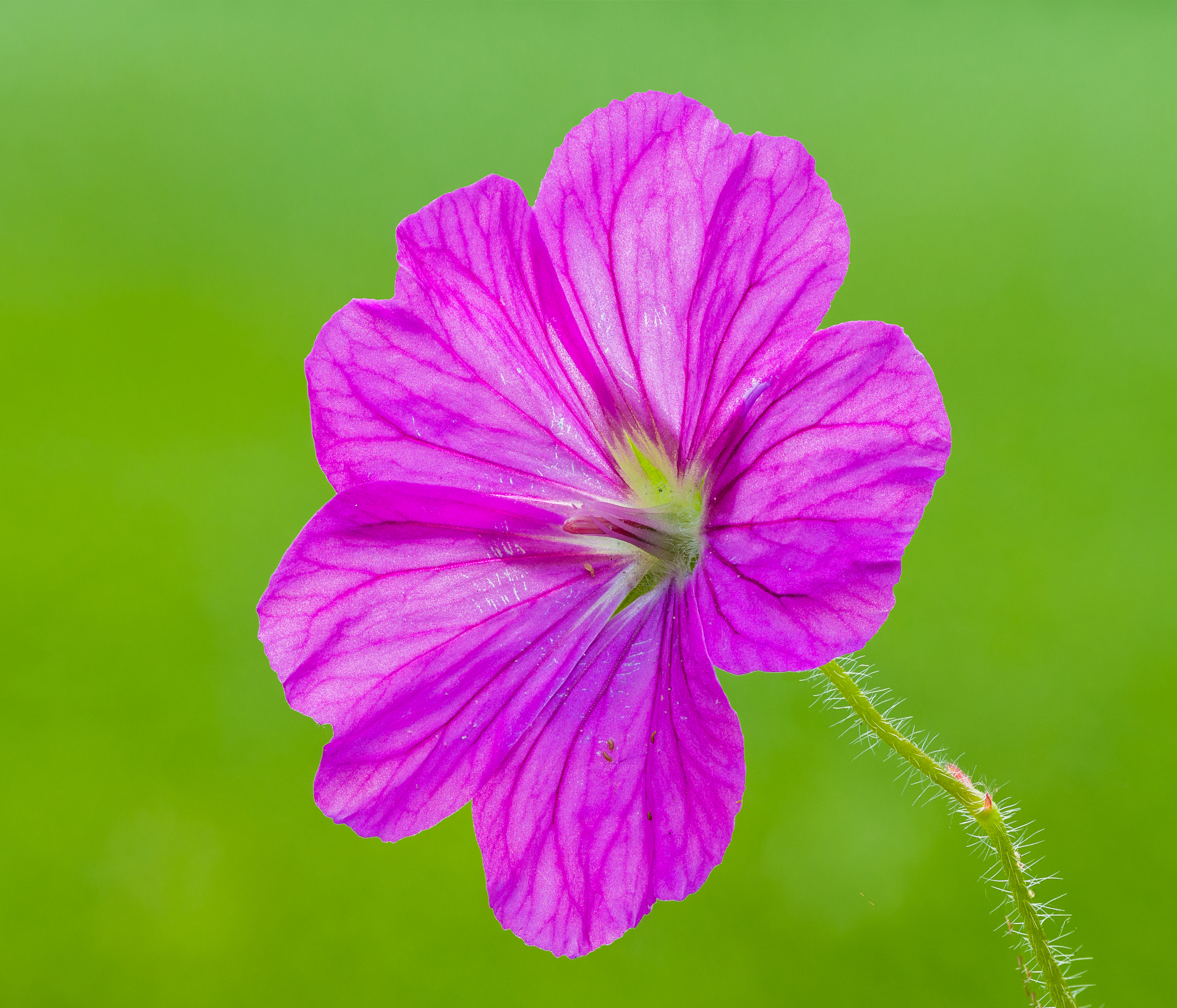

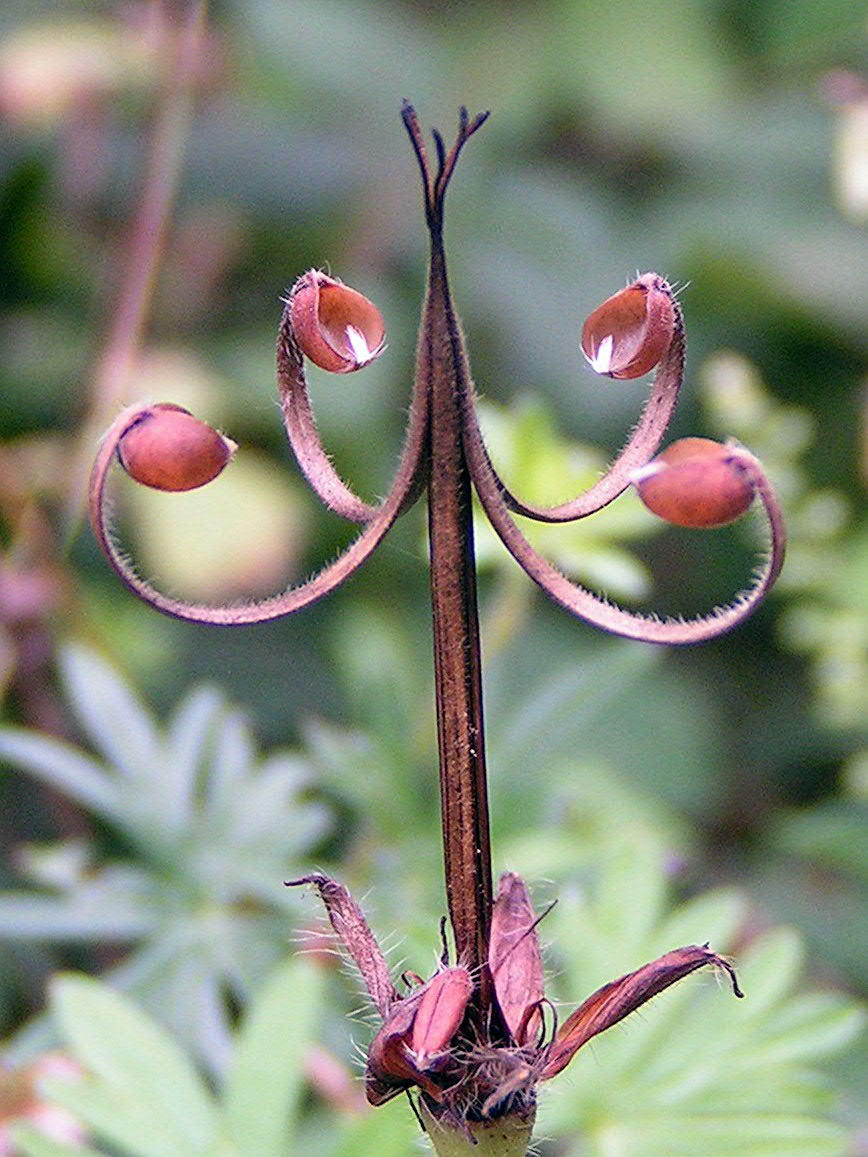
Fruits showing mericarps

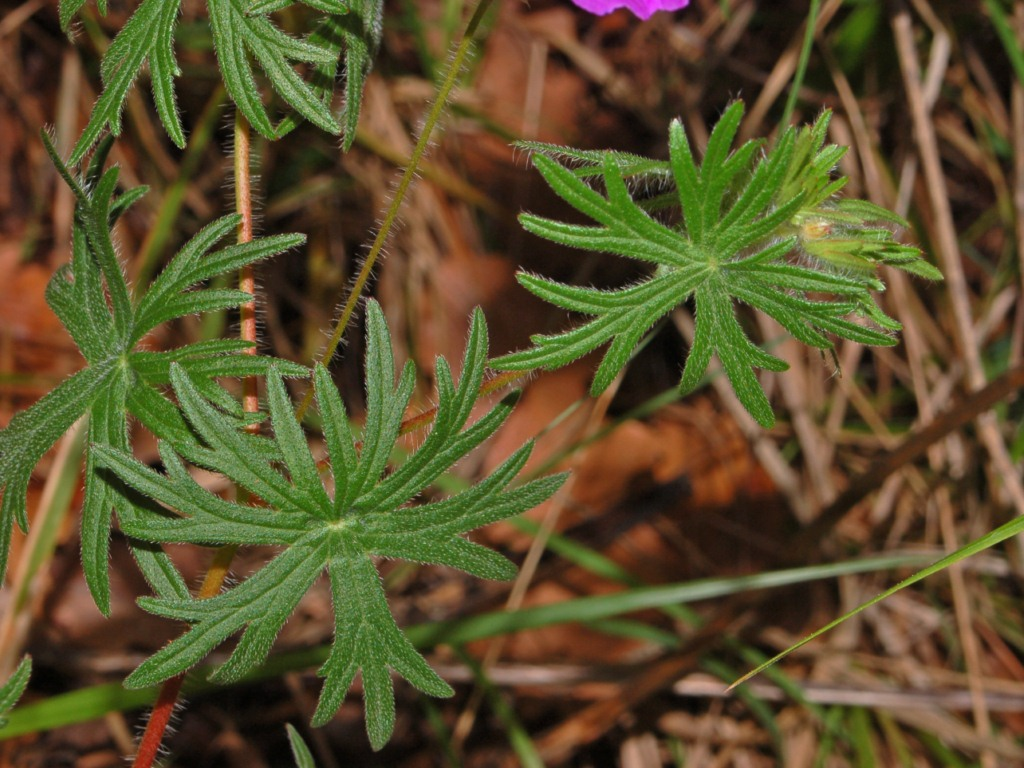

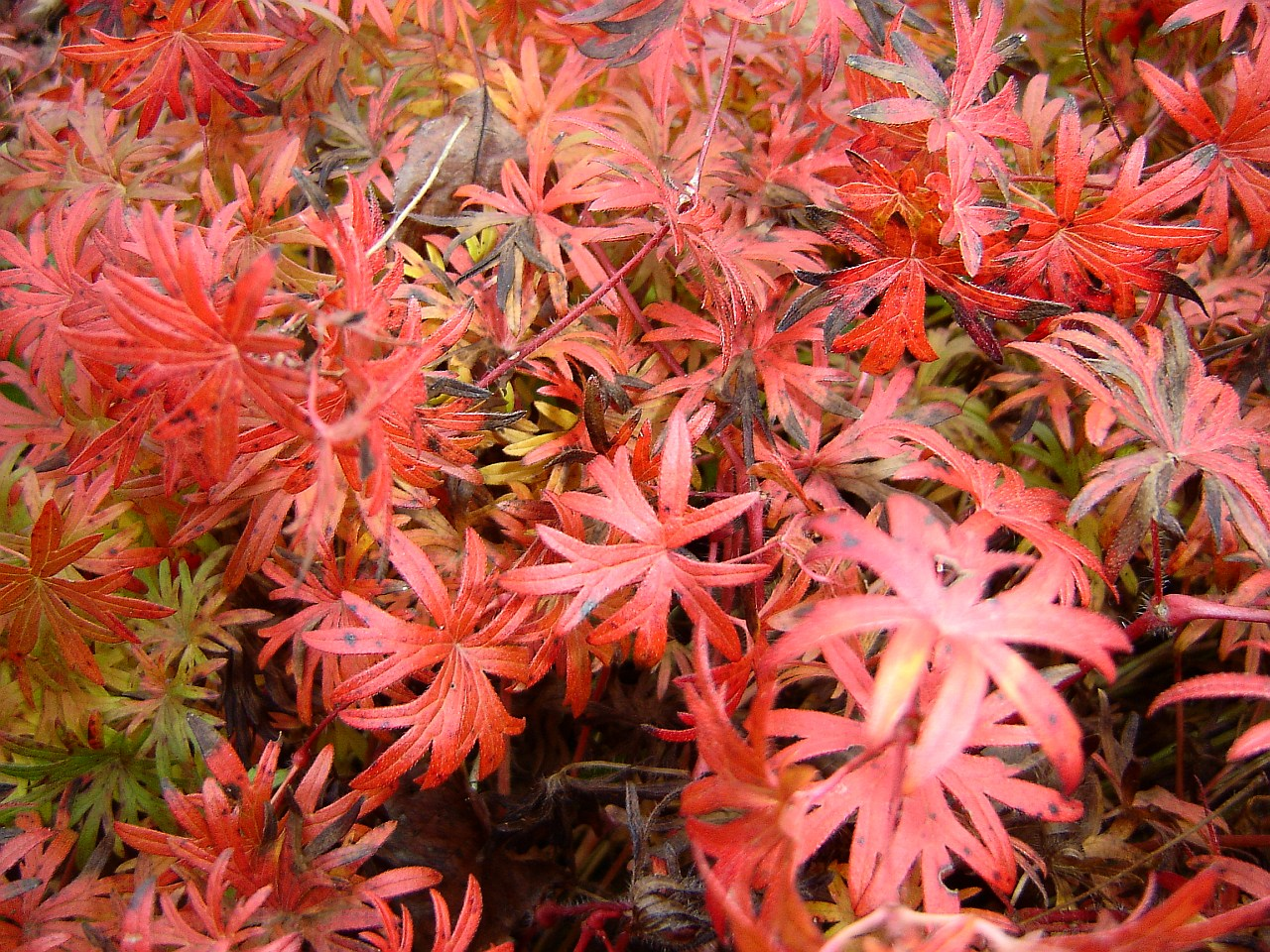
Autumn leaves

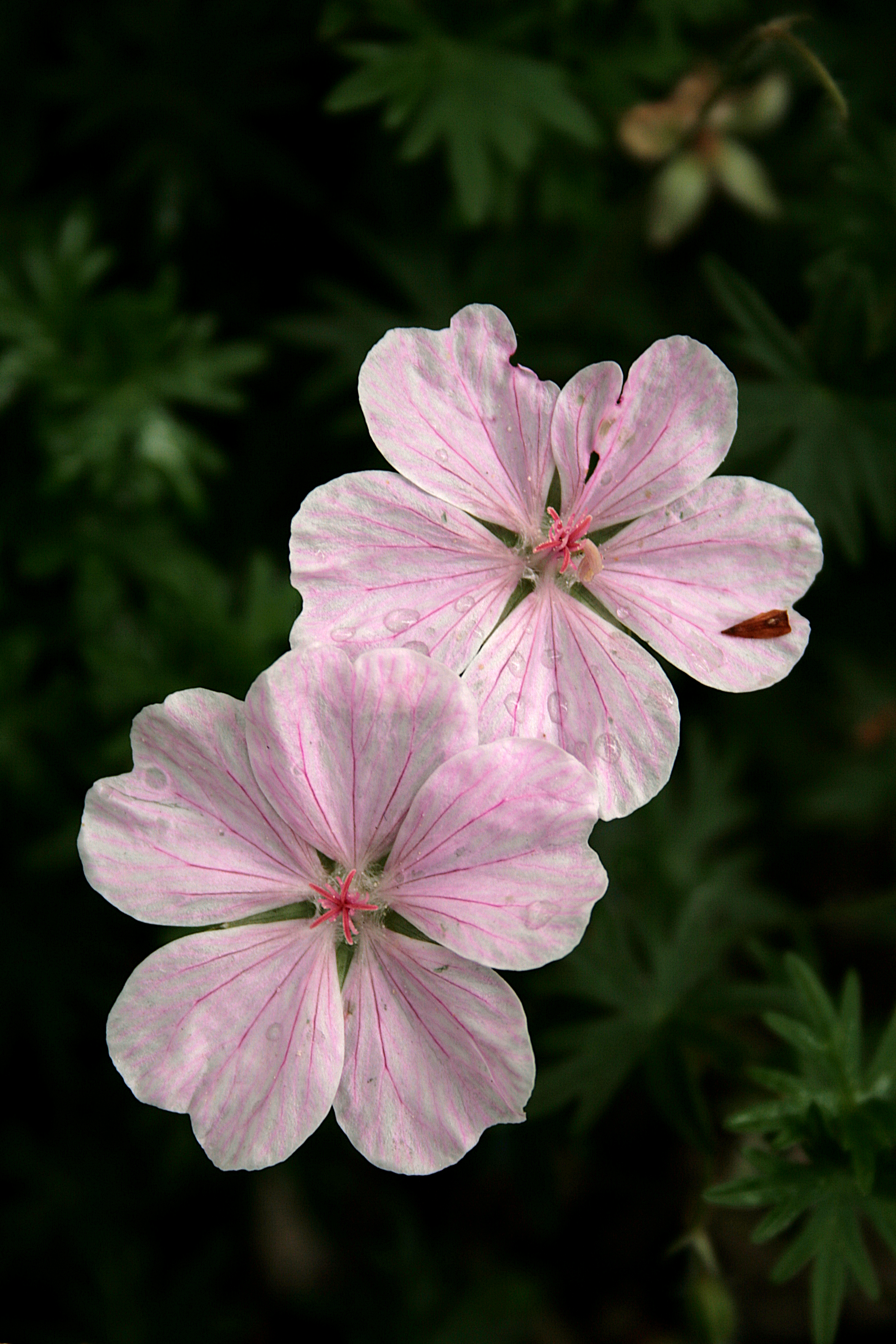
'Striatum'
