= Arte =

Franco-German TV network

Coordinates: 48.5938°N 7.7662°E

- Country: France; Germany
- Broadcast area: France; Germany (also available in Belgium, the Netherlands, Luxembourg, Monaco, Austria, Tunisia, Switzerland and Portugal)
- Headquarters: Strasbourg, France

Programming
- Languages: French; German (subtitles: English, Spanish, Polish, Italian)
- Picture format: 1080i/720p HDTV

Ownership
- Owner: Arte France (France Télévisions (45 %); French state (25%); Radio France (15%); INA (15%)); Arte Deutschland TV GmbH (ARD/ZDF)

History
- Launched: 30 May 1992; 34 years ago
- Replaced: La Cinq; La Sept

Links
- Website: arte.tv

Availability

Terrestrial
- TNT (France): Channel 7
- Digital terrestrial television (Germany): Varies by location
- Digital terrestrial television (Italy): Alto Adige SudTirol: Channel 98 (SD)

Streaming media
- ARTE Livestream: Watch Live
- ZiggoGO.tv: ZiggoGO.tv

Arte (/ɑːrˈteɪ/; French: [aʁte]; German: [ˈaʁtə]; Association relative à la télévision européenne, "Association relating to European television") is a European public service channel dedicated to culture. It is made up of three separate companies: the Strasbourg-based European Economic Interest Grouping (EEIG) ARTE, plus two member companies acting as editorial and programme production centres, Arte France in Paris (formerly known as La Sept) and Arte Deutschland in Baden-Baden (a subsidiary of the two main public German TV networks ARD and ZDF).

As an international joint venture (an EEIG), its programmes focus on audiences in both countries. Because of this, the channel has two audio tracks and two subtitle tracks, one each in French and German.

80% of Arte's programming is provided by its French and German subsidiaries, each making half of the programmes. The remainder is provided by the European subsidiary and the channel's European partners. Selected programmes are available with English, Spanish, Polish and Italian subtitles online.

ARTE is governed by its Management Board, chaired by President Heike Hempel and Vice President Bruno Patino. The Management Board reports to the General Assembly, chaired by Jean-Dominique Giuliani (seconded from Arte France) and Katrin Vernau (seconded from Arte Deutschland).

== History ==
The ARTE building in Strasbourg

Arte was initiated as a symbol of Franco-German friendship and had been championed since 1988 by French President François Mitterrand and German Chancellor Helmut Kohl. It came to fruition on 2 October 1990, when an Interstate Treaty was signed between France and the German Länder.

Arte began transmissions in 1992, filling frequencies left unused by the demise of La Cinq, the first French commercial television network (created in 1986). The opening night on 30 May 1992 was broadcast live from the Strasbourg Opera House.

Arte started as an evening-only service. In the daytime, its frequencies were shared with other channels. A public channel called Télé Emploi occupied the French frequencies for about a month in 1994, before the start of La Cinquième (now France 5) in December that year. For viewers in Germany, Arte was assigned a frequency on the Astra 1D satellite in late 1994, and it was eventually shared with Nickelodeon Germany, later replaced by the new public children's channel Kika.

In 1996, it started offering an afternoon schedule with reruns for viewers on digital satellite and digital cable. A "proper" afternoon schedule with programmes between 14:00 and 19:00 was introduced on 6 January 2001. The channel eventually got its own analogue frequency on the Astra satellites.

Arte has been broadcasting 24/7 since 2005. In 2007 the online catch-up service ARTE+7 was launched and offers free access to a broad range of programs within seven days of their original transmission.

In October 2020, Arte marked 30 years since the signing of its founding treaty between France and Germany.

== Transmission and reception ==
ARTE programmes are available with multi-channel audio: all programmes are broadcast in French and German. In addition, whenever possible the original version is offered with French and German subtitles and the hearing or visually impaired may get subtitles or audio description. Since 2015 a selection of programmes have been available online which include English and Spanish subtitles. Polish was to follow in late 2016.

The channel is widely available in Europe. Both the German and the French versions can be received in nearly all of Europe via satellite Astra1 (19, 2° East) and the French version is also available via Hot Bird (13° East). ARTE is also relayed by all cable networks in Germany and France. It is also available on numerous cable networks in Austria, Belgium, Finland, Luxembourg, Switzerland, and the Netherlands.

Arte has been broadcast since 2008 in HD in Germany and France. Like the national channels of their own respective countries, the German HDTV version of ARTE broadcasts in 720p50, while the French one broadcasts in 1080i25. Broadcasting Center Europe (BCE), a subsidiary of RTL Group and located in Luxembourg (formerly known as CLT-UFA and before its merger with UFA, the Compagnie Luxembourgeoise de Télédiffusion), provides most of the technical services for Arte.

In April 2016 Arte co-produced, (with Astra satellite owner, SES) a live Ultra-high-definition television broadcast of the Le Corsaire ballet from the Vienna State Opera. The programme was transmitted free-to-air on the UHD1 demonstration channel from the Astra 19.2°E satellites.

In July 2016, the Italian public broadcaster RAI Com signed a partnership agreement with Arte to collaborate on coproductions and programme acquisitions. In November 2016, the Irish public television RTÉ signed a partnership agreement with Arte to produce programmes related to arts, culture and history as well as web content for ARTE Concert and ARTE in English. Arte also has agreements with Yle (Finnish public broadcasting) and Film Fund Luxembourg (a national fund that supports Luxembourgish audiovisual productions).

Arte programmes can be streamed live or watched on catch-up TV for at least 7 and up to 700 days on the arte.tv platform and on ARTE Concert.

=== International ===
In Africa Arte is broadcast via satellite, cable and MMDS, and in many other countries via the digital service CanalSat Horizons. Many French-language Arte programmes are also broadcast in Canada on the Ici ARTV cable channel, the majority-owned by the Canadian Broadcasting Corporation (85%) and Arte itself (15%). The Australian Special Broadcasting Service translates many Arte programmes into English for broadcast on its own television network and overseas. In the United Kingdom, Arte, as well as many of its programmes, are available to watch via Learning on Screen.

== Market share ==
Arte usually has more viewers in France than in Germany. In 2015, its share of overall viewing was about 2.2% in France and about 1% in Germany. Before cable and satellite became widely used in France, Arte was available to almost everyone as one of six analogue terrestrial channels. The other five channels were not direct competitors to Arte. In Germany, widespread cable and satellite penetration meant the vast majority of German households had access to about three dozen channels, including several from public broadcasters with content similar to that seen on Arte.

== Programming ==
- The Human Adventure – documentary series (1997–present)
- Arte Journal – news program (1992–present)
- Arte Reportage – current affairs program (2004–present)
- Arte Themenabend – themed evenings
- A Very Secret Service – spy comedy (2015–2018)
- The Boys from Baghdad High – documentary film
- Die Nacht/La Nuit – late-night news
- Do Not Track, a 2015 Arte co-produced web documentary
- Durch die Nacht mit … (2002–present)
- Geo 360° (1999–present)
- Karambolage – a show about French/German customs (2004–present)
- Kurzschluss (2001–present)
- Metropolis (2001–present)
- Mapping the World – geopolitical documentary (1992–present)
- Tracks – music program (1997–present)
- TV Around the World – documentary-magazine series (2005–2011)
- WunderWelten (2005–2009)
- Venice New Year's Concert (2016–present)

=== Series ===
- 1864 (2015)
- Ad Vitam (2018)
- Alexander the Great (2014)
- Apple Tree Yard (2018)
- Blow Up (2010–present)
- Borgen (2012–2015)
- Breaking Bad – Award-winning American drama series (2010–2015)
- Capital (2017)
- Captain Alatriste (2015, 2017)
- DCI Banks (2012–2016)
- Den fjärde mannen (2017)
- Eyewitness (Øyevitne) (2015, 2017)
- Fatale-Station (2017)
- Fortitude (2017)
- Gomorrha (2015, 2017)
- Hatufim (2013–2016)
- Hierro (2019, 2021)
- Hotel Beau Séjour (2017)
- Im Angesicht des Verbrechens (2010–2011, 2013)
- Jekyll (2009–2010)
- Kidnap and Ransom (Der Jäger – Geld oder Leben) (2015)
- Kommissarin Lund (Forbrydelsen) (2010–2012, 2014–2015, 2017)
- Les quatre soeurs (2018)
- Lilyhammer (2014, 2016)
- Maroni (2018)
- Monroe (2013–2014)
- National Treasure (2018)
- Occupied (Okkupert) (2015, 2018)
- Paris (2015)
- Peaky Blinders (2015–present)
- Points de Repères (2016–2017)
- Rectify (2014–2015)
- River (2018)
- The Darwinners (Silex and the City) (2012–2017)
- Suburban Shootout (2010)
- The Code (2015, 2017)
- The Hour (2013)
- The Slap (2011) (2013, 2015)
- The Spiral (2012, 2017)
- Transferts (2017)
- Virage Nord (Nordkurve) (2014–2015)
- Wolf Hall (2016–2017)

== Online ==
=== arte.tv ===
arte.tv is the channel's streaming service. It is accessible from browsers and Arte apps for smartphones and smart TVs. Arte.tv programmes are organised by theme or genre. They include feature films, documentaries and documentary cinema covering topics such as social affairs, the arts, history, nature and science, series, short and TV films, music and theatre performances, magazine shows, reportage and news, and web-based formats.

Arte's first digital effort was called ARTE+7, launched in September 2007. Initial it was a catch-up service, allowing viewers to watch ARTE programmes up to seven days after they were broadcast on television. arte.tv has also been available for streaming in Germany and France since 2012. Most programmes can be streamed from 5 am on the morning of broadcast and remain available on replay for up to 90 days, sometimes longer. Some programmes are made available online ahead of transmission. Most of arte.tv now consists of web-only content.

Arte also has a podcast site, called Arte Radio. Most of its programmes are in French.

ARTE Extra is a new feature, launched in HbbTV in 2020. Arte Extra provides four "smart playlists" related to topics such as society, discovery and music which are put together from programmes available on arte.tv. The playlists can be accessed by pushing the red button on the remote control.

An annual Arte film festival takes place online in December. It promotes the European film d'auteur scene and presents films of young directors accessible in 45 European countries in ten languages. Each month, the "ArteKino Selection" offers one film available in six languages on arte.tv.

=== ARTE in six languages ===
Since November 2015 Arte has been making selected programme content – above all documentaries, magazines and live arts – available online with English and Spanish subtitles. Since November 2016 a selection of programmes have featured Polish subtitles. Italian subtitles have been provided since June 2018. This online service is co-funded by the European Commission, enabling 70% of Europeans to watch ARTE in their native language.

=== ARTE Concert ===
ARTE Concert (known until 2014 as Arte Live Web) streams a selection of new and recent stage performances. These might be Arte co-productions or recordings by partners, including major venues and independent companies, festivals, and autonomous artists, producers and websites. Genres covered include opera, rock music, theatre, chamber music, jazz and electronic music. Apart from plays and concerts, it also offers backstage reports, exclusive interviews with performers and key figures at various festivals, and extracts from dress rehearsals. The livestreaming platform United We Stream was launched in 2020 in response to the closure of venues due to the COVID-19 pandemic. Every day DJs and concerts are streamed live from empty clubs to audiences around the world in partnership with a wide range of performers. ARTE Concert streams more than 900 live shows and replays a year.

In 2018, Arte launched its online opera season. As part of ARTE Concert, it provides access to new opera productions from various European opera houses by live stream or video on demand in six languages via subtitles. The 2020/2021 opera season featured 21 opera houses from 12 European countries with both classic and contemporary productions.

=== Digital productions ===
ARTE produces digital games, including Type:Rider, Bury Me, My Love.

=== Former themed platforms ===
In 2009, ARTE Concert (formerly Arte Live Web) was launched, an online platform providing live broadcasts of festivals and concerts. In 2017, the arte.tv platform absorbed the themed platforms ARTE Creative, ARTE Future, ARTE Info and ARTE Cinema, which previously were separate units. ARTE Concert is still organised as a separate brand integrated into Arte's online architecture.

Logos of former themed platforms
Arte Live logo

Arte+7 logo

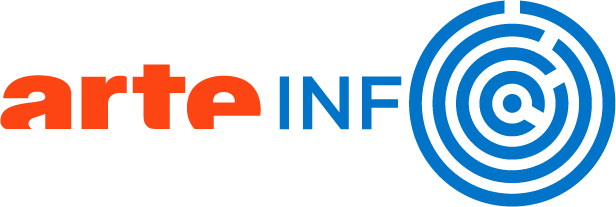
Arte Info logo

Arte Future logo

Arte CREATIVE logo

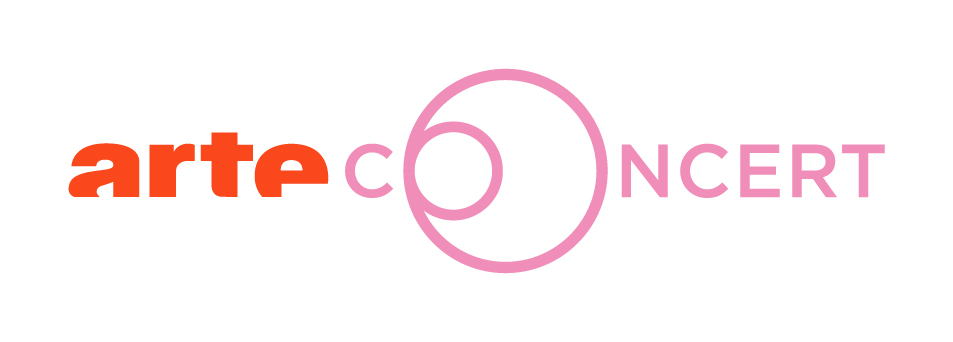
Arte Concert logo

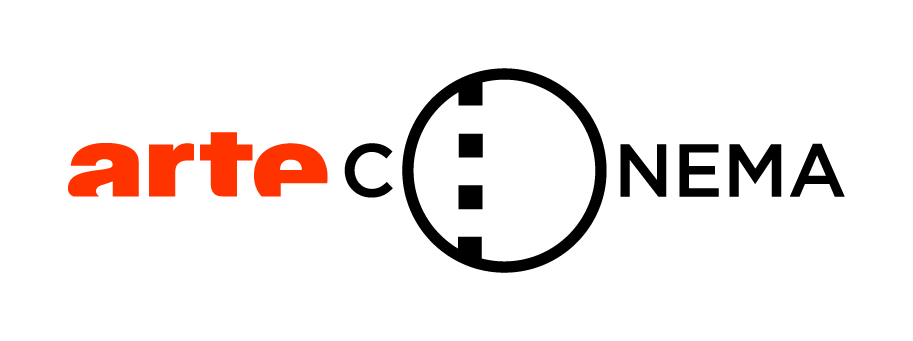
Arte Cinema logo

== Logos ==
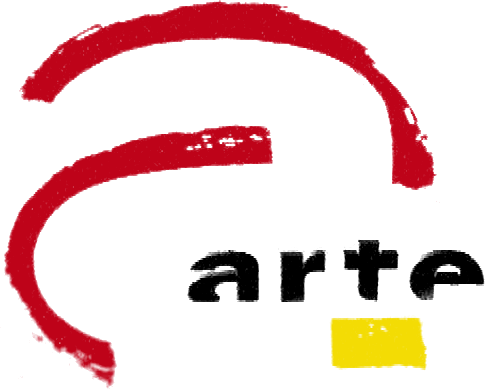
Arte's first logo, used from 30 May 1992 until 2 January 1995

Arte's second and current logo since 2 January 1995

Alternate version of the 1995 logo, used from 3 January 2004 until 27 February 2011

Orange version of the 1995 logo, used from 28 February 2011 until 24 March 2017 and since 22 April 2026

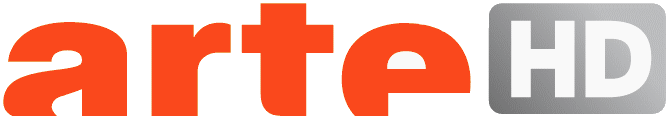
HD logo, used since 10 June 2010

90° rotated version of the 1995 logo, used from 25 March 2017 until 22 April 2026

== Awards ==
In the course of the channel's history, Arte productions and coproductions have received a number of important film awards, including several Oscars, Palmes d'Or (Cannes Film Festival), Golden Bears, Golden Lions, Golden Leopards, César Awards for Best Film and Best Documentary Film as well as Lolas in gold for the best film and the best documentary.

In 2016, PRIX EUROPA awarded Arte the "Lifetime Achievement Award" in honour of "extraordinary achievements in the European media world".

== See also ==
- European Institutions in Strasbourg
- France–Germany relations

=== Thematic focuses ===
- Visual arts
- Classical music
- Art Film
- Literature
- Light art
- Poetry
- Design
- Fine-art photography
- Video production
