= Blowout =

Blowout or Blow out may refer to:

== Film and television ==
- Blow Out, a 1981 film by Brian De Palma
- The Blow Out, a 1936 short film
- Blow Out (TV series), a TV series on Bravo
- "Blow Out" (Prison Break), an episode of Prison Break
- "Blowout", an episode of Mayday
- "Blow Out", an episode of MacGyver
- La Grande Bouffe, a 1973 Italian film, know in English as Blow-Out

== Science and technology ==
- Blowout (geomorphology), a sandy depression caused by the removal of sediment by wind
- Blowout (tire), a sudden loss of tire pressure
- Blowout (well drilling), a sudden release of oil and gas from a well
  - Blowout preventer, a type of safety valve
- Blowout grass, a type of grass found on sand dunes
- Blowout fracture, a type of skull fracture
- Blowout panel, a protective feature of ammunition bins
- Blown out, a type of wave

== Music ==
- "Blow Out", a song by Radiohead
- "Blowout", a song by the Crystal Method
- "Blow Out", a single by Konomi Suzuki used in Akashic Records of Bastard Magic Instructor.
- Blowout (album), a 2023 album by John Carroll Kirby

== Other uses ==
- Blowout (haircut), a shorter hairstyle also known as a temple fade
- Blowout (hairstyle), a longer hairstyle also known as a Dominican blowout
- Blowout (sports), an easy or one-sided victory
- BlowOut, a 2003 video game
- Blowout, Texas, an unincorporated community
- Party horn or blow-out
- Blowout, a novel by Byron Dorgan and David Hagberg
- Blowout (book), a 2019 non-fiction book by Rachel Maddow
- The 1968 Chicano Blowouts, or East L.A. walkouts

== See also ==
- Blown out highlights, in photography
