= Blow up =

Blow up, Blow-up or Blowup may refer to:

- Explosion
- Total body disruption, a cause of death typically associated with explosion
- An inflatable
- Blowing up, a mathematical operation
- Blowup, a 1966 film by Michelangelo Antonioni
- "Blow-Up" (short story), a short story by Julio Cortázar
- Blow-up and Other Stories, a short story collection by Julio Cortázar
- Blow Up (magazine), an Italy-based music magazine
- Blow Up (Dutch TV series)
  - Blow Up (Australian TV series), Australian adaptation of the Dutch television series
- Blow Up (web series)

== Music ==
- Blow Up (band), a British indie band
- Blow Up (club), a nightclub in Munich, established in 1967
- Blow Up (club night), a club night in London, established in 1993
- Blow Up (Bobby Hutcherson album), 1969
- Blow Up (The Smithereens album), 1991
- Blow-Up (soundtrack), an album by Herbie Hancock, featuring music composed for the 1966 film
- Blow Up (EP), a 2004 EP by The Presets
- Blow Up, an album by Bomba Estéreo
- Blow Up Records, a UK record label
- Blow Up, a song by Devo from the album "Total Devo"
- Blow Up, a song by Sammy Adams

== See also ==
- Enlarger
- Image scaling
- Blow Out, a 1981 film by Brian De Palma
