= Blowback =

Blowback may refer to:

== Firearms ==
- Blowback (firearms), a system of operation for self-loading firearms that obtains energy from the motion of the cartridge case as it is pushed to the rear by expanding gases created by the ignition of the propellant charge
- Blowback (forensics), vacuum effect created in the barrel of a firearm when it is discharged
- Blowback, firearm discharge materials a concern for Shooting range#Common safety practices

== Media and entertainment ==
- "Blowback", a 2020 song by the Killers from Imploding the Mirage
- Blowback (film), a 2000 film
- Blowback (album), a 2001 album by rapper Tricky
- "Blowback" (FlashForward), a 2010 FlashForward episode
- "Blowback" (Justified), a 2010 episode of Justified
- "Blowback" (Alias episode)
- Blowback (Journeyman)
- Blowback (NCIS)
- Blowback (podcast), a podcast about American history and foreign policy
- Blowback (The Shield)
- Blowback Productions, an independent film and television production company
- Blowback, a 2005 thriller novel by Brad Thor
- Blowback, a 2009 military action thriller novel by Mukul Deva
- Blowback, a 2013 spy novel by former United States CIA operations officer Valerie Plame

== Other uses ==
- Blowback (intelligence), unintended consequences of a covert operation that are suffered by the civil population of the aggressor government
- Blowback: The Costs and Consequences of American Empire, a 2000 nonfiction book by Chalmers Johnson
- Another term for backscatter (email)
- An aerodynamic phenomenon affecting helicopter rotors also called flap back
- Blowback (steam engine), a type of failure, often catastrophic, of a steam engine
