= Karambolage =

Franco-German TV series or program

- Genre: Documentary film
- Created by: Claire Doutriaux
- Theme music composer: Studio production
- Countries of origin: Germany; France
- Original languages: German; French

Production
- Running time: 12 minutes
- Production company: ARTE

Original release
- Release: 2004 – present

Karambolage is a television series broadcast Sunday evenings at 6:55 p.m. in Germany and at 8:35 p.m. in France on the Franco-German television channel arte. Each episode is roughly 12 minutes long, and is usually broken up into three or four segments.

The title is the German version of the French loan word carambolage, which means "carom" or "collision". As such, Karambolage aims to explore the differences, similarities, and overlaps of French and German culture through anecdotes, household objects that are common in one country, yet virtually unknown in the other, as well as brief, tongue-in-cheek lectures by etymologists, historians, and the like.

The anecdotal segments are often accompanied by simple, stylized animation. In recent years, the makers of the series have also included segments dedicated to the experiences of members of the larger immigrant populations of both countries; i.e. the Turks in Germany and the West- and North Africans in France.

At the end of each episode, viewers can participate in a sort of guessing game, in which a thirty second long video recording of a public place is shown. Participants are then asked to determine whether the shot was recorded in Germany or France based on the presence of a key detail, such as road signs or businesses unique to that country. Anyone who can determine the country and name the key detail can then mail the solution to arte by postcard or submit it on the station's website. From the correct solutions, ten winners are randomly pulled and receive a small prize.
