= Sand dune stabilization =

Coastal management practice

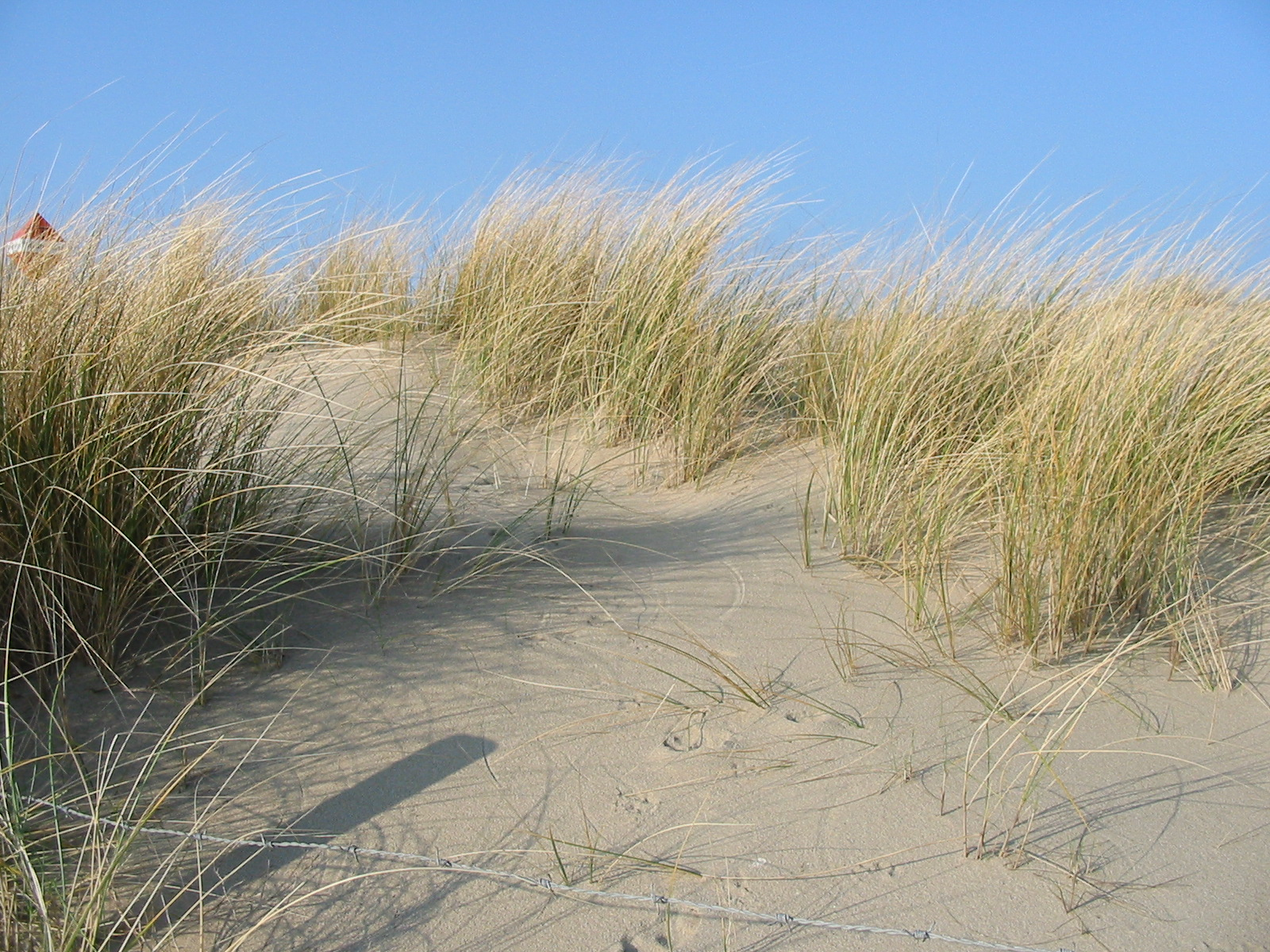
Ammophila or beachgrass

Sand dune stabilization is a coastal management practice designed to prevent erosion of sand dunes. Sand dunes are common features of shoreline and desert environments. Dunes provide habitat for highly specialized plants and animals, including rare and endangered species. They can protect beaches from erosion and recruit sand to eroded beaches. Dunes are threatened by human activity, both intentional and unintentional (see sand theft and sand mining). Countries such as the United States, Australia, Canada, New Zealand, the United Kingdom, and Netherlands, operate significant dune protection programs.

Stabilizing dunes involves multiple actions. Planting vegetation reduces the impact of wind and water. Wooden sand fences can help retain sand and other material needed for a healthy sand dune ecosystem. Footpaths protect dunes from damage from foot traffic.

The location of the dune limits the types of plant that can thrive there. Beach dunes consist of the foredune, the angled side which faces the ocean, the sand plain at the top of the dune, which may or may not be present, and the backdune, the angled side that faces away from the ocean.

== Foredune flora ==
Plants that thrive on the foredune must be tolerant to salt spray, strong winds, and burial by blowing/accumulating sand. Examples of beach and foredune vegetation of temperate zones include Ammophila arenaria (an invasive species on the west coast of North America), Honckenya peploides, Cakile maritima, and Spartina coarctata.

== Backdune flora ==
Plants which thrive on the broad dune plain and backdune grow together into dense patches termed "dune mats" that hold the dune together. Examples of temperate zone flora of the plain and backdune include Hudsonia tomentosa, Spartina patens, Iva imbricata, and Erigeron glaucus. Introduced species can out compete native plants and disrupt animal life, making them formally "invasive species".

== Shrub stage ==
The above species are herbaceous plants. After they have rooted and developed fully, a second stage, the "shrub stage", can begin. During this phase, larger plants with deeper root systems can be planted. Examples are Empetrum nigrum, Ilex vomitoria, and Vaccinium ovatum. The shrub stage is variable depending on microclimate, and may be influenced the height of the water table, wind and salt spray. The shrub stage may eventually give way to forest or chaparral.

== Coastal management ==
A single beach may be divided into segments with different owners. Gaining agreement among all owners complicates the process of stabilizing the dunes. Without agreement, some parts of the dune may go unplanted, while others host visually appealing plants that do little to stabilize the dune. Inconsistent vegetation, known as a fragmented or decoupled gradient, can create weak points in the dune that limit its effectiveness against floods and even its continued existence.

Publicly owned beaches, found in U.S. states such as California and Hawaii and in other jurisdictions, present the opportunity to systematically manage—or mismanage—beaches and their accompanying dunes.

== Coastal sand dune management ==
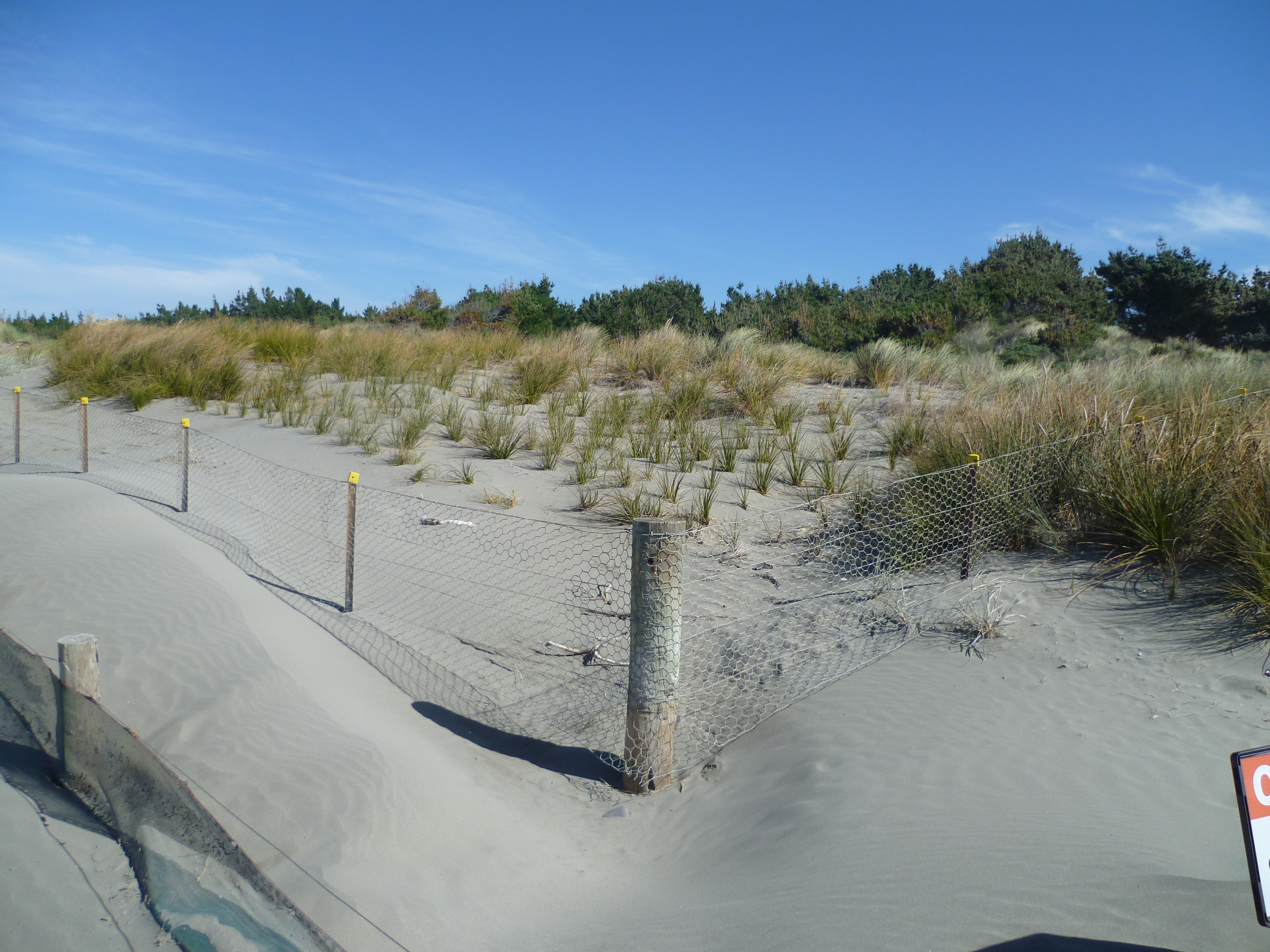
Figure 1: Spencer Park restoration

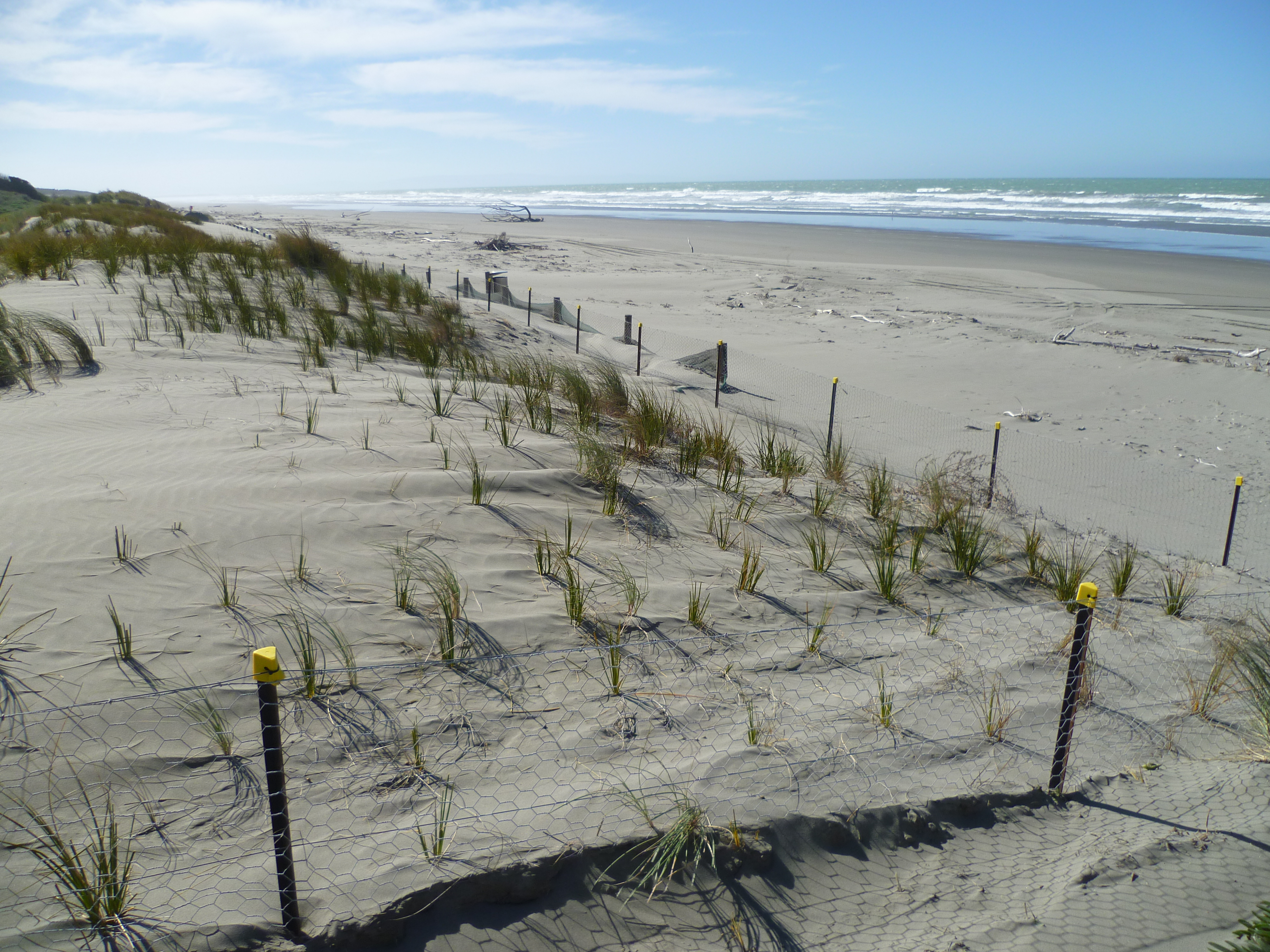
Figure 2: Fencing at Spencer Park

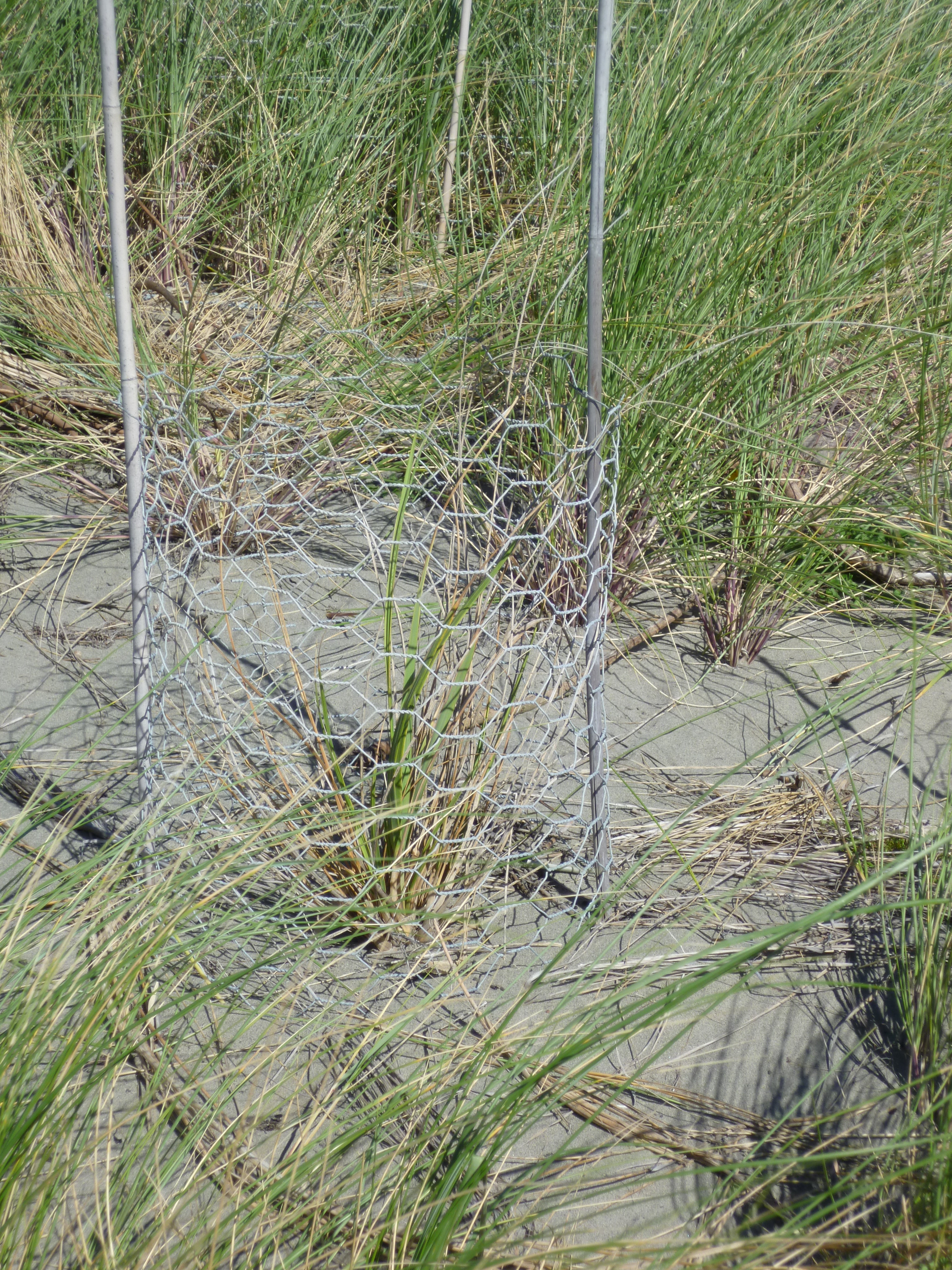
Figure 3: protecting plants with chicken wire

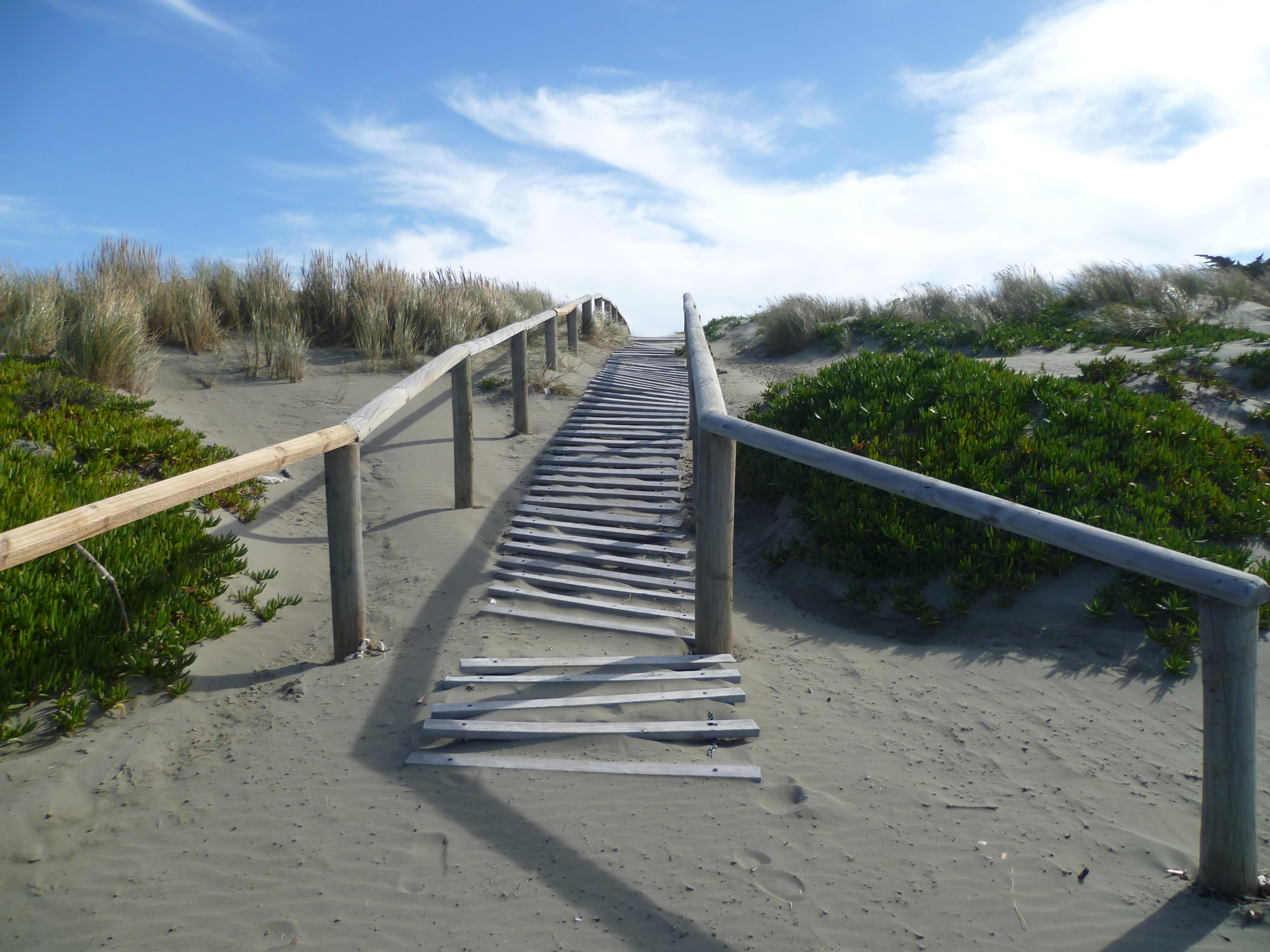
Figure 4: Walkway over New Brighton Sand Dunes

Coastal sand dunes fringe thousands of kilometres of coastline around the world. They are made up of continuous, hummocky hills of sand that are held together by specially adapted sand dune vegetation. See Figure 1. These plants have adaptations that allow them to survive in sand dune habitats, these include adaptations to a moving substrate which covers and uncovers its roots, adaptation to desiccation, to strong winds carrying salt and sand and to wildly changing temperatures. Coastal sand dunes formed during a time of low sea level where sand and sediments on the foreshore became exposed and in conjunction with sufficient winds, this sand was transported up the beach face via a process known as saltation. Once sufficient wind (>15 km/h) mobilises sand particles they become trapped in vegetation or drift wood at the back of the beach, sand then continues to accumulate among the vegetation and over time slowly builds up the dunes we see today. Sand dunes serve an important purpose by protecting inland areas from coastal water intrusion. They are able to absorb the impact and protect inland areas from high energy storms and act as a resilient barrier to the destructive forces of wind and waves.

=== Human impacts ===
It is generally observed that coastal dunes are highly sensitive to any number of human activities. It is also understood that coastal dunes need to have limited interaction with humans in order for their protection and survival. Around the world coastal dunes are eroding and under pressure due to increased sediment loss because of increased coastal human activities. For example, in the last 30 years, mainly because of tourism, nearly 75% of the Mediterranean's coastal dunes have been damaged or destroyed. Human impacts can expand from minor to highly significant adverse effects. Minor effects include pedestrian trampling, constructing footpaths, and off-road vehicle tracks, to the more significant which includes the construction of roads, car parks, houses, the use of sand dunes for ground water extraction, the conversion of sand dunes to land for farming, forestry or waste disposal and sand dune mining. China is a country with a very long coast line that consists of around 1090 km of sand dunes. From the early 1900s to the early 2000s the area of sand dunes has declined by about 70% from 129,000 ha to 39,000 ha. This decline has been mainly due to erosion caused by the depletion of vegetation cover in order to convert sand dunes to land for forestry, farming and urban areas. Loss in vegetation cover exposes sand to the action of wind and leaves sand dunes vulnerable to increased erosion as it is vegetation that binds sand together. The loss of vegetation causes sand to move inland which is a process known as sand encroachment, this process can having damaging effects on inland properties and leaves properties vulnerable to future coastal hazards for example storm surge.

As well as human activities, natural processes operate within coastal dune environments, these processes include events such as storms, floods, sea level change, and sediment supply changes. Coastal dune systems are mainly controlled by a principal natural process called the sediment supply and transport system. This system consists of an offshore zone (sediment bank), transit zone (beach and active foredune) and a resting zone (stable sand dunes). The sediment in this system is supplied by long shore drift predominantly from rivers and from the erosion of cliffs, headlands, other dune systems and when sediment supply is low sand dunes are subject to erosion. Humans affect sediment supply in a number of ways including the damming of rivers, dredging in coastal water and the construction of harbours, all of which depletes sediment supply. They also disrupt the long shore transport of sediment through the construction of piers, marinas or groynes, breakwaters and other hard structures. Excavating, building roads, houses and walkways on coastal dunes or beaches also causes sand dune erosion by disrupting natural sediment processes. Effective management of coastal dune systems must consider natural processes as a normal part of the natural environment as well as controlling human activities and seeking to alter natural processes should be kept at a minimum in order for restoration to be successful.

=== Integrated management ===
Sand dunes are an important part of the coast as they are land's first defence against the forces of the ocean. Because of this, management of sand dunes will focus on the natural authenticity and values of the dunes themselves including flora, fauna, and the ecosystem as a whole. The concept of integrated management can be incorporated into management of coastal sand dunes. This concept is made up of three main aspects:

- Restore and conserve natural processes
- Create conditions for future natural processes
- Develop types of land use that agree with the above

These concepts seek to incorporate natural processes and human activities within coastal dunes systems. Sand dune management issues are related to the nature of sediment, which has no cohesiveness so the influence of wind and sediment supply is an important factor in determining erosion and deposition of dry sand grains .

Sand dune management consists of restoring natural dune systems and processes with the implementation of “soft” technique which includes the cessation of any activity that adversely effects the sediment supply of the dunes, planting vegetation, fencing off sensitive areas, creating dune walkways, and providing information to the public regarding the importance of maintaining stable sand dunes. The concept of “soft” techniques is in contrast to the widely used “hard” techniques which consist of protecting the coast through the construction of concrete sea walls, revetments, gabions, groynes and offshore break waters. The problem with using these “hard” engineering methods is that they only provide temporary protection against ocean hazards and each "hard" method produces an “end effect” that causes erosion problems to adjacent coastal areas. This is why the implementation of “soft” techniques in dune restoration should be used more widely in coastal protection as they provide natural, long term protection with no adverse effect to adjacent coastal areas. The use of soft techniques can be seen in many coastal protection projects around the world including many in New Zealand.

=== Restoration and protection ===
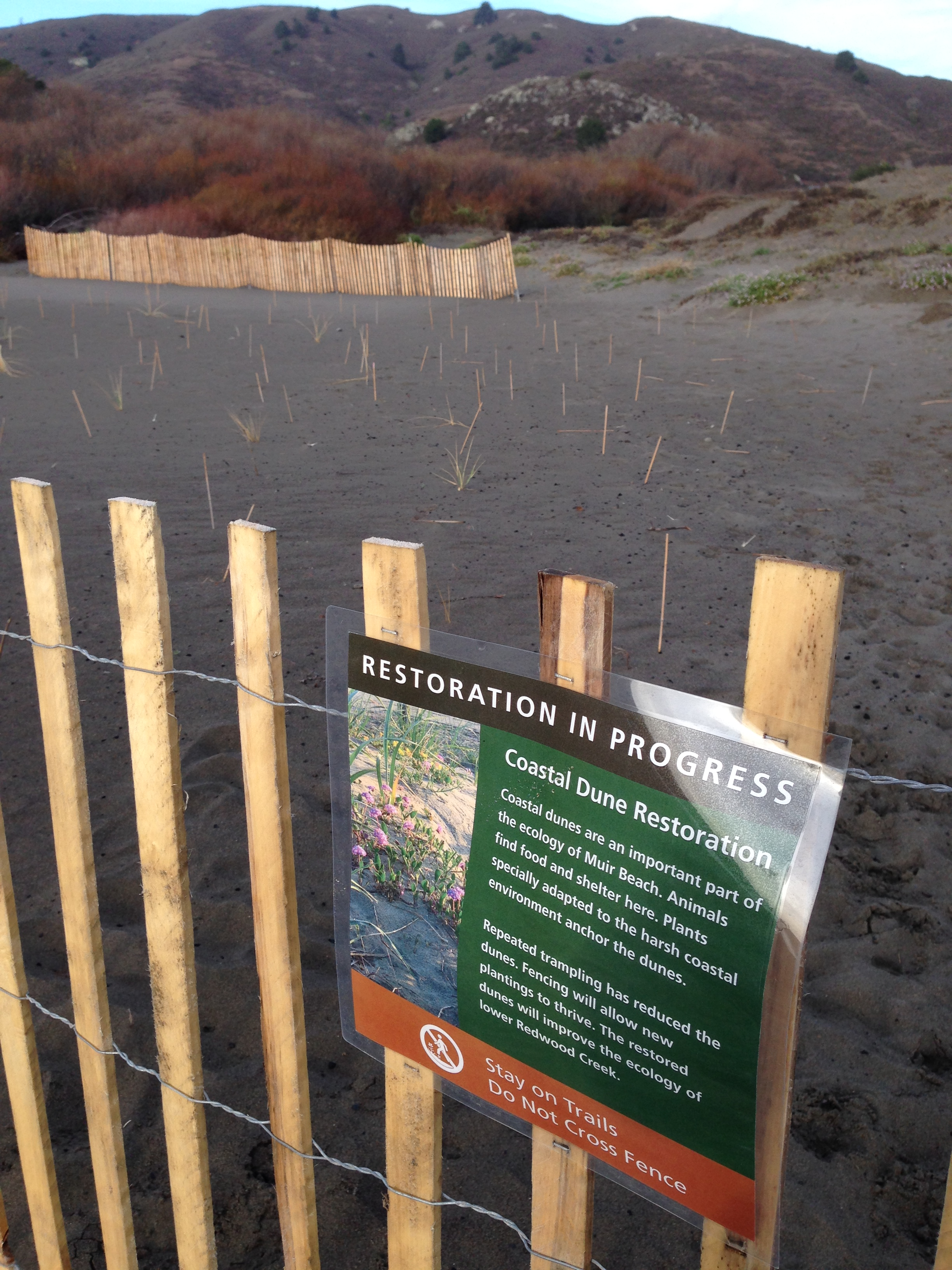
Restoration in progress on Muir Beach dunes

One of the first things a coastal manager must look for when establishing sand dune management is to ascertain the main cause of sediment loss and from there, make decisions on how to minimise the cause and how to restore sand dunes appropriately. In New Zealand the main cause of dune erosion has been the loss of sand vegetation and this means that sand dune management consists primarily of stabilizing dune systems through the “soft” technique of replanting and protecting native dune vegetation. It is advised that dunes should not be restored with the planting of exotic species and managers should aim to only use species indigenous to an area, originally New Zealand used exotic, fast growing dune vegetation called marram grass to stabilize eroding sand dunes. It was later discovered that this exotic species created very high, steep sand dunes that were increasingly susceptible to New Zealand's high storm energy climate. It also became apparent that the native New Zealand dune vegetation was out-competed by this introduced species which caused issues biologically. At present, there is a large push to eradicate marram grass as it is now classed as a pest species in New Zealand, and coastal managers encourage the planting of the two indigenous species, pingao (Desmoschoenus spiralis) and Spinifex sericeus as these two species create low angle, strong, stable dunes.

The management of dune restoration projects includes planting vegetation successfully. Merely scattering and leaving seeds over sandy areas is perceived as a potential waste as strong winds can blow seeds away. Planting of nurseries should be conducted in the hollows of any present sand hills or in depressions of sandy areas. Seeds should be planted in moist conditions and should be lightly covered by a layer of sand and large mature grass individuals should be planted in deep holes with the tops of the plants cut short so as to reduce wind resistance.

Planting of sand dune vegetation alone does not entirely restore or protect sand dunes from human impacts. Seedlings need to be protected from human trampling, which is done mainly by fencing off newly planted areas. Fencing also acts as another way of trapping and accumulating sand among the dunes and can also act as protection against strong winds. Figure two shows an area of newly planted vegetation at Spencer Park Beach, New Zealand. It shows that fencing protects plants from trampling and figure three shows how small fencing using chicken wire can encourage plants to grow. In addition to erecting fences to protect sand dune vegetation, the establishment of walkways will protect developed sand dunes from degrading again over time. These walkways provide access to beaches for the public that does not require pedestrians to cross the dunes themselves thus preventing damage. Figure four shows a typical walkway at New Brighton Beach, New Zealand. The walkway itself is built to go over the sand dunes as opposed to straight through them, in order to maintain the continuity and strength of the dunes.

=== The public ===
Because sand dunes and beaches are extremely popular for outdoor recreation, the success of restoration and dune management depends a great deal on the information available and understanding of the public. This is important because not all aspects of sand dune management are obvious or important to the public if they do not understand why management is necessary e.g. stabilization. There are many ways in which information can be provided to the public including the erection of panels at entrances to dune walkways, leaflets, brochures, maps and council workers who can talk to the public about the importance of protecting sand dunes. Figure five shows a photo of a panel put up at Spencer Park by the Christchurch City Council indicating that people should not walk on the area, as it is an area for sand dune restoration. It needs to be re-iterated that sand dune restoration and protection is in the public's best interest as the loss of sediment on any coast line leads to the erosion of beaches, which in turn leads to a loss of recreational value of many coastlines. The public needs to be aware of the role that sand dunes play in coastal protection, because without public support, coastal sand dune management is virtually impossible.

== See also ==
- Aeolian processes
- Arid Forest Research Institute
- Beach evolution
- Blowout (geomorphology)
- Coastal erosion
- Coastal geography
- Fowlers Bay, South Australia
- Integrated coastal zone management
- Longshore drift
- Sand dune ecology
- Sandhill
- Vecekrugas dune
