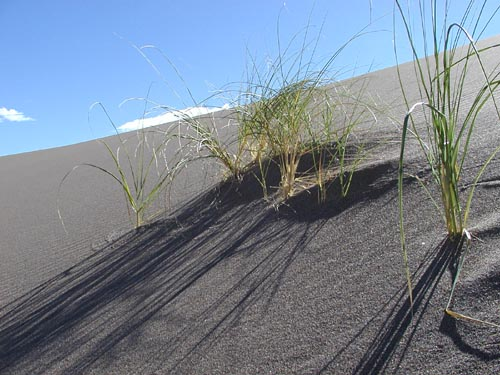
- Blowout grass on a sand dune

Scientific classification
- Kingdom: Plantae
- Clade: Tracheophytes
- Clade: Angiosperms
- Clade: Monocots
- Clade: Commelinids
- Order: Poales
- Family: Poaceae
- Genus: Redfieldia; Vasey
- Species: R. flexuosa

Binomial name
- Redfieldia flexuosa (Thurb. ex A. Gray) Vasey

Synonyms
- Graphephorum flexuosum Thurb. ex A. Gray

= Redfieldia =

Genus of grasses

Redfieldia, known as blowout grass, is a monotypic genus in the grass family (Poaceae). The sole species, Redfieldia flexuosa, is native to sandhills in the western and central United States. The plants grow in small clusters, protecting each other from the harsh desert conditions.

== Description ==
The flowering culms are 0.5–1 m (1 ft 8 in – 3 ft 3 in) tall. The inflorescence is an open panicle with solitary spikelets on narrow pedicels. Each spikelet has between two and six florets. The glumes have pointed tips and are narrower than the fertile lemma. The lemma has three veins and hairy margins. The glumes are persistent after fruiting. It spreads with elongated rhizomes.

== Distribution and habitat ==
According to the United States Natural Resources Conservation Service (NRCS), blowout grass is found in thirteen states, including Arizona, Colorado, Illinois, Kansas, Montana, North Dakota, Nebraska, New Mexico, Oklahoma, South Dakota, Texas, Utah, and Wyoming.

== See also ==
- Blowout (geology)
- Sand dune stabilization
