= Frank Blew =

Welsh footballer

Personal information
- Full name: Frank William Elford Blew
- Date of birth: 1902
- Place of birth: Wrexham, Wales
- Date of death: 1968 (aged 65–66)
- Height: 5 ft 6 in (1.68 m)
- Positions: Left-back; centre-forward

Senior career*
Years	Team	Apps	(Gls)
1921–1922	Wrexham	5	(1)
1922–1923	Llandudno	?	(?)
1923–1924	Wrexham	7	(0)
1924–1925	Llandudno	?	(?)
1925–1927	Wrexham	16	(0)
Total		28	(0)

International career
	Wales Amateur	?	(?)
- * Club domestic league appearances and goals

Frank William Elford Blew (1902–1968) was a Welsh footballer who played as either a left-back or centre-forward for Wrexham and Llandudno in the 1920s. Blew also played for the Wales Amateur team. His father was Horace Blew, also a footballer who played at full-back for Wrexham, Manchester United, Manchester City and the Welsh national team.

Born in Wrexham, Blew began his career with his local club, Wrexham in 1921. He made five appearances in his first season, scoring one goal, before moving on to Llandudno in 1922. He returned to Wrexham a year later, but made seven appearances before going back to Llandudno in 1924. In 1925, he returned to Wrexham for the last time, making 16 appearances over two seasons before retiring in 1927.

After his retirement, Blew played a role in scouting young players for Wrexham, including Arfon Griffiths, who later played for Arsenal and made more than 550 appearances for Wrexham.
