= Blow job (disambiguation) =

Blow job or blowjob, a slang word for fellatio, is an act of oral stimulation of a penis.

Blow job may also refer to:

== Film and television ==
- Blow Job (1964 film), silent film, directed by Andy Warhol
  - Blow Job #2, original title for a 1966 film sequel to Blow Job above by Andy Warhol, later renamed Eating Too Fast
- Blow Job (1980 film), Italian film
- "Blow Job", title of 2nd episode in season 7 of Canadian TV series Kevin Spencer (See List of episodes)
- "Blow Job Betty", title of the 2nd episode in season 1 of German comedy television series Dr. Psycho – Die Bösen, die Bullen, meine Frau und ich

== Music ==
- "Blow Job", a song by Blink 182 from their 2000 live album The Mark, Tom and Travis Show (The Enema Strikes Back!)
- "Blow Job", an interlude in rap duo 8Ball & MJG's album Ridin High
- "Blowjob (Mildred Pierce)", a song by Sonic Youth in the deluxe edition of their 1990 album Goo
- "Blow Jobs", a song by GG Allin from his 1986 album E.M.F.
- "Blow Job (It's Hard to be President)", a single by Musical Reporters, produced by Maurice Engelen

== Other media ==
- Blow Job, a 1997 novel by Stewart Home
- Blow Job (The Three Little Boys), a work by Damian Loeb
- Blow-Job, a 1971 play by Snoo Wilson
