= Blowout (geomorphology) =

Depressions in a sand dune ecosystem caused by the removal of sediments by wind

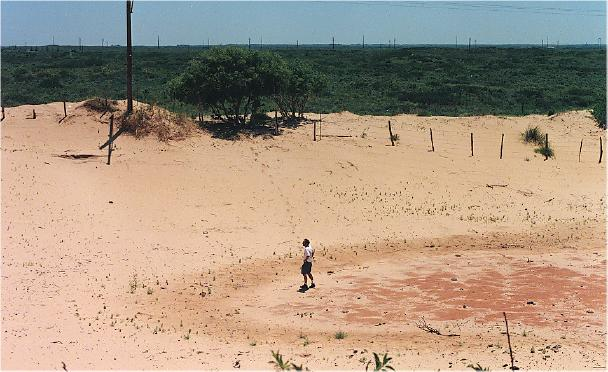
Blowout located 6.5 km south of Earth, Texas (1996)

Blowouts are sandy depressions in a sand dune ecosystem (psammosere) caused by the removal of sediments by wind.

Commonly found in coastal settings and margins of arid areas, blowouts tend to form when wind erodes patches of bare sand on stabilized vegetated dunes. Generally, blowouts do not form on actively flowing dunes because the dunes need to be bound to some extent, for instance by plant roots. These depressions usually start on the higher parts of stabilized dunes on account of the more considerable desiccation and disturbances occurring there, which allows for greater surface drag and sediment entrainment when the sand is bare. Most of the time, exposed areas become quickly re-vegetated before they can become blowouts and expand; however, when circumstances are favourable, wind erosion can gouge the exposed surface and create a tunneling effect which increases local wind speed. A depression may then develop until it hits a non-erodible substrate, or morphology limits it. The eroded substances climb the steep slopes of the depression and become deposited on the downwind side of the blowout which can form a dune that covers vegetation and lead to a larger depression; a process that helps create parabolic dunes.

Note that volcanic features that take the form of depressions are sometimes informally called blowouts, such as "The Blowout" (a lava lake) or "Big Blowout Butte" in central Idaho.

== Vegetation ==
Although there is a wide variety of vegetation that live in dune environments around the world, most plant species play a key role in determining whether blowouts will form or not by the result of how strong their protective skins can suppress erosion and how capable some pioneer species can repress further erosion if a dune becomes exposed.

Protective skin

In the first case, the primary objective for the protective skin is to resist disturbances that will form open exposures and create blowouts. To prevent erosion, vegetation helps reduce shear stress by covering the surface and mechanically binding soil together. The protective skin is composed of vegetation that is above and below ground surface and decomposing plant litter. Additionally, the protective skin can also be composed of a wide variety of species that could constitute environments like grasslands and forest. However, if the climate changes, it can directly influence the health of the vegetation, which can make the skin fragile; nevertheless, the rate of change may take some time and may be different for stabilized dunes in different environments.

Pioneer species

Once disturbances destroy a portion of the protective skin, the exposure can expand and erode other portions of the skin; however, some vegetation, such as pioneer species, can settle in an opening and prevent any further expansion and deflation. Even though a few plants species can be classed as colonizers, these plants tend to withstand high rates of sediment deposition and poor nutrient conditions in the blowout. Moreover, if a blowout does form, the deposited material that travels out of the depression can either continue to become deposited at a greater rate than pioneer vegetation can grow, or become stabilized again. Mostly due to changes in the climate, colonizer species heavily rely on conditions of the environment, which can change dramatically unlike the vegetation in the protective skin.

Coastal sand dunes are found just inland from a beach, and are formed as the wind blows dry sand inland beyond the beach. It follows that this can only happen when there is an area of reasonably flat land inland from the beach. In time, this rather inhospitable surface will be colonised by pioneer species. These species (e.g. marram grass) will stabilise the dunes and prevent them moving any more. The process of plant succession will eventually see these dunes converted to woodland (depending on the climate) and a mature soil will have formed.

Blowouts provide an important habitat for flora and fauna.

== Disturbances ==
Disturbances are general phrases which define a cause that creates an exposure in the vegetative skin to eventually form a blowout formation. Rather than being described as events, disturbances are terms which describe the rate at which breaches create an opening and expand, yet there are numerous types of disturbances that can penetrate the protective vegetative skin. Despite the fact that many factors could influence blowout formations, disturbances usually have three characteristics which determine if a depression will form and expand. The first property states that disturbances must have a penetration magnitude greater than the toughness of the protective vegetative skin. Simply put, if the breach cannot remove the shielding vegetation, then wind erosion cannot create a depression in stabilized dunes. The second property asserts that sediment transportation in an exposure would be limited if exposure's spatial coverage is too small. Presuming that the opening is very compacted, the fetch length would also be very cramped which does not allow much sediment particles to be moved out of the exposure. Lastly, the third property exclaims that spatial configuration of the disturbed openings greatly influences the fetch length and sediment transportation in the exposure. If there were numerous disturbed patches that borderline each other in a downwind direction, wind erosion may be capable of removing and transporting large amounts of sediment particles, which could create blowouts. Thus, although the scale of the disturbances does assist in blowout formation, these characteristics generally help dictate if Aeolian processes can create a depression or not.

== Airflow dynamics and morphology ==
Once an exposure has been spawned, the morphology of the blowout depends on the interaction of wind speed and direction with the stabilized dune's vegetation and topography. There is a wide range of blowout types that form depending on these factors; however, the scientific community mostly utilizes two types of blowouts: trough and saucer. Although there is no obvious reason why one type is formed rather than another in a particular region, saucer blowouts generally have semicircular and saucer shapes while trough blowouts have more elongated shapes with deep deflation basins and steeper slopes. Nevertheless, both types of blowouts have structures that can affect wind flow within the basin.

In troughs, the structure's topography can accelerate flows and form jets that result in maximum erosion along the deflation basin floor and laterally expand the slopes of the blowout. Additionally, when the wind flows on top of the blowout's lateral walls, sediment transport is at its maximum in the middle axis of the trough depositional lobe, leading to formation of a parabolic dune. Although some studies like Hesp and Pringle (2001) noted that wind flow that was oblique to the blowouts’ orientation became pulled into the depression due to a zone of low pressure at the deflation basin and was steered parallel to the orientation of the trough blowout. However, in Smyth, Jackson, and Cooper’s study (2014), little evidence supported that wind flow was being steered along the axis of the blowout, but rather the flow remained constant in the direction that it was flowing before or showed other characteristics like turbulent separated flows.

Saucer blowouts indicate a deceleration of wind flow along the deflation basin as the structure widens over time by reversing flows eroding the sides and expanding upwind. Due to rapid deceleration, saucers tend to form short, wide, radial depositional slopes. When wind flow enters a saucer shape blowout, the wind speed decreases upon entering the blowout and accelerates at the downwind side of the formation. A zone of separation develops along the lee slope as the wind enters the blowout and decrease in speed, yet it accelerates again as it re-attaches at the basin and flow up to the depositional lobe, where sand becomes evacuated.

Even though they are more influences blowout structures have on their morphology, both types basically tend to have deflation basins eroded until they reach their non-erodible base level. A study conducted by Hesp (1982) indicates that depositional length is not correlated with the eroded depth but rather the blowout width. In other words, as the depositional lobe increases, the blowout width also increases by a ratio of 1:2 to 1:3 in saucer blowouts and 1:4 in trough blowouts.

== See also ==
- Aeolian processes – Processes due to wind activity
- Sand dune stabilization – Coastal management practice
- Redfieldia, also known as Blowout grass – Genus of grasses
- Médanos
- Sand dune ecology – Interactions of sand dunes
- Sandhills (Nebraska) – Temperate grasslands, savannas, and shrublands ecoregion of Nebraska, United States
- Yardang – Streamlined aeolian landform
