= B.L.O.W. =

Single by Tory Lanez
- Released: September 18, 2015
- Genre: Hip hop; R&B
- Length: 4:40
- Label: Mad Love; Interscope
- Songwriters: Daystar Peterson; Daniel Gonzalez; Sergio Romero
- Producers: Play Picasso; Romero

Tory Lanez singles chronology
"Initiation" (2015)	"B.L.O.W." (2015)	"Drifting" (2015)

"B.L.O.W." is a song by Canadian rapper Tory Lanez. The song was released on September 18, 2015 by Mad Love Records and Interscope Records. The song was produced by Play Picasso and Sergio Romero.

== Music video ==
The song's accompanying music video premiered on September 18, 2015, on Lanez's Vevo account on YouTube. Since its release, the video has received over 21 million views. Matthew Trammell of The Fader wrote "Lanez is tallying detractors, ogling dudes and ex-girls alike. Draped white sheets float around like ghosts of yesterday's friendships, before mile-high models tease the new possibilities of tomorrow".

== Critical reception ==
"B.L.O.W." received positive reviews from music critics. IHEARTTART of Hip Hop Canada writes in a positive review, "He don't even care about the ladies as much anymore. Tory is at this point where he's over the novelty of getting girls. He doesn't want to praise the pussy anymore because he feels like girls are just trying to get at his money. So he repents, instead". Hot New Hip Hop's Rose Lilah opined "The single is sinister and foreboding, as Tory basically taunts us with the fact that he's about to blow up. He plays with the breadth and depth of his vocals, and eases into both singing and rapping". Richardine Bartee of The Source called the song a "coming-of-age moment... the transition from newbie to expert".
