= Naphthylamine =

Naphthylamine or aminonaphthalene can refer to either of two isomeric chemical compounds:

- 1-Naphthylamine (1-aminonaphthalene)
- 2-Naphthylamine (2-aminonaphthalene)
