= Blow (surname) =

Blow is the surname of several people, including:

- Charles M. Blow, (born 1970), an American journalist and columnist for The New York Times.
- David Mervyn Blow (1931–2004), an influential British biophysicist
- Detmar Blow (1867–1939), a British architect of the early 20th century
- Godfrey Blow (born 1948), an artist based in Kalamunda, Western Australia
- Henry Taylor Blow (1817–1876), a U.S. Representative and Ambassador from Missouri
- Isabella Blow (1958–2007), a British magazine editor and international style icon
- John Blow (1649–1708), an English composer and organist
- Jonathan Blow (born 1971), a video game programmer and designer
- Kurtis Blow (born 1951), an American rapper
- Sandra Blow (1925–2006), an English painter
- Susan Blow (1843–1916), an American educator
- Thomas Blow (1862–1932), a provincial level politician from Alberta, Canada

== See also ==
- Blew (surname)
