= Blow Up (web series) =

French web series

- Logo
- Genre: Film magazine; Supercut
- Created by: Luc Lagier
- Directed by: Luc Lagier
- Narrated by: Luc Lagier and others
- Country of origin: France
- Original language: French

Production
- Producer: Jean-Stéphane Michaux
- Production company: Camera Lucida Productions

Original release
- Network: Arte
- Release: November 2010 – present

Blow Up is a French online film magazine in the form of a web series created and directed by Luc Lagier and produced by Jean-Stéphane Michaux. Episodes consist of a supercut of excerpts from various films, usually including voice-over commentary. The series debuted on the network Arte in mid-November 2010 and is available on Arte's website and on YouTube.

== Overview ==
External videos
- "Le Bus au cinéma" (transl. "The Bus in cinema"), an example of a Blow Up episode in the "Top 5" format
- "Tree of Life", an example of a Blow Up episode in the "Carte blanche" and "Recut" formats, made by Johanna Vaude, is composed of excerpts from The Tree of Life, a 2011 film directed by Terrence Malick.

Each episode of Blow Up is a supercut of similarly themed excerpts from various films. For example, one of the episodes, which is about buses in film, features about 100 film excerpts involving buses, edited together into about 17 minutes of video. In most episodes, someone, usually the series's director Luc Lagier, provides voice-over commentary in a deadpan manner. Episodes range in length from 4 to 20 minutes.

Episodes come in the following formats:

- "Top 5" episodes, such as the aforementioned bus episode, are themed around a specific object or concept. These episodes conclude with a ranking of the top five film scenes that involve that theme.
- "C'est quoi ?" (transl. "What is?") episodes cover a specific actor.
- "B.O. de films" (transl. "Film soundtracks") episodes, hosted by Thierry Jousse, cover the history of film soundtracks.
- "Bio express" episodes cover a specific filmmaker.
- "Génériques de films" (transl. "Film credits") episodes, hosted by Alexandre Tylski, cover the history of film credits.
- "Face à l'Histoire" (transl. "Facing History") episodes, hosted by Frédéric Bas, cover film's relation to history.
- "Les Introuvables (ou presque)" (transl. "The Unfindables (or almost)") episodes, hosted by Trufo, cover rare and obscure films.
- "Zapping" episodes consist of a short summary of a single film.
- "Carte blanche" episodes are made by other people in the French film industry who Lagier invites on to the series, including Laetitia Masson, Johanna Vaude, Benoît Forgeard, Dominique Gonzalez-Foerster, Alain Cavalier, Jean-Philippe Toussaint, Xavier Giannoli, Bertrand Mandico, Bertrand Bonello, and Jean-Paul Civeyrac.
- "Recut" episodes lack the usual voice-over.

== Production ==
Blow Up was conceptualized by film critic and self-described cinephile Luc Lagier of the Franco-German television network Arte when Joël Ronez of Arte's web division suggested that he create a series similar to a blog or online magazine. Arte, which had no video series about film at the time and wanted one, granted full creative freedom to Lagier and his producer Jean-Stéphane Michaux.

Lagier, who had been editor-in-chief of an Arte magazine about short films called Court-circuit (transl. Short-circuit) from 2000 to 2006, did not want Blow Up to be journalistic like his previous work had been. He has cited director Alain Resnais's use of juxtaposition of media, such as the integration of popular music in his 1997 film Same Old Song, as inspiration for Blow Up's composition.

Blow Up was initially planned to be named after Playtime, a 1967 film directed by Jacques Tati. Instead, it was named after Blowup, a 1966 film directed by Michelangelo Antonioni in which the main character thinks that he has discovered a murder in an enlargement of a film photograph. Lagier saw Blow Up as likewise involving the inspection of film to find that which is hidden.

Lagier's inspiration for episodes' themes sometimes comes from current events. After choosing a theme, he tries to compile at least 100 scenes, by remembering films he has seen before, consulting his DVD collection, and reading film magazines. Lagier is uninterested in using the internet for this, because he wants Blow Up to feature scenes that have not already been widely circulated online. After this process, which takes about a month, the voice-over is recorded, and an editor assembles the final product. The team typically works on several episodes at the same time.

== Release ==
In mid-November 2010, Blow Up debuted on Arte's website. It is also available on YouTube. Typically, two or three new episodes release per week.

For six months in 2014, Arte gave the series about 4 minutes of airtime on terrestrial television. Some formats, such as "Bio express", were short enough for this timeslot; but others, such as "Top 5", were too long. Lagier has commented that he prefers the freedom of the online medium for the series.

== See also ==
- Collage film
- Mashup (video)
