= Horace Blew =

Welsh footballer (1878-1957)

Personal information
- Full name: Horace Elford Blew
- Date of birth: 1878
- Place of birth: Esclusham, Wales
- Date of death: 1957 (aged 78–79)
- Place of death: Esclusham, Wales
- Position: Full-back

Youth career
- Grove Park School
- Wrexham Old Boys
- Rhostyllen

Senior career*
| Years | Team | Apps | (Gls) |
| 1898–1911 | Wrexham | | |
| ?–1906 | Bury | ? | |
| 1906 | Manchester United | 1 | (0) |
| 1906 | Manchester City | 1 | (0) |
| 1906– | Wrexham Victoria | | |
| 1909–1910 | Brymbo Victoria | | |

International career
| | Wales | 22 | |
- * Club domestic league appearances and goals

Horace Elford Blew (1878 – 1957) was a Welsh international footballer who played at full-back. He represented Wales on 22 occasions despite playing in The Football League only twice in his career. He also represented the Welsh amateur side.

Blew played for Wrexham, and then Bury, although he did not play a League game for The Shakers. In March 1906, he transferred to Manchester United, but only played one game for them before moving to Manchester City in September 1906. He also appeared for Wrexham Victoria and Brymbo Victoria.

He made his Wales debut in March 1899, and was an automatic selection for the team between 1902 and 1909, missing only five games in that time. Due to his services to football, he was awarded a testimonial in 1908.

In 1905 he is recorded as being the tenant of the Raglan Arms, Lambpit Street, Wrexham, the Bowling Green, Penybryn in 1916, whilst also being recorded as the owner of the Griffin Inn, Ponciau in 1918.

After retiring from football, he was elected to Wrexham Council in May 1919, as a Conservative candidate. He was also listed as an auctioneer and valuer. Blew was Mayor of Wrexham in 1923. His son, Frank, was also a footballer who played for Wrexham and Llandudno.

Horace, whose only appearance with Manchester United in the 1905–06 season was in an away match on Good Friday against Chelsea, won a medal for this one game. The point won in that drawn game helped United to win promotion.
