= Blow (drink) =

Energy drink

Blow is a controversial energy drink notable for its use of drug culture in its marketing, such as the name of the drink itself, which is a slang term for cocaine. Rather than being sold in liquid form, it was distributed as vials of white powder similar in appearance to cocaine, which were to be mixed with water or any other beverage, and can be bought in large Styrofoam containers made to resemble cocaine bricks. Additional packages on the drink's website were referred to by names such as "The Recreational User Pack" or "The Fiender's Hook-Up" for various quantities. Cases on the website also included free stickers, tattoos, or shirts sporting the brand's logo. The powder has also been distributed along with a mirror and imitation credit card to simulate the "cutting" of cocaine.

Blow's producers have come under fire from parents and other concerned parties, who allege that its marketing targets adolescents and glorifies illegal drug abuse, citing the use of rock music and women in seductive poses on the drink's website, as well as the inclusion of a Myspace link.

== FDA Action ==
On January 31, 2008, the Food and Drug Administration sent a Warning Letter to Blow. According to the FDA, Blow is a drug under 21 U.S.C. §321(g)(l) of the Federal Food, Drug and Cosmetic Act and violates the Act because it was not approved by the FDA.
