= Blowback (forensics) =

Vacuum effect when a firearm is discharged

In forensics, blowback is the vacuum effect created in the barrel of a firearm when it is discharged.

After the weapon is fired, air races into the barrel once the bullet has left the muzzle. This vacuum can pull in trace amounts of materials from the environment.

Police can use blood and tissue which have entered a gun barrel through blowback in an investigation.
