= Ben McCrow =

British punk and death metal vocalist (born 1981)

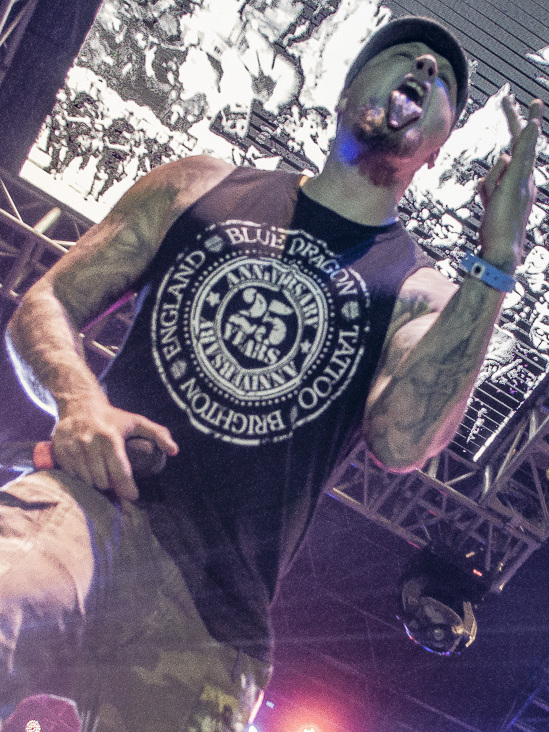
McCrow with Extreme Noise Terror in Medellín, Colombia, 2015

Ben McCrow (born 1981 in Hounslow, London, England) is a British punk and death metal vocalist known for his work with Extreme Noise Terror, Gorerotted and The Rotted.

== Discography ==
=== With Extreme Noise Terror ===
==== Studio albums ====
- Extreme Noise Terror (album) (Willowtip Records/MCR, 2015)

==== Singles and splits ====
- Chained and Crazed (Quagga Curious, 2015)
- Extreme Noise Terror / The Dwarves (Lowlife Records, 2016)
- Daily Holocaust (MCR Japan, 2017)

=== With The Rotted ===
==== Studio albums ====
- Get Dead or Die Trying (Metal Blade Records, 2008)
- Anarchogram (Anarchogram Industries, 2010)
- Ad Nauseam (Candlelight Records, 2011)

==== Singles and splits ====
- Apathy in the UK (Hammerheart Records, 2011)
- Rotted F*cking Earth (Anarchogram Industries, 2013)
- The Rotted / Collision (Hammerheart Records, 2014)

=== With Gorerotted ===
==== Studio albums ====
- Mutilated in Minutes (Relapse Records/IBD Records/Dead Again Records, 2001. Reissued by Hammerheart Records in 2012)
- Only Tools and Corpses (Metal Blade Records, 2003)
- A New Dawn for the Dead (Metal Blade Records, 2005)

==== Singles and splits ====
- Split Your Guts Vol. 1 (with Gronibard and Gruesome Stuff Relish) (Deepsend Records, 2002)

=== Other appearances ===
- Ted Maul – White Label (Raise The Game Records, 2006) - vocals on "The High Commissioner"
- Rex Shachath – Revocation Of The Blood Elect (Great Dane Records, 2015) - vocals on "Within The Temple Of Disgust"
- Foetal Juice – Masters Of Absurdity (Grindscene, 2016) - vocals on "Leachate King"
