= Ad nauseam (disambiguation) =

Ad nauseam is a Latin term for argument or other discussion that has continued 'to [the point of] nausea'.

Ad Nauseam may also refer to:

- Ad Nauseam (Dog Fashion Disco album), 2015
- Ad Nauseam (The Rotted album), 2011
- AdNauseam, a browser extension that blocks and simulates clicks on ads
- Ad Nauseam, a 1995 album by The Tiger Lillies
- "Ad Nauseam", a song by Fad Gadget from the 1984 album Gag
- Derek and Clive Ad Nauseam, an album by Peter Cook and Dudley Moore
- A 1980s band with Jon Poole
