= Africa Oyé =

Festival of African music in the United Kingdom

- Status: On Hiatus for 2025
- Frequency: Annually
- Locations: Sefton Park, Liverpool
- Inaugurated: 1992; 2002 (current venue)
- Next event: June 2026

Africa Oyé is an annual festival held annual in Sefton Park, in Liverpool it is the largest celebration of live African music and culture in the UK. Originally a smaller, multi-venue event, Oyé now attracts over fifty thousand people every June to Liverpool's Sefton Park. The next Africa Oyé is set for June 2026, after the organisers announced a hiatus for 2025.

The festival showcases new and established African and Caribbean artists, plus musicians from across the diaspora whilst celebrating various aspects of the same cultures. Oyé has also been known to programme music from South America and the diaspora, with Salsa, Soca and Reggae proving popular additions to the festival.

Africa Oyé is a non-profit organisation and registered charity. Entrance to the festival is free of charge, with the festival being partially funded by the Arts Council England North West and Liverpool City Council, in addition to donations from the public, sponsorship, advertising, in kind support and the revenue generated from pitched traders, merchandise and the Oyé beer tent. The introduction of the Trenchtown area that provided music to the people around the bar was a huge success. The more recent introduction of a second DJ stage, the Freetown area and the Oyé zone have also proven popular. There are over 100 stalls in the surrounding Oyé Village, selling a broad range of world foods, fashion and cultural experiences.

Africa Oyé has one live music stage, hosting UK débuts for artists such as Tinariwen and Ba Cissoko. The festival has also attracted a wealth of international artists to the wider Liverpool area, including Bonga, Luciano, Baaba Maal and Max Romeo. A wide range of DJs can also perform throughout the weekend at the Trenchtown and Freetown stages.

A recent independent Social Economic Impact Study outlined the many effects that Africa Oyé has on the Liverpudlian community. Besides Oyé's general efforts to further cultural understanding in Merseyside, the festival brought in £1.3 million to the Liverpool economy in 2011.. As one of the earliest festivals in the UK calendar, Oyé occurs in the latter half of June. The festival has no authorised camping area, so accommodation for artists and audience alike is sought among Liverpool's many local hotels.

== History ==
Beginning in 1992 as a series of small gigs in Liverpool's city centre, the event has consistently grown in size and popularity, forcing a move in 2002 to its present home in Liverpool's picturesque Sefton Park. 2009 saw Oyé attract an audience of over 20,000 people, increasing to over 50,000 in 2010 and 2011. The festival was briefly a ticketed (£5) event in 2011 This was to cover the cost of enclosing the event, a precaution enforced by Liverpool City Council following the large numbers of attendance in 2010. However, after extensive discussions between Oyé's organisers and the council, the decision was reversed and Oyé continued to be a free and unfenced festival.

2017 was the 25th anniversary of Africa Oyé and saw an estimated footfall of 80,000.

In 2020, Africa Oyé launched Nyumbani. Taking its name from the Swahili word for 'at home,' this was a new online series of original concerts, interviews, documentaries and DJ sets.

In 2022, the festival celebrated its 30th anniversary with a year-round programme of concerts and events, including performances from WITCH, The Dur Dur Band, Vieux Farka Toure and many more.

2023 saw the busiest single day of the festival's 30+ year history, on the Saturday.

2024 was Oye's busiest ever festival weekend.

== Health and participation ==
2010 began The Decade of Health and Well Being in the Liverpool region. With this in mind Oyé introduced The Health, Learning, and Participation Zone at the Africa Oyé festival, featuring activities such as:

- African and Caribbean dance workshops by Movema.
- Drumming and Percussion Workshops with local community group Beatlife and Glastonbury's Chai Chapel.
- Guitar Workshops.
- Vocal coaching.
- Capoeira Brazilian Martial Arts performances and demonstrations.
- A mobile climbing wall.
- Holistic therapies.
- African massages.
- Info stalls about health and well-being.

These additions remained in place for each festival thereafter. These events take place in a designated area of the festival, with its own PA system, marquee(s), performance area, platforms and risers for public viewing and participation.

2020 saw the 10 year anniversary of The Decade of Health and Well Being.

== The Oyé Village ==
The Oyé Village is a phrase used to collectively describe the growing number of stalls at the festival. With over 100 stalls, it features food, arts and crafts from around the world, plus children's entertainment drum workshops, funfair bouncy castles and face painting, and The Oyé Inn; Oye's on site bar, as well as the Oye Active Zone.

== Notable artists ==
- Freddie McGregor
- Frankie Paul
- Andrew Tosh
- Michael Rose (Mykal Rose)
- Femi Kuti
- Baaba Maal
- Rebecca Malope
- Habib Koite
- The Morgan Family Heritage
- The Soul Brothers
- Thomas Mapfumo
- Luciano
- The Gangbé Brass Band
- Tiken Jah Fakoly
- La Excelencia
- Culture
- Misty in Roots
- Kanda Bongo Man
- Marcia Griffiths
- Fatoumata Diawara
- Tinariwen
- Osibisa
- Bonga
- Pat Thomas and Kwashibu Area Band
- Max Romeo
- Andy Palacio
- Akala
- Horace Andy
- Wesli
- Jah9 and The Dub Treatment
- Rocky Dawuni
- Inner Circle
- Lura
- Oumou Sangare
- Fuse ODG
- Julian Marley
- Les Amazones d'Afrique

== Press and awards ==
Africa Oyé has appeared in The Times' top 50 UK Festivals, Songlines' Top UK Summer Festivals for the past 10 years and the Telegraph's 100 Best Festivals in Britain 2011. Oyé has also been shortlisted for Best Medium Sized Festival in 2011, 2013, 2015, 2018 and 2019 at the UK Festival awards, been nominated for ‘The Grass Roots Festival Award’, ‘Family Festival Award’, and the all-important ‘Best Toilets’ at the UK Festival Awards 2010. Paul Duhaney, Director of Oyé, won the Merseyside Black Achiever award in 2010. In 2014, the festival won the 'Inspiration Award 2014' from GIT [Getintothis]. More recently the festival has been nominated for a 'Merseyside Tourism Award' and 'Northern Soul Award' in 2018. In 2019, the festival won 'People's Choice Award 2019', 'International Reach Award 2019', and 'Improving Community Cohesion Award 2019' at the Liverpool City Region Culture & Creativity Awards. The chair of the board of trustees for Africa Oyé is Sonia Bassey MBE. In 2022, the festival was shortlisted for 'The Positively Perfect Pivot Award' at the UK Festival Awards. In the same year, the festival was a finalist for the 'Liverpool Echo Community Event of the Year'. In 2023 the festival was again nominated for the 'People's Choice' Award at the LCR Culture & Creativity Awards.

== Oyé touring and trading ==
Africa Oyé launched an additional strand of work in April 2009, funded by the Arts Council, called Oyé Touring and Trading. Along with 5 other national organisations (Serious, Punch Records, Joyful Noise, and CMAT) and as part of the Black Routes network, Oyé produced two National tours, and a Learning and Participation Project called The Legacy Roots and Music in Liverpool. The first two tours were with Jamaican Reggae artist Freddie McGregor in June and Odemba OK Jazz All Stars from DR Congo on September 9, 2010, featured To’Mezclao; while 2011 saw several artists take part, including tours with Misty in Roots and Yellowman. Oyé also hosted one-off shows with Wailing Souls and The Mighty Diamonds during the same year. Oyé were also the first to bring Songhoy Blues to the UK on tour in January and February 2015.
