= Extreme Noise Terror =

British crust punk and extreme metal band

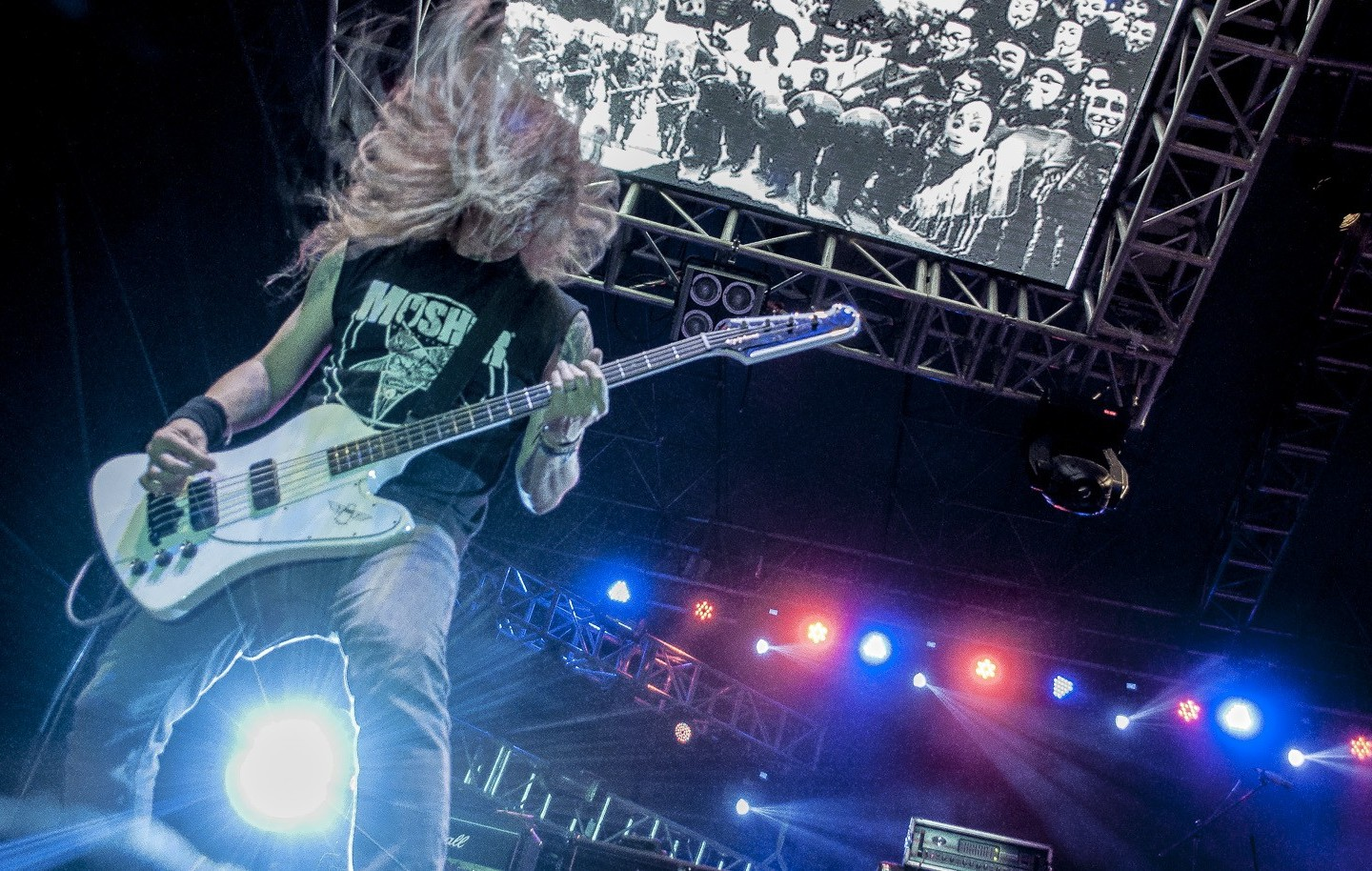
- Extreme Noise Terror performing at Manizales Grita Rock in 2015

Background information
- Origin: Ipswich, England, United Kingdom
- Genres: Grindcore; death metal; crust punk
- Years active: 1985–present
- Labels: Manic Ears; Head Eruption; Discipline; Vinyl Japan; Candlelight; Deathwish; Earache; Moshpit Tragedy; Osmose; Strange Fruit; MCR Company; Farewell; Low Life; Willowtip
- Members: Dean Jones; Ben McCrow; Ollie Jones; Staff Glover; Michael Hourihan
- Past members: (See below)
- Website: www.extremenoiseterror.co.uk

Extreme Noise Terror (often abbreviated to ENT) are a British extreme metal band formed in Ipswich, England in 1985. They are considered to be one of the earliest and most influential crust bands. Noted for one of the earliest uses of dual vocalists in hardcore and for recording a number of sessions for BBC Radio 1 DJ John Peel, the band started as crust punks and helped characterise the early, archetypal grindcore sound with political lyrics, fast guitars and tempos, and short songs.

== Biography ==
=== Early years ===
Extreme Noise Terror were formed in early 1985 in Ipswich, England, originally consisting of vocalists Dean Jones and Phil Vane, guitarist Pete Hurley, bassist Jerry Clay and drummer Pig Killer. Prior to ENT, Vane and Hurley had played with Discharge-influenced acts Freestate and Victims of War, whilst Jones had been singing with Raw Noise. Hurley claims that the band name came from an insert for an album by Dutch band Lärm: "It featured a bandanna-ed hardcore kid with 'Extreme Noise Terror' surrounding him. Those three words summed up exactly what we were aiming at." Aside from Discharge, the band cite as early influences Anti Cimex, Rattus and Antisect, another early proponent of the "one high, one low" vocal approach. ENT signed to small UK-based indie label Manic Ears after a single show supporting Chaos UK.

Their first release for the label was a split LP with Chaos UK in 1986, Radioactive Earslaughter. Although the two bands were similar, ENT were beginning to twist hardcore into grindcore. ENT have expressed misgivings about the term:

We were known as hardcore punk. Then it became this 'Britcore' thing that Sounds and NME came up with, with the Electro Hippies, Napalm, Carcass and Bolt Thrower all rolled into one, all playing the same shows and then Napalm Death made the word 'grind' up. But they were always a bit more metal than us and we didn't really know what this word 'grind' meant.

In 1987, ENT came to the attention of John Peel, on the recommendation of fellow Ipswich group The Stupids. After seeing them live at the Caribbean Centre in Ipswich, Peel offered them the first of four Peel Sessions for BBC Radio 1, which was released through Strange Fruit. They recorded a second Peel Session the following May.

During this period, drummer Mick Harris (formerly of Napalm Death) left the band to form Scorn. Tony "Stick" Dickens of crust band Doom replaced him. Bassist Clay was replaced with Mark Gardener. This line-up recorded ENT's debut album, A Holocaust in Your Head, later voted number 3 in Terrorizer's essential European grindcore albums, who described it as "marrying a thick crust-punk crunch and vitriolic lyrical assault with the newborn, clattering fury of grindcore, 'Holocaust...' followed Napalm's heroic uppercuts and haymakers with a Doc Martin in the goolies." The band headlined a tour of Europe and Japan to support the album. In 1990, Jones and future ENT guitarist Ali Firouzbakht guested on Raw Noise's "Sound of Destruction" single release, and bassist Gardener was replaced with Pete Nash from the band Doom.

=== Collaboration with the KLF ===
On their return from Japan, ENT were invited to perform their third Peel Session, which was released along with their first as a full-length LP by Strange Fruit. The band went on another European tour, after which they released their second record, Phonophobia, through Vinyl Japan, and toured Japan again. Further radio support from John Peel brought ENT to the attention of Bill Drummond of the KLF. The two acts got in touch, and Drummond asked ENT to re-record a version of KLF's hit single "3 a.m. Eternal", with the intention of the band performing live on Top of the Pops at Christmas.

The BBC felt that the song was inappropriate for broadcast on daytime television and refused to air the track, leading to the KLF boycotting the show. The single saw limited edition release through KLF Communications and won Single of the Week from the NME and Melody Maker. ENT worked on the abandoned KLF album The Black Room (the KLF had previously released an album called The White Room), but they deleted the recordings when Drummond and KLF co-member Jimmy Cauty announced the band's retirement.

When asked how the collaboration came about, Jones said, "What actually happened was that Bill heard us on Peel when he was in the bath and got in touch. They had wanted to do rock versions of their songs with Motörhead but something fell through, so he rang us... The message said it's Bill from The KLF, but I thought they said 'the ALF' so I didn't take much notice... Later, we got another message saying it was definitely Bill from The KLF and I said 'f--- off! What does he want with us?' But it all got explained eventually." The two bands were asked to appear at the 1992 BRIT Awards, at which they caused controversy by firing blanks from machine guns into the audience, a performance that the NME listed at number 4 in their "top 100 rock moments".

=== Retro-bution, Vane's departure and subsequent albums ===
Extreme Noise Terror continued to tour throughout 1993 and 1994, and underwent further line-up changes. Drummer Dickens left to join DIRT and was replaced with former member Pig Killer. Lee Barrett (founder of Candlelight Records and also member of Disgust) took over on bass. Ali Firouzbakht joined on lead guitar. At the request of Digby Pearson, this line-up signed to Earache in June 1994 and recorded Retro-bution, a compilation of early, re-recorded material, which was released in January 1995. The motivation for this release was the band's dissatisfaction with their earlier recordings. ENT took a more metal direction, including the addition of some guitar solos. A short UK tour followed, followed by touring in Europe and the US and a further line-up change when Pig Killer was replaced with former Cradle of Filth drummer William A. "Was" Sarginson. After several years as a professional photographer, Pig Killer joined The Featherz in 2013 under the name Dazzle Monroe. The line-up changes continued with the departure of founder member Phil Vane, who joined Napalm Death in late 1996. Napalm Death frontman Mark "Barney" Greenway joined ENT during the recording of their next album, Damage 381.

On the album, whose title comes from the BPM recorded on the title track, ENT moved further into death metal, reincorporating the blast beats and screamed vocals that were missing from their previous two releases. The album benefited from production by metal producer Colin Richardson. At the same time, Napalm Death were having a hard time getting the vocals that they wanted from Vane and asked Greenway to return, which he agreed to do, leaving ENT without a second vocalist. Vane returned to the band in 1997.

Further line-up changes occurred in 1999. Vane departed to be replaced with Adam Catchpole. Sarginson was replaced with Zac O'Neil. Former Cradle of Filth member Gian Pyres joined on lead guitar. In 2001, the band signed to Candlelight and released their fourth full-length album, Being and Nothing. The band played a fourth session for BBC Radio 1 in February 2001 and continued to tour round Europe, including a slot on the main stage at Wacken Open Air in 2003.

=== Recent activity ===
Paul "Woody" Woodfield took over on lead guitar in early 2001. Stafford Glover took over on bass from the departing Barrett, who left to concentrate on To-Mera. Desecration's Ollie Jones joined the line-up as permanent second guitarist. In early 2006, Vane returned to the band after living in Switzerland for six and a half years. Zac O'Neil left the band, to be replaced with Mic Hourihan (of Desecration and Tigertailz). In 2007, ENT toured the US with grindcore band Phobia and released a split recording with Driller Killer through French label Osmose. The following year, the band released a split 7-inch with Trap Them (released on Deathwish Inc.) to coincide with their joint US West Coast Distortion tour, which culminated at the 2008 Los Angeles Murderfest. Amongst playing shows worldwide, including Indonesia, Russia, Hungary, Slovenia, Romania, Finland, Germany, Estonia and at the Obscene Extreme Festival in the Czech Republic, ENT recorded their next album, Law of Retaliation, released in early 2009 by Osmose in Europe, MCR Company in Japan, and Deep Six Records in the US. Terrorizer described it as "a rabid, intense and gleeful return to explosive, hyper-speed hardcore punk insanity". The band continued to tour with shows throughout 2009 in Europe and a third Japanese tour, this time with Slang.

Though very political, the band has become more open-minded regarding some of their beliefs in recent years, especially concerning vegetarianism, and the use of drugs and alcohol. Jones commented:

I think now it's more acceptable not being vegetarian, being PC, admitting that you like having sex, because at one point with the likes of Profane Existence [anarchist punk fanzine] and Maximumrockandroll [legendary punk zine, infamous for scene policing], and I hate to say it, but it felt like some sort of restrictive Nazi regime. You have to be like this to be crust. Which to me was the total opposite to what it should be. I stayed with my beliefs, but I didn't like being told what to do to fit in with the audience [...] But now, the progression is more to do with that the fact that everyone is doing what they want, whether it's drink, drugs, sex. So yes, it has progressed.

On 17 February 2011, Vane died in his sleep due to a cerebrovascular accident at the age of 46. The band have continued to tour and release music with former Gorerotted and The Rotted frontman Ben McCrow, with the band dedicating their 2015 self-titled album to Vane's memory.

== Members ==
Current

- Dean Jones – vocals (1985–present)
- Ollie Jones – guitars (2005–present)
- Michael Hourihan – drums (2008–2011, 2014–present)
- Ben McCrow – vocals (2014–present)
- Dicky Moore – bass (2019–present)

Former

- Phil Vane – vocals (1985–1999, 2006–2011; died 2011)
- Pete Hurley – guitars (1985–1995; died 2014)
- Jerry Clay – bass (1985–1988)
- Pig Killer – drums (1985–1987, 1993–1995)
- Mick Harris – drums (1987–1988, 2008)
- Tony "Stick" Dickens – drums (1988–1999)
- Mark Gardener – bass (1988)
- Peter (Doom) Nash – bass (1988–1990)
- Spit – vocals (1989)
- Mark Bailey – bass (1990–1994)
- Si Brown – drums (1990)
- Lee Barrett – bass (1994–1997)
- William A. "Was" Sarginson – drums (1995–1997)

- Ali Firouzbakht – lead guitar (1995–2005)
- Mark "Barney" Greenway – vocals (1996–1997)
- Zac O`Neil – drums (1997–2008)
- Manny Cooke – bass (1997–2001)
- Jose Kurt – vocals (1999–2000)
- Adam Catchpole – vocals (2000–2006)
- Stafford Glover – bass (2001–2012)
- Paul Woodfield;- guitar (2001–?)
- Andi Morris - bass (2012–2019)
- Woody – rhythm guitar (2001–2010, 2011–2014)
- Chris 'Chino' Casket – rhythm guitar, bass (studio: 2009–2014/live: 2010–2012)
- Roman Matuszewski – vocals (2011–2012)
- Barney Monger – drums (2011–2014)
- John Loughlin – vocals (2012–2014)

== Discography ==
=== Studio albums ===
- A Holocaust in Your Head (1989)
- Retro-bution (1995)
- Damage 381 (1997)
- Being and Nothing (2001)
- Law of Retaliation (2008)
- Extreme Noise Terror (2015)

=== Split albums ===
- Extreme Noise Terror/ Chaos UK (Radioactive Earslaughter) (1986)
- In It for Life (1989)
- Discharged: From Home Front to War Front (1991)
- Extreme Noise Terror / Driller Killer (2007)
- Extreme Noise Terror / Trap Them (2008)
- Extreme Noise Terror / Cock E.S.P. (2009)
- Hardcore Attack of the Low Life Dogs (2010)
- Extreme Noise Terror / The Dwarves (2016)
- Daily Holocaust (2017)

=== EPs ===
- The Peel Sessions (1987)
- Phonophobia (1992)
- Hatred and the Filth (2004)
- Phonophobia II – The Second Coming (2009) (Features two new studio tracks - credits: Barney Monger, Chris Casket, Dean Jones, Phil Vane
- Hardcore Attack of the Low Life Dogs (2010)
- Tear It Down (2013)
- Chained and Crazed (2015)

=== Live albums ===
- Are You That Desperate? (1989)
- The Peel Sessions '87–'90 (1990)
- The Split Noiz Live EP (1990)
- Live & Loud (1990)

=== Compilation albums ===
- Back to the Roots (2008)

=== DVDs ===
- From One Extreme to Another (2003)

=== Music videos ===
- "Raping the Earth" (1995)
- "Awakening" (2002)
- "No One Is Innocent" (2016)
- "Dogma, Intolerance, Control" (2016)

== See also ==
- List of The Peel Sessions artists
