= Silvery =

London-based 4-piece indie rock band

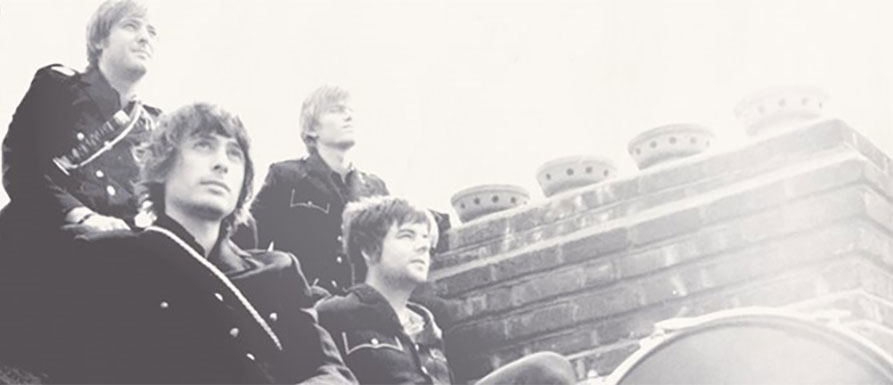
- Silvery on the roof of Fortress Studios in 2008

Background information
- Origin: London, England
- Genres: Indie rock, indie pop, circus punk
- Years active: 2004–present
- Label: Blow Up Records
- Members: James Orman; Simon Harris; Alex Sawyer; Joe Hurley
- Past members: David Williams; Nick Harsant
- Website: silvery.bandcamp.com

Silvery are a London-based 4-piece indie rock band, signed to Blow Up Records (the label of the Britpop night club Blow Up).

== History ==
Early shows comprised theatrical affairs, featuring bubble machines, Victorian uniforms, sword fights and flowers, The band gained a cult following and attracted reviews in NME as well as invitations to play at venues including KOKO in Camden, and O2 Wireless festival in Hyde Park, London. In the Summer of 2007 the band was picked up by Blow Up Records.

Their debut release was a double A-side single "Horrors" / "Orders", the accompanying video appeared on MTV2 and in Topshop branches around the UK. Their next single "Devil in the Detail" and the album Thunderer & Excelsior were released on the same day in August 2008, launched at an in-store performance as part of the Rough Trade East record shop 1st Year anniversary. "Devil in the Detail" won a BBC 6 Music roundtable vote against The Streets and Katy Perry, and the station selected the album as Album of the Day on 12 August 2009. Positive reviews appeared in publications such as The Word, Q, Artrocker and Clash, who included a track on a covermount CD with their September 2008 issue. Steve Lamacq championed the band, stating that they should have been nominated for that year's Mercury Music Prize.

Following the release of the album, Silvery played a series of one-off shows, most notably British Sea Power's Sing Ye From The Hillside festival at the Tan Hill Inn, Yorkshire. The third single "Action Force" was made Lamacq's Single of the Week on his BBC 6 Music show and featured on Chris Evans' BBC Radio 2 Drivetime Juke Box Jury on 21 October 2008.

The band ended 2008 with a one off Christmas single, a cover of "You Give A Little Love" (by Paul Williams from the musical Bugsy Malone) voted Steve Lamacq's Rebel Playlist winner on his BBC 6 Music show and healthy showings of Thunderer & Excelsior in the Artrocker and Organ Top albums of 2008 lists.

The Nishikado EP was released in May 2009 (featuring a new mix of a track already picked up by several album reviews as the stand out) which peaked at number 11 on the Dutch Free40 chart.

In July 2010, the band emerged with a live BBC 6 Music radio session to promote their second album Railway Architecture, a track from which appeared on that month's Artrocker magazine 'The Sounds of the Summer' covermount CD'. The band contributed an exclusive cover version of a song by Cardiacs to a tribute album for Cardiacs mainman Tim Smith who had suffered a stroke in 2008. "Spell with a Shell" featured alongside tracks by XTC, Ultrasound, The Magic Numbers, and Oceansize. Eighth single "Two Halves of the Same Boy" released on Valentine's Day 2011 was playlisted on BBC 6 Music for five weeks at the start of the year as the band made a return to London's Koko venue for Club NME.

After a download only Christmas single "Christmas Is Easy" / "Christ on a Bike" in December 2012, the band released their third album Etiquette as a free download via their website in August 2013.

== Influences ==
While most reviews suggest a mix of Blur, Sparks and Kaiser Chiefs, Silvery themselves have often cited a wider range of interests. An interview on BBC Radio 1 on 4 August 2008 suggested that musically, the cult British band Cardiacs are an influence, as are Swindon's XTC, the more glam rock moments of Queen and David Bowie, as much as the Victorian science fiction of H. G. Wells, and magazines such as Fortean Times and a childhood obsession with obsolete diesel locomotives.

== Discography ==
=== Albums ===
- Thunderer And Excelsior (2008)
- Railway Architecture (2010)
- Etiquette (2013)
- London Metal (2022)
- The Returning (2022)

=== Singles/EPs ===
- "Horrors" / "Orders" (2008)
- "Devil in the Detail" (2008)
- "Action Force" (2008)
- "You Give A Little Love" (2008)
- "The Nishikado EP" (2009)
- "The Naked and the Dead" (2010)
- "A Deconstruction of Roles" (2010)
- "Two Halves of the Same Boy" (2010)
- "Christmas Is Easy" / "Christ on a Bike" (2012)
