= Big Boss Man (band) =

English funk and Latin band

- Origin: London, England
- Genres: Funk, Latin
- Years active: 1998– Present
- Label: Blow Up Records
- Members: Nasser Bouzida; Trevor Harding; Roger Green; Nick Pitcher
- Past members: Clive Cornwall; Nick Nicholls; Scott Milsom; Desmond Rogers; Badger Burgess
- Website: big-boss-man.com

Big Boss Man is a British funk and Latin band that originated in London, England in 1998. The band lineup includes Nasser Bouzida, also known as 'The Bongolian', on organs, percussion, and vocals, Roger Green on bass guitar, Trevor Harding on electric guitar, Nick Pitcher on drums.

== Formation and early years ==
Nasser Bouzida, raised in Harlow, England, spent his formative years in Newbury, Berkshire, where he developed a deep appreciation for Latin music. In his early twenties, he appeared on the low-budget cable TV show Jenny Powell's Hot where he initially met Trevor Harding. A quote from their website describes the pair:

Bouzida and Harding soon formed an unbreakable bond through their love of the Portsmouth Sea life centre and Roxy Music. After witnessing a life-changing gig by world music surrealists Bandanna at the now infamous Bedford Arms, the two formed Espadrille. Their first big break came when Sea Link offered them a glamorous five show per day three-month contract, including two free hot meals per day and unlimited access to the mini-bar. On one particularly choppy entertainment voyage, the duo bumped into Coffin Nails' tattooed psycho dog-man "Mad-Man" Scott Milsom and indie sex-fiend / owner of Europe's thinnest ears; Nick Nichols. Bouzida previously worked as a George Michael tribute act in Spain working as Jorge Miguel.

In the first half of 1999, the band performed at the Blow Up venue, located at the Wag club in Soho, London. According to the band's website, they received positive reception from the crowd, which had filled the club to its usual capacity.

as usual the club was packed and the crowd absolutely loved the Big Boss Sound. They were then immediately signed up to the club's very own Blow Up record label.

Subsequently, the band made their debut release as part of the V2 Blow Up compilation Blow Up A Go-Go with the demo version of the track "Humanize," recorded in the band's Ramshackle studios. This track was later re-recorded and served as the title track for the band's debut album.

In 2000, the band contributed to and composed the soundtrack for the short comedy film Sweet. This film featured the UK comedy duo The Mighty Boosh (Julian Barratt and Noel Fielding), who received the Perrier Best Newcomers award at the Edinburgh Festival. Additionally, apart from providing the soundtrack, the band appeared in the club scenes and as extras in the bar scenes of the film. In November 2000, their track "Xmas BOOGALOO" was included in the compilation album It's A Cool, Cool Christmas.

=== "Sea Groove" ===
In September 2000, Big Boss Man released their debut single, "Sea Groove," as part of Blow Up's new series of 7" records titled Blow Up 45's. The name "Sea Groove" may have stemmed from the fortuitous meeting of the band members on a ferry. The single received a favorable review from Select magazine, alongside other notable artists like Eminem, Coldplay, and Fat Boy Slim. To mark its release, the band performed at a Blow Up club event commemorating the opening of the "My Generation" Fashion and Photography Exhibition in Stockholm.

== Humanize ==
Big Boss Man's debut album, Humanize, featuring the singles "Sea Groove," "Big Boss Man," and "Sell Your Soul," was released in April 2001. The band describes their sound on their website as "a hip heavy Hammond hybrid of pop, 6T's R'n'B / Latin soul, and funk." The album is primarily instrumental, with the exception of the songs "Humanize," "Big Boss Man," "Money," and "Sell Your Soul." Among these tracks, "Big Boss Man" and "Sell Your Soul" follow a standard structure of verse/chorus, while the other two feature a repeated phrase throughout the song.

In May 2001, Later magazine distributed 100,000 copies of a compilation CD titled The Later Lounge, featuring kitsch classics from the 1960s and 1970s. Big Boss Man was the sole contemporary act featured on the CD with their track "Party 7." They shared space with other acts such as James Clarke, Grant Green, Herbie Hancock, Paul Nero, and Hugo Montenegro.

In December 2001, Later magazine released a compilation CD titled The Later Lounge 2, which included the band's debut single "Sea Groove."

In 2006, "Party 7" was featured in a series of advertisements for Nike's FIFA 2006 World Cup campaign titled "Henry," which starred Thierry Henry and Eric Cantona. Coincidentally, the BBC coverage of the 2006 FIFA World Cup Final in the UK also featured "Party 7." Blow Up Records reissued the Humanize album in 2006, with stickers on the sleeve referencing the advertisement.

In 2002, following the release of Humanize, Big Boss Man embarked on a European tour to promote the album. The tour included three weeks in Spain, two weeks in Germany, performances in Moscow and Venice, and concluded with two weeks in France, including a performance at the Le Rock Dans Tousses Etats festival in Évreux, where they played to an audience of 10,000 people.

Upon returning from their European tour, Big Boss Man continued to perform throughout England and Scotland. They were also invited to rework and remix tracks for Japanese artist Mansfield's Golden Hour album. Additionally, they reinterpreted Ingfried Hoffmann's 1960s/70s Euro-cult TV theme "Robbi, Tobbi und das Fliewatüüt" for an EP released by Germany's Diggler Records.

=== 2003 ===
Big Boss Man returned to Europe, headlining at the Aucard de Tours festival and the Cosmic Trip festival. They subsequently embarked on a two-week tour of Spain, performing at various cult festivals and club gigs. The tour concluded with a sold-out show at Madrid's Sala Caracol venue.

=== 2004 ===
Paul Weller released a single titled "The Bottle," which Big Boss Man remixed. The single entered the UK top 20. Two special limited edition versions (vocal and instrumental) were released and quickly became collector's items. Later that year, Coca-Cola France used the band's second single "Big Boss Man" for promotional purposes. In May, the band performed at Cosmic Groove parties in Paris and Montpellier, and in July, they played at Festival Beat in Italy. Nasser Bouzida then toured Spain with a live revue of his spin-off solo album, The Bongolian, and was invited to guest with Woodstock's Country Joe and the Fish and the 1960s British mod soul band The Action.

== Winner ==
Big Boss Man released their second album, Winner, in April 2005. The album incorporated a more pronounced Latin influence while retaining its foundation of funk, jazz, and soul, along with the distinctive sounds of the Hammond organ. No singles were released from the album, but the opening track, "Kelvin Stardust," was featured on the Soulshaker Volume 2 compilation album released by Blow Up Records in July 2005..

To further differentiate from Humanize, Winner included more vocal tracks, although it remained primarily instrumental. Four songs—"Fall In Fall Out," "Complicated Lady," "Reach Out," and "Got It So Bad"—featured full lyrics. The album also included French vocals in the song "Tu as Gache Mon Talent Ma Cherie," with the only lyrics being the song's title. This track may have been influenced by the band's significant fan base in France, where Winner received extensive radio play.

To promote Winner, Big Boss Man undertook a 12-date tour of France in the spring. They also returned to Spain for a 16-date autumn tour, which included a second appearance on the Spanish television show Radio 3. Notably, the end of the song "Jackson 16" features a clip that appears to be from a Spanish radio or TV show.

"The Hawk," the 11th track from Winner, was included in Come On Soul, an international compilation of vintage and contemporary dance floor tracks released by the Legre record label in Hamburg in 2008.

== Full English Beat Breakfast ==
Full English Beat Breakfast, released in September 2009, represents the band's most ambitious project to date, featuring increased use of synthesizers compared to their previous work.

== Last Man on Earth ==
Last Man On Earth, released in September 2014, marks the fourth album from Big Boss Man, featuring 15 new recordings available on 180g heavy-weight vinyl LP, CD, and digital formats.

The band adopts a novel approach to the BBM sound, enhancing their hip hybrid of Latin, jazz, soul, psych rock, and 1960s/'70s drenched R&B with the incorporation of a brass section and guest vocalists. This expansion results in further sonic and rhythmic explorations from the band, offering a fresh journey for listeners.

The album features the single "Aardvark," a jazz dance floor filler that was promptly released after completion of studio mix sessions in April. It garnered substantial radio support from BBC 6 Music and BBC Radio 2, with multiple spins by Craig Charles on his Funk and Soul Show. Charles expressed admiration for Big Boss Man, stating, "I've been a big fan of Big Boss Man for many years. Big Boss Man 'Aardvark'. Double Groovy!" Additionally, the song received airplay from Cerys Matthews, Gideon Coe, Tom Ravenscroft, Chris Hawkins, and Huey Morgan on the stations.

== Discography ==
=== Albums ===
- Humanize (2001)
- Winner (2005)
- Full English Beat Breakfast (2009)
- Last Man on Earth (2014)
- Bossin’ Around (2024)

Join the Jet Set (2026)

=== Singles ===
- "Sea Groove" (2000)
- "Big Boss Man" (2001)
- "Sell Your Soul" (2002)
- "The Hawk" (2005)
- "Party 7 / Kelvin Stardust" (2006)
- "Black Eye (I Believed in Love)" (2009)
- "C'Est Moi" (2010)
- "Aardvark" (2014)
- "Return of Baron Samedi" (2022)
- "Double Groovy" (2022)
- "Do the Backstroke" (2023)
- "Das Freak" (2024)
- ”Lambretta Boogaloo” (2025)
- Don’t Take My Baby Away (2026)
