= Dead Drunk =

Dead Drunk may refer to:

== Books ==
- Dead Drunk, novel by George Bagby 1952
- Dead Drunk, novel by Arthur Porges 1959
- Dead Drunk, novel by Hartley Howard 1974
- "Dead Drunk: In Memoriam William Cannastra, 1924-1950", poem by Alan Ansen

== Film and TV ==
- Dead Drunk: the Kevin Tunell Story directed by Juan Jose Campanella HBO
- Dead Drunk, 2002 film with Tom Georgeson, Andrew Schofield (actor)
- "Dead Drunk", episode of The Commish 1994
- Dead Drunk, 2012 horror movie with Alan Rowe Kelly

== Music ==
- Dead Drunk (album), by Terrestrial Tones
- "Dead Drunk" song by Gorerotted from A New Dawn for the Dead 2005
