= The Featherz =

British alternative rock band (e. 2011)

- Origin: London, England
- Genres: Punk rock, glam punk
- Years active: 2011–present (Dormant since early 2019)
- Labels: Flockrock, Charles of London
- Members: Danie Cox/Centric; Dazzle Monroe
- Past members: See below

The Featherz (formerly The Feathers) are a Welsh and English band with glam and punk influences (self-styled as "Flock Rock") led by Danie Cox on lead vocals and guitar. Cox formed the band with two fellow former members of Poussez Posse (aka Georgie Girl And Her Poussez Posse), a band fronted by Georgina Baillie and mentored by Adam Ant. After leaving Baillie and Ant to form their own group, they released a number of singles from 2013, and an album, Five-Year-Itch, in 2017. The band have toured with Boy George and The Damned.

Since May 2014, Cox is the last remaining founder member. Since 2018 the only other permanent member has been longtime drummer Dazzle Monroe (formerly of Extreme Noise Terror). Together, Cox and Monroe continued to record and play live under the Featherz bandname either as a duo or else with guest lead guitarists/bassists until early 2019. Since then, the band has been mostly on hold while Cox focuses on her side project, all-female Slade tribute band Slady (styled SLADY).

== History ==
=== 2011–2014 - Formation ===
Cox arrived in London in October 2010 to pursue a career as a professional musician. In January 2011, she was recruited to Georgie Girl And Her Poussez Posse as guitarist and backing vocalist. The band also included Baillie, Molly Spiers-MacLeod (the daughter of Spizz) on bass and backing vocals, drummer Rachael Smith and additional guitarist Fiona Bevan. This lineup supported Ant on four tour dates in Spring/Summer 2011 and recorded tracks for a planned single plus EP. Footage from early 2011 of a Poussez Posse band meeting at Ant's home is included in The Blueblack Hussar, a documentary about Ant directed by Jack Bond. Unhappy with the general direction of the band and Ant's style of mentoring, Cox, Spiers-MacLeod and Smith all left the group. The trio formed their own band The Feathers, making their debut guerilla gig appearance at the Occupy London camp outside St Paul's Cathedral on 23 October 2011.

The band's track "Life Stranger" was released on the compilation Hipsters 3. Cox and Spiers-MacLeod also performed an acoustic set on Garry Bushell's Rancid Sounds radio show on TotalRock in April 2012. Two years later in April 2014, they performed a second acoustic set for Bushell's show - by now transferred to online literary community Litopia's podcast section.At around the time of the first session, Smith left the group to be replaced by Alex Gold, also of The Boys. Gold in turn would be replaced by Monroe by 2013.

In April 2013, Cox befriended Boy George after they met at the launch party of an exhibition of stage costumes of their mutual hero David Bowie at the Victoria and Albert Museum at which George was a guest speaker. Impressed with the appearance and demeanour of the glammed-up Cox, George invited her to show herself on stage. Subsequently, Cox appeared in three videos for singles by George: "I'm Coming Home" (also featuring a cameo by Monroe), "King of Everything" and "My God" directed by Dean Stockings. The band also supported George on his November 2013 solo UK tour to promote his album This Is What I Do.

In early 2013, the band undertook a photo session for fashion designer Mark Charles and his Charles of London fashion label. From then until mid 2016, all band members regularly wore Charles' designs as stagewear. Charles also released the band's debut single "RNR★" on his Charles Of London Records label. The A-side was later included on the compilation CD Teenage Rampage, cover-mounted on issue 16 of Vive Le Rock magazine. The magazine's track guide described Cox as a "rising star" and the band as "injected with glam rock attitude" which "will give you glitter-covered goose bumps and get your feet stomping." The single also received airplay on BBC Radio Wales and Radio Caroline.

The Ipswich Star gave a headline preview to the band's 25 January 2014 gig at the Steamboat Tavern in Monroe's native Ipswich, alongside a photo of the band, noting how "The London trio, fresh from suporting [sic] Boy George on his recent UK tour, led by Danie Cox, are getting rave reviews for their brand of punk-pop." Wales On Sunday extensively interviewed Cox in the 9 February 2014 edition about the band, their associations with Ant, Baillie, George and Charles, and her life in general. Commenting on Cox and her band, the newspaper noted "With her electrifying red hair, extravagant make-up and outrageous dress sense, 23-year-old Danie Cox and her band The Featherz look every inch pop stars."

=== 2014–2016 - Alice Atkinson era ===
By 2015 the band consisted of Cox, Monroe and Alice Atkinson, occasionally joined by various guest guitarists, including David Donley, and Vera Wild. In late 2014, they recorded fresh material at Broadoak Studios, Sussex with producer/guitarist Kevin Armstrong. Their 14 February 2015 headline gig at the Irish Centre in Basingstoke received praise from the Basingstoke Gazette "The headline band were The Featherz ... who continued the general theme of girls showing just how well they can rock it up ... Not quite as heavy as (second on the bill act) Petrol Girls, they still had a real fast punky set. They had also picked up a posse of new followers who were now ready to worship every bead and every bit of glitter - as well as dance along to their songs."

The band also played the Pavilion Stage of the 2015 Rebellion Festival. Their set received an enthusiastic review from Martin Haslam of Louder Than War: "Bringing their brand of self-styled ‘Flock Rock’ to the masses, I'm pleased that the venue is filling up. Glam anthems (Glamthems?) get the crowd onside, ‘When Was The Last Time You Had Sex?’ and other ear worms. I’ve seen them before, but this line up has added Alice Atkinson, which is a very good thing; the three-piece with Danie Cox and Dazzle Monroe are now tighter and born to entertain. Championed by Boy George and dressed by Charles Of London, they deserve your attention. Now!" The band appeared again at the 2017 and 2018 festivals, both times on the Opera House stage. Cox returned to the festival in 2023 on the Empress Ballroom main stage with Slady who also played 2024 on the Almost Acoustic stage as a duo. The full band played the Club Casbah stage in 2025.

A second single for Charles Of London Records, "You" was released from the sessions with Armstrong on download in early September 2015 followed by a CD release two months later. A video was filmed back in April 2015 in Brighton, directed by Stockings. Interviewed by Haslam at Rebellion for Louder Than War, Cox announced that the band's next release would be their debut album. Cox also commented on her philosophy as a performer and bandleader: "I'd always had a dream, to write my own songs, to express myself through my clothes and how I present myself. Luckily, I found that in The Featherz, in London ... We are The Featherz, there is nothing else for me. I'd rather die than give up. Our songs are statements. It really is all I can do"

The band played three high profile support slots in Sheffield, Liverpool and London, for The Damned. Following the death of her hero David Bowie in January 2016, Cox was filmed by Italian television show Studio Aperto performing Bowie's songs at his shrine at the Heddon Street telephone box while the Featherz performed at a Bowie memorial concert at the Union Chapel, Islington with Mick Ronson's sister Maggi guesting with the band on vocals for "Ziggy Stardust" Cox and Mike Garson's biographer Clifford Slapper also performed a vocal/piano version of "We Are the Dead".

Also in early 2016 the band, plus Donley again on additional guitar, recorded new material at Quadra Studios in Walthamstow with producer John Lucifer. In June a video, featuring the new lineup including Chris Shepherd, was filmed in Southend for Atkinson composition "Forget All You Know". In early September, the video was posted to YouTube and this track and a cover of "Moonage Daydream" (featuring Slapper on piano), both from the Quadra session, were uploaded to the group's Bandcamp account and iTunes store. Prior to this, a trailer video featuring a clip from a third track from Quadra, a cover of "The Ballroom Blitz" had been posted to YouTube. Cox and Slapper recorded another version of Moonage Daydream for the latter's planned album Bowiesongs 2, while Cox also collaborated with The Lurkers on their track High Velocity, which was released as a single 24 November 2017. Louder Than War's Ged Babey praised Cox's contribution: "Dani (sic) has a likeable Honey Bane meets Beki Bondage singing style and is perfect on the song." The track received airplay on Steve Lamacq's show on BBC Radio 6music and Cox recorded further material with the Lurkers in December 2017, February 2018 and May 2018.

=== 2016–2018 - Five-Year-Itch, Ordinary Girl? EP ===
By February 2017 Atkinson and Shepherd had left and bassist Lucy Lawbreaker and additional guitarist Aryanne Maudit had joined. In the meantime, the band produced new music videos of the tracks Chelsea, Takes One To Know One and Moonage Daydream and recorded further material in Quadra Studios with Lucifer and Faebhean Kwest.

Appearing on internet radio station K2K Radio's show Flipside London Radio hosted by Aidan McManus, on 28 March 2017, Cox confirmed that the band's imminent debut album was entitled Five-Year-Itch and would be 17 tracks long. The album was released on 13 April 2017 and was compiled by Lucifer (who also funded the release) from content from various sessions since 2012 (hence the album title) including material from his own sessions with the band at Quadra Studios as well as the Broadoak Studios sessions with Armstrong, both sides of the "RNR★" single recorded in 2013 and the band's earliest attempt at making an album at Perry Vale Studios in 2012, as well as Lucifer's own live recordings of the band. Vive Le Rock's Alison Bateman rated the album 7/10. Although lukewarm about the choices of covers included, she nevertheless enthused, "(The band) have already built a buzz with their energetic live shows, centred on flame-haired attitude-oozing young frontwoman Danie Cox. Their cheeky punked-up glitter rock risks being a tough act to translate to the studio, but Five-Year-Itch mostly manages with charismatic flair... They're neither short on musical chops, nor shy of buckling down to serious business of writing infuriatingly immovable hooks."

The band's next single, "Ordinary Girl?", recorded late 2016 at Quadra with Atkinson and Shepherd (shortly before their departures) and produced by Lucifer, was released on Bandcamp on 1 May 2017. The single cover featured Cox's friend, the late Imogen Goldie. In September, the band announced their intention to recruit a keyboard player. The band supported Penetration (whose song Don't Dictate previously appeared on Five-Year-Itch) on 26 October at the O2 Islington.

The CD edition of "Ordinary Girl?" was released on 3 January 2018, also including the last remaining tracks from the first Quadra studios session from early 2016. Ged Babey, reviewing the EP for Louder Than War, was suitably impressed, describing the band as "brash, flash, glam, blam-blam wiggy, Ziggy, rockin rollin’, into Bolan… just a great old-skool party band," the lead track as having "the feel of a fab 1979 Noo Wave single -sprinkled with glitter and all over Radio Wun - not arf!" with "that staccato Lene Lovich feel that Hazel O'Connor nicked and lovely thick slices of guitar," the video as "beautifully lo-fi and am-dram and captures a band who take their music but not themselves too seriously," and the cover image of Imogen Goldie as "proving if nothing else that behind the glitter there are some tears and there is more ‘depth’ to the band than there might initially seem."

In April with lead guitarist Calle Englemarc of The Members and Jenny Lane on bass, they filmed an official live video at the Dublin Castle

=== 2019–present - Side projects ===
Centric's second single with The Lurkers, "Electrical Guitar", came out in January 2019 and topped the UK Vinyl Singles chart. Parent album Sex Crazy was released in October 2020, featuring the two A-sides recorded with Centric. Interviewed for Vive Le Rock in 2020 to promote the album release, Centric's fellow Lurkers praised her contributions. Esso recalled "I asked her to join us for a few tracks or whatever, and I'm glad she did. I think she sounds great, it gave us a bit of a lift - she's a great singer." Moore concurred, "We were looking for a fresh feel at the time, so when she asked to meet Esso to talk about his book God's Lonely Men, I suggested she ask her if she like [sic] to do some vocals, she agreed and made a great job of "High Velocity" and "Electrical Guitar." I can't imagine anyone else singing "High Velocity."

Slady
- Origin: London, England
- Genres: Glam rock, tribute band
- Years active: 2018–present
- Label: Sladydor
- Members: Gobby Holder (Danie Cox/ Centric); Jem Lea (Wendy Solomon) ---- part-time: Our Friend Stan (Devid Woodcock)
- Past members: Davina Hill (Annie Needham); Donna Powell (Fiona Dulake); Donna Powell (Sophie Reed)

Centric also formed all-female Slade tribute band Slady, with drummer Fiona Dulake and bassist Wendy Solomon, who made their debut in Southend in November 2018. The band were later joined by guitarist Annie Needham and drummer Sophie Reed who replaced Dulake. Respectively, Centric, Solomon, Reed and Needham adopted the aliases Gobby Holder, Jem Lea. Donna Powell and Davina Hill in the band. Since February 2019, this project has been Centric's main focus and they played at Slade's main fan convention in Wolverhampton in October of 2019. They were listed in Metro as one of three "Acts To Catch This Christmas" in their 'Going Out' section.

A search for a new guitarist received press coverage in the Shropshire Star in 2022. The band recorded a studio session in August 2022 for a first single, a cover of Slade's "Merry Xmas Everybody" and custom composition "Slade Are For Life Not Just For Xmas" (by Slade fan John Barker). A video for the former was filmed in a Hoxton pub in October. The CD and download single were released and the video was premiered on Youtube on 1 December followed by a video for the second track on 14 January 2023. The band recorded their second single in April 2024 "Cum On Feel The Noize" b/w "Dig Me", the latter being the Featherz' song revisited, both being rerecordings of tracks from Five Year Itch. It was released 23 August 2024, followed by music videos of both tracks. The band recorded three tracks - "Coz I Luv You", "My Oh My" and the Featherz' "Do You Wanna Feel Free?"- for a third single. They also rerecorded "Merry Xmas Everybody" as an additional track for the new release. The other three already released songs were incorporated into the project to make it a seven track mini album "Coz I Luv You" on the label Wienerworld. A video of the title track was filmed at The Ship pub in Soho. Classic Rock magazine made the lead song one of their Tracks of the Week for 1 December 2025.

== Personnel ==
=== The Featherz ===
Current members

- Danie Cox/Centric – vocals/guitar
- Dazzle Monroe – drums

Former members

- Molly Spiers-MacLeod – bass
- Rachael Smith – drums
- Alex Gold - drums
- Alice Atkinson – bass
- Chris Shepherd - guitar
- Aryanne Maudit – guitar
- Lucy Lawbreaker – bass

=== Slady ===
Current members

- Danie Cox/Centric – vocals and guitar as "Gobby Holder"
- Wendy Solomon – bass as "Jem Lea"
- Drummers credited as "Donna Powell"
- Guitarists credited as "Davina Hill"

Part time member

- David Woodcock – keyboards

Former members

- Fiona Dulake – drums as "Donna Powell"
- Sophie Read – drums as "Donna Powell"
- Annie Needham – lead guitar as "Davina Hill"

== Discography ==
The Featherz discography
- Studio albums: 1
- EPs: 1
- Singles: 4
- Music videos: 9

The discography of The Featherz consists of one studio album (including some live material), one EP, four singles including the EP title track, nine music videos and one original appearance on another release.

A second studio album, recorded 2017–2018, remains unreleased.

Cox/Centric has also sung on two singles by The Lurkers and played guitar and sung on a mini album and two singles by Slady.

=== Album ===
- Five-Year-Itch (Flockrock Records, FRO1, 2017 - CD album only)
1. "Takes 1 2 Know 1" (Note: Tracks 1 and 2 previously released on Bandcamp 18 December 2014, recorded 2012 at Perry Vale Studios, produced by Pat Collier, previously circulated as radio singles)
2. "When I Fall In Love"
3. "RNR★" (Note: Tracks 3 and 4 were previously released on vinyl as the RNR★ single - see below)
4. "When Was The Last Time You Had Sex?"
5. "Dig Me" (Note: Tracks 5 and 6 were originally recorded at Broadoak Studios during the 2014 sessions for the "You" single, produced by Kevin Armstrong. Mixed by John Lucifer at Quadra Studios, February 2017)
6. "Chelsea"
7. "Bad Girl" (Note: Tracks 7 and 8 were recorded January 2016 at Seacroft Studios, Southend, for the studio's internet radio show, Live And Unsigned. Produced by Paul Finch)
8. "Party Crasher"
9. "Forget All You Know" (Note: Tracks 9–10 were previously released as an MP3 package as the "Forget All You Know" single. Tracks 12–14 are further material from the same session at Quadra Studios.)
10. "Moonage Daydream"
11. "Patience" (Live - Acoustic) (Note: Tracks 11 and 15–17 are live recordings made by Lucifer with official authority from the band.)
12. "Ballroom Blitz"
13. "Give Over Darling"
14. "Cum On Feel The Noize"
15. "Beat On The Brap" (Live)
16. "Hopeless Summer" (Live)
17. "Don't Dictate" (Live)

=== Singles/EP ===
- RNR★ (Charles Of London Records, COLRecords1, 2013, 7" vinyl only)
1. "RNR★"
2. "When Was The Last Time You Had Sex?"
- You (Charles Of London Records, COLR002, 2015, mp3s on Bandcamp plus CD single)
1. "You"
2. "Bad Girl"
- Forget All You Know (2016, mp3s on Bandcamp and iTunes. A CD single edition was planned, but did not materialize - instead the tracks were included on the Five-Year-Itch album.)
1. "Forget All You Know"
2. "Moonage Daydream"
- Ordinary Girl? EP (Flockrock Records, FRO2, 2017, Track 1 only mp3 single on Bandcamp and iTunes. 2018 CD EP of full release)
1. "Ordinary Girl?"
2. "Do You Wanna Feel Free?"
3. "20th Century Boy"
4. "When Was The Last Time You Had Sex?" (Live)
5. "Ordinary Girl?" (original mix)
6. "Bad Girl" (Live - Acoustic - bonus hidden track)

=== Compilations ===
- Hipsters 3 (Acid Jazz Records, AJX287, 2012, CD)
1. "Life Stranger" (also released as standalone mp3 on iTunes. Reissued on Bandcamp 18 December 2014)
- Teenage Rampage (Vive Le Rock, VIVE016, 2013, CD)
1. "RNR★"
- Redrock Festival 2016: All Day Rock Fest - National and International Bands 2nd Oct 2016 (Redwire, RED002, 2016 CD)
1. "Bad Girl"
- The Punk Lounge Presents.. Songs From The Sofa Volume 1 (The Punk Lounge, download on Bandcamp, 2018)
1. "You"

=== Other projects by Danie Cox/Centric ===
==== The Lurkers ====
See also The Lurkers discography

- High Velocity EP (Human Punk/Damaged Goods, DAMGOOD491-HP002, 2017, limited edition 500 copies on 7 inch pink vinyl)
1. "High Velocity" (single A side - two non-Centric tracks on B side)
- Electrical Guitar (Human Punk/Damaged Goods, 2019, limited edition 750 copies on 7 inch split black/clear vinyl) - UK Vinyl Singles chart no.1
1. Electrical Guitar
2. That Was Julia
- Sex Crazy (studio album, two Centric tracks) Damaged Goods DAMGOOD541 2020
7. High Velocity
11. Electrical Guitar

(Track 10 This is Your Revolution had also previously been recorded with Centric and performed live by The Featherz. The Lurkers recorded initial versions of several other tracks with Centric early in the album sessions.)

==== Slady ====
Slady discography
- Studio albums: 1
- Singles: 2
- Music videos: 6

Mini Album:

- Coz I Luv You (Wienerworld 2025)
1. "Coz I Luv You"
2. "Do You Wanna (Feel Free)" (The Featherz song)
3. "My Oh My"
4. "Cum On Feel The Noize"
5. "Dig Me" (The Featherz song)
6. "Merry Xmas Everybody"
7. "Slade Are For Life, (Not Just For Xmas)"

Singles:

- Merry Xmas Everybody (Sladydor, 5624, 2022, CD single and Download)
1. "Merry Xmas Everybody"
2. "Slade Are For Life, (Not Just For Christmas)" (by John Barker/Slady)
- Cum On Feel The Noize (Sladydor, 2024, CD single and Download)
1. "Cum On Feel The Noize"
2. "Dig Me" (The Featherz song)

== Videography ==
=== Music videos ===
The Featherz

Year	Song	Director	Notes	Sources
2012	"Life Stranger"	Rachael Smith	Only stills/snippets are reported as surviving of this video. Featured Cox in close-up performing the song with overlaid effects	
2013	"RNR★"	Julian Napier	Filmed at the Charles Of London Records launch party at Madame JoJo's October 2013	
2015	"You"	Dean Stockings	Stockings had previously directed music videos for Boy George featuring Cox	
2016	"Forget All You Know"	Danie Cox (Centric)	Filmed at the Railway Hotel, Southend, produced by Gaz De Vere	
2016	"Chelsea"	Dazzle Monroe	Filmed in Kings Road, Chelsea, London, December 2016	
2016	"Takes One To Know One"	Dazzle Monroe	Filmed at Winter Wonderland, London, 19 December 2016	
2017	"Moonage Daydream"	Dazzle Monroe	Released to commemorate the first anniversary of David Bowie's death	
2017	"Ordinary Girl?"	Danie Cox (Centric)	Dedicated to the memory of Imogen Goldie	
2018	"Chelsea" (live)	Suncan Stone (edited by Dazzle Monroe)	Official concert footage from Dublin Castle, Camden 20 April 2018	

Other projects by Danie Cox/Centric:

Year	Project	Song	Director	Notes	Sources
2017	The Lurkers	"High Velocity"	Roger Holdstock		
2022	Slady	"Merry Xmas Everybody"	Jason Reed	Dedicated to the memory of Slady's manager Dave Kemp who died of COVID-19 in December 2020	
2023	Slady	"Slade Are For Life (Not Just For Xmas)"	Jason Reed	Dedicated to the memory of Slady's manager Dave Kemp who died of COVID-19 in December 2020	
2024	Slady	"Cum On Feel The Noize"	Jason Reed		
2024	Slady	"Dig Me"	Jude Dulake		
2025	Slady	"Coz I Luv You"	Danie Cox, Wendy Soloman, Alan Doyle		
2026	Slady	"My Oh My"	Jamie Frazer	Filmed on tour in California	

Appearances by Danie Cox/Centric in other acts' official videos

Year	Band/Artist	Song	Role in video	Director	Notes	Sources
2011	Project B	"Disco Dollys"	Choreomania casualty	Jessica James	Filmed at The Shadow Lounge, London, inspired by 28 Days Later	
2012	Johnny Cola and the A-Grades	"Malborough Road"	Audience member at gig	Heidi Heelz, Jez Leather, Jonny Cola (Alex Poterill)	Also featured Molly Spiers McLeod in similar role.	
2013	Dharma Protocol ft A Boy Called George	"Coming Home"	Train Traveller	Dean Stockings	Brief cameo by Dazzle Monroe as another passenger	
2013	Boy George	"King Of Everything"	"Crying King"	Dean Stockings		
2014	Boy George	"My God"	Guitarist	Dean Stockings		

In addition, in 2015 Cox starred in and Monroe directed an unofficial video for "Never Marry A Railroadman" by Shocking Blue.

== Concert tours ==
=== Headlining ===
- November 2017 UK tour - four dates including London 100 Club support slot for The Members

=== Opening act ===
- Boy George's This Is What I Do UK tour, first leg - all seven dates (November 2013)
- The Damned's December 2015 UK tour - three dates plus afterparty for London date and headline show in Camden one night before opening date
- Healthy Junkies' Box of Chaos UK tour - four dates plus headline show in Southend two nights before opening date (June–July 2016)

In addition, as sidewomen in the Poussez Posse, the founding line-up of Cox, Smith and Spiers-MacLeod toured supporting Adam Ant's The Good the Mad and the Lovely UK tour - three dates including preview show (May 2011) Side project Slady toured with The Rezillos on their Summer 2022 national tour - three dates plus headline show in Brighton, day after final date (June 2022)
