= Blow Up Records =

British independent record label

- Founded: 4 May 1994; 32 years ago
- Founder: Paul Tunkin
- Distributors: Cargo Records (UK), Red Eye Distribution, Differ-Ant, Cargo Records GmbH, Goodfellas Distributions
- Genre: Various
- Country of origin: United Kingdom
- Location: London, England
- Official website: www.blowuprecords.com

Blow Up Records (or Blow Up) is a British independent record label that was established in London in May 1994 by Blow Up club founder and DJ Paul Tunkin. There is also an affiliated music publishing company Blow Up Songs.

Music genres of releases from the label include new wave, pop/rock and electronic music.

Notable releases include one of the first commercially available series of music library compilations 'Blow Up presents Exclusive Blend' (libraries featured include KPM, De Wolfe, Amphonic and Telemusic), 'Blow Up A-Go-Go: Dancefloor Classics' (Blow Up club compilation in conjunction with V2) and several series of limited seven inches featuring bands from across Europe and the UK. Blow Up also released the debut Add N to X album 'Vero Electronics' (1996). Current acts on the label roster include Big Boss Man, Baltic Fleet, The Bongolian, David Woodcock, Daiquiri Fantomas, Mockingbird, Wish Me Luck and Silvery.

Recent releases include 'Towers' (2012), the second album from Baltic Fleet which led to the artist winning the annual Liverpool Echo 'GIT Award' and a performance at Yoko Ono's Meltdown in 2013 which Bloomberg's Robert Heller described as "the psychedelic mid-point between Joy Division and Daft Punk".

== Artists ==
List of artists that have released material under Blow Up Records:

- Add N to X
- Alfa 9
- Aspic Boulevard
- Baltic Fleet
- Big Boss Man
- Capri
- CDOASS
- Cuff
- Daiquiri Fantomas
- David Woodcock
- Eight Legs
- Fay Hallam
- Guy Pedersen
- Katerine
- Komeda
- Lucky 15
- Mockingbird, Wish Me Luck
- Neon Plastix
- Noonday Underground
- Silvery
- Stereo Total
- Strip Music
- The Bongolian
- The Elevators
- The Frank Popp Ensemble
- The Rifles
- The Weekenders
- VA6

== Discography ==
List of Blow Up Records releases (incomplete):

=== Albums ===
- BU004/BLOWUP004 – "Vero Electronics", Add N to X (January 1996)
- BU006/BLOWUP006 – "Blow Up Presents Exclusive Blend Volume 1", Various Artists (August 1996)
- BU011 – "Blow Up Presents Exclusive Blend Volume 2", Various Artists (December 1997)
- GOGO – "Blow Up A-Go-Go! Dancefloor Classics from the Legendary Blow Up Club", Various Artists (December 1997)
- BU019 – "Blow Up Presents Exclusive Blend Volume 3", Various Artists (October 2000)
- BU024 – "Blow Up Presents Exclusive Blend Volume 4", Various Artists (October 2001)
- BU040 – "Outer Bongolia", The Bongolian (February 2008)
- BU041 – "Baltic Fleet", Baltic Fleet (March 2008)
- BU050 – "Full English Beat Breakfast", Big Boss Man (September 2009)
- BU054 – "Awesome Moves", Neon Plastix (May 2010)
- BU057 – "Railway Architecture", Silvery (August 2010)
- BU060 – "Bongos For Beatniks", The Bongolian (May 2011)
- BU066 – "Gone To Ground", Alfa 9 (March 2013)
- BU067 – "Lost in Sound", Fay Hallam & The Bongolian (June 2012)
- BU068 – "Towers", Baltic Fleet (August 2012)
- BU078 – "MHz Invasion", Daiquiri Fantomas (August 2013)
- BU089 – "David Woodcock", David Woodcock (August 2014)
- BU090 – "Last Man on Earth", Big Boss Man (September 2014)
- BU099 – "Yéyé Existentialiste", Stereo Total (June 2015)
- BU101 – "Corona", Fay Hallam (October 2015)
- BU102 – "Moog Maximus", The Bongolian (July 2016)
- BU107 – "The Dear One", Baltic Fleet (October 2016)

=== Singles ===
- BLOWUP001 – "All Grown Up", The Weekenders (May 1994) [7"]
- BLOWUP002 – "Man of Leisure", The Weekenders (March 1995) [7"]
- BLOWUP003 – "Inelegantly Wasted in Papa's Penthouse Pad in Belgravia", The Weekenders (June 1995) [7", CD]
- BLOWUP007 – "He Plays Like A Disease", VA6 (August 1996) [7"]
- BU008 – "Snowflakes in Hawaii"/"Mon Coeur Balance", Lucky 15/Katerine (April 1997) [7"]
- BU013 – "Boogie Woogie/Rock'n'Roll", Komeda (April 1998) [7"]
- BU017 – "Sea Groove", Big Boss Man (April 2001) [7"]
- BU021 – "The Light Brigade"/"Hello", Noonday Underground (February 2001) [7"]
- BU029 – "Peace And Quiet", The Rifles (March 2005) [7"]
- BU085 – "Beggars Can't Be Choosers"/"Tease", David Woodcock (November 2013) [7"]

=== EPs ===
- BU080 – "The Wilds", Baltic Fleet (May 2013)
- BU095 – "The Adventures of You and Me EP", David Woodcock (February 2015)
