= Baltic Fleet (band) =

Baltic Fleet is the work of Warrington-based musician Paul Fleming. Baltic Fleet released his self-titled debut album in 2008 on UK independent label Blow Up Records. The album was named in Rough Trade's top 50 albums of 2008 at number 29. Fleming produced the album using a laptop and any instruments that came to hand whilst he toured with Liverpool post punk band Echo & The Bunnymen. Fleming has also played keyboards on Echo & The Bunnymen studio albums Siberia and The Fountain.

Baltic Fleet influences include Brian Eno's album My Life in the Bush of Ghosts, David Bowie's album Low, Neu!, The Virgin Suicides and Erik Satie. The band is named after a pub in Liverpool. Clash magazine have described Baltic Fleet as an audio diarist, due to the transient nature of his production.

Collaborators of Baltic Fleet have included Will Sergeant of Echo & The Bunnymen and Simon Finley from Sound of Guns. The debut album was mixed by Nick Terry who has previously mixed albums for The Klaxons and Simian Mobile Disco. Baltic Fleet only played one live show to promote the album at The Paradiso, Amsterdam with Florence and the Machine and The Ting Tings.

The second Baltic Fleet album, Towers was released in 2012 on Blow Up Records, following which Baltic Fleet won the annual Liverpool Echo 'GIT Award' and was nominated for 'Album of the Year' in the Liverpool Music Awards.

The third Baltic Fleet album, The Dear One was released on 11 November 2016.
