= The Lurkers =

British punk rock band

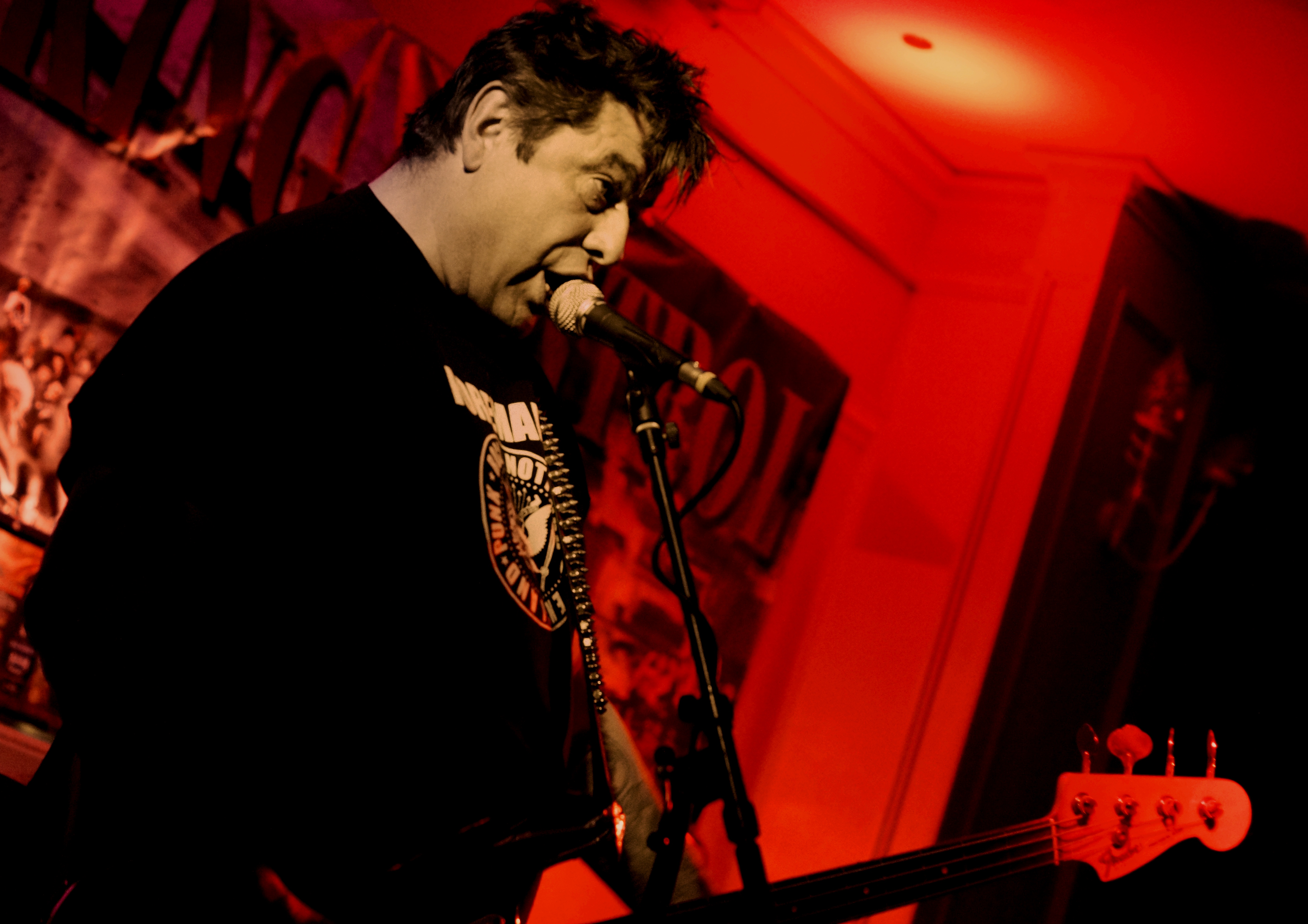
- Arturo Bassick in 2013

Background information
- Origin: Uxbridge, London, England
- Genres: Punk rock; new wave; pop-punk
- Years active: 1976–1979; 1982–1984; 1987–1997; 1999–present
- Labels: Beggars Banquet; Clay; Damaged Goods
- Members: Pete "Manic Esso" Haynes; Nigel Moore; Pete Stride; Danie Centric (formerly Cox)
- Past members: Arturo Bassick; Dave Kemp; Stuart Meadows; Howard Wall; Kym Bradshaw; Marc Fincham; Billy Gilbert; Damo Waters; Dan Tozer; Nelly; Tom Spencer; Craig Casson; Steve Straughan; Pete "Plug" Edwards

The Lurkers are a British punk rock band from Uxbridge, West London. They were the first group to be on Beggars Banquet Records for whom they released two albums, the first of which charted in the UK Albums Chart, while five singles also charted in the UK singles chart.

== Career ==
The Lurkers formed in 1976, originally consisting of Pete Stride on guitar, Pete "Manic Esso" Haynes on drums, Pete "Plug" Edwards on vocals and Nigel Moore on bass. Edwards was replaced by Howard Wall after a few rehearsals, with him becoming the band's road manager. Stride was the band's main songwriter. The band played their first gig at Uxbridge Technical College in December supporting Screaming Lord Sutch to an audience of 10. The band were one of the early punk bands that played live in the first few months of the Roxy Club in London. Moore was swiftly replaced by Arturo Bassick. They supported The Jam in February 1977, Eater in March, and Slaughter & The Dogs in April.

The Lurkers recorded four sessions at Maida Vale Studios for John Peel at BBC Radio 1, between 1977 and 1979. Their debut single "Shadow", the first release on Beggars Banquet Records, was voted by John Peel's listeners as twelfth best track of the year in 1977's Festive Fifty. with "Love Story", the B-side, at number 31. Bassick left the band after this first single, and was replaced by former Saints member Kym Bradshaw, who left before the recording of the third single, 1978's "Ain't Got a Clue"/"Ooh, Ooh I Love You" which saw the return of Moore to the band. That single was their biggest hit, reaching No. 45 on the UK singles chart.

The following month, the band's debut album, Fulham Fallout, reached No.57 on the UK Albums Chart. One reviewer described it as "by far their best with production that really makes the guitar kick. It's sloppy and amateurish, but that's what makes it so great." "Be My Prisoner", a song from the album, also appeared on Streets, a 1977 compilation album of early UK punk bands from a variety of independent record labels.

In January 1979, The Lurkers' fifth single, "Just Thirteen", was released, and in 2001 it was included in Mojo magazine's list of the best punk rock singles of all time. A month after the release of this single, The Lurkers' track "I'm on Heat" appeared, alongside songs by more famous bands like The Jam and The Stranglers, on the punk compilation 20 of Another Kind (Polydor, POLS 1006). The album reached number 45 in the UK chart. Another of the band's tracks, "Out in the Dark", appeared on the follow-up 20 of Another Kind Volume 2.

The band's second album was not as well received, critically or commercially, as their debut, and the band split for a few years. Pete Stride collaborated with 'Honest' John Plain (of English punk band the Boys) and released an album in January 1980. In 1982, Stride re-formed the Lurkers. They signed for Stoke-on-Trent-based label Clay Records, for whom they released four singles and one album. The band broke up again in 1984.

In the years since, they have reunited with various members, and continue to record and perform around the world to this day. Their legacy, however, is primarily based on their late 1970s output. "Shadow", "Ain't Got a Clue", and "Just Thirteen" in particular are cited by punk cognoscenti as classic examples of the style, and still show up from time to time on genre overview compilations. The current line-up is: Bassick (bass and vocals) who also plays for 999, Dave Kemp (guitar) and Stuart Meadows (drums). In January 2009 the band supported punk legends the Buzzcocks on fourteen dates of their UK tour. All Lurkers studio albums released between 1988 and 2008 were made by Arturo Bassick's incarnation of the band.

In the 2010s, Esso, Stride and Moore collaborated again, initially under the name of The Lurkers: God's Lonely Men before later reverting to just The Lurkers. They released a CD in 2012 entitled Chemical Landslide which contained tracks considered a lot heavier than anything they had previously recorded under the Lurkers name. In 2016 they released a further album The Future's Calling and collaborated on follow-up material with The Featherz' lead singer Danie Cox. The fruit of the collaboration with Cox – the single A Side High Velocity – was released on 24 November 2017 as a limited edition of 500 copies on 7-inch pink vinyl. and the band recorded further material with Cox in December 2017. By February 2018 Cox, now known as Danie Centric, was enlisted as long-term vocalist for Esso, Stride and Moore's version of the band (while also continuing with The Featherz, with whom, during their set at the 2018 Rebellion Festival, she previewed live a new Lurkers song, "This Is Your Revolution.") The band's second single with Centric – "Electrical Guitar"/"That Was Julia" was released in January 2019 and topped the UK Vinyl Singles chart. Parent album Sex Crazy was released in October 2020.

In May 2021, Arturo Bassick disbanded his version of The Lurkers after 34 years, deciding to concentrate his live performances on his work with the band 999. They had played their final gigs in March 2020 prior to the COVID-19 pandemic. This effectively rendered the alternate version of the band as the sole active embodiment.

== Lineups ==
Period	Members	Releases
1976	Howard Wall – vocals; Nigel Moore – bass; Pete Stride – guitar; Pete 'Manic Esso' Haynes – drums	None
1976	Howard Wall – vocals; Arturo Bassick – bass; Pete Stride – guitar; Pete 'Manic Esso' Haynes – drums	"Shadow" (Single); "Freak Show" (Single)
1977	Howard Wall – vocals; Kym Bradshaw – bass; Pete Stride – guitar; Pete 'Manic Esso' Haynes – drums	None
1977–1980	Howard Wall – vocals; Nigel Moore – bass; Pete Stride – guitar; Pete 'Manic Esso' Haynes – drums	"Fullham Fallout" (1978 Album); "God's Lonely Men" (1979 Album); plus 5 singles and "Live and Loud!" album issued in 1989
1980–1982		
1982–1983	Marc Fincham – vocals; Nigel Moore – bass; Pete Stride – guitar; Pete 'Manic Esso' Haynes – drums	"This Dirty Town" (1983 Album); plus 5 singles
1983-1987		
1987	Arturo Bassick – vocals; Nigel Moore – bass; Pete Stride – guitar; Pete 'Manic Esso' Haynes – drums	None
1987–1991	Arturo Bassick – vocals; Nigel Moore – bass; Pete Stride – guitar; Dan Tozer – drums	"Wild Times Again" (1988 Album); Don't Ask Me (Single)
1991–1994	Arturo Bassick – vocals & bass; Pete Stride – guitar; Dan Tozer – drums	"Non-Stop Nitropop" (1994 Album); plus "Live in Berlin" live album
1995–1998	Arturo Bassick – vocals & bass; Tom Spencer – guitar; Dan Tozer – drums	"Ripped N Torn" (1995 Album)
1999	Arturo Bassick – vocals, bass & guitar; El Damo Waters – drums	Go Ahead Punk (Single)
2001–2002	Arturo Bassick – vocals & bass; David Rabid Kemp – guitar; El Damo Waters – drums	"On Heat" live album
2003	Arturo Bassick – vocals & bass; Billy Gilbert – guitar; Robert Nelly Hunter – drums	"26 Years" (2003 Album)
2004	Arturo Bassick – vocals & bass; Tom Spencer – guitar; Robert Nelly Hunter – drums	"Live Freak Show" live album
2004–2008	Arturo Bassick – vocals & bass; David Rabid Kemp – guitar; Robert Nelly Hunter – drums	"Fried Brains" (2008 Album)
2009	Arturo Bassick – vocals & bass; Steve Racket – guitar; Craig Casson – drums	Touring line up only
2010–2017	Arturo Bassick – vocals & bass; David Rabid Kemp – guitar; Stuart Meadows – drums	Last regular line-up of Arturo's Lurkers
2012–2016	Pete Stride – vocals, guitar; Nigel Moore – bass; Pete 'Manic Esso' Haynes – drums	"Chemical Landslide" (2012 Album – released under the band name GLC); "The Future's Calling" (2016 Album – released under the band name The Lurkers GLC)
2017–2021	Arturo Bassick – vocals & bass; David Rabid Kemp – guitar; Craig Casson – drums	Touring line-up only
2017 – Present	Danie Cox – vocals; Pete Stride – vocals, guitar; Nigel Moore – bass; Pete 'Manic Esso' Haynes – drums	"Sex Crazy" (2020 Album); plus two singles to date

== Discography ==
=== Albums ===
==== Studio albums ====
- Fulham Fallout (June 1978: Beggars Banquet, BEGA 2) # 57 UK Albums Chart
- God's Lonely Men (April 1979: Beggars Banquet, BEGA 8)
- This Dirty Town (July 1983: Clay Records, CLAY 104)
- Wild Times Again (Feb. 1988: Weser) released by Arturo Bassick's incarnation of The Lurkers
- King of the Mountain (June 1989: Link) released by Arturo Bassick's incarnation of The Lurkers
- Powerjive (October 1990: Released Emotions) released by Arturo Bassick's incarnation of The Lurkers
- Non-Stop Nitropop (November 1994: Weser) released by Arturo Bassick's incarnation of The Lurkers
- Ripped 'N' Torn (1995: Step 1) released by Arturo Bassick's incarnation of The Lurkers
- 26 Years (2003: Captain Oi! Ahoy 229) released by Arturo Bassick's incarnation of The Lurkers
- Fried Brains (2008: Captain Oi! Ahoy 301) released by Arturo Bassick's incarnation of The Lurkers
- Chemical Landslide (2012 Unlatched Records, reissued 2022 Damaged Goods)
- The Future's Calling (2016: Unlatched Records UL002, reissued 2022 Damaged Goods)
- Sex Crazy (2020 Damaged Goods DAMGOOD541)

==== Compilation albums ====
- Last Will and Testament – Greatest Hits (November 1980)
- Totally Lurkered (Dojo, December 1992) released by Arturo Bassick's incarnation of The Lurkers
- The Beggars Banquet Punk Singles (Anagram, May 1997)
- Take Me Back to Babylon (Receiver, December 1997)
- First Ever Demos 1977 (Damaged Goods 2023)

==== Live albums ====
- Live and Loud (Link, November 1989) released by Arturo Bassick's incarnation of The Lurkers
- Live in Berlin (Released Emotions, June 1992) released by Arturo Bassick's incarnation of The Lurkers
- Freakshow Live (Kotumba Records 2004) released by Arturo Bassick's incarnation of The Lurkers
- Live at the Queens Hotel, Margate 23rd December 1977 (Damaged Goods, May 2023)

=== Compilation appearances (selective) ===
Listing of those various artist compilation albums mentioned in the text of the main article:

- "Be My Prisoner" featured on the Streets compilation album (End of 1977: Beggars Banquet BEGA1)
- "I'm on Heat" featured on the 20 of Another Kind compilation album (1979: Polydor Records POLX-1) UK No. 45 UK Albums Chart

=== Singles ===
- "Shadow" / "Love Story" (July 1977: Beggars Banquet, BEG 1)
- "Freak Show" / "Mass Media Believer" (October 1977: Beggars Banquet, BEG 2)
- "Ain't Got a Clue" / "Ooh Ooh I Love You" (May 1978: Beggars Banquet, BEG 6) # 45 UK singles chart
- "I Don't Need to Tell Her" / "Pills" (July 1978: Beggars Banquet, BEG 9) # 49
- "Just Thirteen" / "Countdown" (January 1979: Beggars Banquet, BEG 14) # 66
- Out in the Dark EP: "Cyanide" / "Suzie Is a Floozie" / "Cyanide" (pub version) (May 1979: Beggars Banquet, BEG 19) # 72
- "New Guitar in Town" / "Pick Me Up" / "Little Ol' Wine Drinker Me" (November 1979: Beggars Banquet, BEG 28) # 72
- "Shadow" / "Love Story" / "Freak Show" / "Mass Media Believer" (1979: Beggars Banquet, BACK 1) double-7" pack
- "I Don't Need to Tell Her" / "Pills" / "Just Thirteen" / "Countdown" (1979: Beggars Banquet, BACK 3) double-7" pack
- "This Dirty Town" / "Wolf at the Door" (June 1982: Clay, CLAY 12)
- "Drag You Out" / "Heroin (It's All Over)" (November 1982: Clay, CLAY 17)
- "Frankenstein Again" / "One Man's Meat..." (February 1983: Clay)
- Final Vinyl EP: "Let's Dance Now (No Time to Be Strangers)" / "Midnight Hour" / "By the Heart" / "Frankenstein Again" (March 1984: Clay)
- "Let's Dance Now" / "Midnight Hour" (May 1984: Clay, CLAY 32)
- "Go Ahead Punk" / "Lucky John" (Empty Records, 1999)
- "High Velocity" (featuring Danie Cox) /"White Noise and Feedback"/"One Butterfly" (November 2017 Human Punk / Damaged Goods)
- "Electrical Guitar" / "That Was Julia" (both tracks featuring Danie Centric) (January 2019 Human Punk / Damaged Goods) – UK Vinyl Singles chart #1
- "Fits You Like a Glove"/ "When You Are Borderline" (September 2020, Damaged Goods)
- "The Boys in the Corner" / "We Close The Door" (April 2021, Damaged Goods)
- "Nearly Home (Turning Pages)" (April 2022, Damaged Goods, taken from The Future's Calling, 2016)

== See also ==
- List of punk bands from the United Kingdom
- List of 1970s punk rock musicians
- List of Peel Sessions
