= David Woodcock (musician) =

British musician

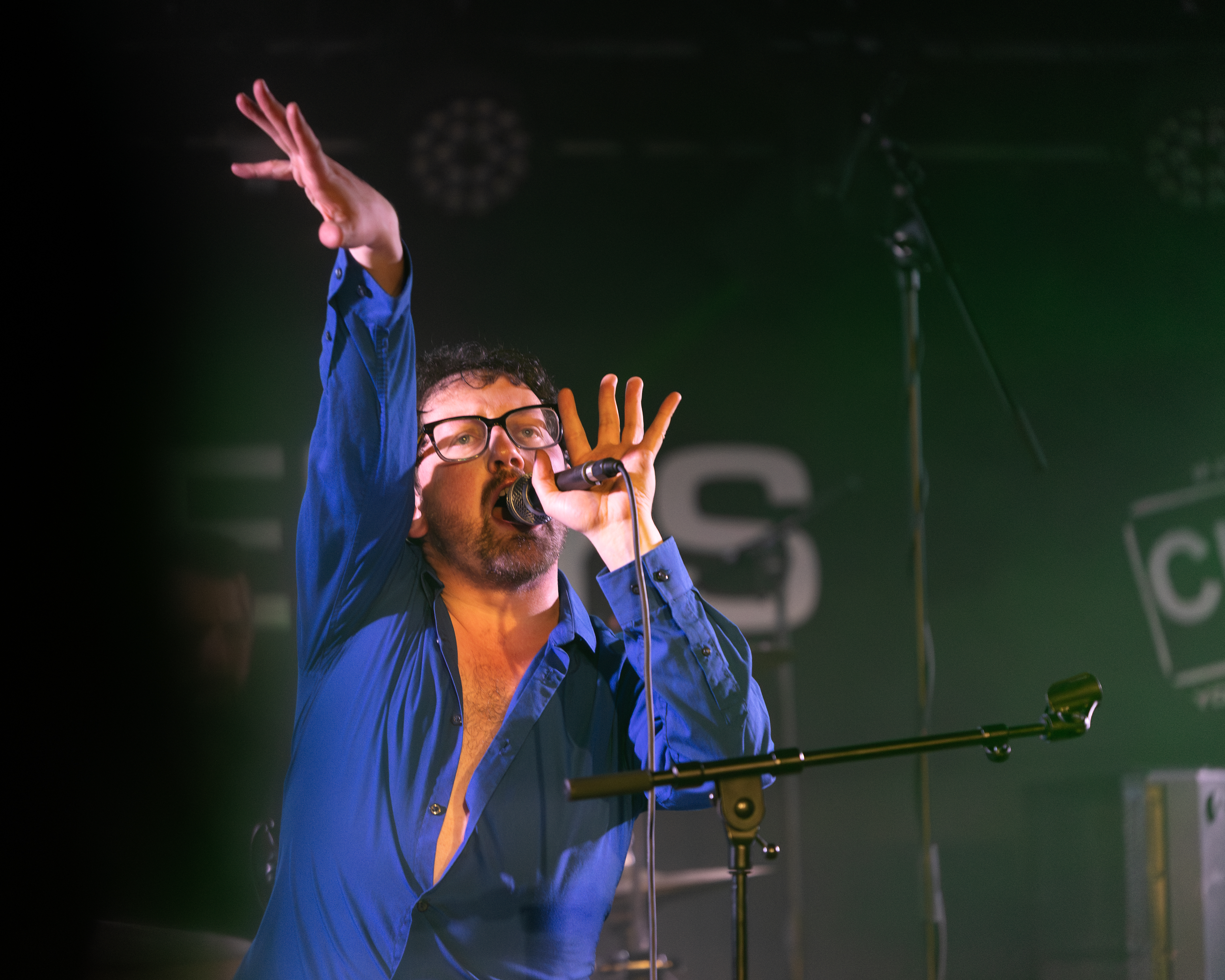
- David Woodcock performs at Chinnerys Southend, May 25, 2025

Background information
- Origin: Southend-on-Sea, Essex, England
- Genres: Indie, Britpop, alternative rock
- Occupation(s): Musician, songwriter
- Instrument(s): Vocals, guitar, keyboards, synthesiser
- Labels: Thank Dog Records, Blow Up Records
- Website: davidwoodcockmusic.com

David Woodcock is an English singer-songwriter and musician, currently based in his hometown of Southend-on-Sea.

== Biography ==
Woodcock released his debut single "Same Things" in 2013 and his self-titled debut album in August 2014 on Blow Up Records.

His singles "Same Things", "Beggars Can't Be Choosers" and "Open Secret" have received national airplay on stations including BBC 6 Music and Xfm, and Woodcock also recorded a live session for Marc Riley on BBC 6 Music in August 2014. His most recent single, "Relatively Single Man", was the winner of BBC 6 Music's Rebel Playlist with 52% of the public vote.

His third album, "Pictures Of Me" was released in 2023 on Thank Dog Records. Giving it 4/5, the Daily Mirror called the album 'bittersweet vignettes of love'.

Record Collector editor Ian McCann said of David: "David Woodcock is a talent, in the classic Brit songwriter tradition. Every observation is honed to perfection" and BBC 6 Music DJ Steve Lamacq described David as "Part Stiff Records, part Brit Pop. A reckless Stephen Duffy or an Essex Jarvis Cocker".

Live, Woodcock performs both solo or with a band with a fluid line up of musicians, some of whom also appear on his albums. Currently his band The Fixtures – comprise Joe Blamey (drums), Wendy Solomon (bass) and Mark Elliott (guitar)

He recorded a new 6Music session for Riley and Coe on 28th February 2024

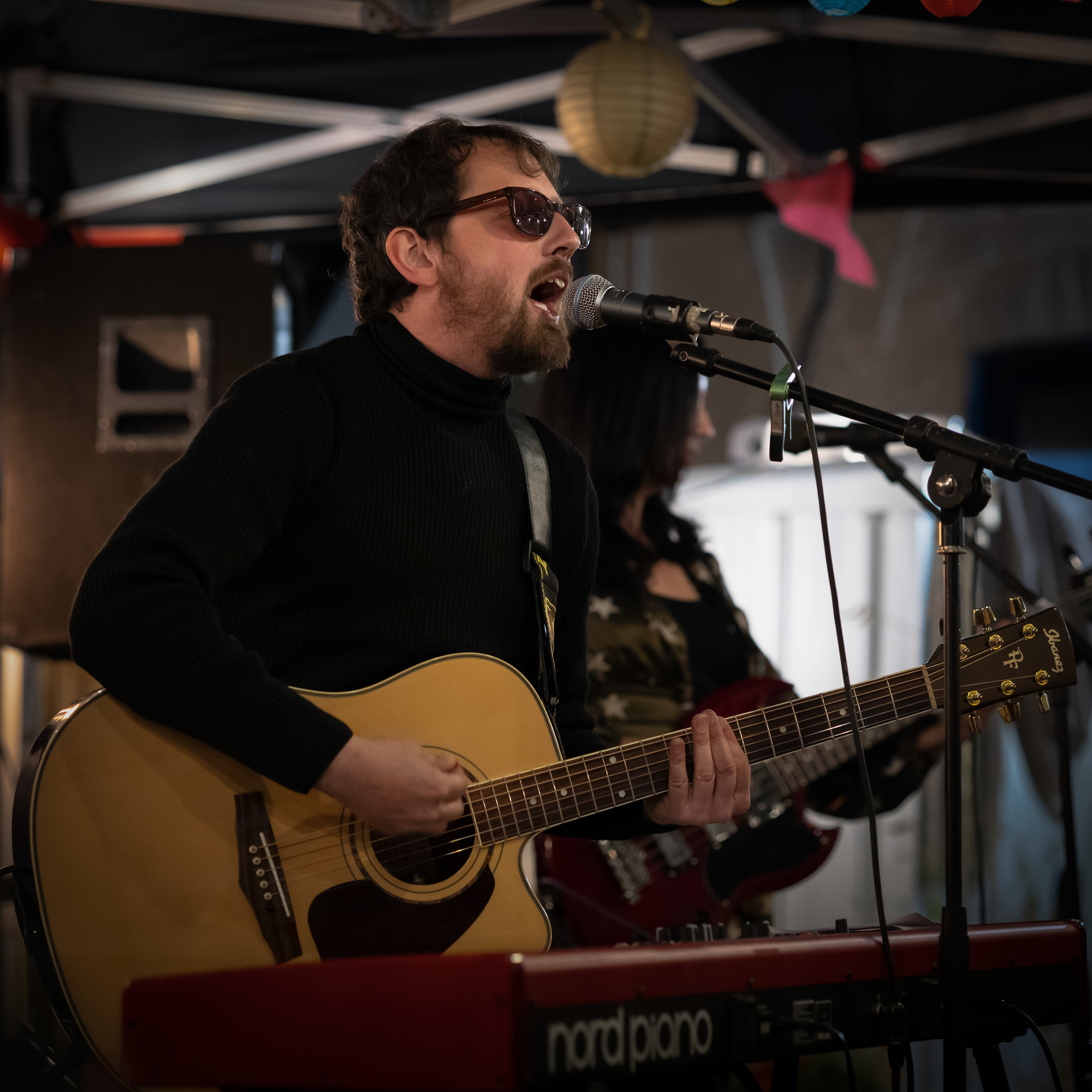
David Woodcock performs with his band, the Fixtures, at the Temple Café, in Leigh-on-Sea, August, 27, 2021

His partner, Wendy Solomon, fronts her own band Angel and the Melodyhorns who have released one album Exposure. She also appears as "Jem Lea", bassist with all-female Slade tribute band Slady (fronted by The Featherz' lead singer/guitarist Danie Cox as "Gobby Holder".) Woodcock has played guitar with the Melodyhorns and occasionally guests on keyboards with Slady, with whom he is billed as "Our Friend Stan.". In late 2023 "Holder", "Lea" and "Stan" formed a three piece acoustic supplementary version of Slady for smaller bar gigs.
