= Sonia Bassey =

UK artist and organiser

Sonia Bassey MBE (also known as Sonia Bassey-Williams) from Liverpool, UK, is a community artist, organiser and has been Director of Public Sector Transformation Cheshire and Warrington for Cheshire East Council from 2020. Bassey was appointed an MBE in 2017 for service to the community

== Career ==
Bassey became self-employed as a community artist when she was 19. In 2011 she curated the project Toxteth Riots – 30 Years On, a major photographic exhibition with Merseyside Black History Month that was installed at National Museums Liverpool International Slavery Museum. She has subsequently worked for Cheshire West and Chester Council and in 2019 joined Cheshire East council to become Director of Public Sector Transformation for Cheshire and Warrington in 2020.

She has been chair of the Merseyside Black History Month Group. In 2019 she was elected as chair of the board of trustees for the annual Africa Oyé festival in Liverpool, the biggest African live music event in the UK, after being a member of the board for eighteen months. She is also chair of Mandela8, a charitable incorporated organisation with the objective of installing an artwork in Prince's Park, Liverpool to commemorate and celebrate the legacy of Nelson Mandela. In October 2020 she was one of the people selected to be shown on posters around Liverpool in the You Cannot Be What You Cannot See campaign as part of Black History Month. In 2021 she was elected the chair of the RESPECT group of National Museums Liverpool, set up in 2008 with the newly opened International Slavery Museum to consider race equality issues, community engagement and inclusive practices.

== Awards ==
Bassey was appointed an MBE in 2017 for service to the community. She thought carefully before deciding to accept the award. She was shortlisted for a Lifetime Achievers prize in the National Diversity Awards in 2020 in the context of her work promoting social justice and equality. These awards were postponed until September 2021 due to the COVID-19 pandemic.

== Personal life ==
Bassey was born in 1965. She was brought up in the Toxteth area where there were low expectations for the career paths of young people. She gained an MBA in Executive Leadership and Business Administration from Liverpool John Moores University in 2010.
