= Sweet (film) =

- The Sweet title sequence.
- Directed by: James Pilkington
- Written by: James Pilkington
- Produced by: Robert Mercer
- Starring: Noel Fielding; Julian Barratt; Suzy Bloom
- Narrated by: Noel Fielding
- Cinematography: Jim Solan
- Edited by: Bruce Townend
- Music by: Big Boss Man
- Release date: 2000
- Running time: 10 minutes
- Country: United Kingdom
- Language: English

Sweet is a 2000 short film directed by James Pilkington starring Noel Fielding and Julian Barratt that is set in Camden, London.

== Overview ==
Sweet is an early collaboration of the Mighty Boosh comedy duo Julian Barratt and Noel Fielding, and is featured in the extras of the Mighty Boosh series 2 DVD. It is narrated by Noel Fielding as Pete Sweet, and tells the story of his torrid relationship with Poppy, the imaginary sister of his friend Dave. After meeting in a club, the sexually adventurous Pete and Poppy go out for a while, until Poppy reveals herself to be pregnant and they cool it off. Pete then meets a real girl named Daisy, whom he immediately starts dating. Poppy later reveals that she was never pregnant at all, and Pete picks back up with her, dating both girls at once. His best mate Stitch is jealous of him, and informs Daisy that Pete is seeing another girl, leading her to storm into his flat to find him having sex with Poppy. He attempts to explain, but Daisy is "really understanding," and they start up a three-way relationship. Soon, though, Daisy seems to become rather too fond of Poppy, and they end up dating alone, without Pete. Furious at Stitch for ruining his relationship (as he sees it), he finds him in a bar and starts to beat him up. Stitch, however, reveals that he was jealous not of Pete but of the two girls, and that he had wanted Pete himself all along. The short ends with the two of them in bed together, Pete wearing his motorbike helmet, and Stitch a pair of nipple clamps whilst drinking from a bottle of whiskey.

The entire musical score is performed by Big Boss Man.

== Cast ==
- Noel Fielding as Pete Sweet
- Julian Barratt as Stitch
- Suzy Bloom as Daisy
- Toby Walton as Dave
- Coral Lorne as Old Lady #1
- Glenys Mayo as Old Lady #2
- Bulla as Puppy #1
- Suki as Puppy #2

== Awards ==
- Kodak Short Film Showcase 2002
- TCM Awards 2001
- F.A.C.E Award (Film Award for Cinematic Excellence) 2001

== Cultural References ==
The 'Don't touch me' routine performed by Barratt and Fielding, first seen in Sweet, is also featured in The Mighty Boosh pilot, Hitcher, and in The Mighty Boosh 2006 tour.
