= Fried Brains =

Studio album by The Lurkers
- Released: 13 May 2008
- Recorded: 2008
- Genre: Punk rock
- Length: 41:19
- Label: Captain Oi! Records

The Lurkers chronology
26 Years (2003)	Fried Brains (2008)	Chemical Landslide (2012)

Alternative cover
- Cover of the Vinyl release

Professional ratings
Review scores
Source	Rating
AllMusic	4/5 stars
IGN	(7.9/10)
Ox Fanzine	favourable
Razorcake	favourable

Fried Brains is the tenth studio album by punk rock band The Lurkers. The album was released on Vinyl, CD and as digital download. The first seven tracks of the album appeared on side A of the vinyl and the other 7 on side B in the same order as below, the vinyl had alternate album art work. The Album received positive reviews, Razorcake stated the album was not a return to the original sound but 'a mighty fine punk rock album circa 2008'.

== Track listing ==
1. "Come And Reminisce" - 2:07
2. "You're Gone" - 3:00
3. "Why Are You So Happy To Give Your Mind Away?" - 2:10
4. "Sick Transit" - 3:16
5. "Moved Away" - 3:09
6. "Why Were You That Way?" - 2:06
7. "Too Late To Change" - 3:09
8. "Time To Wake Up" - 2:50
9. "Go Forward" - 1:47
10. "Little Ole Wine Drinker Mills, Jennings" - 2:35
11. "Cheryl Bunkur" - 3:08
12. "Revenge Of The Dogs" - 4:22
13. "Punk Rock Brought Us Together" 3:21
14. "Fried Brains" - 4:27

== Personnel ==
- Arturo Bassick - Bass, Vocals
- Nelly - Drums
- Dave Kemp - Guitar, Backing Vocals
