= 26 Years (album) =

Studio album by The Lurkers
- Released: 25 November 2003
- Recorded: June – July 2003
- Genre: Punk rock
- Length: 39:12
- Label: Captain Oi!, SOS, Street Dogs

The Lurkers chronology
Ripped 'n' Torn (1995)	26 Years (2003)	Fried Brains (2008)

Professional ratings
Review scores
Source	Rating
Razorcake	neutral

26 Years is the ninth studio album by punk rock band The Lurkers. The CD release of the album by the Street Dogs Record label also has an additional eight tracks, a single release of "Go Ahead Harry" from 1999 with the accompanying B-side and 6 tracks recorded live from their performance in Newcastle in 2003. The album contains a few re-recordings of old Lurkers tracks including their notable single "Mass Media Believer". The album spawned what could be somewhat of a modern classic for The Lurkers in the shape of "Go Ahead Punk". The album art was created by Richard Stone.

== Track listing ==
No.	Title	Length
1.	"Ready and Loaded"	2:36
2.	"Can´t Connect"	2:01
3.	"Waste Of Space"	3:06
4.	"In Richmond"	2:36
5.	"Conspiracy"	2:45
6.	"Misery"	2:18
7.	"26 Years"	2:43
8.	"Go Ahead Punk"	2:28
9.	"Stop Her Coming Back"	2:43
10.	"Trance Meeting"	3:05
11.	"Go Sane"	2:51
12.	"Roll Out The Barrel"	3:13
13.	"Mass Media Believer"	2:07
14.	"Funny Farm"	2:33
15.	"Never Use That Gun"	2:17

== Personnel ==
- Arturo Bassick (Arthur Billingsley) - bass, vocals
- Billy Gilbert - guitar
- Nelly Drums (Robert Hunter) - drums
