= This Is What I Do =

This Is What I Do may refer to:

- This Is What I Do (Sonny Rollins album), a 2000 album by Sonny Rollins
- This Is What I Do (Boy George album), a 2013 album by Boy George
