= Fulham Fallout =

Album by The Lurkers

Studio album by The Lurkers
- Released: June 1978
- Studios: The Old Smithy Recording Studio, Kempsey, Worcestershire
- Genre: Punk rock
- Label: Beggars Banquet
- Producer: Mick Glossop

The Lurkers chronology
Fulham Fallout (1978)	God's Lonely Men (1979)

Fulham Fallout is the studio debut album of UK punk band The Lurkers. The original album was released in June 1978 on the Beggar's Banquet label and hit number 57 on the UK Album Chart in its first week. The re-release on Captain Oi! Records added another twelve tracks of singles and demos to the original set of fourteen tracks.

== Track listing ==
1. "Ain't Got a Clue" (Stride)
2. "I Don't Need to Tell Her" (Stride)
3. "Total War" (Stride)
4. "Hey You" (Bradshaw)
5. "Shadow" (Stride)
6. "Then I Kicked Her" (Phil Spector, Ellie Greenwich, Jeff Barry)
7. "Go, Go, Go" (Moore)
8. "Jenny" (Stride)
9. "Time of Year" (Stride)
10. "Self Destruct" (Stride)
11. "It's Quiet Here" (Esso, Stride)
12. "Gerald" (The Lurkers)
13. "I'm on Heat" (Stride)
14. "Be My Prisoner" (Stride)

CD Reissue Included

1. "Shadow" (Single Version)
2. "Love Story"
3. "Freak Show"
4. "Mass Media Believer"
5. "Ooh! Ooh! I Love You"
6. "Pills" (Bo Diddley)
7. "We Are the Chaos Bros."
8. "Be My Prisoner" (Streets Compilation version)
9. "Total War" (Demo)
10. "Then I Kissed Her" ("Then I Kicked Her" Demo)
11. "I Love the Dark" (LP Demo)
12. "Freak Show" (LP Demo)

== Personnel ==
- Howard Wall - vocals
- Pete Stride - guitar, vocals
- Peter "Esso" Haynes - drums, vocals, glockenspiel
- Nigel Moore - bass, vocals
- Pete "Plug" Edwards - harmonica, backing vocals

== Charts ==
Chart (1978)	Peak position
UK Albums (Official Charts)	57
