= Suzy Bloom =

British actress

Suzy Bloom is a film and stage actress whose credits range from West End plays and musicals to BAFTA nominated film and mainstream television drama.

She starred as Daisy, alongside Noel Fielding and Julian Barratt in the BAFTA nominated short film Sweet by James A. Pilkington.

== Career ==
Bloom has appeared in Fawlty Towers: The Play at the Apollo Theatre in London's West End. She played Miss Gilbert in Emma (2020) (Universal Pictures) and Catherine in The Art Of Love (Netflix). Bloom played Dotty/Mrs Clackett in Noises Off (standing in for Meera Syal) at the Garrick Theatre; she also played Belinda (standing in for Sarah Hadland).

Bloom is known for playing roles in comedy, and was standby to Dawn French and Jennifer Saunders in their respective roles at the London Palladium pantomimes Jack and the Beanstalk and Peter Pan. The comedy sketch show pilot Skitches is written by, created and stars Bloom, Helen Goldwyn and Annalea Doyle.

Other credits for Bloom include playing the role of Gina opposite Oscar-winning actor F. Murray Abraham in The Mentor at the Vaudeville Theatre, for the final two performances of its London run; Stepping Out (also at the Vaudeville), in which Bloom stood in for Amanda Holden and played the role of Vera; Diana Lake in French Without Tears; Becky Sharp in Vanity Fair (both at The Northcott); Gwendolen Carr in Travesties; Maggie Tulliver in The Mill on the Floss (Nottingham Playhouse); and Sally in Cleo, Camping, Emmanuelle and Dick (Harrogate Theatre); Jessie Matthews in Over My Shoulder (the story of Matthews' life at Jermyn Street Theatre); Velma Kelly in Chicago (Adelphi Theatre, West End Live, gala performances and many special events; Bombalurina in Cats (New London Theatre); Becky Sharp in Vanity Fair (Covent Garden Festival); Snookie Updergraff in 110 In the Shade (Fortune Theatre); Hot Mikado (Queen's Theatre); Smokey Joe's Cafe (Prince Of Wales); Hey, Mr. Producer! (Lyceum Theatre); and The Kid in Pal Joey (Chichester Festival Theatre).

Television and film work includes Patsy in Snuff Box with Matt Berry and Rich Fulcher (BBC3); Rachel in Genie In The House (Nickelodeon); Julie in EastEnders (BBC); Tamara in Casualty (BBC); Rik Mayall's wife in the music video for "Noble England"; Rosie in 24 Hours In London; and Daisy opposite Noel Fielding in the award-winning and BAFTA nominated short film Sweet.

On radio, she has been a guest on Ned Sherrin's Loose Ends (BBC Radio 4) and has played Tamarind in the Doctor Who spin-off series Lady Christina for Big Finish Audio Drama.

Bloom is part of the musical comedy trio Ladies Go Diva, performing at The Crazy Coqs in Piccadilly and the Café de Paris, London.

Her stand-up comedy routines can regularly be seen at many of London's comedy venues, including in Greenwich, Camden and Shoreditch.
