= Being and Nothing =

Studio album by Extreme Noise Terror
- Released: 22 May 2001
- Recorded: November 2000 at Springvale Studios in Ipswich, United Kingdom
- Genre: Deathgrind, death metal, grindcore
- Length: 29:55
- Label: Candlelight
- Producer: Mark Harwood, Zac O'Neil, Dean Jones

Extreme Noise Terror chronology
Damage 381 (1997)	Being and Nothing (2001)	Law of Retaliation (2008)

Being and Nothing is the fourth studio album by British extreme metal band Extreme Noise Terror. It was released in 2001 by Candlelight Records. It is the first and last to feature Adam Catchpole as a vocalist after Phil Vane left the band. The sound in this album leans more towards to death metal rather than their traditional crust punk roots.

== Track listing ==
- All Songs Written By Adam Catchpole, Dean Jones & Zac O'Neil, except where noted.

No.	Title	Length
1.	"Being and Nothing"	2:08
2.	"Through Mayhem"	2:21
3.	"When Gods Burn"	2:24
4.	"Man Made Hell"	4:09
5.	"Damage Limitation"	2:04
6.	"No Longer as Slaves"	2:56
7.	"One Truth One Hate"	2:19
8.	"Awakening" (Catchpole, Jones, O'Neil, Jeremy Wall)	4:03
9.	"Non Believer Genocide"	3:43
10.	"Detestation"	3:54
Total length:		29:55

== Personnel ==
Extreme Noise Terror

- Adam Catchpole - vocals
- Dean Jones - vocals
- Ali Firouzbakht - guitar
- Manny Cooke - bass
- Zac O'Neil - drums

Session musicians

- Gian Pyres - guitar

Production

- Mark Harwood - producer, engineering
- Dean Jones - producer, mixing
- Zac O'Neil - producer, mixing
