= A Holocaust in Your Head =

Studio album by Extreme Noise Terror
- Released: 1989
- Recorded: 18–20 November 1988 at Birdsong Studios in Worcester, England, United Kingdom.
- Genre: Crust punk, grindcore
- Length: 25:44
- Label: Head Eruption Records
- Producer: Steve Bird

Extreme Noise Terror chronology
| A Holocaust in Your Head (1989) | Retro-bution (1995) |

Professional ratings
Review scores
| Source | Rating |
|---|---|
| Allmusic | 4.5/5 stars |
| Sputnikmusic | 2.5/5 stars |
| This Is Not A Scene | 8/10 |

A Holocaust in Your Head is the debut album of British crust punk/grindcore band Extreme Noise Terror. The album was released in 1989 under High-Speed Recordings. After its first release, the album was reissued several times with updated versions of each track.

== Tracklist ==
| No. | Title | Length |
|---|---|---|
| 1. | "Statement" | 2:12 |
| 2. | "Deceived" | 2:09 |
| 3. | "We The Helpless" | 0:59 |
| 4. | "Bullshit Propaganda" | 2:16 |
| 5. | "Fucked Up System" | 1:07 |
| 6. | "No Threat" | 3:00 |
| 7. | "Show Us You Care" | 3:07 |
| 8. | "Use Your Mind" | 2:11 |
| 9. | "Innocence to Ignorance" | 1:33 |
| 10. | "Conned Through Life" | 1:50 |
| 11. | "Murder" | 2:19 |
| 12. | "Take the Strain" | 1:44 |
| 13. | "Another Nail in the Coffin" | 1:43 |
| 14. | "Raping the Earth" | 1:30 |
| 15. | "If You're Only in It for the Music (S.O.D. Off)" | 2:11 |
