= Get Dead or Die Trying =

Studio album by The Rotted
- Released: 8 July 2008
- Recorded: Parlour Sounds Studios
- Genres: Deathgrind, death metal, crust punk, grindcore
- Length: 38:21
- Label: Metal Blade
- Producers: Russ Russell, James Dunkley

The Rotted chronology
Get Dead or Die Trying (2008)	Ad Nauseam (2011)

Get Dead or Die Trying is the debut studio album by British death metal band The Rotted (formerly known as Gorerotted). 28 Days Later is a cover of the soundtrack song In the House - In a Heartbeat from the film of the same name, composed by John Murphy.

Michel Renaud of The Metal Crypt rated the album a 4.5 out of 5 and called it "one of the best Death Metal albums [he had] heard so far [that] year."

== Track listing ==
1. "Nothin' but a Nosebleed" – 2:54
2. "The Howling" – 2:54
3. "A Return to Insolence" – 3:41
4. "Kissing You with My Fists" – 2:56
5. "Angel of Meth" – 3:17
6. "A Brief Moment of Regret" – 2:38
7. "The Body Tree" – 3:42
8. "Get Dead or Die Trying" – 2:37
9. "It's Like There's a Party in My Mouth (and Everyone's Being Sick)" – 3:05
10. "Fear and Loathing in Old London Town" – 3:56
11. "28 Days Later" – 6:41

== Personnel ==
- Ben McCrow - Vocals
- Tim Carley - Guitar
- Gian Pyres - Guitar
- Phil Wilson - Bass
- Nate Gould - Drums
