= Ba Cissoko =

Guinean world music band

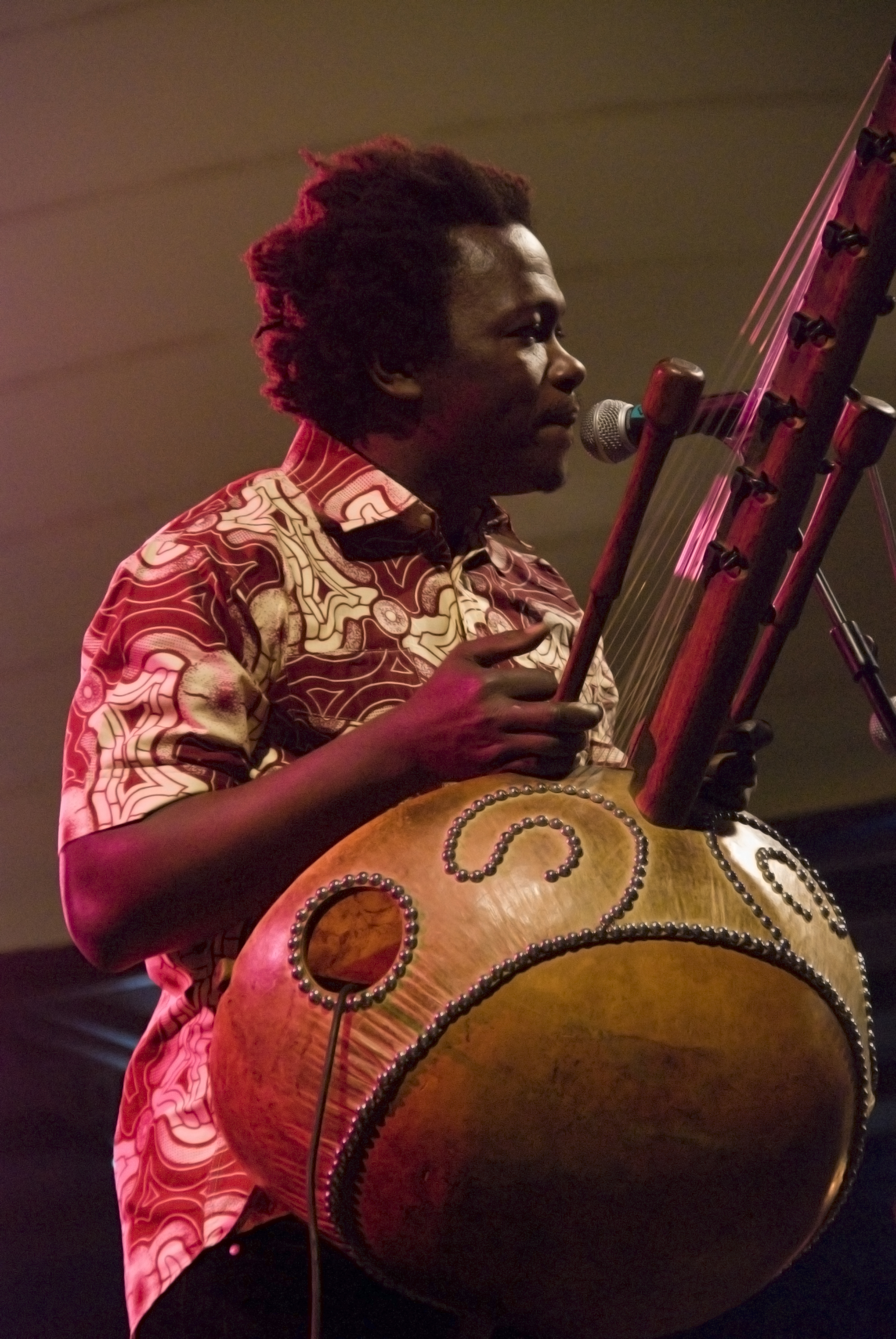
Image of Ba Cissoko

Ba Cissoko is a Guinean world music band featuring five members, two of whom play the traditional Kora harp. Two band members play percussion instruments and one plays bass. The sound of the band has been described as "West Africa meets Jimi Hendrix".

== Members ==
The band is named after the lead singer and electronic Kora player, Ba Cissoko, the nephew of the kora maestro M'Bady Kouyaté. Band members include Sekou Kouyaté also on kora, and bass player Kourou Kouyaté, both Ba Cissoko's younger cousins.

- Ba Cissoko: Lead vocal, Kora, tamani
- Sekou Kouyaté: Kora (acoustical and electrical), vocal
- Kourou Kouyaté: Bass, bolon, vocal
- Ibrahima Bah "Kounkouré": Calebasse, djembé, crin, congas
- Alhassane Camara: percussion

== History ==
Ba Cissoko was created in 1999 with just three members. The last member is featured on the album release from 2009 called Séno. The band toured the UK supporting acclaimed Nigerian musician Femi Kuti in 2007. Albums named Nimissa (2012) and Djeli (2016) followed.

Sekou Kouyaté can with his electronically enhanced Kora harp produce a sound somewhat similar to that of fast guitar tapping, partly helped by the nature of the instrument. The new sound has earned Sekou the nickname of "Jimi Hendrix Africain", due to Jimi Hendrix style riffs.
