= Ad Nauseam (The Rotted album) =

Studio album by The Rotted
- Released: 31 October 2011
- Genre: Crust punk, deathgrind, death metal
- Length: 39:31
- Label: Candlelight Records

The Rotted chronology
Get Dead or Die Trying (2008)	Ad Nauseam (2011)	Apathy In The UK (2011)

Professional ratings
Review scores
Source	Rating
Thrash Hits	5/6 stars

Ad Nauseam is the second studio album by the British death metal band The Rotted. It was released on 31 October 2011 on Candlelight Records.

== Track listing ==
No.	Title	Length
1.	"Anarchogram Sun"	3:02
2.	"Rex Oblivione"	3:04
3.	"Surrounded by Skulls"	3:29
4.	"Non Serviam"	3:51
5.	"Just Add Nauseam"	2:58
6.	"Entering the Arena of the Unwell"	2:39
7.	"The House of Bedlam"	3:51
8.	"Apathy in the UK"	2:30
9.	"Motörbastärds"	3:11
10.	"The Hammer of Witches"	5:09
11.	"Put Me Out of Your Misery"	5:47

== Personnel ==
- Ben McCrow – vocals
- Tim Carley – guitar
- Nate Gould – drums
- Reverend Trudgill – bass

== See also ==
2011 in music
