= GIT Award =

Liverpool music award

- The GIT Award logo, featuring a stylized turntable and Liverpool’s skyline.
- Awarded for: New Merseyside music
- Date: Every April or May
- Venue: Various
- Country: United Kingdom
- Presented by: Getintothis (music blog)
- Reward: £1,000 (2017)
- First award: 27 April 2012; 14 years ago
- Final award: 13 May 2017; 9 years ago
- Website: getintothis.co.uk/git-award

The GIT Award (short for Getintothis Award) was an annual English music prize recognising new and emerging music from Liverpool and the wider Merseyside region, awarded from 2012 to 2017. The award was established by the Liverpool-based music blog Getintothis in response to the revitalisation of the city's music scene following Liverpool's designation as European Capital of Culture in 2008.

The award was described as a "Scouse Mercury Prize" by Getintothis editor Peter Guy ahead of its official launch in November 2011. This comparison was widely used throughout the award's existence, including in national media outlets such as BBC, The Guardian, and NME.

The award was held annually for six editions; however, no ceremony took place in 2018 or in subsequent years. While no official termination has been announced, Getintothis editor Peter Guy attributed the award's absence to declining arts funding, financial struggles for independent venues and festivals, and broader challenges within Liverpool's creative sector.

== Winners and shortlisted nominees ==
	Date	Winner	Shortlisted Nominees	Inspiration Award	One To Watch	Host(s)	Venue
1st	27 April 2012	Loved Ones	Bang On, Bill Ryder-Jones, Esco Williams, Ex-Easter Island Head, Forest Swords, Miss Stylie, Mugstar, Ninetails, Outfit, Stealing Sheep, The Tea Street Band	The Kazimier	N/A	John Robb	Leaf
2nd	24 April 2013	Baltic Fleet	Barberos, By The Sea, Nadine Carina, Clinic, Conan, Dan Croll, John Heckle, Jetta, Tyler Mensah, (Note: Then 15-year-old Tyler Mensah, currently known as Sub Blue (short for Suburban Blue), was awarded The People’s Choice Award, determined by votes from listeners and readers of Bido Lito!, Getintothis, Seven Streets, and Juice FM.) Stealing Sheep, Wave Machines	The Justice Collective	N/A	Neil Atkinson	Leaf
3rd	11 April 2014	Forest Swords	All We Are, Bill Ryder-Jones, Circa Waves, Dan Croll, Evian Christ, Ex-Easter Island Head, Mad Brains, Ninetails, Outfit, The Tea Street Band, VEYU	Africa Oyé	Låpsley	Howard Be Thy Name	The Kazimier
4th	4 April 2015	All We Are	Circa Waves, D R O H N E, Esa Shields, Gulf, Hooton Tennis Club, Jane Weaver, Låpsley, Roxanne Jones, Sundowners, Xam Volo, We Are Catchers	Alan Wills† (posthumous award)	Louis Berry	Impropriety (Liverpool improv act)	The Kazimier
5th	14 May 2016	Bill Ryder-Jones	Clean Cut Kid, Dragged into Sunlight, Hooton Tennis Club, L U M E N, MiC LOWRY, Mugstar, RongoRongo, Stealing Sheep, Trudy, TVAM, The Vryll Society	Liverpool Vision‘s Kevin McManus	Tayá	Roger Hill	Constellations
6th	13 May 2017	She Drew The Gun	Aystar, Baltic Fleet, Louis Berry, The Coral, God Colony, Immix Ensemble, Ohmns, Or:la, Suedebrown, XamVolo, The Vryll Society	24 Kitchen Street	Zuzu	Roger Hill	Constellations

== See also ==
- Music of Liverpool
- List of bands and artists from Merseyside
- Culture of Liverpool
