= Extreme Noise Terror (album) =

Studio album by Extreme Noise Terror
- Released: 6 November 2015
- Recorded: 2014–2015
- Studio: Springvale Studios, Ipswich
- Length: 26:06
- Label: Willowtip
- Producer: Mark Harwood

Extreme Noise Terror chronology
Law of Retaliation (2008)	Extreme Noise Terror (2015)

Extreme Noise Terror is the sixth studio album by English grindcore band Extreme Noise Terror. It was released on 6 November 2015, by Willowtip Records. The album marks the return of their crust punk roots with highly aggressive raw sound and the first album to feature Desecration bassist Andi Morris and The Rotted former vocalist Ben McCrow.

== Track listing ==
All lyrics are written by Dean Jones, Phil Vane, Ben McCrow; all music is composed by Dean Jones, Ollie Jones and Andi Morris, except where noted

No.	Title	Music	Length
1.	"Punk Rock Patrol"		2:13
2.	"Dogma, Intolerance, Control"		1:26
3.	"No One Is Innocent"		3:33
4.	"I Like Coca (Outo "I Like Cola")"	Outo	2:06
5.	"Think Outside the Box"	Barney Monger, Chris Casket (listed as 'Chino Mitchell'), Dean Jones, Phil Vane	1:27
6.	"Chained & Crazed"		1:48
7.	"An Endless Cycle of Misery"		1:58
8.	"Sheep in Wolf's Clothing"		1:47
9.	"Cash and Trash"		1:36
10.	"Cruel and Unusual Punishment"		2:13
11.	"Last Fix of Fame"		1:51
12.	"Cage Paralysis"	Barney Monger, Chris Casket (listed as 'Chino Mitchell'), Dean Jones, Phil Vane	2:04
13.	"Only in It for the Music pt. 27 (Black Putrefaction)"		2:04
Total length:			26:06

== Personnel ==
Extreme Noise Terror

- Dean Jones – vocals
- Ben McCrow – vocals
- Paul Woodfield – lead guitar
- Ollie Jones – rhythm guitar
- Andi Morris – bass
- Barney Monger – drums

Session musician

- Kody Minus – lead guitar

Production

- Dean Jones – engineering, mixing, artwork
- Mark Harwood – engineering, mixing, production
- Martina Seric – artwork
- Maja Jones – artwork
