= A New Dawn for the Dead =

Studio album by Gorerotted
- Released: 28 June 2005
- Recorded: February 2005
- Genre: Deathgrind
- Length: 33:58
- Label: Metal Blade
- Producer: Stephan Fimmers

Gorerotted chronology
Only Tools and Corpses (2003)	A New Dawn for the Dead (2005)	Get Dead or Die Trying (2008)

Professional ratings
Review scores
Source	Rating
AllMusic	3.5/5 stars

A New Dawn for the Dead is the third studio album by the British death metal band Gorerotted, released in 2005 by Metal Blade Records.

== Track listing ==
1. "...And Everything Went Black" – 4:12
2. "Pain as a Prelude to Death" – 3:09
3. "Nervous Gibbering Wreck" – 3:08
4. "Adding Insult to Injury" – 3:30
5. "Fable of Filth" – 2:49
6. "Dead Drunk" – 2:58
7. "A Very Grave Business" – 3:42
8. "Horrorday in Haiti" – 2:19
9. "Selection and Dissection of Parts for Resurrection" – 4:49

== Personnel ==
- Ben'Rotted – vocals
- Phil Wilson – bass, vocals
- Tim'Rotted – guitar
- Matt Hoban – guitar
- "Junky" Jon Rushforth – drums
