= Healthy Junkies =

British band

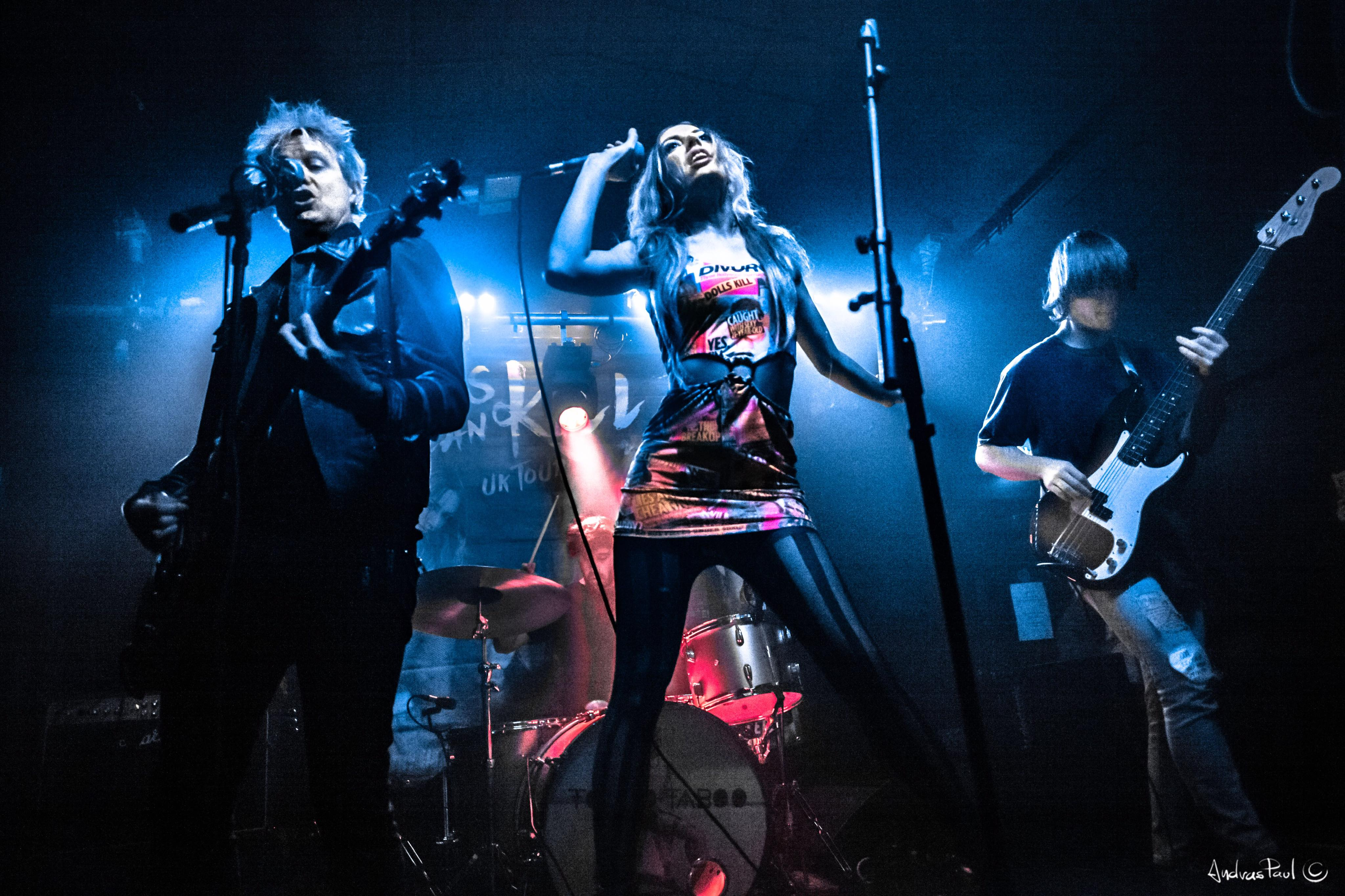
- Healthy Junkies

Background information
- Origin: London, Paris
- Genre: Punk rock
- Label: Banana Castle Records / Cargo Records
- Members: Nina Courson, Phil Honey-Jones, Joe Gaskell, David James
- Past members: Tjay Tarantino, Steve Nightmare, Dave Renegade, Steve Grainger, Tony Alda, Pumpy, Dany Fury, Dave Whitmore.
- Website: www.healthyjunkies.co.uk

Healthy Junkies are a punk rock / grunge band based in London, UK. The current line-up consists of French-born singer Nina Courson (vocals), Phil Honey-Jones (guitar/vocals), Joe Gaskell (bass) and David James (drums). The band have achieved press coverage in the music magazines Vive Le Rock and Black Velvet, as well as website Louder Than War.

== History ==
Courson met guitarist Honey-Jones at a Soho nightclub called PUNK in 2009, after relocating from Paris to pursue her musical career. They named their band as "a reflection of the mental health epidemic currently spreading like wildfire through the very core of western society",

The group played their live debut in Brighton at the end of 2010, supporting Goldblade and Viv Albertine. They have since released four studio albums and toured extensively across Europe, the United Kingdom and United States, gaining a loyal following for their performances.

The band have supported The Rezillos, Sham 69, UK Subs, The Professionals, GBH, Vice Squad, The Buzzcocks and Theatre of Hate, and regularly play at festivals such as Rebellion and Camden Rocks. Courson and Honey-Jones also promote the 'Punk and Roll Rendezvous' club night in Camden, which has become internationally renowned and spawned a yearly festival.

== Musical style ==
Lauded for their "blistering, trashy, punky glam rock sound", the band has been described as "a homage to psychedelic rock/punk rock and grunge of days gone by but ...with a fresh, modern twist." Black Velvet Magazine praised their "addictive songs with bounce and energy" and Artrocker wrote "the band excel at peripherally gothic action rock." Nina's "sultry melodic" vocals have drawn favourable comparisons to Chrissie Hynde, Siouxsie Sioux and Patti Smith whilst Louder Than War commented that Honey-Jones' guitars "provide an energetic binding agent that helps meld together goth, glam, grunge, punk and psychedelic sensibilities." Vive Le Rock described Delirious Dream as "gorgeous yet nightmarish", and Devolution magazine noted that "To be able to take a sound that is recognisable from the 60s ...and DeLorean it into something fit to please and thrill people well into the 2020s and beyond is astonishing in itself. To do so with such panache and flamboyance is truly amazing."

== Discography ==
Albums

- Sick Note (2011 Banana Castle Records)
- The Lost Refuge (2014 STP Records)
- Box of Chaos (2016 STP Records)
- Delirious Dream (2018 Banana Castle Records)
- Forever on the Road (2020 Banana Castle Records)
- Listen to the Mad (2024 Banana Castle Records)

EPs

- Hair of the Dog (2015 Banana Castle Records)
- The Absynth Sessions (2017 Banana Castle Records)
- No Control (2018 Banana Castle Records / Cargo Records)
- Lion in a circus (2022 Banana Castle Records)

Collaborations

- Vive Le Rock! - with Neon Animal (Gods Own Bastards EP, 2019)
- Kill The Hate – with MK Ultra (2019)
