= Gorerotted =

English deathgrind band

- Origin: London, England
- Genres: Grindcore, death metal
- Years active: 1997–2014, 2026-Present
- Website: gorerotted.com

Gorerotted are an English deathgrind band that formed in 1997, disbanded in January 2008, and reformed with new members as The Rotted until 2014, before announcing a reunion under their original name in 2026. Horror films, VHS Video Nasty films, and serial killers inspired Gorerotted's lyrics and song titles. The band's song titles often incorporate humorous rhymes or puns such as "Cut, Gut, Beaten, Eaten", "Put Your Bits in a Concrete Mix", and "Only Tools and Corpses", a pun on British sitcom Only Fools and Horses, the latter beginning with a similar introductory drumbeat to the sitcom's theme music. The song "Carrion Smelling" is a pun on the British Carry On (franchise) films.

Gorerotted employ a dual vocal style. Originally, Goreskin delivered a deep, death growl-style and Mr. Gore provided contrast with high-pitched punk-style yelling and screaming. When bassist Wilson joined on the album Only Tools and Corpses, he added high-pitched growls and screams. Thus, the band had three voices going at times. After Mr. Gore's departure in 2004, Wilson took over his vocal parts in the older songs, and Reverend Trudgill covering the higher vocals. The guitar riffs are often fast and technical, and the bass usually doubles these parts. Both the guitars and the bass are tuned down one whole-step (guitars are tuned to D), to achieve a heavier sound. The drumming is fast, often using blast beats and double bass.

The band released its debut studio album, Mutilated In Minutes, in 2000 through the guitarist Fluffy's label, Dead Again Records, before reissuing the work in 2002 via Relapse Records. This release was preceded by a 1998 demo titled Her Gash Did I Slash in 1998. Gorerotted signed with Metal Blade Records in 2003 and released the album Only Tools And Corpses the same year, followed by their third and final album, New Dawn For The Dead, in 2005.

During their early period, the band undertook extensive tours across the UK and Europe alongside acts such as Nile, Decapitated, Cryptopsy, Vomitory and Pungent Stench, traveled to the US to play at Maryland Deathfest in 2007, and appeared in an advert for The Sun newspaper. Additionally, they appeared on the soundtrack to two films, The Incredibly Strange People Show and Porn of the Dead, a zombie-themed hardcore pornography release.

Goreskin and founding member and guitarist Fluffy renamed the band The Rotted in 2008, when their new material adopted a more death metal/punk style. They continued to tour and record until disbanding in 2014.

On the 12th of January 2026, Gorerotted announced they would return to play Damnation Festival. Following the death of former bassist Wilson, the band recruited Reverend Trudgill—a former bandmate from The Rotted and former frontman of Screamin' Dæmon—to complete the lineup with Goreskin, Fluffy, and Junky Jon, who were the only members to appear on all three albums.

== Discography ==
Gorerotted

- Her Gash I Did Slash (Demo, 1998)
- Mutilated in Minutes (Relapse Records/Dead Again/IBD, 2000)
- Split Your Guts Vol. 1 (Deepsend Records, 2002)
- Only Tools and Corpses (Metal Blade Records, 2003)
- A New Dawn for the Dead (Metal Blade Records, 2005)

The Rotted

- Get Dead or Die Trying (Metal Blade Records, 2008)
- Ad Nauseam (Candlelight Records, 2011)

== Members ==
Current line-up

- Fluffy – guitar (1997–2014, 2026-present)
- Goreskin – vocals (1999–2014, 2026-present)
- Junky Jon – drums (1999–2008, 2026-present)
- Reverend Trudgill – bass (2008-2014, 2026-present)

Former members

- Jeremy "Milky" Gray – guitar (1997–1999)
- Jason "Mr Gore" Merle – vocals (1997–2003)
- Dave "Infester" Hirschheimer – drums (1998)
- Steve "Mr. Smith" Smith – bass (1998–2001)
- David "Dicksplash" Hewitt – guitar (1999–2001)
- Matt "Robin Pants" Hoban – guitar (2001–2007)
- Nate Gould – drums (2008-2014)
- Phil Wilson – bass, vocals (2001–2008)
- Gianpiero Piras – guitar (2007–2009)

Touring musicians

- Dan Ford – drums (1997)
- Lakis Kyriacou – guitar (1997)
- Dan Knight – guitar (2006)
