= Blow Up (club night) =

Coordinates: 51.5384°N 0.1409°W

- Industry: Nightclub
- Founded: 16 October 1993; 33 years ago London, England, U.K.
- Key people: Paul Tunkin (Founder/DJ)
- Website: www.blowupclub.com

Blow Up is a club night that was founded in the early 1990s by promoter and DJ Paul Tunkin at a North London pub called "The Laurel Tree". The night quickly became the centre of the emerging Britpop scene in Camden attracting long queues of people eager to gain entry to the tiny venue. Early regulars included members of Blur, Pulp, Elastica, Suede, The Buzzcocks, Huggy Bear and The Jesus and Mary Chain, leading to the club being referred to as the place where "Britpop was born".

The style of Blow Up and its audience has been noted as an early influence on, and instrumental in, the later mid-Nineties explosion of the Britpop scene in the UK and abroad, with Time Out calling it the "breeding ground" of the Britpop sound. John Best said that "not only do British bands look like Jarvis now, so do fashion models. It's global and I think it started at Blow Up." The Guest List called it "the night that spawned a thousand bands".

== History ==
Often mistakenly labelled as purely a 'mod club' by the press, Blow Up had a much wider musical scope than this, although the club was initially started by Tunkin as a reaction to the prevalent grunge/slacker scene which he said "was so anti-style". The music played included British Pop and R'n'B from the 1960s (Small Faces, Kinks, Rolling Stones etc.) and Soul, late 1970s new wave (Buzzcocks, Wire etc.) together with emerging new bands mixed in with film soundtracks, 'music library' tracks, Easy Listening and 1960s electronic music (Jean Jacques Perry et al.); anything that fell under Tunkin's term of 'Orgasmic Pop'.

=== 1993–1996: The Laurel Tree ===
When the club first opened in October 1993 its audience was attracted by word of mouth, predominantly made up of Camden locals, as well as a large proportion of people from Tunkin's hometown of Southend. However almost a year after opening in 1994, an early defining point for Blow Up was the publication of a 4-page article in music magazine Select devoted entirely to the club, which attracted people from much further afield fuelling its popularity even further. Blow Up's format and the sharp style of its 'regulars' was in contrast to the ubiquitous indie/rock clubs of the time, and it went on to influence many similar nights; it was referred to by Melody Maker at the height of Britpop in 1995 as "The Club That Changed The World". A year later Blow Up was featured in Vox magazine as one of "5 clubs that changed the face of clubbing", alongside seminal UK punk clubs The Blitz and The Roxy.

=== 1996–2001: The Wag Club ===
Promotional flyer

The club relocated to Soho into the much larger venue of The Wag Club in 1996, and did much to revive the latter's fortunes which had somewhat waned since its 1980s heyday. Although Blow Up had played host to the occasional live band in Camden, the larger capacity of the Wag enabled live shows to be hosted on a weekly basis, which continued to reflect the clubs broad musical outlook. Bands that played ranged from stalwarts of the 1960s music scene such as Desmond Dekker, to avant-garde acts such as Chicks On Speed and Stereo Total, and also included a very early show for The Libertines in 1999. In 1999 the club was voted No. 4 in Time Out Magazine's 'Top Ten clubs of the 90s'. When The Wag finally closed in 2001 after 40 years, the last club to be held there was Blow Up.

=== 2001–2009: The Metro Club ===
During the last of several short residencies at other Soho venues in 2001 after The Wag's closure, Blow Up took over the running of a venue on London's Oxford Street called The Metro Club; shortly afterward the Blow Up club night was moved there. Prior to this The Metro club was known primarily as a club venue, but Blow Up began promoting live shows here too, and in 2002 the venue earned Time Out Magazine's 'Live Venue of The Year' award, attributed to the breakthrough acts booked in their first year there; early shows including bands such as Yeah Yeah Yeahs, Kings of Leon and The Killers. Due to the planned extension of Tottenham Court Road Underground station, the Metro Club was issued a Compulsory Purchase Order by Transport for London with 28 days notice in December 2008, and was forced to close. It held its last Blow Up night on 17 January 2009, also the last night of the venue itself.

=== 2009–present: Post The Metro Club ===
Blow Up moved to Bar Rumba, Soho on 24 January 2009, after which it moved to 4 Denmark Street in 2011, followed by several other London residencies and one-off events. It is currently in residence at The Bussey Building (a warehouse/Arts space in Peckham), where it held its 20th Anniversary Party in February 2014. Since 2009 the club has hosted more events in the United States (New York City, Los Angeles, San Francisco and Sacramento) and also returned to Tokyo.

== Resident Djs ==
- Paul Tunkin (1993–present)
- Ian Jackson (1994–present)
- Andy Lewis (1993–2002)
- The Karminsky Experience (1994–1995, 1996–2001)
- Nori (aka Mansfield) (1995–1997)

== Tours ==
The Blow Up club has also appeared on or as part of the following tours and events (incomplete):

- Blur, Park Life Tour, All UK dates, 1994.
- Blur at Mile End Stadium, London, UK, 1995.
- Pulp Different Class Tour, Aftershow at Wembley Arena, London, UK, 1995.
- NME Brat Awards, London, UK, 1995-1999.
- The Camden Crawl, London, UK, 1996–1997.
- Quadrophenia, Film Reissue Launch, Brighton, UK, 29 January 1997.
- MTV Europe Music Awards, Milan, Italy, 1998.
- V&A Sixties Fashion, Sixties Graphics & Che Guevara Exhibitions Launch Night, Victoria & Albert Museum, London, UK, 5 June 2006.
- Latitude Festival, Suffolk, UK, 2011.

The club has also held nights around the UK, as well in Europe, Japan, Russia and the United States.

== See also ==
There is also an affiliated record label Blow Up Records.
