= Tory Lanez discography =

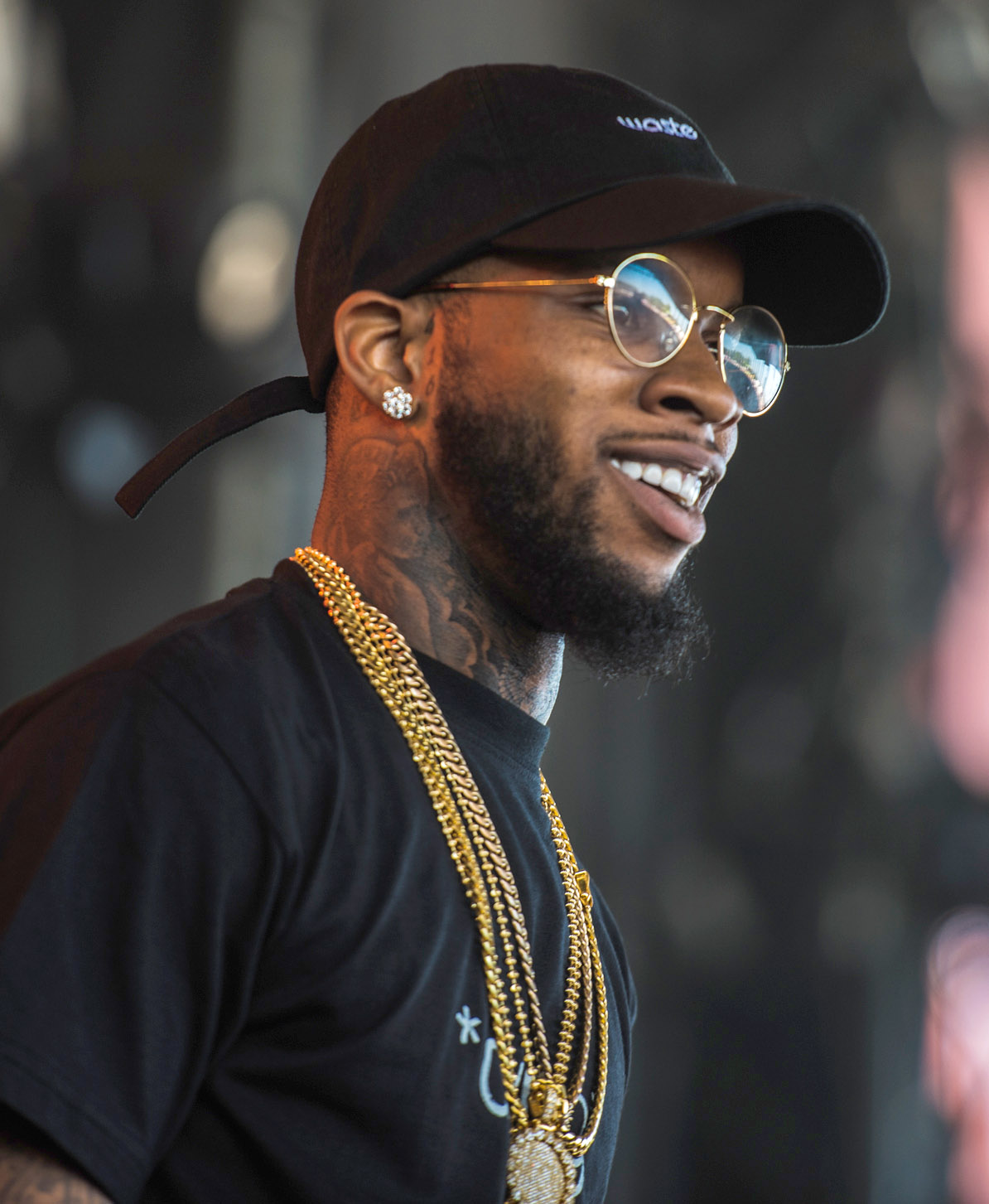
- Tory Lanez in July 2016
- Studio albums: 10
- EPs: 4
- Singles: 89
- Music videos: 90
- Mixtapes: 20

Canadian singer and rapper Tory Lanez has released ten studio albums, twenty mixtapes, four extended plays (EP), eighty-nine singles (including forty-nine as a featured artist) and more than eighty music videos. In 2009, Lanez began his career by releasing his debut mixtape, T.L 2 T.O. He received major recognition from the mixtape, Conflicts of My Soul: The 416 Story, released in August 2013, which included guest appearances from Roscoe Dash and Kirko Bangz. In 2014, he released Lost Cause, which led to his first tour, the Lost Cause tour. Lanez collaborated with the WeDidIt collective on the Cruel Intentions EP in 2015. Chixtape III and The New Toronto were released later that year. He released his debut album I Told You, in 2016.

== Albums ==
=== Studio albums ===
List of studio albums, with year released
| Title | Album details | Peak chart positions | | | | | | | | | | Certifications |
| Title | Album details | CAN | AUS | FRA | NLD | IRE | NZ | UK | US | US R&B/HH | US Rap | Certifications |
|---|---|---|---|---|---|---|---|---|---|---|---|---|
| I Told You | Released: August 19, 2016; Label: Mad Love, Interscope; Format: CD, LP, digital download | 5 | 34 | 92 | 23 | — | — (Note: I Told You did not enter the NZ Top 40 Albums Chart, but peaked at number four on the NZ Heatseeker Albums Chart.) | 18 | 4 | 2 | 1 | RIAA: Gold; RMNZ: Gold |
| Memories Don't Die | Released: March 2, 2018; Label: Mad Love, Interscope; Format: CD, LP, digital download | 1 | — | 50 | 7 | 31 | 31 | 8 | 3 | 2 | 2 | |
| Love Me Now? | Released: October 26, 2018; Label: Mad Love, Interscope; Format: CD, digital download | 4 | — (Note: Love Me Now? did not enter the ARIA Albums Chart, but peaked at number 41 on the ARIA Digital Albums Chart.) | — | 21 | 60 | 37 | 18 | 4 | 2 | 1 | BPI: Silver |
| Chixtape 5 | Released: November 15, 2019; Label: Mad Love, Interscope; Format: CD, LP, digital download | 2 | 18 | 76 | 15 | 81 | 25 | 10 | 2 | 1 | 1 | RIAA: Gold; BPI: Silver; RMNZ: Gold |
| Daystar | Released: September 25, 2020; Label: One Umbrella; Format: Digital download, streaming | 6 | — | — | 48 | — | — | — | 10 | 4 | 4 | |
| Alone at Prom | Released: December 10, 2021; Label: One Umbrella; Formats: CD, LP, digital download, streaming | 19 | — | — | 92 | 99 | 38 | 57 | 28 | 25 | — | RIAA: Gold; BPI: Gold; RMNZ: Platinum |
| Sorry 4 What | Released: September 30, 2022; Label: One Umbrella; Formats: Digital download, streaming | 5 | — | — | 54 | — | — | 49 | 10 | 4 | 2 | |
| Peterson | Released: March 7, 2025; Label: One Umbrella; Formats: CD, LP, digital download, streaming | 38 | — | — | — | — | — | — | 25 | 11 | 8 | |
| LOL: Slutty Bass | Released: April 3, 2026; Label: One Umbrella; Formats: digital download, streaming | — | — | — | — | — | — | — | — | — | — | |
| Made You Think I Was Gone ...But | Released: July 17, 2026; Label: One Umbrella; Formats: digital download, streaming | 23 | — | — | — | — | — | — | 33 | 11 | 7 | |
"—" denotes a recording that did not chart or was not released in that territory.

=== Commercial mixtapes ===
List of commercial mixtapes, with selected chart positions
| Title | Album details | Peak chart positions | | | | | | | | | |
| Title | Album details | CAN | AUS | FRA | NLD | IRE | NZ | UK | US | US R&B/HH | US Rap |
|---|---|---|---|---|---|---|---|---|---|---|---|
| The New Toronto 3 | Released: April 10, 2020; Label: Mad Love, Interscope; Format: Streaming, digital download | 1 | 10 | 40 | 16 | 31 | 23 | 4 | 2 | 2 | 1 |
| Loner | Released: December 22, 2020; Label: One Umbrella; Format: Digital download, streaming | — | — | — | — | — | — | — | — | — | — |
| Playboy | Released: March 5, 2021; Released: May 7, 2021 (Live Version); Label: One Umbrella; Format: digital download, streaming | 56 | — | — | — | — | — | — | 76 | 43 | — |
"—" denotes a recording that did not chart or was not released in that territory.

=== Mixtapes ===
List of mixtapes and selected details
| Title | Mixtape details |
|---|---|
| T.L 2 T.O | Released: March 31, 2009; Label: Self-released; Format: Digital download |
| Just Landed | Released: July 27, 2010; Label: Self-released; Format: Digital download |
| One Verse One Hearse | Released: October 2010; Label: Self-released; Format: Digital download |
| Mr. 1 Verse Killah | Released: December 2, 2010; Label: Self-released; Format: Digital download |
| Mr. Peterson | Released: January 1, 2011; Label: Time Is Money; Format: Digital download |
| Chixtape | Released: February 24, 2011; Label: Time Is Money; Format: CD, digital download |
| Swavey | Released: June 10, 2011; Label: Self-released; Format: Digital download |
| Ignant Shit | Released: March 19, 2012; Label: Self-released; Format: Digital download |
| Sincerely Tory | Released: May 15, 2012; Label: Self-released; Format: Digital download |
| Conflicts of My Soul: The 416 Story | Released: August 26, 2013; Label: Self-released; Format: Digital download |
| Chixtape II | Released: March 6, 2014; Label: Self-released; Format: Digital download, streaming |
| Lost Cause | Released: October 1, 2014 (Note: Re-released on streaming on October 4, 2024, through One Umbrella.); Label: Self-released; Format: Digital download, streaming |
| Chixtape III | Released: December 25, 2015; Label: Self-released; Format: Digital download, streaming |
| The New Toronto | Released: December 25, 2015; Label: Gangsta Grillz; Format: Digital download, streaming |
| Chixtape IV | Released: January 1, 2017; Label: Mad Love; Format: Digital download, streaming |
| The New Toronto 2 | Released: January 1, 2017; Label: Mad Love; Format: Digital download, streaming |

== EPs ==
List of extended plays and selected details
| Title | Extended play details |
|---|---|
| Cruel Intentions | Released: June 26, 2015; Label: WeDidIt; Format: Digital download |
| The Bag | Released: February 9, 2018; Label: Self-Released; Format: Digital download |
| International Fargo | Released: April 3, 2019; Label: Self-Released; Format: Digital download |
| VVS Capsule | Released: July 10, 2020; Label: One Umbrella; Format: Digital download, streaming |
| We Outside | Released: July 27, 2021; Label: One Umbrella; Format: Digital download, streaming |
| When It's Dark | Released: August 10, 2021; Label: One Umbrella; Formats: NFT |

== Singles ==
=== As lead artist ===
List of singles as lead artist, with selected chart positions, showing year released and album name
| Title | Year | Peak chart positions | | | | | | | | | | Certifications | Album |
| Title | Year | CAN | AUS | FRA | NLD | IRE | NZ Hot | UK | US | US R&B/HH | US R&B | Certifications | Album |
|---|---|---|---|---|---|---|---|---|---|---|---|---|---|
| "Say It" | 2015 | 62 | — | — | — | — | — | — | 23 | 10 | 5 | BPI: Gold; RIAA: 3× Platinum | I Told You |
| "B.L.O.W." | 2015 | — | — | — | — | — | — | — | — | — | — | | Non-album singles |
| "LA Confidential" | 2016 | — | — | — | — | — | — | — | — (Note: "LA Confidential" did not enter the Billboard Hot 100, but peaked at number 24 on the Bubbling Under Hot 100 chart.) | 43 | 15 | RIAA: Gold | Non-album singles |
| "Luv" | 2016 | 28 | 83 | 119 | 52 | 69 | 10 | 47 | 19 | 4 | 2 | MC: Platinum; BPI: Gold; RIAA: 2× Platinum | I Told You |
| "Shooters" | 2017 | 68 | — | — | — | — | — | — | — (Note: "Shooters" did not enter the Billboard Hot 100, but peaked at number 19 on the Bubbling Under Hot 100 chart.) | — | 13 | MC: Gold; RIAA: Gold | Memories Don't Die |
| "Skrt Skrt" | 2017 | 96 | — | — | — | — | — | — | — | — | 20 | | Memories Don't Die |
| "Real Thing" (featuring Future) | 2017 | 71 | — | — | — | — | — | — | — | — | — | | Memories Don't Die |
| "I Sip" | 2017 | 79 | — | — | — | — | — | — | — | — | 16 | | Non-album singles |
| "Miss You" (with Cashmere Cat and Major Lazer) | 2018 | 66 | 65 | — | 86 | — | — | — | — | — | — | | Non-album singles |
| "Pa Mí" (with Ozuna) | 2018 | — | — | — | — | — | — | — | — | — | — | RIAA: Gold (Latin) | Non-album singles |
| "Talk to Me" (with Rich the Kid) | 2018 | 55 | — | — | — | — | 35 | — | 43 | 18 | 4 | BPI: Silver; RIAA: 2× Platinum | Love Me Now? |
| "Keep in Touch" (with Bryson Tiller) | 2018 | — | — | — | — | — | — | — | — | — | — | | Love Me Now? |
| "Ferris Wheel" (featuring Trippie Redd) | 2019 | — | — | — | — | — | — | — | — (Note: "Ferris Wheel" did not enter the Billboard Hot 100, but peaked at number five on the Bubbling Under Hot 100 chart.) | 49 | — | RIAA: Gold | Love Me Now? |
| "Freaky" | 2019 | 41 | — | — | — | — | 11 | 94 | — (Note: "Freaky" did not enter the Billboard Hot 100, but peaked at number 11 on the Bubbling Under Hot 100 chart.) | — | — | | Love Me Now? Reloaded |
| "Tic Toc" (with Rich the Kid) | 2019 | — | — | — | — | — | — | — | — | — | — | | The World Is Yours 2 |
| "Broke Leg" (with Quavo and Tyga) | 2019 | 70 | — | — | — | — | — | — | — | — | — | | Love Me Now? Reloaded |
| "Not Today" (with Dappy) | 2019 | — | — | — | — | — | — | 43 | — | — | — | | Non-album singles |
| "Melee" | 2019 | — | — | — | — | — | — | — | — | — | — | | Non-album singles |
| "Forever" | 2019 | 74 | — | — | — | — | 13 | — | — (Note: "Forever" did not enter the Billboard Hot 100, but peaked at number 21 on the Bubbling Under Hot 100 chart.) | — | — | | Non-album singles |
| "Feel It Too" (with Tainy and Jessie Reyez) | 2019 | 89 | — | — | — | — | — | — | — | — | — | | Non-album singles |
| "2 Cups" (with Stay Flee Get Lizzy, Popcaan, and Fredo) | 2019 | — | — | — | — | — | — | — | — | — | — | BPI: Silver | Non-album singles |
| "Jerry Sprunger" (with T-Pain) | 2019 | 34 | 95 | — | — | 98 | 8 | 32 | 44 | 20 | — | BPI: Silver; RIAA: Platinum | Chixtape 5 |
| "Numb" (with Brianna Cash) | 2020 | — | — | — | — | — | — | — | — | — | — | | Non-album singles |
| "K Lo K" (featuring Fivio Foreign) | 2020 | 86 | — | — | — | — | — | — | — | — | — | | Non-album singles |
| "Broke in a Minute" | 2020 | 76 | — | — | — | — | 22 | — | 64 | 28 | — | RIAA: Platinum | The New Toronto 3 |
| "Do the Most" | 2020 | 83 | — | — | — | — | 28 | — | — (Note: "Do the Most" did not enter the Billboard Hot 100, but peaked at number six on the Bubbling Under Hot 100 chart.) | — | — | | The New Toronto 3 |
| "Who Needs Love" | 2020 | 57 | — | — | — | — | 17 | 58 | — (Note: "Who Needs Love" did not enter the Billboard Hot 100, but peaked at number one on the Bubbling Under Hot 100 chart.) | 48 | — | | The New Toronto 3 |
| "Temperature Rising" | 2020 | — | — | — | — | — | — | — | — | — | 14 | | Non-album single |
| "Convertible Burt" (with Kevin Gates) | 2020 | — | — | — | — | — | — | — | — | — | — | | Road to Fast 9 |
| "392" (with VV$ Ken) | 2020 | — | — | — | — | — | — | — | — | — | — | | VVS Capsule |
| "Staccato" | 2020 | — | — | — | — | — | — | — | — | — | — | MC: Gold | VVS Capsule |
| "Rotation" (with Legaxy) | 2020 | — | — | — | — | — | — | — | — | — | — | | Non-album singles |
| "Say My Name" (with Isaiah J. Medina) | 2020 | — | — | — | — | — | — | — | — | — | — | | Non-album singles |
| "Big Tipper" (featuring Melii and Lil Wayne) | 2020 | — | — | — | — | — | — | — | — | — | — | | Loner |
| "1 Hitter" (featuring VV$ Ken) | 2021 | — | — | — | — | — | — | — | — | — | — | | Loner |
| "Feels" (featuring Chris Brown) | 2021 | — | — | — | — | — | — | — | — | — | 20 | | Playboy |
| "Skat" (featuring DaBaby) | 2021 | 83 | — | — | — | — | 24 | — | — (Note: "Skat" did not enter the Billboard Hot 100, but peaked at number five on the Bubbling Under Hot 100 chart.) | 47 | — | | Non-album single |
| "When It's Dark" | 2021 | — | — | — | — | — | — | — | — | — | — | | When It's Dark |
| "Lady of Namek" | 2021 | — | — | — | — | — | — | — | — | — | 23 | BPI: Silver; RIAA: Platinum | Alone at Prom |
| "'87 Stingray" | 2021 | — | — | — | — | — | — | — | — | — | — | | Alone at Prom |
| "Racks to the Ceiling" (with Lil Pump) | 2021 | — | — | — | — | — | — | — | — | — | — | | No Name |
| "Enchanted Waterfall" | 2021 | — | — | — | — | — | — | — | — | — | 15 | | Alone at Prom |
| "Chauffeur" (with Diljit Dosanjh) | 2022 | 32 | — | — | — | — | — | — | — | — | — | MC: Gold | Non-album singles |
| "I Like" | 2022 | — | — | — | — | — | — | — | — | — | 22 | RIAA: Gold | Non-album singles |
| "No Switches" (with Lil Gnar) | 2022 | — | — | — | — | — | — | — | — | — | — | | Die Bout It |
| "It Doesnt Matter" | 2022 | — | — | — | — | — | — | — | — | — | — | | Fargo Fridays (Season 3) |
| "Why Did I" | 2022 | — | — | — | — | — | — | — | — | — | — | | Sorry 4 What |
| "Hurts Me" (with Trippie Redd and Yoko Gold) | 2023 | 85 | — | — | — | 66 | 9 | 90 | — (Note: "Hurts Me" did not enter the Billboard Hot 100, but peaked at number five on the Bubbling Under Hot 100 chart.) | — | — | BPI: Silver; RIAA: Gold | Alone at Prom (Deluxe) |
| "I've Been (Lost Tapes 2016)" | 2024 | — | — | — | — | — | 28 | — | — | — | — | | Non-album singles |
| "Girls Around the World (Lost Tapes 2016)" | 2024 | — | — | — | — | — | 25 | — | — | — | — | | Non-album singles |
| "Someone Else (Lost Tapes 2015)" | 2024 | — | — | — | — | — | 29 | — | — | — | — | | Non-album singles |
| "Wish I Never Met You (Prison Tapes)" | 2024 | 85 | — | — | — | — | 10 | — | — (Note: "Wish I Never Met You (Prison Tapes)" did not enter the Billboard Hot 100, but peaked at number 16 on the Bubbling Under Hot 100 chart.) | 33 | 7 | | Non-album singles |
| "Know What You Need (Prison Tapes)" | 2024 | — | — | — | — | — | 34 | — | — | — | — | | Non-album singles |
| "S.L.I.D.E" | 2026 | — | — | — | — | — | 26 | — | — | — | — | | LOL: Slutty Bass |
"—" denotes a recording that did not chart or was not released in that territory.

=== As featured artist ===
List of singles as a featured artist, with selected chart positions, showing year released and album name
| Title | Year | Peak chart positions | | | | | | | | | | Certifications | Album |
| Title | Year | CAN | AUS | FRA | NLD | IRE | NZ | UK | US | US R&B/HH | US R&B | Certifications | Album |
|---|---|---|---|---|---|---|---|---|---|---|---|---|---|
| "All Away" (Elhae featuring Rick Ross and Tory Lanez) | 2013 | — | — | — | — | — | — | — | — | — | — | | Champagne Wishes |
| "My City (Remix)" (Knocka featuring Tory Lanez) | 2014 | — | — | — | — | — | — | — | — | — | — | | Non-album singles |
| "Anyway" (DJ Carisma featuring Tory Lanez, Sage the Gemini, Eric Bellinger, and Mishon) | 2014 | — | — | — | — | — | — | — | — | — | — | | Non-album singles |
| "All Down" (Hi-Tone featuring Tory Lanez) | 2014 | — | — | — | — | — | — | — | — | — | — | | Non-album singles |
| "Fuck Love" (Trina featuring Tory Lanez) | 2014 | — | — | — | — | — | — | — | — | — | — | | Non-album singles |
| "I Understand Her Grind" (Blacka Da Don featuring Tory Lanez) | 2014 | — | — | — | — | — | — | — | — | — | — | | Love Notebook Vol. 4 |
| "Slide" (Packy featuring Tory Lanez) | 2014 | — | — | — | — | — | — | — | — | — | — | | Same Difference |
| "Don't Say Nothin'" (Dr. Maleek featuring Tory Lanez and Game) | 2015 | — | — | — | — | — | — | — | — | — | — | | Non-album singles |
| "Down Chick" (Mikey Mass featuring Tory Lanez) | 2015 | — | — | — | — | — | — | — | — | — | — | | Non-album singles |
| "You" (Teko Young City featuring Tory Lanez) | 2015 | — | — | — | — | — | — | — | — | — | — | | Non-album singles |
| "Flex" (Joe Budden featuring Tory Lanez and Fabolous) | 2016 | — | — | — | — | — | — | — | — | — | — | | Rage & the Machine |
| "Drifting" (G-Eazy featuring Chris Brown and Tory Lanez) | 2016 | — | — | — | — | — | — | — | 98 | 33 | — | MC: Gold; RIAA: Platinum | When It's Dark Out |
| "We Can" (Kranium featuring Tory Lanez) | 2016 | — | — | — | — | — | — | — | — | — | — | BPI: Silver; RIAA: Gold | Non-album single |
| "Trust Nobody" (Cashmere Cat featuring Selena Gomez and Tory Lanez) | 2016 | 61 | 46 | 174 | 86 | 69 | — | 92 | — (Note: "Trust Nobody" did not enter the Billboard Hot 100, but peaked at number seven on the Bubbling Under Hot 100 Singles chart.) | — | — | RIAA: Gold | 9 |
| "Radar" (DJ Spinking featuring Tory Lanez) | 2016 | — | — | — | — | — | — | — | — | — | — | | For the Culture |
| "Tek Weh Yuh Heart" (Sean Paul featuring Tory Lanez) | 2016 | — | — | — | — | — | — | — | — | — | — | | Mad Love the Prequel |
| "Throw Myself a Party" (Cashmere Cat featuring Starrah, 2 Chainz, and Tory Lanez) | 2016 | — | — | — | — | — | — | — | — | — | — | | Non-album singles |
| "Damn" (Trina featuring Tory Lanez) | 2016 | — | — | — | — | — | — | — | — | — | — | | Non-album singles |
| "Litty" (Meek Mill featuring Tory Lanez) | 2017 | 54 | — | — | — | — | — | — | 49 | 18 | — | RIAA: Platinum | DC4 |
| "Es rollt" (Maxwell featuring Tory Lanez and Gzuz) | 2017 | — | — | — | — | — | — | — | — | — | — | | Kohldampf |
| "Girlfriend" (Busta Rhymes featuring Vybz Kartel and Tory Lanez) | 2017 | — | — | — | — | — | — | — | — | — | — | | King of the Dancehall |
| "Number One" (Massari featuring Tory Lanez) | 2017 | — | — | — | — | — | — | — | — | — | — | | Tune In |
| "Canada Goose" (Pressa featuring Tory Lanez) | 2017 | — | — | — | — | — | — | — | — | — | — | MC: Platinum | Non-album single |
| "Best Friend" (A Boogie wit da Hoodie featuring Tory Lanez) | 2018 | — | — | — | — | — | — | — | — | — | — | | International Artist |
| "Rondo" (6ix9ine featuring Tory Lanez and Young Thug) | 2018 | 53 | — | — | — | — | — (Note: "Rondo" did not enter the NZ Top 40 Singles Chart, but peaked at number eight on the NZ Heatseeker Singles Chart.) | — | 73 | 38 | — | RIAA: Gold | Day69 |
| "Work Sumn" (Kirko Bangz featuring Tory Lanez and Jacquees) | 2018 | — | — | — | — | — | — | — | — | — | — | | Non-album single |
| "Cold Love" (Classified featuring Tory Lanez) | 2018 | — | — | — | — | — | — | — | — | — | — | | Tomorrow Could Be The Day Things Change |
| "Kika" (6ix9ine featuring Tory Lanez) | 2018 | 13 | 30 | 51 | 25 | 24 | 27 | — | 44 | 19 | — | BPI: Gold; RIAA: Platinum | Dummy Boy |
| "Getcha Roll On" (T-Pain featuring Tory Lanez) | 2019 | — | — | — | — | — | — | — | — | — | — | | 1UP |
| "Babyface Savage" (Bhad Bhabie featuring Tory Lanez) | 2019 | 78 | — | — | — | — | — | — | — | — (Note: "Babyface Savage" did not enter the Hot R&B/Hip-Hop Songs chart, but peaked at number eight on the Bubbling Under R&B/Hip-Hop Singles chart.) | — | | 15 |
| "Peace of Mind" (Sean Kingston featuring Tory Lanez and Davido) | 2019 | — | — | — | — | — | — | — | — | — | — | | Non-album single |
| "Slow for Me" (Melii featuring Tory Lanez) | 2019 | — | — | — | — | — | — | — | — | — | — | | Phases |
| "Summer Love" (Melxdie featuring Tory Lanez) | 2019 | — | — | — | — | — | — | — | — | — | — | | Non-album single |
| "Good Love" (Nafe Smallz featuring Tory Lanez) | 2019 | — | — | — | — | — | — | — | — | — | — | | Good Love |
| "Still Be Friends" (G-Eazy featuring Tory Lanez and Tyga) | 2020 | 67 | — | — | — | — | — | — | — | — | — | RIAA: Platinum; MC: 2x Platinum | These Things Happen Too (Deluxe) |
| "Wrist" (Nghtmre featuring Tory Lanez) | 2020 | — | — | — | — | — | — | — | — | — | — | | Non-album single |
| "You Choose" (Trav featuring Tory Lanez) | 2020 | — | — | — | — | — | — | — | — | — | — | | Nothing Happens Overnight |
| "Cold" (French Montana featuring Tory Lanez) | 2020 | — | — | — | — | — | — | — | — | — | — | | They Got Amnesia |
| "Comeback" (JoJo featuring Tory Lanez and Roc 30) | 2020 | — | — | — | — | — | — | — | — | — | — | | Good to Know |
| "Can I" (Kehlani featuring Tory Lanez) | 2020 | 71 | — | — | — | — | — (Note: "Can I'" did not enter the NZ Top 40 Singles Chart, but peaked at number 13 on the NZ Hot Singles Chart.) | 85 | 50 | 20 | 4 | RIAA: Gold | It Was Good Until It Wasn't |
| "My Salsa" (Franglish featuring Tory Lanez | 2020 | — | — | 5 | — | — | — | — | — | — | — | | Non-album singles |
| "Whats Poppin (Remix)" (Jack Harlow featuring DaBaby, Tory Lanez, and Lil Wayne) | 2020 | 4 | — | — | — | — | — | — (Note: "Whats Poppin'" did not enter the NZ Top 40 Singles Chart, but peaked at number 3 on the NZ Hot Singles Chart.) | 2 | 2 | — | MC: Gold; RIAA: Diamond; RMNZ: Platinum | Thats What They All Say |
| "Simple Things" (DJDS featuring Tory Lanez and Rema) | 2020 | — | — | — | — | — | — | — | — | — | — | | Non-album singles |
| "Wait for Me" (Takis featuring Goody Grace and Tory Lanez) | 2020 | 95 | — | — | — | — | — | — | — | — | — | | Non-album singles |
| "Watching You" (Boef featuring Tory Lanez and Ronnie Flex) | 2020 | — | — | — | — | — | — | — | — | — | — | | Non-album singles |
| "Blackout" (Imanbek featuring Tory Lanez) | 2020 | — | — | — | — | — | — | — | — | — | — | | Non-album singles |
| "After Party Freestyle" (Adam Snow featuring Tory Lanez) | 2020 | — | — | — | — | — | — | — | — | — | — | | Non-album singles |
| "Automatic" (Dyamond Doll featuring Tory Lanez and Legaxy) | 2020 | — | — | — | — | — | — | — | — | — | — | | Dyamond in the Rough |
| "Too Much" (C-Trick featuring Tory Lanez) | 2020 | — | — | — | — | — | — | — | — | — | — | | Sorry 4 Not Being Sorry |
| "You & I" (Danny Jai featuring Tory Lanez) | 2021 | — | — | — | — | — | — | — | — | — | — | | Non-album singles |
| "For Real" (Ombre2Choc Nation featuring Tory Lanez) | 2021 | — | — | — | — | — | — | — | — | — | — | | Non-album singles |
| "Follow Me" (Senhit featuring Tory Lanez) | 2022 | — | — | — | — | — | — | — | — | — | — | | Non-album singles |
| "Main One" (Mario featuring Tory Lanez) | 2022 | — | — | — | — | — | — | — | — | — | | | Non-album singles |
| "Take Shots" (A Boogie wit da Hoodie featuring Tory Lanez) | 2022 | — | — | — | — | — | — | — (Note: "Take Shots" did not enter the NZ Top 40 Singles Chart, but peaked at number 24 on the NZ Hot Singles Chart.) | — (Note: "Take Shots" did not enter the Billboard Hot 100, but peaked at number 23 on the Bubbling Under Hot 100 chart.) | — | — | | Me vs. Myself |
"—" denotes a recording that did not chart or was not released.

=== Promotional singles ===
List of promotional singles, showing year released and album name
| Title | Year | Peak chart positions | | | | | Certifications | Album |
| Title | Year | CAN | UK | US Bub. | US R&B/HH | US R&B | Certifications | Album |
|---|---|---|---|---|---|---|---|---|
| "Diego" | 2015 | — | — | — | — | — | | Non-album single |
| "Dimelo" (with Snakehips) | 2015 | — | — | — | — | — | | All My Friends |
| "In for It" | 2015 | — | — | — | — | — | BPI: Silver | Cruel Intentions |
| "Stuck on You" (featuring BenZel) | 2015 | — | — | — | — | — | | Non-album single |
| "Acting Like" | 2015 | — | — | — | — | — | | Cruel Intentions |
| "Karrueche" | 2015 | — | — | — | — | — | | Non-album single |
| "Traphouse" (featuring Nyce) | 2015 | — | — | — | — | 15 | MC: Platinum | The New Toronto |
| "One Day" | 2015 | — | — | — | — | — | | The New Toronto |
| "Flex" | 2016 | — | — | — | — | — | | I Told You |
| "Cold Hard Love" | 2016 | — | — | — | — | — | | I Told You |
| "B.I.D" | 2018 | 46 | 85 | 4 | — | — | MC: Gold; RIAA: Gold | Memories Don't Die |
| "Dance for Me" (featuring Nav) | 2018 | 61 | — | — | — | 14 | | Memories Don't Die |
| "Hypnotized" | 2018 | 68 | — | — | — | — | | Memories Don't Die |
| "4 Me" | 2018 | — | — | — | — | 19 | | Memories Don't Die |
| "48 Floors" (featuring Mansa) | 2018 | — | — | — | — | 22 | | Memories Don't Die |
| "KJm" | 2018 | — | — | — | — | — | | Love Me Now? |
| "Drip Drip Drip" (featuring Meek Mill) | 2018 | 56 | 82 | 6 | 50 | — | | Love Me Now? |
| "Miami" (featuring Gunna) | 2018 | 89 | 88 | 14 | — | — | | Love Me Now? |
| "W" | 2020 | — | — | — | — | — | | Non-album single |
"—" denotes a recording that did not chart or was not released in that territory.

== Other charted songs ==
List of other charted songs, showing year released and album name
| Title | Year | Peak chart positions | | | | | | | | | Certifications | Album |
| Title | Year | CAN | AUS | NLD | IRE | NZ Hot | UK | US | US R&B/HH | US R&B | Certifications | Album |
|---|---|---|---|---|---|---|---|---|---|---|---|---|
| "Why Don't You Love Me?" | 2018 | — | — | — | — | — | — | — (Note: "Why Don't You Love Me?" did not enter the Billboard Hot 100, but peaked at number 19 on the Bubbling Under Hot 100 chart.) | — | — | | Love Me Now? |
| "The Trade" (featuring Jagged Edge and Jermaine Dupri) | 2019 | — | — | — | — | — | — | — | 48 | 15 | | Chixtape 5 |
| "Beauty in the Benz" (featuring Snoop Dogg) | 2019 | 64 | — | — | — | — | 27 | 70 | 87 | 11 | | Chixtape 5 |
| "The Take" (featuring Chris Brown) | 2019 | 68 | 73 | — | — | 13 | 35 | 66 | 32 | 9 | BPI: Gold; ARIA: Gold; RIAA: Platinum | Chixtape 5 |
| "Broken Promises" | 2019 | — | — | — | — | — | — | — | — | 21 | | Chixtape 5 |
| "Luv Ya Gyal // Love Sounds" (featuring The-Dream) | 2019 | — | — | — | — | — | — | — | — | 24 | | Chixtape 5 |
| "Still Waiting" (featuring Trey Songz) | 2019 | — | — | — | — | — | — | — | — | 23 | | Chixtape 5 |
| "Pricey & Spicy" | 2020 | — | — | — | — | 37 | — | — | — | — | | The New Toronto 3 |
| "Stupid Again" | 2020 | 80 | — | — | 83 | 6 | 66 | 54 | 23 | — | | The New Toronto 3 |
| "10 Fucks" (with Mansa) | 2020 | — | — | — | — | 21 | — | — (Note: "10 Fucks" did not enter the Billboard Hot 100, but peaked at number 15 on the Bubbling Under Hot 100 chart.) | — | — | | The New Toronto 3 |
| "The Coldest Playboy" | 2020 | — | — | — | — | — | — | — (Note: "The Coldest Playboy" did not enter the Billboard Hot 100, but peaked at number 12 on the Bubbling Under Hot 100 chart.) | — | — | | The New Toronto 3 |
| "Money Over Fallouts" | 2020 | 90 | — | — | — | — | — | 97 | 36 | — | | Daystar |
| "A Woman" | 2020 | — | — | — | — | — | — | — | — | 12 | | Daystar |
| "Solar Drive @ Night" | 2020 | — | — | — | — | — | — | — | — | 16 | | Daystar |
| "Enchanted Waterfall" | 2021 | 95 | — | — | — | 28 | — | — | — | 15 | | Alone at Prom |
| "Lavender Sunflower" | 2021 | — | — | — | — | — | — | — | — | — | RIAA: Platinum | Alone at Prom |
| "The Color Violet" | 2022 | 24 | 39 | 2 | 22 | 13 | 36 | 63 | 22 | 11 | BPI: Platinum; RMNZ: Platinum; RIAA: 4× Platinum | Alone at Prom |
| "Sorry 4 What? // LV Belt" | 2022 | 91 | — | — | — | — | — | — | 47 | — | | Sorry 4 What |
| "Crystal Strawberry" | 2023 | — | — | — | — | 33 | — | — | — | — | | Alone at Prom (Deluxe) |
| "Poison Ivy" | 2023 | — | — | — | — | 34 | — | — | — | — | | Alone at Prom (Deluxe) |
| "'Nobody' Land" | 2026 | — | — | — | — | 37 | — | — | — | — | | LOL: Slutty Bass |
| "Revenge of Fargo" | 2026 | — | — | — | — | 35 | — | — | — | — | | Made You Think I Was Gone ...But |
| "Gyal Gimmie" | 2026 | — | — | — | — | 40 | — | — | — | — | | Made You Think I Was Gone ...But |
"—" denotes a recording that did not chart or was not released in that territory.

== Other guest appearances ==
List of non-single guest appearances, with other performing artists, showing year released and album name
| Title | Year | Other artist(s) | Album |
|---|---|---|---|
| "Shawty Girl" | 2010 | Legacy | Your New Favorite Rapper |
| "Accordian [sic]" | 2010 | Legacy | Your New Favorite Rapper |
| "Swag Get at You" | 2011 | Soulja Boy, Trav | Smookey |
| "The One" | 2011 | Sean Kingston | Kings of Kingz |
| "Forget 'Bout It" | 2011 | Sean Kingston | Kings of Kingz |
| "I Need More" | 2011 | Kid Ink | Daydreamers |
| "Drop It Low" | 2011 | Kid Ink | Daydreamers: Leftovers |
| "Elevator Music" (Remix) | 2011 | Kid Ink, Bei Maejor, Bow Wow | none |
| "Kobe Bryant" | 2011 | Ya Boy | Kalifornia Trap |
| "Hair, Nails, Makeup" | 2012 | G4 Boyz | Blood Diamonds |
| "Whoopin Ass" (Remix) | 2012 | King Los | Becoming King |
| "Fresh Out" | 2013 | Joe Moses | From Nothing to Something II |
| "H-Town Celebration Flow" | 2013 | Slim Thug, Paul Wall | Welcome 2 Texas Vol. 3 |
| "On the Set" | 2013 | YG | Just Re'd Up 2 |
| "Till' It's All Gone" | 2013 | Elhae | Champagne Wishes |
| "Fuck That Nigga" | 2013 | DJ Mustard, Ty Dolla $ign, TeeFlii, Constantine | Ketchup |
| "Step Yo Game Up" | 2013 | Dizzy Wright, Jarren Benton | The Golden Age |
| "Hallelujah" | 2013 | Harvey Stripes | A Penny and A Nightmare |
| "Fuckin' Wit Me" | 2013 | Meek Mill | Dreamchasers 3 |
| "Halo" | 2013 | Trae tha Truth | I Am King |
| "Shots of Deleon" | 2014 | Red Café | American Psycho 2 |
| "Step Yo Game Up" | 2014 | Kato, Dizzy Wright, Jarren Benton | Kato's Revenge |
| "Been On" (Remix) | 2014 | G-Eazy, Rockie Fresh | —N/a |
| "10 Shots" | 2014 | Jordan Hollywood, Lil Durk, Yo Gotti | —N/a |
| "Me & My Bitch" | 2014 | YG | My Krazy Life |
| "Lingo" | 2014 | Young Lace, Kellz Cash Out | Talk of the Town |
| "I Bet" | 2014 | Trav, Yo Gotti | Push II |
| "Rollin" | 2014 | YF, KingNevSupreme | I Am YF |
| "We on Our Way" | 2014 | Fredo Santana | Walking Legend |
| "2 Ea$y" | 2014 | Khalil, Blake Kelly | A Long Story Short |
| "Gold" (Remix) | 2014 | Balance | none |
| "Tha 6" | 2014 | Honey Cocaine | Like a Drug |
| "LONER" | 2014 | Rocky Diamonds | Loner |
| "Fuck On" | 2015 | Rocky Diamonds | Influenced |
| "Mexico" | 2015 | Freddie Gibbs | Shadow of a Doubt |
| "MariWanna" | 2016 | King Lil G | Lost in Smoke 2 |
| "Pillowtalk" (Remix) | 2016 | Zayn Malik, Lil Wayne | none |
| "Can't Get Enough" | 2016 | Casey Veggies | Customized Greatly Vol. 4: The Return of The Boy |
| "Wishing" (Remix) | 2016 | DJ Drama, Fabolous, Trey Songz, Chris Brown, Jhene Aiko | none |
| "She Don't Love U" | 2016 | Spectacular, Rich Homie Quan, Compton Menace | none |
| "Marriott Hotel" | 2016 | Dosseh | Yuri |
| "Same Sh*t" | 2017 | Krept and Konan | 7 Nights |
| "Droptop in the Rain" | 2017 | Ty Dolla $ign | Beach House 3 |
| "Pressure" | 2017 | Jeezy, Rick Ross | Pressure |
| "Steady" | 2018 | Bebe Rexha | Expectations |
| "Senseless" (Remix) | 2018 | Stefflon Don | none |
| "Shootin Shots" | 2018 | Trey Songz, Ty Dolla $ign | 11 |
| "Wrist Watch" | 2018 | Trey Songz | 28 |
| "RONDO" | 2018 | 6ix9ine, Young Thug | Day69 |
| "Kika" | 2018 | 6ix9ine | Dummy Boy |
| "Getcha Roll On" | 2019 | T-Pain | 1UP |
| "All These Bands" | 2019 | PnB Rock | TrapStar Turnt PopStar |
| "HML" (Remix) | 2019 | Soulja Boy | How Can You Blame Me |
| "Lurkin" | 2019 | Chris Brown | Indigo |
| "Tell Me How You Feel" | 2019 | Chris Brown | Indigo (Extended edition) |
| "Suge" (Remix) | 2019 | Joyner Lucas | none |
| "Stuck With It" | 2019 | Guapdad 4000 | Dior Deposits |
| "First Time" | 2019 | Krept and Konan, Spice | Revenge Is Sweet |
| "Hot Gyal" | 2019 | XXXTentacion, Mavado | Bad Vibes Forever |
| "Help" | 2020 | Lil Wayne | Funeral |
| "Daylight" | 2020 | Steve Aoki | Neon Future IV |
| "Spain" | 2020 | Kodak Black, Jackboy | Bill Israel |
| "Adrenalina" | 2021 | Jala Brat | Futura |
| "Bugia" | 2022 | Lazza | Sirio |
| "Bad Then a Beach" | 2022 | Chris Brown | Breezy |
| "Free Pedro Interlude" | 2023 | Top5, 6ixbuzz | Pedro Activated |
| "Hou's World" | 2024 | Houdini, Pressa, NorthSideBenji, 6ixbuzz | HOU I'M MEANT TO BE |

== Production discography ==
List of production and songwriting credits (excluding guest appearances, interpolations, and samples) for other artists
| Track(s) | Year | Credit | Artist(s) | Album |
|---|---|---|---|---|
| 8. "Been Getting Money"; (featuring Akon) | 2014 | Songwriter | Jeezy | Seen It All: The Autobiography |
| 15. "My Niggas"; (featuring August Alsina) | 2015 | Songwriter | Meek Mill | Dreams Worth More Than Money |
| 3. "Actin' Up"; (featuring Dom Kennedy) | 2015 | Songwriter | Casey Veggies | Live & Grow |
| 6. "All in My Head (Flex)"; (featuring Fetty Wap) | 2016 | Songwriter | Fifth Harmony | 7/27 |
| 4. "Novacane" | 2019 | Songwriter | Tyla Yaweh | Heart Full of Rage |
| 2. "In My Nightmares" | 2019 | Songwriter | Mariah the Scientist | MASTER |
| 5. "Reminders" | 2019 | Songwriter | Mariah the Scientist | MASTER |
| 7. "Beetlejuice" | 2019 | Songwriter | Mariah the Scientist | MASTER |
| 9. "Disclosure"; (featuring Mansa) | 2019 | Songwriter | Mariah the Scientist | MASTER |
| 3. "Back to You" | 2019 | Additional vocals, songwriter | Cashmere Cat | Princess Catgirl |
| 8. "Show Me Love"; (featuring Miguel) | 2020 | Songwriter | Alicia Keys | Alicia |
| 17. "Drunk" | 2024 | Songwriter | ¥$ | Vultures 2 |

== Music videos ==
=== As lead artist ===
List of music videos as a lead artist, showing year released and director
| Title | Year | Director(s) |
|---|---|---|
| "All I Want Is You Freestyle" | 2010 | Tory Lanez |
| "Dark Fantasy Freestyle" | 2010 | Vulpine Films |
| "Aston Martin Music" (Remix) | 2010 | Vulpine Films |
| "Styll" | 2011 | Tung Twisted |
| "Skeeming" | 2011 | Tory Lanez |
| "Swavey in Paris" | 2011 | Tory Lanez |
| "Shot 4 Later" | 2011 | Motionworks Cinema |
| "Swaveman" | 2011 | Motionworks Cinema |
| "Apartment 310" | 2012 | Tory Lanez |
| "Konichiwa" | 2012 | Grizz Lee |
| "Friday the 13th" | 2012 | Tory Lanez |
| "Know What's Up (The Take)" (featuring Kirko Bangz) | 2013 | Tyler Lee |
| "Hate Me on the Low (The Suggestion)" | 2013 | Tory Lanez, Marlon Santini |
| "Shit Freestyle" | 2013 | Tory Lanez, Arthur Garibay |
| "Girl Is Mine" | 2014 | Tory Lanez, Arthur Garibay |
| "The Godfather" | 2014 | Andy Hines |
| "The Mission" | 2014 | Christian Breslauer, Tory Lanez |
| "Priceless" | 2015 | Zac Facts |
| "Henny in Hand" | 2015 | Andre Pines |
| "Mama Told Me" | 2015 | Zac Facts |
| "Acting Like" | 2015 | Zac Facts |
| "Diego" | 2015 | Zac Facts, Tory Lanez |
| "Say It" | 2015 | Walu |
| "B.L.O.W." | 2015 | Walu |
| "Traphouse" (featuring Nyce) | 2015 | Zac Facts |
| "LA Confidential" | 2016 | none |
| "Came 4 Me" | 2016 | Zac Facts |
| "Line Up the Flex" (with ASAP Ferg) | 2016 | Zac Facts |
| "Real Addresses" | 2016 | Zac Facts |
| "Luv" | 2016 | Zac Facts |
| "Other Side" | 2016 | Zac Facts |
| "Shooters" | 2017 | Zac Facts |
| "DopeMan Go" | 2017 | Zac Facts |
| "Anyway" | 2017 | Mid Jordan |
| "Loud Pack" (featuring Dave East) | 2017 | Mid Jordan |
| "Bal Harbour" (featuring A$AP Ferg) | 2017 | Tristan Zammit |
| "Skrt Skrt" | 2018 | Zac Facts |
| "Real Thing" (featuring Future) | 2018 | Zac Facts and Swavey |
| "Benevolent" | 2018 | Mid Jordan |
| "B.I.D." | 2018 | Tory Lanez and Mid Jordan |
| "Pa Mi" (with Ozuna) | 2018 | Tory Lanez, Fernando Lugo and Mid Jordan |
| "Talk to Me" (with Rich the Kid) | 2018 | Zac Facts |
| "Numbers Out the Gym" | 2018 | Mid Jordan and Tory Lanez |
| "B.A.B.Y" (featuring Moneybagg Yo) | 2018 | Tory Lanez |
| "Kendall Jenner Music" | 2018 | Mid Jordan |
| "Drip Drip Drip" (featuring Meek Mill) | 2018 | Tory Lanez and Mid Jordan |
| "If It Ain't Right" (featuring A Boogie Wit Da Hoodie) | 2018 | Mid Jordan |
| "Ferris Wheel" (featuring Trippie Redd) | 2019 | Mid Jordan |
| "ThE Run oFF" | 2019 | Zac Facts |
| "Freaky" | 2019 | Christian Breslauer |
| "What Happened To The Kids" | 2019 | Tory Lanez and Mid Jordan |
| "Broke Leg" (with Quavo and Tyga) | 2019 | Christian Breslauer |
| "Not Today" (with Dappy) | 2019 | Jay Parpworth |
| "Pop Out Freestyle" (Playboy Mix) | 2019 | none |
| "Melee" | 2019 | Tory Lanez |
| "Forever" | 2019 | Mid Jordan |
| "Pull Up" (with Davo) | 2019 | none |
| "Watch For Your Soul" | 2019 | Mid Jordan |
| "Jerry Sprunger" (with T-Pain) | 2019 | Mid Jordan |
| "Beauty in the Benz" (featuring Snoop Dogg) | 2019 | Child |
| "Numb" (with Brianna Cash) | 2020 | Child |
| "K Lo K" (featuring Fivio Foreign) | 2020 | Tory Lanez and Nick Belotti |
| "Broke in a Minute" | 2020 | Tory Lanez |
| "W" | 2020 | Tory Lanez |
| "Do the Most" | 2020 | Mid Jordan and Tory Lanez |
| "Who Needs Love" | 2020 | Mid Jordan and Tory Lanez |
| "Dope Boy's Diary" | 2020 | Tory Lanez and Anaiya Farias |
| "Temperature Rising" | 2020 | Christian Breslauer |
| "Stupid Again" | 2020 | Christian Breslauer |
| "392" (with VV$ KEN) | 2020 | Tory Lanez |
| "Most High" | 2020 | Edgar Esteves |
| "In The Air" | 2020 | none |
| "Jokes On Me" | 2020 | DP: Sam Brave |
| "Solar Drive @ Night" | 2020 | @loganfieldsfilms |
| "Boink Boink" | 2020 | Tory Lanez |
| "Motorboat" | 2021 | none |
| "1 Hitter" (with VV$ KEN) | 2021 | Tory Lanez |
| "Big Tipper" (featuring Melii and Lil Wayne) | 2021 | Christian Breslauer |
| "F.E.E.L.S." (with Chris Brown) | 2021 | Christian Breslauer |
| "And This Is Just The Intro" | 2021 | Tory Lanez |
| "Y.D.L.R." (Official Lyric Video) | 2021 | none |
| "Band A Man" | 2021 | Tory Lanez |
| "SKAT" (featuring DaBaby) | 2021 | Christian Breslauer and Tory Lanez |
| "Grah Tah Tah" (featuring Kodak Black) | 2021 | Christian Breslauer and Tory Lanez |
| "When Its Dark (E-NFT) 8-10-21" Freestyle | 2021 | none |
| "Tuh" (featuring EST Gee and VV$ Ken) | 2021 | Stylo and Tory Lanez |
| "Lady of Namek" | 2021 | Mid Jordan |
| "'87 Stingray" | 2021 | Mid Jordan |
| "Enchanted Waterfall" | 2021 | Mid Jordan |
| "The Color Violet" (Live) | 2022 | Mid Jordan |
| "CAP" | 2022 | Justice and Tory Lanez |
| "Taken Care" | 2022 | none |
| "Florida Sh*t" | 2022 | Tory Lanez |
| "Mucky James" | 2022 | Tory Lanez and Stylo |
| "I Like" | 2022 | Sam Brave and Tory Lanez |
| "Shot Clock Violations" | 2022 | none |
| "City Boy Summer" | 2022 | none |
| "It Doesn't Matter" | 2022 | Sam Brave |
| "Why Did I" | 2022 | Tory Lanez and Chris Mareno |
| "Sorry 4 What? // LV BELT" | 2022 | none |
| "Ginobili" (with The Verse) | 2023 | LK Visuals |
| "The Color Violet" | 2023 | Justice Silvera |
| "Hurts Me" (featuring Yoko Gold and Trippie Redd) | 2023 | none |
| "Lavender Sunflower" | 2023 | none |
| "Ballad of a Badman" | 2024 | none |

=== As featured artist ===
List of music videos as a featured artist, showing year released and director
| Title | Year | Director(s) |
|---|---|---|
| "Swag Get At You" (Soulja Boy featuring Trav and Tory Lanez) | 2011 | Soulja Boy |
| "The One" (Sean Kingston featuring Tory Lanez) | 2011 | none |
| "10 Shots" (Jordan Hollywood featuring Yo Gotti, Lil Durk and Tory Lanez) | 2014 | Snapback Films |
| "Lord Knows" (Meek Mill featuring Tory Lanez) | 2015 | Spike Jordan |
| "Pull Up" (SYPH featuring Tory Lanez) | 2015 | none |
| "Ride" (STK Rax featuring Tory Lanez and AyFiF) | 2016 | none |
| "Pierre Balmain" (Akillezz featuring Tory Lanez) | 2016 | Ben Griffin |
| "Drifting" (G-Eazy featuring Chris Brown and Tory Lanez) | 2016 | Daniel CZ |
| "Tek Weh Yuh Heart" (Sean Paul featuring Tory Lanez) | 2016 | Stash Box Productions & Karena Evans |
| "Flex" (Joe Budden featuring Tory Lanez and Fabolous) | 2016 | Adaeze Njaka |
| "Trust Nobody" (Cashmere Cat featuring Selena Gomez and Tory Lanez) | 2016 | Jake Schreier |
| "We Can" (Kranium featuring Tory Lanez) | 2016 | Zac Facts |
| "Damn" (Trina featuring Tory Lanez) | 2017 | Trina |
| "Litty" (Meek Mill featuring Tory Lanez) | 2017 | Spike Jordan |
| "Girlfriend" (Busta Rhymes featuring Vybz Kartel and Tory Lanez) | 2017 | Busta Rhymes and Benny Boom |
| "Canada Goose" (Pressa featuring Tory Lanez) | 2017 | Pressa |
| "Miss You" (Cashmere Cat, Major Lazer and Tory Lanez) | 2018 | Austin Peters |
| "Miss You" (Vertical Video/Version 2) (Cashmere Cat, Major Lazer and Tory Lanez) | 2018 | Austin Peters |
| "Whats Poppin" (Remix) (Jack Harlow featuring DaBaby, Tory Lanez and Lil Wayne) | 2020 | Eif Rivera |
| "My Salsa" (Franglish featuring Tory Lanez) | 2020 | Danielle Ekoule |
| "Adrenalina" (Jala Brat featuring Tory Lanez) | 2021 | Kristjan Podgornik |
| "Chauffeur" (Diljit Dosanjh featuring Tory Lanez and IKKY) | 2022 | Warner Music India |
