= Peterson (album) =

Studio album by Tory Lanez
- Released: March 7, 2025
- Recorded: c. February 21, 2025 – March 7, 2025
- Length: 87:26
- Label: One Umbrella
- Producers: 2one2; AraabMuzik; Cam Raleigh; DLo Beatz; Joe Spinelli; Kel Santiago; King Midas; Lex Luger; Mix By Nick; Roselilah; Sebastian Lopez; Squale; YoungDaveBangin

Tory Lanez chronology
Sorry 4 What (2022)	Peterson (2025)	LOL: Slutty Bass (2026)

Peterson (stylized in all caps) is the eighth studio album by Canadian singer and rapper Tory Lanez. It was released on March 7, 2025, through One Umbrella Records. The album features guest appearances from Davo, Jaquain, King Midas, Max B, Paul McKay, SOS, and various members of Lanez's family, including his son Kai'Lon, his father Sonstar, and his siblings DSTNY, Yoko Gold, and Wolfgang. Production was handled by a variety of record producers, including AraabMuzik, Joe Spinelli, Lex Luger, Roselilah, and Sebastian Lopez, among others. It marks his first album in three years since the release of Sorry 4 What (2022), and it is the sequel to his fifth album, Daystar (2020).

== Background ==
On September 25, 2020, Lanez released his fifth studio album, Daystar, amid criminal allegations that he had shot Megan Thee Stallion in her foot earlier in the year; several songs on that album found him denying the allegations. Due to its surrounding controversy, many critics opted not to review it. Two years later, in December 2022, Lanez was convicted on three felony charges in relation to the shooting, and was subsequently jailed; he would be sentenced to 10 years in prison on August 8, 2023, and is currently serving out that sentence in the California Correctional Institution. While incarcerated, he has continued to release music under the "Lost Tapes" and "Prison Tapes" song series, and released a deluxe edition of his album Alone at Prom (2021) in 2023. Lanez has claimed that after "20 [...] to 30 something fuck ups and mistakes", him and his engineer were able to produce "studio-quality material from behind bars".

On February 20, 2025, a phone call from Lanez was shared to social media, in which he outlined plans to record and release a full-length album within the following three weeks, citing fellow Canadians Drake, PartyNextDoor, and the Weeknd as inspirations. A video of him rapping on the prison phone before a riot started behind him would surface on February 24.

On February 28, during a phoned-in appearance on the Full Send podcast, he revealed that the album would be released on March 7, and gave insight into its process.

[...] This is a very crazy task that has never, ever been done. You have to think [about] everybody who's done music from prison or who's done music from jail. Usually, it's like this. Over the phone, shit-sounding, like, 'Yo, this sucks.' That's not what I'm doing here. [...] It's professional. It's going to sound exactly like a Tory Lanez album. But just, the pain is there, the hunger is there. You know, the tears, the cries are there. It's a lot of emotion into it, but it's the first ever professionally recorded prison album. This has never been done before.

On March 4, Lanez shared the album's title and cover art.

== Critical reception ==
Professional ratings
Review scores
Source	Rating
Rolling Stone	2.5/5 stars

Mos Reeves in his review for Rolling Stone wrote that "Tory drapes Peterson in self-centered liberation dreams and misogynoir sleaze. Give him credit: he effectively builds on his self-described villain persona to stoke curiosity, and perhaps even sympathy, though it’s likely his detractors will simply recoil at his true intentions."

== Track listing ==
Peterson track listing
No.	Title	Writer(s)	Producer(s)	Length
1.	"Intro"	Daystar Shemuel Shua Peterson	Joe Spinelli; Kel Santiago; Mix By Nick; Squale	1:03
2.	"Free Me" (featuring Jaquain)	D. Peterson	King Midas; Sebastian Lopez; NeNe	4:42
3.	"Sneeze Wrong"	D. Peterson	King Midas; Sebastian Lopez; NeNe	3:51
4.	"White Lightning"	D. Peterson	Smash David; Joey Ramirez; Sean Turk; King Midas; Monica Evans	3:30
5.	"Guide Me Through the Storm" (featuring Sonstar and Paul McKay)	D. Peterson	King Midas; YoungDaveBangin; Kxvi; Play Picasso; Johan Chavez	5:38
6.	"9$ide x Amethyst"	D. Peterson	Roselilah; King Midas	3:42
7.	"MAWA Interlude x Lunch Tray" (featuring Max B)	D. Peterson	2one2; Gyzbanksitin	3:35
8.	"$ailor Moon" (featuring King Midas and Davo)	D. Peterson	AraabMuzik; Roselilah; King Midas	4:34
9.	"Verdict Day x Lawyer Fees Interlude"	D. Peterson	Sebastian Lopez; NeNe	4:14
10.	"Lawyer Fees"	D. Peterson	Sebastian Lopez; NeNe	2:51
11.	"Slipping x Falling" (featuring Yoko Gold and Paul McKay)	D. Peterson; Moses Peterson; Paul McKay	Rowan	5:03
12.	"Charlie Row x Wishing Well" (featuring Yoko Gold)	D. Peterson; M. Peterson	Sebastian Lopez; Cryptic; Tilt; DLo Beatz; Tommy Parker; FELI CIANO; Luz The Producer; Aki The Producer; TURRINI; NeNe	4:34
13.	"Phone Secs x FaceTime" (featuring King Midas)	D. Peterson; Justin Lay	Roselilah; 2one2; King Midas; DLo Beatz; Sebastian Lopez; cash3n; NeNe	4:28
14.	"T.D.F x LA County Jail" (featuring DSTNY)	D. Peterson	Lex Luger; Cam Raleigh; King Midas; Sebastian Lopez; Dr. Zeuz; E.C Fresco; NeNe	3:49
15.	"Gangland x Fargentina 4EVR" (featuring Wolfgang Peterson and Kai'Lon Peterson)	D. Peterson; Wolfgang Peterson; Kai’Lon Peterson	King Midas; 2one2; Squale; Chaz Jackson	7:13
16.	"I Fxcked a Lady Cop"	D. Peterson	King Midas	4:32
17.	"My Shayla * Spice-Rilla" (featuring DSTNY)	D. Peterson; Danielle Kemp	Roselilah; King Midas	6:08
18.	"Back Out$ide" (featuring SOS, DSTNY, and King Midas)	D. Peterson; Lay; Kemp	Roselilah; YoungDaveBangin; King Midas; Sebastian Lopez; NeNe	3:40
19.	"TB's Interlude" (live phone recording)	D. Peterson	2one2; DLo Beatz; cash3n; NeNe	2:49
20.	"Free Tory"	D. Peterson	Roselilah; King Midas	6:35
Total length:				86:00

=== Notes ===
- "Gangland x Fargentina 4EVR" contains a sample of "Whoomp! (There It Is)", written by Stephen Gibson and Cecil Glenn, and performed by Tag Team.

== Charts ==
Chart performance for Peterson
Chart (2025)	Peak position
Canadian Albums (Billboard)	38
Portuguese Albums (AFP)	164
UK Album Downloads (Official Charts)	74
US Billboard 200	25
US Top R&B/Hip-Hop Albums (Billboard)	11

== See also ==
- Thank You for Using GTL (2020) by Drakeo the Ruler, a mixtape entirely recorded over Global Tel Link phone calls
