= The Most High =

The Most High may refer to:

- El Elyon, God of Israel.
- Al-Ala, chapter in the Quran.
- Hypsistos, ancient Greek divine epithet.
- "The Most High", a song by Tory Lanez from Daystar
