= Adidas (disambiguation) =

Adidas is a German sports apparel manufacturer.

Adidas or A.D.I.D.A.S. may also refer to:

- Adidas SC, a football club in Samoa
- "Adidas", a song by Tory Lanez from The New Toronto 3
- "A.D.I.D.A.S." (Korn song), a 1997 song by Korn
- "A.D.I.D.A.S." (Killer Mike song), a 2003 song by Killer Mike
- A.D.I.D.A.S., or All Day I Dream About Spittin', a 2010 album by Ras Kass
- "A.D.I.D.A.S." ("All Day I Dream About Shush"), a 2015 song by Little Mix from their album Get Weird
