= Made You Think I Was Gone ...But =

Studio album by Tory Lanez
- Released: July 17, 2026
- Genres: Hip-hop; R&B
- Length: 76:55
- Label: One Umbrella Records
- Producers: Play Picasso; Plu2o Nash; Smash David; Roselilah; Mike Wavvs; Cashen

Tory Lanez chronology
LOL: Slutty Bass (2026)	Made You Think I Was Gone ...But (2026)

Made You Think I Was Gone ...But is the tenth studio album by Canadian rapper and singer Tory Lanez. It was released on July 17, 2026, through One Umbrella. The project is structured as a double album, with the first disc dedicated to hip-hop and the second focusing on R&B, reflecting the two musical styles that have defined much of his career. Made You Think I Was Gone...But was produced by Play Picasso, Plu2o Nash, Smash David, Roselilah, Mike Wavvs and Cashen.

== Background ==
Two unreleased songs from Tory Lanez had appeared on the internet before the album’s release. It was alleged that the songs were real, leading to rumors about him releasing new music while in prison. On July 15 Lanez announced the album through social media with the message "Made You Think I Was Gone...But 7.17", revealing that it would be divided into two discs labelled "Disc 1: Rap" (Fargo’s Revenge) and "Disc 2: R&B." (Fargo’s Heartbreak). Made You Think I Was Gone ...But was released on July 17, 2026, through Lanez's independent label, One Umbrella.

The album artwork references the prison stabbing Lanez survived in May 2025, depicting a bandaged figure that alludes to the injuries he sustained during the attack.

== Reception ==
Writing for Ratings Game Music, Quincy praised the album's versatility, highlighting Lanez's vocal performances, production, and ability to alternate between rap and R&B across the project's two discs. While noting that several tracks felt reminiscent of the artist's earlier work, the review concluded that the album remained a strong release, particularly commending its production quality and emotional range. HotNewHipHop described the project as a return to the dual musical approach that has characterized much of Lanez's career, with the first disc focusing on hip-hop and the second emphasizing melodic R&B. The publication noted that the 23-track album revisits the sounds that established his fanbase.

== Track listing ==
Disc 1: Fargo's Revenge (Rap)
No.	Title	Writer(s)	Producer(s)	Length
1.	"Revenge of Fargo"	Daystar Shemuel Shua Peterson; Jesse Gumer; Görkem Akyüz; Kevin Mitchell; Michael Washington, Jr.; Plu2o Nash	2one2; Gyz; Kevin Mitchell; Mike Wavvs; Plu2o Nash	3:18
2.	"Crodie from the 9 // Guy in My City"	Peterson; Gumer; Akyüz; Daniel Gonzalez	2one2; Gyz; Play Picasso; Mingo4u	3:56
3.	"Who?"	Peterson; Roshwita Larisha Bacha; Samuel David Jimenez	Roselilah; Smash David	4:19
4.	"Jalen Brunson"	Peterson	FortyOneSix; Beatmenace	3:04
5.	"Heartbreak from Cell 210"	Peterson; Bacha	Roselilah	2:08
6.	"Deen & AB // SGA"	Peterson	Smash David; O12; LAF Collective	4:00
7.	"Gyal Gimmie"	Peterson		2:23
8.	"Hasty Market // Toronto" (with Hollywood Sos)	Peterson; Hollywood Sos; Gumer; Akyüz	2one2; Gyz	6:42
9.	"Penthouse Blue"	Peterson; Gumer; Cashen; Elaye Slattery	2one2; Cashen; Elxyee	4:13
10.	"Many Men Pt. 2" (featuring VV$ Ken)	Peterson; Kendior Francois; Reuel Ethan Walker	Reuel	3:05
11.	"GYMR"	Peterson		3:00
12.	"9Side Bodmon"	Peterson	Dizzy Banko; Beatmenace	2:25
Total length:				40:29

Disc 2: Fargo's Heartbreak (R&B)
No.	Title	Writer(s)	Producer(s)	Length
1.	"The Over Song"	Peterson; Bacha	Roselilah	3:42
2.	"Swangin'"	Peterson; Gumer; George Herrera	2one2; G40	3:17
3.	"Favorite Eater"	Peterson; Gumer; Mitchell	2one2; Kevin Mitchell	3:58
4.	"Clouded // TJ's Interlude"	Peterson; Tvee Sizzle; Gumer; Joseph Zamboulias; Luka Berman	2one2; DLo Beatz; Gabe Lucas	3:44
5.	"Kody"	Peterson; Gumer; Carlos Martin	2one2; Rowan	4:08
6.	"Streets Want You Back"	Peterson; Gumer; Ashanti Daniel Guerrero	2one2; Daniel East	2:16
7.	"Dancers Remorse (Sin City)"	Peterson; Gumer; Cashen; prodcalig; Martin	2one2; Cashen; prodcalig; Rowan	3:45
8.	"Scarborough to Dubai"	Peterson; Maximilian McFarlin; Bacha	MacShooter; Roselilah	2:40
9.	"First Day Out" (R&B version)	Peterson; Gumer; Francesco Carlesi	2one2; Fraka	3:09
10.	"Wrong Moves"	Peterson	Yume	1:37
11.	"I Know Everything"	Peterson; Gumer; Guerrero; Damoo	2one2; Daniel East; Damoo	2:48
Total length:				36:26

== Charts ==
Chart performance for Made You Think I Was Gone ...But
Chart (2026)	Peak position
Canadian Albums (Billboard)	23
Portuguese Albums (AFP)	117
US Billboard 200	33
US Top R&B/Hip-Hop Albums (Billboard)	11
