= Broke in a Minute =

Single by Tory Lanez

Single by Tory Lanez

from the album The New Toronto 3
- Released: February 7, 2020
- Genre: Hip hop
- Length: 2:12
- Label: Interscope
- Songwriters: Daystar Peterson; Anthony Woart Jr.
- Producer: Papi Yerr

Tory Lanez singles chronology
"K Lo K" (2020)	"Broke in a Minute" (2020)	"W" (2020)

Music video
- "Broke in a Minute" on YouTube

"Broke in a Minute" is a song by Canadian singer and rapper Tory Lanez, released on February 7, 2020 as the lead single from his mixtape The New Toronto 3 (2020). The song was produced by Papi Yerr.

== Background and composition ==
Sajae Elder of The Fader described the track as "bass-heavy". Lyrically, the song is about Tory Lanez becoming rich; he also sings about how he used to work at Denny's and name-drops many brand names. In an Instagram post promoting the song's music video, Lanez revealed that "Broke in a Minute" was originally a freestyle to "Shotta Flow" by NLE Choppa.

== Music video ==
An accompanying music video was released alongside the single. It features Tory Lanez showing his luxurious products and money, and dancing.

== Charts ==
Chart performance for "Broke in a Minute"
Chart (2020)	Peak position
Canada Hot 100 (Billboard)	76
New Zealand Hot Singles (RMNZ)	22
US Billboard Hot 100	64
US Hot R&B/Hip-Hop Songs (Billboard)	28

== Certifications ==
Region	Certification	Certified units/sales
New Zealand (RMNZ)	Gold	15,000^{‡}
United Kingdom (BPI)	Silver	200,000^{‡}
United States (RIAA)	Platinum	1,000,000^{‡}
^{‡} Sales+streaming figures based on certification alone.
