= Sorry 4 What =

Studio album by Tory Lanez
- Released: September 30, 2022
- Recorded: 2021–22
- Genres: Hip-hop; R&B
- Length: 75:51
- Labels: One Umbrella; Create

Tory Lanez chronology
Alone at Prom (2021)	Sorry 4 What (2022)	Peterson (2025)

Singles from Sorry 4 What
- 1. "Why Did I" Released: September 23, 2022

Sorry 4 What is the seventh studio album by Canadian singer and rapper Tory Lanez. It was released through One Umbrella on September 30, 2022. The album features guest appearances from A Boogie wit da Hoodie and Yoko Gold, Lanez's younger brother. Production was handled by a variety of record producers, including Lanez himself, Smash David, Play Picasso, Jakik, Half, and Sergio R., among others. It was supported by one single, "Why Did I", which was released alongside the accompanying official music video on the same day that the album was released.

== Background ==
Exactly two weeks before the release of the album, Lanez announced its title and release date, while he also revealed that it would have 18 tracks before adding two more later.

== Singles ==
Sorry 4 What was supported by one single. The lead single, "Why Did I" was released on September 23, 2022. The music video was released accompanying the single.

== Commercial performance ==
Sorry 4 What debuted at number ten on the US Billboard 200 chart, earning 25,500 album-equivalent units (including 1,000 copies in pure album sales) in its first week. This became Tory Lanez's seventh US top-ten debut on the chart. The album also accumulated a total of 32.06 million on-demand official streams from the set's songs.

== Track listing ==
Sorry 4 What track listing
No.	Title	Writer(s)	Producer(s)	Length
1.	"Sorry 4 What? // LV Belt"	Daystar Peterson; Samuel Jimenez; Daniel Gonzalez	Tory Lanez; Smash David; Play Picasso	2:34
2.	"Bad Bitches Wrk @ Taboo"	D. Peterson; D. Gonzalez; Blair Ferguson; Beck Norling; Jake Wogan; Calynn Green; Half	Tory Lanez; Play Picasso; Blk; Calynn; Pilgrim; Jakik; Half	2:57
3.	"Where 2 Start"	D. Peterson; D. Gonzalez; Wogan; Half; Eliasodt	Tory Lanez; Play Picasso; Jakik; Half; Eliasodt	4:14
4.	"Sex Songs"	D. Peterson; D. Gonzalez; Ian Stoffer	Tory Lanez; Play Picasso; IanoBeatz	4:22
5.	"Hennessy Memories"	D. Peterson; D. Gonzalez; Caleb Bryant; Jesse Calentine	Tory Lanez; Play Picasso; Bryant; Calentine	3:22
6.	"Not Tricking // Black Keys"	D. Peterson; D. Gonzalez; Ferguson; BounceGoHard; C Muney; Mike	Tory Lanez; Play Picasso; Blk; BounceGoHard; C Muney; Mike	4:11
7.	"Y.D.S. // Iggy DelDia"	D. Peterson; D. Gonzalez; Sergio Romero; Nedim Melkic	Tory Lanez; Play Picasso; Sergio R.; Nedo	4:02
8.	"This Ain't Working"	D. Peterson; D. Gonzalez; Edward Davadi	Tory Lanez; Play Picasso; Edsclusive	4:11
9.	"Hurting Me"	D. Peterson; D. Gonzalez; Onassis Morris; Apollo 7ven; Ace Lavine; Prince Flea	Tory Lanez; Play Picasso; Onassis; Apollo 7ven; Ace Lavine; Prince Flea	2:44
10.	"Why Did I"	D. Peterson; D. Gonzalez; Romero; Carson Hackney	Play Picasso; Sergio R.; Carson Hackney	2:25
11.	"No More Parties in LA"	D. Peterson; Charles Dumazer; D. Gonzalez	C-Sick; Play Picasso	3:58
12.	"Anymore // Fuck Boy Intentions"	D. Peterson; D. Gonzalez; Romero; Big Lou; Soundsbysomewhere; 99hurts	Tory Lanez; Play Picasso; Big Lou; Soundsbysomewhere; 99hurts	7:34
13.	"Red Casamigos"	D. Peterson; D. Gonzalez; Romero; Marrybeats; Bjimmes	Tory Lanez; Play Picasso; Sergio R.; Marrybeats; Bjimmes	2:52
14.	"Understand"	D. Peterson; D. Gonzalez; Tyler James; Jay Longo; Benjii Yang; Rob	Tory Lanez; Play Picasso; James; Longo; Benjii Yang; Rob	4:19
15.	"Casa-Freak-Hoes"	D. Peterson; D. Gonzalez; Jeffery Robinson; Wesley Attipou	Tory Lanez; Play Picasso; Fresh Ayr; WW	3:37
16.	"Role Call" (featuring A Boogie wit da Hoodie)	D. Peterson; Artist Dubose; D. Gonzalez; Sl	Tory Lanez; Play Picasso; Sl	2:54
17.	"Rare L"	D. Peterson; D. Gonzalez; Nate Rodriguez	Tory Lanez; Play Picasso; LilMexicoBeatz	3:57
18.	"Albany Bahamas"	D. Peterson; D. Gonzalez; Romero; Sebastian Lopez; Diego Avendano; Kevin Price	Play Picasso; Sergio R.; 1Mind; Diego Ave; Go Grizzly	3:37
19.	"Collection" (featuring Yoko Gold)	D. Peterson; Moses Peterson; D. Gonzalez; Leutrim Beqiri; Thomas Mkrtchyan	Tory Lanez; Play Picasso; Byrd; Armotunez	3:45
20.	"The Vent"	D. Peterson; D. Gonzalez; Juice a Cuice; Kiri Gerbs; Jonathan Lee	Tory Lanez; Play Picasso; Juice & Kiri; BAND!T	4:05
Total length:				75:51

== Charts ==
Chart performance for Sorry 4 What
Chart (2022)	Peak position
Belgian Albums (Ultratop Flanders)	188
Canadian Albums (Billboard)	5
Dutch Albums (Album Top 100)	54
UK Albums (Official Charts)	49
US Billboard 200	10
US Top R&B/Hip-Hop Albums (Billboard)	4
