= Tory Lanez =

Canadian singer (born 1992)

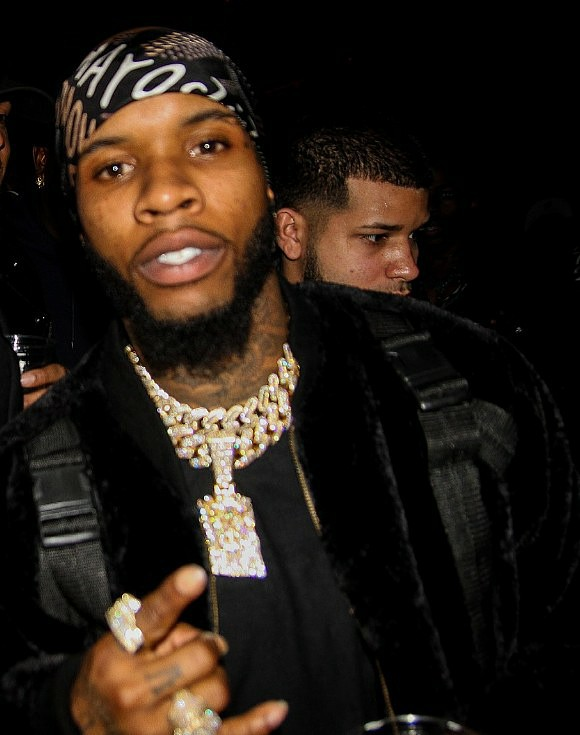
- Lanez in 2018
- Born: Daystar Shemuel Shua Peterson; July 27, 1992 (age 34); Brampton, Ontario, Canada
- Other names: Argentina Fargo; Swavey Fargo
- Occupations: Singer; rapper; songwriter; record producer
- Years active: 2009–present
- Spouse: Raina Chassagne (m. 2023; sep. 2024)
- Children: 1
- Musical career
- Genres: R&B; hip-hop; dancehall; pop
- Works: Tory Lanez discography
- Labels: One Umbrella (current); Interscope; Mad Love; Time Is Money (former)
- Criminal information
- Status: Incarcerated
- Convictions: Assault with a firearm; illegal possession of a firearm; negligent discharge of a firearm
- Penalty: 10 years in prison

Details
- Injured: Megan Jovon Ruth Pete
- Date apprehended: December 23, 2022
- Imprisoned at: California Men's Colony, San Luis Obispo, California, U.S.
- Website: torylanezstore.com

Daystar Shemuel Shua Peterson (born July 27, 1992), known professionally as Tory Lanez, is a Canadian singer and rapper. Known for his versatility and blending R&B and hip-hop in his music, he was first discovered by Sean Kingston. He came to initial recognition with his mixtape Conflicts of My Soul: The 416 Story, released in August 2013. In 2015, Lanez signed with record producer Benny Blanco's Mad Love Records, an imprint of Interscope Records.

Lanez's debut studio album, I Told You (2016) explored alternative R&B and was commercially successful. Its two lead singles, "Say It" and "Luv", peaked at numbers 23 and 19 on the US Billboard Hot 100, respectively. Both released in 2018, Lanez's second and third albums, Memories Don't Die and Love Me Now? delved further into hip-hop and were met with continued commercial success despite mixed reviews; the former became his first album to peak atop the Canadian Albums Chart, while the latter spawned the double platinum-certified single "Talk to Me" (with Rich the Kid). His fourth album and final major label release, Chixtape 5 (2019) peaked at number two on the US Billboard 200, while his fifth album, Daystar (2020), peaked at number ten. He then released his 1980s-inspired sixth album, Alone at Prom (2021), followed by his seventh, Sorry 4 What (2022) until his incarceration. His eighth album, Peterson (2025), entered the Billboard 200 at number 25.

On August 8, 2023, Lanez was sentenced to ten years in prison after being convicted of shooting Megan Thee Stallion in 2020. He was found guilty of first-degree assault with a firearm, discharge of a firearm with gross negligence, and having a concealed firearm in a vehicle.

== Early life ==
Daystar Shemuel Shua Peterson was born on July 27, 1992, in Brampton, Ontario, to a Bajan father, Sonstar, and a mother from Curaçao, Luella. The family was based in Montreal, before moving to Miami, Florida; Lanez is the youngest of six siblings. At the age of eleven his mother died of anemia; following this, his father began working as an ordained minister and missionary, causing them both to move frequently throughout the United States. Lanez's father later remarried and the family moved to Atlanta, Georgia, where Lanez met his friend Hakeem, who at the time was a janitor. The nickname "Lanez" was given to him by Hakeem, as a comment on Lanez's thrill-seeking tendencies, that sometimes saw him mucking around in the street, not looking for traffic and playing in the lanes.

In 2006, Lanez was sent to live with his cousins in Jamaica, Queens, New York because of his behavior issues. Lanez was then forced to move to Toronto with his grandmother, who subsequently refused to take care of him: "I ended up moving downtown with these three dudes that I didn't really know. I came into the house and I didn't realize how things worked. From like fifteen to eighteen, I was just fighting them. It was every man for himself. That's what made me a man, having to fend for myself and being in a situation where there is no dad, no grandma and no mom to help you. It changed the person that I am today", he says.

Lanez started rapping again, giving himself a nickname, Notorious, which is a reference to the late rapper Notorious B.I.G., whom he idolized, and adopted into his new moniker "Tory Lanez". At the age of 16, Lanez dropped out of the tenth grade, and he would begin performing songs at the outdoor concerts. At the age of 17, Lanez began singing, which he found an interest in. However, he had never received any vocal training.

== Career ==
=== 2009–2015: Career beginnings ===
In 2009, Lanez released his debut mixtape T.L 2 T.O. While living in South Florida, he began directing some of his music videos, and posted them on his YouTube channel. Sean Kingston was interested in Lanez after seeing a video of him freestyling over Lloyd Banks's "Beamer, Benz, or Bentley". In February 2010, Kingston contacted Lanez requesting a meetup while on tour with Justin Bieber, resulting in Lanez performing on the tour. In 2010, Lanez released the mixtapes, Just Landed, One Verse One Hearse, Playing for Keeps and Mr. 1 Verse Killah. In 2011, Lanez signed a record deal with Kingston's Time is Money Entertainment and released a trio of mixtapes: Mr. Peterson, Chixtape, and Swavey. He later left the label to be an independent artist.

In the following three years, he released additional mixtapes: Sincerely Tory (2012), Conflicts of My Soul: The 416 Story (2013), and Chixtape II (2014). In April 2014, Lanez released two episodes of the "Public Swave Announcement", of behind the scenes of the "These Things Happen Tour" with G-Eazy and Rockie Fresh. On June 2, 2014, Lanez released the song, "Teyana", as a tribute to singer Teyana Taylor. Taylor responded with the track, "Dreams of Fuckin' an R&B Bitch". On June 6, 2014, Lanez released "The Godfather", a song to announce that he was going to start a series called, Fargo Fridays, only releasing songs, albums, or videos on Fridays on HotNewHipHop. The songs, "I'll Be There", "Talk On Road", and "Balenciagas" were released later that month.

After releasing a number of songs from the series, he released a song called "The Mission" to celebrate his tour announcement on August 14, 2014. Lanez kicked off his first headlining tour, the "Lost Cause Tour", in conjunction with the mixtape Lost Cause. The mixtape was supposed to be released on September 29, 2014, but got pushed back to October 1. In an interview, Lanez claimed he has ghost-written songs for artists such as Akon ("Been Gettin' Money" with Jeezy), Casey Veggies ("Actin' Up"), August Alsina ("My Niggas" with Meek Mill), as well as T.I. and Travis Scott. On February 27, 2015, Lanez revealed that he was going to release a collaboration EP with the WeDidIt Records producers on April 6.

On April 3, 2015, Lanez released the single titled "In For It" for his upcoming EP. On May 8, 2015, Lanez released another song, titled "Ric Flair" featuring Rory Trustory. On May 22, 2015, he released the second single for the EP, titled "Acting Like". On June 19, 2015, Lanez announced that the EP would be called, Cruel Intentions and released on June 26, 2015. That same day the single "Karrueche" was released.

=== 2015–2020: Album releases and growing popularity ===
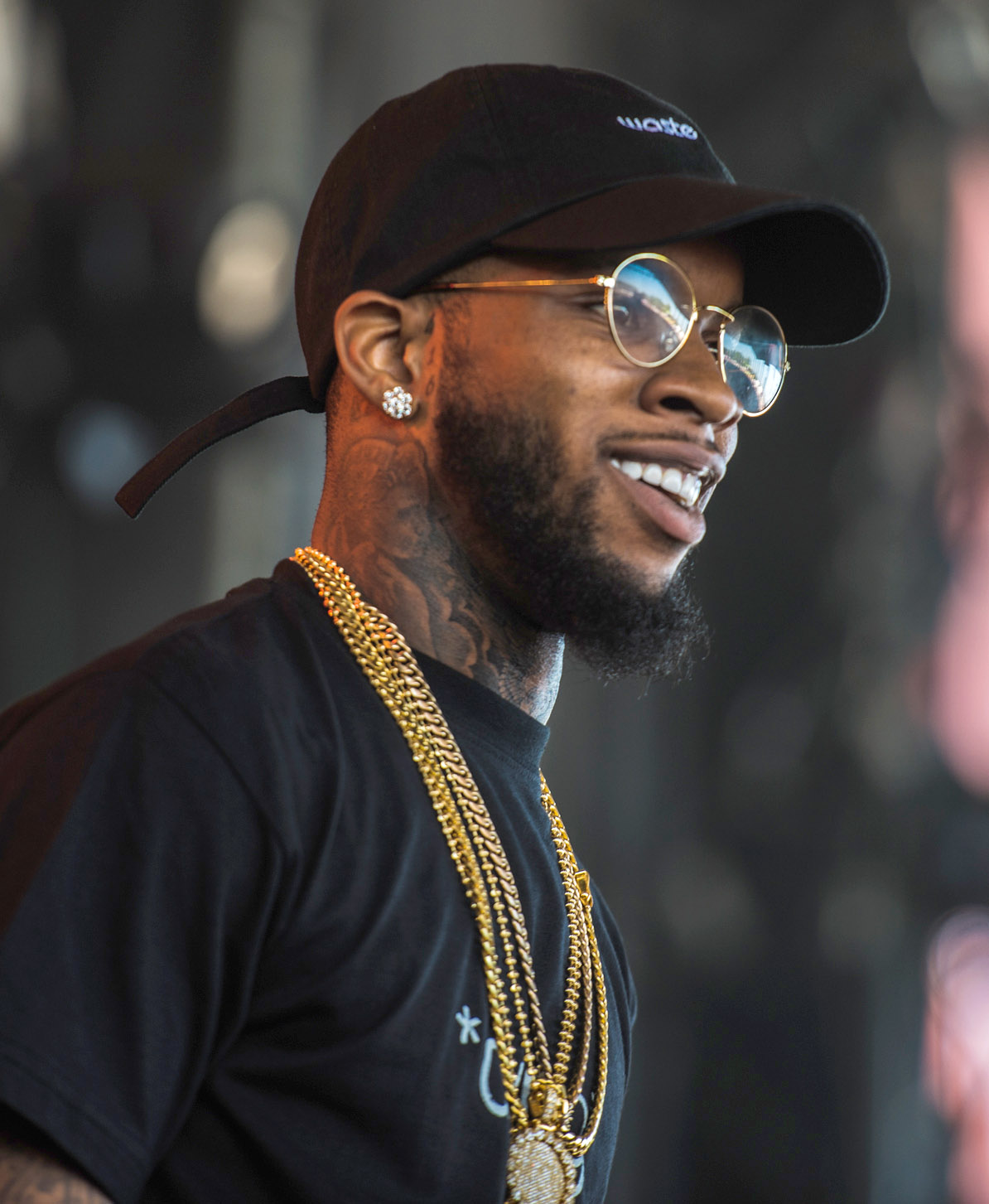
Tory Lanez during a live performance in 2016

On July 15, 2015, Lanez released the first single off his debut album, titled "Say It", and peaked at number 23 on the Billboard Hot 100. It was also revealed that he signed to Benny Blanco's Mad Love Records and Interscope Records. On September 18, 2015, Lanez released the single, "BLOW", which isn't part of the debut album. December 25, 2015, Lanez released the two mixtapes, Chixtape III and The New Toronto. On January 18, 2016, "LA Confidential" was released as the second single for the album. On January 28, 2016, Lanez made a guest appearance on Jimmy Kimmel Live! performing "Say It". He performed the song with the popular 90s R&B group Brownstone, whose hit "If You Love Me" was sampled on 'Say It'. A month later, Lanez released a remix of MadeinTYO's "Uber Everywhere". On March 4, 2016, Lanez released the song, "Tim Duncan" as a part of his Fargo Fridays series. He released the song, "Real Addresses" the next week.

On April 1, 2016, ASAP Ferg and Lanez announced "The Level Up Tour". On April 5, 2016, it was revealed that Lanez would perform at Summer Jam and Pemberton Music Festival in the summer of 2016. On April 8, 2016, Lanez and ASAP Ferg collaborated on the song, "Line Up the Flex" to promote their "Level Up" tour. On April 18, Lanez refused to be on the 2016 XXL Freshmen cover because he felt he was in a higher league musically than the other artists being considered. On May 6, 2016, Lanez released two songs, "For Real" and "Unforgetful" as a part of the Fargo Friday series. On July 29, 2016, Lanez released the official second single "Luv" on iTunes. Luv was Lanez's most popular single to date, as it performed better than Say It, peaking at number 19 on the Billboard Hot 100. He also revealed that his album title would be I Told You.

I Told You was released on August 19, 2016. On July 5, Lanez released two remixes for Drake's "Controlla" and DJ Khaled's "I Got the Keys". On July 20, Lanez announced the I Told You tour to promote the album.

On March 2, 2018, Lanez released his second studio album Memories Don't Die. Within the same year, he also released an album titled Love Me Now? on October 26, 2018, an album titled Chixtape 5 on November 15, 2019. The album includes production from Papi Yerr, who contributed to multiple tracks including "Jerry Sprunger", "Love Sounds", and "The Take".

In 2019, Tory Lanez began complaining about his major label, Interscope Records, publicly threatening the company to "expose what's really going on in that f*****g building!". By February 2020, he announced his departure from Interscope, not publicly stating the reason behind it. He released a hip-hop mixtape titled The New Toronto 3 on April 10, 2020, marking his final release with Interscope Records.

On March 20, 2020, Lanez teamed up with Jamaican dancehall artist Buju Banton for a remix of "Trust". During the quarantine lockdown due to the COVID-19 pandemic, Lanez hosted "Quarantine Radio" on his Instagram Live starting on March 24. "Quarantine Radio" went on to have surprise appearances from Bryson Tiller, Justin Bieber, and Drake which had 310,000 viewers during the rappers appearance. He later set a record for the platform with 360,000 viewers live. On May 14, 2020, Lanez released the single "Temperature Rising", via his own One Umbrella imprint, marking his first release as an independent artist, following his departure from Interscope Records. On July 10, Lanez released three singles, "Simple Things, with DJDS and Rema, "Staccato", and "392", with his label signee VV$ Ken. The latter two tracks was released as an EP called VVS Capsule.

=== 2020–present: Independent albums and incarceration ===
On September 25, 2020, Lanez surprise-released his fifth album, Daystar, his first project since departing Interscope earlier that year. On the album, he defends himself in multiple songs against claims that he shot rapper Megan Thee Stallion in 2020.

The following months he announced the release of "capsules" that would contain separate different types of music from him, then releasing the hip-hop commercial mixtape Loner on December 22, 2020, the R&B commercial mixtape Playboy on March 5, 2021, and his sixth studio album Alone at Prom, on December 10, 2021, which is an 80's inspired synth-pop project. The following year Sorry 4 What marked Lanez's last studio album being released before his 2022 conviction of three felonies in relation to his shooting of Megan Thee Stallion, being later sentenced in 2023 to 10 years in prison.

While incarcerated, Lanez's track "The Color Violet", contained in the Alone at Prom album, experienced a boost in popularity thanks to popular social media app TikTok. In 2023, the singer released the deluxe edition of his 2021 album Alone at Prom, featuring 10 additional tracks, marking his first official release following his incarceration.

Beginning in July 2024, tracks began to release under the Lost Tapes and Prison Tapes monikers, consisting of tracks recorded from 2015 to 2020 and tracks recorded from within prison, respectively. Tracks would be released in pairs, and would release on Fridays, similar to his 'Fargo Fridays' moniker. Towards the end of August 2024, tracks began to release under the Twitch Tapes moniker, consisting of songs recorded live on streaming platform Twitch, and were intended to release as a full project prior to his incarceration. Two of the notable prison tapes, "Wish I Never Met You" and "Know What You Need" peaked at number 33 and number 34 on the Hot R&B/Hip-Hop Songs.

In 2025, he released Peterson, which was recorded entirely while he was in prison and used artificial intelligence technology to enhance the recordings. Lanez described it as the "first ever in-real-time prison album". The album reached number 25 on the US Billboard 200. On May 12, 2025, Lanez was hospitalized after being stabbed in his prison cell by another inmate.

On January 28, 2026, Lanez released an extended play called Slutty Bass from prison. The EP contains two songs called "S.L.I.D.E" and "Planet Bass / NBLYB". He also expressed the EP being a "new genre" mixing miami bass with alternative R&B.

On July 17, 2026, Lanez released his tenth studio album called Made You Think I Was Gone ...But. The album is divided into two discs, with Disc 1, Fargo’s Revenge, focused on rap and Disc 2, Fargo’s Heartbreak, focused on R&B. This marks Lanez's third album released in the previous 12 months.

== Musical style ==
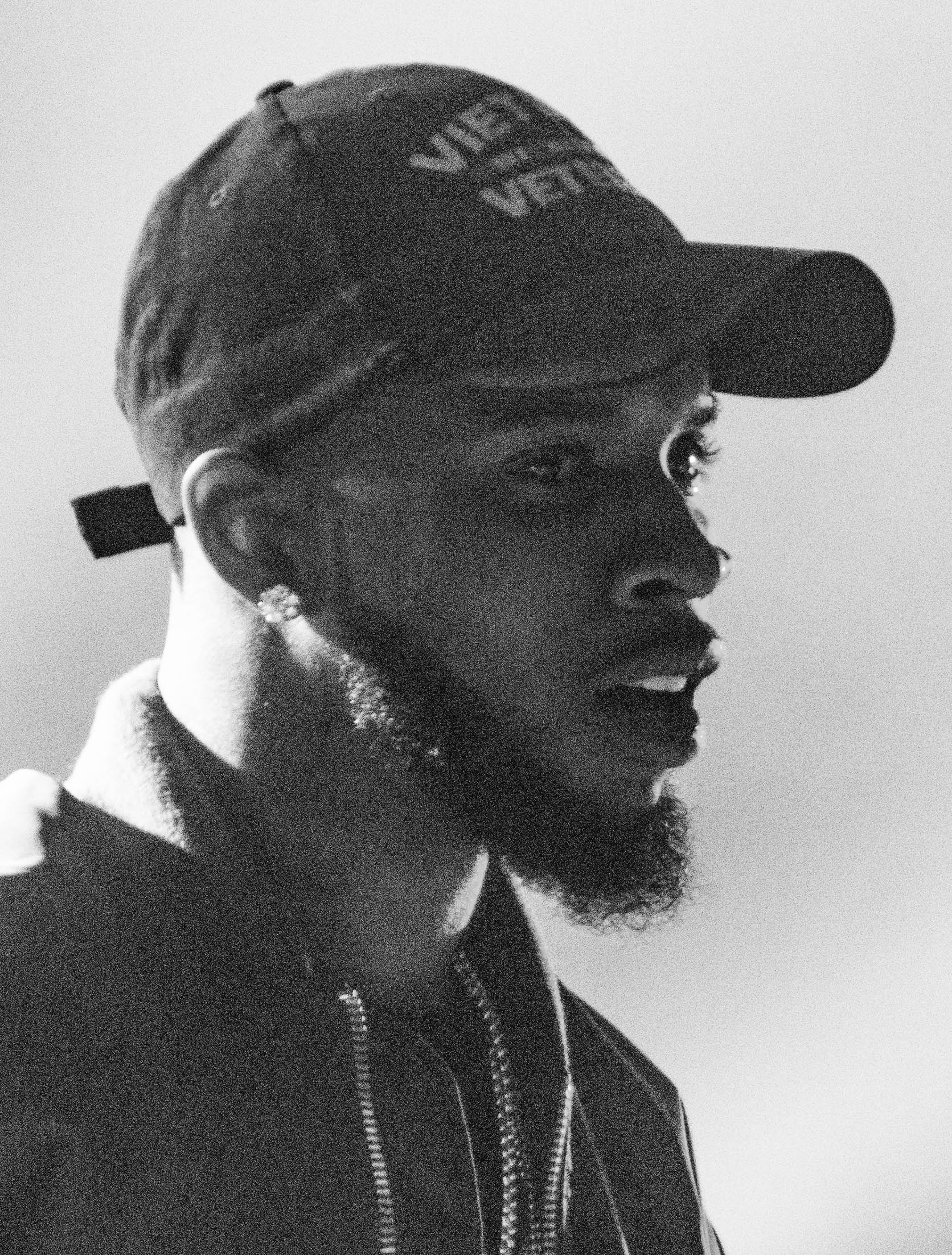
Tory Lanez in 2016

Tory Lanez's music is usually R&B and hip-hop, blending both styles, occasionally on the same song. His vocal performances feature both singing and rapping, with a frequent usage of autotune. In an interview on "Nice Kicks" with Ian Stonebook, Lanez described his own personal style he calls, "Swavey": "Swavey is a two-adjective word. A lot of people use it as an attribute, but the real definition of swavey is a genre of music. The genre of music is the genre of fusing more than one together. I know it sounds strange, but if you ask an artist what they do they're going to say that they rap, they sing, they do rock, a lot of people are multi-talented. They get looked at confused, but I don't think that they're confused. I feel that they're just talented, swavey artists. Labels want to put you in one lane, but I feel like there are so many people are more than that and they're swavey artists."

Among his musical inspirations Lanez mentioned Brandy, Ray J, Chris Brown and Lil Wayne.

=== One Umbrella ===
One Umbrella is a Canadian record label and management company founded by Lanez in 2014. It began as a clothing company under the subsidiary Forever Umbrella. The label's first signee was Mansa in 2018, and expanded to sign artists Mariah the Scientist, and Kaash Paige. In 2020, Lanez released his first single as an independent artist, writing "I waited and calculated for 4 years to be my own boss. I own all my own masters, publishing, royalties etc. This may not mean nothing to y'all but seeing my record label at the bottom unattached to a major label is what we have worked this hard for".

== Feuds ==
=== Drake ===
In 2010, a video of Lanez freestyling with a title suggesting he was Canadian rapper Drake's younger brother was posted to YouTube. Lanez posted a video in response where he denied relation to Drake and challenged the rapper to listen to his second mixtape Playing for Keeps. Lanez offered to give Drake $10,000 if he did not like it. In 2015, Lanez mocked Drake during a radio freestyle and expressed his dislike of the use of "the 6", a nickname for Toronto that had been popularized by Drake. Drake dissed Lanez in lines from his 2016 single "Summer Sixteen". Responding to the diss in an interview with Revolt, Lanez called himself a fan of Drake and said he wasn't planning on responding, "Drake could diss me 20,000 times, and I'd never diss him. I'm a fan... I have no negativity on my side. All blessings to that man." Across 2016 and 2017 the artists exchanged disses, with Lanez insulting Drake in his songs "Drive You Crazy", "For Real", and his remix to "Uber Everywhere", while Drake insulted him on "Still Here", "Do Not Disturb", and in altered lyrics in the live version of "Summer Sixteen". On May 19, 2017, Lanez and Drake ended their beef, posting pictures of each other on Instagram.

=== Joyner Lucas and Don Q ===
In November 2018, during an Instagram Live session, Lanez claimed that he's a better rapper than American rapper Joyner Lucas. In response, Lucas challenged Lanez to a rap battle, which led to several diss records being released between the two, including the "Lucky You Freestyle" and the "Zeze Freestyle". Although the beef was short-lived, Lanez expressed distaste at those who sided with Lucas. Shortly after his beef with Joyner Lucas ensued, New York rapper Don Q dropped a battle track titled "I'm Not Joyner", alleging that Lanez was stealing Q's lyrics. Lanez fired back with a track called "Dom Queen", before Q responded with another diss track. In response to the feuds, Karlton Jahmal of HotNewHipHop praised Lanez, saying, "the art of the competitive, lyrical battle rap has been missing from the mainstream wave for years".

=== August Alsina ===
In 2022, August Alsina and Lanez met backstage at Rip Micheals's "Fall Back in Love Comedy & Music Jam tour" in Chicago on September 17, where Alsina claimed Lanez punched him. Alsina claimed the "sneak attack" left him with numerous injuries, which he then documented on his Instagram account. One photo shows a gash on his lip while others show cuts and grazes on his elbow and knee. Lanez denied the accusations.

== Personal life ==
Lanez has a son.

Lanez also goes by the name Argentina Fargo. In an interview, he said "When I put foreign and banking together, it's like foreign money. I'm a Canadian dude, walking around America. When you look at me, it's like looking at foreign money. So I call myself Argentina Fargo—like foreign money."

Lanez's wife, Raina Chassagne, filed for divorce in June 2024, citing irreconcilable differences. The couple married on June 25, 2023. She asked for legal and physical custody for their son.

In August 2024, in a phone call with Adin Ross, Lanez revealed that he had graduated from high school and enrolled himself into college.

== Legal issues ==
=== 2016 riot ===
On March 26, 2016, during a concert in Midland, Texas, violent scuffles between security forces and concertgoers occurred. Lanez then proceeded to tell the crowd to "fuck shit up," which incited a riot and forced police to shut down the show. Multiple people were arrested. The venue and concert promoters considered legal actions against Lanez.

=== Shooting of Megan Thee Stallion ===
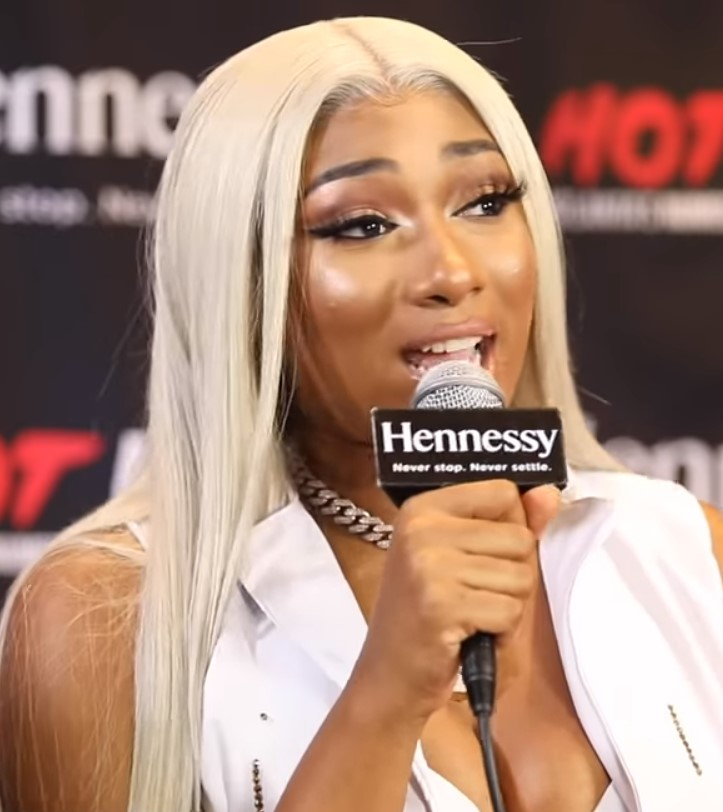
Megan Thee Stallion, who was shot by Lanez with a firearm, pictured in 2019

On July 12, 2020, after leaving a house party where there had been an argument that resulted in violence, Lanez was arrested in the Hollywood Hills and charged with carrying a concealed weapon in his vehicle. Another rap artist, Megan Thee Stallion, was also in the car, and was initially reported to have had a foot wound caused by glass. However, in an Instagram post, Megan later disputed this, stating she underwent surgery after suffering "gunshot wounds, as a result of a crime that was committed against me and done with the intention to physically harm me". At the time, she did not state who shot her. On Instagram Live in August 2020, Megan stated that she was shot by Lanez during this incident. She also voiced her opinions against his publicity team, saying: "You shot me, and you got your publicist and your people going to these blogs lyin' and shit. Stop lyin'. Why lie?"

On September 25, 2020, Lanez released his fifth album, Daystar, in which he denies shooting Megan, while also claiming she and her team were "trying to frame" him; on the song "Money Over Fallouts", he raps: "how you get shot in your foot, don't hit no bones or tendons?" The same day, in a statement to Variety, Megan's attorney, Alex Spiro, claimed Lanez's representatives had since attempted to launch a "smear campaign" against Megan to discredit her allegations. Spiro stated: "We have been made aware of manipulated text messages and invented email accounts that have been disseminated to the media in a calculated attempt to peddle a false narrative about the events that occurred". Lanez's team denied responsibility for the fake emails. On September 29, 2020, Lanez claimed on Instagram that news sites had launched a smear campaign against him.

In October 2020, Lanez was officially charged with felony counts of assault with a semiautomatic firearm, personal use of a firearm, and carrying a loaded, unregistered firearm in a vehicle. He also faced an allegation that he personally inflicted great bodily injury with a gun. Lanez's arraignment was scheduled for October 13, but was delayed to November 18 after his attorney requested a continuance. A protective order was later issued against Lanez, ordering him to stay at least 100 yards away from Megan and not contact her. He was also ordered to surrender any guns he owned.

In an op-ed for The New York Times, published on October 13, 2020, Megan addressed the shooting further, writing: "Black women are still constantly disrespected and disregarded in so many areas of life. I was recently the victim of an act of violence by a man. After a party, I was shot twice as I walked away from him. We were not in a relationship. Truthfully, I was shocked that I ended up in that place". In April 2022, Lanez was arrested for violating a protection order relating to the case. He was released shortly after on an increased bond of $350,000.

On December 23, 2022, Lanez was convicted in a jury trial on three felony charges in respect to the shooting: assault with a semiautomatic handgun, having a loaded and unregistered firearm in a vehicle, and gross negligence in discharging his firearm. Lanez, who was tried in Los Angeles, was taken to jail immediately following the conviction. On August 8, 2023, he was sentenced to 10 years in prison for the shooting. On October 25, 2024, a California appeals court "issued a procedural order acknowledging that it had received a new petition from Lanez’s legal team and would consider it alongside his other appeals." On May 12, 2025, Lanez was attacked at a housing unit at the California Correctional Institution in Tehachapi and sustained 14 stab wounds. On May 22, 2025, he was transferred to the California Men's Colony for safety reasons following the stabbing incident.

== Discography ==
- I Told You (2016)
- Memories Don't Die (2018)
- Love Me Now? (2018)
- Chixtape 5 (2019)
- Daystar (2020)
- Alone at Prom (2021)
- Sorry 4 What (2022)
- Peterson (2025)
- LOL: Slutty Bass (2026)
- Made You Think I Was Gone ...But (2026)

== Awards and nominations ==
Year	Awards	Category	Nominated work	Result
2015	Much Music Video Awards	Best Hip Hop Video	"Henny in Hand"	Nominated
2016	BET Awards	Best New Artist	Himself	Nominated
2016	BET Hip Hop Awards	Best New Hip Hop Artist	Himself	Nominated
2016	MOBO Awards	Best International Act	Himself	Nominated
2016	Soul Train Music Awards	Best New Artist	Himself	Nominated
2017	Grammy Awards	Best R&B Song	"Luv"	Nominated
2017	Juno Awards	Fan Choice Award	Himself	Nominated
2017	Juno Awards	Breakthrough Artist of the Year	Himself	Nominated
2017	Juno Awards	Rap Recording of the Year	"Shooters"	Won
2019	NAACP Image Awards	Best New Artist	Himself	Nominated
2019	Juno Awards	Fan Choice Award	Himself	Nominated
2019	Juno Awards	Artist of the Year	Himself	Nominated
2019	Juno Awards	Rap Recording	Love Me Now?	Won
2019	BET Hip Hop Awards	Best International Flow	Himself	Nominated
2019	Juno Awards	Fan Choice Award	Himself	Nominated
2019	Juno Awards	Artist of the Year	Himself	Nominated
2019	Juno Awards	Rap Recording	Freaky	Won
2020	Juno Awards	Juno Award for R&B/Soul Recording of the Year	Chixtape 5	Nominated
2020	Juno Awards	Juno Award for R&B/Soul Recording of the Year	Feel It Too	Won
