= Chixtape III =

Mixtape by Tory Lanez
- Released: December 25, 2015
- Recorded: 2015
- Genres: PBR&B; Hip hop
- Length: 36:09
- Producers: Tory Lanez; Play Picasso; Sergio Romero; Happy Perez; Lavi$h

Tory Lanez chronology
Cruel Intentions (2015)	Chixtape III (2015)	The New Toronto (2015)

Chixtape III is a mixtape by Canadian rapper Tory Lanez; it was released on December 25, 2015. It is the sequel to Chixtape II released in March 2014. The album includes a guest appearance from Ed Sheeran and production from Play Picasso, Happy Perez, Lavi$h, Sergio Romero and Lanez himself. The mixtape was added to streaming services on December 26, 2025 along with Chixtape II and Chixtape IV.

== Release and promotion ==
On December 22, 2015, Tory Lanez announced was going to release two mixtapes on Christmas, Chixtape III and The New Toronto. He also revealed the album covers that day.

== Track listing ==
No.	Title	Producer(s)	Length
1.	"Keisha's Intro (Skit)"		0:46
2.	"Came 4 Me"	Tory Lanez; Play Picasso	2:00
3.	"N.A.M.E."	Tory Lanez; Play Picasso; Happy Perez	4:50
4.	"Jalissa's Friends Pt. 2 (Skit)"		1:05
5.	"Looks"	Lavi$h	4:53
6.	"Juvenile (Freestyle)"	Tory Lanez; Play Picasso	2:47
7.	"Niggas Talk (Skit)"		1:09
8.	"S M N"	Tory Lanez; Play Picasso	3:50
9.	"You Got it Worse..."	Play Picasso; Tory Lanez	4:23
10.	"Walked Out"	Tory Lanez; Play Picasso	2:11
11.	"Save It" (featuring Ed Sheeran)	Play Picasso; Sergio Romero	7:04
12.	"Keisha"	Tory Lanez	2:16

- Notes:
- "Looks" as a sample of "Disrespectful" by Trey Songz feat. Mila J
