= Cruel Intentions (EP) =

EP by Tory Lanez and WeDidIt Records
- Released: June 26, 2015
- Recorded: 2015
- Studios: WeDidIt Studios, Los Angeles, California
- Genres: Alternative R&B; electronic; cloud rap
- Length: 20:33
- Label: WeDidIt
- Producers: Baauer; RL Grime; D33J; Shlohmo; Play Picasso

Tory Lanez chronology
Lost Cause (2014)	Cruel Intentions (2015)	Chixtape III (2015)

WeDidIt Records chronology
Cruel Intentions (2015)

Singles from Cruel Intentions
- 1. "In For It" Released: April 3, 2015; 2. "Acting Like" Released: May 22, 2015

Cruel Intentions is the debut extended play (EP) by Canadian singer and rapper Tory Lanez and electronic music label WeDidIt Records; It was released on June 26, 2015. All producers on the album are on the label except Play Picasso, who is signed to Tory Lanez's independent record label, One Umbrella. Lanez collaborated with RL Grime, Baauer, D33J and Shlohmo who are artists signed to WeDidIt Records. The album was supported by two singles, "In For It" and "Acting Like".

== Singles ==
On April 3, 2015, the first promotional single, titled "In For It", was released. According to the cover art the song was recorded in Los Angeles. On May 22, 2015, the second promotional single, titled "Acting Like", was released. The music video was released on the same day.

== Track listing ==
No.	Title	Writer(s)	Producer(s)	Length
1.	"Acting Like"	Daystar Peterson; Henry Laufer	Shlohmo	4:25
2.	"In For It"	Peterson; Henry Steinway	RL Grime	4:54
3.	"N.I.N.A."	Peterson; Harry Rodrigues	Baauer	3:14
4.	"Fallback"	Peterson; Daniel Gonzalez	Play Picasso	3:11
5.	"Honda Civic"	Peterson; Djavan Santos	D33J	4:49
Total length:				19:53
