= The Color Violet =

Song by Tory Lanez

from the album Alone at Prom
- Released: December 10, 2021
- Genre: R&B
- Length: 3:46
- Label: One Umbrella
- Songwriters: Dejan Nikolic; Daystar Peterson; Michael Hernandez
- Producers: Nikolic; Foreign Teck

Music video
- "The Color Violet" on YouTube

"The Color Violet" is a song by Canadian singer Tory Lanez. It is the fourth track on his sixth studio album Alone at Prom, released on December 10, 2021, through One Umbrella. The song was written by Lanez, Dejan Nikolić and Michael Hernandez, and produced by Nik Dean, Foreign Teck and Kendall Roark Bailey.

"The Color Violet" became a sleeper hit after gaining popularity on TikTok more than a year after its release. It subsequently entered charts in several countries, including the Billboard Hot 100, where it peaked at number 63, and the Canadian Hot 100, where it reached number 24.

== Composition ==
HotNewHipHop described "The Color Violet" as "a late-night cruising anthem that was a part of the 80s transformation that we saw seem to dip into on the record".

== Music video ==
The official music video for the song was released on November 6, 2023, while Lanez was in jail.

== Commercial performance ==
After becoming popular on TikTok, "The Color Violet" experienced a significant increase in streaming activity more than a year after its release. It debuted on the UK Singles Chart in November 2022 and subsequently reached number 36. The song peaked at number 63 on the Billboard Hot 100 and number 24 on the Canadian Hot 100.

The song also reached the top 40 in Australia, Ireland, Lithuania, New Zealand and Norway, and reached number 2 on the Dutch Single Tip chart.

== Charts ==
=== Weekly charts ===
Chart performance for "The Color Violet"
Chart (2022–2023)	Peak position
Australia (ARIA)	39
Canada Hot 100 (Billboard)	24
Global 200 (Billboard)	85
Ireland (IRMA)	22
Lebanon (Lebanese Top 20)	13
Lithuania (AGATA)	23
Netherlands (Single Tip)	2
New Zealand Hot Singles (RMNZ)	13
Norway (VG-lista)	37
Sweden Heatseeker (Sverigetopplistan)	2
Switzerland (Schweizer Hitparade)	99
UK Singles (Official Charts)	36
UK Indie (Official Charts)	5
UK Hip Hop/R&B (Official Charts)	16
US Billboard Hot 100	63
US Hot R&B/Hip-Hop Songs (Billboard)	22

=== Year-end charts ===
2023 year-end chart performance for "The Color Violet"
Chart (2023)	Position
Australia (ARIA)	64
Canada (Canadian Hot 100)	90
US Hot R&B/Hip-Hop Songs (Billboard)	76

2024 year-end chart performance for "The Color Violet"
Chart (2024)	Position
Australia Hip Hop/R&B (ARIA)	35

== Certifications ==
Certifications for "The Color Violet"
Region	Certification	Certified units/sales
Denmark (IFPI Danmark)	Gold	45,000^{‡}
New Zealand (RMNZ)	Platinum	30,000^{‡}
Spain (Promusicae)	Gold	50,000^{‡}
United Kingdom (BPI)	Platinum	600,000^{‡}
United States (RIAA)	4× Platinum	4,000,000^{‡}
Streaming
Greece (IFPI Greece)	4× Platinum	8,000,000^{†}
^{‡} Sales+streaming figures based on certification alone.^{†} Streaming-only figures based on certification alone.
