= Lost Cause (Tory Lanez mixtape) =

Mixtape by Tory Lanez
- Released: October 1, 2014
- Recorded: 2014
- Genre: Hip hop; PBR&B
- Length: 47:23
- Label: One Umbrella
- Producer: Tory Lanez; Burd & Keyz; Christian Louie; Daniel Worthy; Grave Goods; Matti Free; Noah Beresin; Play Picasso; RL Grime; Ryan Hemsworth; Syk Sense

Tory Lanez chronology
Chixtape II (2014)	Lost Cause (2014)	Cruel Intentions (2015)

Singles from Lost Cause
- 1. "The Mission" Released: August 14, 2014; 2. "Henny in Hand" Released: September 12, 2014; 3. "Mama Told Me" Released: September 19, 2014; 4. "I-95" Released: September 26, 2014

Lost Cause is the twelfth mixtape by Canadian rapper and singer Tory Lanez, released independently for digital download on October 1, 2014. The mixtape features no guest appearances, while production was handled by Lanez himself alongside Burd & Keyz, Christian Louie, Daniel Worthy, Grave Goods, Matti Free, Noah Beresin, Play Picasso, RL Grime, Ryan Hemsworth, and Syk Sense. The mixtape serves as a follow-up to Lanez's eleventh, Chixtape II (2014).

Lost Cause received generally positive reception from fans and is considered a cult classic. The mixtape was preceded by four singles: "The Mission", "Henny in Hand", "Mama Told Me", and "I-95". For its tenth anniversary, on October 4, 2024, the mixtape was released through Lanez's independent record label, One Umbrella on streaming media, featuring remastered instrumentals while some tracks became longer than their original versions.

== Release and promotion ==
After releasing his Fargo Fridays series Tory started to prepare for his mixtape. On August 14, 2014, he released the first single to the mixtape, "The Mission", to celebrate the announcement of his tour that was taking place in Houston, Los Angeles, New York, Toronto, Burlington, Dallas, and Atlanta. Each week following the announcement of his tour, Lanez began to release the final three singles from the mixtape, "Henny in Hand", "Mama Told Me", and "I-95". The mixtape was delayed for two days and was originally supposed to be released on September 29, 2014. To hold fans over has released a music video for, "The Godfather", which was released earlier that year on June 6. On November 10, he released the music video for the mixtape's tenth cut, "The Mission". In February 2015, the music video for "Henny in Hand", was released.

While incarcerated, on July 24, 2024, Lanez announced his Free Tory playlist which would consist of weekly drops which were recorded by Lanez in prison. However, on September 10, it was announced that Lanez's recording equipment was seized by the prison guards and that the weekly series would be discontinued until further notice. On October 1, Lanez's management had taken to his Instagram to announce the re-release of Lost Cause for October 4, while sharing a message from Lanez giving props to Trina who he claimed helped him kickstart his career at the time of the mixtape's original release:

This is truly a remarkable moment. You should not be an Umbrella without knowing what this project means. Ten years ago, I was broke as fuck sleeping in my girlfriend’s car and on my manager’s couch trying to create a sound that was unique to myself. I LITERALLY put my blood, sweat, and tears into this project. My girlfriend broke up with me and I moved in with @trinarockstarr. I remember showing her the song for ‘Godfather’. She looked at me and said, “That’s the song that’s going to get you a deal.” She put five bands up and helped me get the video shot. Coincidentally, the same director from that video, shot another video from the project for free. That video ended up being ‘Henny in Hand’. Two months later, Interscope watched both videos and couldn’t believe it was the same person on both songs. That led to me getting signed and the rest was history. The unique sound that I was working on ended up being the infamous deep voice Fargo sound that created gems like ‘Litty Again’ and the New Toronto Series. Without this project, I wouldn’t be the Tory Lanez that you know me as. For the 10 year anniversary, not only will I release Lost Cause on DSPS this Friday, but this will be the first of many classic mixtapes of mine that I will officially release on DSPs now that I am INDEPENDENT!!!☂️

== Track listing ==
No.	Title	Writer(s)	Producer(s)	Length
1.	"Grandma's Crib"	Daystar Peterson; Daniel Gonzalez	Tory Lanez; Play Picasso	2:10
2.	"Mama Told Me"	Peterson; Gonzalez; Ryan Hemsworth	Tory Lanez; Play Picasso; Ryan Hemsworth	5:51
3.	"Dry Your I's"	Peterson	Tory Lanez	1:30
4.	"A Week Straight"	Peterson; Noah Beresin	Tory Lanez; Noah Beresin	3:10
5.	"Gold"	Peterson; Gonzalez; Beresin	Tory Lanez; Play Picasso; Noah Beresin	3:33
6.	"With It / We Did It"	Peterson; Gonzalez	Tory Lanez; Play Picasso	5:53
7.	"Selfish / York University"	Peterson; Gonzalez; Joshua Scruggs	Tory Lanez; Play Picasso; Syk Sense	6:13
8.	"I-95"	Peterson; Beresin; Henry Steinway; Grave Goods	Tory Lanez; Noah Beresin; RL Grime; Grave Goods	3:05
9.	"Priceless"	Peterson; Andrew Liburd; Anthony James; Daniel Worthy	Tory Lanez; Burd & Keyz; Daniel Worthy	4:38
10.	"The Mission"	Peterson; Beresin; Christian Louie	Tory Lanez; Noah Beresin; Christian Louie	4:12
11.	"Henny in Hand"	Peterson; Beresin; Matti Beresin	Noah Beresin; Matti Free	3:27
12.	"The Godfather"	Peterson; Gonzalez	Tory Lanez; Play Picasso	5:03
Total length:				47:23

Sample credits

- "The Godfather" contains samples of "Main Title", written and performed by Nino Rota.

== Release history ==
Release dates and formats for Lost Cause
Region	Date	Label(s)	Format(s)	Edition(s)	Ref.
Various	October 1, 2014	Self-released	Digital download	Standard	
Various	October 4, 2024	One Umbrella	Streaming	Standard	
