= The New Toronto 3 =

Mixtape by Tory Lanez
- Released: April 10, 2020
- Genres: Hip-hop; trap
- Length: 44:14
- Label: Interscope
- Producers: DZL; 9three; Ambiene; B&N; C-Sick; C.P Dubb; Cassius Jay; Cherry Beats; Coop the Truth; SLAUTED; Don Cannon; Elyas; Foreign Teck; HAYES; Kyle Coleman; Mansa; Papi Yerr; Play Picasso; Ron Sizzle; Sergio R.; Supah Mario; T. Borja; Tory Lanez

Tory Lanez chronology
Chixtape 5 (2019)	The New Toronto 3 (2020)	Daystar (2020)

Singles from The New Toronto 3
- 1. "Broke in a Minute" Released: February 7, 2020; 2. "Do the Most" Released: March 27, 2020; 3. "Who Needs Love" Released: April 3, 2020

The New Toronto 3 is a commercial mixtape by Canadian singer and rapper Tory Lanez. It was released on April 10, 2020 by Interscope Records with 16 tracks. It serves as his final release with Interscope, and the third installment in the New Toronto series. The New Toronto 3 follows four months after Lanez's prior release Chixtape 5, released as an album in a series of mixtapes. The production on the mixtape was handled by multiple producers including Foreign Teck, Play Picasso, Supah Mario, Cassius Jay, Don Cannon and C-Sick among others. The mixtape also features guest appearances by Mansa and Lil Tjay.

The New Toronto 3 was supported by three singles: "Broke in a Minute", "Do the Most" and "Who Needs Love". The mixtape received positive reviews from music critics and was a commercial success. It debuted at number two on the US Billboard 200 chart, earning 64,000 album-equivalent units in its first week.

== Background ==
The New Toronto 3 is the final release of Lanez's five-album contract with Interscope Records. The project was intended to be released in March 2020, but was delayed due to Lanez's label issues, which he has aired through social media, writing on Instagram that he has had to "dumb down [his] creativity" and that his prior release, Chixtape 5, was the "closest thing [he's] been able to give [...] that had somewhat of the quality" he intends his future music to have.

== Singles ==
The New Toronto 3 was supported by three singles. On February 8, 2020, he released the lead single from the mixtape, "Broke in a Minute" along with a music video. After the mixtape's release, the single debuted at number 64 on the US Billboard Hot 100. The single also peaked at number 76 on the Canadian Hot 100. On March 27, 2020, "Do the Most" was released as the mixtape's second single. The music video was released on March 31, 2020. The single missed the Hot 100 but managed to peak at number six on the US Bubbling Under the Hot 100 chart. It also peaked at number 83 on the Canadian Hot 100. On April 2, 2020, "Who Needs Love" was released as the mixtape's final single. The music video was released on April 14, 2020. The single peaked at number one on the US Bubbling Under the Hot 100 chart. The single also peaked at number 57 on the Canadian Hot 100 and number 58 on the UK Singles Chart respectively.

=== Promotional singles ===
The first promotional single, "K lo K" was released on January 30, 2020. The features a guest appearance by Fivio Foreign. The music video was released online a day later. The single failed to chart on the Hot 100 but peaked at number 86 on the Canadian Hot 100. The second promotional single, "W" was released on March 23, 2020 accompany with a music video.

=== Other songs ===
After the mixtape's release, "Stupid Again" debuted at number 54 on the Billboard Hot 100 chart dated April 25, 2020. The song also peaked at number 80 on the Canadian Hot 100 and number 66 on the UK Singles Chart. "The Coldest Playboy" and "10 F*CKS" both also debuted at number 12 and number 15 on the Bubbling Under the Hot 100 chart.

== Critical reception ==
Professional ratings
Aggregate scores
Source	Rating
Metacritic	79/100
Review scores
Source	Rating
Clash	7/10
Exclaim!	8/10
NME	4/5 stars

The New Toronto 3 was met with generally positive reviews. At Metacritic, which assigns a normalized rating out of 100 to reviews from professional publications, the album received an average score of 79, based on four reviews.

Jordan Bassett of NME gave the album four stars. Bassett praised Lanez' growth as an artist stating "In a lot of ways, Tory Lanez feels like something of an old-school hip-hop star. In recent years, a generation of young rappers transcended SoundCloud to become true icons, sharing bracing admissions about mental health and drug use (many also doomed, from Lil Peep to Juice WRLD)." He also stated that "Lanez is a more complex artist [than] many give him credit for."

== Commercial performance ==
In his home country of Canada, The New Toronto 3 debuted at number one on the Canadian Albums Chart, earning a total number of 10 million on-demand streams in its first week. This became his second number-one debut in the country. In the United States, The New Toronto 3 debuted at number two on the US Billboard 200 with 64,000 album-equivalent units (including 5,000 copies in pure album sales) in its first week. It is Lanez' fifth US top-five album on that chart. The mixtape also accumulated a total of 76.1 million on-demand streams from its songs that week. In its second week, the mixtape dropped to number ten on the chart, earning an additional 28,000 units.

== Track listing ==
The New Toronto 3 track listing
No.	Title	Writer(s)	Producer(s)	Length
1.	"Pricey & Spicy"	Daystar Peterson; Daniel Gonzalez	Play Picasso; Tory Lanez	2:31
2.	"The Coldest Playboy"	Peterson; Isom Green III; Gonzalez	9three; Play Picasso; Lanez	2:00
3.	"Stupid Again"	Peterson; Jonathan Priester	Supah Mario; Nik Dean	2:54
4.	"10 Fucks" (with Mansa)	Peterson; Mansa Evans; Ben Unfug; Sterling Purdy; Gonzalez	B&N; HAYES; Mansa; Play Picasso; Lanez	2:49
5.	"Dope Boy's Diary"	Peterson; Donald Cannon	Don Cannon; Sean Momberger	3:04
6.	"Accidents Happen" (with Lil Tjay)	Peterson; Tione Merritt; Charles Dumazer; Gonzalez	C-Sick; Play Picasso; Lanez	3:24
7.	"Broke in a Minute"	Peterson; Anthony Woart Jr.	Papi Yerr	2:12
8.	"P.A.I.N"	Peterson; Barrington Wright; Sarah J.; Joshua Cross; Gonzalez; Thorstein Borja	Cassius Jay; Play Picasso; T. Borja; Lanez	4:14
9.	"Adidas"	Peterson; Cooper McGill; Purdy; Gonzalez	Coop the Truth; HAYES; Play Picasso; Lanez	3:25
10.	"Who Needs Love"	Peterson; Wright; J.; Alvin Santamaria; Keonbin Lee; Gonzalez	Ambience; Cherry Beats; Play Picasso	2:53
11.	"Do the Most"	Peterson; Christopher Washington; Ronald Smith	C.P Dubb; Ron Sizzle; SLAUTED	2:24
12.	"Penthouse Red"	Peterson; Kyle Coleman; Gonzalez; Sergio Romero	Kyle Coleman; Play Picasso; Sergio R.	2:55
13.	"Letter to the City 2"	Peterson; Charles Dumazer	C-Sick	3:16
14.	"Back in Business"	Peterson; Gonzalez	Play Picasso; Lanez	2:13
15.	"D.N.D."	Peterson; Michael Hernandez	DZL; Foreign Teck; The Rascals	1:51
16.	"Msg 4 God's Children"	Peterson; Elias Sticken; Hernandez	Elyas; Foreign Teck	2:00
Total length:				44:14

== Charts ==
=== Weekly charts ===
Chart performance for The New Toronto 3
Chart (2020)	Peak position
Australian Albums (ARIA)	10
Austrian Albums (Ö3 Austria)	29
Belgian Albums (Ultratop Flanders)	22
Belgian Albums (Ultratop Wallonia)	52
Canadian Albums (Billboard)	1
Danish Albums (Hitlisten)	40
Dutch Albums (Album Top 100)	16
French Albums (SNEP)	40
German Albums (Offizielle Top 100)	57
Irish Albums (Official Charts)	31
Italian Albums (FIMI)	74
New Zealand Albums (RMNZ)	23
Norwegian Albums (VG-lista)	15
Swiss Albums (Schweizer Hitparade)	15
UK Albums (Official Charts)	4
US Billboard 200	2
US Top R&B/Hip-Hop Albums (Billboard)	2

=== Year-end charts ===
2020 year-end chart performance for The New Toronto 3
Chart (2020)	Position
US Billboard 200	182
US Top R&B/Hip-Hop Albums (Billboard)	78
