= Roselilah =

- Born: Roshwita Larisha Bacha; July 10, 1996 (age 30); Utrecht, Netherlands
- Genres: Hip hop, trap
- Occupations: Music producer, songwriter
- Years active: 2013–present
- Label: BMG

Roshwita Larisha Bacha (born July 10, 1996), known professionally as Roselilah, is a Dutch hip hop and trap music producer from Utrecht. She is the first Dutch female music producer to win a Grammy Award, notably for co-producing "Luther" by Kendrick Lamar featuring SZA, which won Record of the Year.

== Career ==
Bacha began producing beats at the age of 12, initially focusing on club music before transitioning to hip hop and trap. She started selling her beats on SoundCloud in 2013.

Her work gained attention from Dutch artists such as Frenna (for whom she produced "Babylon"), Adje, Sevn Alias, Cho, and others. In 2016, she signed with the American label BMG.

She has produced for international artists including 21 Savage ("4L" on I Am > I Was), Lil Durk, and GloRilla. Her breakthrough came with the trumpet sample in "Family Ties" by Baby Keem featuring Kendrick Lamar, which won Best Rap Performance at the 2022 Grammy Awards.

In 2024–2025, she contributed to Kendrick Lamar's album GNX, most notably on "Luther" featuring SZA. The song spent 13 weeks at No. 1 on the Billboard Hot 100 and won multiple Grammys at the 2026 ceremony, including Record of the Year.

== Awards and nominations ==
- **Grammy Awards**:
  - Record of the Year – "Luther" (Kendrick Lamar ft. SZA, 2026) – Winner
  - Best Rap Song – "Family Ties" (Baby Keem ft. Kendrick Lamar, 2022) – nomination (as co-producer)
  - Additional nominations for Song of the Year and other categories.
