= Alone at Prom =

Studio album by Tory Lanez
- Released: December 10, 2021
- Recorded: 2020–2021
- Genre: Synth-pop
- Length: 35:54; 70:21 (Deluxe edition)
- Labels: One Umbrella; Create
- Producers: Chaz Jackson; Orlando tha Great; SSJ Mike; Bizness Boi; boyband; Foreign Teck; Tropics; Fortune; Roark Bailey; Nik Dean; Vikaden; Marcus Andersson; Blake Straus

Tory Lanez chronology
| Playboy (2021) | Alone at Prom (2021) | Sorry 4 What (2022) |

Singles from Alone at Prom
- 1. "Lady of Namek" Released: November 15, 2021; 2. "'87 Stingray" Released: December 2, 2021; 3. "Enchanted Waterfall" Released: December 18, 2021

Singles from Alone at Prom (Deluxe)
- 1. "Hurts Me" Released: June 27, 2023

Alone at Prom is the sixth album by the Canadian singer Tory Lanez. It was released on December 10, 2021, through his independent label One Umbrella. The album's concept is inspired by music from the 1980s. The album was supported by four singles: "Lady of Namek", "'87 Stingray", "Enchanted Waterfall", and "Hurts Me". The album's fourth track, "The Color Violet", became a sleeper hit after going viral on TikTok, peaking at 63 on the U.S. Billboard Hot 100.

On November 17, 2023, the deluxe edition of the album was released, featuring ten additional tracks. Following the deluxe's release, Alone at Prom peaked at number 28 on the Billboard 200, marking its peak on the chart.

== Background ==
The album was first announced through the singer’s Instagram account when he revealed that he was working on an "80s capsule" in late 2020, sharing snippets of the project during the last months of 2020 and throughout 2021. Alone at Prom was officially announced, along with its title, in September 2021. Lanez cited as musical inspirations for the project artists such as Hall & Oates, Toto, Michael Jackson and Rick James.

The project was visually accompanied by the creation of an alter ego named Ashton Rain. The singer explained the character's creation saying: "The music was so retro and nostalgic that the character had to be created and authenticated through film, picture and music video."

In 2022, Tory Lanez was arrested for the 2020 shooting of Megan Thee Stallion, being sentenced to ten years in prison. On September 25, 2023, he shared a voicemail update from prison, announcing the deluxe re-release of his 2021 album Alone at Prom, marking his first official release following his incarceration.

== Composition ==
According to AllMusic, Alone at Prom's musical composition borrows from "early- to mid-'80s pop driven by synthesizers". Our Generation Music found its production to be "electro-inspired", also describing the album as a "time warp back into the bubblegum-pop style of 1980s." Lanez stated that with Alone at Prom he wanted to create "a full catalog now and later of pure pop, R&B, alternative and 80s rock music".

== Critical reception ==
Mason Kirby of Our Generation Music said, "Alone at Prom's remarkable retro approach not only intertwines harmoniously sung melodies with ethereal, electro-inspired production, but ascends Tory to a higher level than ever before." Andy Kellman of AllMusic defined the album "a soundtrack to idly browsing racks of distressed jeans", finding its musicality to be "in the vein of the Weeknd's After Hours".

== Copyright infringements ==
In December 2021, singer Madonna expressed her thoughts about the track "Pluto's Last Comet", alleging that Lanez plagiarized her 1985 single "Into the Groove". After she first made the allegations in an Instagram comment on Tory Lanez' page, Madonna explained her position further to Rolling Stone, saying: "I am tired of being taken advantage of and I mean business".

According to Rolling Stone, the estate of the late singer George Michael and his former Wham! bandmate Andrew Ridgeley have accused Lanez of using their song "Careless Whisper" without permission for his track "Enchanted Waterfall". In a statement, the George Michael estate and Ridgeley, who co-wrote the 1984 song with Michael, said that they had previously denied Lanez' request to sample the song for his album. Following the accusation, "Enchanted Waterfall" was removed from Spotify, but remained available on other platforms like Apple Music and Tidal.

== Track listing ==
All tracks are written by Daystar Peterson except where noted.

Alone at Prom track listing
| No. | Title | Writer(s) | Producer(s) | Length |
|---|---|---|---|---|
| 1. | "Enchanted Waterfall" | | Tropics; Bizness Boi | 3:11 |
| 2. | "Pink Dolphin Sunset" (featuring Tee) | D. Peterson; Frank Tee | Chaz Jackson; SSJ Mike; Bizness Boi; boyband | 3:32 |
| 3. | "Midnight's Interlude" | | Bizness Boi; boyband; SSJ Mike; Chaz Jackson; Lanez | 1:55 |
| 4. | "The Color Violet" | | Nik Dean; Roark Bailey; Foreign Teck | 3:46 |
| 5. | "Lavender Sunflower" | | Marcus Andersson; Ryland Blackinton; Roark Bailey; Fortune; Bizness Boi; Blake Straus | 2:31 |
| 6. | "Ballad of a Badman" | | Jet Stanley; Chaz Jackson | 4:14 |
| 7. | "Lady of Namek" | | SSJ Mike; Chaz Jackson | 3:13 |
| 8. | "Pluto's Last Comet" | | Chaz Jackson; Orlando Tha Great | 3:31 |
| 9. | "'87 Stingray" | | Chaz Jackson; Orlando tha Great; Vikaden; KrishnaMusic | 2:21 |
| 10. | "Hurt from Mercury" | | Chaz Jackson | 3:23 |
| 11. | "Last Kiss of Nebulon" | | Orlando Tha Great; SSJ Mike; Chaz Jackson | 4:18 |
| Total length: | | | | 35:50 |

Alone at Prom (Deluxe) track listing
| No. | Title | Writer(s) | Producer(s) | Length |
|---|---|---|---|---|
| 1. | "Prom King // Love on Acid" | | Chaz Jackson; King Midas; Motion Jones | 4:13 |
| 2. | "Crystal Strawberry" | | Bizness Boi; Chaz Jackson; Jordon Manswell; King Midas | 3:28 |
| 3. | "Wilona's Workshop" | | Chaz Jackson; Motion Jones | 2:53 |
| 4. | "Hurts Me" (with Trippie Redd featuring Yoko Gold) | D. Peterson; Michael Lamar White IV; Moses Peterson | Yoko Gold; Chaz Jackson | 2:20 |
| 5. | "Alexa Loves It" | | Beatmenace; Chaz Jackson; King Midas; Shndo; SSJ Mike | 2:57 |
| 6. | "Splash.Wave.Repeat (Interlude)" | | Chaz Jackson; Lil Rod; King Midas | 3:25 |
| 7. | "Poison Ivy" | | Chaz Jackson; Dre Pinckney | 3:07 |
| 8. | "Sex Anonymous" (with Yoko Gold) | D. Peterson; M. Peterson | Alize; Bizness Boi; King Midas; Motion Jones | 4:05 |
| 9. | "Shut Up & Love" | | Chaz Jackson; King Midas; Motion Jones | 3:28 |
| 10. | "Kame House" | | SSJ Mike; Motion Jones | 4:45 |
| 11. | "Loner at Sunset" | | Brian Yepes; Frankie XY | 1:30 |
| Total length: | | | | 72:08 |

Sample credits

- "Enchanted Waterfall" contains an uncredited interpolation from Wham!'s 1984 song "Careless Whisper".
- "Pluto's Last Comet" contains an uncredited sample from Madonna's 1985 song "Into the Groove".
- "Last Kiss of Nebulon" contains a sample from Philip Bailey and Phil Collins's 1984 song "Easy Lover".

== Charts ==
=== Weekly charts ===
Weekly chart performance for Alone at Prom
| Chart (2021–2023) | Peak position |
|---|---|
| Australian Vinyl Albums (ARIA) | 14 |
| Canadian Albums (Billboard) | 19 |
| Irish Albums (IRMA) | 99 |
| Lithuanian Albums (AGATA) | 44 |
| New Zealand Albums (RMNZ) | 38 |
| Norwegian Albums (VG-lista) | 18 |
| US Billboard 200 | 28 |
| US Independent Albums (Billboard) | 5 |
| US Top R&B/Hip-Hop Albums (Billboard) | 7 |

=== Year-end charts ===
2023 year-end chart performance for Alone at Prom
| Chart (2023) | Position |
|---|---|
| Icelandic Albums (Tónlistinn) | 73 |
| US Independent Albums (Billboard) | 49 |

2024 year-end chart performance for Alone at Prom
| Chart (2024) | Position |
|---|---|
| US Independent Albums (Billboard) | 38 |
| US Top R&B/Hip-Hop Albums (Billboard) | 93 |

== Certifications ==
| Region | Certification | Certified units/sales |
|---|---|---|
| New Zealand (RMNZ) | Gold | 7,500^{‡} |
| United Kingdom (BPI) | Gold | 100,000^{‡} |
| United States (RIAA) | Gold | 500,000^{‡} |
^{‡} Sales+streaming figures based on certification alone.
