= Daystar (album) =

Studio album by Tory Lanez
- Released: September 25, 2020
- Recorded: 2020
- Genres: Hip-hop; R&B
- Length: 66:00
- Label: One Umbrella
- Producers: Chazzz Music; D2; SSJMike; Unicorn Waves; BruceM8; araabMUZIK; prdbyski; Dre Pickney; PDub; YonasK; Curtis Crump Jr.; CAMEone; Iano Beatz; OceanOnTheRocks; Haze; LNK; ArmoBeatz; Edsclusive; FortyOneSix; Elkan; Othello Beats; Deandre Langford; Foreign Teck; Orlando tha Great; Smash David; Stoopid Lou; Wallis Lane; Dashawn "Happie" White

Tory Lanez chronology
The New Toronto 3 (2020)	Daystar (2020)	Loner (2020)

Daystar (stylized in all caps) is the fifth studio album by Canadian singer and rapper Tory Lanez. It was released on September 25, 2020, by One Umbrella Records and was his first independent release after departing from Interscope Records. The music was largely written by Lanez and produced with a variety of record producers, while featuring a sole guest appearance by fellow rapper Yoko Gold.

Controversy followed the album when it was released amid criminal allegations against Lanez that he had shot fellow rapper Megan Thee Stallion earlier in 2020. Many critics agreed not to review the album, while also criticizing Lanez for using it to deny the allegations. Commercially, Daystar charted at number six in Canada and became the rapper's fifth straight album to debut in the top 10 of the US Billboard 200 earning 36,000 album-equivalent units in its first week.

== Release and aftermath ==
Lanez released Daystar in part as a response to criminal allegations of him shooting fellow rapper Megan Thee Stallion earlier in 2020. Several songs on the album feature Lanez denying the accusations, including the opening song "Money Over Fallouts", in which he expresses shock at Megan Thee Stallion:

Can't cry now, I'm gonna laugh later / Girl you had the nerve to write that statement on that affidavit, knowing I don't do it / But I'm coming at my truest, tryin' to keep this shit 200 with ya, shorty / I can't prove it but them people in yo' ear/They the true ones that I feel that really got you thinking Tory Lanez would do you in for real

Many critics opted not to review Daystar, while others accused Lanez of "gaslighting his fans" with its address of the shooting allegations, according to AllHipHop reporter Yohance Kyles. Vulture writer Chris Murphy responded to the album's release with the headline: "For The Love of God, Do Not Listen to Tory Lanez's New Album 'DAYSTAR'". Andre Gee of Complex called the album "a project too contemptible to be evaluated on any musical scale" and "much worse than just a terrible album", dismissing it as an attempt by Lanez at using his platform to justify his abuse of black women. Highsnobiety announced that they would no longer cover Lanez's music, and called Daystar "the most toxic album of the year". In his list of the worst albums of 2020, Anthony Fantano of TheNeedleDrop, who also didn't formally review the album, named it the worst album of the year due to it having forgettable production and Lanez's propensity to rip off The Weeknd, Drake or "any other contemporary he thinks he can get a hit sound off of", saying that "I don't know why you would listen to this unless you were volunteering to be gaslit for an hour's worth of time."

While the case against Lanez remained postponed, the rapper followed Daystar with the release of Loner in December 2020 and Playboy in March 2021. In May, he responded on Twitter to the backlash against the album, saying, "When I do something nice it's genuinely out of the love of my heart and the pain I feel for people in need ... I don't care about repairing an image that people tried to smear and couldn't. All I can do is play my part. And I'm proud of the part I play."

== Commercial performance ==
Daystar debuted at number ten on the US Billboard 200 chart, earning 36,000 album-equivalent units (including 2,000 copies as traditional album sales) in its first week. This became Lanez's sixth album to debut in the top 10 of the chart, although it was also the lowest Billboard 200 debut of his career. The album also accumulated a total of 47.7 million on-demand streams of the album's songs during that week.

== Track listing ==
All tracks are written by Daystar Peterson. Tracks 4 and 17 feature additional writing from Yoko Gold.

Daystar track listing
No.	Title	Producer(s)	Length
1.	"Money Over Fallouts"	Chazzz Music; Foreign Teck; D2; SSJMike; Dez Wright^{[a]}; Bass Charity^{[a]}	4:42
2.	"A Woman"	Unicorn Waves; BruceM8	3:39
3.	"Friends Become Strangers"	Smash David; Wallis Lane; Arcade City Beats; TenRoc	4:14
4.	"Sorry But I Had To..." (featuring Yoko Gold)	Lyle LeDuff; Chazzz Music; SSJMike	6:21
5.	"A Poem from Me 2 You"		0:48
6.	"The Most High"	AraabMuzik; Tory Lanez	4:10
7.	"Look How GOD Works"	Chazzz Music; Dashawn "Happie" White	3:15
8.	"Queen and Slim"	Foreign Teck; Chazzz Music; Dez Wright; Stoopid Lou; SSJMike	5:19
9.	"What's Kulture??"	Chazzz Music; prdbyski; Orlando tha Great; Dre Pinckney	3:10
10.	"Solar Drive @ Night"	Chazzz Music; Orlando tha Great; PDub; YonasK	2:32
11.	"Bittersweet"	Lyle LeDuff; Curtis Crump Jr.; CAMEone; Tory Lanez	5:29
12.	"Things I Should of Said"	Iano Beatz; Haze; LNK; ArmoBeatz; OceanOnTheRocks	2:39
13.	"Just Got It Done"	Chazzz Music; D2; SSJMike	2:27
14.	"Jokes on Me"	Chazzz Music; Edsclusive; FortyOneSix; Elkan; SSJMike; OceanOnTheRocks	3:19
15.	"Care for You"	Chazzz Music; Othello Beats; Dre Pickney	5:05
16.	"In the Air"	Chazzz Music; D2; SSJMike	4:08
17.	"Life" (featuring Yoko Gold)	Chazzz Music; Orlando tha Great; SSJMike	4:57
Total length:			66:00

Notes

- ^{^[a]} signifies a co-producer

== Charts ==
Chart performance for Daystar
Chart (2020)	Peak position
Belgian Albums (Ultratop Flanders)	131
Canadian Albums (Billboard)	6
Dutch Albums (Album Top 100)	48
US Billboard 200	10
US Independent Albums (Billboard)	3
US Top R&B/Hip-Hop Albums (Billboard)	4
