= Brownstone discography =

- Studio albums: 2
- Compilation albums: 2
- Singles: 8

This is the discography of American R&B group Brownstone.

== Studio albums ==
Year	Album details	Peak chart positions								Certifications (sales thresholds)
Year	Album details	US	US R&B	AUS	CAN	GER	NLD	NZ	UK	Certifications (sales thresholds)
1995	From the Bottom Up: Released: January 10, 1995; Label: MJJ Music; Formats: CD, cassette, LP	29	4	17	40	91	14	25	18	RIAA: Platinum; BPI: Silver
1997	Still Climbing: Released: June 24, 1997; Label: MJJ Music; Formats: CD, cassette, LP	51	16	—	—	—	73	—	19	
"—" denotes a recording that did not chart or was not released in that territory.

=== Compilation albums ===
- All for Love (2000, Sony Music)
- Super Hits (2009, Sony Music)

== Singles ==
Year	Title	Peak chart positions										Certifications	Album
Year	Title	US	US R&B	US Dan	US A/C	AUS	CAN	IRE	NLD	NZ	UK	Certifications	Album
1994	"Pass the Lovin'"	—	58	42	—	—	—	—	—	22	—		From the Bottom Up
1994	"If You Love Me"	8	2	—	38	13	69	15	16	1	8	RIAA: Gold; ARIA: Gold; BPI: Silver; RMNZ: Gold	From the Bottom Up
1995	"Grapevyne"	49	6	—	—	44	—	—	—	15	16		From the Bottom Up
1995	"I Can't Tell You Why"	54	22	—	—	57	—	—	—	6	27		From the Bottom Up
1997	"5 Miles to Empty"	39	6	38	—	—	—	—	—	5	12		Still Climbing
1997	"Kiss and Tell"	102	41	—	—	—	—	—	—	47	21		Still Climbing
2022	"All I Want"	—	—	—	—	—	—	—	—	—	—		Non-album singles
2023	"Ain't No Mountain High Enough"	—	—	—	—	—	—	—	—	—	—		Non-album singles
"—" denotes a recording that did not chart or was not released in that territory.

=== Featured singles ===
Year	Title	Artist	Peak positions		Album
Year	Title	Artist	US	US R&B	Album
1995	"Freedom (Theme from Panther)"	Various Artists	45	18	Panther

=== Other appearances ===
Year	Title	Artist	Peak positions		Album
Year	Title	Artist	US	US R&B	Album
1998	"Searching (For Your Love)"	Various Artists	—	—	Woo
