= I Told You =

Studio album by Tory Lanez
- Released: August 19, 2016
- Recorded: 2015–16
- Genres: PBR&B; hip-hop; dancehall
- Length: 78:53
- Labels: Mad Love; Interscope
- Producers: Benjamin "Benny Blanco" Levin (exec.); Daniel "Play Picasso" Gonzalez (also exec.); Ben Free; Cashmere Cat; D33J; DJ Dahi; Fabio Almeida; Frank Dukes; Happy Perez; JProof; Lavish; Matti Free; Nito Jamez; Noah Breakfast; Pop Wansel; Sergio Romero; Toro; Trvpvee; Tory Lanez; Two Inch Punch; XXYYXX

Tory Lanez chronology
The New Toronto (2015)	I Told You (2016)	Chixtape IV (2017)

Singles from I Told You
- 1. "Say It" Released: July 15, 2015; 2. "Luv" Released: June 9, 2016

I Told You is the debut studio album by Canadian singer Tory Lanez. It was released on August 19, 2016, through Mad Love Records and Interscope Records. Recording sessions took place from 2015 to 2016. The production on the album was contributed by Lanez, alongside several other record producers such as Benny Blanco, Cashmere Cat, Frank Dukes, DJ Dahi, Pop Wansel and Noah Breakfast, among others.

I Told You was supported by two singles: "Say It" and "Luv". Despite commercial success, the album received generally mixed reviews from music critics. It debuted at number four on the US Billboard 200 chart, earning 52,000 album-equivalent units in its first week.

== Recording and production ==
In an interview with HotNewHipHop, Lanez spoke on the album: "I was tryna come up with a title for mad long and that what was kind of slowing me down cause I didn't want to make music off the wrong title... I might fuck around and not put no features on it. It has to have features that I can put on it and then there's those days where I'm like 'you know, I don't really need any features on it'. I prefer albums in the 10-12 [track list range], you know that 18 be too long sometime because sometimes I wanna listen to an album from top to front and 18 songs is like 70 minutes of music. That's too much for me to comprehend and understand and I really want people to look at the musicalities of what we're putting out as far as the product and how good it is."

== Release and promotion ==
In August 2015, Lanez performed on the Mac Miller's GO:OD AM Tour. On October 15, 2015, the singer announced that he will be headlining "The Swavenation Tour" with fellow American rapper Boogie. On December 25, 2015, these mixtapes such as Chixtape III and The New Toronto were promoted as the prelude for his major-label debut album.

On April 1, 2016, the singer and fellow American rapper ASAP Ferg announced that they will be performing in "The Level Up Tour", setting up the two to perform in a special joint set, trading off between their own tracks and collaborations. On June 10, 2016, Lanez revealed the title to the album and tweeted, "The Album is coming this summer".

On July 7, 2016, the singer announced that he will be headlining the I Told You tour, to support the album. The tour started on July 22, in WayHome Music & Arts Festival in Oro-Medonte, Ontario. Lanez will be traveling across North America through December 2016, with stops at Lollapalooza, Austin City Limits, Made in America, and the Mad Decent Block Party.

== Singles ==
On July 15, 2015, Lanez released the first single from the album, called "Say It". The song was produced by Pop Wansel and Toro. The music video was released on August 11, 2015. The song peaked at number 23 on the US Billboard Hot 100, and number 10 on the US Hot R&B/Hip-Hop Songs charts. On June 9, 2016, Lanez released the second single from the album, called "Luv" on iTunes. The song was produced by Cashmere Cat and Benny Blanco. The song peaked at number 19 on the US Billboard Hot 100, and number 9 on the US Hot R&B/Hip-Hop Songs charts.

== Critical reception ==
Professional ratings
Review scores
Source	Rating
AllMusic	3/5 stars
Exclaim!	6/10
HipHopDX	2.8/5
HotNewHipHop	80%
Now	3/5 stars
Pitchfork	6.3/10
PopMatters	5/10 stars

In a positive review, online publication HotNewHipHop, who collectively rated the album an 80, described the album as an "ambitious and lavish" project that showed that Lanez's future seemed "only brighter from here". Kevin Ritchie of Now was also positive towards the project, saying that the album made "a convincing case for Lanez's pop appeal".

== Commercial performance ==
I Told You debuted at number four on the US Billboard 200 chart, earning 52,000 album-equivalent units (including 32,000 copies as pure album sales) in its first week. This became Tory Lanez's first US top-ten debut on the chart. The album also debuted at number two on the US Top R&B/Hip-Hop Albums chart. In its second week, the album dropped to number 16 on the chart, earning an additional 21,000 units. As of March 2018, the album has earned 538,000 album-equivalent units and 95,000 copies in pure album sales in the US, according to Nielsen Music. On March 16, 2021, the album was certified gold by the Recording Industry Association of America (RIAA) for combined sales and album-equivalenut units of over 500,000 units in the United States.

== Track listing ==
Credits adapted from the album's liner notes.

Standard edition
No.	Title	Writer(s)	Producer(s)	Length
1.	"I Told You / Another One"	Daystar Peterson; Daniel Gonzalez; Carl Caruso; Sarah Johnson	Play Picasso; Lavish; Tory Lanez	8:39
2.	"Guns and Roses"	Peterson; Gonzalez; Benjamin Ash; Noah Beresin; Matti Beresin	Play Picasso; Two Inch Punch; Noah Breakfast; Matti Free; Tory Lanez	4:28
3.	"Flex"	Peterson; Gonzalez; Caruso; Marcel Everet; Vanessa Elisha; Johnson	Lavish; Play Picasso; XXYYXX; Tory Lanez	5:45
4.	"To D.R.E.A.M."	Peterson; Nathan Perez; Gonzalez; Ash; Javeon McCarthy	Play Picasso; Happy Perez; Tory Lanez; Two Inch Punch	6:34
5.	"4AM Flex"	Peterson; Gonzalez; Sergio Romero	Play Picasso; Romero	4:27
6.	"Friends with Benefits"	Peterson; Perez; Gonzalez; Adam Feeney	Tory Lanez; Play Picasso; Happy Perez; Frank Dukes	5:29
7.	"Cold Hard Love"	Peterson; Perez; Gonzalez	Happy Perez; Play Picasso; Tory Lanez	5:58
8.	"High"	Magnus Høiberg; Benjamin Levin; Peterson; Perez; Gonzalez	Cashmere Cat; Benny Blanco; Happy Perez; Play Picasso; Tory Lanez	4:24
9.	"Dirty Money"	Peterson; Gonzalez	Play Picasso; Tory Lanez	5:37
10.	"Question Is"	Peterson; Autoro Whitfield; Jameel Roberts; Andrew Wansel	Pop Wansel; Toro	7:11
11.	"Loners Blvd"	Peterson; Dacoury Natche; Beresin; Benjamin Freedlander	DJ Dahi; Noah Breakfast; Ben Free^{[a]}	6:58
12.	"All the Girls"	Peterson; Perez; Gonzalez	Happy Perez; Play Picasso; Tory Lanez	4:48
13.	"Say It"	Peterson; Wansel; Whitfield; David Hall; Nichole Gilbert; Gordon Chambers	Pop Wansel; Toro	4:26
14.	"Luv"	Høiberg; Levin; Peterson; Anthony Kelly; Wayne Passley; Mark Wolfe; Stephen Marsden	Cashmere Cat; Benny Blanco	4:09
Total length:				78:53

Target deluxe edition (bonus disc)
No.	Title	Writer(s)	Producer(s)	Length
15.	"Come Back to Me"	Peterson; Gonzalez; Romero; Von Charles; Marsden	Play Picasso; Romero	3:08
16.	"Honda Civic"	Peterson; Djavan Santos	D33J	4:49
Total length:				83:70

Notes

- ^{^[a]} signifies a co-producer
- A skit is featured in between each track
- "I Told You / Another One" features additional vocals by Nichole Gilbert and Teisha J. Brown
- "Guns And Roses" and "4AM Flex" features additional vocals by Kadeem Brown and Elizabeth Ruiz
- "Flex" features additional vocals by Kadeem Brown and Mikhail McCreath
- "To D.R.E.A.M." features additional vocals by Javeon McCarthy and Kadeem Brown
- "High" and "Dirty Money" features additional vocals by Elizabeth Ruiz and Robert Brown
- "Question Is" features vocals by Brianna Cash and additional vocals by Teisha J. Brown, Nichole Gilbert and Elizabeth Ruiz
- "Loners Blvd" features additional vocals by Matthew Adam, Sebastian Jorge Rompotis and Sonstar Peterson
- "Say It" features additional vocals by Elizabeth Ruiz

Sample credits

- "Say It" contains elements and samples from "If You Love Me", written by Gordon Chambers, David Hall and Nichole Gilbert, as performed by Brownstone.
- "Luv" contains interpolations from "Everyone Falls In Love", written by Anthony Kelly, Wayne Passley, Mark Wolfe and Stephen Marsden, as performed by Tanto Metro & Devonte
- "Come Back to Me" contains elements and samples from "No Letting Go", written by Von Charles and Stephen Marsden, as performed by Wayne Wonder.
- "High" contains a sample of "In the Meantime", written and performed by Tinashe, Produced by T-Minus.
- "Friends With Benefits" contains a sample of "Stunt", written and performed by Tinashe, Produced by Frank Dukes & !llmind.

== Personnel ==
Credits adapted from the album's liner notes.

Musicians

- Play Picasso – instrumentation (tracks 1–9, 12), programming (tracks 1–9, 12)
- Lavish – instrumentation (tracks 1, 3), programming (tracks 1, 3)
- Two Inch Punch – instrumentation (tracks 2, 4), programming (tracks 2, 4)
- Noah Breakfast – instrumentation (tracks 2, 11), programming (tracks 2, 11)
- Matti Free – instrumentation (track 2), programming (track 2)
- XXYYXX – instrumentation (track 3), programming (track 3)
- Happy Perez – instrumentation (tracks 4, 6–8, 12), programming (tracks 4, 6, 8, 12)
- Sergio R. – instrumentation (track 4), programming (track 4)
- Frank Dukes – instrumentation (track 6), programming (track 6)
- Benny Blanco – instrumentation (tracks 8, 14), programming (tracks 8, 14)
- Cashmere Cat – instrumentation (tracks 8, 14), programming (tracks 8, 14)
- Daystar Peterson – instrumentation (track 9), programming (track 9)
- Pop Wansel – instrumentation (tracks 10, 13), programming (tracks 10, 13)
- Autoro Whitfield – keyboards (track 10), instrumentation (track 13), programming (track 13)
- Jameel Roberts – keyboards (track 10)
- DJ Dahi – instrumentation (track 11), programming (track 11)
- Ben Free – instrumentation (track 11), programming (track 11)

Technical

- Daniel "Play Picasso" Gonzalez – engineering (tracks 1–12, 14)
- Johann Chavez – engineering (tracks 1, 5, 10, 14)
- Noah" Breakfast" Beresin – engineering (track 2)
- Daniel Fyfe – engineering (track 3)
- DJ Dahi – engineering (track 11)
- Kyle VandeKerhoff – engineering (track 13)
- Juan Carlos Torrado – engineering (track 13)
- Joe Gallagher – engineering (track 13)
- Mark "Spike" Stent – mixing (all tracks)
- Geoff Swan – mixing assistance (all tracks)
- Michael Freeman – mixing assistance (all tracks)
- Chris Gehringer – mastering (all tracks)

Production

- Zvi "The Real Hoody Allen" Edelman – production coordination (all tracks)
- Andrew "McMuffin" Luftman – production coordination (all tracks)
- Seif "Mageef" Hussain – production coordination (all tracks)
- Astrid "Aaaaastriiiiid" Taylor – production coordination (all tracks)
- Sascha Stone Guttfreund – production coordination (all tracks)
- Joey Mingioni – production coordination (track 27)
- Brandon "Bdot" Zajac – production coordination (track 12)
- Donnie Meadows – production coordination (track 13)
- Tanisha Broadwater – production coordination (track 13)

Additional personnel

- Matt Adam – creative director
- Nick Bilardello – creative director
- Stephanie Hsu – coordinator

== Charts ==
=== Weekly charts ===
Chart (2016)	Peak position
Australian Albums (ARIA)	37
Belgian Albums (Ultratop Flanders)	69
Belgian Albums (Ultratop Wallonia)	98
Canadian Albums (Billboard)	5
Dutch Albums (Album Top 100)	23
French Albums (SNEP)	92
New Zealand Heatseeker Albums (RMNZ)	4
Norwegian Albums (VG-lista)	33
Swiss Albums (Schweizer Hitparade)	36
UK Albums (Official Charts)	18
UK Album Downloads (Official Charts)	12
UK R&B Albums (Official Charts)	5
US Billboard 200	4
US Top R&B/Hip-Hop Albums (Billboard)	2

=== Year-end charts ===
Chart (2016)	Position
US Billboard 200	164
US Top R&B/Hip-Hop Albums (Billboard)	46

== Certifications ==
Region	Certification	Certified units/sales
United States (RIAA)	Gold	500,000^{‡}
^{‡} Sales+streaming figures based on certification alone.
