= Distancia =

Distancia may refer to:

== Film and TV ==
- Distancias (film), 2008 Spanish documentary film
- La Distancia (2006 film), 2006 film with Miguel Ángel Silvestre

== Music ==
=== Albums ===
- Distancia (José José album)
- Distancia (Magos Herrera album)
- La Distancia (EP), by Deny
- Distancias (album) by Puerto Rican folk singer Roy Brown, 1977

=== Songs ===
- "Distância", Brazilian bolero sung by Dalva de Oliveira, composed by Marino Pinto
- "La distancia ", song by Roberto Carlos, a Spanish number-one singles of 1974
- "A Distância", Brazilian version of the Spanish song also sung by Roberto Carlos
- "La distancia", song by Yolandita from Sueños
- "Distancia", Spanish song from Distancia
- "La Distancia", song by Deny from Por Siempre

== Other ==
- La distancia, poem by Rubén Martínez
