= Cirse (band) =

Argentine pop punk band

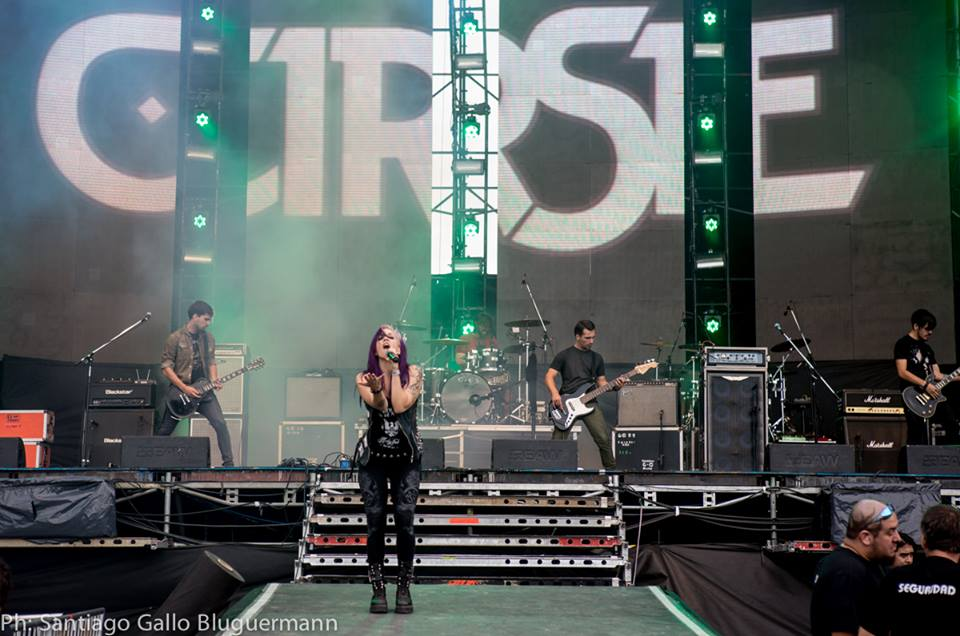

Background information
- Origin: José Mármol, Buenos Aires, Argentina
- Genres: Pop punk, alternative rock
- Years active: 2003-2019
- Members: Luciana Segovia; Gabriel Leopardi; Sebastián Leopardi; Christian Bonelli; Martin Magliano
- Past members: Luisao Fernández; Geronimo Pastore (d. 2010); Diego Lucas
- Website: www.cirse.com.ar

Cirse is an Argentine pop punk band from Adrogué, Buenos Aires. Before disbanding, the group consisted of vocalist Luciana Segovia, guitarists Gabriel Leopardi and Christian Bonelli, bassist Sebastián "Ziva" Leopardi and drummer Martin "Tato" Magliano.

Since today the band released five full-length-albums, two EPs and eight music videos. Cirse toured extensively through Argentina, played at Pepsi Music Festival in 2011 and 2012 and played with bands like Duran Duran, Paramore, Avril Lavigne, Evanescence, Carajo and DENY.

== History ==
=== 2003-2009: Early work ===
Cirse was founded in José Mármol near Argentina's capital Buenos Aires in 2003 by vocalist Luciana Segovia and brothers Gabriel (Guitar) and Sebastián "Ziva" Leopardi (Bass). Soon after the band was formed, Luisao Fernández joined the trio as a drummer. Cirse started writing material for a first demo release that they ended up developing into their first EP.

Together with Cesar Andino from Cabezones the group worked on an EP which was released in 2006. The EP Algo Quedará was self-released. Andino decided to work with the band again for their first full album. The band covered the Luis Alberto Spinetta song "Alma De Diamante" which was featured on their debut album. Bi-Polar, the debut album, was released on December 14, 2007 nationwide. The band filmed a music video for their song "Muy Tarde" which aired on MTV, MuchMusic and Argentine national music television channel, CMTV.

=== 2009-2013: Imaginario ===
Luisao Fernández left band in 2009 and was replaced by Geronimo Pastore. The band worked on new material for their second album which is entitled Imaginario. Pastore who joined the group in 2009 died surprisingly during the work on the new record in 2010. The band recruited Diego Lucas as new drummer.

Listeners of radio station FM Rock & Pop voted Cirse as winner of Bombardeo del Demo so the group was allowed to share stage with national well-known band Catupecu Machu at Teatro Colegiales in Buenos Aires. After a summer tour the band was asked to be opener for Paramore at their show in Buenos Aires at Luna Park on February 24, 2011. This concert was part of the Brand New Eyes World Tour. Through the success the band's second music video was aired at MTV.

In May and July 2011 the band toured the region Buenos Aires and South West of Argentina including shows in Lanús, Quilmes, Santa Fe and Ramos Mejía. Short after that tour the band supported Avril Lavigne at Estadio Malvinas Argentinas in Mendoza on July 24, 2011. Two month later the band won a slot at 2011s edition of Pepsi Music Festival through a competition hosted via social network Facebook. In November 2011 the band premiered their third music video Juré on a concert at La Trastienda Club.

The band toured at Argentinas´ coast again, including shows in Mar del Plata and Villa Gesell. On May 4, 2012 the band opened a show for Duran Duran. Diego Lucas left band and recruited Martin Magliano in 2012 and Christian Bonelli joined band as second guitarist. Cirse released a new music video for Apuesta on July 7, 2012. On October 21, 2012 Cirse was confirmed to play again at Pepsi Music Festival. The band played on the Main Stage with bands like Carajo and Evanescence who performed on Main Stage the same day. A few weeks later the band released their 3-track-EP called Apuesta.

On April 23, 2013 the band played a gig for the Resistance Tour in Temperley with DENY and Bulldog.

=== 2013-2019: Rompiente ===
In April and May 2013 the band started working on their third album which was later entitled Rompiente. On August 7, 2013 the band released Miedos as first single as music video via YouTube. The album was released on August 23, 2013 officially during a release party at Teatro Vorterix in Buenos Aires. This show was a celebration show for the ten years anniversary of the bands´ existence. Although they released their music independently, this album was distributed by Argentine record label Pinhead Records.

On June 3, 2019, after completing a tour in Mexico, the band announced that they would be separating and moving on to different projects. The Leopardi brothers and Magliano went on to form a new group with singer Ana Devin, called "Ramen", and Segovia chose to move into a solo career.

== Discography ==
=== Studio albums ===
Year	Album	Label
2007	Bi-Polar	Self-released
2010	Imaginario	Self-released
2013	Rompiente	Self-released

=== EP ===
Year	Album	Label
2012	Apuesta	Self-released

=== Music videos ===
Year	Title	Album
2007	"Muy Tarde"	Bi-Polar
2011	"Invisible"	Imaginario
2011	"Asesina Serial"	Imaginario
2011	"Juré"	Imaginario
2012	"Ahi Estaré"	Imaginario
2012	"Apuesta"	Apuesta
2013	"Por Tu Bien"	Apuesta
2013	"Miedos"	Rompiente
2014	"Rompiente"	Rompiente
2014	"Inocencia"	Rompiente

== Members ==
Current members

- Luciana Segovia - lead vocals (2003–2019)
- Gabriel Leopardi - guitar, backing vocals (2003–2019)
- Sebastián "Ziva" Leopardi - bass, backing vocals (2003–2019)
- Christian "Nek" Bonelli - rhythm guitar (2012–2019)
- Martin "Tato" Magliano - drums (2012–2019)

Former members

- Lucas Diego - drums (2010–2012)
- Gerónimo Pastore - drums (2009–2010; died 2010)
- Luisao Fernández - drums (2003–2009)
