= Nicci Gilbert =

American R&B singer

- Born: Detroit, Michigan, U.S.
- Genres: R&B, soul, gospel
- Occupations: Singer, songwriter, actress
- Instruments: Vocals, drums, keys
- Years active: 1994–present
- Labels: Epic Records (1994–1998); MJJ Music (1994–1998); MCA (2002–2005); Brownstone Recordings (2005–present)
- Website: Nicci Gilbert on X

Nicci Gilbert is a Grammy-nominated American R&B singer. She is mainly known for being the lead vocalist of the American female R&B girl-group Brownstone who rose to fame in the mid-1990s best known for their 1995 hit single "If You Love Me", which was nominated for a Best R&B Performance Grammy Award. "Grapevyne" and "Pass the Lovin'" also brought them some success, as well as their rendition of "I Can't Tell You Why", a song originally recorded by The Eagles.

Following the disbandment of the group in 1997, Gilbert made her theatrical film debut in the 1998 movie, Woo. Gilbert returned to the music industry after a five-year hiatus as a solo singer and released her debut album Grown Folks Music (2003) through MCA Records.

In 2012, she starred as a cast member and executive producer in the TV One's R&B Divas: Atlanta, which features the lives of five 1990s chart-topping R&B singers. She was featured in 2 seasons of the show. She also performed with the group at events such as Essence Music Festival.

== Early life ==
Nicci Gilbert was born in Detroit, Michigan to Black American parents. Gilbert grew up in Detroit, where her mother Helene was a jazz singer. Gilbert's mom did a lot to encourage her interest in music, and when she was in high school, Gilbert performed Madonna's "Crazy for You" in a talent show.

After graduating from high school, Gilbert studied music and drama at Eastern Michigan University. But she ended up dropping out after two years so that she could move to Los Angeles with a friend and be closer to the music industry. It was a risky move, but one that eventually paid off for her. At first, Gilbert struggled there, where she appeared in various talent shows while paying her bills with non-musical "day gigs" (including a job at Taco Bell). But things started to pick up for Gilbert when, in 1993, she formed Brownstone's original lineup with Monica Doby and Charmayne Maxwell.

== Career ==
=== 1993–1997: Brownstone ===
In 1994, Brownstone signed with R&B/pop superstar Michael Jackson's MJJ Music, which was distributed by Epic Records and Sony Records. Their debut "Pass the Lovin" was released in the United States on August 2, 1994. The song failed to make impact on the Billboard Hot 100, however the single peaked at number fifty-eight on the Hot R&B/Hip-Hop Songs chart and number forty-two on the Hot Dance Club Songs chart. Their debut album From the Bottom Up was released on January 10, 1995, and reached its peak at number twenty-nine on the Billboard Hot 200 chart. Their next single, "If You Love Me", became a smash hit charting at number eight on the Billboard Hot 100 and number two on the Hot R&B/Hip-Hop Songs Chart in the United States. "Grapevyne" and "I Can't Tell You Why" were released as the third and fourth singles from album, respectively, but were not successful as "If You Love Me" charting at numbers forty-nine and fifty-four on the Billboard Hot 100. From the Bottom Up also contained Brownstone's hit remake of the Eagles' "I Can't Tell You Why", which was originally a pop/rock tune but received an urban contemporary makeover from Gilbert and her colleagues.

Band member Monica Doby left the group due to internal strife with Gilbert and she was replaced by Kina Cosper. In 1997, Brownstone unveiled their new lineup on the trio's second album Still Climbing released on June 24, 1997, which turned out to be their final album. The album was preceded by two singles "5 Miles to Empty" and "Kiss and Tell" to promote the album. "5 Miles to Empty" peaked at number thirty-nine on the Billboard Hot 100, but the second single failed to chart on the Hot 100. Much to the disappointment of Brownstone's fans, the group broke up that year.

=== 1996–1998: TV acting career and Film debut ===
In 1996, Gilbert branched out into acting and having roles on various television programs including Martin and Living Single. She appeared on the Fox hit show Martin as "Alesha" in the episode "Martin, I Want to Sing" and as Helen Robinson on Living Single in the episode "School's Out Forever".

In 1998, Gilbert appeared on Sister, Sister as Nurse Shelley in the episode "In Sickness and Health". Months later, Gilbert made her theatrical film debut in romantic comedy Woo as Crayola. The film was met with very negative reviews from audiences and critics.

=== 2002–2005: Return to music, debut album and stage debut ===
After taking a five-year hiatus Gilbert returned to the music industry signed with MCA Records in 2002. Her debut single "My Side of the Story" was released as the lead single and intended title track from the album of the same name, before it was shortly changed to Grown Folks Music, impacting radio on October 28, 2002. In 2003, the label became defunct, which led to the album being shelved. During an interview in 2011 with You Know I Got Soul when asked about her album Gilbert states "this was around the time where things pretty much ended for MCA. I asked for my masters and they gave them to me. I own the masters to the album and it's available on iTunes." The album was later released independently on March 8, 2005, but failed to make impact on charts in the United States.

In 2004, Gilbert starred in Tyler Perry's stage play Meet the Browns as Vera Brown. It was released to DVD through Lionsgate on June 28, 2005.

=== 2010– Present: Soul Kittens Cabaret, R&B Divas Atlanta, From The Bottom Up and New Music ===
On October 11, 2010, a trailer for the stage musical Soul Kittens Cabaret directed by Gilbert, was released to YouTube via American Technologies. The musical features R&B singers Faith Evans, Fantasia Barrino, Monifah, Syleena Johnson and Gilbert. It was released to DVD on January 11, 2011.

In 2012, she executive produced TV One's R&B Divas, whereas she was cast alongside singers Faith Evans, Keke Wyatt, Monifah, and Syleena Johnson. The show documents the singers living in Atlanta, Georgia as they work towards rebuilding their careers. Gilbert appeared on the show for seasons one and two, becoming one of the more notable and controversial figures on the show. The first episode aired on August 20, 2012. Throughout the show, R&B Divas singers collaborated on a charity album commemorating the life of Whitney Houston, featuring the single "Love Yourself" which is also featured in the TV show's introduction. Proceeds of the album went towards benefiting organizations committed to improving the lives of women. In 2015, she partnered with Queen Latifah to produce a series for BET Networks called From The Bottom Up a series she created and executive produced for two seasons in 2015 to present.

On April 7, 2017, Gilbert released a single called "Fly" through Brownstone Records.

In July 2022, Gilbert became an honorary inductee into Sigma Gamma Rho sorority.

== Discography ==
Albums

- Grown Folks Music (2005)

== Filmography ==
=== Films ===
Year	Title	Role	Notes
1998	Woo	Crayola	
2011	Soul Kittens Cabaret	Carmen	Director
2018	Social Conflict	Charmayne	Short film

=== Television ===
Year	Title	Role	Notes
1994	Soul Train	Herself	Episode: "Public Enemy/El DeBarge/Brownstone"
1995	Fully Booked	Herself	Episode: "Episode #1.12"
1995	Top of the Pops	Herself	2 episodes
1995	Midnight Mac	Herself	Episode: "Episode #1.2"
1996	New York Undercover	Herself	Episode: "Bad Blood"
1996	Martin	Alesha	Episode: "Martin, I Want to Sing"
1996	Living Single	Helen Robinson	Episode: "School's Out Forever"
1998	Sister, Sister	Nurse Shelley	Episode: "In Sickness and in Health"
2012–13	R&B Divas: Atlanta	Herself	Main cast: season 1–2
2013	Divas and Cocktails	Herself	Main cast
2014	The Real Housewives of Atlanta	Herself	Episode: "Final Curtain Call"
2019	She Speaks Live	Herself/host	TV series

=== Plays ===
Year	Title	Role	Notes
2004	Meet the Browns	Vera Brown	
