= Say It (Tory Lanez song) =

Single by Tory Lanez

from the album I Told You
- Released: July 15, 2015
- Recorded: 2015
- Genre: Alternative R&B; hip-hop
- Length: 3:58 (single version); 4:26 (album version)
- Label: Mad Love; Interscope
- Songwriters: Daystar Peterson; Andrew Wansel; Gordon Chambers; David Hall; Nichole Gilbert; Autoro Whitfield; Fabio Almeida
- Producers: Pop Wansel; Toro; Fbeezy; FlameGod

Tory Lanez singles chronology
"Karrueche" (2015)	"Say It" (2015)	"Initiation" (2015)

Music video
- "Say It" on YouTube

"Say It" is the debut single by the Canadian singer and rapper Tory Lanez, released on July 15, 2015, through Mad Love Records and Interscope Records as the lead single from debut studio album, I Told You (2016). The song was written by Tory Lanez, while production was handed by Pop Wansel, Toro, Fbeezy and FlameGod. Music journalists said the track drew similarities to work by the Weeknd and Future.

Upon its release, "Say it" was met with positive reviews from music critics, who generally praised it as a fun and energetic track. The song was accompanied by a music video that depicts Tory in a car and features former Vine star Wolf Tyla. The song would be release under the Fargo Fridays series, and focuses on Lanez' wish for his lover to prove he loves him for more than his money and fame.

== Background ==
It samples the song "If You Love Me" by Brownstone. The song's accompanying music video premiered on August 10, 2015, on Tory's Vevo account on YouTube and features former Vine star Wolf Tyla. Since its release, the video has received over 300 million views.

== Composition ==
"Say It" is an alternative R&B with elements of hip-hop, featuring a smooth, melodic sound. The track prominently incorporates a sample of the 1994 R&B song "If You Love Me" by Brownstone. Throughout the song, Tory Lanez switches between singing and melodic rapping while reflects on a romantic relationship while questioning whether the girl's feelings are genuine or influenced by his success and wealth. The vocals from Brownstone and Lanez would go together in the hook.

== Remix and cover versions ==
Sevyn Streeter released a remix of the song, with lyric changes. Ed Sheeran released a cover on SoundCloud. Tory revealed Kanye West's team reached out for the instrumental to record a remix of the song, but the remix has yet to be released. Fifth Harmony's Normani also released a cover of the song.

== Charts ==
=== Weekly charts ===
Chart (2015–2016)	Peak position
Canada Hot 100 (Billboard)	62
US Billboard Hot 100	23
US Hot R&B/Hip-Hop Songs (Billboard)	10
US Pop Airplay (Billboard)	40
US R&B/Hip-Hop Airplay (Billboard)	1
US Rhythmic Airplay (Billboard)	1

=== Year-end charts ===
Chart (2016)	Position
US Billboard Hot 100	74
US Hot R&B/Hip-Hop Songs (Billboard)	24
US Rhythmic (Billboard)	21

== Certifications ==
Region	Certification	Certified units/sales
Brazil (Pro-Música Brasil)	Gold	30,000^{‡}
United Kingdom (BPI)	Gold	400,000^{‡}
United States (RIAA)	3× Platinum	3,000,000^{‡}
^{‡} Sales+streaming figures based on certification alone.
