= All for Love =

All for Love may refer to:

== Books and plays ==
- All for Love (play), a 1677 play by John Dryden
- All for Love, a 1996 novel by Raynetta Mañees

== Film and television ==
- All For Love (1912 film), a lost Universal film directed by Harry Solter
- All for Love (1930 film), a Czech comedy film directed by Martin Frič
- All for Love (1933 film), a French-German comedy film directed by Joe May
- All for Love, a 1971 South Korean film starring Shin Young-kyun
- All for Love (British TV series), a 1980s UK anthology series
- All for Love (Colombian TV series), a Colombian telenovela
- All for Love (1998 film) or St. Ives, a TV movie starring Miranda Richardson
- All for Love (2005 film), a South Korean film starring Uhm Jung-hwa
- All for Love (2012 film), a Chinese film

== Music ==
- All for Love (band), an Argentine metalcore band from Buenos Aires

=== Albums ===
- All for Love (Brownstone album)
- All for Love (New Edition album)
- All for Love (Timmy T album)
- All for Love, a 2008 album by the Planetshakers band
- All for Love, a 1987 album by Princess

=== Songs ===
- "All for Love" (song), a 1993 song by Bryan Adams, Rod Stewart, and Sting, also covered by E.M.D.
- "All 4 Love", a 1991 song by Color Me Badd
- "All for Love", an unreleased song by The Beatles intended for The Beatles Anthology
- "All for Love", by Eric Carmen from Tonight You're Mine
- "All for Love", by Joe Satriani from Shapeshifting
- "All for Love", by Hillsong United from Look to You
- "All for Love", by Lady Antebellum from Golden
- "All for Love", by Nancy Wilson from the soundtrack for the film Say Anything...
- "All for Love", by Ronan Keating featuring Guy Sebastian from Keating's album Duet
- "All for Love", by Seal from Seal 6: Commitment
- "All for Love", by Sean Hayes from Flowering Spade
- "All for Love", by Serena Ryder from Is It O.K.
- "All for Love", by Sigala from Brighter Days
- "All for Love", by Whitesnake from Good to Be Bad
- "All for Love (Backpack Remix)", a song by Adriana Evans from El Camino
- "All for Love", by Madison Beer featuring Jack & Jack
- "All for Love", by Tungevaag & Raaban
- "All for Love", by Wizkid featuring Bucie from Sounds from the Other Side
