= All for Love (band) =

Argentine metalcore band

- Origin: Buenos Aires, Argentina
- Genres: Metalcore, post hardcore
- Years active: 2008-present
- Label: Pinhead
- Members: Rodrigo Rabita; Jonathan Moreno; Nicolás M. Veron; Sam Benitez; Julio Di Benedetto
- Past members: Guido De la Vega; Joel Maidana; Esteban Ivani; Jean Pierre Moreno; Ezequiel Benitez; Tito Placenti; Damian Blanco
- Website: Official Facebook

All for Love was an Argentine metalcore band from Buenos Aires formed in 2008.

== History ==
All for Love formed in Buenos Aires, Argentina in 2008 by unclean vocalist Rodrigo Rabita, clean vocalist Jean Pierre Moreno, the guitarists Guido De la Vega and Jonathan Moreno, as well as bassist Tito Placenti and drummer Joel Maidana. Maidana and De la Vega left band and got replaced by Ezequiel Benitez on drums and Damian Blanco on guitar.

The band signed a contract with Avalancha Producciones for producing a four-track-EP. During recording process the band decided to make a full-length album instead of an EP. The band hoped to release their debut album, entitled Dejando el Ayer on December 14, 2012 but due to a technical defect the album release was postponed. The musicians released several songs from the recording on YouTube instead. After signing to Argentine punk label Pinhead Records on June 20, 2013 the band stated releasing the album on July 15, 2013 nationwide via Pinhead Records. Dejando el Ayer was recorded at PGM Studios and was produced by Nico Ghiglione. The band toured Argentina extensively to promote their album. The band released two music videos for the songs Cuando Algien Se Nos Va and Hoy Somos Más.

During their musical career the band shared stage with national known acts like Deny, Coralies, En Nuestros Corazones, Valor Interior and Mi Ultima Solucion several times as well with international bands like August Burns Red and We Came as Romans.

In January 2015 the band announced working on their follow-up for Dejando el Ayer which was released on September 20, 2015 via Pinhead Records. The album title is Como Un Oceano. On August 11, 2015 the band released the first song from the new record entitled El Final de Tus Palabras. The first official single release was Ayudame a Salir along with a music video. All for Love surprisingly announced their break-up on September 30, 2017 with their last show to be played on November 25, the same year.

== Musical style ==
The music of All for Love can be described as post-hardcore or a melodic version of metalcore with shouted verses and clean sung refrains. The lyrics, which are written completely in Spanish, are dealing social problems, broken relationships and their beliefs in god. The music is comparable with We Came as Romans, Crown The Empire and Upon This Dawning.

== Discography ==
=== Albums ===
- 2013: Dejando el Ayer (Pinhead Records)
- 2015: Como Un Oceano (Pinhead Records)

=== Music Videos ===
- 2014: Cuando Alguien Se Nos Va
- 2014: Hoy Somos Más
- 2015: Ayudame a Salir
