= Maxee =

Guyanese singer–songwriter (1969–2015)

- Maxwell in 2001
- Born: Charmayne Maxena Maxwell; January 11, 1969; Guyana
- Died: February 28, 2015 (aged 46); Los Angeles, California, U.S.
- Occupations: Singer; songwriter
- Children: 1
- Musical career
- Genres: Pop; R&B; urban adult contemporary
- Instrument: Vocals
- Years active: 1994–2015
- Formerly of: Brownstone

Charmayne Maxena Maxwell (January 11, 1969 – February 28, 2015), professionally known as Maxee, was a Guyana-born American singer and songwriter. In the mid-1990s, Maxwell came to prominence as a member of the female R&B trio Brownstone.

== Career ==
Maxwell found fame in the mid-1990s after she formed the group Brownstone with singers Monica "Mimi" Doby and Nicci Gilbert. After an a cappella audition, the trio were signed to Michael Jackson's Epic Records-distributed imprint, MJJ Music. The group released their debut album From the Bottom Up in 1995 which earned a platinum certification from the Recording Industry Association of America (RIAA) and received a Grammy Award nomination for Best R&B Performance by a Duo or Group with Vocals for their top ten hit single "If You Love Me". After going through the first of a few lineup switches and the release of their commercially less successful second album Still Climbing (1997), the trio disbanded.

Following the disbandment of Brownstone, Maxwell moved to London and signed with Mercury Records in 2000 to pursue a solo career. Her solo debut single "When I Look into Your Eyes" spawned a remix by producer Fred Jerkins III and peaked at number 55 on the UK Singles Chart. Follow-up "This Is Where I Wanna Be" failed to chart. Its commercial underperformance led to the cancellation of Maxwell's same-titled solo album.

== Personal life ==
Maxwell was married to Danish record producer Carsten Schack from duo Soulshock and Karlin. The couple had a son, Nicholas Hojer.

== Death ==
On February 28, 2015, Maxwell died after an accident in Los Angeles. She was at her home when she fell and cut her throat on a drinking glass that shattered during the fall. She died shortly afterwards in a hospital, aged 46.

== Discography ==
=== Singles ===
Year	Single	Peak chart positions			Album
Year	Single	US	US R&B	UK	Album
2001	"When I Look into Your Eyes"	—	—	55	Non-album singles
2001	"This Is Where I Wanna Be"	—	—	—	Non-album singles
"—" denotes a recording that did not chart or was not released in that territory.
