= En Nuestros Corazones =

Argentine metalcore band

- Origin: Buenos Aires, Argentina
- Genres: Metalcore, post hardcore, electronicore
- Years active: 2010–present
- Label: Vegan
- Members: Julio Bellver; Tobias Gomez Antolini; Mauro Castro; Federico E. Ramirez; Luis Molina
- Past members: Nicolás Figueroa; Ariel Menta
- Website: Official Facebook

En Nuestros Corazones (In Our Hearts) is an Argentine metalcore band formed in Buenos Aires in October 2010.

== History ==
=== 2010: Formation ===
The band was formed as a studio project by Nicolás Figueroa and Tobias Gomez Antolini in Buenos Aires in October 2010. The other band members joined the band later. Today the group consists of Julio Bellver (screamings), Federico E. Ramirez (guitar), Mauro Castro (guitar, samples), Luis Molina (bass guitar) and Tobias Gomez Antolini (drums). Tobias Gomez is the brother of Nazareno Gomez, the lead vocalist of Argentine's post hardcore band DENY. Figueroa left band. Luis Molina became the new bass player after Ariel Menta (bass guitar) left the band in 2013.

Since their inception the band has shared stage with national well-known acts like DENY, Dar Sangre, Cenizas, Coralies Last Kiss, Winter of Summer, Mi Ultima Solucion and All For Love as well with international bands like Silverstein and Parkway Drive.

=== 2011-today: Un niño murió aquella noche ===
En Nuestros Corazones is currently signed to the Argentine independent record label Vegan Records. The group released their debut full-length album Un niño murió aquella noche on September 16, 2012, in Argentina. The album was recorded at Infire Studios based in Palermo and was produced by Javier Casas who also worked for national upcoming and famous artists like Melian, Nueva Ética, Mostomalta and DENY. Casas is bassist of Nueva Ética also.

Joaquin Ortega (DENY), Gerardo Villalobos (Mostomalta) and Nazareno Gomez (DENY) are featured as guest vocalists on this album. The band shot a music video for their song Pesadillas which was directed by Nicolás Figueroa, one of the original founding members. A second music video was produced for their song Entre las Sombras. The official release party was held at Salon Pueyrredon in Buenos Aires. On March 24, 2013, the band presented their album in Northern Buenos Aires while a concert with Valor Interior.

The band is participated at Ringrocker Bandcontest where the five finalists will play a show on May 25, 2013, at Matrix in Bochum. The winner will play a 30-minutes set as newcomer at Rock am Ring festival 2013. The band peaked on 44th place in round 2. The first round the band peaked on 28th place. En Nuestros Corazones plan to enter the studio in early 2014 to record the follow-up album for Un niño murió aquella noche.

== Musical style ==
En Nuestros Corazones plays Post hardcore which is influenced by Metalcore. The band use electronic samples in their music as well so it can be described as Electronicore. All songs are written in Spanish language. Their music is influenced by bands like Attack Attack!, For the Fallen Dreams, Parkway Drive, My Ticket Home, Like Moths to Flames, DENY and Melian.

Their debut album Un niño murió aquella noche which is translated A Kid Died That Night is a concept album. The album's name is a metaphor describes the growing up from being a kid to an adult person.

== Discography ==
=== Albums ===
- 2012: Un niño murió aquella noche (Vegan Records)

=== Music videos ===
- Pesadillas (Nightmares)
- Entre las Sombras (Among the Shadows)
