= Invencible (Deny album) =

Studio album by DENY
- Released: July 12, 2014
- Recorded: May 2014 – June 2014
- Studio: Infire Studios
- Genre: Metalcore, post hardcore, emo
- Length: 44 min 22 s
- Label: Pinhead
- Producer: Javier Casas

DENY chronology
Por Siempre (2013)	Invencible (2014)

Singles from Invencible
- 1. "Un Año Más" Released: November 26, 2013; 2. "Invencible" Released: July 2, 2014; 3. "La Traición" Released: July 4, 2014; 4. "Una Razón" Released: July 6, 2014

Invencible is the second studio album by Argentine post-hardcore band Deny which was released on July 12, 2014 through Pinhead Records. It will be available worldwide on iTunes and as CD.

== Background ==
On November 26, 2013 the band played the first new song called Un Año Más which may become a song on the new album. The band started pre-production with producer Javier Casas at Infire Studios in Palermo, Buenos Aires on February 5, 2014. In June it was revealed that the album is called Invincible and set for release on July 12, 2014. In the End of June the band and their label published the cover artwork. The second single called Invencible was officially released on July 2, 2014 via YouTube. Another song mentioned to be on the record is called Yo (span. for I or me).

== Concept ==
In an interview with Melodic Never Dies vocalist Nazareno Gomez stated that the concept of the lyrics and the album art is darker than on the previous two releases. The concept is about the four elements of alchemy.

== Track listing ==
All tracks are written by Nazareno Gomez Antolini

No.	Title	Length
1.	"Intro"	0:50
2.	"Guerra Tras Guerra"	4:38
3.	"Invencible"	4:15
4.	"La Traición"	3:40
5.	"Nunca Dejar Caer"	3:30
6.	"Tras Mis Pasos"	3:08
7.	"Una Razón"	3:28
8.	"Toulouse"	4:10
9.	"Yo"	3:54
10.	"Documento III"	3:42
11.	"Resistiendo Golpes"	4:28
12.	"Un Año Mas"	4:39
Total length:		44:22
