= Por Siempre (Deny album) =

Live album by DENY
- Released: May 18, 2013
- Genre: Metalcore, post hardcore, emo
- Length: 56:06 (disc 1) / 63:47 (disc 2)
- Label: Pinhead
- Producer: Javier Casas

DENY chronology
Reino de Tormentas (2011)	Por Siempre (2013)	Invencible (2014)

Por Siempre is a double music DVD released on May 18, 2013, by Argentine post hardcore band DENY. It was released via Pinhead Records nationwide. A digital version is purchaseable at ITunes.

The material for the DVD was filmed on November 24, 2012, when the band played a show at Groove in Buenos Aires.

The first disc contains songs from previous album Reino de Tormentas (2011) and EP La Distancia (2009), the second disc contains Behind the Scenes material.

== Track listing ==
No.	Title	Length
1.	"Lo Que Siempre Buscabámos"	4:26
2.	"Reino de Tormentas"	3:44
3.	"Quebrando Promesas"	3:29
4.	"Caminos"	3:56
5.	"Alien vs. DENY"	3:30
6.	"La Distancia"	3:55
7.	"Documento No. 1"	4:25
8.	"Documento No. 2"	4:03
9.	"Si Pudiera Salvarte"	4:47
10.	"Ahogandome"	2:49
11.	"De Mi Pasado"	3:32
12.	"F.A.B.A."	3:35
13.	"La Última Vez"	5:38
14.	"E.X.E"	4:02
Total length:		56:06

== Personnel ==
DENY

- Nazareno Gomez Antolini – Screamed vocals
- Joaquín Ortega – guitars, Clean vocals
- Mateo Sevillano – guitars
- Juan Pablo Uberti – bass guitar, clean vocals
- Agustín Dupuis – drums

Production

- Produced, mixed and mastered by Javier Casas
- Cover artwork design by Alejandro Picardi
