= Luv (Tory Lanez song) =

Single by Tory Lanez

from the album I Told You
- Released: June 9, 2016
- Recorded: 2016
- Genre: Dancehall
- Length: 3:48 (single version); 3:01 (radio edit); 4:09 (album version)
- Label: Mad Love; Interscope
- Songwriters: Daystar Peterson; Benjamin Levin; Magnus Høiberg; Anthony Kelly; Mark Wolfe; Stephen Marsden; Wayne Passley
- Producers: Cashmere Cat; Benny Blanco

Tory Lanez singles chronology
"For Real" (2016)	"Luv" (2016)	"Trust Nobody" (2016)

Music video
- "Luv" on YouTube

"Luv" is a song by Canadian singer and rapper Tory Lanez. It was released on June 9, 2016, as the second single from his debut studio album, I Told You (2016). The song was produced by Cashmere Cat and Benny Blanco. It has interpolations from "Everyone Falls in Love" by Tanto Metro and Devonte. It received a nomination for Best R&B Song at the 59th Annual Grammy Awards that was held in February 2017.

== Music video ==
The music video for "Luv", directed by Lanez and Zac Facts, premiered via Lanez's Vevo channel on June 24, 2016.

== Remix ==
The official remix of the song was released on October 7, 2016, and features Jamaican dancehall artist Sean Paul. Another remix was made with German rapper Bonez MC.

== Chart performance ==
On the week of July 16, 2016, the song debuted at number 96 on the US Billboard Hot 100 chart and peaked at number 19 on the week of September 24, 2016. It became Tory Lanez' first song to reach the top 20 on the chart. The song spent 22 weeks on the chart.

In Canada, the song debuted at number 96 on the Canadian Hot 100 chart on the week of July 9, 2016. It peaked at number 28 on the chart. The song spent a total of 20 weeks on the chart. The single was eventually certified platinum by Music Canada for sales of over 80,000 units in Canada.

== Charts ==
=== Weekly charts ===
Chart (2016)	Peak position
Australia (ARIA)	83
Belgium (Ultratip Bubbling Under Flanders)	16
Belgium (Ultratip Bubbling Under Wallonia)	19
Canada Hot 100 (Billboard)	28
Czech Republic Airplay (ČNS IFPI)	68
Czech Republic Singles Digital (ČNS IFPI)	49
France (SNEP)	119
Ireland (IRMA)	69
Italy (FIMI)	95
Netherlands (Single Top 100)	52
New Zealand Heatseekers (Recorded Music NZ)	10
Portugal (AFP)	47
Scottish Singles Sales (Official Charts)	73
Slovakia Singles Digital (ČNS IFPI)	51
Sweden (Sverigetopplistan)	62
Switzerland (Schweizer Hitparade)	58
UK Singles (Official Charts)	47
US Billboard Hot 100	19
US Hot R&B/Hip-Hop Songs (Billboard)	4
US Pop Airplay (Billboard)	19
US Rhythmic Airplay (Billboard)	2

=== Year-end charts ===
Chart (2016)	Position
Canada (Canadian Hot 100)	82
US Billboard Hot 100	70
US Hot R&B/Hip-Hop Songs (Billboard)	22
US Rhythmic (Billboard)	12

== Certifications ==
Region	Certification	Certified units/sales
Canada (Music Canada)	Platinum	80,000^{‡}
Denmark (IFPI Danmark)	Gold	45,000^{‡}
France (SNEP)	Gold	100,000^{‡}
Germany (BVMI)	Gold	200,000^{‡}
Norway (IFPI Norway)	Gold	20,000^{‡}
United Kingdom (BPI)	Platinum	600,000^{‡}
United States (RIAA)	2× Platinum	2,000,000^{‡}
^{‡} Sales+streaming figures based on certification alone.
