= Deny (band) =

Argentine post-hardcore band

DENY
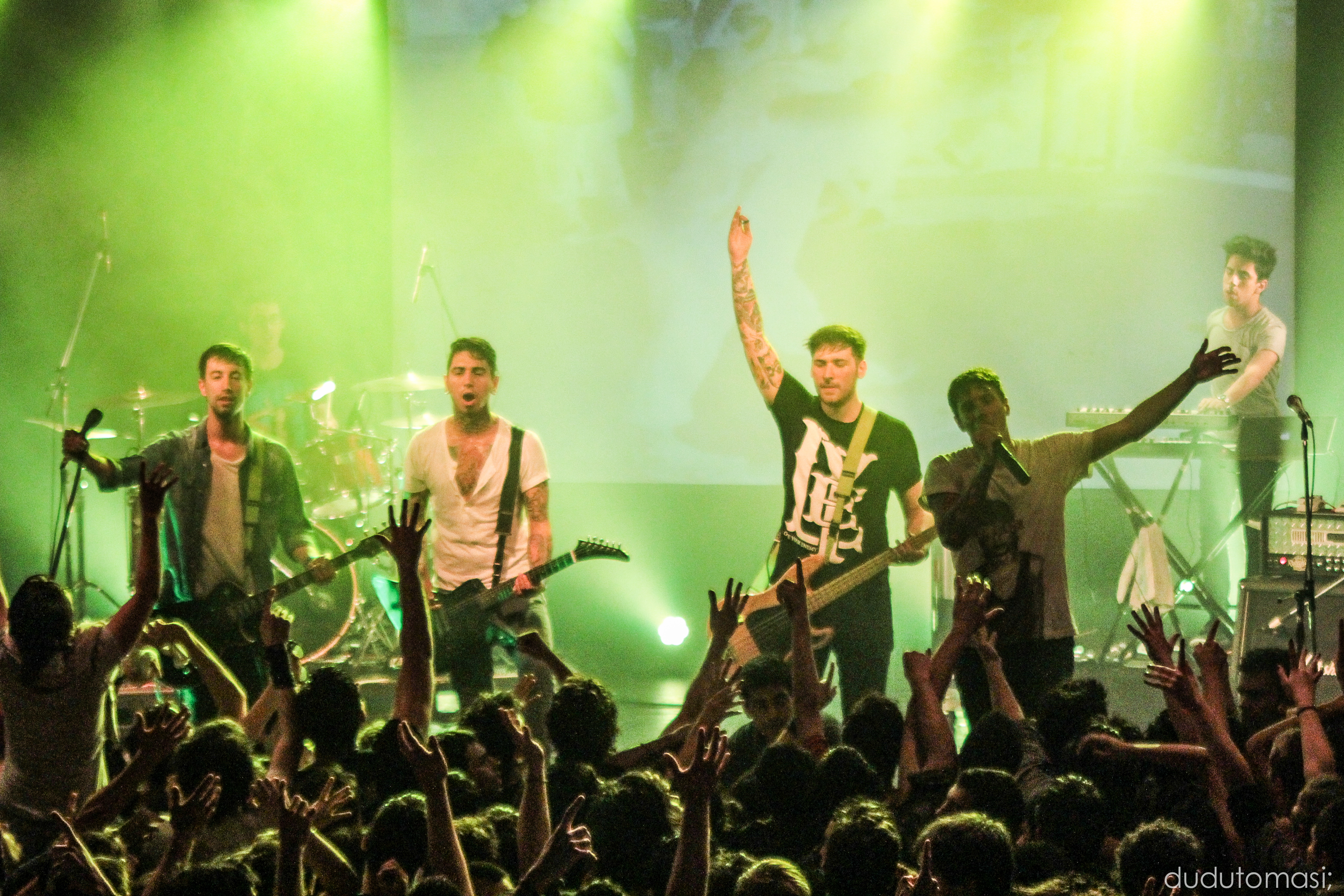
- DENY live at La Trastienda Club, Buenos Aires on May 13, 2012

Background information
- Origin: Buenos Aires, Argentina
- Genres: Post-hardcore, metalcore, electronicore
- Years active: 2007–2019
- Labels: Inmune, Pinhead
- Members: Nazareno Gomez; Joaquín Ortega; Mateo Sevillano; Juan Pablo Uberti; Agustín Dupuis
- Past members: Jonathan Perez
- Website: Official MySpace

Deny is an Argentine post-hardcore band based in Buenos Aires.

== History ==
=== 2007–2011 ===
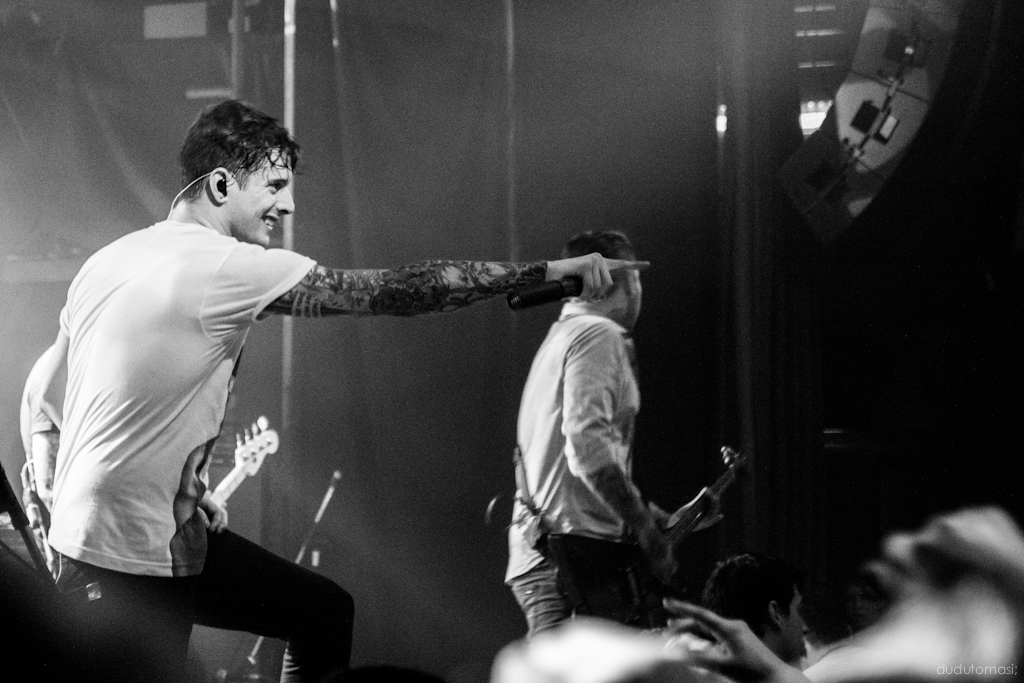
Nazareno Gomez (front) while a concert in Buenos Aires in 2012

DENY was formed in 2007 in Buenos Aires. The current line up of DENY consists of Nazareno Gomez (vocals), Joaquín Ortega (guitar, vocals), Mateo Sevillano (guitar), Juan Pablo Uberti (bass guitar, vocals), Agustín Dupuis (drums) and Jonathan Perez (keyboard).

DENY released their debut EP entitled La Distancia in 2009 via Inmune Records. The EP was recorded by Javier Casas of Argentine hardcore punk band Nueva Ética and Matias Espinoza the vocalist of Dar Sangre. The band shared stage with Silverstein and Alesana during the "Super Rock de Capital Federal" on February 11, 2009. DENY promoted their EP in the Buenos Aires area the rest of the year. In 2010 DENY played at "No Soy Rock". DENY played as opener for August Burns Red and Blessthefall at Roxy in Palermo on August 24, 2010.

=== 2011–2013: Reino de Tormentas ===
DENY was opener for A Day to Remember at the Teatro Colegiales in Buenos Aires on June 12, 2011. A Day to Remember played this show during their "What Separates Me from You Tour". The band recorded their debut album Reino de Tormentas after signing to Argentine punk label Pinhead Records (Tierra Santa, Boikot, Reincidentes and Todos Tus Muertos). “Reino de Tormentas” was released on September 23, 2011. DENY played two shows in Chile on October 15 and 16, 2011 in Valparaíso and Santiago de Chile together with Admira mi Desastre. DENY played shows together with Blessthefall and August Burns Red.

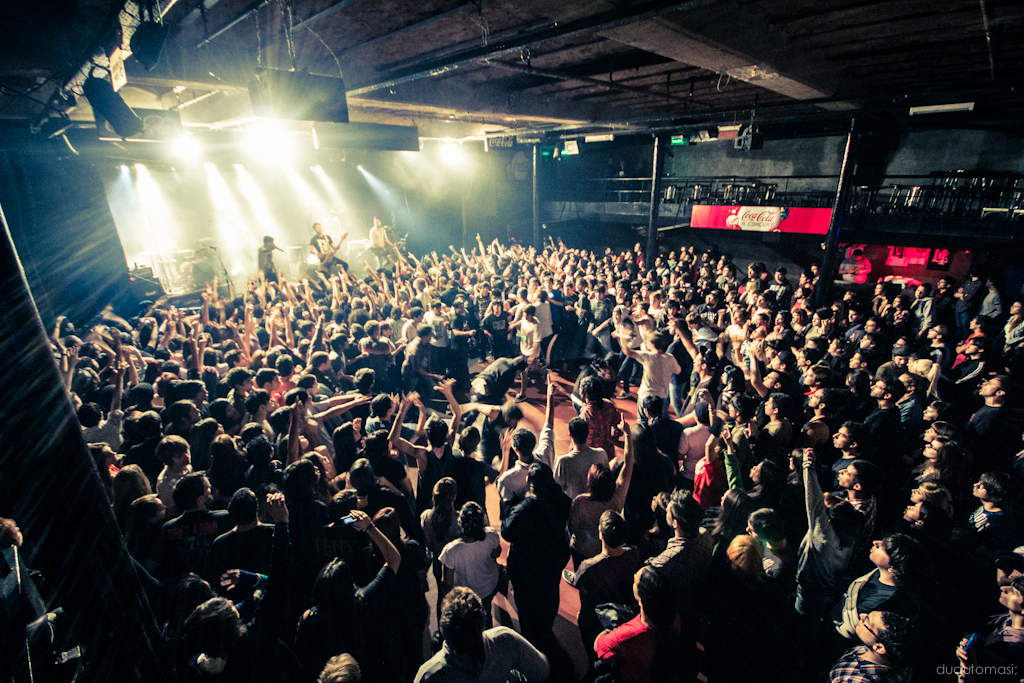
DENY live 2012

The debut EP “La Distancia” was re-released through Pinhead Records on February 24, 2012. The re-release version of the EP contains two bonus tracks. DENY will share stage with well-known Argentine punk band Attaque 77 on the “Resistance Tour” which is organized by Pinhead Records and Gonna Go. DENY celebrated the bands 5 year activity at La Trastienda Club together with Carajo on May 13, 2012.

On September 13, 2012 DENY will be opener for Memphis May Fire alongside Mi Última Solucion at Asbury Rock in Rivadavia, Buenos Aires. The band played a show in Santiago de Chile at Monster Rock Fest together with Valor Interior as co-headliner and several local bands like Drop the Gun, Admira mi Desastre, Sophia the Ocean, Divide y Conquista, and Incomarose. The band played two shows in Uruguay on October 11 and 12, 2012. The concerts were in Maldonado and Montevideo. This was the first appearance of DENY in Uruguay. DENY released the second music video on September 4, 2012. The video contains filmed material from their gigs in Mar del Plata and Buenos Aires while performing live at the Resistance Tour.

=== 2013–today: Por Siempre and Invencible ===
On April 23, 2013 the band played a gig for the Resistance Tour in Temperley with Cirse and Bulldog. On March 23, 2013 the band announced that a DVD entitled Por Siempre (engl. Forever) filmed at Groove in November 2012 was up to release on May 18, 2013 via Pinhead Records. A physical version was released in Argentina only but the rest of the world are able to get the release digitally on iTunes. The band stated that they started writing new material for their upcoming album which is set to be released later. The group played a release show at La Trastienda Club in Buenos Aires on release day.

The band toured Argentina to promote the new record. The group played shows in Campana, Cordoba, Tucumán and Rosario. The band also played a gig at three-day festival Innovafest which was held in Quilmes. In October the band is set to tour Brazil for the first time. DENY will play three shows. One of these shows is at the Sampa Music Festival in São Paulo. São Paulo based rock band Every Man Is an Island will support the band during that tour. On December 8, 2013 the band performed a set in television called Quiero Musica en mi Idioma for the series Q-News. Two weeks before this the band performed a new song called Un Año Más.

The band started pre-production for the new album on February 5, 2014. While working on the new album the musicians played a few gigs in the Buenos Aires area. The new album is set to be released on July 12, 2014. The album is called Invencible. On June 8, 2014 DENY performed at the Ciudad Emergente a music, film and arts festival in Buenos Aires which was visited by more than 250,000 spectators overall.

== Musical style ==
DENY play a Metalcore and Screamo-influenced style of Post hardcore. The band calls Alexisonfire and Underoath as such as Bad Religion and Pennywise to their musical influences. In some songs the band use Electronic music in their songs. Except 3 songs all songs are written in Spanish language. In some songs the band's music is influenced by Alternative rock also.

== Members ==
Current members

- Nazareno Gomez – lead vocals
- Joaquín Ortega – clean vocals, rhythm guitar
- Juan Pablo Uberti – bass, backing vocals
- Agustín Dupuis – drums, percussion

Past members

- Jonathan Pérez – keyboards, synthesizers, programming
- Agustín Abelenda – keyboards, synthesizers, programming
- Mateo Sevillano – lead guitar

== Discography ==
=== EPs & Albums ===
Year	Album	Label	Chart positions	Sales (national / international)
Year	Album	Label	AR	Sales (national / international)
2009	La Distancia (EP)	Inmune/Pinhead	—	n.A. / n.A.
2011	Reino de Tormentas	Pinhead	—	n.A. / n.A.
2013	Por Siempre (DVD)	Pinhead	—	n.A. / n.A.
2014	Invencible	Pinhead	—	n.A. / n.A.
"—" denotes a release that did not chart.

=== Singles ===
Year	Title	Album
2012	"Si Pudiera Salvarte"	Reino de Tormentas
2012	"E.X.E"	Reino de Tormentas
2012	"Lo Que Siempre Buscabámos"	Reino de Tormentas
