= 5 Miles to Empty =

1997 single by Brownstone

Single by Brownstone

from the album Still Climbing
- Released: May 5, 1997
- Length: 5:11 (album version); 3:45 (radio edit)
- Label: MJJ Music
- Songwriter(s): Big Yam; Nichole Gilbert; Victor Merritt; Jon B.
- Producer(s): Big Yam; Victor Merritt

Brownstone singles chronology
"I Can't Tell You Why" (1995)	"5 Miles to Empty" (1997)	"Kiss and Tell" (1997)

"5 Miles to Empty" is a song by American R&B vocal group Brownstone from their second album, Still Climbing (1997). Released as a single on May 5, 1997, the song reached number 39 on the US Billboard Hot 100 and number six on the Billboard Hot R&B Singles chart. It also charted at number 12 on the UK Singles Chart and number five in New Zealand.

== Critical reception ==
Bob Jones of Muzik Magazine gave the single an 8/10 and highlighted their vocal performance as well as the song's production.

== Formats and track listings ==
CD single

1. "5 Miles to Empty" (Radio Edit) – 3:45
2. "5 Miles to Empty" (Cutfather & Joe Remix Up) – 4:19
3. "5 Miles to Empty" (Cutfather & Joe Remix Smooth) – 4:12
4. "5 Miles to Empty" (Do Me Remix) – 4:38
5. "5 Miles to Empty" (Dark Child Remix) – 4:11

12-inch maxi

1. "5 Miles to Empty" (Cutfather & Joe Remix Up) – 4:19
2. "5 Miles to Empty" (Cutfather & Joe Remix Smooth) – 4:12
3. "5 Miles to Empty" (Radio Edit) – 3:45
4. "5 Miles to Empty" (Do Me Remix) – 4:38
5. "5 Miles to Empty" (Dark Child Remix) – 4:11

CD maxi

1. "5 Miles to Empty" (Radio Edit) – 3:45
2. "5 Miles to Empty" (Cutfather & Joe Remix Up) – 4:19
3. "5 Miles to Empty" (Cutfather & Joe Remix Smooth) – 4:12
4. "5 Miles to Empty" (Do Me Remix) – 4:38
5. "5 Miles to Empty" (Dark Child Remix) – 4:11

CD maxi – Remixes

1. "5 Miles to Empty" (Dark Child Remix) – 4:11
2. "5 Miles to Empty" (Do Me Remix) – 4:38
3. "5 Miles to Empty" (Dark Child Instrumental) – 4:11
4. "5 Miles to Empty" (Do Me Instrumental) – 4:38
5. "5 Miles to Empty" (Album Version) – 5:11

== Charts ==
=== Weekly charts ===
Chart (1997)	Peak position
Europe (Eurochart Hot 100)	82
New Zealand (Recorded Music NZ)	5
Scotland (OCC)	54
UK Singles (OCC)	12
UK Hip Hop/R&B (OCC)	2
US Billboard Hot 100	39
US Dance Club Songs (Billboard)	38
US Dance Singles Sales (Billboard)	24
US Hot R&B/Hip-Hop Songs (Billboard)	6
US Rhythmic (Billboard)	39

=== Year-end charts ===
Chart (1997)	Position
US Hot R&B Singles (Billboard)	44

== Release history ==
Region	Date	Format(s)	Label(s)	Ref.
United States	April 22, 1997	Rhythmic contemporary radio	MJJ Music; Work	
United Kingdom	May 5, 1997	CD; cassette	MJJ Music; Epic	
Japan	May 8, 1997	CD	MJJ Music; Epic	
