= Still Climbing (Brownstone album) =

Studio album by Brownstone
- Released: June 23, 1997
- Recorded: 1996–1997
- Length: 58:03
- Label: MJJ; Work
- Producer: Jerry Greenberg (exec.); Jono Kohan (exec.); Michael Jackson (exec.); Rodney Jerkins; Gerald "Big Yam" Baillergeau; Victor Merritt; Dave Hall; Sean Hall; Herb Middleton; Soulshock & Karlin; Tricky Stewart; Robin Thicke

Brownstone chronology
From the Bottom Up (1995)	Still Climbing (1997)	All for Love (2000)

Singles from Still Climbing
- 1. "5 Miles to Empty" Released: May 5, 1997; 2. "Kiss and Tell" Released: 1997; 3. "In the Game of Love" Released: 1997

Still Climbing is the second and final studio album released by American R&B trio Brownstone. It was released by MJJ Music and the Work Group on June 23, 1997 in the United States. The album contains the second line-up of the group after the departure of original member Monica Doby. She was replaced by Kina Cosper, whose first and only appearance was on this album before departing for a solo career in 2000. Still Climbing features the singles "5 Miles to Empty" and "Kiss and Tell" as well as "In the Game of Love" which originally appeared on the soundtrack to the 1996 film The First Wives Club.

== Production ==
In early 1995, the R&B group Brownstone underwent significant lineup changes following the departure of Monica "Mimi" Doby due to a persistent bronchial infection. This departure came at a crucial time, as the group's debut album, From The Bottom Up, had garnered considerable attention and was being actively promoted, particularly through the single "Grapevyne." The timing of Doby's exit posed challenges for the group, which was in the midst of a promotional tour. To address the vacancy, Brownstone recruited Kina Cosper, a former college acquaintance of group member Nicci Gilbert.

The band began recording their second studio album, Still Climbing, in January 1996. During this period, Brownstone faced considerable pressure from their record label. The album's production involved collaboration with several new producers and songwriters, including notable figures such as Rodney Jerkins and Robin Thicke.

== Critical reception ==
Professional ratings
Review scores
Source	Rating
AllMusic	3/5 stars
USA Today	2.5/4 stars

In his review for Allmusic, senior editor Stephen Thomas Erlewine wrote that Still Climbing "suffers from the same inconsistent songwriting that plagued their debut From the Bottom Up, yet that isn't a fatal flaw. There are as many strong singles on Still Climbing as on the debut, and Brownstone sounds stronger and more confident on the record, making it an enjoyable, if tentative, step forward." USA Today critic Steve Jones wrote that Still Climbing was "a solid follow-up" that continued their focus on "smooth ballads," with "5 Miles to Empty" typifying their sound through "soulful choruses," and noted that "slow jams far outnumber the handful of sparkless uptempo tunes."

== Track listing ==
No.	Title	Writer(s)	Producer(s)	Length
1.	"Let's Get It Started"	Nichole Gilbert; Charmayne Maxwell; Herman Kelly; Kina Cosper; Rodney Jerkins	Jerkins	4:51
2.	"5 Miles to Empty"	Gilbert; Gerald Baillergeau; Victor Merritt	Baillergeau; Merritt	5:11
3.	"Love Me Like You Do"	Gilbert; Jerkins; Dwayne Barnes	Hall	4:31
4.	"In the Game of Love"	Gordon Chambers; Rich Stroud; Kelvin Anderson	Dave Hall; Stroud^{[a]}; Anderson^{[a]}	4:44
5.	"Foolish Pride"	Gilbert; Carsten Schack	Soulshock & Karlin	5:21
6.	"Kiss and Tell"	Gilbert; Baillergeau; Merritt	Baillergeau; Merritt	4:45
7.	"Baby Love"	N. Gilbert; Baillergeau	Baillergeau; Merritt	4:58
8.	"Around You"	Robin Thicke	Thicke; Gerry Brown^{[a]}	4:50
9.	"Revenge"	Maxwell; Shawn Stockman; Schack; Kenneth Karlin	Soulshock & Karlin	4:59
10.	"All I Do"	Christopher A. Stewart; Sean Hall; Derek Sochacki; Bridget Cooper	Tricky Stewart; S. Hall	4:21
11.	"You Give Good Love"	Gilbert; Herb Middleton	Middleton	4:57
12.	"If You Play Your Cards Right"	Kevin McCord	Gilbert; Bruce Sterling^{[a]}	4:35

Japan bonus track
No.	Title	Length
13.	"I'm Not Her"	4:41

Notes

- ^{^a} denotes co-producer

Samples

- "Let's Get It Started" contains a sample from "Dance to the Drummer's Beat" as performed by Herman Kelly and Life.
- "Love Me Like You Do" contains a sample from "A Love of Your Own" as performed by Average White Band.
- "Foolish Pride" contains elements from the recording "La La for Love".

== Personnel ==
- Keyboards and drum programming: Rodney Jerkins, Soulshock & Karlin, Big Yam & Victor Merritt, Tricky & Sean, Herb Middleton, Robin Thicke
- Guitar: John "Jubu" Smith
- Executive producer: Michael Jackson, Jerry Greenberg, Jono Kahan
- Mastering: Alan Yoshida
- Photography: Albert Sanchez
- Design: Gabrielle Raumberger, Clifford Singontiko

== Charts ==
Chart (1997)	Peak position
Dutch Albums (Album Top 100)	73
UK Albums (OCC)	19
UK R&B Albums (OCC)	2
US Billboard 200	51
US Top R&B/Hip-Hop Albums (Billboard)	16
