= Kina (album) =

Studio album by Kina
- Released: July 18, 2000
- Genre: Rock; hip hop
- Length: 56:19
- Label: DreamWorks
- Producer: London Jones; Tim Feehan; Kina

Singles from Kina
- 1. "Girl from the Gutter" Released: June 6, 2000; 2. "Me" Released: 2000

Kina (stylized in all caps) is the only studio album by American singer Kina. It was released on July 18, 2000, through DreamWorks Records.

== Track listing ==
Kina – Standard edition
No.	Title	Writer(s)	Producer(s)	Length
1.	"Girl from the Gutter"	Kina Cosper; London Jones; Robert Howes	Jones	4:47
2.	"I Love You"	Cosper; Jones	Jones	4:05
3.	"Have a Cry"	Cosper; James Macon	Jones	4:25
4.	"Stop"	Cosper; Jones	Jones	4:13
5.	"Give and Take"	Cosper; Jones; Simeon Spiegel	Jones	5:08
6.	"Me"	Cosper; Tim Feehan; Gene Black	Feehan	4:36
7.	"U Don't Know"	Cosper; Jones; Howes	Jones	4:02
8.	"Loser"	Cosper; Jones	Jones	4:19
9.	"Hurt So Bad"	Cosper	Cosper	3:49
10.	"Insanity"	Cosper; Jones	Jones	5:11
11.	"Still Here" (contains hidden track "Dark Cloud")	Cosper; Jones	Jones	12:28
Total length:				56:19

Kina – Japanese edition (bonus track)
No.	Title	Writer(s)	Producer(s)	Length
12.	"Gotta Go"	Cosper; Jones	Jones	3:36
Total length:				59:55
