= Distancia (José José album) =

Studio album by José José
- Released: June 30, 1998
- Label: RCA
- Producer: Roberto Livi; Arrangers; Ricardo Eddy Martinez & Julian Navarro

José José chronology
| Y algo más (1998) | Distancia (1998) | Tenampa (2001) |

Distancia (Distance) is a 1998 album by José José for BMG. The album went triple-gold. The main single was "Ojalá que te mueras”. Livi had already worked with the singer 1992 on "40 y 20" and two hit albums, as well as Mujeriego 1995.

== Track listing ==
1. "La llamaban María"
2. "Triste tarde gris"
3. "Distancia"
4. "Cariño"
5. "No hay otro remedio" (Roberto Livi/J. Madeira)
6. "Ojalá qué te mueras"
7. "Amar sin ser amado"
8. "Sin ti"
9. "Cómo duele"
