= La Distancia (EP) =

EP by DENY
- Released: February 2009; February 24, 2012 (re-issue)
- Genre: Metalcore; Post hardcore Emo
- Length: 22:36 (2009); 29:37 (2012)
- Label: Pinhead, Inmune Records
- Producer: Javier Casas

DENY chronology
La Distancia (2009)	Reino de Tormentas (2011)

La Distancia (translated: The Distance) is the debut EP of Argentine Post hardcore act Deny originally released in 2009 via Inmune Records. The EP was re-released on February 24, 2012, via Pinhead Records. The re-issue contains two acoustic versions of E.X.E and Lo Que Siempre Buscabámos from the debut album Reino de Tormentas. Both issues were produced by Nueva Ética guitarist Javier Casas at Infire Studios.

With the re-release of La Distancia with two bonus tracks, fans of DENY and the musicians themselves describe La Distancia as their official second album.

== Track list ==
No.	Title	Length
1.	"Intro"	1:09
2.	"F.A.B.A"	3:08
3.	"Quebrando Promesas"	3:03
4.	"HTML.INTRLD"	1:32
5.	"La Distancia"	3:40
6.	"Catarsis"	3:20
7.	"Documento No. 1"	3:47
8.	"Ahogandome"	2:53
9.	"E.X.E (Acoustic) (Re-issue bonus track)"	3:23
10.	"Lo Que Siempre Buscabámos (acoustic) (Re-issue bonus track)"	3:37

== Personnel ==
Deny

- Nazareno Gomez Antolini – screamed vocals
- Joaquín Ortega – guitars, clean vocals
- Mateo Sevillano – lead guitars
- Juan Pablo Uberti – bass guitar, clean vocals
- Agustín Dupuis – drums

Production

- Produced, mixed and mastered by Javier Casas
