= José Mármol, Buenos Aires =

City in Greater Buenos Aires, Argentina

Coordinates: 34°47′S 58°22′W

José Marmol is a city in Greater Buenos Aires, Argentina, located 25 km south of Buenos Aires. It belongs to the Almirante Brown Partido (district). It has 5.14 km^{2}, thus occupying 3.97% of the district. Its population was 40,612 inhabitants (INDEC, 2001), grew 4.6% from the 38,842 inhabitants (INDEC 1991) of the previous census, population density of 7,091 inhabitants / km ². In 1991 19.037 men and 19.805 women were counted, according to the 1991 national census. In that year there was also determined 11,290 homes.
