= From the Bottom Up =

Studio album by Brownstone
- Released: January 10, 1995
- Length: 57:25
- Labels: Epic; MJJ
- Producers: Jerry L. Greenberg (exec.); Michael Jackson (exec.); Gerald Baillergeau; Dewey Browder; Gordon Chambers; Jorge Corante; Charles Farrar; Dave Hall; Jonah; Ken Kessie; John Myles O'Brien; Soulshock & Karlin; Troy Taylor; Darin Whittington

Brownstone chronology
From the Bottom Up (1995)	Still Climbing (1997)

Singles from From the Bottom Up
- 1. "Pass the Lovin'" Released: August 23, 1994; 2. "If You Love Me" Released: October 24, 1994; 3. "Grapevyne" Released: April 11, 1995; 4. "I Can't Tell You Why" Released: July 25, 1995

From the Bottom Up is the debut studio album by American girl group Brownstone. It was released by Epic Records and Michael Jackson's MJJ Music on January 10, 1995, in the United States. Brownstone worked with a wide range of producers and songwriters on the album, including Jorge Corante, Dave "Jam" Hall, Soulshock & Karlin, and Gordon Chambers. From the Bottom Up spawned four singles, including the top 10 R&B hits "If You Love Me" and "Grapevyne," and a cover of The Eagles' "I Can't Tell You Why". In addition, "Sometimes Dancin'" was featured in the Free Willy 2: The Adventure Home soundtrack.

The album debuted at number 48 on the US Billboard 200 and peaked at number 29 on March 11, 1995. It spent 37 consecutive weeks on the chart and earned a platinum certification from the Recording Industry Association of America (RIAA) on August 16, 1995. From the Bottom Up received critical acclaim and garnered several accolades, including a Grammy Award nomination for Best R&B Performance by a Duo or Group with Vocals for "If You Love Me," and five Billboard Music Award nominations, winning one for Top Hot R&B Single Airplay for "If You Love Me."

== Promotion ==
To promote the album, Brownstone embarked on a concert tour throughout the United States during the summer of 1995, performing at various venues such as the House of Blues in North Hollywood, California, and participating in festivals like Jam 4 Peace in Milwaukee, Budweiser Superfest in Chicago, KUBE Summer Jam in Quincy, Washington, and the Cincinnati Jazz Festival.

The trio also made appearances on several local and international television programs such as The Tonight Show with Jay Leno, Video Soul, Top of the Pop, and Hey Hey Its Saturday.

== Critical reception ==
Professional ratings
Review scores
Source	Rating
AllMusic	3/5 stars
Entertainment Weekly	B−
Knoxville News Sentinel	2.5/5 stars
Los Angeles Times	3/4 stars
Mademoiselle	4/4 stars
Music Week	3/5 stars
The Washington Post	(favorable)

Upon its release the album received positive reviews from critics. William Cooper from AllMusic called From the Bottom Up a "solid debut." He found that the album "showcases the group's considerable vocal talents, but Brownstone is somewhat distinctive in that the group's members also had a hand in writing their own material. Predictably, the album's songs alternate between R&B funk workouts and slinky slow jams, but the vocals rise above the material, making the album a delightful listen [...] From the Bottom Up is somewhat undermined by an overabundance of producers. But this doesn't take away from the quality of the songs and the solid vocal performances."

== Track listing ==
No.	Title	Writer(s)	Producer(s)	Length
1.	"Party wit Me"	Nichole Gilbert; Jorge Corante	Corante; N. Gilbert	4:44
2.	"Grapevyne"	Andrea Gilbert; N. Gilbert; Dave "Jam" Hall	Hall	5:39
3.	"If You Love Me"	Gordon Chambers; N. Gilbert; Hall; Erick Sermon; Kevin Madison; Parrish Smith	Hall	5:04
4.	"Sometimes Dancin'"	Lloyd James; N. Gilbert; Jonah; John O'Brien; Carsten Schack; Kenneth Karlin	Soulshock & Karlin	5:03
5.	"I Can't Tell You Why"	Timothy B. Schmit; Glenn Frey; Don Henley	Charles Farrar; Troy Taylor	4:06
6.	"Don't Cry for Me"	Brownstone; Darin Whittington	Whittington	5:21
7.	"Pass the Lovin'"	N. Gilbert; Whittington; Charmayne Maxwell	Ken Kessie	3:51
8.	"Fruit of Life"	Corante; N. Gilbert; Monica Doby	Corante; N. Gilbert	5:15
9.	"True to Me"	N. Gilbert; Jonah; O'Brien	N. Gilbert; Jonah; O'Brien	3:51
10.	"Wipe It Up"	N. Gilbert; Gerald Baillergeau; Ron Marlin; Doby; Maxwell	Baillergeau	3:25
11.	"Deeper Feelings (Ooh La La)"	N. Gilbert; Shawn Lilly; Dewey Browder; Maxwell	Dewey Browder	5:30
12.	"Half of You" (featuring Gordon Chambers)	N. Gilbert; Chambers	Chambers	5:42

Samples

- "If You Love Me" embodies portions of the composition "Spellbound" as performed by K-Solo.
- "Sometimes Dancin'" contains elements from "Kamazaki" as performed by Prince Jammy.

== Personnel ==
Adapted credits from the liner notes of From the Bottom Up.

- Alan Yoshida – mastering (A&M Mastering Studios)
- Jono Kohan – A&R (MJJ Music)
- Mary Mourer – art direction
- Doug Erp – design
- Warren Mantooth – photography
- Cheri Grey – front cover/logo design

== Charts ==
=== Weekly charts ===
Chart (1995)	Peak position
Australian Albums (ARIA)	19
Canada Top Albums/CDs (RPM)	40
Dutch Albums (Album Top 100)	14
German Albums (Offizielle Top 100)	91
New Zealand Albums (RMNZ)	25
UK Albums (Official Charts)	18
UK R&B Albums (Official Charts)	2
US Billboard 200	29
US Top R&B/Hip-Hop Albums (Billboard)	4

=== Year-end charts ===
Chart (1995)	Position
US Billboard 200	95
US Top R&B/Hip-Hop Albums (Billboard)	18

== Certifications ==
Region	Certification	Certified units/sales
United Kingdom (BPI)	Silver	60,000^{^}
United States (RIAA)	Platinum	1,000,000^{^}
^{^} Shipments figures based on certification alone.
