= Tanto Metro and Devonte =

Jamaican dancehall vocal duo

- Origin: Jamaica
- Genres: Dancehall
- Years active: 1996–present
- Labels: VP, Epic, Universal, Penthouse
- Members: Tanto Metro; Devonte

Tanto Metro and Devonte are the Jamaican dancehall vocal duo of deejay Tanto Metro and singer Devonte.

== History ==
Tanto Metro (born Mark Wolfe in Kingston, Jamaica) acquired his stage name from working on the Metromedia sound system. He moved on to become part of Patrick Roberts' Shocking Vibes organization and released the solo album Ratings in 1995 which featured guest appearances from Beenie Man and Dean Fraser. He subsequently established a working partnership with tenor-voiced singer Devonte (born Wayne Passley), and the duo had a major hit in Jamaica in 1997 with "Everyone Falls in Love", which was followed by an album of the same name produced by Donovan Germain for penthouse Records; The single and album also sold well in the United States and Canada (the album topped the Billboard Top Reggae Albums Chart and the single reached number 6 in the Canadian singles chart), leading to a deal with Epic Records. The duo were compared to the similar duo of Chaka Demus and Pliers.

The duo's second album, The Beat Goes On, was released in 2001 by VP Records in Jamaica and Universal in the US. The album reached number 4 on Billboard's Top Reggae Albums Chart in 2002. A single from the album, "Give It to Her", reached number 85 in the Billboard Hot 100. Beenie Man again guested and the duo repaid the compliment on his 2002 album Tropical Storm.

The duo released Musically Inclined in 2006, with a guest appearances from Courtney Melody and Morgan Heritage. A quiet period for the duo followed, although a compilation in VP/Greensleeves Most Wanted series was released in 2009. In 2008, Japanese musician Miliyah Kato released "Kono Mama Zutto Asa Made", a song that sampled "Everyone Falls in Love", which despite being a single B side became a hit in Japan, and was certified gold by the RIAJ.

They returned with the single "Already Know" in 2013, a Sly and Robbie-produced single. The album Request was scheduled to be released later that year but never did.

The album Sly and Robbie Presents Tanto Metro and Devonte followed in June 2015.

== Discography ==
=== Tanto Metro and Devonte ===
==== Albums ====
- Everyone Falls in Love (1997), VP/Epic/550 Music
- The Beat Goes On (2001), VP/Universal
- Musically Inclined (2006), VP
- Request (2013), Taxi
- Sly and Robbie Presents Tanto Metro and Devonte (2015), Taxi
- Shocking Vibes (2024)

Compilations

- Most Wanted (2009), VP

==== Singles ====
- "Everyone Falls in Love" (1997), VP/Epic/550 Music
- "Better Body" (1998), 2 Hard
- "Say Wooee" (1998), K.Licious
- "Go So" (1998), Greensleeves
- "She Gone" (1998), Greensleeves
- "How We Win Dem" (1998), Vibes House
- "Girls Ready" (1998), Penthouse
- "Feel Sen" (1998), Fat Eyes
- "Everyone Falls in Love" (1999), Penthouse
- "Front of the Line" (1999), Greensleeves
- "I Can't Get No Sleep" (1999), Stone Love
- "Long Time" (1999), Too Good
- "Call My Name" (1999), How Yu Fi Sey Dat? (with Mega Banton)
- "Promises" (1999), VP
- "Sensimelia" (1999), K.Licious
- "Aim for Your Goal" (1999), Penthouse
- "Talk Up Girl" (99 Mix) (1999), Crimes Production
- "Old Gangster Rule" (1999), Studio 2000
- "That Thing" (1999), K.Licious
- "Everyone Falls in Love" (1999), Relentless
- "Give It to Her" (2002)
- "Already Know", The Baker Productions
- "Teaser", VP

=== Tanto Metro solo ===
==== Albums ====
- Ratings (1995), VP
