= Carajo =

Argentine rock band

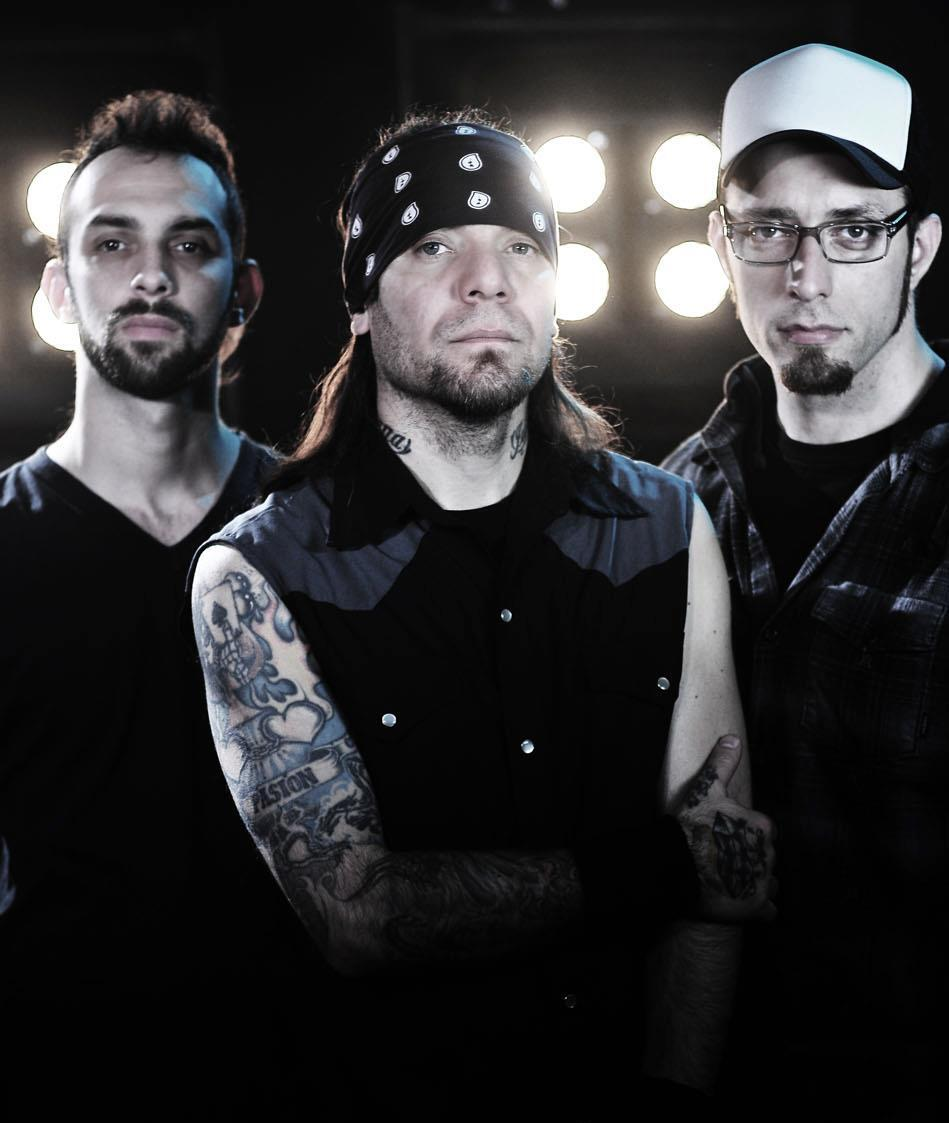
- Carajo in 2012

Background information
- Origin: Buenos Aires, Argentina
- Genres: Nu metal, alternative metal, groove metal, hardcore punk, punk rock, metalcore
- Years active: 2000–2020
- Members: Marcelo "Corvata" Corvalán; Hernán "Tery" Langer; Andrés "Andy" Vilanova

Carajo (Spanish: [kaˈɾaxo]; "Dick" or "Fuck!") was an Argentine rock band from Buenos Aires. It was formed in 2000 with Marcelo "Corvata" Corvalan on bass and vocals, Andres "Andy" Vilanova on drums and Hernan "Tery" Langer on guitar and backing vocals. The first two share the history of having been part of the band A.N.I.M.A.L. In 2020, the band's breakup was announced.

== History ==
The group's logo

Carajo was formed in 2000 with Corvata on bass and vocals, Andy on drums and Tery on guitar and backing vocals. Their first show was at "La Diabla" on 4 May with the band Ritual. They also played in neighboring Uruguay.

Their first album, Carajo, was recorded in 2002, and officially performed on 7 May at The Roxy in Buenos Aires. In November they played at Colombia's Rock al parque festival in front of 80,000 people. The band was named "Breakthrough Band of 2002" by the Argentine press.

In 2003, they played Cosquin Rock, one of the most important summer festivals in Argentina, before 14,000 people. The EP Carajografia was released and they were nominated for an MTV Latin America video music award for "Best New Artist".

2004 saw the release of their second full-length studio album, Atrapasueños (Dreamcatcher) and its successful presentation in front of 3000 people at Buenos Aires' "Republica Cromañon" (nearly a month before the tragedy at the same venue ended the life of 194 people during a Callejeros concert). This year also marked their first visit to Paraguay.

Carajo's first visit to Bolivia and Chile occurred in 2005. Due to an accident (Andy's broken wrist), important shows were cancelled, which resulted in the band experimenting with new sounds and musical styles. Months later, the band released Electrorroto Acustizado 2.1 (Acustified Electrobroken 2.1), a one-off show were they remade their own songs and played covers (Andy actually played the show, still with a cast on his forearm/hand).

In 2006, Carajo became the first Argentine rock band ever to play in Cuba. The band returned to Uruguay and visited Panama for the first time.

After many delays, the band's third studio album Inmundo was released in 2007. The DVD Formando Asi Cada Parte Del Todo (Thus Forming Each Part of the Everything) containing footage of their show at Arena Obras Sanitarias in November 2005, and from their trip to Cuba was postponed indefinitely after many delays in its release (apparently due to technical problems). The band's first visit to Venezuela was slated for mid-August.

Carajo's fourth studio album is titled El Mar De Las Almas (The Sea of Souls) was released on 23 September. The first single of the album is called "Acido" (Acid).

The band's first double album, Frente A Frente was released on 25 September 2013 and produced by Alejandro Vazquez.

On 12 August, the band released a documentary film/live album called Hoy Como Ayer, with new songs and a documentary that shows the 15 years of group's career.

== Discography ==
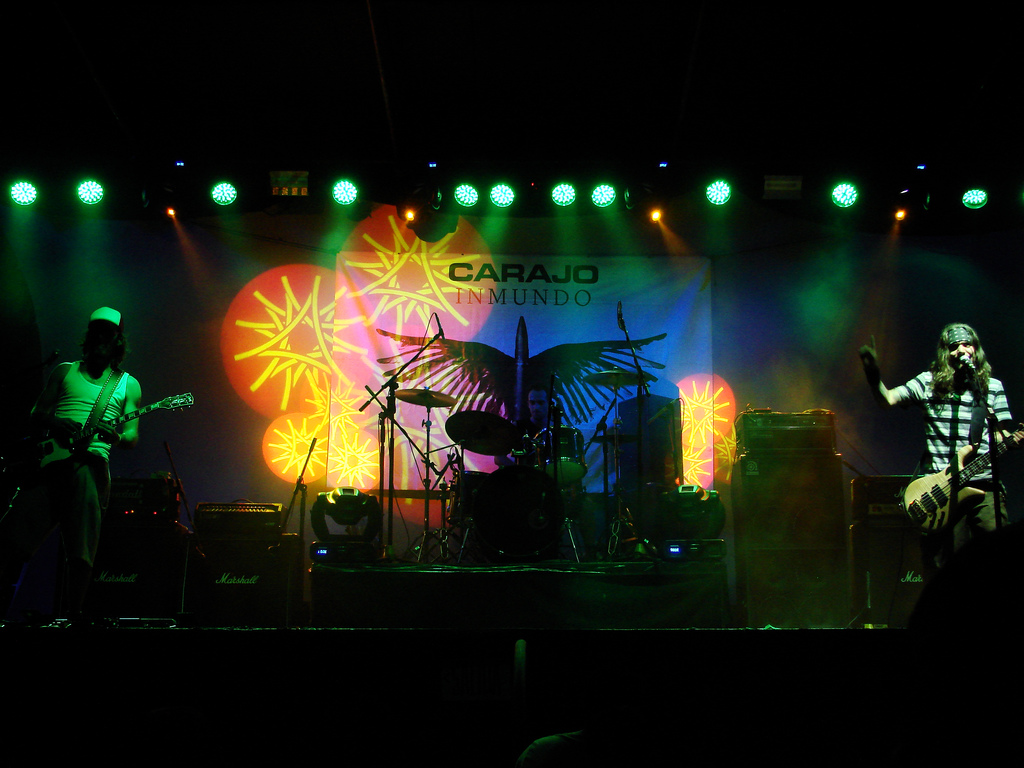
Carajo playing in Monterrey, Mexico

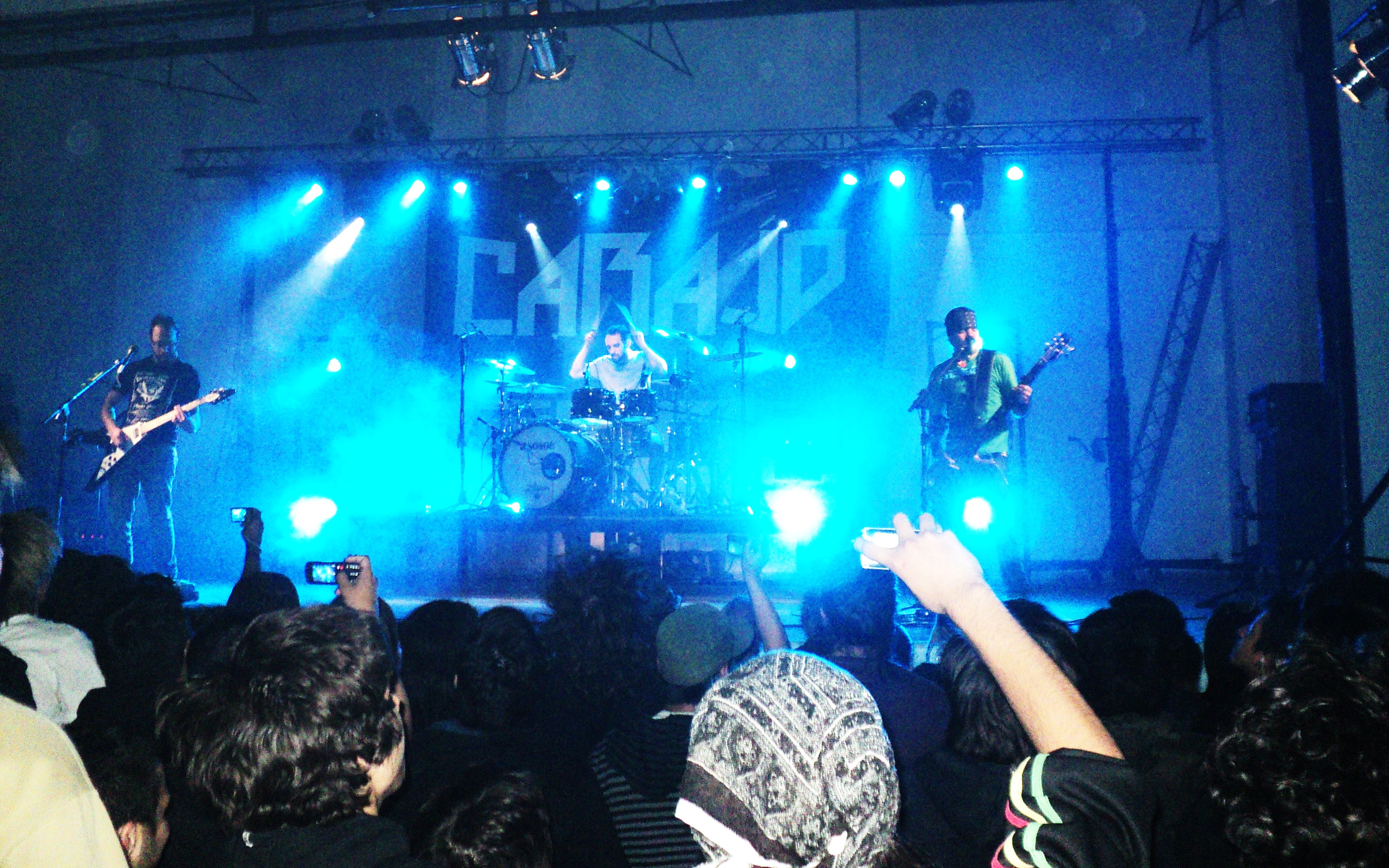
Carajo performing in 2011

=== Carajo ===
Edited in 2002 by Gua Gua Musica, distributed by Universal Music Argentina

1. Resistiendo Con Ideas (Resisting With Ideas)
2. Sacate La Mierda (Take Off Your Shit)
3. El Vago (The Bum)
4. La Parca (The Reaper)
5. Salvaje (Wild)
6. Noche (Night)
7. Ironía (Irony)
8. Pura Vida (Pure Life)
9. La Guerra Y La Paz (War And Peace)
10. Mal Popular (People's Ill)
11. Conquistador (Conqueror)
12. Estilo De Vida (Lifestyle)
13. Interactive Track: EPK

=== Carajografia ===
EP with remakes and live performances, edited by Gua Gua Musica. Sold as a promotion with the ticket for the show Club carajo 3.0 in 2003.

1. Salvaje (Wild)
2. Resistiendo Con Ideas (Resisting With Ideas)
3. Diferentes Maneras (Different Ways)
4. Rescatarse (Save Oneself)
5. El Vago (The Bum)

Interactive Track: Ironia music video

=== Atrapasueños ===
Edited by Universal Music Argentina in 2004.

1. Hacerse Cargo (Take Responsibility)
2. Atrapasueños (Dreamcatcher)
3. Triste (Sad)
4. Mata-rutinas (Routine-Killer)
5. El Error (The Mistake)
6. Fluir (Flow)
7. El Llanto Espiritual (The Spiritual Cry)
8. La Fuerza Original (The Original Force)
9. La Huella Del Depredador (The Predator's Track)
10. Como Deberia Ser (How It Should Be)
11. De Frente Al Mar (Facing The Sea)
12. Bicho De Ciudad (City Bug)
13. ¿Qué Tienes Para Dar? (What Do You Have To Offer?)
14. Algo En Qué Creer (Something To Believe In)
15. De Hoy No Pasa (Doesn't Go Further Than Today)

Interactive Track: EPK

=== Electrorroto Acustizado 2.1 ===
Live CD of the special show "Electrorroto Acustizado 2.1". Edited in 2005 by Universal Music Argentina . It has a CD of live music and a DVD with Carajo's videography until that point.

- CD:
1. El Error (The Mistake)
2. Salvaje (Wild)
3. La Fuerza Original (The Original Force)
4. Algo En Que Creer (Something To Believe In)
5. Ironia (Irony)
6. El Llanto Espiritual (The Spiritual Cry)
7. Como Deberia Ser (How It Should Be)
8. Atrapasueños (Dreamcatcher)
9. De Frente Al Mar (Facing The Sea)
10. Triste (Sad)
11. No Tan Distintos (Not So Different)
12. El Vago (The Bum)
13. ¿Qué Tienes Para Dar? (What Do You Have To Offer?)
- DVD:
1. Sacate La Mierda (Take Your Shit Out)
2. Salvaje (Wild)
3. Ironia (Irony)
4. El Vago (The Bum)
5. El Error (The Mistake)
6. Triste (Sad)
7. Triste (electrorroto) [Sad (electrobroken)]

=== Inmundo ===
Released 21 June 2007 by Universal Music Argentina

1. In
2. Histeria, TV, Cancion de Moda (Hysteria, TV, Fashionable Song)
3. Chico Granada (Grenade Kid)
4. Inocencia Perdida (Lost Innocence)
5. Alma y Fuego (Soul and Fire)
6. Acorazados (Armored)
7. El Que Ama Lo Que Hace (The One Who Loves What He Does)
8. Joder (Fuck Around)
9. Una Oportunidad (One Opportunity)
10. Punk Sin Cresta (Punk Without a Mohawk)
11. Entre La Fe y La Razon (Between Faith and Reason)
12. Zion
13. Carne (Flesh)

Interactive Track: Chico Granada music video

=== El Mar de las Almas ===
Released 23 September 2010 by Universal Music Argentina

1. Intro
2. Ácido (Acid)
3. Luna Herida (Wounded Moon)
4. Una Nueva Batalla (A New Battle)
5. Fantasmas (Ghosts)
6. Libres (Free)
7. Pruebas (Tests)
8. Limbo
9. Frágil (Fragile)
10. Virus Anti-amor (Anti-love Virus)
11. Humildad (Humility)
12. El Mar de las Almas (The Sea of Souls)

=== Frente A Frente ===
Released 25 September 2013 produced independently

- Disc 1:
1. Trágico Mundo Caído (Tragic Fallen World)
2. Drama
3. Shock
4. La Venganza De Los Perdedores (Losers' Revenge)
5. Versus
6. Infección (Infection)
7. A Espaldas Del Bien (Facing Away from Righteousness)
8. Algo Habremos Hecho (We Must Have Done Something)
- Disc 2:
1. Tracción A Sangre (Blood Traction)
2. Para Vos (For You)
3. El Cofre Del Pasado (The Coffer From The Past)
4. Sobrevivir (Survive)
5. El Dedo En La Llaga (The Finger On The Sore)
6. Andante (Walker)
7. El Aguijón (The Sting)
8. Promesas (Promises)

== Non-official songs / covers ==
- "All Apologies" (Nirvana)
- "Angeles Caídos" (Ataque 77)
- "Another Brick In The Wall (Part 2)" (Pink Floyd)(fragmento)
- "Chalito" (A.N.I.M.A.L.)
- "Cómo Puede Ser" (Bandana) (fragmento)
- "Donde Las Aguilas Se Atreven" (Ataque 77)
- "El Matador" (Los Fabulosos Cadillacs)(fragmento)
- "Heart Shaped Box" (Nirvana)
- "Hechando Chingazos" (Brujeria)
- "Jijiji" (Patricio Rey y sus Redonditos de Ricota fragmento) (with Arbol)
- "Libres?" ("Free?" New song played live at some shows)
- "Loco Pro" (A.N.I.M.A.L.)
- "Lo Que Da Vida" ("What Gives Life")
- "Metallica Medley"
- "Medley de Pantera"
- "Message In A Bottle" (the Police)
- "No Tan Distintos" (Sumo)
- "Pantalla del Mundo Nuevo" (Riff)(fragmento)
- "Poison Heart" (the Ramones)
- "Ruta 66" (Pappo)(fragmento)
- "Smells Like Teen Spirit" (Nirvana)
- "Territorial Pissings" (Nirvana)
- "This Love" (Pantera)
- "Una Vela" (Cover Intoxicados junto a su vocalista)
- "Vacíos de Fe" (A.N.I.M.A.L.)

== Videography ==
- Sacate La Mierda – (2002) (Carajo)
- Salvaje – (2002) (Carajo)
- Ironia – (2003) (Carajo)
- El Vago – (2003) (Carajo)
- El Error – (2004) (Atrapasueños)
- Triste – (2005) (Atrapasueños)
- Triste (electrorroto) – (2005) (Electrorroto Acustizado 2.1)
- De Frente Al Mar – (2006) (Atrapasueños)
- Hacerse Cargo – (2007) (Atrapasueños)
- Chico Granada – (2007) (Inmundo)
- El Que Ama Lo Que Hace – (2007) (Inmundo)
- Formando Asi Cada Parte Del Todo – (2007) DVD (postponed, never released)
- Acorazados – (2008) (Inmundo)
- Joder – (2009) (Inmundo)
- Carne – (2009) (Inmundo)
- Acido – (2010) (El Mar de las Almas)
- Luna Herida – (2011) (El Mar de las Almas)
- Humildad – (2011) (El Mar de las Almas)
- Libres – (2012) (El Mar de las Almas)
- Virus Anti-Amor (2012) (El Mar de las Almas)
- Shock (2013) (Frente a Frente)
- La Venganza de los Perdedores (2013) (Frente a Frente)
- Tracción a Sangre (2014) (Frente a Frente)
- Para Vos (2014) (Frente a Frente)
- Drama (2014) (Frente a Frente)
