= Kina (musician) =

American musician (born 1969)

- Birth name: Kina Cosper
- Born: January 25, 1969 (age 56)
- Origin: Detroit, Michigan, U.S.
- Genres: Pop; indie pop; indie rock; R&B
- Occupations: Singer; songwriter; actress
- Years active: 1995–present
- Labels: MJJ Productions; Epic; DreamWorks
- Formerly of: Brownstone

Kina Cosper (born January 25, 1969) known simply as Kina, is an American musician, best known for her work with Grammy Award-nominated group Brownstone (after their nomination), and her 2000 solo single "Girl from the Gutter".

== Biography ==
=== Solo career ===
Kina was born in Detroit. At age 21, she moved to Los Angeles, where she worked as a server and in clerical positions as she tried to establish a musical career. She found success with her single "Girl from the Gutter", which received strong airplay and peaked at number 21 on the Billboard Hot Dance Music/Club Play chart. She then released her self-titled debut album on July 18, 2000. Kina peaked at number 14 on the Billboard Heatseekers chart.

"Girl from the Gutter" was followed by the single "Me", which peaked at number 3 on the same chart. "Have a Cry" was released to radio but never charted.

To date this is Kina's only released album. Kina parted ways with DreamWorks Records shortly after the final single release.

A few years after their release, Kina's songs began popping up in various TV shows. In fall 2005 "Give & Take" and "I Love You" both appeared in an episode of the UPN sitcom Girlfriends. Kina's song "Sincerely" was also featured in the motion picture Beauty Shop.

== Discography ==
=== Albums ===
- Kina (2000)

=== Singles ===
- "Girl from the Gutter" (2000)
- "Me" (2000)
- "Have a Cry" (2000)
