= If You Love Me (Brownstone song) =

1994 single by Brownstone

Single by Brownstone

from the album From the Bottom Up
- Released: October 24, 1994
- Genre: R&B; new jack swing
- Length: 5:04
- Label: MJJ Music; Epic
- Songwriters: Gordon Chambers; Nichole Gilbert; Dave Hall
- Producer: Dave "Jam" Hall

Brownstone singles chronology
| "Pass the Lovin'" (1994) | "If You Love Me" (1994) | "Grapevyne" (1995) |

Music video
- "If You Love Me" on YouTube

"If You Love Me" is a song by American R&B group Brownstone, released on October 24, 1994, by MJJ Music and Epic Records. It is the second single from their debut album, From the Bottom Up (1995). The song was written by Gordon Chambers, Nichole Gilbert, and Dave Hall, and features a sample from "Spellbound" (1990) by American rapper K-Solo. "If You Love Me" was nominated for a Best R&B Performance by a Duo or Group with Vocal at the 38th Annual Grammy Awards in 1996, losing to "Creep" by TLC.

"If You Love Me" peaked at number eight on both the US Billboard Hot 100 and the UK Singles Chart as well as number two on the Billboard Hot R&B Singles chart. It topped the New Zealand Singles Chart for five weeks and reached the top 20 in Australia, France, Ireland, and the Netherlands. The music video for the Remix features rapper Craig Mack. In 2015, Canadian singer Tory Lanez sampled the song for his hit single "Say It". Billboard magazine named the song number 84 on their list of "100 Greatest Girl Group Songs of All Time".

== Critical reception ==
Caroline Sullivan from The Guardian complimented the song's "memorable chorus". Chuck Campbell from Knoxville News Sentinel noted its "mellow seduction". Geoffrey Himes from The Washington Post declared the song as "a firm demand for commitment from a lover." He explained, "It begins with Gilbert and her two partners, Charmayne "Maxee" Maxwell and Monica "Mimi" Doby, singing slow, swooning harmonies over producer Dave Hall's piano. Having established the romantic mood, Gilbert lays down her conditions to a catchy melodic chant and the beat of an insistent drum machine: "If you want my heart/ Then it's time that you start/ To act like you're mine/ In the light and the dark." It's a great single, and it sets the pattern for an album that celebrates the intoxication of romance but demands respect as well."

== Track listings ==
- US maxi-CD single
1. "If You Love Me" (Smooth Out remix extended version) – 5:45
2. "If You Love Me" (If You Jazz Me remix extended version) – 5:45
3. "If You Love Me" (Characters Funk remix extended version) – 5:45
4. "If You Love Me" (LP version radio edit) – 3:43
5. "If You Love Me" (Soft Touch Mix radio edit) – 3:44
6. "If You Love Me" (a cappella) – 3:42
- US 12-inch single

A1. "If You Love Me" (LP version) – 5:04
A2. "If You Love Me" (LP version a cappella) – 3:42
B1. "If You Love Me" (Smooth Out remix extended version) – 5:45
B2. "If You Love Me" (If You Jazz Me remix extended version) – 5:45
B3. "If You Love Me" (Characters Funk remix extended version) – 5:45

- US and UK cassette single; European CD single

A. "If You Love Me" (LP version radio edit) – 3:43
B. "If You Love Me" (Soft Touch mix radio edit) – 3:44

- US maxi-cassette single

A1. "If You Love Me" (Smooth Out remix radio edit)
A2. "If You Love Me" (If You Jazz Me remix radio edit)
A3. "If You Love Me" (Characters Funk remix radio edit)
B1. "If You Love Me" (Smooth Out remix extended version)
B2. "If You Love Me" (If You Jazz Me remix extended version)
B3. "If You Love Me" (Characters Funk remix extended version)

- UK CD1
1. "If You Love Me" (album version radio edit) – 3:43
2. "If You Love Me" (Smooth Out remix radio edit) – 4:14
3. "If You Love Me" (If You Jazz Me remix radio edit) – 4:21
4. "If You Love Me" (Characters Funk remix radio edit) – 4:14
5. "If You Love Me" (Soft Touch Mix radio edit) – 3:44
6. "If You Love Me" (acapella) – 3:42
- UK CD2
1. "If You Love Me" (Channel 9 mix) – 7:33
2. "If You Love Me" (Uno Clip dub) – 6:57
3. "If You Love Me" (Smooth Out remix extended) – 5:45
4. "If You Love Me" (If You Jazz Me remix extended) – 5:45
5. "If You Love Me" (Characters Funk remix extended) – 5:45
- Australian maxi-CD single
1. "If You Love Me" (Smooth Out remix extended) – 5:45
2. "If You Love Me" (If You Jazz Me remix extended) – 5:45
3. "If You Love Me" (Characters Funk remix extended) – 4:13
4. "If You Love Me" (LP version radio edit) – 3:43
5. "If You Love Me" (Soft Touch Mix radio edit) – 3:44
6. "If You Love Me" (a cappella) – 3:42

== Personnel ==
- Produced by Dave "Jam" Hall for Untouchables Entertainment, Inc.
- Additional production and remixes by
  - The Characters: Troy Taylor & Charles Farrar for Character Music Corporation
  - Uno Clio

== Charts ==
=== Weekly charts ===
| Chart (1995) | Peak position |
|---|---|
| Australia (ARIA) | 13 |
| Canada Retail Singles (The Record) | 12 |
| Canada Top Singles (RPM) | 69 |
| Canada Dance/Urban (RPM) | 10 |
| Europe (Eurochart Hot 100) | 12 |
| Europe (European Dance Radio) | 9 |
| Europe (European Hit Radio) | 16 |
| France (SNEP) | 18 |
| Ireland (IRMA) | 15 |
| Netherlands (Dutch Top 40) | 16 |
| Netherlands (Single Top 100) | 16 |
| New Zealand (Recorded Music NZ) | 1 |
| Scottish Singles Sales (Official Charts) | 26 |
| UK Singles (Official Charts) | 8 |
| UK Airplay (Music Week) | 8 |
| UK Dance (Official Charts) | 11 |
| UK Hip Hop/R&B (Official Charts) | 2 |
| UK Pop Tip Club Chart (Music Week) | 35 |
| US Billboard Hot 100 | 8 |
| US Adult Contemporary (Billboard) | 38 |
| US Dance Singles Sales (Billboard) | 2 |
| US Hot R&B/Hip-Hop Songs (Billboard) | 2 |
| US Pop Airplay (Billboard) | 21 |
| US Rhythmic Airplay (Billboard) | 2 |
| US Cash Box Top 100 | 2 |

=== Year-end charts ===
| Chart (1995) | Position |
|---|---|
| Australia (ARIA) | 60 |
| France (SNEP) | 63 |
| New Zealand (RIANZ) | 16 |
| UK Singles (OCC) | 71 |
| UK Airplay (Music Week) | 41 |
| US Billboard Hot 100 | 34 |
| US Hot R&B Singles (Billboard) | 4 |
| US Top 40/Rhythm-Crossover (Billboard) | 13 |
| US Cash Box Top 100 | 36 |

== Certifications ==
| Region | Certification | Certified units/sales |
|---|---|---|
| Australia (ARIA) | Gold | 35,000^{^} |
| New Zealand (RMNZ) | Gold | 15,000^{‡} |
| United Kingdom (BPI) | Silver | 200,000^{‡} |
| United States (RIAA) | Gold | 500,000^{^} |
^{^} Shipments figures based on certification alone.^{‡} Sales+streaming figures based on certification alone.

== Release history ==
| Region | Date | Format(s) | Label(s) | Ref. |
|---|---|---|---|---|
| United States | October 24, 1994 | 12-inch vinyl; CD; cassette | MJJ Music; Epic | |
| Australia | March 3, 1995 | CD; cassette | MJJ Music; Epic | |
| United Kingdom | March 20, 1995 | 12-inch vinyl; CD1; cassette | MJJ Music; Epic | |
| United Kingdom | March 27, 1995 | CD2 | MJJ Music; Epic | |
