= Grapevyne =

1995 single by Brownstone

Single by Brownstone

from the album From the Bottom Up
- Released: April 11, 1995
- Genre: R&B
- Length: 5:38
- Label: MJJ Music; Epic
- Songwriters: Andrea Gilbert; Nichole Gilbert; Dave "Jam" Hall
- Producer: Dave "Jam" Hall

Brownstone singles chronology
"If You Love Me" (1994)	"Grapevyne" (1995)	"I Can't Tell You Why" (1995)

Music video
- "Grapevyne" on YouTube

"Grapevyne" is a song by American R&B vocal group Brownstone, released in April 1995 by MJJ Music and Epic Records as the second single from their debut album, From the Bottom Up (1995). The song is written by Andrea Gilbert, Nichole Gilbert and Dave "Jam" Hall, and produced by the latter. It reached number 49 on the US Billboard Hot 100 and number six on the Billboard Hot R&B Singles chart. It also charted at number 16 on the UK Singles Chart and number 15 in New Zealand. The official music video for "Grapevyne", directed by Kevin Bray, was filmed at the Sheats–Goldstein Residence.

== Critical reception ==
Steve Baltin from Cash Box noted, "Coming out while the latter is still locked into the top 10 ensures a high amount of interest for Brownstone's latest single. A bit more sultry than before, Brownstone show they can play the game at night with the grinding deep voice effort. Another hit." Chuck Campbell from Knoxville News Sentinel remarked the "atmospheric emotion" on the track. Mark Sutherland from Smash Hits gave it two out of five, viewing it as "smooth-but-tune-free slabs of R&B".

== Charts ==
=== Weekly charts ===
Chart (1995)	Peak position
Australia (ARIA)	44
New Zealand (Recorded Music NZ)	15
Scottish Singles Sales (Official Charts)	59
UK Singles (Official Charts)	16
UK Dance (Official Charts)	10
UK Hip Hop/R&B (Official Charts)	3
US Billboard Hot 100	49
US Hot R&B/Hip-Hop Songs (Billboard)	6
US Cash Box Top 100	45

=== Year-end charts ===
Chart (1995)	Position
US Hot R&B Singles (Billboard)	39

== Release history ==
Region	Date	Format(s)	Label(s)	Ref.
United States	April 11, 1995	Contemporary hit radio	MMJ Music; Epic	
United Kingdom	July 3, 1995	12-inch vinyl; CD; cassette	MMJ Music; Epic	
Australia	July 24, 1995	CD; cassette	MMJ Music; Epic	
