= Dar Sangre =

Argentine metal band

- Origin: Buenos Aires, Argentina
- Genres: Metalcore, melodic death metal, deathcore
- Years active: 2004-present
- Labels: Inmune, Vegan
- Members: Matias Espinosa; Juanchy Badessich; Federico Dimarco; Ivan Resnik; Pedro Badessich
- Past members: Jonatan Flores; Ramiro Arias
- Website: Official MySpace

Dar Sangre, founded in 2004, is a metal band from Buenos Aires, Argentina.

== History ==
Dar Sangre was founded in 2004 when musicians from many underground hardcore bands met together. In 2005, the group released the first demo called “Primeros Auxilios” with nine tracks. The band was signed by the Argentine independent label Immune Records. In 2008, the band recorded their debut album, “Un Corazón Por Cada Ciudad”. Drums were recorded by Martin Carrizo (a former musician of A.N.I.M.A.L.) and all other productions were done by Javier Casas at Infire Studios.

After the band was signed to Vegan Records, a Buenos Aires–based independent label, Dar Sangre released the following album entitled “Imperios Por Derrumbar” at Unison Studios (Gustavo Cerati) and mastered by Danish producers Tue Madsen and Jacob Olsen at Ant Farm Studio in Denmark. Dar Sangre released a music video of their song “Regreso”.

Dar Sangre shared the stage with successful acts of the hardcore scene like Throwdown, It Dies Today, Terror, Silverstein, Hatebreed, Comeback Kid, Job for a Cowboy, Strife and As I Lay Dying.

== Musical style ==
Dar Sangre plays modern metalcore which is influenced by hardcore punk, and melodic death metal bands like In Flames and Dark Tranquility. Lyrical themes are relationships, inner struggles and poetry. The lyrics are all written by the band in Spanish.
