= Bulldog (band) =

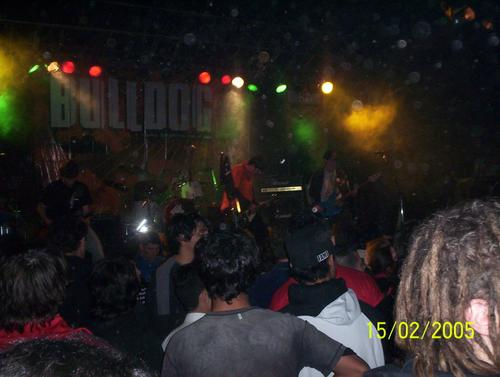

Background information
- Origin: Rosario, Santa Fe, Argentina
- Genres: Punk
- Years active: 1992–present
- Labels: Pinhead Records
- Members: Mantu (Vocals and second guitar); Rata (Bass guitar); Willy (Lead guitar); Adrian (Drums)
- Past members: Bebe (Drums)
- Website: www.masquediez.com

Bulldog is an Argentine punk rock band formed in 1989.

== Discography ==
- Si Yo! (1995)
- Un Lugar Para Juntarnos (1997)
- El Ángel de la Muerte (1998)
- Circo Calesita (2000)
- El Campo de los Sueños (2002)
- Todos los perros van al cielo (2004)
- Yo estuve ahí... nosotros también (live, part 1) (2005)
- Yo estuve ahí... nosotros también (live, part 2) (2006)
- Salvaje (2007)
- Repolución (2009)

== See also ==
- Argentine punk
- Argentine rock
