= Gordon Chambers =

American singer-songwriter (born c. 1969)

Gordon Anthony Chambers (c. 1969) is an American singer-songwriter and record producer who has written songs for more than 75 recording artists including Angie Stone, Yolanda Adams, The Isley Brothers, Brandy, Trey Songz, Chaka Khan, Patti LaBelle, Usher, Marc Anthony, Jamie Foxx, Aretha Franklin, Beyoncé Knowles, and Nao Yoshioka. His number-1 hits as lyricist include Anita Baker's Grammy-winning hit "I Apologize", Brownstone's Grammy-nominated hit "If You Love Me", Angie Stone's "No More Rain (In This Cloud)", the Grammy-nominated theme of 1996's Set It Off "Missing You" (performed by Brandy, Tamia, Gladys Knight and Chaka Khan) and Yolanda Adams "Someone Watching Over You". He is the winner of eight awards from the American Society of Composers, Authors and Publishers (ASCAP), has four Dove Award nominations, and his songs have been nominated for three Grammy Awards. Anita Baker won a Grammy for "I Apologize", which Chambers wrote. His songs have been performed at the Essence Awards, American Music Awards, the Goodwill Games and the White House. His prestigious appearances, in addition to acclaimed European and Japanese tours, have included the Essence Music Festival, the Congressional Black Caucus, the Apollo Theater, Constitution Hall, B. B King's and the Kennedy Center.

== Biography ==
Chambers was born in the Bronx to parents from Jamaica, his father having grown up in Montego Bay and his mother in Port Antonio and Kingston. Chambers moved to Teaneck, New Jersey, in 1977. He wrote his first song at the age of seven and was guided by other Teaneck residents, including trombonist Dick Griffin, bassist Rufus Reid and drummer Lenny White. At Teaneck High School he learned piano and trumpet, and joined New Progressions, a 16-piece band. In an interview with The Record, Chambers stated that "Teaneck is the place where I had all my musical training" and recalled: "Growing up, knowing that [I] lived in Teaneck gave me something to dream and aspire to: that one day I could grow up and become a professional."

Chambers enrolled at Brown University, in 1986, planning to major in political science and become a lawyer. After graduating, he returned to Teaneck, where he wrote "If You Love Me", the single by Brownstone released in 1994 that reached No. 8 on the Billboard Hot 100. While working as entertainment editor for Essence magazine in 1993, an interview with Queen Latifah led to the opportunity to write the song "Winki's Theme" that appeared on her 1993 album Black Reign. Gordon also has no kids but one nephew named Jonai Chambers (his younger brother Brian's son) who is also an aspiring musician but also pursues a basketball career.

His solo albums have been nominated for Independent Soul Album of the Year by Soultracks.com and have been among CDBaby's top R&B sellers. His first solo album, Introducing Gordon Chambers, was released in 2005 and featured special guests Carl Thomas, Glenn Lewis, Sara Devine, Roy Hargrove and Mike Phillips. His second album, Love Stories, was released in 2007 and features soul artist Ledisi. Gordon Chambers' album Sincere was released in August 2011, featuring duets with Sara Devine and Candace Coles, and production by Darien Dorsey, The BeatBanggahz and Jermaine Mobley. The album also includes covers of Donny Hathaway's "A Song For You" and his version of "Missing You", which he dedicates to late mentors Phyllis Hyman and Gerald Levert.

As of 2009, Chambers resides in Brooklyn.
