= Pinhead Records =

Argentinian music label

- Founded: 1990
- Genre: Punk rock, Post hardcore, Metal, Ska
- Country of origin: Argentina
- Location: Rosario (Headquarter)
- Official website: www.pinheadrecords.com.ar

Pinhead Records is an Argentine recording label based in Rosario. Pinhead Records was founded in 1990. Pinhead Records is a booking agency for Argentine artists who signed to the label. As booking agency Pinhead Records arranges concerts in South America.

Pinhead Records distributes merchandising articles and CDs by Earth Crisis, No Fun at All, Agnostic Front and Millencolin in Argentina. Pinhead Records runs the “Resistance Tour” together with Gonna Go. The Resistance Tour is an Argentina musical tour which is running since 2007. In February 2010, German punk rock band Die Toten Hosen played a show on the tour in San Roque.

== Bands ==
- All the Hats
- Asesinos Cereales
- Asphix
- Boikot
- Buffer
- Bulldog
- Carmina Burana
- Dead Fish
- Delfinas de Etiopia
- DENY
- Dople Fuerza
- El Ultimo Ke Zierre
- Flema
- Fluido
- Gatillazo
- Generacion Zombie
- Jordan
- Katarro Vandaliko
- La Polla
- Las Manos de Filippi
- Mal Momento
- Mal Pasar
- Nihilismo
- No Relax
- Ratos de Porao
- Reincidentes
- Ricky Espinoza
- ROMA
- Sin Ley
- Superova
- The Ramainz
- Tierra Santa
- Todos Tus Muertos
- Trotsky Vengaran
- Tukera
- WDK
