= Brownstone (group) =

American girl group

- Origin: Los Angeles, California, U.S.
- Genres: R&B; soul
- Works: Brownstone discography
- Years active: 1994–1998; 2007–2015; 2019–present
- Labels: Epic; MJJ Productions
- Members: Nicci Gilbert; Arin Jackson; Alexis Jones
- Past members: Mimi Doby; Maxee Maxwell; Kina Cosper; Teisha Brown
- Website: brownstoneofficial.com

Brownstone is an American female contemporary R&B group that was popular during the mid-1990s. They are best known for their 1994 hit single "If You Love Me", which was nominated for a Best R&B Performance Grammy Award. "Grapevyne", "5 Miles to Empty" and "Pass the Lovin'" also brought them some success, as well as their rendition of "I Can't Tell You Why", a song originally recorded by The Eagles.

In 2019, it was announced that Brownstone were to reunite with founding members Nicci Gilbert and Mimi Doby, alongside returning member Teisha Brown for the 25th anniversary of the Essence Festival in July, as well the 25th anniversary of the group.

== Career ==
The three original members of Brownstone were Monica "Mimi" Doby, Charmayne Maxena "Maxee" Maxwell, and Nichole "Nicci" Gilbert. Founded in Los Angeles, the singers met each other after attending various auditions around the city. They formed the group and were signed to MJJ Productions less than a year. The group soon recorded its debut album From the Bottom Up, which spawned the hit singles "If You Love Me" and "Grapevyne." In 1995, the group earned a Grammy Award nomination and a Billboard Music Award. After extensive touring around the globe, Doby left the group for health reasons; in an interview with Video Soul host Donnie Simpson, the problem was cited as bronchitis. The cause of her split from the group was later said (in radio interviews) to be internal strife with the other two members. She was replaced by Kina Cosper of Detroit; other members over the years includes Kymberli Wright of Detroit, Racquel Roberts of Los Angeles and Teisha Brown of Detroit.

After a difficult transition period, Brownstone released the song "5 Miles to Empty" from their sophomore album Still Climbing. In 1998, Brownstone was featured on the soundtrack for the film The Players Club with the song "Don't Play Me Wrong".

Charmayne Maxena "Maxee" Maxwell died on February 27, 2015, at age 46 following what has been reported publicly as an accidental fall.

=== 2019: Brownstone's 25th anniversary ===
In February 2019, it was announced that Brownstone were to reunite for a one-off performance for the 25th anniversary of the Essence Music Festival with founding members Nicci Gilbert, Mimi Doby, and returning member Teisha Brown, as well as the 25th anniversary of the group. During an interview with former member Kina Cosper, she expressed that she was invited to perform alongside Gilbert and Doby, but that she "respectfully declined."

=== 2022–present: New music ===
During the Centennial Boule (July 2022), all three members were inducted into Sigma Gamma Rho sorority. On September 13, 2022, Brownstone's newest line-up, composed of founding member Nicci Gilbert, Teisha Brown and new member Arin Jackson, announced the release of the group's new single "All I Want" on September 30, 2022. It has been announced, Teisha Brown has departed the group and has been replaced by Arin's sister Alexis Jones.

In 2023, Brownstone has released their live cover of "Ain't No Mountain High Enough" from their upcoming live covers album.

== Discography ==
Studio albums

- From the Bottom Up (1995)
- Still Climbing (1997)

== Members ==
=== Current members ===
- Nicci Gilbert (1994–1998, 2007–2015, 2019–present)
- Arin Jackson (2019–present)
- Alexis Jones (2022–present)

=== Former members ===
- Mimi Doby (1994–1995, 2019)
- Maxee Maxwell (1994–1998, 2007–2015; her death)
- Kina Cosper (1995–1997)
- Teisha Brown (2008–2015, 2019–2022)

== Awards and nominations ==
Year	Award
1995	Billboard Music Award for Top Hot R&B Singles Airplay for "If You Love Me"
1995	Billboard Music Award nomination for Top Hot R&B Singles Artist – Duos/Group
1995	Billboard Music Award nomination for Top Hot R&B Singles Artist
1995	Billboard Music Award nomination for Top New R&B Artist
1995	Billboard Music Award nomination for Top R&B Artist – Duos/Group
1995	Billboard Music Award nomination for Top Hot R&B Singles & Tracks for "If You Love Me"
1995	Grammy Award nomination for Best Rhythm & Blues Vocal Performance – Duo or Group ("If You Love Me")
1995	Lady of Soul Music Award nomination for Best R&B/Soul Song of the Year for "If You Love Me"
