= I Can't Tell You Why =

Single by Eagles

from the album The Long Run
- B-side: "The Greeks Don't Want No Freaks"
- Released: February 8, 1980
- Recorded: March 1978
- Genre: Blue-eyed soul; rock
- Length: 4:56 (album version); 4:30 (7" single)
- Label: Asylum
- Songwriters: Timothy B. Schmit; Glenn Frey; Don Henley
- Producer: Bill Szymczyk

Eagles singles chronology
"The Long Run" (1979)	"I Can't Tell You Why" (1980)	"Seven Bridges Road" (1980)

Music video
- "I Can't Tell You Why" by Eagles on YouTube

"I Can't Tell You Why" is a song by the American rock band Eagles that appeared on their sixth studio album The Long Run (1979). It was written by band members Timothy B. Schmit, Glenn Frey and Don Henley. Recorded in March 1978, it was the first song finished for the album and the first Eagles song to feature Schmit on lead vocals. Released as a single in February 1980, it became a Billboard top 10 hit in April, reaching number eight on the Billboard Hot 100 and number three on the Adult Contemporary chart. It was the group's last top ten hit on the Billboard Hot 100.

== Background ==
Timothy B. Schmit provided the song title and composed the nucleus of "I Can't Tell You Why," which he then presented to Glenn Frey and Don Henley, and they completed the song together. Henley described the finished song as "straight Al Green" and said that Frey, an R&B fan from Detroit, was responsible for the R&B feel of the song. Frey said to Schmit: "You could sing like Smokey Robinson. Let's not do a Richie Furay, Poco-sounding song. Let's do an R&B song."

Schmit describes the song as "loosely based on my own experiences." Schmit said: "I had some writing sessions with Don and Glenn and I threw out a bunch of my ideas and that one [for "I Can't Tell You Why"] stuck. I had [composed] a pretty good part of it, not a huge part but enough for them to think 'That could be good' and go with it. So Don, Glenn and I finished it over a few all night sessions." He also said, "When it was being developed in the studio...I knew it was a great song. I [thought] 'Yes! This is an amazing debut for me.' When we finally mixed it, we had a little listening party at the studio. As people were hearing it, Don turned to me and said, 'There's your first hit.'"

Schmit sang the lead vocals, with Frey and Henley singing counterpoint. Schmit also played the bass on the track, which has a distinctive riff believed by Schmit to have been devised by Frey. According to Henley, Frey wrote the counterpoint part.

In 1980, the band promoted the song with a music video featuring Schmit on bass guitar accompanied by Frey on the electric piano, although Frey recorded the guitar solos on the recording, with Henley on drums, Don Felder on electric guitar, Joe Walsh on organ and Walsh's touring sideman Joe Vitale on ARP string synthesizer. Live versions of the song were released on the 1980 album Eagles Live and 1994's Hell Freezes Over.

Schmit also performed "I Can't Tell You Why" while on tour as a member of Ringo Starr & His All-Starr Band in 1992. Their performance of the song was included on the 1993 live album Ringo Starr and His All Starr Band Volume 2: Live from Montreux.

== Reception ==
Cash Box said that "Schmit’s aching, near-falsetto vocal here adds immeasurable depth to the haunting quality of this love song, with a tastefully sparse instrumental." Record World said that "Tim Schmidt, the newest Eagle, lends his sweet falsetto and writing talents to this pretty love ballad."

In 2017, Billboard ranked the song number six on its list of the 15 greatest Eagles songs, In 2019, Rolling Stone ranked the song number 11 on its list of the 40 greatest Eagles songs. Ultimate Classic Rock critic Sterling Whitaker rated it as the Eagles 5th most underrated song, praising Schmit's "beautiful falsetto" and Frey's "melodic" guitar solo.

== Track listing ==
- 7" single (45-1965/AS 12.418/K 12418/E-46608)

Side A
No.	Title	Writer(s)	Length
1.	"I Can't Tell You Why"	Frey, Henley, Schmit	4:30

Side B
No.	Title	Writer(s)	Length
2.	"The Greeks Don't Want No Freaks"	Frey, Henley	2:20

- 7" promo (E-46608)

Side A
No.	Title	Writer(s)	Length
1.	"I Can't Tell You Why" (Mono)	Frey, Henley, Schmit	4:30

Side B
No.	Title	Writer(s)	Length
2.	"I Can't Tell You Why" (Stereo)	Frey, Henley, Schmit	4:30

== Covers ==
- In 1989, former lead singer of The Manhattans, Gerald Alston covered I Can't Tell You Why for Motown Records. It reached number 52 on the Billboard Hot R&B/Hip-Hop Singles & Tracks.
- In 1990, R&B singer Howard Hewett covered "I Can't Tell You Why" which is on his self-titled third album. It peaked at number 24 on the Billboard Hot R&B/Hip-Hop Singles & Tracks.
- In 1993, "I Can't Tell You Why" was covered by American country music artist Vince Gill for the Eagles tribute album Common Thread: The Songs of the Eagles. Schmit sang backing vocals on the recording. This version went to number 42 on the Hot Country Songs chart.
- In 1995, R&B group Brownstone covered the song on their debut album, From the Bottom Up. Their version reached number 54 on the Billboard Hot 100, number 22 on the Hot R&B chart and number 27 in the UK top 75.
- Alternative rock band Lazlo Bane covered the song for their 2007 cover album Guilty Pleasures.
- In 2015, Canadian jazz pianist and singer Diana Krall covered the song on her album Wallflower. Her version reached number 10 on the Billboard Smooth Jazz chart.

== Personnel ==
- Timothy B. Schmit: lead vocals, bass guitar
- Don Henley: drums, backing vocals
- Don Felder: guitar
- Glenn Frey: guitar solos, Fender Rhodes electric piano, backing vocals
- Joe Walsh: Hammond organ
- Joe Vitale: ARP String Synthesizer

== Chart performance ==
=== Weekly charts ===
Chart (1980)	Peak position
Canada Top Singles (RPM)	5
Canada Adult Contemporary (RPM)	2
Netherlands (Single Top 100)	49
New Zealand (Recorded Music NZ)	11
US Billboard Hot 100	8
US Adult Contemporary (Billboard)	3

=== Year-end charts ===
Chart (1980)	Rank
Canada RPM Top Singles	43
US Billboard Hot 100	62
