= The J. Geils Band discography =

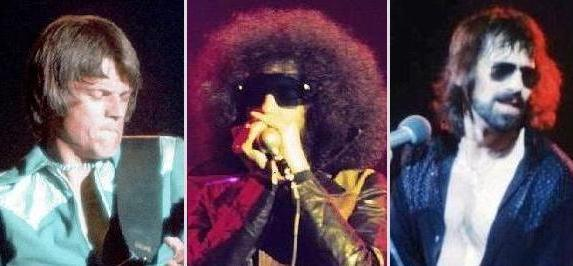
- From left to right: J. Geils, Magic Dick, and Peter Wolf
- Studio albums: 11
- Live albums: 3
- Compilation albums: 9
- Singles: 30
- Video albums: 1
- Other appearances: 1

The discography of American rock band The J. Geils Band consists of 11 studio albums, three live albums, eight compilation albums, one video album, and 30 singles. Formed in 1967 in Worcester, Massachusetts, the band consisted of guitarist J. Geils, singer Peter Wolf, harmonica player Magic Dick, bassist Danny Klein, keyboard player Seth Justman, and drummer Stephen Jo Bladd. Their debut album, The J. Geils Band (1970), released by Atlantic Records, charted at number 195 on the United States Billboard 200. Their second album, The Morning After (1971), peaked at number 64 on the Billboard 200 and number 73 on Canada's Top Albums chart. It produced the single "Looking for a Love", which reached the top 40 in the US and in Canada.

Having expanded their fan base primarily from concerts, The J. Geils Band released their first live album, "Live" Full House, in 1972. It was their most commercially successful album yet, and was certified gold by the Recording Industry Association of America (RIAA). The band's third studio album, Bloodshot (1973), became their first top-ten album in the US and also received a gold certification from the RIAA. The album's lead single, "Give It to Me", peaked at number 30 in the US and number 39 in Canada. Ladies Invited followed in 1973 but failed to meet sales expectations. The J. Geils Band returned to the top 40 in 1974 with their fifth album, Nightmares...and Other Tales from the Vinyl Jungle, and the single "Must of Got Lost". However, the band's next two studio albums, Hotline (1975) and Monkey Island (1977), were commercial disappointments, and in 1978 the band left Atlantic Records for EMI.

Released in 1978, Sanctuary was the J. Geils Band's first album to receive gold certification from the RIAA since Bloodshot. The band's ninth album, Love Stinks (1980), produced two top 40 singles in the US and in Canada: "Come Back" and the title track. Music Canada certified the album platinum, and the RIAA certified it gold. Freeze-Frame (1982) is the J. Geils Band's most commercially successful album. It reached the top 20 in several countries and peaked at number one in the US and in Canada, where it was certified three times multi-platinum. "Centerfold", the album's first single, became an international hit and topped the charts in the US, Australia, and Canada. The album's title track also reached the top 10 in several countries. The band's commercial success continued with the live album Showtime! (1982), which the RIAA certified gold. Wolf left the band in 1983 over artistic differences, and Justman took over lead vocals on the band's 11th album, You're Gettin' Even While I'm Gettin' Odd (1984), which sold poorly. After disbanding in 1985, the J. Geils Band began performing again in 1999.

== Albums ==
=== Studio albums ===
List of studio albums, with selected chart positions and certifications
Title	Album details	Peak chart positions								Certifications
Title	Album details	US	AUS	CAN	GER	NLD	NZ	SWE	UK	Certifications
The J. Geils Band	Released: November 16, 1970; Label: Atlantic; Format: CS, CD, LP	195	—	—	—	—	—	—	—	
The Morning After	Released: October 2, 1971; Label: Atlantic; Format: CS, CD, LP	64	—	73	—	—	—	—	—	
Bloodshot	Released: April 12, 1973; Label: Atlantic; Format: CS, CD, LP	10	—	17	—	—	—	—	—	RIAA: Gold
Ladies Invited	Released: November 9, 1973; Label: Atlantic; Format: CS, CD, LP	51	—	85	—	—	—	—	—	
Nightmares...and Other Tales from the Vinyl Jungle	Released: September 25, 1974; Label: Atlantic; Format: CS, CD, LP	26	—	32	—	—	—	—	—	
Hotline	Released: September 9, 1975; Label: Atlantic; Format: CS, CD, LP	36	—	—	—	—	—	—	—	
Monkey Island	Released: June 9, 1977; Label: Atlantic; Format: CS, CD, LP	51	97	—	—	—	—	—	—	
Sanctuary	Released: November 1978; Label: EMI; Format: CS, CD, LP	49	82	53	—	—	—	—	—	RIAA: Gold
Love Stinks	Released: January 28, 1980; Label: EMI; Format: CS, CD, LP	18	43	4	—	—	—	—	—	MC: Platinum; RIAA: Gold
Freeze-Frame	Released: October 26, 1981; Label: EMI; Format: CS, CD, LP	1	21	1	13	11	14	13	12	MC: 3× Platinum; RIAA: Platinum
You're Gettin' Even While I'm Gettin' Odd	Released: October 5, 1984; Label: EMI; Format: CS, LP	80	—	84	—	—	—	—	—	
"—" denotes a recording that did not chart or was not released in that territory.

=== Live albums ===
List of live albums, with selected chart positions and certifications
Title	Album details	Peak chart positions		Certifications
Title	Album details	US	CAN	Certifications
Live Full House	Released: September 26, 1972; Label: Atlantic; Format: CS, CD, LP	54	65	RIAA: Gold
Blow Your Face Out	Released: April 22, 1976; Label: Atlantic; Format: CS, CD, LP	40	78	
Showtime!	Released: November 12, 1982; Label: EMI; Format: CS, CD, LP	23	21	RIAA: Gold
"—" denotes a recording that did not chart or was not released in that territory.

=== Compilation albums ===
List of compilation albums, with selected chart positions
Title	Album details	Peak chart positions
Title	Album details	US
Best of The J. Geils Band	Released: June 5, 1979; Label: Atlantic; Format: CS, CD, LP	129
Best of The J. Geils Band Two	Released: October 1980; Label: Atlantic; Format: CS, LP	201 (Note: Best of the J. Geils Band Two did not enter the Billboard 200, but peaked at number 201 on the Bubbling Under the Top LP's chart.)
Flashback: The Best of the J. Geils Band	Released: March 1985; Label: EMI; Format: CS, CD, LP	—
Flamethrower	Released: 1986; Label: EMI; Format: CS	—
Houseparty: The J. Geils Band Anthology	Released: April 20, 1993; Label: Rhino; Format: CS, CD	—
Must of Got Lost	Released: February 28, 1995; Label: Rhino; Format: CS, CD	—
Looking for a Love and Other Hits	Released: June 10, 1997; Label: Rhino; Format: CD	—
The Very Best J. Geils Band Album Ever	Released: April 15, 2002; Label: EMI; Format: CD	—
Best of The J. Geils Band	Released: April 4, 2006; Label: Capitol; Format: CD	—
"—" denotes a recording that did not chart or was not released in that territory.

=== Video albums ===
List of video albums, with selected chart positions
Title	Album details	Peak chart positions
Title	Album details	US
House Party: Live in Germany	Released: February 23, 2015; Label: Eagle Rock; Format: DVD+CD	5
"—" denotes a recording that did not chart or was not released in that territory.

== Singles ==
List of singles, with selected chart positions and certifications, showing year released and album name
Title	Year	Peak chart positions									Certifications	Album
Title	Year	US	AUS	BEL	CAN	GER	NLD	NZ	SWI	UK	Certifications	Album
"Homework" / "First I Look at the Purse"	1969	—	—	—	—	—	—	—	—	—		The J. Geils Band
"Wait"	1971	—	—	—	—	—	—	—	—	—		The J. Geils Band
"Looking for a Love"	1971	39	—	—	25	—	—	—	—	—		The Morning After
"I Don't Need You No More"	1972	—	—	—	—	—	—	—	—	—		The Morning After
"Hard Drivin' Man" (live)	1972	—	—	—	—	—	—	—	—	—		"Live" Full House
"Give It to Me"	1973	30	—	—	39	—	—	—	—	—		Bloodshot
"Make Up Your Mind"	1973	98	—	—	—	—	—	—	—	—		Bloodshot
"Did You No Wrong"	1973	— (Note: "Did You No Wrong" did not enter the Billboard Hot 100, but peaked at number 104 on the Bubbling Under Hot 100 Singles chart.)	—	—	—	—	—	—	—	—		Ladies Invited
"Must of Got Lost"	1974	12	72	—	27	—	—	—	—	—		Nightmares...and Other Tales from the Vinyl Jungle
"Givin' It All Up"	1975	— (Note: "Givin' It All Up" did not enter the Billboard Hot 100, but peaked at number 106 on the Bubbling Under Hot 100 Singles chart.)	—	—	—	—	—	—	—	—		Nightmares...and Other Tales from the Vinyl Jungle
"Love-Itis"	1975	—	—	—	—	—	—	—	—	—		Hotline
"Where Did Our Love Go"(Live)	1976	68	—	—	—	—	—	—	—	—		Blow Your Face Out
"(Ain't Nothin' But a) House Party" (live)	1976	—	—	—	—	—	—	—	—	—		Blow Your Face Out
"Peanut Butter"	1976	—	—	—	—	—	—	—	—	—		Non-album single
"You're the Only One"	1977	83	—	—	—	—	—	—	—	—		Monkey Island
"Surrender"	1977	—	—	—	—	—	—	—	—	—		Monkey Island
"I Do"	1977	—	—	—	—	—	—	—	—	—		Monkey Island
"One Last Kiss"	1978	35	—	—	58	—	—	—	—	74		Sanctuary
"Take It Back"	1979	67	—	—	94	—	—	—	—	—		Sanctuary
"Sanctuary"	1979	—	—	—	—	—	—	—	—	—		Sanctuary
"Come Back"	1980	32	31	—	19	—	—	—	—	—		Love Stinks
"Love Stinks"	1980	38	—	—	15	—	—	—	—	—		Love Stinks
"Just Can't Wait"	1980	78	—	—	—	—	—	—	—	—		Love Stinks
"Centerfold"	1981	1	1	2	1	13	4	5	4	3	ARIA: Gold; BPI: Silver; MC: Platinum; RIAA: Gold	Freeze-Frame
"Freeze-Frame"	1982	4	7	5	2	29	13	6	11	27	MC: Gold; RIAA: Gold	Freeze-Frame
"Angel in Blue"	1982	40	—	—	39	—	—	—	—	55		Freeze-Frame
"I Do" (live)	1982	24	—	—	30	—	—	—	—	—		Showtime!
"Land of a Thousand Dances" (live)	1983	60	—	—	—	—	—	—	—	—		Showtime!
"Concealed Weapons"	1984	63	—	—	—	—	—	—	—	—		You're Gettin' Even While I'm Gettin' Odd
"Fright Night"	1985	91	—	—	—	—	—	—	—	—		Fright Night soundtrack
"—" denotes a recording that did not chart or was not released in that territory.

== Other appearances ==
Year	Track name	Recorded	Release
1972	"Looking for a Love" (live)	April 3, 1972, Manatí, Puerto Rico	Mar Y Sol: The First International Puerto Rico Pop Festival

== See also ==
- List of artists who reached number one in the United States
- List of artists who reached number one on the Australian singles chart
