= Best of The J. Geils Band =

Best of the J. Geils Band

Greatest hits album by J. Geils Band
- Released: June 5, 1979
- Recorded: 1972–1977
- Genre: Rock
- Length: 38:37
- Label: Atlantic
- Producer: Allan Blazek; J. Geils; Geoffrey Haslam; Seth Justman; Bill Szymczyk

J. Geils Band chronology
Sanctuary (1978)	Best of the J. Geils Band (1979)	Love Stinks (1980)

Professional ratings
Review scores
Source	Rating
Allmusic	4/5 stars
Christgau's Record Guide	B−

Best of the J. Geils Band is the first Best Of album by American rock band The J. Geils Band, released in 1979.

== Track listing ==
1. "Southside Shuffle" (from Bloodshot) (Justman, Wolf) – 3:43
2. "Give It to Me" (from Bloodshot) (Justman, Wolf) – 6:27
3. "Where Did Our Love Go" [live] (from Blow Your Face Out) (Lamont Dozier, Brian Holland, Eddie Holland) – 3:55
4. "Ain't Nothin' But a House Party" (from Bloodshot) (Del Sharh, Joseph Thomas) – 4:43
5. "Detroit Breakdown" (from Nightmares...and Other Tales from the Vinyl Jungle) (Justman, Wolf) – 6:00
6. "Whammer Jammer" [live] (from Live Full House) (Juke Joint Jimmy) – 2:44
7. "I Do" (from Monkey Island) (Frank Paden, Johnny Paden, Jesse Smith, Willie Stephenson) – 3:09
8. "Must of Got Lost" (from Nightmares...and Other Tales from the Vinyl Jungle) (Justman, Wolf) – 2:53
9. "Looking for a Love" [live] (from Live Full House) (James Alexander, Zelda Samuels) – 5:03

== Personnel ==
- Peter Wolf – lead vocals
- J. Geils – guitar
- Magic Dick – harmonica
- Seth Justman – keyboards, vocals
- Danny Klein – bass
- Stephen Jo Bladd – drums, vocals

=== Production ===
- Producers: Allan Blazek, J. Geils, Geoffrey Haslam, Seth Justman, Bill Szymczyk
- Digital mastering: Barry Diament
- Arranger: J. Geils

== Charts ==
Chart (1979)	Peak position
US Billboard 200	129
