= Showtime (The J. Geils Band album) =

Showtime!

Live album by The J. Geils Band
- Released: November 12, 1982
- Recorded: September 4, 1982
- Venue: The Pine Knob Music Theater, Clarkston, Michigan
- Genre: Rock
- Length: 47:58
- Label: EMI
- Producer: Seth Justman

The J. Geils Band chronology
Freeze Frame (1981)	Showtime! (1982)	You're Gettin' Even While I'm Gettin' Odd (1984)

Singles from Showtime!
- 1. "I Do b/w "Sanctuary" Released: Fall 1982; 2. "Land of a Thousand Dances b/w "Jus' Can't Stop Me" Released: Winter 1983

Showtime! is the third and final live album by American rock band The J. Geils Band during their career. It was recorded at the Pine Knob Music Theater in Clarkston, Michigan on September 4, 1982. While some critics consider it to be weaker than the group's two earlier live albums "Live" Full House (1972) and Blow Your Face Out (1976), this release captures the band at its commercial peak. The tracks are drawn primarily from the four studio albums released since Blow Your Face Out: Monkey Island (1977); Sanctuary (1978); Love Stinks (1980); and Freeze Frame (1981). This was the last release by the band before frontman Peter Wolf's departure in 1983.

Professional ratings
Review scores
Source	Rating
AllMusic	3/5 stars
Rolling Stone	4/5 stars

== Track listing ==
All songs written by Seth Justman and Peter Wolf, except where noted.

Side one

1. "Jus' Can't Stop Me" (from Sanctuary) – 3:44
2. "Just Can't Wait" (from Love Stinks) – 3:27
3. "Till the Walls Come Tumblin' Down" (from Love Stinks) – 3:31
4. "Sanctuary" (from Sanctuary) – 3:49
5. "I'm Falling" (from Monkey Island) – 6:01
6. "Love Rap" – 5:14

Side two

1. "Love Stinks" (from Love Stinks) – 3:28
2. "Stoop Down #39" (from Nightmares...and Other Tales from the Vinyl Jungle) – 5:56
3. "I Do" (from Monkey Island) (Melvin Mason, Johnny Paden, Frank Paden, Jesse Smith, Willie Stephenson) – 3:04
4. "Centerfold" (from Freeze Frame) (Justman) – 4:03
5. "Land of a Thousand Dances" (Chris Kenner) – 5:41

On the LP version of the album, the segue between "Love Rap" and "Love Stinks" is divided with Peter Wolf cut off mid-sentence at the end of side 1: "If you call this love, then let me tell you, angel, love -". The beginning of side 2 picks up at the same second where side 1 left off, with Wolf finishing, "- stinks!".

== Personnel ==
The J. Geils Band

- Peter Wolf – lead vocals
- J. Geils – guitar
- Magic Dick – harmonicas, saxophone
- Seth Justman – keyboards, backing vocals
- Danny Klein – bass
- Stephen Jo Bladd – drums, backing vocals

The Uptown Horns

- Crispin Cioe – saxophone
- Arno Hecht – tenor saxophone
- Paul "Hollywood" Litteral – trumpet

=== Production ===
- Producer: Seth Justman
- Engineers: David Brown, Phil Gitomer, David Hewitt, Jon Mathias, Kooster McAllister, Frank Pavlich
- Mixing assistant: Steve Marcantonio
- Mastering: Joe Brescio
- Live sound engineer: Frank Pavlich
- Lighting: Dave Berndt
- Arranger: Seth Justman
- Art direction: Carin Goldberg
- Design: Carin Goldberg
- Illustrations: Leslie Cabarga
- Lettering: Leslie Cabarga
- Liner notes: John Tobler

== Charts ==
Album

Chart (1982)	Peak position
US Billboard 200	23

Singles

Year	Title	Chart	Position
1983	"I Do"	Billboard Hot 100	24
