= Blow Your Face Out =

Live album by the J. Geils Band
- Released: April 22, 1976
- Recorded: November 15 and 19, 1975
- Venues: Boston Garden, Boston; Cobo Arena, Detroit
- Genre: Rock
- Length: 74:39
- Label: Atlantic
- Producers: Bill Szymczyk; Allan Blazek; Seth Justman

The J. Geils Band chronology
Hotline (1975)	Blow Your Face Out (1976)	Monkey Island (1977)

Professional ratings
Review scores
Source	Rating
AllMusic	4.5/5 stars

Blow Your Face Out is the second live album by American rock band the J. Geils Band, released in 1976.

== Recording ==
The album was recorded at two concerts held in November 1975. The first show was at the Boston Garden in the band's hometown (Boston, Massachusetts) on November 15, and recorded by Record Plant East Remote with David Hewitt. The second was recorded by Metro Audio Detroit four nights later at Cobo Arena in Detroit, Michigan, the same city where the band's other two live albums "Live" Full House (1972) and Showtime! (1982) were recorded.

== Track listing ==
All songs written by Seth Justman and Peter Wolf, except where noted.

Side One

1. "Southside Shuffle" – 4:16
2. "Back to Get Ya" – 4:38
3. "Shoot Your Shot" (Junior Walker, James Graves, Lawrence Horn) – 3:56
4. "Must of Got Lost" – 6:34

Side Two

1. "Where Did Our Love Go" (Brian Holland, Lamont Dozier, Eddie Holland Jr.) – 4:00
2. "Truck Drivin' Man" (Terry Fell) – 1:52
3. "Love-Itis" (Harvey Scales, Albert Vance) – 4:05
4. "Lookin' for a Love" (J. W. Alexander, Zelda Samuels) – 2:06
5. "Ain't Nothin' but a Houseparty" (Del Sharh, Joe Thomas) – 5:04

Side Three

1. "So Sharp" (Arlester "Dyke" Christian) – 2:38
2. "Detroit Breakdown" – 6:25
3. "Chimes" – 8:56

Side Four

1. "Sno-Cone" (Albert Collins) – 3:04
2. "Wait" – 3:44
3. "Raise Your Hand" (Steve Cropper, Eddie Floyd, Alvertis Isbell) – 4:08
4. "Start All Over Again" – 2:21
5. "Give It to Me" – 6:52

The track listing on the original release has several incorrect song titles. "Must of Got Lost" is listed as "Musta Got Lost", "Lookin' for a Love" as "Intro:", "Start All Over Again" as "Start All Over", and "Ain't Nothin' but a Houseparty" as "Houseparty". "Musta Got Lost" is possibly a simple error, but the other two are seemingly stylistic choices, as the label on the record notes the real titles of the songs in parentheses.

== Personnel ==
- Peter Wolf – lead vocals
- J. Geils – guitar
- Magic Dick – harmonica
- Seth Justman – keyboards, backing vocals
- Danny Klein – bass
- Stephen Jo Bladd – drums, backing vocals, lead vocal on verse 3 and coda of "Raise Your Hand"

== Charts ==
Chart (1976)	Peak position
US Billboard 200	40
