= Monkey Island (album) =

Studio album by Geils
- Released: June 9, 1977
- Recorded: 1977
- Genre: Rock
- Length: 41:44
- Label: Atlantic
- Producer: The J. Geils Band

Geils chronology
| Blow Your Face Out (1976) | Monkey Island (1977) | Sanctuary (1978) |

Monkey Island is the seventh studio album by American rock band the J. Geils Band, though it is credited with the shortened band name of "Geils", the only album in their catalog for which this was done. The album was released on June 9, 1977, by Atlantic Records.

The album did not perform well in the marketplace, and would be the J. Geils Band's last original album for Atlantic Records after almost eight years with the label. It was, however, the band's first album on which they did not use an outside producer, as well as their first project with recording engineer David Thoener, with whom they later collaborated on their best-selling albums Love Stinks and Freeze Frame.

The album contains the studio version of "I Do," a live recording of which (from the album Showtime!) would be the J. Geils Band's last hit single in 1982.

== Critical reception ==
Professional ratings
Review scores
| Source | Rating |
|---|---|
| AllMusic | 3/5 stars |
| Christgau's Record Guide | B+ |
| Rolling Stone | (favorable) |

The Los Angeles Times opined that "Geils is in dire need of a well-focused musical approach if the band wishes to revive its early power and promise."

In a retrospective review, AllMusic held that Monkey Island's eclectic mix of styles makes it "one of their more interesting and challenging, if not most coherent, releases." They remarked that it retains the identifiable charm of the J. Geils Band and has a handful of good tracks, though they compared it unfavorably to its follow-up Sanctuary, which they said was both more commercially successful and truer to the J. Geils Band sound.

== Track listing ==
All songs written by Peter Wolf and Seth Justman except as noted.

Side one
| No. | Title | Writer(s) | Length |
|---|---|---|---|
| 1. | "Surrender" | | 3:49 |
| 2. | "You're the Only One" | | 3:05 |
| 3. | "I Do" | Melvin Mason, Johnny Paden, Frank Paden, Jesse Smith, Willie Stephenson | 3:09 |
| 4. | "Somebody" | | 5:13 |
| 5. | "I'm Falling" | | 5:41 |

Side two
| No. | Title | Writer(s) | Length |
|---|---|---|---|
| 6. | "Monkey Island" | | 9:02 |
| 7. | "I'm Not Rough" | Louis Armstrong | 3:03 |
| 8. | "So Good" | | 3:19 |
| 9. | "Wreckage" | | 5:23 |

== Personnel ==
- Peter Wolf – lead vocals
- Seth Justman – keyboards, backing vocals
- J. Geils – guitar
- Magic Dick – harmonicas, trumpet on "Monkey Island"
- Danny Klein – bass
- Stephen Jo Bladd – drums, backing vocals, lead vocal on "You're the Only One"

Additional personnel

- Michael Brecker, Ronnie Cuber, Lew Del Gatto, Frank Vicari – saxophones on "I Do", "I'm Falling", and "So Good"
  - Brecker is also specifically credited for the tenor solo on "I'm Falling"
- Randy Brecker, Alan Rubin, Lew Soloff – trumpets on "I Do", "I'm Falling", and "So Good"
- Cissy Houston – lead vocal on "Surrender"
- Luther Vandross, G. Diane Sumler, Michelle Cobbs, Theresa V. Reed – backing vocals on "Surrender" and "Monkey Island"
- Barbara Ingram, Evette Benton, Harriet Tharpe – backing vocals on "So Good"
- The J. Geils Band – string arrangements, horn arrangements
- Arif Mardin – strings conductor

Production

- Producers: The J. Geils Band
- Engineer: David Thoener
- Assistant engineers: Jay Krugman, Rod O'Brien, Corky Stasiak
- Mixing: David Thoener
- Remastering: George Marino
- Design: Peter Corriston
- Photography: Alen MacWeeney

== Charts ==
Album

| Chart (1977) | Peak position |
|---|---|
| US Billboard 200 | 51 |
| Australian (Kent Music Report) | 97 |

Singles

| Year | Single | Chart | Position |
|---|---|---|---|
| 1977 | "You're the Only One" | Pop Singles | 83 |
