= Hotline (The J. Geils Band album) =

Studio album by The J. Geils Band
- Released: September 9, 1975
- Studio: Record Plant Studios, New York City
- Genre: Rock, blues rock
- Length: 41:17
- Label: Atlantic
- Producer: Bill Szymczyk; Allan Blazek

The J. Geils Band chronology
Nightmares...and Other Tales from the Vinyl Jungle (1974)	Hotline (1975)	Blow Your Face Out (1976)

Hotline is the sixth studio album by American rock band The J. Geils Band. The album was released on September 9, 1975, by Atlantic Records.

The original record used novel packaging similar to a pop-up book, requiring owners to physically "pick up" the receiver from the printed telephone to remove the sleeve.

The intro of "Believe in Me" also became the intro tune to the German Rockpalast rock events.

Professional ratings
Review scores
Source	Rating
AllMusic	3.5/5 stars
Rolling Stone	(unfavorable)

== Track listing ==
Side one
No.	Title	Writer(s)	Length
1.	"Love-Itis"	Harvey Scales, Albert Vance	4:38
2.	"Easy Way Out"	Seth Justman, Peter Wolf	4:04
3.	"Think It Over"	Justman, Wolf	4:40
4.	"Be Careful (What You Do)"	John Brim	4:02
5.	"Jealous Love"	Justman, Wolf	4:09

Side two
No.	Title	Writer(s)	Length
6.	"Mean Love"	Justman, Wolf	5:04
7.	"Orange Driver"	Eddie "Guitar" Burns	4:29
8.	"Believe in Me"	Curtis Mayfield	4:42
9.	"Fancy Footwork"	Justman, Wolf	5:26

== Personnel ==
- Peter Wolf – lead vocals
- J. Geils – guitar
- Magic Dick – harmonica
- Seth Justman – keyboards, vocals
- Danny Klein – bass
- Stephen Jo Bladd – drums, vocals

=== Production ===
- Producers: Bill Szymczyk, Allan Blazek, Seth Justman
- Engineers: Allan Blazek, Bill Szymczyk, David Thoener
- Mastering: Alex Sadkin
- Digital mastering: Zal Schreiber
- Arranger: J. Geils Band
- Special assistance: Juke Joint Jimmy
- Design: Peter Corriston
- Cover design: Louis Brooks
- Cover art concept: Peter Corriston
- Photography: Juke Joint Jimmy

== Charts ==
Chart (1975)	Peak position
US Billboard 200	36
