= The J. Geils Band (album) =

Studio album by The J. Geils Band
- Released: November 16, 1970
- Recorded: August 1970
- Studios: A&R Studios, New York City
- Genre: Blues rock
- Length: 33:22
- Label: Atlantic
- Producers: Dave Crawford, Brad Shapiro

The J. Geils Band chronology
The J. Geils Band (1970)	The Morning After (1971)

The J. Geils Band is the debut studio album by American rock band The J. Geils Band. The album was released on November 16, 1970, by Atlantic Records.

== Critical reception ==
Professional ratings
Review scores
Source	Rating
AllMusic	4.5/5 stars
Christgau's Record Guide	B+
Rolling Stone	(favorable)

The band had once been known as the J. Geils Blues Band, but its debut album revealed the stylistic range it had long developed. In an effusive contemporary review, a journalist for rock magazine Creem praised the diversity and wrote: "It could be called blues, it could be called R&B, it could be called rock and roll; I prefer to call it good energetic music and leave it at that. They spent their formative years absorbing the best of all these musics and the sound they have distilled is truly their own."

== Track listing ==
Side one
No.	Title	Writer(s)	Length
1.	"Wait"	Seth Justman, Peter Wolf	3:25
2.	"Ice Breaker (For The Big "M")"	J. Geils	2:15
3.	"Cruisin' for a Love"	Juke Joint Jimmy	2:32
4.	"Hard Drivin' Man"	Wolf, Geils	2:18
5.	"Serves You Right to Suffer"	John Lee Hooker	5:01

Side two
No.	Title	Writer(s)	Length
6.	"Homework"	Otis Rush, Al Perkins, Dave Clark	2:45
7.	"First I Look at the Purse"	Robert Rogers, Smokey Robinson	3:54
8.	"What's Your Hurry"	Wolf, Justman	2:44
9.	"On Borrowed Time"	Wolf, Justman	3:03
10.	"Pack Fair and Square"	Big Walter Price	2:01
11.	"Sno-Cone"	Albert Collins	3:24

Juke Joint Jimmy is a pseudonym used by The J. Geils Band for group compositions.

== Personnel ==
=== The J. Geils Band ===
- Peter Wolf – lead vocals
- J. Geils – guitar
- Magic Dick – harmonica
- Seth Justman – piano, organ
- Danny Klein – bass
- Stephen Jo Bladd – drums, vocals

=== Technical ===
- Dave Crawford, Brad Shapiro – producers
- Jay Messina, Geoffrey Haslam – engineers
- Stephen Paley – photography
- Lloyd Ziff – design
- Fred Lewis – special assistance

== Charts ==
Chart (1970)	Peak position
US Billboard 200	195
