= Allan Blazek =

American record producer (died 2021)

Allan "Blaze" Blazek (January 18, 1950 – August 3, 2021) was a record producer, mixer, and audio engineer who had been active since the 1970s. A Michigan native of Czech ethnic heritage, Blazek produced albums by Glenn Frey, REO Speedwagon, Elvin Bishop, J. Geils Band, Michael Stanley, Fandango, the Outlaws and Mike Reilly. He also engineered the Who's album, Face Dances, and engineered the Eagles album, Hotel California. Blazek was born in New Buffalo, Michigan. He joined the army during the Vietnam War, where he developed an interest in records produced by Bill Szymczyk, who would later mentor him.

Blazek died at the age of 71 on August 3, 2021, in Michigan City, Indiana.

== Selected discography ==
1979

- Fandango – One Night Stand (producer, engineer)

1975

- Eagles – One of These Nights (engineer)
- Rick Derringer – Spring Fever (engineer)
- Elvin Bishop – Struttin' My Stuff (engineer, producer)
- REO Speedwagon – This Time We Mean It (engineer, producer)

1974

- J. Geils Band – Nightmares...and Other Tales from the Vinyl Jungle (engineer)
- Eagles – On the Border (assistant)
- Johnny Winter – Saints & Sinners (engineer)
- Wishbone Ash – There's the Rub (engineer)

1973

- J. Geils Band – Ladies Invited (engineer)
- Michael Stanley – Friends and Legends (engineer)
- The Fabulous Rhinestones – Freewheelin' (engineer)
- J. Geils Band – Bloodshot (Assistant producer)
- Rick Derringer – All American Boy (engineer)
