= Live Full House =

"Live" Full House

Live album by The J. Geils Band
- Released: September 26, 1972
- Recorded: April 21–22, 1972
- Venues: The Cinderella Ballroom, Detroit
- Genres: Blues, rock
- Length: 35:45 (incl. stage announcements and crowd noise)
- Label: Atlantic
- Producers: Geoffrey Haslam, J. Geils Band

The J. Geils Band chronology
The Morning After (1971)	"Live" Full House (1972)	Bloodshot (1973)

"Live" Full House is the first live album by American rock band The J. Geils Band, released in 1972.

The album peaked at No. 54 on the Billboard 200 album chart in the United States. The tracks "Looking for a Love" and "Serves You Right to Suffer" enjoyed considerable radio airplay, thus setting up the breakthrough success of the band's next album, 1973's Bloodshot. The album was cited as one of the top five live rock and roll albums of all time by Walter de Paduwa.

Professional ratings
Review scores
Source	Rating
AllMusic	link

== Recording ==
This was the first of three live albums recorded by the J. Geils Band. The others were Blow Your Face Out in 1976 and Showtime! in 1982.

Although living in Boston, the band had always considered Detroit their second home because of their enormous popularity there. The second live album "Blow Your Face Out" was recorded in Boston and Detroit, with the third and final live album "Showtime" being recorded at Pine Knob Music Theater in Clarkston, Michigan a suburb of Detroit.

== Track listing ==
=== Side one ===
1. "First I Look at the Purse" (Robert Rogers, Smokey Robinson) – 3:56
2. "Homework" (Dave Clark, Al Perkins, Otis Rush) – 2:34
3. "Pack Fair and Square" (Walter Travis Price) – 1:41
4. "Whammer Jammer" (Juke Joint Jimmy) – 2:21
5. "Hard Drivin' Man" (J. Geils, Peter Wolf) – 4:23

=== Side two ===
1. "Serves You Right to Suffer" (John Lee Hooker) – 9:32
2. "Cruisin' for a Love" (Juke Joint Jimmy) – 3:32
3. "Looking for a Love" (J. W. Alexander, Zelda Samuels) – 4:55

== Personnel ==
The J. Geils Band

- Peter Wolf – lead vocals
- J. Geils – guitar
- Magic Dick – harmonica
- Seth Justman – keyboards
- Danny Klein – bass
- Stephen Jo Bladd – drums, vocals

Production

- Producers: Geoffrey Haslam, J. Geils Band
- Engineer: Geoffrey Haslam
- Live mixing: Dinky Dawson
- Arranger: J. Geils

== Charts ==
Chart (1972)	Peak position
US Billboard 200	54
