= Sanctuary (The J. Geils Band album) =

Studio album by the J. Geils Band
- Released: November 1978
- Recorded: Longview Farms, North Brookfield, Massachusetts; Record Plant Studios, New York City
- Genre: Rock
- Length: 36:52
- Label: EMI
- Producer: Joe Wissert

The J. Geils Band chronology
Monkey Island (1977)	Sanctuary (1978)	Best of The J. Geils Band (1979)

Sanctuary is the eighth studio album by American rock band the J. Geils Band. The album was released in November 1978 and is the first released by EMI Records.

A 1998 re-release on the Razor & Tie label added two bonus tracks, taken from the 1982 live album Showtime!

== Critical reception ==
Professional ratings
Review scores
Source	Rating
AllMusic	4/5 stars
Christgau's Record Guide	B−
Rolling Stone	(favorable)

Cash Box said that the single "Take It Back" is "good-time rock 'n' roll" with "a swinging handclap beat, pithy piano fills, [and] Magic Dick harmonica licks." Record World praised the organ and harmonica playing.

== Track listing ==
All songs written by Seth Justman and Peter Wolf, except where noted.

Side one
No.	Title	Length
1.	"I Could Hurt You"	3:53
2.	"One Last Kiss"	4:19
3.	"Take It Back"	3:18
4.	"Sanctuary"	3:50
5.	"Teresa"	3:46

Side two
No.	Title	Length
6.	"Wild Man"	5:22
7.	"I Can't Believe You"	4:11
8.	"I Don't Hang Around Much Anymore"	4:37
9.	"Jus' Can't Stop Me"	3:36

Bonus tracks
No.	Title	Writer(s)	Length
10.	"I Do (Live)"	Melvin Mason, Johnny Paden, Frank Paden, Jesse Smith, Willie Stephenson	3:22
11.	"Land of a Thousand Dances"	Chris Kenner	3:27

== Personnel ==
- Peter Wolf – lead vocals
- J. Geils – guitar
- Magic Dick – harmonica
- Seth Justman – keyboards, backing vocals, lead vocal on chorus of "Teresa"
- Danny Klein – bass
- Stephen Jo Bladd – drums, backing vocals, lead vocal on finale of "I Can't Believe You"

=== Production ===
- Producer: Joseph Wissert
- Engineer: David Thoener
- Assistant engineers: Jesse Henderson, Steve Satter, Jon Mathias
- Mixing: David Thoener
- Mastering: Joe Brescio, Elliot Federman
- Project director: Mike Ragogna
- Production coordination: David Richman
- Arranger: Seth Justman
- Layout design: Paula Bisacca
- Photography: Alen MacWeeney, Rob Van Petten
- Liner notes: John Tobler

== Charts ==
Album

Chart (1979)	Peak position
US Billboard 200	49
Australian (Kent Music Report)	82

Singles

Year	Single	Chart	Position
1979	"One Last Kiss"	Pop Singles	35
1979	"Take It Back"	Pop Singles	67
