= The Morning After (The J. Geils Band album) =

1971 studio album

Studio album by The J. Geils Band
- Released: October 1971
- Studios: Record Plant West, Los Angeles
- Genres: Blues rock, boogie rock
- Length: 34:37
- Label: Atlantic
- Producer: Bill Szymczyk

The J. Geils Band chronology
The J. Geils Band (1970)	The Morning After (1971)	Live Full House (1972)

Professional ratings
Review scores
Source	Rating
AllMusic	4/5 stars
Christgau's Record Guide	B−
Rolling Stone	(favorable)

The Morning After is the second studio album by American rock band The J. Geils Band. The album was released in October 1971, by Atlantic Records. The song "Cry One More Time" was later covered by Gram Parsons on his first solo album.

== Track listing ==
Side one
No.	Title	Writer(s)	Length
1.	"I Don't Need You No More"	Peter Wolf, Seth Justman	2:36
2.	"Whammer Jammer" (instrumental)	Juke Joint Jimmy	2:37
3.	"So Sharp"	Arlester Christian	3:10
4.	"The Usual Place"	Don Covay, Leroy Randolph	2:45
5.	"Gotta Have Your Love"	Wolf, Justman	4:32

Side two
No.	Title	Writer(s)	Length
6.	"Looking for a Love"	J. W. Alexander, Zelda Samuels	3:47
7.	"Gonna Find Me a New Love"	Wolf, Justman	3:24
8.	"Cry One More Time"	Wolf, Justman	3:23
9.	"Floyd's Hotel"	Wolf, Justman	3:11
10.	"It Ain't What You Do (It's How You Do It!)"	Juke Joint Jimmy	5:12

Juke Joint Jimmy is a pseudonym used by The J. Geils Band for group compositions.

== Personnel ==
=== The J. Geils Band ===
- Peter Wolf – lead vocals
- J. Geils – guitar
- Magic Dick – harmonica
- Seth Justman – keyboards
- Danny Klein – bass
- Stephen Jo Bladd – drums, vocals

=== Technical ===
- Seth Justman – producer
- Bill Szymczyk – producer, engineer
- George Marino – digital remastering
- Stephen Paley – photography
- Sam Cooperstein – design
- Fred Lewis – special assistance

== Charts ==
Album

Chart (1971)	Peak position
US Billboard 200	64

Singles

Year	Single	Chart	Position
1972	"Looking for a Love"	Billboard Pop Singles	39
