= You're Gettin' Even While I'm Gettin' Odd =

Studio album by the J. Geils Band
- Released: October 5, 1984
- Recorded: 1983
- Studio: Long View Farm, Brookfield, Massachusetts, US
- Genre: Rock
- Length: 43:58
- Label: EMI
- Producer: Seth Justman

The J. Geils Band chronology
Showtime! (1982)	You're Gettin' Even While I'm Gettin' Odd (1984)

Professional ratings
Review scores
Source	Rating
AllMusic	2/5 stars
Robert Christgau	B−
The Rolling Stone Album Guide	2.5/5 stars

You're Gettin' Even While I'm Gettin' Odd is the eleventh and final studio album by American rock band the J. Geils Band and the only one recorded without singer Peter Wolf. The band's keyboardist Seth Justman produced the album, did all the song and horn arrangements, wrote all the songs with lyrical help from Paul Justman, and provided the majority of the album's lead vocals, with drummer Stephen Jo Bladd singing lead on three tracks. Compared to the band's earlier works, which leaned towards a more live rock band sound, You're Gettin' Even While I'm Gettin' Odd emphasizes overdubbing and production. The album was released on October 5, 1984, by EMI Records.

The album contained one single, "Concealed Weapons", which peaked at No. 63 on the Billboard Hot 100 chart. Cash Box said of "Concealed Weapons" that "J. Geils here rocks hard and with a contemporary feeling on a track that makes a statement of sorts against its title." Billboard called it a "playful rock 'n' roll stomper."

== Track listing ==
All music written by Seth Justman, lyrics written by Seth and Paul Justman.

No.	Title	Length
1.	"Concealed Weapons"	3:30
2.	"Heavy Petting"	4:16
3.	"Wasted Youth"	4:30
4.	"Eenie, Meenie, Minie, Moe"	3:54
5.	"Tell 'Em, Jonesy"	4:46
6.	"You're Gettin' Even While I'm Gettin' Odd"	6:56
7.	"The Bite from Inside"	5:50
8.	"Californicatin'"	4:07
9.	"I Will Carry You Home"	6:09

== Personnel ==
The J. Geils Band

- Seth Justman – keyboards, lead (1, 3–8) and backing vocals, spoken word (5)
- J. Geils – guitars
- Danny Klein – bass guitar, "flex bass"
- Magic Dick – harmonicas (7, 8), soprano saxophone, backing vocals
- Stephen Jo Bladd – drums, lead (2, 4, 9) and backing vocals

The Uptown Horns

- Crispin Cioe – alto and baritone saxophones
- Arno Hecht – tenor saxophone
- Paul Litteral – trumpet

Additional personnel

- Phoebe Snow – backing vocal (4)
- Cookie Watkins, Fonda Rae, and Judith Spears – backing vocals (2, 4, 6, 9)
- The Institutional Radio Choir (directed by Carl Williams, Jr.) – backing vocals (9)
- Jim Donnelly – backing vocals

== Charts ==
Album

Chart (1984)	Peak position
US Billboard 200	80

Singles

Year	Title	Chart	Position
1984	"Concealed Weapons"	Billboard Hot 100	63
1984	"Concealed Weapons"	Billboard Top Rock Tracks	26
