= Ladies Invited =

Studio album by The J. Geils Band
- Released: November 9, 1973
- Studio: The Hit Factory, New York City
- Genre: Rock
- Length: 41:16
- Label: Atlantic
- Producer: Bill Szymczyk

The J. Geils Band chronology
Bloodshot (1973)	Ladies Invited (1973)	Nightmares...and Other Tales from the Vinyl Jungle (1974)

Professional ratings
Review scores
Source	Rating
AllMusic	3.5/5 stars
Christgau's Record Guide	B
Rolling Stone	(favorable)

Ladies Invited is the fourth studio album by American rock band The J. Geils Band. The album was released in November 1973, by Atlantic Records.

The models for the cover artwork, illustrated by the noted fashion artist Antonio using makeup, were model Jerry Hall and actress Faye Dunaway, who married lead singer Peter Wolf the following year.

Record World said of the single "Did You No Wrong" that "Geils takes off on some incredible guitar riffs and production from Szymczyk does no wrong."

== Track listing ==
All tracks are written by Peter Wolf and Seth Justman.

Side one
No.	Title	Length
1.	"Did You No Wrong"	4:08
2.	"I Can't Go On"	5:04
3.	"Lay Your Good Thing Down"	4:32
4.	"That's Why I'm Thinking of You"	3:13
5.	"No Doubt About It"	3:40

Side two
No.	Title	Length
6.	"The Lady Makes Demands"	4:21
7.	"My Baby Don't Love Me"	3:42
8.	"Diddyboppin'"	3:31
9.	"Take a Chance (On Romance)"	3:55
10.	"Chimes"	5:04

== Personnel ==
- Peter Wolf – lead vocals
- J. Geils – guitar
- Magic Dick – harmonica
- Seth Justman – keyboards, vocals
- Danny Klein – bass
- Stephen Jo Bladd – drums, vocals

=== Production ===
- Producer: Bill Szymczyk
- Engineers: Allan Blazek, Bill Szymczyk
- Mastering: Zal Schreiber
- Special assistance: Juke Joint Jimmy
- Arrangers: J. Geils Band
- Personal managers: Stephen Bladd, Danny Klein
- Design: Ira Friedlander, Douglas T. Slade
- Cover design: Antonio, Douglas T. Slade
- Photography: Robert Agriopoulos
- Illustrations: Antonio

== Charts ==
Chart (1973)	Peak position
US Billboard 200	51
