= Cruella (soundtrack) =

2021 film score by Nicholas Britell

Cruella: Original Motion Picture Soundtrack is the soundtrack album to the film of the same name. It was released on May 21, 2021, by Walt Disney Records. A separate film score album, titled Cruella: Original Score and composed by Nicholas Britell, was released on the same day, under the same label.

== Background ==
On March 31, 2021, it was announced that Nicholas Britell was hired to compose the score for Cruella. "Call Me Cruella", an original song performed by Florence and the Machine, is featured in the film's end credits. The score album and a separate soundtrack album for the film were released on May 21, 2021 by Walt Disney Records.

== Albums ==
=== Cruella: Original Motion Picture Soundtrack ===
Cruella: Original Motion Picture Soundtrack

Soundtrack album by Various artists
- Released: May 21, 2021
- Recorded: 2021
- Genre: Rock; new wave; jazz; funk; pop
- Length: 51:34
- Label: Walt Disney Records
- Producer: Craig Gillespie; Susan Jacobs

Singles from Cruella: Original Motion Picture Soundtrack
- 1. "Call Me Cruella" Released: May 21, 2021

==== Track listing ====
| No. | Title | Writer(s) | Producer(s) | Length |
|---|---|---|---|---|
| 1. | "Call Me Cruella" (Florence and the Machine) | Florence Welch; Jordan Powers; Nicholas Britell; Steph Jones; Taura Stinson | Britell | 2:07 |
| 2. | "Bloody Well Right" (Supertramp) | Rick Davies; Roger Hodgson | Supertramp; Ken Scott | 4:34 |
| 3. | "Whisper, Whisper" (Bee Gees) | Barry Gibb; Maurice Gibb; Robin Gibb | Bee Gees; Robert Stigwood | 3:25 |
| 4. | "Five to One" (The Doors) | Jim Morrison; John Densmore; Ray Manzarek; Robby Krieger | The Doors | 4:25 |
| 5. | "Feeling Good" (Nina Simone) | Leslie Bricusse; Anthony Newley | Hal Mooney | 2:54 |
| 6. | "Fire" (Ohio Players) | Billy Beck; Leroy Bonner; Marshall Jones; Ralph Middlebrooks; Marvin Pierce; Clarence Satchell; James Williams | Ohio Players | 4:35 |
| 7. | "Whole Lotta Love" (Ike & Tina Turner) | John Bonham; Willie Dixon; John Paul Jones; Jimmy Page; Robert Plant | Denny Diante; Spencer Proffer | 4:42 |
| 8. | "Livin' Thing" (2012 version; Electric Light Orchestra) | Jeff Lynne | Lynne | 3:42 |
| 9. | "Stone Cold Crazy" (Queen) | Freddie Mercury; Brian May; Roger Taylor; John Deacon | Roy Thomas Baker; Queen | 2:15 |
| 10. | "One Way or Another" (Blondie) | Debbie Harry; Nigel Harrison | Mike Chapman | 3:34 |
| 11. | "Should I Stay or Should I Go" (The Clash) | Topper Headon; Mick Jones; Paul Simonon; Joe Strummer | The Clash | 3:09 |
| 12. | "I Love Paris" (Georgia Gibbs) | Cole Porter | Ron Furmanek | 2:31 |
| 13. | "Love Is Like a Violin" (Ken Dodd) | Jimmy Kennedy; Miarka Laparcerie | | 2:10 |
| 14. | "I Wanna Be Your Dog" (John McCrea) | Dave Alexander; Iggy Pop; Ron Asheton; Scott Asheton | John Cale | 3:56 |
| 15. | "Come Together" (Ike & Tina Turner) | Lennon–McCartney | Ike Turner | 3:37 |
| Total length: | | | | 51:34 |

==== Songs featured in the film but not featured on the film's soundtrack album ====
The following songs appear in the film but are excluded from the soundtrack:

- "Inside-Looking Out" by the Animals
- "She's a Rainbow", by the Rolling Stones
- "Watch the Dog That Bring the Bone", by Sandy Gaye
- "Time of the Season" by the Zombies
- "I Gotcha" by Joe Tex
- "These Boots Are Made for Walkin'" by Nancy Sinatra
- "The Wild One" by Suzi Quatro
- "Hush" by Deep Purple
- "Car Wash" by Rose Royce
- "Boys Keep Swinging" by David Bowie
- "I Get Ideas" by Tony Martin
- "Theme from A Summer Place" by Norrie Paramor and his Orchestra
- "Perhaps, Perhaps, Perhaps", by Doris Day
- "You're Such a Good Looking Woman" by Joe Dolan
- "Smile" by Judy Garland
- "Nightmares" by the J. Geils Band
- "Gettin' Out" by the J. Geils Band
- "Eternelle" by Brigitte Fontaine
- "The Wizard" by Black Sabbath
- "Sympathy for the Devil" by the Rolling Stones

Chart performance for Cruella: Original Motion Picture Soundtrack
| Chart (2021) | Peak position |
|---|---|
| Australian Albums (ARIA) | 54 |
| UK Album Downloads (OCC) | 24 |
| UK Soundtrack Albums (OCC) | 2 |
| US Top Soundtracks (Billboard) | 7 |

=== Cruella: Original Score ===
Cruella: Original Score

Film score by Nicholas Britell
- Released: May 21, 2021
- Recorded: 2021
- Genre: Film score
- Length: 50:49
- Label: Walt Disney Records
- Producer: Nicholas Britell

Nicholas Britell chronology
| The Underground Railroad (2021) | Cruella (2021) | Don't Look Up (2021) |

==== Track listing ====
All music is composed by Nicholas Britell, except where noted.

| No. | Title | Writer(s) | Artist(s) | Length |
|---|---|---|---|---|
| 1. | "Call Me Cruella" | Florence Welch; Jordan Powers; Nicholas Britell; Steph Jones; Taura Stinson | Florence and the Machine | 2:07 |
| 2. | "Cruella – Disney Castle Logo" | | | 0:45 |
| 3. | "The Baroque Ball" | | | 2:01 |
| 4. | "The Most Dreadful Accident" | | | 1:18 |
| 5. | "The Drive to London" | | | 1:36 |
| 6. | "Red Hair Dye" | | | 0:24 |
| 7. | "The Baroness Needs Looks" | | | 1:08 |
| 8. | "I Think You're Something" | | | 2:10 |
| 9. | "Everything's Going So Well" | | | 0:41 |
| 10. | "The Necklace" | | | 1:33 |
| 11. | "The Angle" | | | 1:10 |
| 12. | "Surveillance" | | | 1:44 |
| 13. | "I Like to Make an Impact" | | | 1:52 |
| 14. | "Oh, That's a Hybrid" | | | 1:43 |
| 15. | "Revenge / Let's Begin" | | | 3:38 |
| 16. | "Putting the Dresses in the Safe" | | | 0:42 |
| 17. | "Get It Open / Moths" | | | 1:50 |
| 18. | "Oh, That's Why You're Peeved" | | | 2:47 |
| 19. | "The True Story of Cruella's Birth" | | | 1:55 |
| 20. | "I'm Cruella" | | | 4:21 |
| 21. | "A Great Tribute / She's Here" | | | 3:45 |
| 22. | "The Cliff" | | | 4:33 |
| 23. | "She Jumped!" | | | 0:50 |
| 24. | "Goodbye, Estella" | | | 1:51 |
| 25. | "Call me Cruella" (instrumental version) | | | 2:06 |
| 26. | "Orchestral Waltz" (bonus track) | | | 2:09 |
| Total length: | | | | 50:49 |
