= Come Back (The J. Geils Band song) =

- Dutch single cover

Single by the J. Geils Band

from the album Love Stinks
- B-side: "Takin' You Down"
- Released: January 1980
- Recorded: 1979
- Studio: Long View Farm, North Brookfield, Massachusetts
- Genre: Rock, new wave, disco
- Length: 5:10 (album version); 3:32 (single edit)
- Label: EMI
- Songwriters: Peter Wolf, Seth Justman
- Producer: Seth Justman

The J. Geils Band singles chronology
| "Sanctuary" (1979) | "Come Back" (1980) | "Love Stinks" (1980) |

Music video
- "Come Back" on YouTube

"Come Back" is a song by the J. Geils Band, appearing on their 1980 album Love Stinks. "Come Back" was the first single from the album, and reached the US Top 40, peaking at No. 32 and remaining in the Top 40 for five weeks. It peaked at No. 19 for two weeks in Canada. It also made Billboard's Club Play Singles chart, peaking at No. 69. The song remains in the rotation of classic rock radio stations.

Seth Justman provides extensive keyboards, which Associated Press critic James Simon feels gives the song "a little extra zing."

Rolling Stone critic Dave Marsh praised "Come Back" as a "full-scale showcase" for the band, claiming that it came "very close to the topnotch hard rock Geils has always threatened to make and too rarely delivered." On the other hand, in the 4th edition of The New Rolling Stone Album Guide, critic Rob Sheffield calls the song a "failed Eurodisco experiment." Boston Globe critic Steve Morse describes the song as "discoish." Bill Flanagan, writing in the Boston Globe remarked that although "Come Back" has an "upbeat surface," the song conveys the anxiety that lurks below. Craig Allen of NJ 101.5 describes the song as an "overlooked 1980 J. Geils gem." Cash Box said it has "an insistent dance beat is surrounded by rapid-fire electronics," but still retains "a hard ‘n’ heavy guitar sound." Record World said that the song "has an exciting dance beat" and that "vocals & surging keyboards are tops." Ultimate Classic Rock critic Michael Gallucci rated it to be the band's 10th greatest song, saying that was "Eurodisco-inspired" and loaded with "contemporary-sounding [keyboards]."

Subsequent to its initial appearance on Love Stinks, "Come Back" was released on several J. Geils Band compilation albums, including Flashback: The Best of the J. Geils Band, Centerfold, The Very Best J. Geils Band Album Ever and Best of The J. Geils Band. In the Netherlands, it was also released as the B-side of the 12" maxi-single "Centerfold."

Full House, a band that includes former J. Geils Band bassist Danny Klein, covers "Come Back" in concert.

== Chart performance ==
| Chart (1980) | Peak position |
|---|---|
| Australia (Kent Music Report) | 31 |
| Canada RPM Top Singles | 19 |
| U.S. Billboard Hot 100 | 32 |
| U.S. Billboard Hot Dance Club Play | 69 |
| U.S. Cashbox Top 100 | 32 |
