= Bloodshot (The J. Geils Band album) =

Studio album by the J. Geils Band
- Released: April 12, 1973
- Studios: The Hit Factory, New York City
- Genre: Blues rock
- Length: 36:45
- Label: Atlantic
- Producer: Bill Szymczyk

The J. Geils Band chronology
Live Full House (1972)	Bloodshot (1973)	Ladies Invited (1973)

Professional ratings
Review scores
Source	Rating
AllMusic	4/5 stars
Christgau's Record Guide	C+
Rolling Stone	(favorable)

Bloodshot is the third studio album by American rock band the J. Geils Band. The album was released on April 12, 1973, by Atlantic Records. It was the breakthrough release for the band, reaching No. 10 on the Billboard 200 album chart in the United States, a peak that the band would not surpass until their 1981 multi-platinum album Freeze Frame. The single version of "Give it to Me", which had a very different ending from the album version, reached No. 30 on the U.S. Billboard Hot 100 and No. 15 on the Cash Box Top 100.

Original US vinyl copies of Bloodshot were issued using red vinyl instead of the customary black, and utilized matching red 1950s style Atlantic Records labels. The band would continue to use these vintage-style Atlantic labels, in different colors with each album release, throughout their remaining tenure with the label.

== Track listing ==
All tracks are written by Seth Justman and Peter Wolf, except where noted.

Side one
No.	Title	Writer(s)	Length
1.	"(Ain't Nothin' but a) House Party"	Del Sharh, Joseph Thomas	4:43
2.	"Make Up Your Mind"		3:31
3.	"Back to Get Ya"		5:22
4.	"Struttin' with My Baby"		3:16
5.	"Don't Try to Hide It"		2:45

Side two
No.	Title	Writer(s)	Length
6.	"Southside Shuffle"		3:43
7.	"Hold Your Loving"	Bernice Snelson, Titus Turner	2:30
8.	"Start All Over Again"		4:15
9.	"Give It to Me"		6:32

== Personnel ==
- Peter Wolf – lead vocals
- J. Geils – guitar
- Magic Dick – harmonica
- Seth Justman – keyboards, backing vocals
- Danny Klein – bass
- Stephen Jo Bladd – drums, percussion, backing vocals

Additional personnel

- Mike Hunt – saxophone on "Don't Try to Hide It"

Production

- Bill Szymczyk – producer, engineer
- Allan Blazek – assistant producer
- George Marino – digital remastering
- Juke Joint Jimmy – special assistance
- The J. Geils Band – arranging
- Richard Mantel – design
- David Gahr – photography

== Charts ==
Album

Chart (1973)	Peak position
US Billboard 200	10

Singles

Year	Single	Chart	Position
1973	"Give It to Me"	Pop Singles	30
1973	"Make Up Your Mind"	Pop Singles	98
