= Cambridge Harmonica Orchestra =

American harmonica orchestra in Cambridge, MA

- Orchestra
- Short name: CHO
- Founded: 1981; 45 years ago
- Location: Cambridge, Massachusetts, United States
- Music director: Pierre Beauregard

The Cambridge Harmonica Orchestra was a unique ensemble that grew to include more than 300 harmonica players. Founded by Otis Read, the Cambridge Harmonica Orchestra was directed by Pierre Beauregard and active from 1981 through 1986. They performed a wide range of Jazz and Blues harp as well as classical and popular tunes.

== Founding ==
The Cambridge Harmonica Orchestra, or CHO, was the brainchild of harmonica player Otis Read. In 1981 he applied for and received a $200 grant from the City of Cambridge, Massachusetts and founded the orchestra as a group of 30 musicians. The orchestra included Blues harmonica player Pierre Beauregard of Boston, who arranged 25 songs for the group to play at a 1982 convocation that brought together 48 musicians from Massachusetts, New Hampshire, Rhode Island and Washington, DC, for a performance so unique it was recorded and aired on the Today Show. They were later featured in the January, 1983 Hohner company harmonica catalog.

By the end of 1983 the orchestra numbered around 350 members. Regional directors included Michael Basdavanos of Arlington, Virginia, who organized the Washington area contingent.

== Types of instruments ==
The Cambridge Harmonica Orchestra involved every different type of harmonica, including bass harmonica, chromatic and chord harmonica sections, a diatonic harmonica section, and a chordamonica, which has a double button chromatic setup.

Also playing with the Cambridge Orchestra were an accordion section, melodicas, several drummers, a musician who played the bones, a washboard, and a washtub bass, for texture. Some singers also joined the Orchestra for performances.

== Notable broadcast and live performances ==
The first performance of the Cambridge Harmonica Orchestra was at the Cambridge River Festival, to which they returned in years following.

The Cambridge Harmonica Orchestra appeared on Brian Gumbel's Today show in 1982.

Also in 1982 they played to a packed crowd at The Tam, as the Tam O'Shanter club was known, in the Washington Square area of Boston, MA. The orchestra numbers around 90 players at the time but only 47 made it for the performance.

The following year a small selection of Christmas songs released by the CHO aired on the Voice of America in programming aimed at Poland, Russia and Palestine. Songs from their single release included "Joy to the World," "Silent Night," and "Jingle Bell Boogie."

In 1983, Otis Reed was invited to participate on the Canadian game show, “Whats My Line” which was the Canadian version of the American hit game show “To Tell The Truth”. The objective of the game show was for celebrity contestants to guess the notable achievement of a mystery guest. Otis Reed and the Cambridge Harmonica Orchestra traveled to Ottawa, Canada for the filming of the show. The orchestra members rode in a yellow school bus from Cambridge, Massachusetts to the Ottawa television studio. Otis Reed was given a false identity as the organizer of the largest game of musical chairs in Central Park, New York City which was a “world record”. Through a series of questions, the celebrity guests successfully identified Otis's actual unique achievement of founding the harmonica orchestra. During the show taping, the orchestra group of about 30 musicians had been waiting back stage. After Otis was identified, the orchestra performed for the studio audience marching through the theater stands following the lead of Pierre Beauregard.

== Recordings ==
In 1983, "Silent Night" and "Joy to the World," featuring about 80 CHO members, were recorded live in a Cambridge garage. "Jingle Bell Boogie" was a studio cut with a smaller group of 33 players. A limited pressing was produced on the orchestra's own Bent Reeds label.

== Notable members ==
Orchestra leader Pierre Beauregard was a member of the Memphis Rockabilly Band, a popular band that, despite its name, was based in Boston.

Magic Dick (Richard Salwitz) was a member of The J. Geils Band. Salwitz and Beauregard co-invented and patented a harmonica design they called the "Magic Harmonica."

Howard McDonald, who was in the orchestra, had been the breathing therapist for Ronald Reagan, who played a harmonica as part of his recovery from being shot through the lung in a 1981 assassination attempt.

James Montgomery, an orchestra soloist, was the leader of the James Montgomery Band.

Mr. Bones was a world-famous bones player who was part of the orchestra.

The Golden Age Harmonica Band was a group of players over 70 who participated in the Cambridge Orchestra rehearsals and performances.
