= One Last Kiss (The J. Geils Band song) =

Single by The J. Geils Band

from the album Sanctuary
- B-side: "I Can't Believe You (UK), Revenge (US)"
- Released: USA: 13 Nov 1978; UK: 11 May 1979
- Recorded: Longview Farms, North Brookfield, Massachusetts, Record Plant Studios, New York City
- Genre: Rock
- Length: 4:22
- Label: EMI America
- Songwriter(s): Peter Wolf, Seth Justman
- Producer(s): Joe Wissert

The J. Geils Band singles chronology
"I Do" (1977)	"One Last Kiss" (1978)	"Take it Back" (1979)

"One Last Kiss" is a song by the American rock band The J. Geils Band. It is the band's first single on EMI America.

== Background ==
The song's architecture is a slight departure from the band's stock in trade of 120 bpm or less and prominent piano and organ in the mix. Cash Box said that it "opens with majestic guitar work."

== Chart performance ==
=== Weekly charts ===
Chart (1978–79)	Peak position
Canada RPM	58
U.S. Billboard Hot 100	35
UK	74
