= Give It to Me (The J. Geils Band song) =

Single by The J. Geils Band

from the album Bloodshot
- B-side: "Hold Your Loving"
- Released: March 1973
- Recorded: The Hit Factory, New York City
- Genre: Rock, funk rock, reggae fusion
- Length: 6:32 (album version); 3:07 (single edit)
- Label: Atlantic Records
- Songwriters: Peter Wolf, Seth Justman
- Producer: Bill Szymczyk

The J. Geils Band singles chronology
"Hard Drivin' Man (Live)" (1972)	"Give It to Me" (1973)	"Make Up Your Mind" (1973)

"Give It to Me" is a song by the American rock band The J. Geils Band. It was the band's first single to reach the Top 30 in the United States and the last song from the album Bloodshot.

== Chart performance ==
=== Weekly charts ===
Chart (1973)	Peak position
Canada RPM Top Singles	39
U.S. Cash Box Top 100	15
U.S. Billboard Hot 100	30
