= Love Stinks (album) =

Studio album by the J. Geils Band
- Released: January 28, 1980
- Recorded: 1979
- Studio: Long View Farm, North Brookfield, Massachusetts
- Genre: Rock; new wave
- Length: 37:34
- Label: EMI
- Producer: Seth Justman

The J. Geils Band chronology
Best of the J. Geils Band (1979)	Love Stinks (1980)	Freeze Frame (1981)

Singles from Love Stinks
- 1. "Come Back" b/w "Takin' You Down" Released: 1980; 2. "Love Stinks" b/w "Till the Walls Come Tumblin' Down" Released: 1980; 3. "Just Can't Wait" b/w "No Anchovies, Please" Released: 1980

Love Stinks is the ninth studio album by American rock band the J. Geils Band. The album was released on January 28, 1980, by EMI Records.

The title song, "Love Stinks", is a rant against unrequited love. It has been covered by industrial metal band Bile, by Andru Branch in the film Love Stinks, Joan Jett in the film Mr. Wrong and Adam Sandler in the film The Wedding Singer.

== Critical reception ==
Professional ratings
Review scores
Source	Rating
AllMusic	3.5/5 stars
Robert Christgau	C+
Record Mirror	2/5 stars
Rolling Stone	(mixed)

Cash Box said that the single "Just Can't Wait" has "earthy old wave rock guitar riffing, with a souped up synthesized farfisa organ sound." Record World called it "certified boogie music with a hook that will grab summer listeners." Classic Rock History critic Brian Kachejian named "Just Can't Wait" as the band's 7th best song, stating that "The song’s Farfisa organ lick was very symbolic of the sound of the early 1980s, when all styles of music were merging into a new wave-type sound."

== Track listing ==
All songs written by Peter Wolf and Seth Justman, except where noted.

Side one
No.	Title	Writer(s)	Length
1.	"Just Can't Wait"		3:24
2.	"Come Back"		5:11
3.	"Takin' You Down"		4:05
4.	"Night Time"	Bob Feldman, Jerry Goldstein, Richard Gottehrer	4:31
5.	"No Anchovies, Please"		2:41

Side two
No.	Title	Length
6.	"Love Stinks"	3:44
7.	"Tryin' Not to Think About It"	6:22
8.	"Desire (Please Don't Turn Away)"	3:35
9.	"Till the Walls Come Tumblin' Down"	4:01

== Personnel ==
- Peter Wolf – lead vocals, voice of Don on "No Anchovies, Please"
- J. Geils – guitar
- Magic Dick – harmonicas, alto sax
- Seth Justman – keyboards, backing vocals, narration on "No Anchovies, Please"
- Danny Klein – bass
- Stephen Jo Bladd – drums, backing vocals

=== Production ===
- Producer: Seth Justman
- Engineer: David Thoener
- Mixing: David Thoener
- Mastering: Joe Brescio
- Studio assistant: Jesse Henderson
- Arranger: Seth Justman
- Art direction: Carin Goldberg
- Design: Carin Goldberg, Mark Handel
- Photography: Cadence Industries Corp.

== Charts ==
Album

Chart (1980)	Peak position
US Billboard 200	18
Australian (Kent Music Report)	43

Singles

Year	Single	Chart	Position
1980	"Come Back	US Pop Singles	32
1980	"Come Back"	US Club Play Singles	69
1980	"Just Can't Wait"	US Pop Singles	78
1980	"Love Stinks"	US Pop Singles	38
