= Nightmares...and Other Tales from the Vinyl Jungle =

Studio album by The J. Geils Band
- Released: September 25, 1974
- Studio: Record Plant Studios and The Hit Factory, New York City
- Genre: Rock
- Length: 40:47
- Label: Atlantic
- Producer: Bill Szymczyk

The J. Geils Band chronology
Ladies Invited (1973)	Nightmares...and Other Tales from the Vinyl Jungle (1974)	Hotline (1975)

Professional ratings
Review scores
Source	Rating
AllMusic	4/5 stars
Christgau's Record Guide	C+
Rolling Stone	(favorable)

Nightmares...and Other Tales from the Vinyl Jungle is the fifth studio album by American rock band The J. Geils Band. The album was released on September 25, 1974, by Atlantic Records.

== Track listing ==
All songs written by Peter Wolf and Seth Justman, except as noted.

Side one
No.	Title	Length
1.	"Detroit Breakdown"	6:02
2.	"Givin' It All Up"	3:44
3.	"Must of Got Lost"	5:06
4.	"Look Me in the Eye"	3:59
5.	"Nightmares"	1:15

Side two
No.	Title	Writer(s)	Length
6.	"Stoop Down #39"		6:53
7.	"I'll Be Coming Home"		4:40
8.	"Funky Judge"	Andre Williams, Leo Hutton	3:19
9.	"Gettin' Out"		5:49

== Personnel ==
- Peter Wolf – lead vocals
- J. Geils – guitar, mandolin
- Magic Dick – harmonicas
- Seth Justman – keyboards, backing vocals
- Danny Klein – bass
- Stephen Jo Bladd – drums, backing vocals

Additional personnel

- George Jessel – spoken word on "Funky Judge"

=== Production ===
- Producer: Bill Szymczyk
- Engineers: Allan Blazek, Kevin Herron, Bill Szymczyk
- Digital remastering: George Marino
- Special assistance: Juke Joint Jimmy
- Photography: Peter Himmelman

== Charts ==
Album

Chart (1974)	Peak position
US Billboard 200	26

Singles

Year	Single	Chart	Position
1975	"Must of Got Lost"	Billboard Pop Singles	12
