= Must of Got Lost =

Single by The J. Geils Band

from the album Nightmares...and Other Tales from the Vinyl Jungle
- B-side: "Funky Judge"
- Released: September 1974
- Recorded: Record Plant Studios and The Hit Factory, New York City
- Genre: Rock
- Length: 5:06 (album version); 2:58 (single edit)
- Label: Atlantic
- Songwriters: Peter Wolf, Seth Justman
- Producer: Bill Szymczyk

The J. Geils Band singles chronology
"Make Up Your Mind" (1973)	"Must of Got Lost" (1974)	"Love-itis" (1975)

"Must of Got Lost" is a rock song by the American rock group The J. Geils Band. Released in 1974, the single reached No. 12 the following year. AllMusic critic Joe Viglione described it as "one of the most memorable tunes by The J. Geils Band." A live version of the song, with an extended spoken-word introduction by Peter Wolf, appears on Blow Your Face Out, J. Geils Band's second live album. The live version receives considerable airplay on album-oriented rock format stations.

== Background ==
The title is grammatically incorrect and can be said to be an example of a common eggcorn. Billboard described the melody as "one long hook" and the sound of the song as "funky." Cash Box called it "a rocker with solid instrumentation and a full arrangement [that] is augmented by the backing harmonies and some good lead guitar licks." Record World said that it was the band's "most commercial AM effort in some time" with "good pacing and balance between vocal and instrumental ends." Ultimate Classic Rock critic Michael Gallucci rated it to be the band's 2nd greatest song, saying that the live version on Blow Your Face Out is the best version, in which "the energy levels are pushed to a whole other level of greatness." Classic Rock History critic Brian Kachejian named "Must of Got Lost" as the band's 6th best song, particularly praising the "great hook in the chorus."

== Chart performance ==
=== Weekly charts ===
Chart (1974–75)	Peak position
Australia KMR	72
Canada RPM	27
US Billboard Hot 100	12
US Cash Box Top 100	17

=== Year-end charts ===
Chart (1975)	Rank
Canada	197
US (Joel Whitburn's Pop Annual)	124

== Popular culture ==
- This song is featured in the 2004 Disney movie Miracle and in the end-credits of the series finale of Eastbound & Down.
