= Big Walter Price =

American singer-songwriter

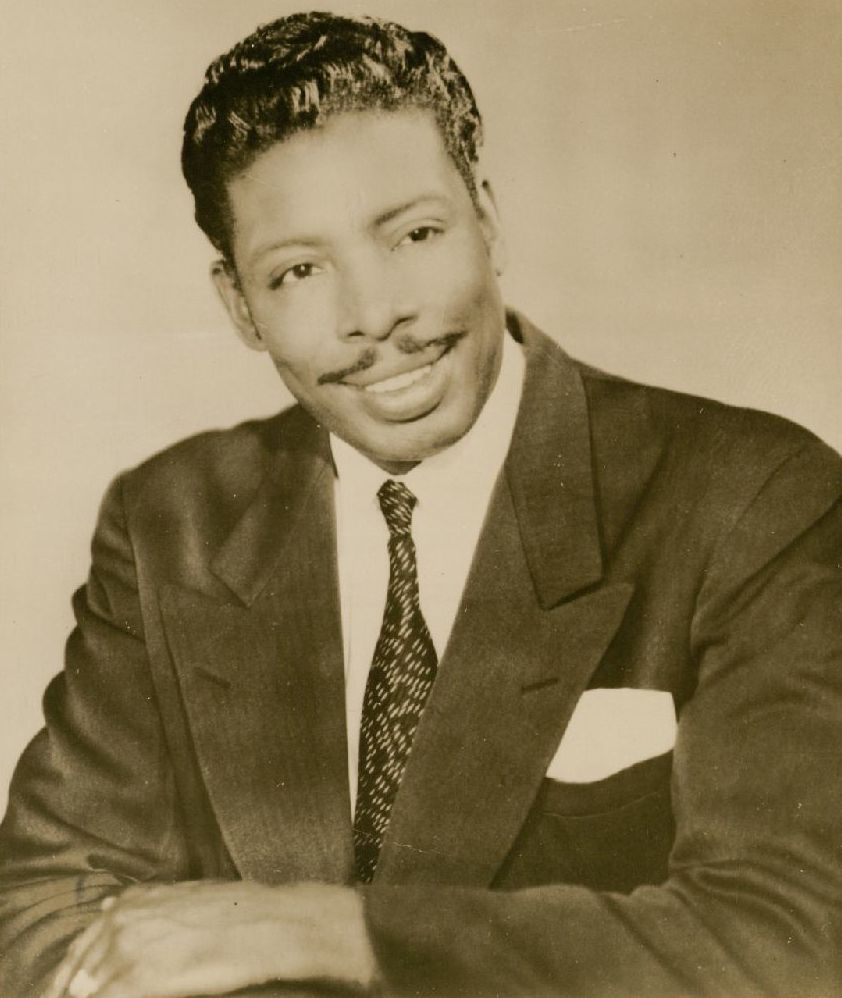

Background information
- Also known as: Thunderbird
- Born: Walter Travis Price; August 2, 1917; Near Gonzales, Texas, United States
- Died: March 7, 2012 (aged 94) Houston, Texas, United States
- Genres: Texas blues
- Occupations: Musician, songwriter
- Instruments: Piano, vocals
- Label: Peacock Records

Big Walter Price (August 2, 1917 − March 7, 2012) was an American blues singer, songwriter and pianist.

Born near Gonzales, Texas, he moved to San Antonio in 1928, where he released his first song, "Calling Margie", in 1955. In that year, he moved to Houston, where he lived until his death. In the 1960s he signed with Peacock Records and released several singles. One of these was "Shirley Jean", which one commentator noted about Price was "on which his reputation rests". His song "Pack Fair and Square" was covered by the J. Geils Band on the J. Geils Band album.

He died in 2012 aged 94 (though he claimed to be 97).
