= Friends and Legends =

Studio album by Michael Stanley
- Released: November 1973
- Recorded: 1973
- Studio: Applewood Studios, Golden, Colorado
- Genre: Rock
- Label: MCA
- Producer: Bill Szymczyk

Michael Stanley chronology
Michael Stanley (1972)	Friends and Legends (1973)	You Break It, You Bought it (1975)

Professional ratings
Review scores
Source	Rating
Allmusic	3/5 stars

Friends and Legends is the second solo album by American singer-songwriter Michael Stanley. The album title refers to the backing musicians accompanying Stanley on the album, which was recorded at Applewood Studios in Golden, Colorado. The basic band on all tracks was Barnstorm, composed of Joe Walsh on lead guitar and synthesizer, Joe Vitale on drums, flute, synthesizer and backing vocals, and Kenny Passarelli on bass. In addition, three members of Stephen Stills' Manassas performed: Paul Harris on keyboards, Joe Lala on percussion and Al Perkins on pedal steel guitar, and the band also included saxophonist David Sanborn. Among the backing vocalists were Richie Furay and Dan Fogelberg. In keeping with the collaborative spirit, J. Geils assisted with production of the saxophone tracks.

Although the album produced one of Stanley's most popular songs, "Let's Get the Show on the Road", and led to a headline spot for Stanley (backed by Barnstorm) on Don Kirshner's Rock Concert, it made little impact on the charts, partially because Stanley's all-star band was unable to tour behind it. After this, Stanley decided to form his own band, which was named The Michael Stanley Band, so that touring would no longer be a problem.

== Track listing ==
All tracks composed by Michael Stanley; except where indicated

1. "Among My Friends Again"
2. "Help!" (John Lennon, Paul McCartney)
3. "Yours for a Song"
4. "Let's Get the Show on the Road"
5. "Just Keep Playing Your Radio"
6. "Roll On"
7. "Bad Habits"
8. "Funky Is the Drummer" (Stanley, Joe Walsh, Paul Harris, Joe Vitale, Kenny Passarelli, P. Bigby, B. Lawson)
9. "Poets' Day"

== Personnel ==
- Michael Stanley - lead vocals, guitars
- Joe Walsh - lead guitars, synthesizer
- Joe Vitale - drums, flute, synthesizer, backing vocals
- Kenny Passarelli - bass
- Paul Harris - piano, organ, clavinette
- Al Perkins - pedal steel guitar
- Joe Lala - congas, timbales, percussion
- Jon Bendis - acoustic guitar
- David Sanborn - alto saxophone
- Bill Szymczyk - percussion
- Tasha Thomas - backing vocals
- Lani Groves - backing vocals
- Carla Hall - backing vocals
- Richie Furay - backing vocals
- Dan Fogelberg - backing vocals
