= Looking for Love =

Looking for Love or Lookin' for Love may refer to:

== Music ==
- Looking for Love (album), a 1964 album by Connie Francis
- "Looking for Love" (Connie Francis song), 1964
- "Looking for Love" (Karen Carpenter song), 1966
- "Lookin' for Love" (Diesel song), 1989
- "Lookin' for Love", a 1980 song by Johnny Lee
- "I Didn't Know I Was Looking for Love", a 1993 song by Everything But the Girl, later covered by Karen Ramirez
- "Looking for Love" (September song), 2007
- "Looking for Love", a song by the Cars from Heartbeat City
- "Looking for Love", a song by R. Kelly from R.
- "Looking for Love", a song by Ratt from Dancing Undercover
- "Looking for Love", a song by Whitesnake from the European release of Whitesnake

== Other uses ==
- Looking for Love (film), a 1964 musical film starring Connie Francis

== See also ==
- "Lookin' for a Love", a song written by J.W. Alexander and Zelda Samuels, covered by Bobby Womack in 1974
- "Lookin' for a Love", a 1975 song by Neil Young from Zuma
- "Looking for a New Love", a 1987 song by Jody Watley
