= This Time We Mean It =

Studio album by REO Speedwagon
- Released: July 1975
- Recorded: 1975
- Studios: Criteria Studios, Miami
- Genres: Hard rock, blues rock
- Length: 39:49
- Label: Epic
- Producers: Allan Blazek, Bill Szymczyk

REO Speedwagon chronology
Lost in a Dream (1974)	This Time We Mean It (1975)	R.E.O. (1976)

Singles from This Time We Mean It
- 1. "Reelin'" Released: 1975

Professional ratings
Review scores
Source	Rating
Allmusic	2/5 stars
Rolling Stone	(unfavorable) link

This Time We Mean It is the fifth studio album by REO Speedwagon, released in 1975. It peaked at number 74 on the Billboard 200 chart in 1975, It was the third and last album to feature Mike Murphy on vocals and features the single "Reelin'" written by Murphy.

== Track listing ==
Side one
No.	Title	Writer(s)	Length
1.	"Reelin'"	Mike Murphy	4:24
2.	"Headed for a Fall"	Richrath	3:06
3.	"River of Life"	Murphy	4:25
4.	"Out of Control"	Glenn Frey, Don Henley, Tom Nixon	2:52
5.	"You Better Realize"	Murphy	3:48

Side two
No.	Title	Writer(s)	Length
6.	"Gambler"	Richrath	3:40
7.	"Candalera"	Richrath	3:05
8.	"Lies"	Murphy	4:35
9.	"Dance"	Richrath	4:12
10.	"Dream Weaver"	Richrath	5:12

== Personnel ==
REO Speedwagon

- Mike Murphy – lead vocals
- Gary Richrath – guitar, lead vocals on "Dance"
- Neal Doughty – keyboards
- Gregg Philbin – bass, backing vocals
- Alan Gratzer – drums, backing vocals

== Charts ==
Chart (1975)	Peak position
US Billboard 200	74

== Release history ==
Region	Date	Title	Label	Format	Catalog #
USA	July 1975	This Time We Mean It	Epic Records	Stereo Vinyl	E-33338
USA	1975	This Time We Mean It	Epic Records	Tape	PET-33338
USA	1975	This Time We Mean It	Epic Records	8 TRK	E33338
USA	1975	This Time We Mean It	Epic Records	Quadraphonic Vinyl	PEQ 33338
USA	1990	This Time We Mean It	Epic Records	CD	EK33338
UK	2010	This Time We Mean It / R.E.O.	BGO Records	CD (Digitally re-mastered)	BGOCD961
Japan	2011	This Time We Mean It	Sony Music	CD (DSD-Remaster)	EICP 1484
