= Love Stinks (song) =

Single by The J. Geils Band

from the album Love Stinks
- B-side: "Till the Walls Come Tumblin' Down"
- Released: April 1980
- Recorded: 1979
- Studio: Long View Farm, North Brookfield, Massachusetts
- Genre: Rock, Hard rock, Glam metal, New wave
- Length: 3:44
- Label: EMI Records
- Songwriters: Peter Wolf, Seth Justman
- Producer: Seth Justman

The J. Geils Band singles chronology
"Come Back" (1980)	"Love Stinks" (1980)	"Just Can't Wait" (1980)

Music video
- "Love Stinks" on YouTube

"Love Stinks" is a song written by Peter Wolf and Seth Justman that was the title track of the J. Geils Band's 1980 album Love Stinks. The song was released as a single and peaked in the U.S. at #38, spending three weeks in the Top 40. In Canada, the song reached number 15, as it did on WLS-AM in Chicago.

== Background ==
The lyrics describe a love triangle in which two participants experience unrequited love, before segueing into a description of love gone sour in general. The lyrics may have been inspired by J. Geils Band lead singer Peter Wolf's marriage to actress Faye Dunaway, which ended in a 1979 divorce. Author Maury Dean describes the opening of the song as "ponderous Power Metal." Dean describes the band's playing in the refrain as generating "wild waves of flame," the guitars as "fire-breathing" and Wolf's vocals in the "yeah yeah" portion of the chorus as snarling with "heavy metal glee." Justman provides extensive keyboards, which Associated Press critic James Simon feels gives the song "a little extra zing." AllMusic describes the riff as "Lou Reed's "Vicious" as performed by his Rock & Roll Animal band on Lou Reed Live at half-speed," also noting that it is a hard rock version of the riff from "Louie Louie." Rolling Stone critic Rob Sheffield notes that the riff was later used by Nirvana in the song "Smells Like Teen Spirit."

== Reception ==
AllMusic finds such a "simple riff rocker" a departure for the J. Geils Band who were then known for blues and R&B, but admits the results are fun to listen to and acknowledges that it and other songs from the Love Stinks album pointed the way toward their pop-oriented 1981 platinum hit album Freeze Frame. AllMusic critic John Franck describes the song as "infectious", noting that it was "one of the band's most recognizable FM songs ever." Music critic Robert Christgau describes the song as "broad" and "uproarious". Rolling Stone critic Dave Marsh considers it one of the J. Geils Band's greatest songs, considering its lyrics to be "a hilarious spoof on new-wave nihilism as well as soul cliche." Rolling Stone critic Rob Sheffield calls it "one of the great trash-rock singles of the '80's." Cash Box said that the "playfully virulent lyric...mixed with Seth Justman’s whirling keyboards, creates an exciting march-like rhythm." Ultimate Classic Rock critic Michael Gallucci rated it to be the band's 3rd greatest song, saying that it incorporates "'60s garage-rock guitar," "late-'70s New Wave synths," and "a singalong chorus straight outta the era's arena rock" that "meet for a glorious collision that results in one of the group's heaviest, and best-loved, songs." The song is mentioned in an episode of Full House where Jesse (John Stamos) and his best friend Pete (Scott Baio) reminisce about once taking over a cantina in Mexico and performing a mariachi version of the song.

== "Till the Walls Come Tumblin' Down" ==
The B-side of "Love Stinks" was "Till the Walls Come Tumblin' Down", also a track from Love Stinks. Rolling Stone critic Rob Sheffield praised the song, describing it as "rollicking".

== Cover versions ==
- Joan Jett covered the song for the soundtrack of the 1996 movie Mr. Wrong.
- The song was also featured in the film Opie Gets Laid.
- It was also covered by Adam Sandler in the movie The Wedding Singer and by Himalayaz with Ms. Toi for the movie Love Stinks.
