= All American Boy (Rick Derringer album) =

Studio album by Rick Derringer
- Released: October 1973
- Recorded: 1973
- Studios: Caribou Ranch, Nederland, Colorado
- Genres: Rock, hard rock, blues rock
- Length: 40:09
- Label: Blue Sky
- Producers: Bill Szymczyk, Rick Derringer

Rick Derringer chronology
All American Boy (1973)	Spring Fever (1975)

Audio
- "Rock and Roll, Hoochie Koo" on YouTube

Professional ratings
Review scores
Source	Rating
AllMusic	4.5/5 stars
Džuboks	(favorable)
Tom Hull	B
The Rolling Stone Album Guide	2.5/5 stars

All American Boy is the debut solo studio album by American rock musician Rick Derringer, released in October 1973 by Blue Sky Records. "Joy Ride" and "Time Warp" are instrumentals.

== Critical reception ==
Reviewing for AllMusic, critic Cub Koda wrote of the album "this is simply Rick Derringer's most focused and cohesive album, a marvelous blend of rockers, ballads, and atmospheric instrumentals", adding it was "one of the great albums of the '70s that fell between the cracks."

== Release history ==
In addition to the conventional two channel stereo version the album was also released in a four channel quadraphonic edition on LP record and 8-track tape in 1974. The quad LP release was encoded in the SQ matrix system.

The album was reissued in the UK on the Super Audio CD format in 2018 by Dutton Vocalion. This release is a two albums on one disc compilation which also contains Derringer's 1975 album Spring Fever. The Dutton Vocalion disc contains the complete stereo and quad versions of both albums.

The album itself would not have nearly the same level of success as its song Rock and Roll Hoochie Koo did when it was released as a single.

== Track listing ==
All tracks composed by Rick Derringer; except where indicated

Side one

1. "Rock and Roll, Hoochie Koo" – 3:43
2. "Joy Ride" – instrumental – 1:50
3. "Teenage Queen" – 3:31
4. "Cheap Tequila" – 2:44
5. "Uncomplicated" – 3:40
6. "Hold" (Derringer, Patti Smith) – 3:12

Side two

7. "The Airport Giveth (The Airport Taketh Away)" – 2:49
8. "Teenage Love Affair" – 3:20
9. "It's Raining" – 2:05
10. "Time Warp" – instrumental – 2:53
11. "Slide On Over Slinky" – 4:21
12. "Jump, Jump, Jump" – 6:00

== Personnel ==
"Rock and Roll Hoochie-Koo"

- Rick Derringer – guitar, bass, tambourine, lead vocals
- Bobby Caldwell – drums
- Carl Hall – backing vocals
- Lani Groves – backing vocals
- Tasha Thomas – backing vocals

"Joy Ride"

- Rick Derringer – guitar, bass
- Bobby Caldwell – drums
- Joe Lala – congas, cowbell

"Teenage Queen"

- Rick Derringer – electric guitar, 12-string acoustic guitar, lead vocals
- Joe Walsh – electric guitar
- Paul Harris – piano
- Kenny Passarelli – bass
- Joe Vitale – drums

"Cheap Tequila"

- Rick Derringer – acoustic guitar, pedal steel guitar, bass, tambourine, lead vocals
- David Bromberg – dobro
- Paul Harris – piano
- Bobby Caldwell – drums
- Carl Hall – backing vocals
- Lani Groves – backing vocals
- Tasha Thomas – backing vocals

"Uncomplicated"

- Rick Derringer – lead guitar, lead vocals
- Joe Walsh – electric guitar
- Kenny Passarelli – bass
- Joe Vitale – drums
- Joe Lala – cowbell

"Hold"

- Rick Derringer – acoustic guitar, bass, lead vocals
- Edgar Winter – piano
- Bobby Caldwell – drums
- Carl Hall – backing vocals
- Lani Groves – backing vocals
- Tasha Thomas – backing vocals

"The Airport Giveth (The Airport Taketh Away)"

- Rick Derringer – guitar, bass, organ, tambourine, lead vocals
- Edgar Winter – piano
- Bobby Caldwell – drums
- Carl Hall – backing vocals
- Lani Groves – backing vocals
- Tasha Thomas – backing vocals

"Teenage Love Affair"

- Rick Derringer – guitar, bass, lead vocals, backing vocals
- Bobby Caldwell – drums

"It's Raining"

- Rick Derringer – guitar, bass, lead vocals
- Jean "Toots" Thielemans – chromatic harmonica
- Paul Harris – piano
- Bobby Caldwell – drums
- Joe Lala – congas

"Time Warp"

- Rick Derringer – acoustic guitar, electric guitar, electric sitar, bass, tambourine, maracas
- Edgar Winter – organ
- Bobby Caldwell – drums
- Joe Lala – congas

"Slide on Over Slinky"

- Rick Derringer – guitar, bass, hair-drum, cowbell, lead vocals
- Edgar Winter – synthesized clavinet
- Bobby Caldwell – drums
- Carl Hall – backing vocals
- Lani Groves – backing vocals
- Tasha Thomas – backing vocals

"Jump, Jump, Jump"

- Rick Derringer – guitar, bass, gong, lead vocals
- Edgar Winter – electric piano, acoustic piano
- Bobby Caldwell – drums

== Charts ==
Chart (1974)	Peak position
Australian (Kent Music Report)	38
