= Deanna Bogart =

American musician (born 1959)

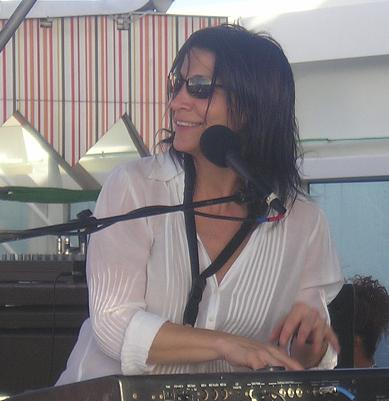
Photo of Deanna Bogart

Deanna Bogart (born September 5, 1959, Detroit, Michigan, United States), is an American blues and fusion singer, pianist, saxophone player, composer, arranger, and producer.

== Background ==
She began her career in Baltimore and the Washington suburbs of Maryland with the ensemble Cowboy Jazz, and following that band's breakup in 1986, a stint playing with Root Boy Slim. In the early 1990s she began her solo career. She has won five Blues Music Awards in the 'Instrumentalist - Horn' category, the most recent in 2023. In 2013, Bogart was nominated for a Blues Music Award in the 'Pinetop Perkins Piano Player' category.

== Discography ==
- 1991: Out to Get You
- 1992: Crossing Borders
- 1996: New Address
- 1998: The Great Unknown
- 2001: Deanna Bogart Band Live
- 2002: Timing Is Everything
- 2006: Real Time
- 2009: Eleventh Hour
- 2012: Pianoland
- 2014: Just a Wish Away
