= The Marvelows =

The Marvelows were an American soul group from Chicago, formed in 1959. After contacting arranger / producer Johnny Pate, the group signed to the ABC-Paramount label, and recorded four sides: "A Friend", "My Heart", "Hey Hey Baby", and "I Do". Originally composed as a show warmup song, "I Do" was released as a single in the summer of 1965, and peaked at number 7 on the R&B Singles chart and at number 37 on Billboard's Hot 100. It was later covered twice by The J. Geils Band, first in 1977, and again on a live album in 1982, charting at number 24 on the Hot 100.

The group changed its name to The Mighty Marvelows in order to avoid being confused with The Marvellos (Loma Records), after the Marvellos filed suit in 1964, and hit the charts only once more, with 1968's "In the Morning" (U.S. R&B number 24). An LP followed, entitled The Mighty Marvelows, but the group broke up in 1969, reuniting only once, briefly, in 1974.

== Members ==
- Melvin Mason - singer
- Frank Paden - singer (bass)
- Johnny Paden - lead singer (tenor)
- Willie (Sonny) Stephenson - singer (tenor)
- Jesse Smith - singer
- Andrew Thomas (replaced Smith in 1966)
- James Ray - singer
- Clark Turner - singer
- Alvin Luckett - singer
