= Lookin' for a Love =

1962 single by The Valentinos

Single by the Valentinos
- B-side: "Somewhere There's a Girl"
- Released: March 1962
- Recorded: 1962
- Genre: Doo-wop, R&B, soul
- Length: 3:15
- Label: SAR
- Songwriters: J. W. Alexander, Zelda Samuels
- Producer: Sam Cooke

"Looking for a Love"

Single by the J. Geils Band

from the album The Morning After
- B-side: "Whammer Jammer" (US) "What's Your Hurry" (Intl.)
- Released: November 1971
- Recorded: Record Plant West, Los Angeles
- Genre: Blues rock, rock and roll
- Length: 3:47
- Label: Atlantic Records
- Songwriters: J.W. Alexander, Zelda Samuels
- Producer: Bill Szymczyk

The J. Geils Band singles chronology
"Wait" (1971)	"Looking for a Love" (1971)	"I Don't Need You No More" (1972)

"Lookin' for a Love"

Single by Bobby Womack

from the album Lookin' for a Love Again
- B-side: "Let It Hang Out"
- Released: January 1974
- Recorded: 1973
- Genre: R&B, soul, funk
- Length: 2:37
- Label: United Artists
- Songwriters: J. W. Alexander, Zelda Samuels
- Producer: Bobby Womack

Bobby Womack singles chronology
"I'm Through Trying to Prove My Love to You" (1973)	"Lookin' for a Love" (1974)	"You're Welcome, Stop On By" (1974)

"Lookin' for a Love" is a song written by J. W. Alexander and Zelda Samuels and was the debut hit of the family group the Valentinos, which featured Bobby Womack. The song was a hit for the Valentinos, climbing to number eight on the R&B chart and crossing over to number 72 on the Billboard Hot 100 in 1962, released on Sam Cooke's SAR label. The song became a much bigger hit when Womack issued a solo version in 1974; this version reached number one on the R&B chart and number ten on the Billboard Hot 100. As well, an interim version of "Lookin' for a Love" by the J. Geils Band in 1971 was a top-40 hit for them, peaking at number 39.

== Background ==
The melody originally came from a gospel hymn titled, "Couldn't Hear Nobody Pray," recorded and released in 1961 when they were still known as the Womack Brothers. Sam Cooke produced that session as well as the sessions for "Lookin' For a Love". Following the release of "Couldn't Hear Nobody Pray" and convinced that 17-year-old Bobby Womack would "go places", Cooke hired his staff writers J. W. Alexander and Zelda Samuels to rewrite the song as a doo-wop dance number, basing the song's chord structure on the melodic motif found in "Pray".

When the brothers were presented with the song, they protested initially fearing a backlash from their minister father, Friendly Womack. However, Cooke convinced them that the song would be a hit and guarantee the Womacks some financial success as well as commercial. Like "Couldn't Hear Nobody Pray", the song featured Bobby on lead. Prior to its release, Cooke suggested a name change, thinking the change would do wonders for their career as it had done for him. Cooke settled on the Valentinos and released the song that spring.

== Chart performance ==
After its success, the group opened for James Brown & The Famous Flames where they won fans. In 1973, Bobby used "Lookin' for a Love" as a warm-up song to help loosen up his vocal cords during a recording session. Womack recorded one take of the song - with his brothers again providing background vocals - but had no plans of putting it out as a single. However, after some convincing, he released the song in early 1974 and the song went on to be his most successful single to date, and was his second number-one single on the Hot Soul Singles chart (after "Woman's Gotta Have It" in 1972, which only got to number 60 on the Hot 100) and his first and only top-10 hit on the Billboard Hot 100, where it peaked at number 10. It also reached number eight on the Cash Box Top 100. The single was later certified gold by the RIAA for sales of one million copies. This resulted in the song later selling more than two million copies. The song's success was bittersweet, however: the song's background vocalist Harry Womack later died from stab wounds from his girlfriend the week before it hit number one.

== Charts ==
Valentinos original

Chart (1962)	Peak position
US Billboard Hot 100	72
US Billboard R&B	8
US Cash Box Top 100	63

== Credits (Bobby Womack versions) ==
=== 1962 original ===
- Lead vocal by Bobby Womack
- Background vocals by the Valentinos: Friendly Womack, Jr., Curtis Womack, Harry Womack and Cecil Womack
- Instrumentation by SAR Records staff musicians
- Produced by Sam Cooke

=== 1974 version ===
- Lead vocal by Bobby Womack
- Background vocals by the Valentinos: Friendly Womack, Jr., Curtis Womack, Harry Womack and Cecil Womack
- Instrumentation by the Muscle Shoals Rhythm Section
- Produced by Bobby Womack

== Charts ==
Bobby Womack version

=== Weekly charts ===
Chart (1974)	Peak position
Canada RPM Top Singles	24
US Billboard Hot 100	10
US Billboard R&B	1
US Cash Box Top 100	8

=== Year-end charts ===
Chart (1974)	Rank
Canada	197
US Billboard Hot 100	67
US Cash Box	75

J. Geils Band cover

Chart (1971–72)	Peak position
Canada RPM Top Singles	25
US Billboard Hot 100	39
US Cash Box Top 100	37

== Cover Versions ==
- In 1971, rock band the J. Geils Band covered the song as one of its first releases and the song became a top-40 hit for them, peaking at number 39. Record World called it a "hard driving rocker" and a "high energy package." Classic Rock History critic Brian Kachejian named "Lookin' for a Love" as the band's 2nd best song.
- Squeeze covered the song for their album East Side Story, which features Paul Carrack on co-lead vocals. The track is only available as a bonus track.
- Tortoise Matsumoto as singer of Ulfuls had covered the song his first solo album Traveller in 2003.

== See also ==
- Looking for Love (disambiguation)
