= Bill Szymczyk =

American record producer (born 1943)

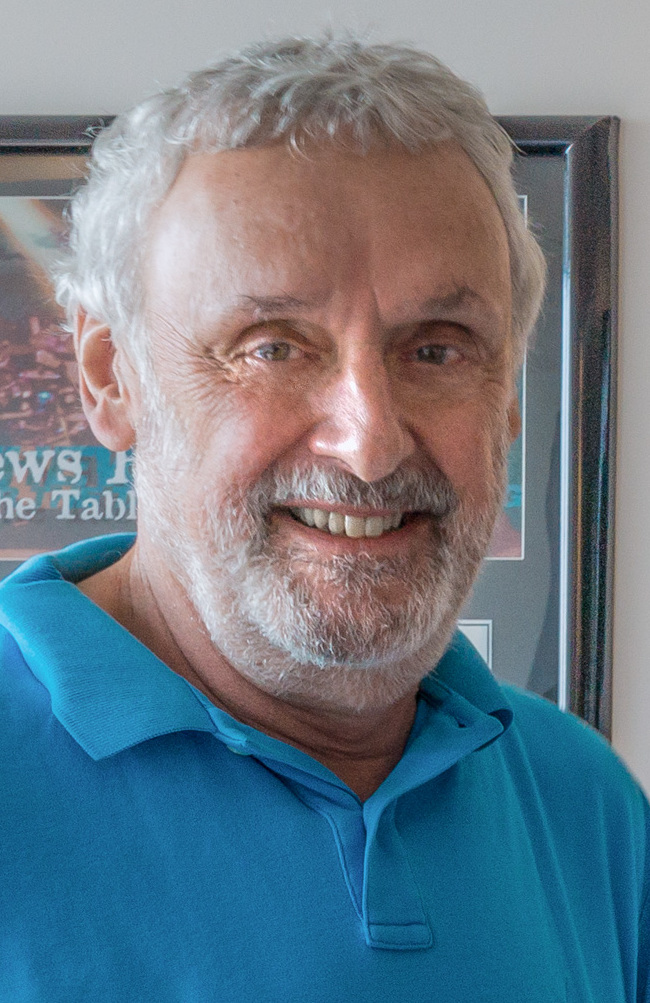
- Szymczyk in 2014

Background information
- Born: William Frank Szymczyk; February 13, 1943 (age 83); Muskegon, Michigan, U.S.
- Genre: Rock
- Occupations: Producer; engineer
- Years active: 1967–present
- Labels: ABC; Tumbleweed

William Frank Szymczyk (/ˈsɪmzɪk/; born February 13, 1943) is an American music producer and recording engineer best known for working with rock and blues musicians, most notably the Eagles in the 1970s. He produced many top albums and singles of the 1970s, though—aside from continuing to work with Joe Walsh—he retired from the music business in 1990. He re-emerged in the late 2000s, taking on select projects including the 2007 Eagles album Long Road Out of Eden and the 2008 eponymous debut of Brian Vander Ark.

Unlike many music producers, Szymczyk has no background as a musician. He was originally a sonar operator for the U.S. Navy and took some audio production classes as part of his Navy training. Besides his work with the Eagles, he has produced hit songs and albums for such diverse artists as B.B. King, the Who, Joe Walsh, the James Gang, and Elvin Bishop.

== Early life ==
Bill Szymczyk was born in Muskegon, Michigan on February 13, 1943 into a working-class family of Polish roots. His mother worked as a nurse, and his father held several jobs, including factory worker and maintenance at a school. Growing up, his first introduction to music and electronics was when he built his own crystal radio from a kit. Using his radio, he became a fan of blues and R&B while listening to a station out of Nashville, Tennessee.

He joined the United States Navy in 1960, where he worked as a sonar technician. While in the Navy he took his first course in radio and television production. Upon leaving in 1964, and without much of an idea of what to do for a post-military career, he enrolled at New York University's Media Arts School.

== Professional career ==
Szymczyk began working at a firm which produced demo recordings for Screen Gems Records and worked extensively with Brill Building songwriters such as Carole King and Gerry Goffin. He also worked as an assistant to music producers and songwriters Quincy Jones and Jerry Ragovoy, eventually working his way up to chief engineer at Ragavoy's Hit Factory recording studio in New York City. His first work as the primary producer on an album came for a Harvey Brooks solo record. He dropped out of NYU to work full-time in the music industry.

He left the Hit Factory and took a job at ABC Records, taking a large pay cut in exchange for the opportunity to move from engineer to producer. He successfully lobbied ABC to let him work with B. B. King, whose own record label was a subsidiary of ABC and who was a long time idol of Szymczyk's. After Szymczyk convinced King that he could improve his sound to make him more appealing to a wider audience, King himself agreed to let Szymczyk produce for him. Among the albums he produced for King are the 1969 live album Live & Well, King's first ever top-100 album. He produced his follow-up studio album Completely Well, which featured "The Thrill Is Gone", the biggest hit of King's career and his signature song. He would continue to produce blues albums throughout the early 1970s for the likes of King and Albert Collins.

Szymczyk was moved several times while working for ABC Records; first to Los Angeles when ABC acquired Dunhill Records and Szymczyk took over production for the West Coast operations, and later to Denver when he decided to form his own label, Tumbleweed Records. He worked for a while as a disc jockey at radio station KFML, and continued to produce albums in New York and Los Angeles, such as the J. Geils Band's 1971 album The Morning After, recorded at the Los Angeles Record Plant. He did extensive work at the Colorado studio Caribou Ranch.

After producing the James Gang's first three albums, he followed singer-guitarist Joe Walsh when he left the band, first as a solo artist with the Szymczyk-produced albums Barnstorm (the first recorded at the Caribou Ranch studio) and The Smoker You Drink, the Player You Get and later with the Eagles. His most prolific collaborations have been with Walsh; the two have made over 15 albums together in many settings. Walsh himself moved to Boulder, Colorado in 1971 in order to work with Szymczyk and the location would inspire one of Walsh's biggest solo hits, 1973's "Rocky Mountain Way". Besides work with Walsh in his band The James Gang and as a solo artist, he also brought Walsh in to work on several albums he was doing with other musicians, using him as a session player for the B. B. King album Indianola Mississippi Seeds and the Michael Stanley albums Michael Stanley and Friends and Legends. It was at Szymczyk's suggestion that the Eagles bring in Walsh to give them a "rock" edge; Walsh has remained a core member of the band to this day.

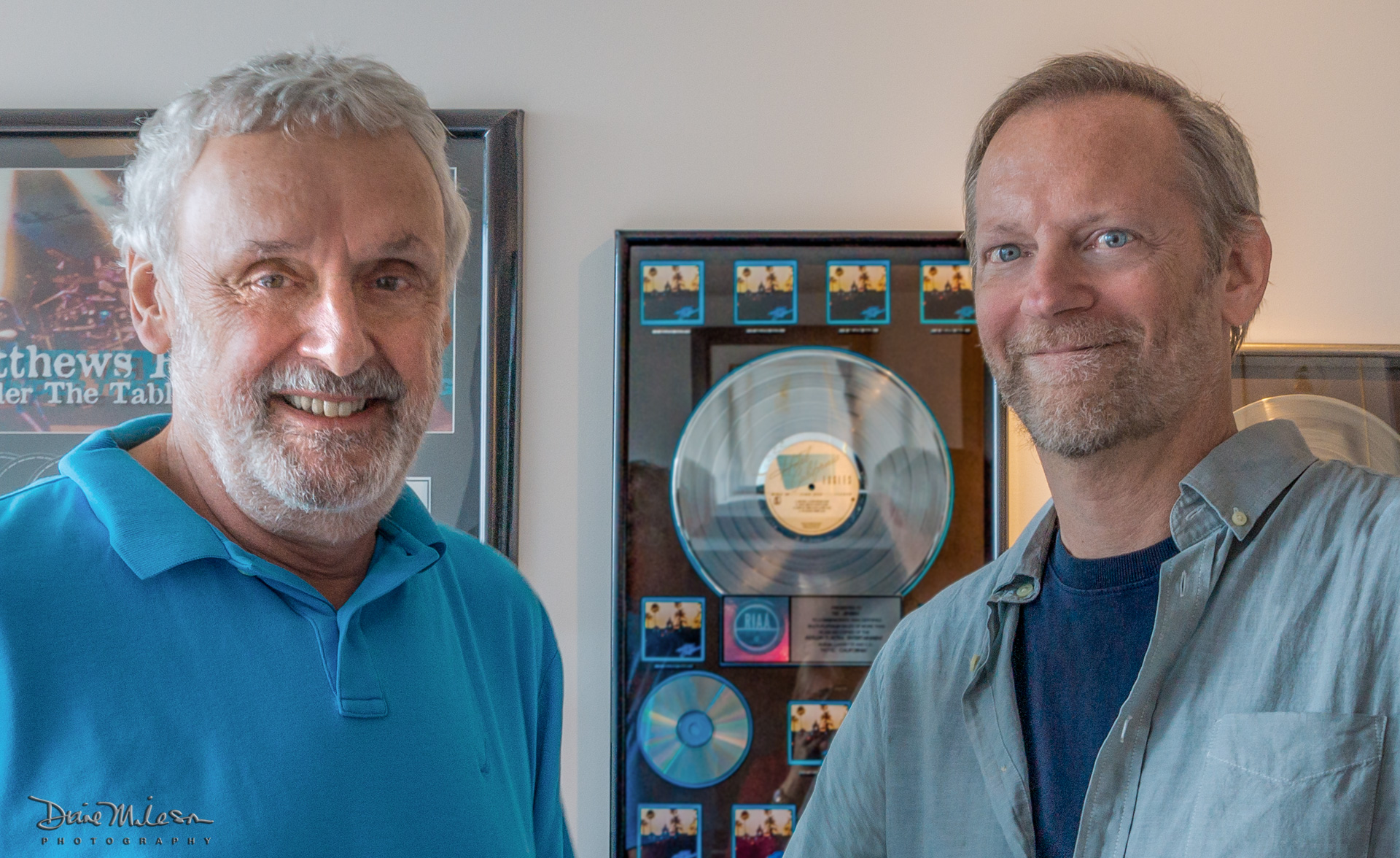
Bill Szymczyk (left) and Ted Jensen at Sterling Sound 2014

His long relationship with the Eagles began with their 1974 album On the Border, an album he took over from London-based producer Glyn Johns. He would be the sole producer for the next three Eagles studio albums, including 1976's Hotel California, the first to feature Joe Walsh. Szymczyk was instrumental in giving the Eagles a more "rock sound" and helping them to move away from their country rock roots.Just prior to Hotel California Szymczyk had recorded ‘There’s the Rub’ with English Rock band Wishbone Ash, in the same studio, whose harmonic twin guitar style was said to have influenced Hotel California. Wishbone Ash had even stayed in the same villa before the Eagles moved there. >ref name = AMG/>

Among the other acts he worked with extensively through the 1970s include Michael Stanley and the J. Geils Band. While working with the Outlaws, he coined the term "Guitar Army" to describe the band's sound; the name continues as a nickname for the band. He worked in the studio for the Edgar Winter Group's biggest hit, the Rick Derringer-produced "Frankenstein", and later produced Derringer's best known solo album All American Boy and its hit single, "Rock and Roll, Hoochie Koo". At the start of the 1980s he was a highly sought-after producer, and worked on such albums as Bob Seger's 1980 album Against the Wind and the Who's 1981 release Face Dances. During this time period, Szymczyk produced such hit singles as Elvin Bishop's "Fooled Around and Fell in Love", the Who's "You Better You Bet", the Eagles' "Hotel California", and Bob Seger's "Against the Wind".

His workload tailed off in the mid-1980s, due mostly to his own financial success. Aside from continuing to work with Joe Walsh, he retired from the music industry in 1990, and then re-emerged in 2005, producing Dishwalla's self-titled fourth album. He returned to work with the Eagles on the 2007 album Long Road Out of Eden, and followed that with the 2008 solo debut of ex-Verve Pipe singer Brian Vander Ark.

He now lives in Little Switzerland, North Carolina with his wife Lisi. The couple have two children, Michael and Dani, and have become involved in their local community, having raised money for a local shelter for victims of domestic violence, among other charity work. He still works as a producer, but is more selective about projects he works on.

== Production style ==
Szymczyk's has frequently been noted as the sort of producer who pushes bands to expand their musical horizons; he has been brought in with the specific intent of changing a band's sound. He himself has credited this tendency to his lack of musical knowledge, stating: "I'm a professional listener. I listen and I react. I never was a musician, so I don't bring any preconceived prejudices to the table; I don't favour the guitar over the keyboard, and so forth. I just listen and try to figure out if I have anything I can bring to a song."

For his work with the Eagles, he has been cited for his innovative mixing of drums, laboriously working to get the right microphones and placements for just the right sound. Rather than recording harmony vocals individually, and mixing them together later, as was common, Szymczyk preferred to capture the Eagles singing in ensemble, often spending many hours to record each phrase "just right".

For the Elvin Bishop hit "Fooled Around and Fell in Love," it was Szymczyk who suggested the inclusion of the song on Bishop's Struttin' My Stuff album, feeling the blues-oriented album lacked a pop single. The song would go on to become Bishop's biggest hit. Such a pattern was repeated throughout his career. The Eagles brought him in to refine and improve their "rock" sound, and all of their biggest selling albums and songs were Szymczyk-produced. Martin Turner of Wishbone Ash has called him "my all time favourite producer". While the two did not always get along during recording, usually over Turner's bass-playing style, Turner does credit Szymczyk with giving the band a more commercial sound on one of their most successful albums, 1974's There's the Rub.

== Selected discography ==
All credits as producer unless otherwise noted.

=== B. B. King ===
- Live & Well (1969)
- Completely Well (1969)
- Indianola Mississippi Seeds (1970)
- Live in Cook County Jail (1971)

=== Silk/Michael Stanley/Michael Stanley Band ===
- Smooth as Raw Silk (1969)
- Michael Stanley (1972)
- Friends and Legends (1973)
- You Break It... You Bought It (1975)
- Ladies Choice (1976)
- Stagepass (1977)

=== The James Gang ===
- Yer' Album (1969)
- James Gang Rides Again (1970)
- Thirds (1971)
- James Gang Live in Concert (1971)

=== Joe Walsh ===
- Barnstorm (1972)
- The Smoker You Drink, the Player You Get (1973)
- So What (1974)
- But Seriously, Folks... (1978)
- You Bought It – You Name It (1983)
- Ordinary Average Guy (as engineer) (1991)
- Songs for a Dying Planet (1992)
- A Future to This Life: Robocop – The Series Soundtrack (1995)
- Joe Walsh's Greatest Hits – Little Did He Know... (remastering) (1997)

=== Eagles ===
- On the Border (1974)
- One of These Nights (1975)
- Hotel California (1976)
- The Long Run (1979)
- Eagles Live (1980)
- Long Road Out of Eden (2007)

=== The J. Geils Band ===
- The Morning After (1971)
- Bloodshot (1973)
- Ladies Invited (1973)
- Nightmares...and Other Tales from the Vinyl Jungle (1974)
- Hotline (1975)
- Blow Your Face Out (live, 1976)

=== Jo Jo Gunne/Jay Ferguson ===
- Bite Down Hard (1973)
- Jumpin' the Gunne (1973)
- All Alone in the End Zone (1976)
- Thunder Island (1978)
- Real Life Ain't This Way (1979)

=== Others ===
- Ford Theatre - Time Changes (1969)
- Danny Holien - Danny Holien (as producer and engineer) (1971)
- Pharoah Sanders - Thembi (1971)
- Edgar Winter Group - They Only Come Out at Night (as technical director) (1972)
- Johnny Winter - Still Alive and Well (as technical director) (1973)
- Rick Derringer - All American Boy (1973)
- Wishbone Ash - There's the Rub (1974)
- Johnny Winter - Saints & Sinners (as engineer) (1974)
- Elvin Bishop - Struttin' My Stuff (1975)
- Rick Derringer - Spring Fever (1975)
- REO Speedwagon - This Time We Mean It (as executive producer) (1975)
- Elvin Bishop - Hometown Boy Makes Good! (1976)
- Outlaws - Hurry Sundown (1977)
- Outlaws - Bring It Back Alive (live, 1978)
- Bob Seger & The Silver Bullet Band - Against the Wind (1980)
- The Who - Face Dances (1981)
- Santana - Shango (1982)
- Melvin James - "The Passenger" (1987)
- Dishwalla - Dishwalla (2005)
- Brian Vander Ark - Brian Vander Ark (2008)
- Brian Vander Ark - Magazine (2011)
- Tide Brothers - “High Water Mark” (2016)
- Kona - "Mondays In April - Live at The Bootleg Theater" (as mixer) (2022)
- Meredith Parks - "Trying To Find My Way" (2025)
