= The J. Geils Band =

American rock band

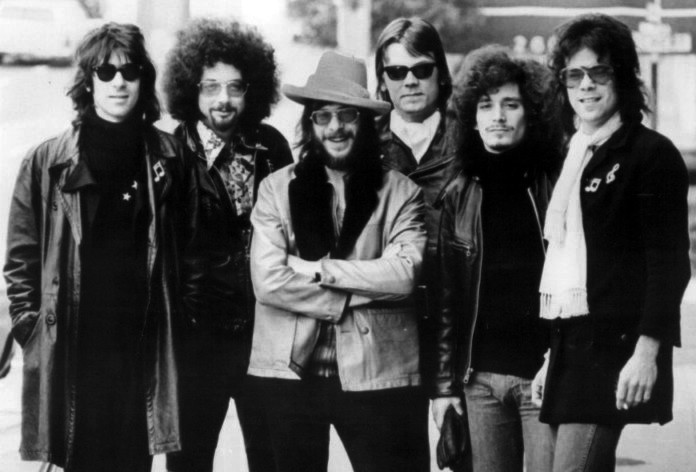
- The J Geils Band in 1973.

Background information
- Also known as: The J. Geils Blues Band
- Origin: Worcester, Massachusetts, U.S.
- Genres: Rock; blues rock (early); new wave (later)
- Years active: 1967–1985; 1999; 2005; 2006; 2009–2015
- Labels: Atlantic, EMI America
- Past members: J. Geils (aka John Geils); Stephen Jo Bladd; Magic Dick; Danny Klein; Seth Justman; Peter Wolf
- Website: jgeilsband.com

The J. Geils Band /ˈɡaɪlz/ (formerly known as The J. Geils Blues Band) was an American rock band formed in 1967, in Worcester, Massachusetts, under the leadership of guitarist John "J." Geils. The original band members included vocalist Peter Wolf, harmonica, trumpet, and saxophone player Richard "Magic Dick" Salwitz (lead blues singer before Wolf joined the band), drummer Stephen Bladd, vocalist/keyboardist Seth Justman, and bassist Danny Klein. Wolf and Justman served as principal songwriters. The band played R&B-influenced blues rock during the 1970s, and achieved commercial success before moving toward a more mainstream new wave sound in the early 1980s, which brought the band to its commercial peak.

They performed a mix of cover songs of classic blues and R&B, along with original compositions written primarily by Wolf and Justman, as well as some group compositions written under the pseudonymous name Juke Joint Jimmy. After Wolf left the band in 1983 to pursue a solo career, the band released one more album in 1984 with Justman and Bladd on lead vocals, before breaking up in 1985. Beginning in 1999, the band had several reunions until the death of its namesake, J. Geils, on April 11, 2017.

The band first released several Top 40 singles in the early 1970s, including a cover of the song "Lookin' For A Love" by The Valentinos (which reached No. 39 on the Billboard Hot 100 in 1972), as well as the single "Give It to Me" (No. 30 in 1973). Their biggest hits included "Must of Got Lost" (No. 12 in 1975), "Come Back" (No. 32 in 1980), "Love Stinks" (which reached No. 38 in 1980 and was featured in several films), "Centerfold" (No. 1 in 1982), and "Freeze-Frame" (No. 4 in 1982).

== Early days ==
The band formed in the mid-1960s while John Geils attended Worcester Polytechnic Institute for a couple of semesters after transferring from Northeastern University in Boston (where he lived in "The Playboy Room" of the Gamma Phi Kappa fraternity). Originally named Snoopy and the Sopwith Camels, the group was an acoustic blues trio with Geils on guitar, bassist Danny Klein ("Dr. Funk"), and harmonica player Richard Salwitz ("Magic Dick").

In 1968, the band switched focus, going electric and recruiting two fellow musicians from Boston band The Hallucinations, drummer Stephen Jo Bladd and vocalist Peter Blankfield, a fast-talking former WBCN disc jockey with the air name Peter Wolf. Initial influences included James Cotton and Little Walter – in a 2008 interview, harmonica star Magic Dick said they were all "harp freaks".

They became The J. Geils Blues Band, later dropping the word "Blues" from the band name. Fan Seth Justman joined on keyboards, and the band began earning a sizable following in the Boston area.

The band took its time carefully considering various contract offers. Unofficial live recordings circulated: as noted in Creem, "WBCN had the infamous J. Geils 'bathroom tapes' (that were almost exactly what the name implies) and a tape of their performance at Alternate Media Conference at Goddard College, but these hardly sufficed" to fans who wanted a proper album. The group ultimately signed to Atlantic Records in 1970.

== 1970s touring, recordings and early top 40 success ==
After spending the better part of 1970 playing live shows around the US, opening for artists as eclectic as B. B. King, Johnny Winter, The Allman Brothers, and The Byrds, The J. Geils Band recorded their debut LP The J. Geils Band in August 1970 in A&R Studios in New York City. It was released in November. The band started to get airplay with the release of their first single, a rock cover of The Contours' Motown hit, "First I Look at the Purse", and the band got more AM radio airplay with a series of successful singles in the early 1970s. The first one was a cover version of The Valentinos' "Lookin' for a Love", which appeared on their second album The Morning After and was their Top 40 debut in 1972 (at No. 39 on the Billboard chart). The album was released in October 1971. In April 1972, Atlantic staff producer Michael Cuscuna enlisted the J. Geils Band to record two tracks behind Buddy Guy, "This Old Fool" and "Honeydripper"; these songs were included on the album Buddy Guy & Junior Wells Play the Blues, issued in August 1972.

Through constant touring, the band built a large following in the US for their energetic live shows, with the charismatic stage-antics and "microphone-stand-pole-vaulting" of singer Peter Wolf, as well as its innovative use of the harmonica. Harmonicalinks.com later called Magic Dick "a pioneer in sound and style for rock harmonica." AllMusic described their 1970s period as a band "pure and simple, churning out greasy covers of obscure R&B, doo wop, and soul tunes, while cutting them with a healthy dose of Stonesy swagger." On August 17, 1971, at a show on the Boston Common, The Allman Brothers Band named The J. Geils Band as its favorite local band. Both bands later played the last show at the Fillmore East prior to the venue's closing.

The J. Geils Band's third album Full House, recorded in April 1972 at the Cinderella Ballroom in Detroit and released that September, showcased their live appeal. Although the members were born in New York City, Washington, and Connecticut, and met and formed the band in Worcester, Massachusetts, they had always considered Detroit their second home because of their enormous popularity there. Part of their second live album (Blow Your Face Out, 1976), and all of their third (Showtime!, 1982), would also be recorded in Detroit.

After the release of their first two albums and keeping a busy show schedule, it was The J. Geils Band's third studio album Bloodshot that would be the first commercial breakthrough for the band, reaching No. 10 on the Billboard 200 album charts in the United States in 1973 and spawning the single "Give It to Me", which went to No. 30 in the Billboard charts following the album's release in 1973. The original U.S. copies of Bloodshot were distributed in red vinyl instead of the customary black, with matching red 1950s-style Atlantic Records labels. The band would continue to use these vintage-style Atlantic labels, in different colors with each album release, throughout their remaining tenure with the label. Seeking to capitalize on this commercial success, the band released their next album, Ladies Invited, in November of that same year; it debuted at No. 51 but did not match the commercial success of Bloodshot. After spending the early part of 1974 on the road with an active touring schedule, the band went back into the studio and recorded their fifth studio album Nightmares...and Other Tales from the Vinyl Jungle, which yielded a big hit single, the Justman/Wolf composition "Must of Got Lost", which reached No. 12 on the Billboard Top 100 in early 1975. Later that year, the band started playing arenas across the US with a variety of artists including the Rolling Stones, Peter Frampton, and Rod Stewart. After their initial commercial success and with constant touring, the group seemed destined to be nothing more than a party band until the release of Monkey Island (1977). The group left Atlantic Records and signed to EMI America for Sanctuary (1978), which charted at No. 49 on the Billboard 200 and spun off a sizable hit single in "One Last Kiss" (No. 35 on the Billboard Hot 100).

== 1980s commercial peak and breakup ==
The group hit their commercial peak and achieved mainstream success in the early 1980s, first with the humorous Love Stinks which was released in January 1980 and yielded two Top 40 singles, the song "Come Back", which peaked at No. 32 on the Billboard chart, and the title track "Love Stinks", which went to No. 38. "Love Stinks" remained a staple in FM radio in the 1980s and was showcased in the 1998 hit film The Wedding Singer, in which Robbie Hart, depressed after being jilted at the altar by his fiance, sings it in an obnoxiously loud growl and exhorts guests at a wedding reception to join in. It also appeared on the film's soundtrack, The Wedding Singer Volume 2, also released in 1998. The band spent most of 1980 touring the US and Europe, and toured Japan for the first time.

The band followed up the success of Love Stinks with their hit album Freeze Frame, which reached No. 1 in early 1982 for four weeks. The first single "Centerfold" which hit No. 1 for six weeks on the Billboard Hot 100 "Centerfold" also became their first major hit single in the United Kingdom, where it reached No. 3 in February 1982. The title cut, "Freeze Frame", peaked at No. 4 in April 1982. The flip side of "Freeze Frame", "Flamethrower" received airplay on urban contemporary radio, notably in Metro Detroit, reached No. 25 on the Billboard Soul chart, and peaked at No. 12 on the U.S. Billboard Hot Dance Club Play chart. The song also received airplay on rock and Top 40 stations. The third and final single from the album, "Angel in Blue," peaked at No. 40 on the Billboard Hot 100. The band's videos for "Centerfold" and "Freeze Frame" were in heavy rotation on MTV, which also contributed to the album's success. In 1982, the band frequently sold out arenas across the US, including a month-long tour with U2 as their support act in March of that year. The band also undertook a two-month tour of Europe playing with the Rolling Stones from June and July of that year as well. The band followed up on the international success of Freeze Frame with the release of another live album, Showtime!, which contained their No. 24 live hit cover of "I Do", originally a 1965 hit by The Marvelows, which the J. Geils Band had previously covered on Monkey Island.

Wolf left the group in 1983 over disagreements on the group's musical direction. In 2016, Wolf offered the following recollection of the disagreements within the group that led to his departure: "I did not leave the band, but the majority of the band wanted to move in another direction.[...] They wanted to continue in a pop-techno way, [and] it wasn't my thing."

The band went on to record one more album of new material, You're Gettin' Even While I'm Gettin' Odd. Justman and Bladd took over lead vocal duties in Wolf's absence; both of them had previously sung backup and the occasional joint lead with Wolf. The album produced the single "Concealed Weapons", written by Seth and Paul Justman, which reached No. 63 on the Billboard Hot 100. The group disbanded in 1985 after contributing the title song to the horror film Fright Night.

== Reunion appearances, Geils' departure, and final dissolution ==
The group reunited with Wolf in 1999 for a 13-date tour of the East Coast and upper Midwest. Rollins Band drummer Sim Cain sat in on drums for this tour, which also featured backup singers Andricka Hall and Catherine Russell, as well as the Uptown Horns (who had also appeared with the group on its Freeze Frame Tour). After the '99 reunion tour finished at that year's end, Wolf returned to touring with his own backup band.

On February 26, 2005, the band (with drummer Marty Richards) reunited at the Charles Hotel in Cambridge, Massachusetts, for a charity show for the Cam Neely Foundation for cancer care. On May 22, 2006, all six original members had a surprise reunion at bassist Danny Klein's 60th birthday party at Scullers Jazz Club in Boston.

On February 19, 2009, the band reunited again to perform the opening concert at the new House of Blues in Boston on Lansdowne Street (formerly the location of Avalon, Axis, The Embassy and The Modern), with Marty Richards on drums and Mitch Chakour supplying backup vocals. Subsequently, they played two shows on April 24 and 25 at Detroit's Fillmore Theater (formerly State Theater). They also did a second show on Lansdowne Street on April 28.

On July 11, 2009, The J. Geils Band played at the Borgata Hotel/Casino in Atlantic City, NJ, selling out the Borgata's 2,000-seat event center. On December 31, 2009, the band reunited for a one-night live gig at the Mohegan Sun Arena in Uncasville, CT.

The band played a benefit for Big Brothers/Big Sisters in Boston on January 23, 2010. On August 14, 2010, The J. Geils Band reunited once again to open for Aerosmith at a sold-out show at Fenway Park. For their 2010 dates, the band was again supported by the Uptown Horns along with backup singers Mitch Chakour, Andricka Hall and Nichelle Tillman. Hall and Tillman toured with the band for their 2012 tour, as did the Uptown Horns, while Hall, Mitch Chakour, and Ada Dyer were the backup singers on the 2011 tour. By then, Wolf and Geils had both been touring as solo artists. Danny Klein formed a new band, Danny Klein's Full House, dedicated to playing The J. Geils Band's music.

The J. Geils Band embarked on a short U.S. tour in August/September 2012. However, they left for the tour without J. Geils, replaced by touring guitarists Duke Levine and Kevin Barry, along with touring drummer Tom Arey. A furious Geils sued the other group members for using the band's name to tour without him. He named band members Richard Salwitz, Danny Klein, Peter Wolf, and Seth Justman in the lawsuit filed in Boston Superior Court, claiming they "planned and conspired" to continue touring without him and unlawfully used the group's trademarked name. Geils' lawsuit was unsuccessful. Angry at his bandmates for what they did, he permanently left the band, although he admitted in an interview several years later that he did not bear his bandmates any ill will, saying, "I wish them well. There is no bitterness on my part..." Geils died in 2017.

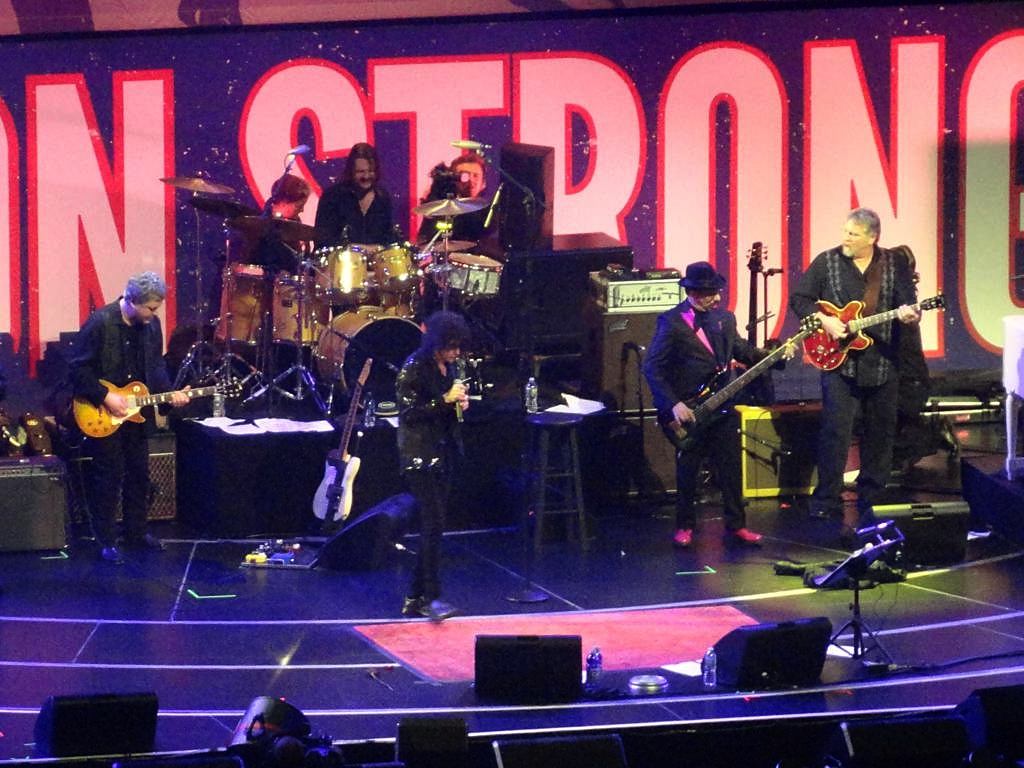
The J. Geils band performing in 2013

Despite losing their eponymous leader, the J. Geils Band remained active. On May 30, 2013, they performed six songs as part of the Boston Strong concert at the TD Garden in Boston. The concert, a benefit for victims of the recent Boston Marathon bombing victims, also featured Aerosmith, James Taylor, Boston, Dropkick Murphys, New Kids on the Block, Bell Biv DeVoe, Boyz II Men, Jimmy Buffett, Carole King, Extreme and Jason Aldean.

In 2013, the band opened for Bon Jovi at multiple locations across the United States. Beginning in the fall of 2014 and through early 2015, the J. Geils Band opened for Bob Seger and the Silver Bullet Band on most tour dates across North America, along with a few solo shows. Their final tour was in the summer of 2015, with their final show being played in Detroit, MI.

The band was nominated for induction into the Rock and Roll Hall of Fame in the years 2005, 2006, 2011, 2017, and 2018. They were not voted in on any of those attempts.

== Projects outside of the band ==
Since the breakup of the band in 1985, J. Geils began restoring sports cars in Massachusetts and started the performance shop KTR European Motorsports in Ayer, Massachusetts. In 1992, he joined his old bandmate Richard "Magic Dick" Salwitz to form the band Bluestime, which released two records: the self-titled Bluestime (1994) and Little Car Blues (1996) on Rounder Records. In 2004, Geils produced the album Nail It! for Massachusetts-based blues/rock group The Installers (Francesca Records No. 1011). He also occasionally performed live with the group. The December 2009 edition of Vintage Guitar featured an in-depth interview with Geils by Mambo Sons guitarist Tom Guerra. In the interview, Geils discussed his playing approach, jazz influences, and instrument choices. Geils released several jazz albums with Gerry Beaudoin.

Magic Dick contributed harmonica and some vocals to a live recording called Command Performance by the Legendary Rhythm & Blues Revue, featuring the Tommy Castro Band, Deanna Bogart, Ronnie Baker Brooks, and others. Since 2007, he has toured with the Legendary Rhythm & Blues Revue on various Blues Cruises and on land-based shows. Magic Dick remains active and tours as an acoustic duo with Shun Ng. The duo released an EP, "About Time".

Peter Wolf followed his time in the band with a moderately successful solo career, having six solo singles chart on the U.S. Billboard Hot 100 in the 1980s and early 1990s. He continued to release albums into the 2010s, with his most recent release, A Cure for Loneliness, being released in 2016. He toured with Kid Rock during the first half of 2008 and continues to tour heavily with his solo band, the Midnight Travelers.

== Members ==
- Seth Justman – keyboards, backing vocals (1968–1985, 1999, 2005, 2006, 2009–2015), lead vocals (1983–1985)
- Danny Klein – bass (1968–1985, 1999, 2005, 2006, 2009–2015)
- Magic Dick – harmonica, saxophone, trumpet (1968–1985, 1999, 2005, 2006, 2009–2015)
- J. Geils – guitar (1968–1985, 1999, 2005, 2006, 2009–2012; died 2017)
- Stephen Jo Bladd – drums, percussion, backing vocals (1968–1985, 2006), lead vocals (1983–1985)
- Peter Wolf – lead vocals (1968–1983, 1999, 2005, 2006, 2009–2015)

=== Touring members ===
- Sim Cain – drums (1999)
- Catherine Russell – backing vocals (1999)
- Andricka Hall – backing vocals (1999, 2010–2015)
- Marty Richards – drums (2005, 2009–2011)
- Mitch Chakour – backing vocals (2009–2011)
- Nichelle Tillman – backing vocals (2010, 2012)
- Duke Levine – rhythm guitar (2009–2011), lead guitar (2012–2015)
- Kevin Barry – rhythm guitar (2012–2015)
- Tom Arey – drums (2012–2015)
- Ada Dyer – backing vocals (2011)
- Cheryl Freeman – backing vocals (2013–2015)

=== The Uptown Horns ===
- Arno Hecht – tenor sax (1982, 1999–2015)
- Crispin Cioe – alto & baritone sax (1982, 1999–2015)
- Paul Litteral – trumpet (1982)
- Larry Etkin – trumpet (1999–2015)
- Bob Funk – trombone (2010)

== Discography ==
Studio albums

- The J. Geils Band (1970)
- The Morning After (1971)
- Bloodshot (1973)
- Ladies Invited (1973)
- Nightmares...and Other Tales from the Vinyl Jungle (1974)
- Hotline (1975)
- Monkey Island (1977)
- Sanctuary (1978)
- Love Stinks (1980)
- Freeze Frame (1981)
- You're Gettin' Even While I'm Gettin' Odd (1984)
