= Magic Dick =

American musician

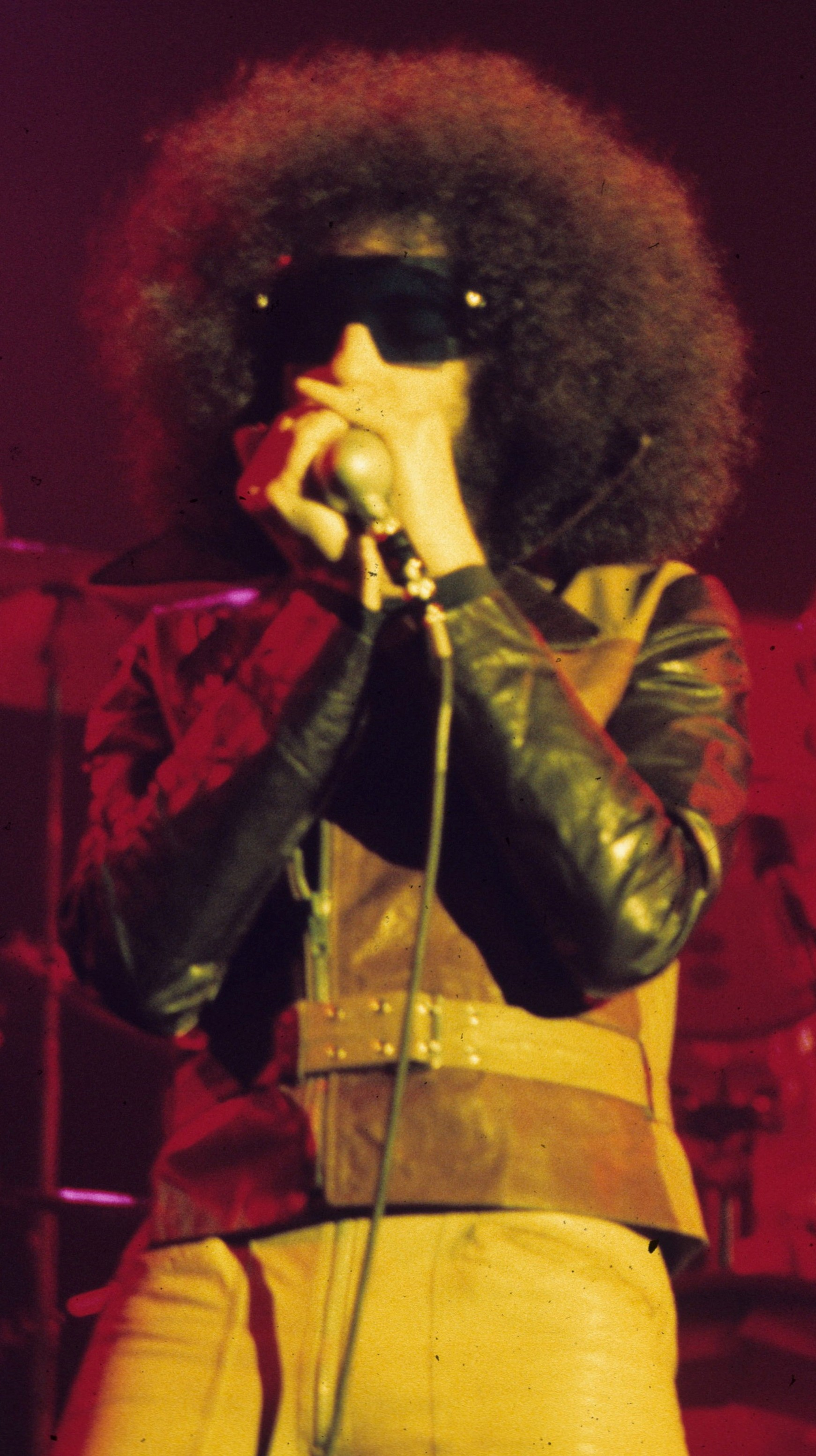

Background information
- Also known as: Magic Dick
- Born: Richard Salwitz; May 13, 1945 (age 81); New London, Connecticut, U.S.
- Genres: Hard rock; blues; jazz
- Occupation: Musician
- Instruments: Harmonica; trumpet; saxophone
- Years active: 1968–present
- Label: Rounder
- Formerly of: The J. Geils Band
- Website: magicdick.com

Richard Salwitz (born May 13, 1945), known as Magic Dick, is an American musician, noted for playing the harmonica for the J. Geils Band. In addition to the harmonica, Salwitz plays the trumpet (the first instrument he learned) and saxophone.

== Early life ==
Salwitz was born in New London, Connecticut. He attended Worcester Polytechnic Institute, in Worcester, Massachusetts, where he met John "J." Geils and Danny Klein and became a founding member of the J. Geils Band in 1965.

== Career ==
=== The J. Geils Band ===
Salwitz's harmonica playing became a major, distinctive element of the J. Geils Band's sound during their hard-rocking 1970s heyday. His performance of "Whammer Jammer" on the band's live album Full House is particularly notable. In The Rolling Stone Record Guide (1979), music critic Dave Marsh described Salwitz as possibly "the best white musician to ever play blues harmonica." He was often referred to as "Magic Dick and his Lickin' Stick".

After the J. Geils Band dissolved in 1985, Salwitz spent time working on a harmonica design of his own, the "Magic Harmonica", for which he received a patent with co-inventor Pierre Beauregard. Beauregard was the director of the Cambridge Harmonica Orchestra, of which Salwitz was also a member.

=== Bluestime ===
In 1992, Salwitz reunited with his old friend and bandmate J. Geils and formed the band Bluestime, with Steve Ramsey on drums, Jerry Miller on guitar, and Rory MacLeod on bass. MacLeod was later replaced by Michael "Mudcat" Ward, who played with the band for several years before leaving to pursue other interests. Ward was subsequently replaced by bassist John Turner. Steve Ramsey left the band in 2000 and was replaced on drums by Gordon Grottenthaller until the band's final show on New Year's Eve 2004 at The Bull Run in Shirley, MA. The band's music fused Chicago blues and classic jazz.

The band released two records on the Rounder Records label: Bluestime (1994) and Little Car Blues (1996). They toured heavily through 2002, and played a handful of shows in 2003 as both a solo act and as part of B.B. King's Bluesfest. They played only 1 show in 2004 on New Year's Eve, which was their final show.

=== Additional blues music ===
Salwitz contributed harmonica and vocals to a live recording, Command Performance, by the Legendary Rhythm & Blues Revue, featuring the Tommy Castro Band, Deanna Bogart, Ronnie Baker Brooks, and others. He toured with the Legendary Rhythm & Blues Revue on various blues cruises and again on land-based shows from 2007 through 2008.

In 2014, Salwitz began collaborating with guitarist and vocalist Shun Ng. "Immediately taken by his arranging, his composing and more particularly by his performance", Salwitz formed a friendship with Shun, who was born in Chicago, raised in Singapore, and based in Boston. They formed an acoustic duo and perform and record music together regularly. They have toured together as part of the Legendary Rhythm & Blues Revue, with artists such as Buddy Guy, Irma Thomas, and Allen Toussaint.

== Personal life ==
Magic Dick is based in the Boston, Massachusetts area. He is Jewish.
