= J. Geils =

American guitarist (1946–2017)

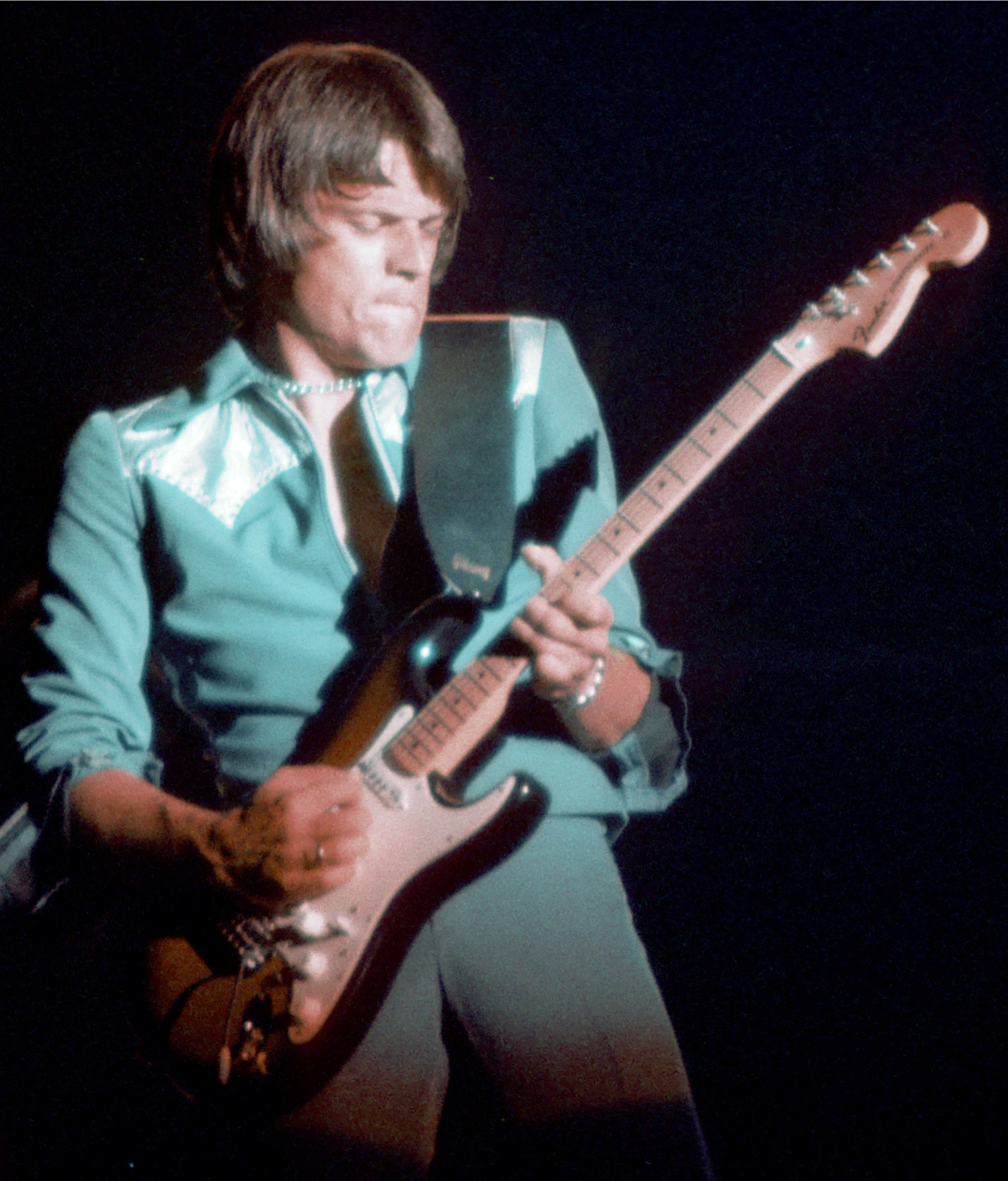

Background information
- Also known as: John Geils
- Born: John Warren Geils Jr. February 20, 1946; New York City, U.S.
- Died: April 11, 2017 (aged 71) Groton, Massachusetts, U.S.
- Genres: Rock; blues; jazz
- Occupations: Musician; songwriter; record producer
- Instrument: Guitar
- Years active: 1967–2012
- Labels: Atlantic; EMI; Rounder; Arbors
- Formerly of: The J. Geils Band

John Warren Geils Jr. (/ɡaɪlz/) (February 20, 1946 – April 11, 2017), was an American guitarist. He was known as the leader of the J. Geils Band.

Growing up in New York City, Geils became interested in jazz and blues. After moving to Massachusetts for his college education, he formed the J. Geils Blues Band while still a student at Worcester Polytechnic Institute. After dropping the word "Blues" from their name, the band released their first album in 1970, performing soul and rhythm and blues-influenced rock music for most of the 1970s before turning to pop music in the 1980s. After the band broke up in 1985, Geils left regular performing to take up restoration and racing of automobiles, with occasional forays into music production. He continued to appear in reunion tours with the rest of his band sporadically during the 2000s and 2010s.

== Early life ==
John Warren Geils Jr. was born on February 20, 1946, in New York City, and grew up in Morris Plains, New Jersey. He was of German ancestry.

In 1959, his family moved to Old Farm Lane in Bedminster, New Jersey. He attended Bernards High School in nearby Bernardsville. Before he graduated in 1964 he was a member of the math club, the physics club, student council, car club, band club and the marching band. He also was a big fan of motorcycles. His father was an engineer at Bell Labs and a jazz fan. From an early age, he heard his father's albums by Benny Goodman, Duke Ellington, and Count Basie, and was escorted by his father to a Louis Armstrong concert. He learned to play Miles Davis music on the trumpet and drums, and he listened to blues singers Howlin' Wolf and Muddy Waters on the radio. In 1964, he began attending Northeastern University and was a trumpeter in the marching band. When he was drawn to folk musicians in Boston, he left Northeastern for Worcester Polytechnic Institute, where he studied mechanical engineering.

== Musical career ==
Geils began playing jazz trumpet but eventually switched to blues guitar. He formed an acoustic blues trio, 'Snoopy and the Sopwith Camels', with bassist Danny Klein and harmonica player Richard "Magic Dick" Salwitz, while studying mechanical engineering at Worcester Polytechnic Institute in the mid-1960s. In late 1965 their line-up consisted of vocalist/saxophone player Peter Kraemer, guitarists Terry MacNeil and William "Truckaway" Sievers, bassist Martin Beard (born 1947, London), and drummer Norman Mayell. They soon moved to Boston, where they added new drummer Stephen Jo Bladd and lead vocalist Peter Wolf, who was a late-night DJ on WBCN. Geils later formed the 'J. Geils Blues Band' with Klein, Salwitz, Bladd, and Wolf, with Seth Justman becoming the final member before the band released its debut album in 1970.

Renamed "The J. Geils Band", the band released eleven albums between 1970 and 1985. Although they were influenced by soul music and rhythm and blues, their musical style was difficult to categorize. Their success was allegedly limited by being "too white for the black kids and too black for the whites".

The band's sound moved toward pop and rock by the time the breakthrough album Love Stinks (EMI, 1980) came out. Their next album, Freeze Frame, produced the song "Centerfold", which sat at number one for six weeks, and the title track, which was a Billboard Top 10 hit.

Tension and conflict arose among band members, and Wolf left to pursue a solo career. The band broke up in 1985. Geils took a break from music to concentrate on auto racing and restoration.

In 2012 he filed a lawsuit against the other band members when they allegedly planned to tour without him while using the band's trademarked name. This prompted him to quit the group permanently.

== Solo career ==
Geils recorded two blues albums with Magic Dick during the 1990s, then formed a jazz trio with guitarists Duke Robillard and Gerry Beaudoin. He released his first solo album, Jay Geils Plays Jazz!, in 2005.

In 2015, Geils was named to the Wall of Honor at his alma mater, Bernards High School, in Bernardsville, New Jersey.

== KTR Motorsports ==
In addition to passing on an interest in jazz, Geils's father took him to auto races in Pennsylvania in the 1950s. Geils became fascinated with Italian sports cars. He drove in five races a year during the early 1980s, at the peak of the J. Geils Band's popularity. He opened KTR Motorsports, an automobile restoration shop in Ayer, Massachusetts to service and repair vintage sports cars such as Ferrari and Maserati. He sold the shop in 1996, though he continued to use the shop and participate in the company.

== Personal life and death ==
In 1982, Geils moved to Groton, Massachusetts. The town honored him by proclaiming J. Geils Day on December 1, 2009. In September 2016, he was arrested and charged with drunk driving after allegedly rear-ending a car in Concord, Massachusetts.

On April 11, 2017, Groton Police conducted a well-being check on Geils and found him unresponsive at his home. He was pronounced dead from natural causes at age 71.

== Discography ==
As Jay Geils

- Bluestime - with Magic Dick (Rounder, 1994)
- Little Car Blues - with Magic Dick (Rounder, 1996)
- Jay Geils Plays Jazz! (Stony Plain, 2005)
- Jay Geils, Gerry Beaudoin and the Kings of Strings featuring Aaron Weinstein (Arbors, 2006)
- Toe Tappin' Jazz (North Star, 2009)

As New Guitar Summit

- New Guitar Summit - with Duke Robillard, Gerry Beaudoin (Stony Plain, 2004)
- Live at the Stoneham Theatre (Stony Plain, 2004)
- Jazzthing II - with Randy Bachman (Koch, 2007)
- Shivers - with Randy Bachman (Stony Plain, 2008)
