= Danny Klein =

American bassist (born 1946)

- Klein in 1977

Background information
- Born: May 23, 1946 (age 80); New York City, U.S.
- Genres: Hard rock; blues
- Occupation: Musician
- Instrument: Bass guitar
- Years active: 1966–present
- Member of: Danny Klein's Full House
- Formerly of: The J. Geils Band

Danny Klein (born May 23, 1946) is an American bassist best known as a member of The J. Geils Band.

== Early life ==
Daniel Klein was born on May 23, 1946, in the Bronx, New York City. He moved to New Jersey at age 6, and in 1964 he began attending Worcester Polytechnic Institute in Massachusetts to study mechanical engineering. There, he met musicians John Geils and Richard Salwitz. By 1966 Klein left WPI to pursue a career in music.

== Musical career ==
While attending college, Klein formed a jug band with Salwitz and Geils. When Peter Wolf, Seth Justman and Stephen Jo Bladd joined they changed their name to The J. Geils Band of which Klein remained a member until their breakup in 1985. Throughout the 1970s, 80s and 90s Klein recorded with artists such as Buddy Guy, Junior Wells and Debbie Davies. He has rejoined The J. Geils Band in all of their reunions and leads his own band, Danny Klein's Full House, which performs J. Geils Band songs.

== Personal life ==
Klein is Jewish.
