= Seth Justman =

American musician (born 1951)

- Born: January 27, 1951 (age 75); Washington, D.C., U.S.
- Genres: Hard rock; blues
- Occupations: Musician; songwriter
- Instruments: Keyboards; vocals
- Years active: 1968–present
- Formerly of: The J. Geils Band

Seth Justman (born January 27, 1951) is an American keyboardist, singer and songwriter. He played keyboards on all albums and tours of the J. Geils Band, in addition to writing or co-writing most of their songs and also singing lead after Peter Wolf's departure from the band.

== Biography ==
Justman was born in Washington, D.C., grew up in Atlantic City, and is Jewish.

He co-wrote many of the band's songs with singer Peter Wolf, and took sole songwriting credits for the band's biggest international hit, "Centerfold" (number 1 for six weeks on the Billboard Hot 100).

Seth is the brother of Paul Justman, director of the 2002 movie, Standing in the Shadows of Motown. Paul and Seth shared songwriting credits for all of the songs on the band's final album, You're Gettin' Even While I'm Gettin' Odd. Justman also became the band's main vocalist following Wolf's departure until the band's first break-up in 1985.

In 1986, Justman produced and partly co-wrote Rockbird, the second solo album by Debbie Harry.
