= Best of The J. Geils Band (2006 album) =

Best of the J. Geils Band

Greatest hits album by The J. Geils Band
- Released: April 4, 2006
- Genre: Rock
- Length: 74:03
- Label: Capitol
- Producer: Various

The J. Geils Band chronology
Looking for a Love (1997)	Best of the J. Geils Band (2006)

Professional ratings
Review scores
Source	Rating
Allmusic	4/5 stars

Best of the J. Geils Band is a compilation album by American rock band The J. Geils Band, released in 2006.

== Track listing ==
No.	Title	Writer(s)	Original album	Length
1.	"Centerfold"	Seth Justman	Freeze-Frame (1981)	3:35
2.	"Freeze-Frame"	Justman; Peter Wolf	Freeze-Frame	3:56
3.	"Come Back" (Single Edit)	Justman; Wolf	Love Stinks (1980)	3:34
4.	"Love Stinks"	Justman; Wolf	Love Stinks	3:46
5.	"Sanctuary"	Justman; Wolf	Sanctuary (1978)	3:53
6.	"Give It to Me" (Single Edit)	Justman; Wolf	Bloodshot (1973)	3:09
7.	"Whammer Jammer" (Live)	Juke Joint Jimmy	Live Full House (1972)	2:46
8.	"Looking for a Love" (Live)	J. W. Alexander; Zelda Samuels	Live Full House	5:04
9.	"Must of Got Lost" (Live)	Justman; Wolf	Blow Your Face Out (1976)	6:35
10.	"Ain't Nothin' but a House Party" (Live)	Del Sharh; Joe Thomas	Blow Your Face Out	5:01
11.	"One Last Kiss"	Justman; Wolf	Sanctuary	4:23
12.	"Teresa"	Justman; Wolf	Sanctuary	3:53
13.	"Angel in Blue"	Justman	Freeze-Frame	4:50
14.	"Flamethrower"	Justman	Freeze-Frame	4:59
15.	"Night Time"	Bob Feldman; Jerry Goldstein; Richard Gottehrer	Love Stinks	4:30
16.	"Just Can't Wait" (Live)	Justman; Wolf	Showtime (1982)	3:28
17.	"I Do" (Live)	Melvin Mason; Johnny Paden; Frank Paden; Jesse Smith; Willie Stephenson	Showtime	3:13
18.	"Piss on the Wall"	Justman; Wolf	Freeze-Frame	3:02
Total length:				74:03

== Personnel ==
=== J. Geils Band ===
- J. Geils – guitar
- Seth Justman – keyboard, vocals
- Peter Wolf – vocals
- Magic Dick – harmonica, trumpet
- Stephen Jo Bladd – percussion, drums, vocals
- Danny Klein – bass

=== Production ===
- Kevin Flaherty – producer, compilation producer
- Susan Lavoie – art direction
- Annie Leibovitz – front cover photography
