= Angel in Blue =

Single by The J. Geils Band

from the album Freeze Frame
- B-side: "River Blindness"
- Released: May 26, 1982
- Recorded: 1981
- Genre: Rock
- Length: 4:51
- Label: EMI
- Songwriter(s): Seth Justman
- Producer(s): Seth Justman

The J. Geils Band singles chronology
"Flamethrower" (1982)	"Angel in Blue" (1982)	"I Do" (1982)

"Angel in Blue" is a song written by Seth Justman that was first released by the J. Geils Band on their 1981 album Freeze Frame. Cissy Houston and Luther Vandross appear on the song as back up vocalists. "Angel in Blue" was also released on a number of J. Geils Band compilation albums, including Centerfold, The Very Best J. Geils Band Album Ever and Best of The J. Geils Band, as well as several multi-artist compilation albums.

== Background ==
Cash Box described "Angel in Blue" as "a story song about how life in the fast lane has turned one beautiful young girl into an emotionally, burnt-out shell" and said that "it has a slow, Phil Spectorish quality that is moving." AllMusic critic Stephen Thomas Erlewine describes the song as "terrific neo-doo wop." Critic Joe Viglione praises it further, stating that it is "arguably the smartest lyric in the J. Geils Band catalogue" with a "strong melody," concluding that it is "four minutes and fifty-one seconds (on the album) of Peter Wolf reading Seth Justman's post-'Centerfold' wet dream." Music critic Robert Christgau states describes the song as "slick get-'em-off trash" about "a whore with a heart of brass that I'm just a sucker for." Mark Coleman of The Rolling Stone Album Guide finds the song to be "haunting." Classic Rock History critic Brian Kachejian named "Angel in Blue" as the band's 8th best song, and noted influences from Bruce Springsteen and Tom Petty.

== Chart performance ==
"Angel in Blue" was released as a single in 1982, where the song reached the Top 40, following the Top 10 hits "Centerfold" and "Freeze Frame" from the Freeze Frame album. It peaked at #40 on the Billboard Hot 100, remaining there for two weeks. It also reached #39 in Canada and #55 in the UK. The song also made the Billboard Singles Radio Action chart in a number of regions, including Buffalo, New York, Annapolis, Maryland, Nashville, Tennessee, and Jacksonville, Florida.
