= Midnight Souvenirs =

Studio album by Peter Wolf
- Released: April 6, 2010
- Studios: Sear Sound, Red House Studio, Joe Music Studio and Crushing Music (New York City, New York); Camp Street Studios (Cambridge, Massachusetts); Middleville Studios (North Reading, Massachusetts); 8H Studios (Boston, Massachusetts); Woolly Mammoth Studios (Waltham, Massachusetts); Shabby Road Studios (Somerville, Massachusetts).
- Genre: Rock
- Length: 49:20
- Label: Verve
- Producers: Peter Wolf, Kenny White

Peter Wolf chronology
Sleepless (2002)	Midnight Souvenirs (2010)	A Cure for Loneliness (2016)

Professional ratings
Review scores
Source	Rating
AllMusic	link
Music Box	4/5 stars

Midnight Souvenirs is the seventh solo album by Peter Wolf. It won the award for Album of the Year at the 2010 Boston Music Awards, was No. 27 on Rolling Stone's list of the 30 Best Albums of 2010. It peaked at No. 45 on the Billboard 200. The album has sold 42,000 copies in the United States as of March 2016.

Eight of the album's songs were co-written with Will Jennings. The track "Thick as Thieves" is a re-imagining of a track from Wolf's second solo album, Come as You Are. Wolf created the album's artwork.

== Track listing ==
1. "Tragedy" (with Shelby Lynne) (Peter Wolf, Angelo Petraglia) – 4:30
2. "I Don't Wanna Know" (David Johnston) – 2:54
3. "Watch Her Move" (Wolf, Taylor Rhodes) – 3:58
4. "There's Still Time" (Will Jennings, Wolf, Bob Thiele, Jr.) – 5:09
5. "Lying Low" (Jennings, Wolf) – 3:12
6. "The Green Fields of Summer" (with Neko Case) (Jennings, Wolf) – 2:57
7. "Thick as Thieves" (Wolf, Tim Mayer) – 2:44
8. "Always Asking for You" (Jennings, Mayer) – 2:58
9. "Then It Leaves Us All Behind" (Jennings, Mayer) – 3:33
10. "Overnight Lows" (Wolf, Petraglia, Chuck Prophet) – 5:07
11. "Everything I Do Gonna Be Funky" (Allen Toussaint) – 2:14
12. "Don't Try and Change Her" (Jennings, Mayer) – 3:33
13. "The Night Comes Down (For Willy DeVille)" (Jennings, Mayer) – 3:57
14. "It's Too Late For Me" (with Merle Haggard) (Jennings, Mayer) – 2:47

== Personnel ==
- Peter Wolf – vocals, harmonica (7, 12), backing vocals (7)
- Kenny White – acoustic piano (1), congas (1, 3, 12), keyboards (2–6, 9–14), guitars (4, 6), bass (7), backing vocals (7)
- Larry Campbell – guitars (1–4, 6, 7, 9–13), pedal steel guitar (2), fiddle (2, 4, 6), mandolin (12)
- Duke Levine – guitars (1, 2, 3, 5, 8–14), mandola (2, 6), banjo (5), mandolin (13)
- Kevin Barry – guitars (8, 14), lap steel guitar (8)
- Paul Bryan – bass (1–4, 6, 9–13)
- Marty Ballou – upright bass (5, 8, 14)
- Shawn Pelton – drums (1–4, 6–14)
- Marty Richards – drums (5)
- Crispin Cioe – alto saxophone (1, 4, 13)
- Arno Hecht – tenor saxophone (1, 4, 13)
- Anil Oulianine – cello (4, 6, 9)
- Anja Wood – cello (4, 6, 9)
- Chris Cardona – violin (4, 6, 9)
- Jonathan Dinklage – violin (4, 6, 9)
- Antoine Silverman – violin (4, 6, 9), string arrangements (4, 6, 9)
- Entcho Toldorov – violin (4, 6, 9)
- David Johnston – cellphone intro (7)
- Shelby Lynne – vocals (1)
- Ada Dyer – backing vocals (1, 3, 4, 6, 8, 9, 12, 13)
- Catherine Russell – backing vocals (1, 3, 4, 6, 8, 9, 12, 13)
- Babi Floyd – backing vocals (2)
- Mike Harvey – backing vocals (2, 10, 14)
- Neko Case – vocals (6)
- Kris Delmhorst – harmony vocals (6, 9)
- James "D-Train" Williams – backing vocals (10, 14)
- Merle Haggard – vocals (14)

Production

- Kenny White – producer
- Peter Wolf – producer, assistant engineer (1, 2, 4, 6, 9–13), mixing (3), drawings, art design, booklet cover photography, inside cover photography
- Rob Eaton – engineer (1, 2, 4, 6, 9–13), mixing (2, 4, 9, 10, 11, 13)
- Dave Westner – engineer (1, 2, 4, 6, 9–13), mixing (3), additional engineer
- Ben Wisch – mixing (1, 5–8, 12, 14), engineer (7)
- Paul Q. Koldarie – engineer (3, 8, 14)
- Chris Rival – engineer (5)
- Chris Allen – assistant engineer (1, 2, 4, 6, 9–13)
- Joshua K. Burghardt - assistant engineer (1, 2, 4, 6, 9-13)
- Alex Heartman – assistant engineer (3, 8, 14)
- Adam Taylor – assistant engineer (3, 8, 14)
- Joe Blaney – additional engineer
- Adam Brass – additional engineer
- Charlton Pettus – additional engineer
- John Squicciarino – additional engineer
- Bob Ludwig – mastering at Gateway Mastering (Portland, Maine)
- Sue Drew – project coordinator
- Jill Dell'Abate – session coordinator
- Tracy Berglund – art design, CD tray and back cover photography
- Bobby DiMarco – additional design assistance, CD clock design
- Jazz Martin – additional design assistance, CD clock design
- Frank Olinsky – graphic consulting, CD clock design
- Jon Strymish – booklet back cover photography
- Joe Stewart – photography

== Charts ==
Chart (2010)	Peak position
US Billboard 200	45
US Top Rock Albums (Billboard)	12
US Indie Store Album Sales (Billboard)	14
