= Fool's Parade =

Studio album by Peter Wolf
- Released: September 29, 1998
- Recorded: Sear Sound, New York City
- Genre: Rock
- Length: 42:28
- Label: Mercury
- Producer: Peter Wolf; Stanley Jordan; Taylor Rhodes; Kenny White

Peter Wolf chronology
Long Line (1996)	Fool's Parade (1998)	Sleepless (2002)

Professional ratings
Review scores
Source	Rating
AllMusic	4/5 stars

Fool's Parade is the fifth solo album by Peter Wolf, released in 1998 (see 1998 in music). The album was named one of the Essential Recordings of the '90s by Rolling Stone's Jann Wenner.

== Background and Recording ==
According to a Jan. 1999 interview with NPR promoting ‘Fools Parade’ at the time, Wolf stated that his goal with the album was to incorporate the ‘Memphis Sound’ that was inspired by the “warmth” of 1960’s Sunn & Stax recordings. Wolf stated: “I found myself going back to the records from Memphis. The records from Sunn, Sam Phillips’ records […] and later Stax recordings, and then Muscle Shoals was a great impact. I was listening to a record by Arthur Alexander, and just the warmth of those recordings, and the approach of those recordings. Basically they were very intimate, good songs, done in a small room, in an intimate atmosphere. [They were] using great old warm tube equipment that was the standard equipment of the time. Great players, and you a got a certain [kind of] feeling that I felt had been lost in many contemporary records. For myself, I really wanted to get back to that approach, and that’s how I proceeded as the blueprint for ‘Fools Parade’."

Lyrically, Wolf stated “in gathering the songs for this record, I tried to choose and stay in a direction where there was a certain amount of intimacy that dealt with a lot of what was going on in my life. In the trials and tribulations of my life, on my last album I had this song “Long Line”. […] and what I meant by that, there was a lineage. As a young kid growing up in the Bronx, taking the subway down to Times Square records, and hearing young doo-wop groups. Dion and The Belmonts, Frankie Lymon and The Teenagers, the School Boys. Great New York doo-wop groups. Hearing these bands, and then coming up to Boston to study painting, and hearing that Muddy Waters was in town, and I’m 17 years old and I’m helping him carry equipment and amplifiers, and I ended up becoming his unofficial valet when he was in the New England area. Then I put together a band later on when I was 18 or 19, and playing with people like Muddy Waters, Howlin’ Wolf, and John Lee Hooker, Mose Allison. There was this long line, this lineage that these great artists like Waters & Hooker that grew up in Mississippi and they brought it with them up North. Then they went to England and inspired people like The Rolling Stones and many different bands like The Beatles, then they came back here and inspired people like myself.”

== Track listing ==
1. "Long Way Back Again" (Will Jennings, Wolf) – 3:43
2. "Turnin' Pages" (Taylor Rhodes, Wolf) – 3:38
3. "Anything at All" (Jennings, John L. Keller, Wolf) – 4:30
4. "Pleasing to Me" (Jennings, Wolf) – 3:36
5. "The Cold Heart of the Stone" (Jennings, Wolf) – 3:02
6. "All Torn Up" (Rhodes, Wolf) – 4:13
7. "Roomful of Angels" (Rhodes, Wolf) – 4:29
8. "If You Wanna Be with Somebody" (Steve Jordan, Wolf) – 4:01
9. "I'd Rather Be Blind, Crippled and Crazy" (Darryl Carter, Charles Hodges, O. V. Wright) – 3:31
10. "Ride Lonesome, Ride Hard" (Jennings, Wolf) – 4:05
11. "Waiting on the Moon" (Jennings, Wolf) – 3:40

== Personnel ==
- Peter Wolf – vocals, backing vocals (7, 10)
- Leon Pendarvis – keyboards (1, 2, 8, 9, 10), backing vocals (10)
- Kenny White – keyboards (1–6, 9, 11), guitars (8, 10), backing vocals (8, 10), bass (9)
- Steve Jordan – keyboards (8), guitars (8), bass (8), drums (8)
- Cornell Dupree – guitars (1, 9)
- Duke Levine – guitars (1–6, 9, 10, 11), backing vocals (10)
- Jeff Golub – guitars (2, 6, 11)
- Taylor Rhodes – guitars (2, 7), backing vocals (2, 7)
- Jimmy Vivino – guitars (6)
- Johnny A. – guitars (10), backing vocals (10)
- Will Lee – bass (1, 2, 10), backing vocals (10)
- John Conte – bass (3–7, 11)
- Shawn Pelton – drums (1–5, 7, 10, 11), backing vocals (10)
- Tony Beard – drums (6, 9)
- Bashiri Johnson – percussion (1–6, 8–11), backing vocals (10)
- Marco Vitali – violin (1, 11)
- The Uptown Horns (4, 6, 9)
  - Crispin Cioe – saxophones
  - Arno Hecht – saxophones
  - Bob Funk – trombone
  - Larry Etkin – trumpet
- Ada Dyer – backing vocals (2, 4, 6, 7, 9, 10), vocals (4)
- Robert White Johnson – backing vocals (2)
- Curtis King – backing vocals (2, 4, 5, 6, 8, 9)
- Vaneese Thomas – backing vocals (2, 4, 6, 7, 9, 10)
- Teresa Williams – backing vocals (3)
- Steve Conte – backing vocals (5), guitars (9)

Technical personnel

- Peter Wolf – producer
- Kenny White – producer
- Taylor Rhodes – producer (7), additional engineer
- Steve Jordan – producer (8), additional engineer
- Rob Eaton – engineer, mixing
- Dave Fisher – assistant engineer
- Karen Rome – assistant engineer
- Ted Jensen – mastering at Sterling Sound (New York, NY)
- Bob Ludwig – mastering at Gateway Mastering (Portland, ME)
- Jayne Gradd – project coordinator
- Margery Greenspan – art direction
- Nancy Hodgins – photography
- Ken Schles – photography
