= Long line =

Long line or longline may refer to:

- Long Line, an album by Peter Wolf
- Long line (topology), or Alexandroff line, a topological space
- Long line (telecommunications), a transmission line in a long-distance communications network
- Longline fishing, a commercial fishing technique
- AT&T Long Lines, a telecommunications network
- AT&T Long Lines Building, now known as 33 Thomas Street, a building in New York City
- Aerial crane or longline, a transport method
- Peripherally inserted central catheter, a medical device
