= A Cure for Loneliness =

Studio album by Peter Wolf
- Released: April 8, 2016
- Studios: Middleville Studios (North Reading, MA); Woolly Mammoth Studios (Waltham, MA); Karina's Kitchen; Stone Mountain Arts Center (Brownfield, ME); Sear Sound and Red House Studio (New York, NY); The Loft (Bronxville, NY).
- Genre: Rock
- Length: 37:55
- Label: Concord
- Producers: Peter Wolf, Kenny White

Peter Wolf chronology
Midnight Souvenirs (2010)	A Cure for Loneliness (2016)

A Cure for Loneliness is the eighth studio album by American musician Peter Wolf. It was released on April 8, 2016, by Concord Records.

== Reception ==
Professional ratings
Aggregate scores
Source	Rating
Metacritic	76/100
Review scores
Source	Rating
AllMusic	3.5/5 stars
American Songwriter	4/5 stars
Blurt	4/5 stars
Classic Rock	3/5 stars
Rolling Stone	4/5 stars
Rock & Folk	4/5 stars

A Cure for Loneliness received positive reviews from critics upon release. On Metacritic, the album holds a score of 76/100 based on 7 reviews, indicating "generally favorable reviews".

== Track listing ==
No.	Title	Writer(s)	Length
1.	"Rolling On"	Peter Wolf, Will Jennings	4:07
2.	"It Was Always So Easy (To Find an Unhappy Woman)"	A.L. "Doodle" Owens, Sanger D. Shafer	2:41
3.	"Peace of Mind"	Peter Wolf, Will Jennings, Duke Levine	3:48
4.	"How Do You Know"	Peter Wolf, Will Jennings	3:07
5.	"Fun for a While"	Peter Wolf, Tim Mayer	3:36
6.	"Wastin' Time (Live)"	Peter Wolf	4:00
7.	"Some Other Time, Some Other Place"	Peter Wolf, Will Jennings	3:51
8.	"It's Raining"	Peter Wolf, Don Covay	4:19
9.	"Love Stinks (Live)"	Peter Wolf, Seth Justman	2:25
10.	"Mr. Mistake"	Peter Wolf, Tim Mayer	1:43
11.	"Tragedy"	Fred Burch, Gerald Nelson	2:46
12.	"Stranger"	Irene Stanton, Wayne Walker	1:32

== Personnel ==
- Peter Wolf – vocals, harmonica (1, 2, 4–7), backing vocals (2)
- Kenny White – keyboards (1–5, 7, 8, 10, 11), backing vocals (2)
- Tom West – keyboards (6)
- Duke Levine – guitars (1–8, 10, 11, 12), backing vocals (6, 9), mandolin (9)
- Kevin Barry – guitars (1, 2, 3, 6, 8–11), lap steel guitar (5), backing vocals (9)
- Larry Campbell – guitars (4, 7), pedal steel guitar (7), fiddle (7)
- Marty Ballou – bass (1, 2, 3, 5, 6, 8–11), backing vocals (9)
- Paul Bryan – bass (4)
- Tony Garnier – bass (7)
- Shawn Pelton – drums (1–5, 7, 8, 10, 11)
- Thomas Arey – drums (6)
- Uptown Horns (4)
  - Crispin Cioe – saxophones
  - Arno Hecht – saxophones
  - Bob Funk – trombone
  - Larry Etkin – trumpet
- Paul Ahlstrand – horns (8)
- Jeff Ramsey – backing vocals (1, 3, 8)
- Athene Wilson – backing vocals (1, 3, 8)
- Aaron Lippert – backing vocals (2)
- Ada Dyer – backing vocals (4)
- Catherine Russell – backing vocals (4)
- Teresa Williams – backing vocals (7)
- Kris Delmhorst – backing vocals (11)
- Rose Polenzani – backing vocals (11)

=== Production ===
- Kenny White – producer
- Peter Wolf – producer
- Chris Rival – engineer and recording (1, 2, 3, 5, 6, 8, 10, 11)
- Rob Eaton – engineer (4, 7), mixing (7)
- David Westner – additional engineer and recording (1, 2, 3, 5, 6, 8, 10, 11), engineer and recording (9)
- Tom Dube – recording (12)
- Tom Schick – mixing (1, 2, 3, 5, 6, 8–12)
- Ben Wisch – mixing (4)
- Bob Ludwig – mastering at Gateway Mastering (Portland, Maine)
- Carrie Smith – package design
- Grace O'Connor – paintings
- Joe Greene – photography

== Charts ==
Chart (2016)	Peak position
US Billboard 200	144
US Americana/Folk Albums (Billboard)	5
US Top Rock Albums (Billboard)	18
US Indie Store Album Sales (Billboard)	14
