= Lights Out (Peter Wolf song) =

1984 single by Peter Wolf

Single by Peter Wolf

from the album Lights Out
- Released: July 1984
- Studio: Syncro Sound (Boston, Massachusetts)
- Genre: Dance-rock; electro; funk; pop
- Length: 4:27
- Label: EMI America
- Songwriters: Peter Wolf; Don Covay
- Producers: Michael Jonzun; Peter Wolf

Peter Wolf singles chronology
"Lights Out" (1984)	"I Need You Tonight" (1984)

Music video
- "Lights Out" on YouTube

"Lights Out" is a song by American rock singer Peter Wolf, formerly of the J. Geils Band, as the epynonymous track from his debut solo album, Lights Out. It was released as a single in 1984 and became his biggest solo hit on the Billboard Hot 100, peaking at #12.

== Reception ==
The song entered the Hot 100 at No. 56 on July 14, 1984, and reached its peak position of No. 12 on September 8, 1984.

AllMusic described the song as a "bouncing, machine funk monster" and a "raft of catchy, candy-coated '80s pop". Cashbox commented that "Peter Wolf displays the same, soulfoul [sic], gritty vocals that marked his tenure with [the J. Geils Band]".

== In popular culture ==
The song appeared on the soundtrack to the Rob Reiner film The Sure Thing.

== Personnel ==
- Peter Wolf - lead vocals
- Elliot Easton, Elliott Randall, Ed Stasium, Rick "Rice" Peppers - guitar
- Michael Jonzun, Leon Mobley, Gordon Worthy, Peter Wolf - congas
- Robin Beck, Will Lee, Peter Wolf, Michael Jonzun - backing vocals
- Yogi Horton - percussion
- Will Lee - bass
- Gordon Worthy - keyboards
- P-Funk Horns Section - horns

== Weekly charts ==
Chart (1984)	Peak position
Australia (Kent Music Report)	46
Canada RPM Top Singles	15
U.S. Billboard Hot 100	12
US Mainstream Rock (Billboard)	6

== Samples ==
The song was sampled by novelty artist Dickie Goodman in "Election '84".
