= Fools Parade =

Fools' Parade or Fool's Parade may refer to:

- Fools' Parade, American 1971 drama film
- Fool's Parade, album by Peter Wolf
