= Johnny A. =

American songwriter (born 1952)

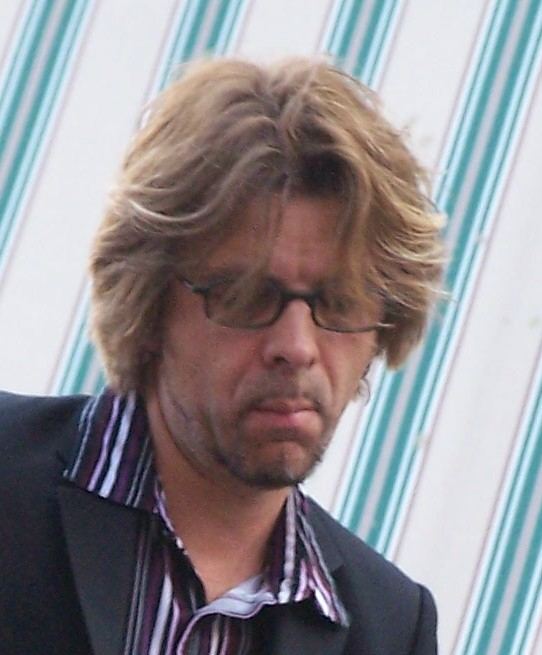
- Johnny A. playing at the Twilight Festival on June 14, 2007

Background information
- Also known as: Jonny A.
- Born: November 14, 1952 (age 73); Malden, Massachusetts, US
- Genres: Instrumental rock, jazz, blues
- Instrument: Guitar
- Years active: 1966–present
- Labels: Aglaophone Records, Favored Nations, Artemis
- Website: www.johnnya.com

John Antonopoulos (born November 14, 1952, in Malden, Massachusetts, United States), known professionally as Johnny A., is an American guitarist, and songwriter.

== Early life ==
Johnny A. was born in Malden, Massachusetts, of Greek heritage. Growing up in the Boston area, he became interested in music, starting with drums at the age six. Upon being exposed to The Beatles in 1964 at the age of 11, Johnny's parents bought him a $49 Lafayette Electronics guitar. He stated his last name, Antonopoulos, which is of Greek origin, was frequently mispronounced. "It's always been Johnny A. since age eight.”

== Career ==
=== 1970s ===
In the 1970s, Johnny A. formed a band called The Streets, performing mostly in the Boston area. They had several popular radio singles, including "What Gives", which reached the top spot on WBCN "The Rock of Boston". As well as headlining in Boston clubs, The Streets toured with and supported several major artists including Aerosmith and Bob Seger. They also competed in the first WBCN "Rock 'n' Roll Rumble" in 1979.

=== 1980s–1990s ===
In 1980, Johnny formed the band Hidden Secret. They had several local hit singles including "No More Lonely Nights," which occupied the top spot on WBCN for 26 weeks.

His next band, Hearts On Fire, placed second after Gang Green in the 1986 WBCN Rock & Roll Rumble, and continued to produce local hit singles, including "Miss Me Bad," which was the number one local song on WBCN for thirty-three weeks.

Throughout the 1980s and 1990s, while working as a sideman, Johnny played with Santana percussionist Mingo Lewis, blues and soul duo Delaney & Bonnie, Derek & the Dominos keyboardist Bobby Whitlock, and briefly with Creedence Clearwater Revival drummer Doug Clifford. He then began a seven-year role as guitarist and musical director for the J. Geils Band front man Peter Wolf. He played on Wolf's albums, co-produced his album Long Line, and joined him on world tours.

In 1999, Johnny A. launched his solo career and independently released his debut CD Sometime Tuesday Morning.

=== 2000s ===
In 2000, Johnny A. signed a licensing deal to re-release his first album with Steve Vai's Favored Nations Entertainment.

In 2001, Sometime Tuesday Morning was re-released on Vai's Favored Nations Entertainment label Sony/RED distribution. The album spawned the #1 single "Oh Yeah" across the USA on the AAA radio format. It marked the first time in over a decade that an instrumental had achieved the top spot on radio. Sometime Tuesday Morning sold over 150,000 copies.

In 2003, Sometime Tuesday Morning was then picked up for distribution by Danny Goldberg at Artemis Records, and Gibson Custom Guitar company, in close collaboration with Johnny, released a "Johnny A." Signature Model guitar, designed to the artist's specifications.

Creating an artist signature model guitar is not something we take lightly. But sometimes a player comes along who is not only a musical innovator and artist of the highest-caliber, but has innovative ideas about designing a totally new instrument. And that's Johnny, who just knocked us off our feet.

— Rick Gembar, Gibson Guitars Senior VP

In 2003, Johnny A. signed a multi-record contract with Steve Vai's Sony/Red distributed Favored Nations Entertainment and saw the release of the "radio-only" promotional Johnny A. Christmas single "Sleigh Ride", released on the label.

In 2004, Get Inside was released on the Favored Nations Label, yielding two radio singles, "I Had To Laugh", which made the Grammy nominations ballot, and a radio edit of the title track "Get Inside".

In 2006, Warner Bros./Alfred Publishing released a Johnny A. instructional DVD entitled Taste, Tone, Space.

In 2007, Gibson Custom guitar company released a second Johnny A. signature guitar, the Johnny A. Standard.

=== 2010s ===
In 2010, Johnny A. released One November Night (2010 Aglaophone Records), a live DVD/ CD set recorded at Sculler's Jazz Club in his hometown of Boston, Massachusetts. In 2010, Johnny also became the recipient of The Boston Music Award's Blues Artist of the Year 2010.

In June 2014, Johnny A. released, Driven, marking his engineering debut, as well as mixing and producing. On this album he played every instrument. On December 14, 2014, Johnny was inducted into the Boston Music Hall of Fame at the Boston Music Awards. The same year, Gibson Custom released a "new" version of the Johnny A. Standard.

In 2015, Johnny A. joined The Yardbirds, touring and playing with the group as lead guitarist. On July 23, 2018, after playing with the band for three years, he announced on his website that he would not be appearing at any future Yardbirds performances.

In 2017, Epiphone guitar company released the limited-edition Johnny A. Custom Outfit, which comprised a guitar, case, and autographed certificate of authenticity.

=== 2020s ===
In 2020, during the COVID-19 lockdown, Johnny A. broadcast a 90-minute free morning livestream from his Facebook page. This ran for five days a week, producing over 300 episodes.

In 2021, also during the COVID-19 lockdown, Johnny A. recorded a 21-song, instrumental re-imagining of songs by The Beatles under the working title "From A. To Beatles," which is yet to be released.

On September 15, 2022, the Fender Custom Shop launched the Johnny A. "Signature" Stratocaster made to the artist's specifications and released in two first-time colors for Fender; Lydian Gold Metallic with chrome hardware and Sunset Glow Metallic with gold hardware.

== Style ==
Johnny's style often recalls Danny Gatton, as well as some aspects of Jeff Beck and Pat Martino. He encompasses elements of rock, jazz, and blues, and he often uses a whammy bar. He cites artists such as The Beatles, The Yardbirds, Everly Brothers, Wes Montgomery, Chet Atkins, Jeff Beck, Jimi Hendrix and Les Paul as many of his musical influences.

== Discography ==
=== Sometime Tuesday Morning ===
Release 1999 (Aglaophone Records) - International Re-Release 2001 (Favored Nations/Aglaophone Records)
Tracks:
1. "Sometime Tuesday Morning"
2. "Oh Yeah"
3. "Wichita Lineman"
4. "Two Wheel Horse"
5. "In The Wind"
6. "Yes It Is"
7. "You Don't Love Me"
8. "Up In The Attic"
9. "Walk Don't Run"
10. "Tex Critter"
11. "Lullabye For Nicole"
12. "Walkin' West Ave."

=== "Sleigh Ride" ===
2002 Radio Promo Single (Favored Nations/Aglaophone Records)
Tracks:
1. "Sleigh Ride"
2. "Oh Yeah"

=== Get Inside ===
2004 (Favored Nations)
Tracks:
1. "Hip Bone"
2. "I Had To Laugh"
3. "Poor Side of Town"
4. "Sing Singin'"
5. "Get Inside"
6. "Bundle Of Joy"
7. "Krea Gata"
8. "The Wind Cries Mary"
9. "Ignorance Is Bliss"
10."Sway A Little"
11."Stimulation"
12."Another Life"

=== Taste • Tone • Space ===
2006 (Alfred Publishing)
Instructional Guitar DVD

=== One November Night ===
2010 – Live DVD/CD 2 – Disc Set (Aglaophone Records)
Tracks:
1. "I Had To Laugh"
2. "Sing Singin'"
3. "The Wind Cries Mary"
4. "Tex Critter"
5. "Lullabye For Nicole"
6. "Two Wheel Horse"
7. "Get Inside"
8. "The Night Before"
9. "Krea Gata"
10."Ignorance Is Bliss"
11."Wichita Lineman"
12."Memphis, Tennessee"
13."Jimi Jam"
14."Walk Away Renée"

=== Driven ===
2014 – (Aglaophone Records)
Tracks:
1. "Ghost"
2. "A Mask You Wear"
3. "C'mon, C'mon"
4. "The Night I Said Goodbye"
5. "From A Dark Place"
6. "To Love Somebody"
7. "Out Of Nowhere"
8. "The Arizona Man"
9. "It Must Have Been You"
10."Backbone Slip"
11."Gone... (Like a Sunset)"

=== Other contributions ===
- Bobby Whitlock Live at The Bottom Line – NYC −10/92 (1992)
- For The Love Of Harry, (tribute to Harry Nilsson) Peter Wolf & The Houseparty 5 (1995), guitar (uncredited) "You're Breakin' My Heart"
- Long Line, Peter Wolf (1996), guitar/co-producer
- Fool's Parade, Peter Wolf (1998), guitar on "Ride Lonesome, Ride Hard"
- Beloved Few, Beloved Few (1998) bajo sexto on the song "The Beloved Few"
- Sometime Tuesday Morning songbook Warner Bros./Alfred Publishing (2001)
- WYEP Live and Direct: Volume 4 – On Air Performances (2002) "Tex Critter"
- Get Inside songbook – Alfred Publishing (2004)
- One Last Wish, Stu Kimball (2006) featured guitarist on the songs "Little One" and "Elation"
- Counting Down, The Brooks Young Band (2010) featured guitarist on the title song "Counting Down"
- Just Across The River, Jimmy Webb (2010) featured guitarist on the song "Galveston"
- Jim McCarty and Friends Live from Callahan's, Jim McCarty (2011) Johnny A. co-wrote with and is featured with Jim McCarty on the songs "J&A Jump" and "South Boulevard Blues"
- Thank You Les, CD and documentary tribute to Les Paul (2012). Johnny A. is featured on the song "Sweet Georgia Brown"
- Beautiful, Jerad Finck featuring Johnny A. (2012) featured guitarist on the song "Beautiful"
- Deja Blues, Gary Hoey (2013) lead/rhythm and slide guitars on the song "She's Walking"
- Two Roads East, Jon Butcher (2016) featured solo on the song "Transcendence"
- Eye Of The Writer, Jim Peterik (2016) featured guitarist on the song "Vehicle"
- Temple of Blues - Influences and Friends, CACTUS (2024) featured guitarist on the song "Alaska"
- TOWNIE - A movie starring Steve Sweeney - Johnny A. music composer
