= List of Canadian number-one albums of 1982 =

These are the Canadian number-one albums of 1982. The charts were compiled and published by RPM every Saturday.

== Number-one albums ==
†	This indicates the best performing album of the year.

Issue date	Album	Artist	Ref
January 2	The Great White North	Bob and Doug McKenzie	
January 9	The Great White North	Bob and Doug McKenzie	
January 16	The Great White North	Bob and Doug McKenzie	
January 23	The Great White North	Bob and Doug McKenzie	
January 30	Tonight I'm Yours	Rod Stewart	
February 6	Tonight I'm Yours	Rod Stewart	
February 13	Freeze Frame	The J. Geils Band	
February 20	Freeze Frame	The J. Geils Band	
February 27	Freeze Frame	The J. Geils Band	
March 6	Freeze Frame	The J. Geils Band	
March 13	Freeze Frame	The J. Geils Band	
March 20	I Love Rock 'n' Roll	Joan Jett and the Blackhearts	
March 27	I Love Rock 'n' Roll	Joan Jett and the Blackhearts	
April 3	I Love Rock 'n' Roll	Joan Jett and the Blackhearts	
April 10	Freeze Frame	The J. Geils Band	
April 17	Freeze Frame	The J. Geils Band	
April 24	Freeze Frame	The J. Geils Band	
May 1	Freeze Frame	The J. Geils Band	
May 8	Dare	The Human League	
May 15	Freeze Frame	The J. Geils Band	
May 22	Asia	Asia	
May 29	Asia	Asia	
June 5	Asia	Asia	
June 12	Tug of War	Paul McCartney	
June 19	Tug of War	Paul McCartney	
June 26	Tug of War	Paul McCartney	
July 3	Tug of War	Paul McCartney	
July 10	Business as Usual †	Men at Work	
July 17	Business as Usual †	Men at Work	
July 24	Still Life	The Rolling Stones	
July 31	Avalon	Roxy Music	
August 7	Avalon	Roxy Music	
August 14	Pictures at Eleven	Robert Plant	
August 21	Pictures at Eleven	Robert Plant	
August 28	Pictures at Eleven	Robert Plant	
September 4	Avalon	Roxy Music	
September 11	Avalon	Roxy Music	
September 18	American Fool	John Cougar	
September 25	American Fool	John Cougar	
October 2	American Fool	John Cougar	
October 9	Signals	Rush	
October 16	Signals	Rush	
October 23	Signals	Rush	
October 30	Business as Usual †	Men at Work	
November 6	Business as Usual †	Men at Work	
November 13	Business as Usual †	Men at Work	
November 20	Business as Usual †	Men at Work	
November 27	Business as Usual †	Men at Work	
December 4	Business as Usual †	Men at Work	
December 11	...Famous Last Words...	Supertramp	
December 18	...Famous Last Words...	Supertramp	
December 25	...Famous Last Words...	Supertramp	

== See also ==
- List of Canadian number-one singles of 1982
