= Sean Mason =

American jazz pianist and composer

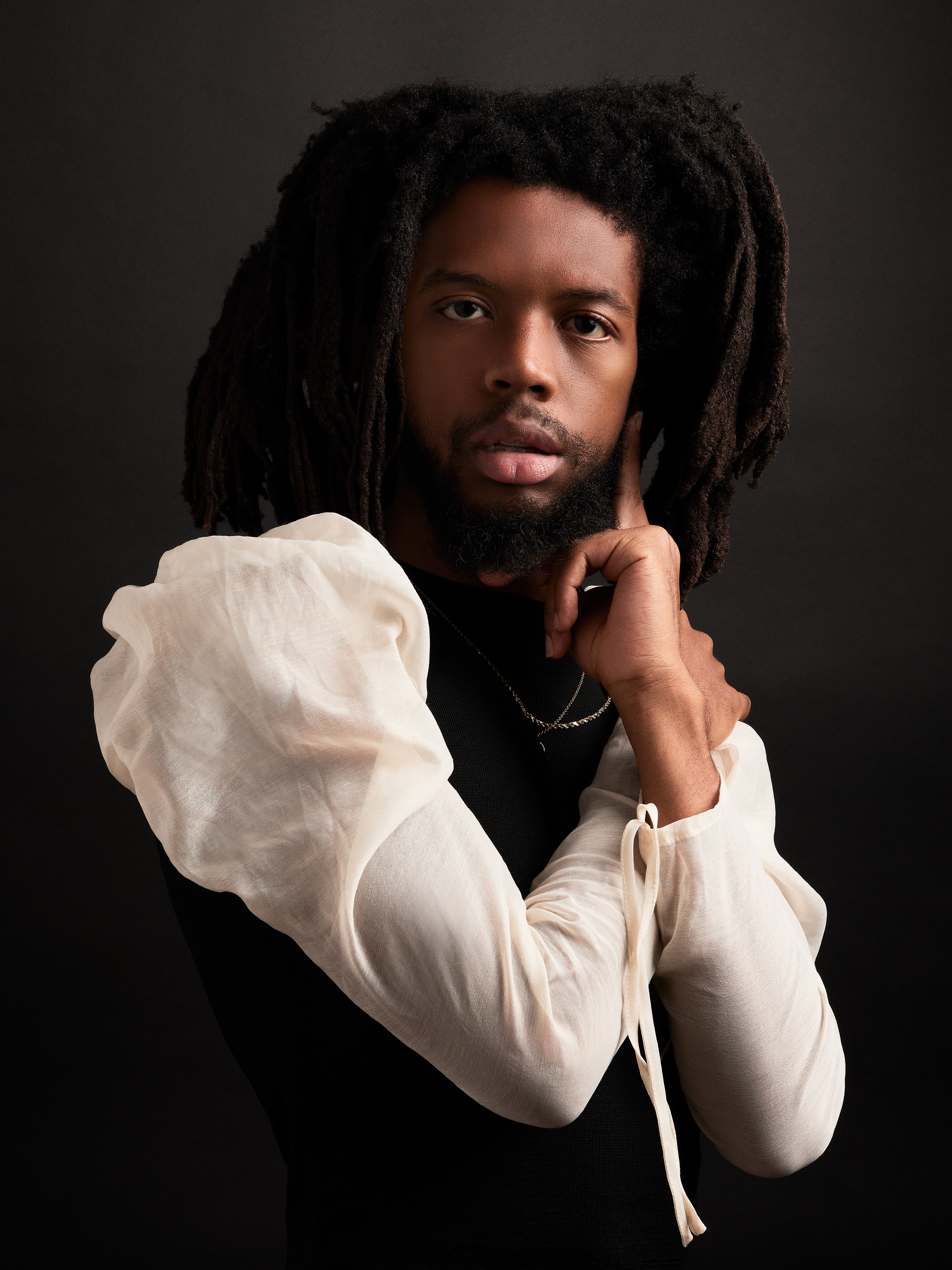
- Mason in 2023

Background information
- Born: Sean Mason; Charlotte, North Carolina, U.S.
- Education: The Juilliard School; UNC Greensboro
- Genre: Jazz
- Occupations: Musician; composer; record producer
- Instrument: Piano
- Years active: 2015–present
- Label: Blue Engine Records Taylor Christian Records
- Website: seanmason.net

Sean Mason is an American jazz pianist, composer, and record producer. He has been nominated for a Grammy Award and is the recipient of a Bessie Award and Bistro Award. In 2023, he released his debut album, The Southern Suite, and in 2024 co-released Chrome Valley with Mahogany L. Browne and My Ideal with Catherine Russell. In 2025, he released A Breath of Fresh Air.

== Early life and education ==
Sean Mason was born and raised in Charlotte, North Carolina. He began teaching himself how to play piano at age 13, influenced by the music of Ray Charles. At age 15, he enrolled in the JazzArts Initiative Camp and attended Phillip O. Berry Academy of Technology for high school. At age 17, Mason won the inaugural Loomis McGlohon Young Jazz Competition, an award that included an opportunity to perform as guest soloist with Delfeayo Marsalis.

In 2017, while attending UNC Greensboro, Mason met Branford Marsalis who was giving lessons there. He suggested that Mason apply to Juilliard and Marsalis told his brother (Wynton Marsalis, director of Juilliard Jazz) "Sean can really play" and to "be on the lookout for this kid." Mason was subsequently accepted and enrolled in Juilliard in 2018, moving to New York City for his studies.

== Career ==
In 2018, Mason began performing in New York jazz clubs as a sideman. He also led the "Sean Mason Trio," featuring bassist Butler Knowles and drummer Malcolm Charles, performing at jazz venues such as Dizzy's Club and Smoke Jazz Club. In 2019, the trio maintained an "After-Hours" residency at Smalls Jazz Club.

In 2020, he played piano in Ma Rainey's Black Bottom and in 2021, played piano in the Emmy nominated documentary, Tulsa Burning: The 1921 Race Massacre, as well as the Netflix film Rustin. In theater, Mason has been involved in various musical roles in Broadway productions such as Hadestown and Phantom of the Opera and has served as music director for The Soapbox Presents, a Harlem-based performing arts organization.

In 2022, Mason was included in the inaugural Youngblood's class by NPR's "Jazz Night in America," described by the program as a "sub-series featuring five up-and-coming jazz geniuses who are revolutionizing the genre." Also in 2022, he formed the Sean Mason Quintet, featuring Tony Glausi (trumpet), Chris Lewis (tenor saxophone), Felix Moseholm (bass), and Domo Branch (drums). The group was part of "Jazz at Lincoln Center Emerging Artist" initiative.

In 2023, Mason released his debut album, The Southern Suite, as a leader, featuring his quintet. It was released on Blue Engine Records, Jazz at Lincoln Center's in-house label, and received favorable reviews. The Bitter Southerner named it one of the 20 Best Southern Albums of 2023, at #15.

In 2024, he co-released Chrome Valley with poet Mahogany L. Browne, a project that blended jazz with spoken word. That same year, he co-released My Ideal with vocalist Catherine Russell on Dot Time Records. The duo album received a Grammy Award nomination for Best Jazz Vocal Album at the 67th Annual Grammy Awards. My Ideal also won a 2025 Bistro Award for "Outstanding Recording." Later that same year Mason released, A Breath of Fresh Air, which received a fair amount of radio airplay and favorable reviews. It was included in Goldmine's "Best of the Best" jazz releases of 2025.

== Awards ==
Year	Nominated work	Category	Award	Result
2025	My Ideal	Outstanding Recording	Bistro Award	Won
2024	My Ideal	Best Jazz Vocal Album	Grammy Award	Nominated
2023	The Jazz Continuum	Outstanding Sound Design and Music Composition	Bessie Award	Won

== Discography ==
=== As leader ===
Year	Album	Artist	Label
2023	The Southern Suite	Sean Mason	Blue Engine Records
2025	A Breath of Fresh Air	Sean Mason	Taylor Christian Records
2026	State of the Art	Sean Mason	Taylor Christian Records

=== As co-leader ===
Year	Album	Artist	Label
2024	My Ideal	Catherine Russell and Sean Mason	Dot Time Records
2024	Chrome Valley	Mahogany L. Browne and Sean Mason	The Soapbox Presents
