= Catherine Russell (singer) =

American jazz and blues vocalist (born 1956)

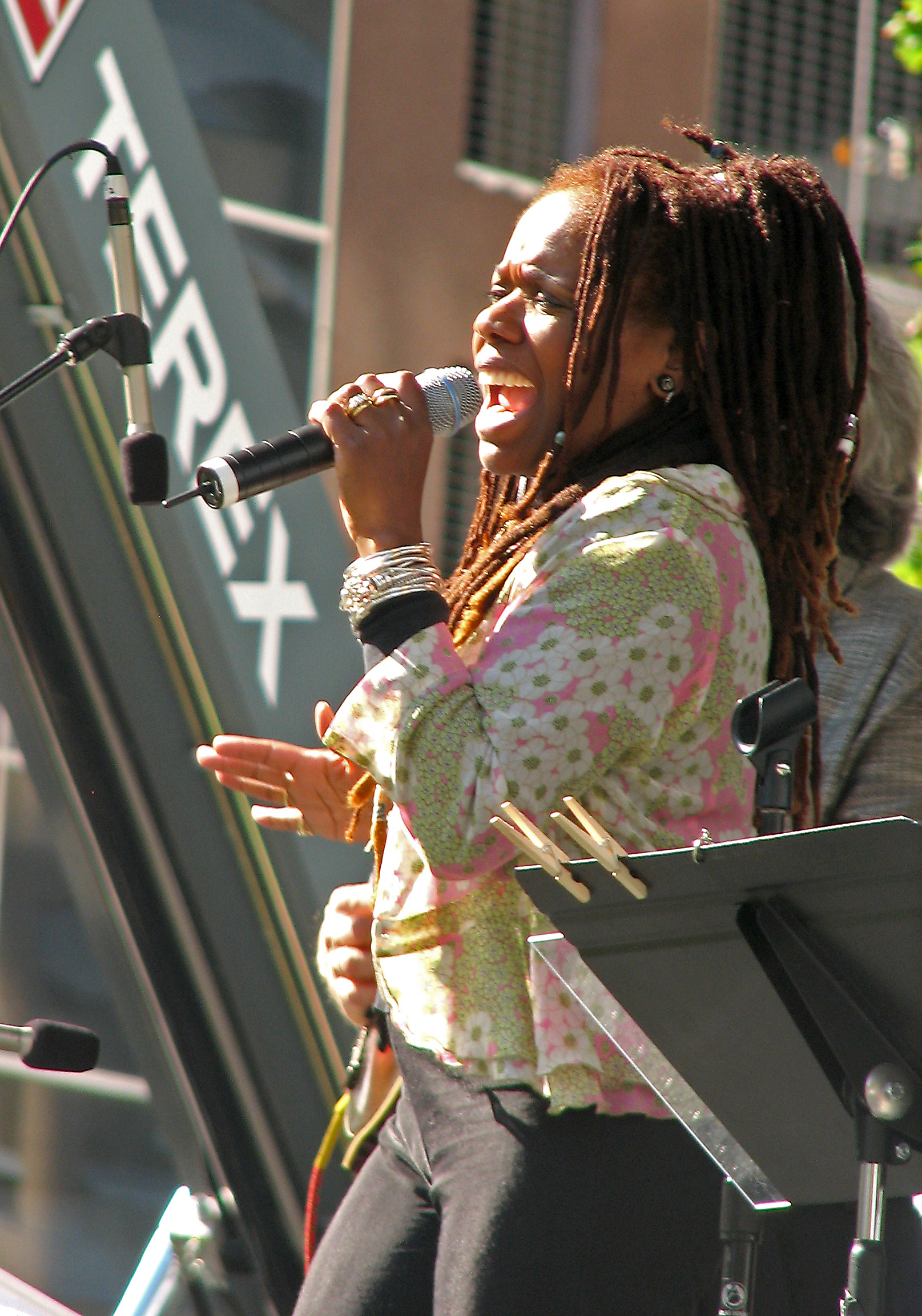
- Russell at the Detroit Jazz Festival, 2006

Background information
- Also known as: Cat
- Born: September 20, 1956 (age 70); New York City, U.S.
- Genres: Jazz; blues; rock
- Occupation: Singer
- Instruments: Vocals; keyboards; guitar; percussion; mandolin
- Years active: 2006–present
- Labels: Harmonia Mundi; Dot Time Records
- Website: www.catherinerussell.net

Catherine Russell (born 1956) is an American jazz and blues singer. She is best known for her 2016 album Harlem on My Mind and for touring with David Bowie and Steely Dan.

== Life and career ==
=== Early life ===
Her father was Luis Russell, a Panamanian-born "pianist and leader of one of the most impressive big bands on the early New York jazz scene after leading a group in New Orleans and moving to Chicago, where he worked with King Oliver, who gave Louis Armstrong his first big break." He later became Louis Armstrong's long-time musical director. Her mother, Carline Ray, held degrees from both Juilliard and the Manhattan School of Music and performed with the International Sweethearts of Rhythm following World War II. She later performed "with Doc Cheatham and Wynton Marsalis, among others."

Russell's interest in music began as a child. As a young girl, she was "steeped in early jazz—from '20s and '30s recordings by her father's orchestras to '40s and '50s R&B." She was also enamored with country music—including the early George Jones, Patsy Cline, Hank Williams, and Merle Haggard—as she liked "anything that swings."

=== Background vocalist ===
In the mid-1980s, she often visited a Manhattan club where guitarist Jimmy Vivino was the bandleader. One evening she was invited to sing on stage with musician Donald Fagen of the band Steely Dan. Soon afterwards, Russell was invited to tour with Fagen's "New York Rock and Soul Revue" in 1992. When Steely Dan reunited in 1993, Fagen invited her to join them, and she toured with them until 1996. She spent "many years on the road with rock, blues, jazz, soul and gospel bands." She preferred to tour with acoustic string bands so that she did not have to compete with electric guitars. She performed background vocals on the 1990 Madonna recording "Rescue Me".

From 2002 until 2004, Russell worked with David Bowie as a band member, providing backing vocals and featured contributions on guitar, keyboard and percussion for Bowie's Heathen Tour, A Reality Tour, and his late-2003 album Reality. Recalling these experiences, Russell remarked: "Working with David was a dream come true. I'd been a fan since 1971. He was such a gracious man, and musically generous. He brought out the best in me. In addition to background singing, he let me play several instruments: keyboards, percussion, guitar and mandolin. He allowed me to stretch beyond what I thought I was capable of. He was caring, funny and loved his family. I am blessed to have known him."

=== Jazz career ===
When Bowie's touring career was suspended in 2004, Russell's business partner and later husband Paul Kahn suggested that she record a solo album. However, Russell initially rejected the idea as she believed she already had "a nice career as a backup singer." Nevertheless, she eventually consented to record song tracks at a friend's studio in Skokie, Illinois. Kahn then invited executives from a record company to hear Russell sing in New York, which led to a recording contract with Harmonia Mundi. The earlier tracks recorded in Illinois became her first album, Cat (2006).

Russell soon experienced a "mid-career surge" in which she transitioned from an "in-demand, first-call backup singer to rock and pop stars" to become "the foremost vocal interpreter of vintage jazz and R&B songs." Seven albums followed, about one every two years, supported by an extensive touring schedule in Asia, Australia, Europe and the United States. With her roots in jazz and the blues, Russell quickly became known in jazz circles and, by January 2014, was the second best-selling female artist on several jazz charts.

"Harlem on My Mind"
Sample of the 1933 song "Harlem on My Mind" as covered by Russell. The song first appeared in the musical revue As Thousands Cheer.

Her voice has been described as "reminiscent of many of the great jazz and blues singers. Her phrasing is impeccable and her delivery relaxed and effortless; it never seems as if she's 'trying.'" The New York Times stated that her performances project "a strength, good humor and intelligence that engulf the room in a mood of bonhomie." Her rendition of Irving Berlin's tune "Harlem on My Mind" was highly praised by the Jazz Times which declared that, "if there's a post-millennial answer to Dinah Washington, surely it's Catherine Russell: same remarkable vocal dexterity-blues shouter meets jazz stylist; same espresso-strength power; same immaculate clarity; same ability to shift seamlessly from sassy to torchy."

Russell's cover of the 1920s song "Crazy Blues" was used in "The Emerald City" episode of the HBO drama Boardwalk Empire. This song was included on a soundtrack recording that won in 2012 for Grammy Award for Best Compilation Soundtrack for Visual Media at the 54th Grammy Awards.

In 2019, Russell appeared as a character in the biographical feature film Bolden!, about early jazz performer Buddy Bolden. She performed the blues folk song "Make Me a Pallet on the Floor." The same year, she released her seventh album, Alone Together, via Dot Time Records.

In 2022, Catherine Russell released Send For Me, her eighth album as a leader, receiving rave reviews in national media outlets; The Wall Street Journal, Relix, No Depression, Pop Matters, JazzTimes, and others, while also performing a Tiny Desk (Home) Concert for NPR Music.

In 2024, Russell released My Ideal, a collaborative album with Sean Mason.

== Awards ==
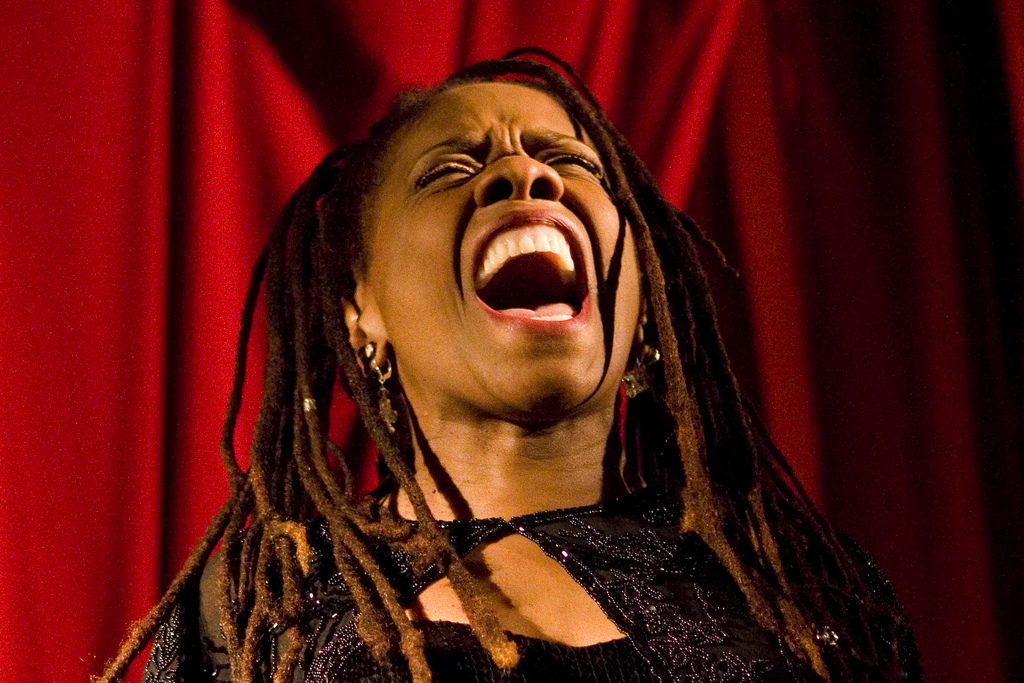
Russell in a 2009 performance

- German Record Critics' Award — Sentimental Streak (2008)
- Prix Decouverte from Hot Club de France — Sentimental Streak (2008)
- Grammy Award — Best Compilation Soundtrack — Visual Media, Boardwalk Empire Vol. 1 (2011)
- Prix du Vocal Jazz from L'Academie du Jazz — Strictly Romancin' (2012)
- Grand Prix from Hot Club de France — Strictly Romancin' (2012)
- NYC Nightlife Award — Outstanding Jazz Performer (2012)
- Bistro Award for Outstanding Achievement, Recording — Strictly Romancin' (2013)
- Fans Decision Jazz Award — Hot House Magazine & Metropolitan Room — Female Vocalist (2016)
- The Louie from The Louis Armstrong House Museum — Preserving and Promoting the Legacy of Louis Armstrong (2016)
- Grammy Nomination — Best Jazz Vocal Album — Harlem on My Mind (2017)
- Grammy Nomination — Best Jazz Vocal Album — Alone Together (2019)
- Grammy Nomination — Best Jazz Vocal Album — My Ideal (2024)
- Bistro Award Catherine Russell & Sean Mason for Outstanding Recording 2025 - My Ideal
- 2025 Harvard Jazz Master In Residence
- Grammy Nomination — Best Jazz Vocal Album — Live at Jazz at Lincoln Center (2026)

== Discography ==
=== Albums ===
- Cat (2006)
- Sentimental Streak (2008)
- Inside This Heart of Mine (2010)
- Strictly Romancin' (2012)
- Bring It Back (2014)
- Harlem on My Mind (2016)
- Alone Together (2019)
- Send for Me (2022)
- Live @ Jazz At Lincoln Center (2026)

=== Collaborative albums ===
- My Ideal (2024) (with Sean Mason)
- Cat & The Hounds (2025) (with Colin Hancock's Jazz Hounds)

=== Soundtracks and compilations as featured artist ===
- The New Jazz Divas: NPR Discover Songs (2010)
- Walkin' & Swingin' (2011)
- Boardwalk Empire, Vol. 1 (2011)
- Kill Your Darlings (Original Soundtrack) (2013)
- Bolden (Original Soundtrack) – Wynton Marsalis (2019)
- Big Band Holidays II – Jazz at Lincoln Center Orchestra with Wynton Marsalis (2019)
- Big Band Holidays III – Jazz at Lincoln Center Orchestra with Wynton Marsalis (2023)

=== As backing singer, musician or guest lead singer ===
Some of Russell's credits are as follows:

- 1990: The Immaculate Collection – Madonna (Background Vocals)
- 1993: The Wheel – Rosanne Cash (Background Vocals)
- 1993: The Rainy Season – Marc Cohn (Background Vocals)
- 1993: Kamakiriad – Donald Fagen (Background Vocals)
- 1995: Twelve Deadly Cyns...and Then Some – Cyndi Lauper (Background Vocals)
- 1995: Retrospective – Rosanne Cash (Background Vocals)
- 1995: Relish – Joan Osborne (Background Vocals)
- 1995: Alive in America – Steely Dan (Percussion, Background Vocals, Human Whistle)
- 1997: Sisters of Avalon – Cyndi Lauper (Composer, Mandolin, Background Vocals)
- 1997: Child: Music for the Christmas Season – Jane Siberry – (Vocals)
- 1998: I'm Still Here... Damn It! – Sandra Bernhard (Background Vocals)
- 1998: Gloria! – Gloria Estefan (Background Vocals)
- 1998: Burning the Daze – Marc Cohn (Background Vocals)
- 1999: Here Comes The Bride – Spin Doctors (Background Vocals)
- 1999: A Crash Course in Roses – Catie Curtis (Gut String Guitar)
- 2000: Live at Shanghai Jazz – Earl May Quintet Introducing Catherine Russell (Lead Vocals)
- 2001: Speaking In Tongues - The Holmes Brothers (Background Vocals, Mandolin)
- 2002: Sleepless – Peter Wolf (Background Vocals)
- 2002: Heathen Tour – David Bowie (Background Vocals, Keyboards, Percussion)
- 2003: Rules of Travel – Rosanne Cash (Background Vocals)
- 2003: Reality – David Bowie (Background Vocals)
- 2003: Everything Must Go – Steely Dan (Background Vocals)
- 2004: A Reality Tour – David Bowie (Background Vocals, Mandolin, Percussion, Guitar, Keyboards)
- 2005: Black Yankee Rock – Chocolate Genius (Background Vocals)
- 2006: Black Cadillac – Rosanne Cash (Background Vocals)
- 2007: I Love You – Diana Ross (Background Vocals)
- 2008: The Orchard – Lizz Wright (Background Vocals)
- 2009: Electric Dirt – Levon Helm (Vocals)
- 2010: Midnight Souvenirs – Peter Wolf (Background Vocals)
- 2010: Feed My Soul – The Holmes Brothers (Background Vocals, Cowbell, Mandolin)
- 2011: Matthew Morrison – Matthew Morrison (Choir, Chorus)
- 2011: Cicada – Hazmat Modine (Background Vocals)
- 2012: Sunken Condos – Donald Fagen (Background Vocals)
- 2013: 13 Live – Jimmy Vivino & The Black Italians (Lead Vocals, Background Vocals)
- 2013: Vocal Sides – Carline Ray (Producer, Vocals, Liner Notes)
- 2014: The River & the Thread – Rosanne Cash (Background Vocals)
- 2014: Tales from the Realm of the Queen of Pentacles – Suzanne Vega (Background Vocals)
- 2014: Great Big World – Tony Trischka (Vocals)
- 2015: Soul Time! – Southside Johnny and the Asbury Jukes (Background Vocals)
- 2015: Didn't It Rain - Amy Helm (Background Vocals)
- 2015: This Is Where I Live – William Bell (Background Vocals)
- 2016: A Cure for Loneliness – Peter Wolf (Background Vocals)
- 2017: Duke And His Dames of Rhythm – Duke Robillard (Featured Vocalist)
- 2017: Long List of Priors – Kenny White (Background Vocals)
- 2020: Trouble and Strife – Joan Osborne (Background Vocals)
- 2020: World On The Ground – Sarah Jarosz (Harmony Vocals)
- 2020: Shall We Hope – Tony Trischka (Lead Vocalist)
- 2021: The Nightfly Live – Donald Fagen, Steely Dan (Vocals, Percussion)
- 2021: Northeast Corridor – Steely Dan Live (Vocals, Percussion)
- 2022: Good Time Music – Steven Bernstein's MTO & Catherine Russell (Lead Vocalist)
- 2023: Nobody Owns You – Joan Osborne (Background Vocals)
- 2024: Silver City – Amy Helm (Background Vocals)
- 2025: Flying With Angels – Suzanne Vega (Background Vocals)
- 2025: Cat & The Hounds – Colin Hancock's Jazz Hounds Featuring Catherine Russell (Lead Vocalist)
- 2026: Days - The Mountain Goats (Harmony Vocals)
