= A Breath of Fresh Air =

A Breath of Fresh Air may refer to:

- Picnic – A Breath of Fresh Air, a sampler issued by the Harvest Records label
- A Breath of Fresh Air (film), a 2022 Italian comedy-drama film
- A Breath of Fresh Air (album), a 2025 jazz album by Sean Mason
