= Up to No Good (disambiguation) =

Up to No Good is a 1990 album by Peter Wolf.

Up to No Good may also refer to:

- "Up to No Good" (Staged), a 2020 television episode
- "Up to No Good", a 2009 song by Rancid from the album Let the Dominoes Fall
- Up to No Good, a 2012 album by Nigel Dupree Band
- "Up to No Good", a 2015 song by The Hoosiers from the album The Secret Service
