= Sleepless (Peter Wolf album) =

Studio album by Peter Wolf
- Released: September 10, 2002
- Studio: Sear Sound, Avatar, and Red House (New York, NY); Woolly Mammoth Sound (Boston, MA).
- Genre: Rock, blues
- Length: 40:36
- Label: Artemis
- Producer: Peter Wolf, Kenny White

Peter Wolf chronology
Fool's Parade (1998)	Sleepless (2002)	Midnight Souvenirs (2010)

Professional ratings
Review scores
Source	Rating
AllMusic	link
Rolling Stone	link

Sleepless is the sixth solo album by Peter Wolf, released in 2002. The album ranked 427 on Rolling Stone's "The 500 Greatest Albums of All Time".

Wolf told The Boston Phoenix in 2002 that he had a "pessimistic sensibility" in his approach to making the album with no great expectations about the album's commercial viability after watching his previous record "die on the vine" due to his then label (along with several others) being "swallowed up in (a) big corporate conglomerate". He explained that he "made this record figuring, ‘I have a lot of different interests, a lot of different roots, and this is the painting I feel like painting right now.’ And what's the single? There is no single. I wasn't thinking of hooks."

The album features notable guest appearances by Mick Jagger, Keith Richards, Wolf's former J. Geils bandmate, Magic Dick, and Steve Earle.

Upon release, Sleepless received positive reviews. In addition to Rolling Stone ranking 'Sleepless' at #427 on their Top 500 Greatest Albums of All Time List, 'No Depression' wrote "With Sleepless, Wolf seems back in charge at last, turning in the rootsiest -- and easily the best -- of his solo works.". In their review, 'Pop Matters' stated: "Peter Wolf has released 'Sleepless', his sixth solo album, which shows just how far he has matured as a music artist. You don’t want to miss this one. Comfortably taking pages from Dylan’s recent tour de force 'Love and Theft', the Rolling Stones’ canon circa ’68-71, and those timeless Stax singles, Wolf delivers a masterful fusion of blues, country and soul.”

== Track listing ==
1. "Growin' Pain" (Angelo Petraglia, Wolf) – 3:12
2. "Nothin' but the Wheel" (John Scott Sherrill) – 4:34
3. "A Lot of Good Ones Gone" (Will Jennings, Wolf) – 3:33
4. "Never Like This Before" (Isaac Hayes, Booker T. Jones, David Porter) – 3:21
5. "Run Silent, Run Deep" (Timothy S. Mayer, Wolf) – 4:13
6. "Homework" (Dave Clark, Al Perkins, Otis Rush) – 2:39
7. "Five O'Clock Angel" (Jennings, Wolf) – 3:00
8. "Hey Jordan" (Jennings, Wolf) – 3:03
9. "Too Close Together" (Sonny Boy Williamson) – 2:24
10. "Some Things You Don't Want to Know" (Jennings, Wolf) – 2:31
11. "Oh Marianne" (Jennings, Wolf) – 4:19
12. "Sleepless" (Jennings, Wolf) – 4:05

== Personnel ==
- Peter Wolf – vocals
- Kenny White – organ (1, 3, 4, 6, 7, 11, 12), backing vocals (1, 4, 5), acoustic piano (2, 5, 7, 9, 11, 12), acoustic guitar (2, 10, 12), Wurlitzer electric piano (5, 8, 10)
- Brian Mitchell – accordion (11)
- Larry Campbell – guitars (1, 2, 3), mandolin (1, 10), fiddle (1, 2, 5, 6, 10), backing vocals (1), pedal steel guitar (2, 5, 12), resonator guitar (4, 6), acoustic guitar (12)
- Duke Levine – guitar solo (1), mandolin (2, 6), electric guitar (7, 10, 12), baritone guitar (12)
- Angelo Petraglia – acoustic guitar (1, 4, 10)
- Cornell Dupree – guitar solo (4), guitars (12)
- Stuart Kimball – electric guitar (4, 10)
- Keith Richards – electric guitar (9), vocals (9)
- Tony Garnier – acoustic bass (1, 2, 4, 5, 6, 10, 12)
- Warren McRae – electric bass (3, 7)
- John Conte – electric bass (8, 11)
- Paul Ossola – acoustic bass (9)
- Shawn Pelton – drums (1, 2, 4, 5, 6, 8–12), drum loop (12)
- Kevin Shurtleff – additional drums (1), percussion (3)
- Charley Drayton – drums (3, 7)
- Dan Reiser – drums (11)
- Sammy Merendino – additional percussion (12)
- Mick Jagger – harmonica (2), vocals (2)
- Magic Dick – harmonica (9)
- Crispin Cioe – alto saxophone (12)
- Arno Hecht – tenor saxophone (12)
- Bob Funk – tenor trombone (12)
- Larry Etkin – trumpet (12)
- Rob Eaton – backing vocals (1)
- Teresa Williams – backing vocals (2, 10)
- Ada Dyer – backing vocals (3, 4, 5, 7, 8, 11, 12)
- Cire Jones – backing vocals (3, 11)
- Catherine Russell – backing vocals (3–8, 11, 12)
- Steve Earle – vocals (10)
- Milt Grayson – bass vocals (11)
- Fred Griffith – backing vocals (11)

=== Production ===
- Peter Wolf – producer
- Kenny White – producer
- Rob Eaton – recording (1, 2, 4, 5, 6, 9, 10, 12), mixing (1, 5, 6, 12)
- Ben Wisch – mixing (2, 3, 7, 8, 11), recording (3, 7, 8, 11)
- Phil Greene – mixing (4, 9, 10)
- Dave Westner – additional engineer (1), mixing (4, 12)
- Chris Rival – additional engineer (12)
- Tom Waltz – additional engineer (12)
- John Weston – additional engineer (12)
- Steve Mazur – assistant engineer
- Jacques Obadia – assistant engineer
- Bob Ludwig – mastering at Gateway Mastering (Portland, Maine)
- Karen Rome – project coordinator
- Jill Dell'Abate – session coordinator
- Frank Olinsky – design, cover photography
- Joe Greene – photography
