= The Sure Thing =

1985 American adventure comedy romance film by Rob Reiner

- Theatrical release poster
- Directed by: Rob Reiner
- Written by: Steven L. Bloom; Jonathan Roberts
- Produced by: Henry Winkler; Andrew Scheinman; Roger Birnbaum
- Starring: John Cusack; Daphne Zuniga; Viveca Lindfors; Nicollette Sheridan
- Cinematography: Robert Elswit
- Edited by: Robert Leighton
- Music by: Tom Scott
- Production company: Monument Pictures
- Distributed by: Embassy Films Associates
- Release date: March 1, 1985
- Running time: 95 minutes
- Country: United States
- Language: English
- Budget: $4.5 million
- Box office: $18.1 million

The Sure Thing is a 1985 American romantic comedy road film directed by Rob Reiner and starring John Cusack, Daphne Zuniga, Viveca Lindfors, and Nicollette Sheridan. The film chronicles the cross-country journey of college students Walter Gibson (Cusack) and Alison Bradbury (Zuniga) as they make their way from New England to Los Angeles over Christmas break, each in an effort to meet their ideal romantic match.

Written by Steven L. Bloom and Jonathan Roberts, The Sure Thing marked Reiner's second directorial feature after This Is Spinal Tap (1984), and Cusack's first major starring role.

Released theatrically in the spring of 1985, The Sure Thing was a box-office success and received mostly favorable reviews from film critics, who commended it for its traditional comedic structure, with some likening it to a modern version of Frank Capra's It Happened One Night (1934), though Reiner himself stated that the parallels between the two films were unintentional.

In 2017, the British Film Institute ranked The Sure Thing among Reiner's top five feature films.

== Plot ==
High school senior Walter "Gib" Gibson and best friend Lance celebrate moving on to college, though Gib mostly laments having lost his touch with girls. Lance heads to UCLA while Gib attends an Ivy League college in New England. The two friends regularly communicate with Gib saying his luck with girls is unchanged. Gib attempts to woo the ambitious, regimented Alison Bradbury, his English classmate by tricking her into tutoring him. His clumsy seduction angers her.

Lance invites Gib to come to California for Christmas break, saying he can set him up with a beautiful girl, claiming she is a "sure thing" with no strings attached. Gib arranges a cross-country ride share with Gary and Mary Ann only to discover that Alison is also a passenger. She is headed to UCLA to visit her boyfriend, Jason. The tension and bickering between Gib and Alison become too much for Gary and Mary Ann, and they abandon the two roadside in the middle of nowhere, infuriating Alison.

Alison hitches a ride from a middle-aged man driving a pick-up truck. When he attempts to sexually assault her, Gib, who hid in the truck bed, quickly intervenes. The two decide to stick together, eventually making it to a bus station. However, Gib lacks enough money for the fare, so the two instead check into a motel. While Alison is talking to Jason on the phone, Gib leaves and ventures to a nearby bar. He spends his remaining cash on drinks and drunkenly sings Christmas carols with the locals.

The next morning, Gib has Allison stuff her shirt with scarves to appear pregnant, hoping it increases their chances of getting a ride. The two hitchhike to a restaurant, whereupon Alison realizes she left her appointment book and cash back at the motel. That night, the two are caught outside in a rainstorm, until Alison suddenly remembers she has her father's emergency credit card. The two stay at an upscale hotel, where they treat themselves to drinks and dinner. The next morning, Alison is pleased to find Gib embracing her, but he quickly pulls away upon waking up.

While hitchhiking with a truck driver through Arizona, Alison overhears Gib saying that he is on his way to meet a "sure thing". Upon arriving at the UCLA campus, Alison angrily parts ways with Gib. That night, Gib attends a Christmas mixer where Lance introduces Gib to the "sure thing" girl. Meanwhile, Alison is bored staying in Jason's dormitory and drags him to the same party. Alison and Gib see each other, but their mutual jealousy leads to a confrontation. Gib takes the "sure thing" to Lance's room but he can only think about Alison. In Jason's dormitory, Alison tells him about Gib. He asks if she loves Gib and it is implied that she does.

Back on campus after Christmas break, Gib tries making amends with Alison, but she ignores him, angry about the party and believing Gib slept with the “sure thing.” In English class, Professor Taub reads Gib's essay, which describes his night with the "sure thing". The girl in the essay asks the protagonist if he loves her, but for the first time he realizes that those are not just words, and he cannot sleep with her. Alison realizes what actually happened that night and tells Gib that she and Jason broke up. The two reconcile and kiss.

== Cast ==
- John Cusack as Walter "Gib" Gibson
- Daphne Zuniga as Alison Bradbury
- Nicollette Sheridan as "The Sure Thing"
- Viveca Lindfors as Professor Taub
- Anthony Edwards as Lance
- Boyd Gaines as Jason
- Tim Robbins as Gary Cooper
- Lisa Jane Persky as Mary Ann Webster
- Carmen Filpi as Bus Station Bum
- Fran Ryan as Lady in Car
- Richard Hamilton as Bartender
- Larry Hankin as Trucker
- Sarah Buxton as Sharon
- Robert Bauer as Moke

== Production ==
=== Development ===
The origins of the film came from an experience writer Steven L. Bloom had while attending Brown University. During this time, his best friend was attending Emory University in Atlanta, Georgia and was constantly recounting the good times he was having, which Bloom felt left out of. Out of pity over his situation his friend arranged for him to meet a sure thing over spring break, so Bloom found a ride through a ride board and drove to Atlanta with a number of other students.

=== Casting ===
When casting for the part of Walter "Gib" Gibson began, director Rob Reiner initially refused to meet with John Cusack because the actor was under-aged. Casting directors Jane Jenkins and Janet Hirshenson convinced Reiner to audition Cusack, after which Reiner knew he had to have him for the part. At the time Anthony Edwards was seriously being considered for the lead, but after Cusack got the part, Edwards was offered the best friend role instead.

At the time of his casting, Cusack was still 17 and had not yet graduated from high school, so producer Roger Birnbaum had to go to court to have him emancipated. During the filming of the movie (March–April 1984), Birnbaum then became Cusack's legal guardian.

Reiner cast Daphne Zuniga in the role of Alison Bradbury; she commented in a 2025 interview that he was inspired to cast in her in the part because she "reminded him of someone he was in love with or had a crush on in college."

Robert Bauer played the same character, Moke, in two of Reiner's films: This Is Spinal Tap (1984) and this one.

=== Filming ===
Principal photography began in early March 1984 in Stockton and Los Angeles, California. Due to the fact that the winter of 1984 was uncharacteristically warm, the filmmakers struggled to locate snowy settings on the east coast for the sequences set there. Several days before shooting was scheduled to begin at the University of the Pacific in Stockton, a blizzard hit upstate New York, and a second unit was sent to Ithaca to capture the snowy locale. Meanwhile, the exteriors at the University of the Pacific—which was used as a stand-in for the east coast college campus—were sprayed with a fire-retardant foam to appear as though snow had fallen there. Additional photography took place at a beachside residence near Malibu.

== Soundtrack ==
Many popular songs were used in the film but a soundtrack was never officially released. The following is a list of tracks featured in the film:

No.	Title	Artist	Length
1.	"Infatuation"	Rod Stewart
2.	"The Heart of Rock & Roll"	Huey Lewis and the News
3.	"Two Sides of Love"	Sammy Hagar
4.	"Party All Night"	Quiet Riot
5.	"Tears"	John Waite
6.	"Concealed Weapons"	J. Geils Band
7.	"The Age of Aquarius"	The Fifth Dimension
8.	"Button Up Your Overcoat"	Ruth Etting
9.	"Feelings"	Morris Albert
10.	"Heartache Tonight"	The Eagles
11.	"The Fast One"	JD Souther
12.	"The Christmas Song"	Mel Tormé and Robert Wells
13.	"You Might Think"	The Cars
14.	"Dance Hall Days"	Wang Chung
15.	"Penny Lover"	Lionel Richie
16.	"Lights Out"	Peter Wolf
17.	"Just Because"	Ray Charles

== Release ==
Embassy Films Associates originally planned to release The Sure Thing on December 7, 1984, coinciding with the Christmas and holiday season, though this release date was ultimately pushed back. The film was given advanced sneak previews in the United States and Canada on February 23, 1985 before receiving a wide theatrical release on March 1, 1985.

=== Home media ===
MGM Home Entertainment released The Sure Thing in a special edition region 1 DVD on August 5, 2003. In 2015, Shout! Factory released a 30th-anniversary Blu-ray edition of the film. Sandpiper Pictures reissued a Blu-ray edition on December 19, 2023.

== Reception ==
=== Box office ===
It earned over $18 million at the box office.

=== Critical response ===
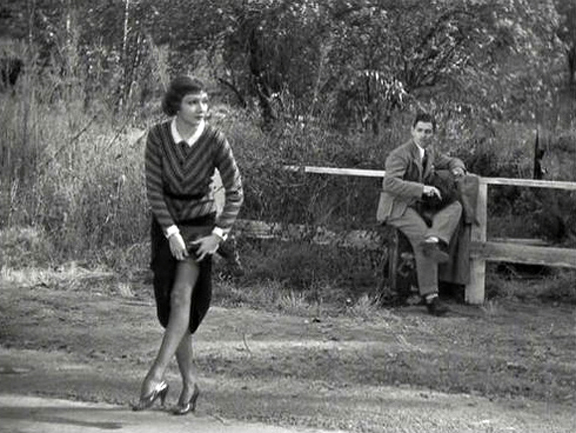
Numerous critics compared the film to Frank Capra's It Happened One Night (1934), with some even describing it as an unofficial remake

Reviews for The Sure Thing were mostly positive, with many praising its traditional storytelling in a modernized context. (Note: Attributed to multiple critical sources.) Film critic Roger Ebert, who gave it three-and-a-half stars out of four, praised the film and called it a "small miracle" for its handling of teenage material with realism and sensitivity in an era when movies like the crass comedy Porky's were the norm. In a review for The New York Times, Janet Maslin wrote that The Sure Thing was "glowing proof of two things: Traditional romantic comedy can be adapted to suit the teen-age trade, and Mr. Reiner's contribution to This Is Spinal Tap was more than a matter of humor". Variety deemed the film "a sweetly old-fashioned look at the last lap of the coming-of-age ordeal in which the sure thing becomes less important than the real thing. Realization may not be earth shattering, but in an era of fast food and faster sex, return to the traditional is downright refreshing."

Numerous critics likened the film to Frank Capra's It Happened One Night (1934), with some even describing it as a remake. Despite these comparisons, Reiner stated that the parallels between the films were unintentional. Time Out likened the film to a "confident, witty teenage variation of It Happened One Night [that] focuses on two students hitching across the States through rainstorms, starvation and show tunes. He's a libidinous layabout who inadvertently dropped in to college. She's an uptight goody-goody who believes spontaneity has its time and its place. There's plenty of mileage in this pairing, even if the movie isn't going anywhere unexpected." Ted Mahar of The Oregonian similarly compared the film's plot and structure to the Capra film, and praised Cusack and Zuniga's onscreen chemistry. Critic Linda Deutsch also made the same comparison, adding that the film "proves that a classic movie formula can be updated to 1985 tastes and still work... The youth appeal is evident in The Sure Thing, but adult audiences may also be charmed by this old-fashioned love story in a new-fashioned setting." On review aggregator website Rotten Tomatoes, the film holds an approval rating of 84% based on 99 reviews, with an average rating of 7.0/10.

=== Legacy ===
In 2017, the British Film Institute ranked The Sure Thing among Reiner's five most essential directorial efforts, noting: "In an age when American teen comedies came to be defined by the success of Porky's (1982), The Sure Thing triumphs from its winning formula of being sassy yet never bawdy and sentimental while never mawkish." In the book Contemporary North American Film Directors (2002), the film is noted as "presag[ing] the comedic flair of [Reiner's] later film, When Harry Met Sally...."

The film holds a rating of 81% on Rotten Tomatoes based on 113 reviews. The website's critical consensus reads: "Though its final outcome is predictable, The Sure Thing is a charming, smartly written, and mature teen comedy featuring a breakout role for John Cusack."

== Sources ==
- Cullen, Del; Patterson, Hannah; Allon, Yoram, eds. (2002). Contemporary North American Film Directors. New York City, New York: Wallflower Press. ISBN 978-1-903-36452-9.
- Duralde, Alonso (2010). Have Yourself a Movie Little Christmas. Lanham, Maryland: Limelight Editions. ISBN 978-0-879-10376-7.
