= Lights Out (Peter Wolf album) =

Studio album by Peter Wolf
- Released: July 1984
- Studio: Syncro Sound, Boston, Massachusetts
- Genre: Rock, blues rock, dance-rock, electro, pop rock
- Length: 41:10
- Label: EMI America
- Producer: Peter Wolf, Michael Jonzun

Peter Wolf chronology
Lights Out (1984)	Come As You Are (1987)

Professional ratings
Review scores
Source	Rating
AllMusic	4.5/5 stars

Lights Out is the debut solo album by American musician Peter Wolf, released in 1984. The album was dedicated "to the memory of Edith Marie Hasselman and Edward Mant Hood".

== Track listing ==
1. "Lights Out" (Don Covay, Wolf) – 4:27
2. "I Need You Tonight" (Peter Bliss, Wolf) – 3:39
3. "Oo-Ee-Diddley-Bop!" (Michael Jonzun, Wolf, Gordon Worthy) – 4:13
4. "Gloomy Sunday" (László Jávor, Sam M. Lewis, Rezső Seress) – 3:37
5. "Baby Please Don't Let Me Go" (Michael Jonzun, Maurice Starr, Wolf) – 4:02
6. "Crazy" (Michael Jonzun, Wolf) – 3:49
7. "Poor Girl's Heart" (Michael Jonzun, Wolf) – 3:04
8. "Here Comes That Hurt" (Michael Jonzun, Wolf) – 3:14
9. "Pretty Lady" (Michael Jonzun, Wolf) – 3:44
10. "Mars Needs Women" (Michael Jonzun, Wolf) – 2:41
11. "Billy Bigtime" (Michael Jonzun, Tim Mayer, Wolf) – 4:40

== Personnel ==
- Peter Wolf – congas, vocals, backing vocals
- Robin Beck – backing vocals on "Lights Out"
- Adrian Belew – guitar
- Peter Bliss – guitar, backing vocals
- Tony "Rocks" Cowan – guitar
- Alan Dawson – percussion
- Elliot Easton – guitar
- Eddie Gorodetsky – narrator on "Mars Needs Women"
- Yogi Horton – percussion
- Mick Jagger – backing vocals on "Pretty Lady"
- Michael Jonzun – bass, flute, guitar, percussion, congas, horn, keyboards, backing vocals
- Will Lee – bass, vocals, backing vocals
- Leon Mobley – conductor, congas
- P-Funk Horns – horn section
- Rick "Rice" Peppers – guitar
- Elliott Randall – guitar
- Randy Roos – guitar
- G. E. Smith – guitar on "Pretty Lady"
- Maurice Starr – bass, guitar, backing vocals
- Ed Stasium – guitar, percussion
- Rusty "The Toe-Jammer" Pendleton – scratches on "Oo-Ee-Diddley-Bop"
- Skeeter Singletary – scratches on "Oo-Ee-Diddley-Bop"
- Gordon Worthy – bass, conga, keyboard, backing vocals

Technical personnel

- Producers: Peter Wolf, Michael Jonzun
- Engineer: Ed Stasium
- Mixing assistant: Billy Miranda
- Studio assistants: Sidney Burton, Calvin Johnson, Tom Moore
- Assistant: Gordon Worthy
- Arrangers: Peter Wolf, Michael Jonzun
- Art direction: Carin Goldberg, Henry Marquez
- Design: Carin Goldberg, Henry Marquez
- Logo design: Michael Diehl
- Photography: Carol Friedman, Ron Pownall
- Cover photo: Chris Callis

== Charts ==
Chart performance for Light's Out
Chart	Peak
Australia (Kent Music Report)	94
US Billboard 200	24
