= Alone Together (Catherine Russell album) =

Studio album by Catherine Russell
- Released: March 1, 2019
- Recorded: August 20–22, 2018
- Studio: Sear Sound, New York City
- Genre: Jazz
- Label: Dot Time Records
- Producer: Catherine Russell, Katherine Miller, Paul Kahn

Catherine Russell chronology
Harlem on My Mind (2016)	Alone Together (2019)

Alone Together is a studio album by Catherine Russell. It received a Grammy Award nomination for Best Jazz Vocal Album.

== Track listing ==
1. "Alone Together"
2. "Early in the Morning"
3. "You Turned the Tables On Me"
4. "He May Be Your Dog But He's Wearing My Collar"
5. "Shake Down the Stars"
6. "Is You Is Or Is You Ain't My Baby?"
7. "You Can't Pull the Wool Over My Eyes"
8. "I Only Have Eyes for You"
9. "When Did You Leave Heaven?"
10. "You're Not the Only Oyster in the Show"

CD bonus tracks

1. "Errand Girl for Rhythm"
2. "How Deep Is the Ocean?"
3. "I Wonder"
