= Harlem on My Mind =

2016 studio album by jazz singer Catherine Russell

Studio album by Catherine Russell
- Released: September 9, 2016
- Studio: MSR Studios, New York, NY
- Genre: Jazz
- Length: 50:02
- Label: Jazz Village JV579004
- Producer: Catherine Russell, Katherine Miller, Paul Kahn

Catherine Russell chronology
| Bring It Back (2014) | Harlem on My Mind (2016) | Alone Together (2019) |

Professional ratings
Review scores
| Source | Rating |
|---|---|
| All About Jazz | 3.5/5 stars |

Harlem on My Mind is a studio album by American jazz singer Catherine Russell, released on September 9, 2016. It earned Russell a Grammy Award nomination for Best Jazz Vocal Album.

== Reception ==
"Harlem on My Mind"
Sample of the 1933 song "Harlem on My Mind" as covered by Russell. The song first appeared in the musical revue As Thousands Cheer.

Christopher Loudon of JazzTimes stated

If there’s a postmillennial answer to Dinah Washington, surely it’s Catherine Russell: same remarkable vocal dexterity-blues shouter meets jazz stylist; same espresso-strength power; same immaculate clarity; same ability to shift seamlessly from sassy to torchy. Russell has, across previous albums, liberally exercised her predilection for vintage material, though never as deliberately as here. The main theme is tunes you’d have heard throughout Harlem when the likes of Ida Cox and Bessie Smith ruled the musical roost.

Peter Vacher of London Jazz News wrote:

For this 2015 recording, her sixth outing for the label, she’s chosen to revisit classic songs from Harlem’s heyday associated with such great names as Ethel Waters, Billie Holiday and Bessie Smith... She can be lusty when appropriate but stays well away from self-conscious parody or period ricky-tick in this fine programme, the arrangements [and solos] neatly fashioned and appropriate. Russell is blessed with perfect intonation, vocal warmth and a natural inclination to give these time-honoured lyrics their proper due. Old-fashioned values maybe, but in a good way.

== Track listing ==
| No. | Title | Writer(s) | Length |
|---|---|---|---|
| 1. | "Harlem on My Mind" | Irving Berlin | 4:17 |
| 2. | "I Can't Believe That You're in Love with Me" | Clarence Gaskill, Jimmy McHugh | 4:11 |
| 3. | "Swing! Brother, Swing!" | Walter Bishop, Lewis Raymond, Clarence Williams | 5:06 |
| 4. | "The Very Thought of You" | Ray Noble | 3:55 |
| 5. | "You've Got the Right Key but the Wrong Keyhole" | Eddie Green, Clarence Williams | 3:55 |
| 6. | "Don't Take Your Love from Me" | Henry Nemo | 4:52 |
| 7. | "Blue Turning Grey Over You" | Andy Razaf, Fats Waller | 3:12 |
| 8. | "You're My Thrill" | Sydney Claire, Jay Gorney | 4:43 |
| 9. | "I Want a Man" | Deborah Chessler | 3:56 |
| 10. | "When Lights Are Low" | Benny Carter, Spencer Williams | 4:51 |
| 11. | "Talk to Me" | Joe Seneca | 3:21 |
| 12. | "Let Me Be the First to Know" | Leroy Kirkland, Dinah Washington, Pearl Woods | 5:04 |
| Total length: | | | 50:02 |

== Personnel ==
- Catherine Russell - lead vocals
- Matt Munisteri - guitar, musical director
- Tal Ronen - bass
- Mark Shane - piano
- Mark McLean - drums

with:

- Andy Farber - tenor saxophone
- Mark Lopeman - baritone saxophone
- Dan Block - alto saxophone
- Alphonso Horne, Jon-Erik Kellso - trumpet
- John Allred - trombone
- Fred Staton - tenor saxophone on "Don't Take Your Love from Me"
