= List of number-one singles of 1982 (Canada) =

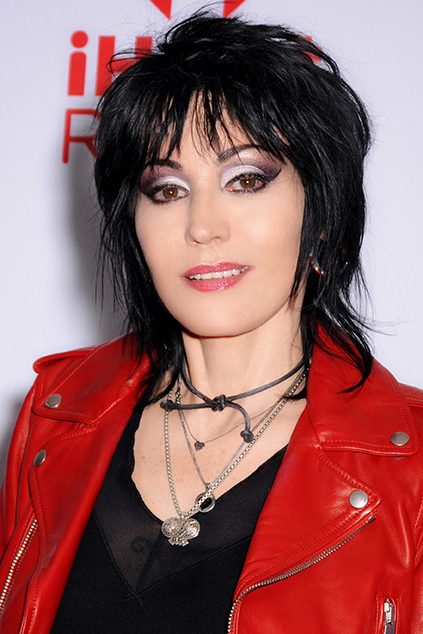
Joan Jett, alongside her band the Blackhearts, spent eight weeks at number one in 1982 with "I Love Rock 'n Roll", the year's highest-selling single in Canada.

RPM was a Canadian magazine that published the best-performing singles of Canada from 1964 to 2000. Twenty singles peaked atop the RPM Singles Chart in 1982. "Physical" by Olivia Newton-John held the top position from 1981 into 1982, and Toni Basil achieved the final number-one hit of the year with "Mickey". Olivia Newton-John, Paul McCartney, Stevie Wonder, Steve Miller Band, Chicago, and Lionel Richie were the only acts that had previously topped the Canadian chart before this year. No artists peaked at number one more than once in 1982.

The sole Canadian act to peak at number one this year was rock band Rush. Joan Jett and the Blackhearts had the most successful single of the year with their cover of Arrows' "I Love Rock 'n Roll", which topped the listing for eight issues in March, April, and May. Survivor peaked at number one for six weeks with "Eye of the Tiger" while "Ebony and Ivory", a duet between Paul McCartney and Stevie Wonder, spent five weeks at the summit. Olivia Newton-John, The J. Geils Band, and Charlene remained at number one for four weeks with their respective singles, and Soft Cell and Men at Work both topped the listing for three weeks.

Key
† Indicates best-performing single of 1982

== Chart history ==
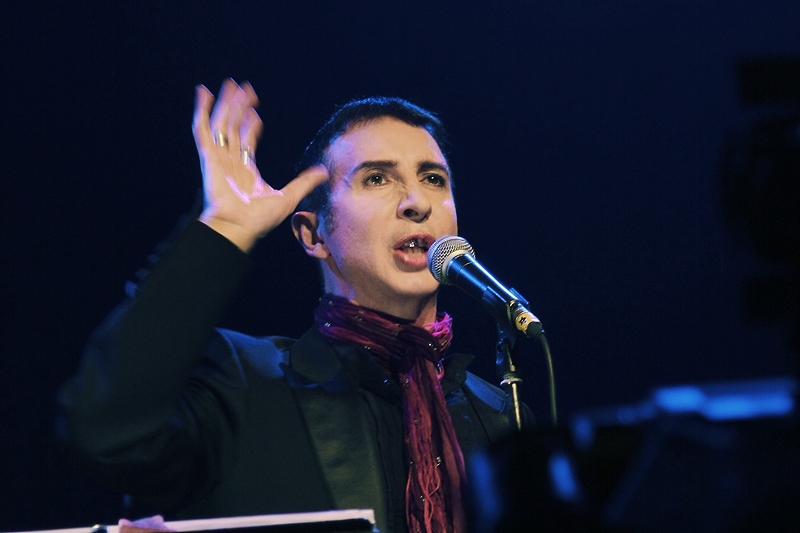
English duo Soft Cell (vocalist Marc Almond pictured) reached number one for three weeks with their cover version of "Tainted Love".

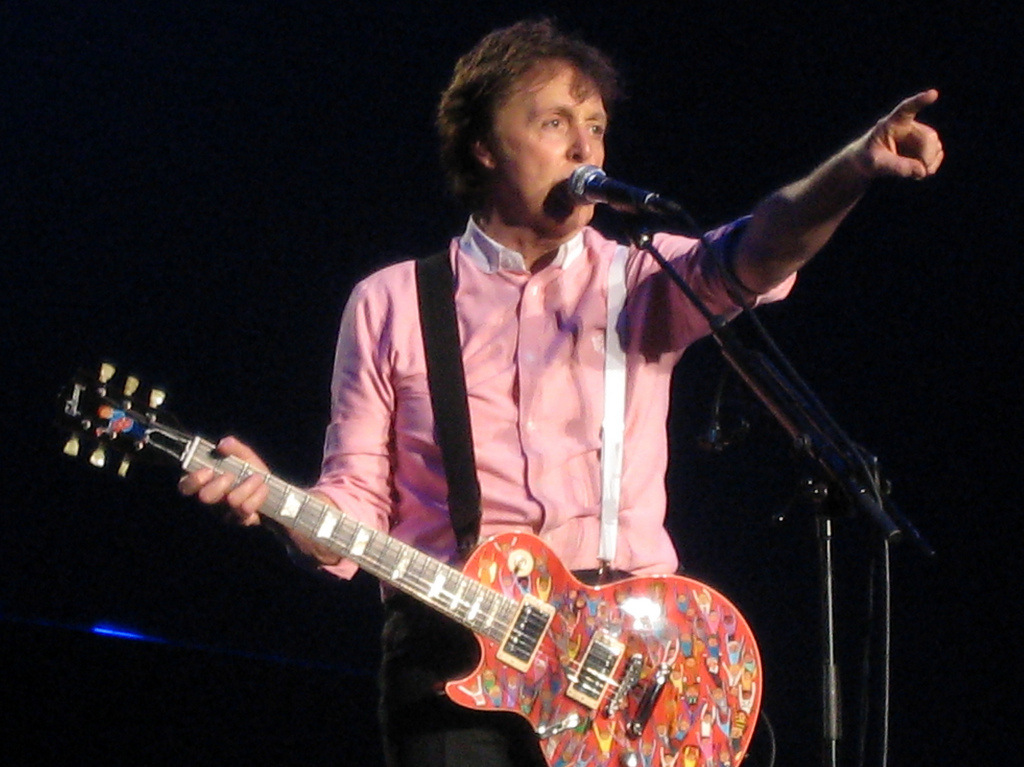
"Ebony and Ivory", a duet between Paul McCartney (pictured) and Stevie Wonder, remained at number one for five weeks in mid-1982.

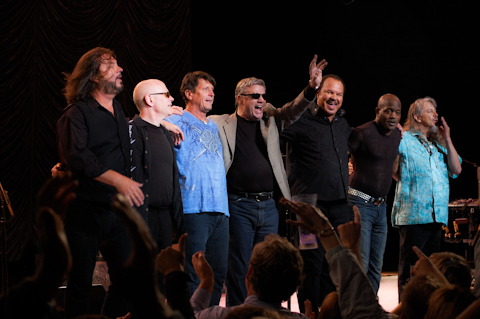
Steve Miller Band garnered a Canadian number-one single in 1982 with "Abracadabra".

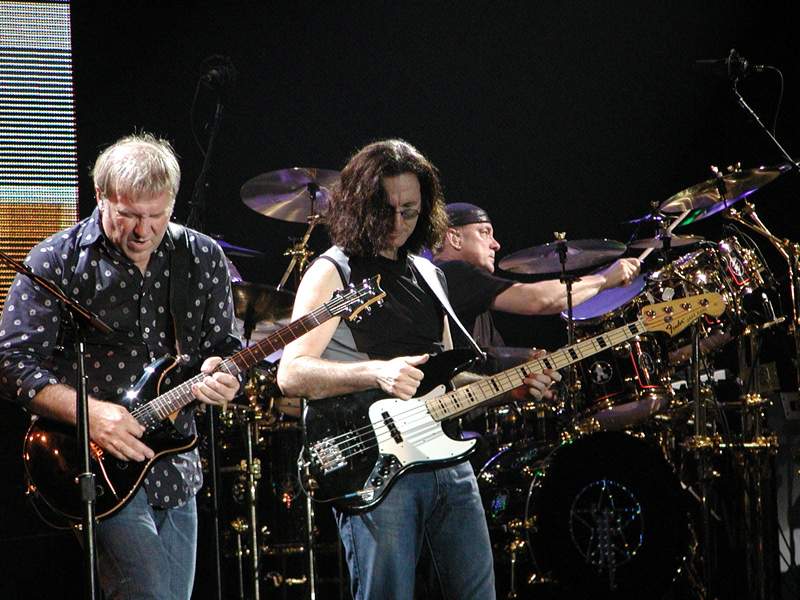
Rush was the only Canadian act to have a number-one single in their home country during 1982, doing so with "New World Man".

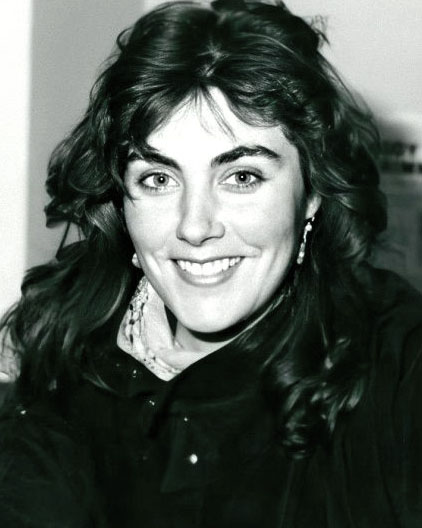
Laura Branigan topped the chart for a single week in November with her version of "Gloria".

Issue date	Song	Artist	Reference
2 January (Note: Due to a two-week break in publication over the 1981/1982 New Year period, the weeks of 2 January and 9 January are inferred.)	"Physical"	Olivia Newton-John	
9 January	"Physical"	Olivia Newton-John	
16 January	"Physical"	Olivia Newton-John	
23 January	"Physical"	Olivia Newton-John	
30 January	"Centerfold"	The J. Geils Band	
6 February	"Centerfold"	The J. Geils Band	
13 February	"Centerfold"	The J. Geils Band	
20 February	"Centerfold"	The J. Geils Band	
27 February	"Tainted Love"	Soft Cell	
6 March	"Tainted Love"	Soft Cell	
13 March	"Tainted Love"	Soft Cell	
20 March	"I Love Rock 'n Roll"†	Joan Jett and the Blackhearts	
27 March	"I Love Rock 'n Roll"†	Joan Jett and the Blackhearts	
3 April	"I Love Rock 'n Roll"†	Joan Jett and the Blackhearts	
10 April	"I Love Rock 'n Roll"†	Joan Jett and the Blackhearts	
17 April	"I Love Rock 'n Roll"†	Joan Jett and the Blackhearts	
24 April	"I Love Rock 'n Roll"†	Joan Jett and the Blackhearts	
1 May	"I Love Rock 'n Roll"†	Joan Jett and the Blackhearts	
8 May	"I Love Rock 'n Roll"†	Joan Jett and the Blackhearts	
15 May	"Don't You Want Me"	The Human League	
22 May	"Ebony and Ivory"	Paul McCartney and Stevie Wonder	
29 May	"Ebony and Ivory"	Paul McCartney and Stevie Wonder	
5 June	"Ebony and Ivory"	Paul McCartney and Stevie Wonder	
12 June	"Ebony and Ivory"	Paul McCartney and Stevie Wonder	
19 June	"Ebony and Ivory"	Paul McCartney and Stevie Wonder	
26 June	"I've Never Been to Me"	Charlene	
3 July	"I've Never Been to Me"	Charlene	
10 July	"I've Never Been to Me"	Charlene	
17 July	"I've Never Been to Me"	Charlene	
24 July	"Abracadabra"	Steve Miller Band	
31 July	"Eye of the Tiger"	Survivor	
7 August	"Eye of the Tiger"	Survivor	
14 August	"Eye of the Tiger"	Survivor	
21 August	"Eye of the Tiger"	Survivor	
28 August	"Eye of the Tiger"	Survivor	
4 September	"Eye of the Tiger"	Survivor	
11 September	"Hard to Say I'm Sorry"	Chicago	
18 September	"Jack & Diane"	John Cougar	
25 September	"Jack & Diane"	John Cougar	
2 October	"Eye in the Sky"	The Alan Parsons Project	
9 October	"New World Man"	Rush	
16 October	"New World Man"	Rush	
23 October	"Down Under"	Men at Work	
30 October	"Down Under"	Men at Work	
6 November	"Down Under"	Men at Work	
13 November	"The Look of Love"	ABC	
20 November	"Gloria"	Laura Branigan	
27 November	"Up Where We Belong"	Joe Cocker and Jennifer Warnes	
4 December	"Up Where We Belong"	Joe Cocker and Jennifer Warnes	
11 December	"Dirty Laundry"	Don Henley	
18 December	"Truly"	Lionel Richie	
25 December	"Mickey"	Toni Basil	

== See also ==
- 1982 in music
- List of RPM number-one adult contemporary singles of 1982
- List of RPM number-one country singles of 1982
- List of Billboard Hot 100 number ones of 1982
- List of Cashbox Top 100 number-one singles of 1982
- List of Canadian number-one albums of 1982
