= Flamethrower (song) =

Single by The J. Geils Band

from the album Freeze Frame
- A-side: "Freeze Frame"
- Released: January 1982
- Recorded: 1981
- Genre: Blues rock, new wave, dance-rock
- Length: 4:58
- Label: EMI
- Songwriter: Seth Justman

The J. Geils Band singles chronology
"Centerfold" (1981)	"Flamethrower" (1982)	"Angel in Blue" (1982)

"Flamethrower" is a song by the J. Geils Band released in 1982 as the B-side to the single "Freeze Frame", from their multi million selling album of the same name.

== Reception ==
"Flamethrower" received major airplay on urban contemporary radio, reaching number 25 on the Billboard Black/Soul singles chart. The song also received airplay on rock and Top 40 stations. AllMusic critic Stephen Thomas Erlewine praised the song's hard-boogie riff. Record World described the song as "black radio." Classic Rock History critic Brian Kachejian named "Flamethrower" as the band's 5th best song, particularly praising the "opening drum and guitar licks." Ultimate Classic Rock critic Nick DeRiso felt it was hearkened back effectively to the band's early "bar-band anthems".

== Chart positions ==
Chart (1982)	Peak position
U.S. Billboard Hot Dance Club Play	12
U.S. Billboard Hot Black Singles	25
