= My Ideal =

Album by Catherine Russell and Sean Mason

Studio album by Catherine Russell and Sean Mason
- Released: August 23, 2024
- Genre: Jazz
- Length: 43:17
- Label: Dot Time
- Producer: Catherine Russell; Paul Kahn; Katherine Miller

Catherine Russell chronology
Send for Me (2022)	My Ideal (2024)

Sean Mason chronology
The Southern Suite (2023)	My Ideal (2024)

My Ideal is a collaborative studio album by Catherine Russell and Sean Mason, released on August 23, 2024 through Dot Time Records. It received a Grammy Award nomination for Best Jazz Vocal Album.

== Track listing ==
My Ideal track listing
No.	Title	Writer(s)	Length
1.	"A Porter's Love Song (To a Chambermaid)"	James P. Johnson; Andy Razaf	4:58
2.	"I Don't Need No Doctor"	Nick Ashford; Valerie Simpson; Jo Armstead	3:02
3.	"My Ideal"	Richard A. Whiting; Newell Chase; Leo Robin	4:40
4.	"You Stayed Away Too Long"	Richard A. Whiting; J. C. Johnson; Nat Schwartz	3:18
5.	"On the Sentimental Side"	James V. Monaco; Johnny Burke	3:12
6.	"You Can Depend on Me"	Charles Carpenter; Louis Dunlap; Earl Hines	3:14
7.	"Ain't That Love"	Ray Charles	4:26
8.	"The Best Things Happen While You're Dancing"	Irving Berlin	3:16
9.	"Ain't Got Nobody to Grind My Coffee"	Spencer Williams; Bud Allen	3:38
10.	"South to a Warmer Place"	Loonis McGlohon; Alec Wilder	5:44
11.	"Waitin' for the Train to Come In"	Martin Block; Sunny Skylar	3:49
Total length:			43:17
