= A Breath of Fresh Air (album) =

2025 studio album by Sean Mason

Studio album by Sean Mason
- Released: October 24, 2025
- Genre: Jazz
- Length: 42:09
- Label: Taylor Christian

A Breath of Fresh Air is the second studio album by American jazz pianist Sean Mason. It was released on October 24, 2025, on Taylor Christian Records. The album was recorded at Bunker Studios in Brooklyn, New York, and features the same quintet as Mason's 2023 debut, The Southern Suite.

== Reception ==
Jazzwise wrote that the album "needs no external justification." JAZZIZ noted "a bounty of sophistication." The Dutch outlet Jazzism called it "a masterpiece." Goldmine included it in its "Best of the Best" jazz releases of 2025. Jazz Journal named it an Editor's Pick. The album was featured on NPR's New Music Friday. Mason discussed the album on WNYC's All Of It with Alison Stewart. He was also profiled in JazzTimes around the album's release.

== Track listing ==
All tracks composed by Sean Mason.

#	Title	Length
1	Rediscovery	4:22
2	Secrets	7:40
3	Duende	5:15
4	Boneback	3:42
5	Open Your Heart	7:29
6	Unfinished Business	4:06
7	Capital J	4:08
8	Kiss Me	5:27
	Total length	42:09
