= Up to No Good =

Studio album by Peter Wolf
- Released: February 1990
- Studios: 16th Avenue Sound and Emerald (Nashville, TN); The Bennett House and The Castle (Franklin, TN)
- Genres: Rock, hard rock
- Length: 43:23
- Label: MCA
- Producers: Peter Wolf, Robert White Johnson, Taylor Rhodes

Peter Wolf chronology
Come As You Are (1987)	Up to No Good (1990)	Long Line (1996)

Up to No Good is the third solo album by the American musician Peter Wolf, released in February 1990 on MCA Records.

== Production ==
The album was produced by Wolf, Robert White Johnson, and Taylor Rhodes. "Never Let It Go" is about the car crash that killed Wolf's high school girlfriend.

== Critical reception ==
Professional ratings
Review scores
Source	Rating
Calgary Herald	C−
Robert Christgau	(dud)
Los Angeles Times	2.5/5 stars
Ottawa Citizen	4/5 stars
(The New) Rolling Stone Album Guide	3/5 stars

The Calgary Herald missed "the juvenile appeal that Wolf lucked into just before he and his J. Geils Band buddies went their separate ways." The Toronto Star wrote that "it's a charming record, a lively and knowledgeable tome that finds its ground somewhere between the Detroit and Philadelphia schools of soul, while standing firm on a harder rock footing."

The Ottawa Citizen labeled some of the songs "classic primal funk with a conscience." The Globe and Mail dismissed the album as "just one more attempt to capitalize on the appealing, but somewhat limited, rockaboogie sound Geils and company milked throughout the seventies."

== Track listing ==
All songs written by Peter Wolf, Taylor Rhodes and Robert White Johnson, unless noted otherwise.

1. "99 Worlds" – 3:35
2. "Go Wild" – 3:43
3. "When Women Are Lonely" – 3:45
4. "Drive All Night" (Wolf, Desmond Child) – 3:42
5. "Up to No Good" – 4:33
6. "Lost in Babylon" – 3:57
7. "Arrows and Chains" – 3:25
8. "Daydream Getaway" (Janna Allen, Wolf) – 3:44
9. "Shades of Red – Shades of Blue" – 4:07
10. "River Runs Dry" – 5:01
11. "Never Let It Go" (Wolf, Will Jennings) – 3:57

== Personnel ==
- Peter Wolf – vocals, backing vocals, harmonica
- Mike Lawler – keyboards
- Alan St. John – keyboards
- Byron House – keyboards, bass
- Taylor Rhodes – keyboards, guitars, percussion, backing vocals
- Johnny Neel – acoustic piano
- Matt Rollings – acoustic piano
- Larry Chaney – guitars
- Jeff Golub – guitars
- Barry Tashian – guitars
- Jimmie Lee Sloas – bass
- Angus Thomas – bass
- Bobby Chouinard – drums
- Robert White Johnson – percussion, backing vocals
- Terry McMillan – harmonica
- Arno Hecht – horns
- Jim Horn – horns
- Sam Levine – horns
- Wayne Jackson – horns
- Vicki Hampton – backing vocals (7, 11)
- Kim Morrison – backing vocals (7, 11)

Technical personnel

- Peter Wolf – producer
- Robert White Johnson – producer
- Taylor Rhodes – producer
- Rob Feaster – engineer, mixing
- Paula Montondo – assistant engineer
- Bob Ludwig – mastering at Masterdisk (New York, NY)
- Manhattan Design – design
- Todd Schorr – cover painting
- Bobby DiMarzo – black and white photography
- Jeff Katz – color photography

== Charts ==
Up to No Good chart performance
Year	Chart	Position
1990	The Billboard 200	111
