= Come as You Are (album) =

Come As You Are

Studio album by Peter Wolf
- Released: March 20, 1987
- Studios: Syncro Sound (Boston); Hit Factory (New York City)
- Genre: Rock
- Length: 39:56
- Label: EMI America
- Producers: Peter Wolf, Eric Thorngren

Peter Wolf chronology
Lights Out (1984)	Come As You Are (1987)	Up to No Good (1990)

Professional ratings
Review scores
Source	Rating
AllMusic	link

Come As You Are is the second solo album by Peter Wolf, released in 1987. "Come As You Are" was a major hit for Wolf, peaking at #15 on the Billboard Hot 100 and #1 on the Mainstream Rock Tracks chart for one week.

The music video for "Come As You Are" is based on Bobby Van's memorable "street dance" from Small Town Girl. In the video, Peter Wolf hops around a 1950s small town similar to the one in the movie, and he passes a poster for Small Town Girl as a direct reference to the inspiration for the video.

== Track listing ==
All tracks written by Peter Wolf, except where noted.

1. "Can't Get Started" – 3:01
2. "Love on Ice" (Wolf, Tim Mayer) – 4:12
3. "Thick as Thieves" (Wolf, Tim Mayer) – 2:59
4. "Blue Avenue" (Wolf, Mayer, Barry Goldberg) – 4:06
5. "Wind Me Up" – 2:49
6. "Come as You Are" (Wolf, Mayer) – 2:43
7. "Flame of Love" – 4:16
8. "Mamma Said" (Wolf, Michael Jonzun) – 4:04
9. "Magic Moon" – 3:39
10. "2 Lane" – 3:23
11. "Run Silent Run Deep" (Wolf, Tim Mayer) – 4:39

== Personnel ==
- Peter Wolf – vocals, backing vocals
- Tommy Mandel – keyboards
- Victor LeComer – keyboards
- John Songdahl – keyboards
- Jeff Golub – guitars
- Skip McDonald – guitars
- Jim Gregory – bass guitar
- Doug Wimbish – bass guitar
- Bobby Chouinard – drums
- Steve Scales – percussion
- Arno Hecht – horns
- John Turi – horns
- Lani Groves – backing vocals
- Frank Simms – backing vocals
- George Simms – backing vocals
- Bird Taylor – backing vocals
- Buck Taylor – backing vocals

Technical personnel

- Peter Wolf – producer
- Eric "ET" Thorngren – producer, recording, mixing
- Gary Wright – recording assistant
- Marc Cobrin – mix assistant
- Jack Skinner – mastering at Sterling Sound (New York City, New York)
- Henry Marquez – art direction
- Janet Perr – art direction, design
- Annie Leibovitz – photography

== Commercial uses ==
After its July 1990 acquisition by the Universal Church of the Kingdom of God, the Brazilian television channel Rede Record used the song "Come as You Are" in a clip. The same song was used in a documentary about 40 years of Brazilian TV, September 18, 1990, from TV Cultura of São Paulo.
