= Freeze-Frame (song) =

Song by The J. Geils Band

Single by The J. Geils Band

from the album Freeze Frame
- B-side: "Flamethrower"
- Released: January 14, 1982
- Recorded: 1981
- Genre: Rock; pop
- Length: 3:58
- Label: EMI
- Songwriters: Seth Justman; Peter Wolf
- Producer: Seth Justman

The J. Geils Band singles chronology
"Centerfold" (1981)	"Freeze-Frame" (1982)	"Flamethrower" (1982)

"Freeze-Frame" is a song written by Seth Justman and Peter Wolf for the J. Geils Band. It was first released as the opening track on the chart-topping 1981 album of the same name. The song was released on a 45 in early 1982 as the second single from the album, following the million-selling US #1/UK #3 hit "Centerfold". The single's flip side, "Flamethrower", received airplay on urban contemporary radio stations throughout the United States, and reached #20 on the Billboard Soul Chart.

== Reception ==
Billboard called it a "zesty, exuberant rocker" and praised the song's hooks. Record World said that "Seth Justman's bouncy keyboard melodies and the slap-happy beat back Peter Wolf's lively lead vocal."

Ultimate Classic Rock critic Michael Gallucci rated "Freeze-Frame" to be the band's 7th greatest song, saying that it has "a glossy pop sheen ready-made for Top 40 radio."

== Chart performance ==
"Centerfold" had landed the band at the top of the Billboard Hot 100 for 6 weeks in early 1982 and would ultimately give them a UK top 3 hit almost a year later. "Freeze-Frame" was chosen as the second single and at the peak of the band's popularity, became the second consecutive million-selling gold-certified hit from the album, ultimately peaking at No. 4 on the Hot 100 on April 10, 1982, and remained in that position for 4 weeks, after entering the charts in mid-February. The single reached No. 27 in the UK.

== Charts ==
=== Weekly charts ===
Weekly chart performance for "Freeze Frame"
Chart (1982–1983)	Peak position
Australia (Kent Music Report)	7
Belgium (Ultratop 50 Flanders)	5
Canada	2
Ireland (IRMA)	20
Netherlands (Dutch Top 40)	5
Netherlands (Single Top 100)	13
New Zealand (Recorded Music NZ)	6
Switzerland (Schweizer Hitparade)	11
UK Singles (OCC)	27
US Billboard Hot 100	4
West Germany (GfK)	29

=== Year-end charts ===
Year-end chart performance for "Freeze Frame"
Chart (1982)	Position
Australia (Kent Music Report)	91
Belgium (Ultratop Flanders)	90
Canada	22
Netherlands (Dutch Top 40)	83
US Billboard Hot 100	49

== Certifications ==
Certifications for "Freeze Frame"
Region	Certification	Certified units/sales
Canada (Music Canada)	Gold	50,000^{^}
United States (RIAA)	Gold	1,000,000^{^}
^{^} Shipments figures based on certification alone.

== B-side ==
Most versions of the single released domestically and internationally used "Flamethrower", the sixth track from Freeze-Frame, as the flip side to "Freeze-Frame". However, 7" vinyl releases in the UK alternated between "Flamethrower" and another song from the same album, the second track "Rage in the Cage". A limited edition Picture Disc of "Freeze-Frame" released in North America used "Centerfold" as the b-side.
