= Long Line =

Studio album by Peter Wolf
- Released: May 14, 1996
- Studio: Longview (North Brookfield, MA); Prophet Sound (Stoughton, MA); Sound Techniques (Boston, MA); Normandy Sound (Warren, RI).
- Genre: Rock
- Length: 47:13
- Label: Reprise
- Producer: Peter Wolf, Johnny A., Stu Kimball

Peter Wolf chronology
Up to No Good (1990)	Long Line (1996)	Fool's Parade (1998)

Singles from Long Line
- 1. "Long Line" Released: 1996; 2. "Romeo Is Dead" Released: 1996

Long Line is the fourth solo album by Peter Wolf, released in 1996. The album marked a shift in Wolf's music from pop rock to a bluesier rock with more personal, introspective lyrics. It had been six years since the release of his previous album, the delay largely due to legal problems with his previous record company MCA. In the interim, Wolf performed gigs in the Boston area with his band Houseparty Five, who then served as the backing band on his tour for this album under the name The Street Ensemble.

== Critical reception ==
Professional ratings
Review scores
Source	Rating
AllMusic	3.5/5 stars
Rolling Stone	4/5 stars

Rolling Stone said, "The arrangements on Long Line, with their crisp guitar licks and neatly vigorous keyboards, feel a bit slick at times. But tunes like the sparkling, hip-hop-laced 'Romeo Is Dead' and the wistful 'Two Loves' are bound to prove irresistible."

== Track listing ==
1. "Long Line" (Angelo Petraglia, Stu Kimball, Wolf) – 3:33
2. "Romeo Is Dead" (Will Jennings, Wolf) – 3:24
3. "Rosie" (Taylor Rhodes, Wolf) – 4:26
4. "Forty to One" (Aimee Mann, Wolf) – 3:00
5. "Goodbye (Is All I'll Send Her)" (Kimball, Wolf) – 3:54
6. "Wastin' Time" (Wolf) – 4:16
7. "Sky High" (Jennings, Wolf) – 3:45
8. "Two Loves" (Wolf) – 3:30
9. "Break This Chain" (Robert White Johnson, Rhodes, Wolf) – 4:46
10. "Seventh Heaven" (Johnson, Rhodes, Wolf) – 3:47
11. "Starvin' to Death" (Mann, Wolf) – 3:27
12. "Riverside Drive" (Wolf) – 5:25

== Personnel ==
- Peter Wolf – vocals, harmonica
- Brian Maes – keyboards, backing vocals
- Bob Tudor – keyboards (5, 12)
- Doug Dube – organ (12)
- Johnny A. – guitars
- Stuart Kimball – guitars, organ (7)
- Tom Belliveau – pedal steel guitar (8)
- Tim Archibald – bass
- David Stefanelli – drums, percussion
- George Correia – congas (3), maracas (3)
- Matt Leavenworth – fiddle (8)
- Ken Field – flute (12), saxophone (12)
- Beth A. – backing vocals
- Patty Barkas – backing vocals, vocals (12)
- Brad Delp – backing vocals
- Charlie Farren – backing vocals
- Holly Palmer – backing vocals
- Tom Soares – backing vocals
- Bird Taylor – backing vocals
- Buck Taylor – backing vocals

Technical personnel

- Peter Wolf – producer, illustrations
- Johnny A. – co-producer, photography
- Stu Kimball – co-producer
- Tom Soares – engineer, overdub recording, mixing (1, 2, 3, 5–12)
- Phil Greene – mixing (4)
- Jessie Henderson – assistant engineer
- Marc LaFleur – assistant engineer
- Dave Kirkpatrick – overdub recording assistant
- Ted Paduck – overdub recording assistant
- Brenda Ferry – mix assistant
- Bob Ludwig – mastering at Gateway Mastering (Portland, Maine)
- Linda Cobb – art direction, design
- Nancy Hodgins – photography
- David Seltzer – photography
- Heidi Wells – grooming
