= Twilight Festival =

Cultural festival in Columbia, Missouri

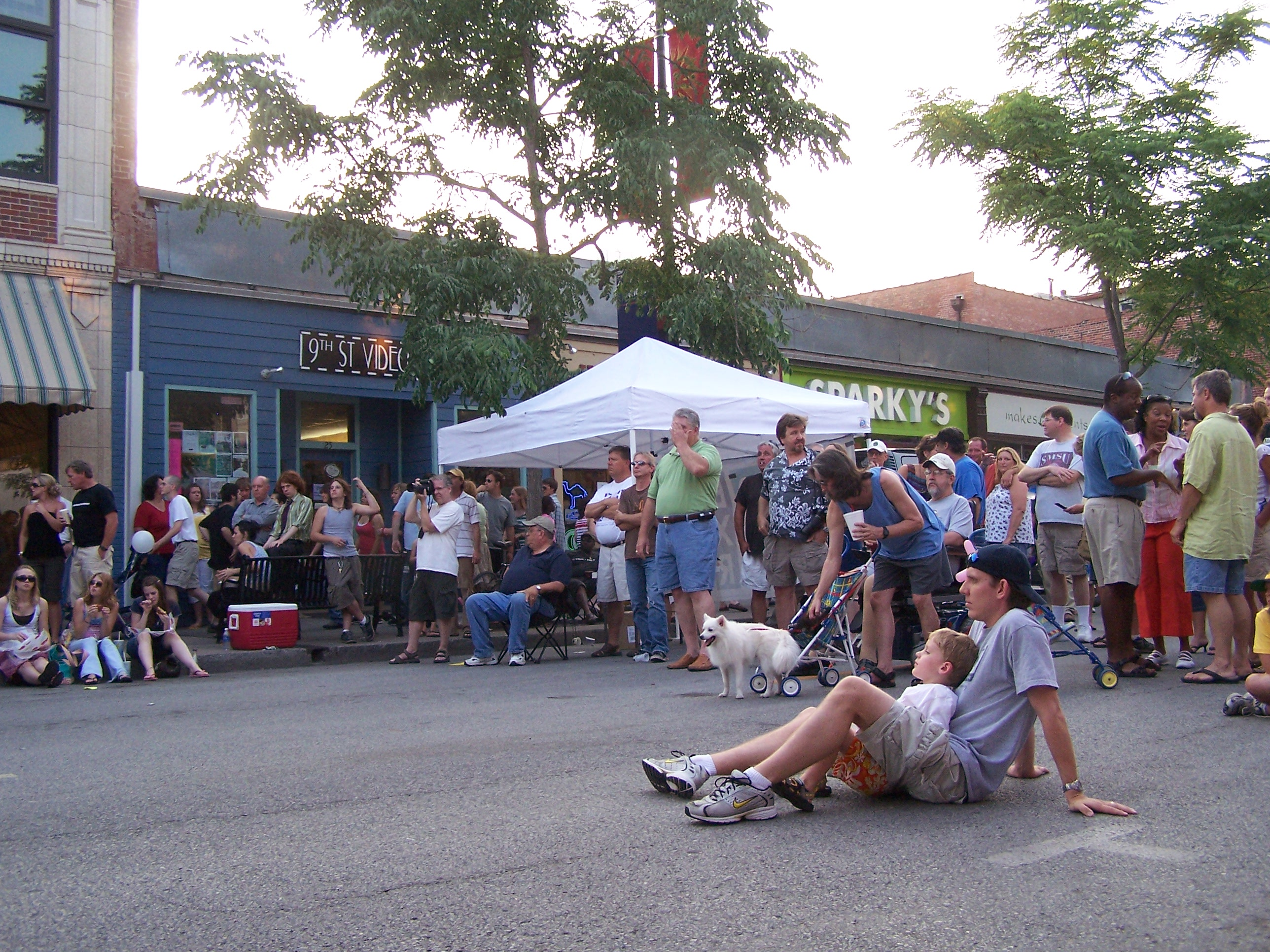
- Downtown Columbia during the Twilight Festival.
- Dates: Thursdays in June and September
- Location: Columbia, Missouri
- Years active: 1990 – 2008
- Website: http://www.twilightfestival.com/

Twilight Festival was a cultural festival that began in 1990 in Columbia, Missouri. The festival consists of local bands playing throughout downtown Columbia, in addition to a booked band on the William Woods stage. An area is set up for kids at Flat Branch park with several different activities. The festival has an attendance of 10,000 people each night. On August 23, 2008, it was announced that September would be the last month of the festival.
