= Freeze Frame (The J. Geils Band album) =

1981 album by The J. Geils Band

Freeze-Frame

Studio album by the J. Geils Band
- Released: October 26, 1981
- Recorded: 1980–1981
- Studio: Long View Farm, North Brookfield, Massachusetts
- Genre: Rock; new wave
- Length: 40:55
- Label: EMI
- Producer: Seth Justman

The J. Geils Band chronology
Love Stinks (1980)	Freeze-Frame (1981)	Showtime! (1982)

Singles from Freeze-Frame
- 1. "Centerfold/"Rage in the Cage" Released: September 13, 1981; 2. "Freeze-Frame/"Flamethrower" Released: January 14, 1982; 3. "Angel in Blue/"River Blindness" Released: May 26, 1982

Freeze-Frame is the tenth studio album by American rock band the J. Geils Band, and the last one to feature original vocalist Peter Wolf. The album was released on October 26, 1981, by EMI Records. It reached number one on the United States Billboard 200 album chart in February 1982, and remained at the top for four weeks. The album featured the hit singles "Centerfold" (No. 1 US; No. 3 UK) and "Freeze-Frame" (No. 4 US). "Angel in Blue" also reached the US Top 40. The album was supported by a large marketing campaign and world tour.

Keyboardist Seth Justman wrote or co-wrote all of the album as well as receiving credit as arranger and producer of the material.

== Release ==
Freeze Frame was released on October 26, 1981, by EMI Records. The album debuted at No. 62, and peaked at number one on the Billboard 200 album chart. The album was certified platinum by the Recording Industry Association of America (RIAA) on January 11, 1982.

Three singles were released from the album. "Centerfold" was the lead single from the album. It peaked at number one on the Billboard Hot 100 chart. "Freeze-Frame" was released in January 1982, with "Flamethrower" as the flip side. It peaked at number four on the Billboard Hot 100. "Angel in Blue" was the third single from the album. The single peaked at No. 40 on the Billboard Hot 100. Music videos were made for all three singles.

== Promotion ==
The J. Geils Band supported the album with the "Freeze Frame" tour, during which they played shows in the US, Europe, Japan, Australia and Canada. EMI Records also prepared a large marketing campaign for the album.

The music video for "Centerfold" was directed by Paul Justman, the brother of the band's keyboardist Seth Justman, and recorded in Boston. The music video for "Freeze-Frame" was also directed by Paul Justman, and makes use of many special effects. The music video was shot at the Cintel Studio in Boston. A music video was also made for "Angel in Blue".

== Critical reception ==
Professional ratings
Review scores
Source	Rating
AllMusic	4/5 stars
Cash Box	(unrated)
Robert Christgau	B+
Rock 82	(favorable)
Rolling Stone	5/5 stars
The New Rolling Stone Album Guide	4/5 stars

A 2013 Spin article called "Flamethrower" the band's funkiest song and said: "With three avant-gardish anomalies that flirted with harmolodic punk-jazz funk ("Rage in the Cage," "Insane, Insane Again," and "River Blindness") balancing out three slick Top 10 pop hits, 1981's Freeze Frame holds the rare if not impossible distinction of being simultaneously both the J. Geils Band's most blatantly pop and mostly blatantly experimental album." Stephen Thomas Erlewine of AllMusic wrote "Good-time rock & roll remains at the core of the group's music, but the sound of the record is glossier, shining with synthesizers and big pop hooks." Billboard says that the album "trades their earlier guitar focus for producer Seth Justman's updated keyboard emphasis," and that the "new wave influence has been toned down slightly, yielding a welcome restoration of the partying humor that's never been entirely absent from this veteran group's work."

== Track listing ==
All songs written by Seth Justman, except where noted.

Side one
No.	Title	Writer(s)	Length
1.	"Freeze-Frame"	Justman, Peter Wolf	3:58
2.	"Rage in the Cage"	Justman, Wolf	4:56
3.	"Centerfold"		3:36
4.	"Do You Remember When"	Justman, Wolf	4:45
5.	"Insane, Insane Again"		4:43
Total length:			21:58

Side two
No.	Title	Writer(s)	Length
6.	"Flamethrower"		4:58
7.	"River Blindness"		6:06
8.	"Angel in Blue"		4:51
9.	"Piss on the Wall"	Justman, Wolf	3:02
Total length:			18:57 40:55

== Personnel ==
=== The J. Geils Band ===
- Peter Wolf – lead vocals
- Seth Justman – keyboards, vocals
- J. Geils – guitar
- Danny Klein – bass
- Magic Dick – harmonica, saxophone
- Stephen Jo Bladd – drums, vocals

=== Additional musicians ===
- Randy Brecker, Tom "Bones" Malone, Lou Marini, George Young, Ronnie Cuber, Alan Rubin – horns
- Tawatha Agee, Cissy Houston, Fonzi Thornton, Luther Vandross, Ken Williams – backing vocals
- Cengiz Yaltkaya – conductor

=== Production ===
- Seth Justman – producer, arrangements
- David Thoener – engineer, mixing at Record Plant, New York
- Jesse Henderson, Steve Marcantonio – assistant engineers
- Joe Brescio – mastering

== Charts ==
=== Weekly charts ===
Chart (1982)	Peak position
Australian Albums (Kent Music Report)	21
Austrian Albums (Ö3 Austria)	13
Canada (RPM) (5 weeks)	1
Dutch Albums (Album Top 100)	11
German Albums (Offizielle Top 100)	13
New Zealand Albums (RMNZ)	14
Swedish Albums (Sverigetopplistan)	13
UK Albums (OCC)	12
US Billboard 200	1

=== Year-end charts ===
Chart (1982)	Position
Canada Top 100 82	2
Dutch Albums (Album Top 100)	50
German Albums (Offizielle Top 100)	39
US Billboard 200	5

=== Singles ===
Year	Single	Chart	Peak position
1982	"Angel in Blue"	Billboard Hot 100	40
1982	"Centerfold"/"Flamethrower"	Club Play Singles	12
1982	"Centerfold"	Mainstream Rock Tracks	1
1982	"Centerfold"	Billboard Hot 100	1
1982	"Flamethrower"/"Freeze Frame"	Hot R&B/Hip Hop Singles & Tracks	25
1982	"Flamethrower"	Mainstream Rock Tracks	30
1982	"Freeze-Frame"	Mainstream Rock Tracks	8
1982	"Freeze-Frame"	Billboard Hot 100	4

== Certifications ==
Organization	Level	Date
RIAA – USA	Platinum	January 11, 1982
