= Centerfold (song) =

1981 single by The J. Geils Band

Single by The J. Geils Band

from the album Freeze Frame
- B-side: "Rage in the Cage"
- Released: October 20, 1981 (US) / September 13, 1981
- Genre: Power pop; pop rock; synth-rock; new wave
- Length: 3:36; 5:01 (12")
- Label: EMI America
- Songwriter: Seth Justman
- Producer: Seth Justman

The J. Geils Band singles chronology
"Just Can't Wait" (1980)	"Centerfold" (1981)	"Freeze-Frame" (1982)

Music video
- "Centerfold" on YouTube

"Centerfold" is a song by the J. Geils Band, released in September 1981 as the lead single from their tenth album Freeze Frame. It reached No. 1 on the U.S. Billboard Hot 100 in February 1982 and held that spot for six consecutive weeks, becoming the most successful single of the group's career.

== Overview ==
The song is about a man who is shocked to discover that his high school crush appeared in a centerfold spread for an unspecified men's magazine. The song's narrator is torn between conflicting feelings: his disappointment due to what he perceives as her loss of innocence, and his lust until the end of the song.

The song was the band's biggest hit and the only one to reach the top of the US charts. It was released in the fall of 1981, and eventually went to number one on the US Billboard Hot 100 in February 1982, and stayed there for six weeks. It was the first single released from the album Freeze Frame and the music video for the song was an early staple on recently launched MTV. It also peaked at number one in Australia and Canada.

In February 1982, after the song hit No. 1 in the US, "Centerfold" peaked at No. 3 in the UK Top 40, earning the J. Geils Band their only major hit single in the UK, although follow-up "Freeze-Frame" would also peak within the top 40 at No. 27.

Record World called it a "clever rocker" and said that "the na-na chorus and Peter Wolf's carefree vocals add up to an AOR-pop hit."

In 2018, the song was ranked at No. 66 on Billboard's All Time Top Songs. Ultimate Classic Rock critic Michael Gallucci rated it to be the band's all-time greatest song.

== Charts ==
=== Weekly charts ===
Chart (1982)	Peak position
Australia (Kent Music Report)	1
Belgium	2
Canadian Singles Chart	1
Germany	13
Ireland (IRMA)	2
Netherlands	4
New Zealand	5
South Africa (Springbok)	3
Switzerland	4
UK Singles Chart	3
US Billboard Hot 100	1

=== Year-end charts ===
Chart (1982)	Rank
Australia (Kent Music Report)	4
Canada	4
Netherlands	82
New Zealand	29
UK	28
US Billboard Hot 100	5

=== All-time charts ===
Chart (1958–2018)	Position
US Billboard Hot 100	73

== Certifications and sales ==
Region	Certification	Certified units/sales
Australia (ARIA)	Gold	50,000^{^}
Canada (Music Canada)	Platinum	100,000^{^}
United Kingdom (BPI)	Silver	250,000^{^}
United States (RIAA)	Gold	1,000,000^{^}
^{^} Shipments figures based on certification alone.

== See also ==
- List of number-one singles in Australia during the 1980s
- List of RPM number-one singles of 1982
- List of Hot 100 number-one singles of 1982 (U.S.)
- List of number-one mainstream rock hits (United States)
