= Kenny White =

American singer-songwriter

Kenny White is a New York City–based singer-songwriter, studio musician, and writer. For many years, White was a fixture in the NY studio scene, writing and producing hundreds of commercials for TV and radio. In this capacity, he worked with artists like Gladys Knight, Linda Ronstadt, Dwight Yoakam, Ricky Skaggs, Kim Carnes, Felix Cavaliere, Dobie Gray, Mavis Staples and Aaron Neville among many others.

== Career ==
His relationships with Marc Cohn and Shawn Colvin led to his producing Colvin's Grammy-nominated, "I Don’t Know Why" and to his involvement in Cohn's eponymous platinum debut record. White went on to produce three records for legendary J. Geils Band leader, Peter Wolf. The second of which, "Sleepless," garnered the distinction by Rolling Stone magazine of being one of "the 500 greatest albums ever made," as well as giving Kenny a chance to work with Keith Richards, Mick Jagger and Steve Earle. White was again at the helm for Wolf's 2010 critically acclaimed release, Midnight Souvenirs. This time working with Shelby Lynne, Neko Case and Merle Haggard. A new project with Wolf entitled, A Cure for Loneliness, was released in April 2016.

As a contributing writer/musician, White worked on many film soundtracks including, Message in a Bottle, Ed TV, Forces of Nature, A Walk on the Moon, Where the Heart Is, Edie & Pen, and four films by indie director, John Sayles.

After being hailed by reviewers from the NY Times to the SF Chronicle for his thrilling and unique piano playing, White chose to devote himself to making his first album and subsequently, "hitting the road." His work in the studio enabled him to assemble an A-list team of players for that release, 2002's Uninvited Guest. He traveled and opened shows for many mainstays, including Shawn Colvin, Cowboy Junkies, Peter Wolf, Cheryl Wheeler and Jonathan Edwards, quickly gaining a reputation as a ‘dazzling’ and ‘not-to-be-missed’ performer. An early copy of his follow-up record, Symphony in 16 Bars landed in the hands of folk legend Judy Collins who then signed White to her own Wildflower Records and released the CD in the winter of 2005. Showcasing another remarkable ensemble of talent, Symphony in 16 Bars picked up where Uninvited Guest left off, following the main character whose story, set in New York City, navigates the heart's complexities through an ever-changing urban landscape. In 2006, he compiled a politically tinged, 5 song EP entitled, Never Like This. In early 2008, White's "How Long" from that record, won in The 7th Annual Independent Music Awards for Best Social Action Song. White was also invited to accept the prestigious "International Songwriter" award at 2012's Premio Ciampi in Livorno, Italy.

In 2010, White released his Comfort in the Static, also on Collins', Wildflower Records label, earning high praise from David Crosby and celebrated songwriter, Will Jennings. NY's legendary DJ, Pete Fornatale declared Comfort in the Static the best album of 2010, "it's a lock," said Pete, 6 months before the end of that year. And now, in 2016, Kenny has just released his latest effort, Long List of Priors, featuring appearances by Peter Wolf and David Crosby, as well as Larry Campbell, Ada Dyer, Duke Levine, Shawn Pelton, Marty Ballou, John "Scrapper" Sneider, and with string arrangements handled by Antoine Silverman.

In 2010, Kenny announced his first non-musical publication, joining a group of renowned essayists in a collection called, The Black Body, published by Seven Stories Press.

== Discography ==
- Uninvited Guest (2002)
- Testing... 1, 2 (2003)
- Symphony in Sixteen Bars (2004)
- Never Like This (2006)
- Comfort in the Static (2010)
- Long List of Priors (2016)

=== Contributions ===
- Born to the Breed: A Tribute to Judy Collins (2008)
- The Black Body (2009)
- Jeff Golub (2009)
