= Peter Wolf =

American musician (born 1946)

Background information
- Also known as: Woofa Goofa
- Born: Peter Walter Blankfield; March 7, 1946 (age 80); New York City, U.S.
- Genres: Rock; blues; soul
- Occupations: Musician; singer; songwriter; painter
- Instruments: Vocals; piano; guitar; harmonica; percussion
- Years active: 1964–present
- Labels: Atlantic; EMI; Reprise; MCA; Mercury; Artemis; Concord
- Formerly of: The J. Geils Band
- Website: www.peterwolf.com

Peter Wolf (born March 7, 1946) is an American musician best known as the lead vocalist of The J. Geils Band from 1967 to 1983 and as a solo artist.

== Early life and education ==
Wolf was born Peter Walter Blankfield on March 7, 1946, in the Bronx, New York City. He attended the High School of Music & Art, located in west Harlem, Manhattan, near the Apollo Theater. He often attended the Apollo, seeing many of the famous soul, rhythm & blues, and gospel artists who influenced him.

He moved to Boston, Massachusetts, to attend the School of the Museum of Fine Arts at Tufts on scholarship, where he studied painting. His first roommate was film director David Lynch.

== Career ==
In 1964, Wolf and fellow art students Paul Shapiro (guitar), Doug Slade (guitar), Joe Clark (bass), and Stephen Jo Bladd (drums) formed a music group, The Hallucinations. They performed at nightclubs in the Combat Zone area of Boston and developed a large following as one of the first bands to play at the Boston Tea Party. During this period, they appeared on bills with The Velvet Underground, Howlin' Wolf, Muddy Waters, Van Morrison (who became close with Wolf while residing in nearby Cambridge, Massachusetts), John Lee Hooker, and Sun Ra.

During his time performing with the Hallucinations, Wolf was asked to help establish Boston's radio station WBCN and became their first all-night deejay creating the moniker Woofa Goofa as his on-air personality. His show became a popular late night staple where he interviewed many of the well-known rock, blues, and jazz artists that were touring through Boston in the late 1960s. In 1967, Wolf and Bladd joined the J. Geils Band. Wolf and keyboardist Seth Justman were responsible for most of the band's songwriting. Wolf was working in California in 1970; Barret Hansen credits Wolf with helping to develop the persona of Dr. Demento, which Wolf conceived as "some mythical character" while, as Hansen recalled, Wolf was "smoking some weed" with a mutual colleague.

During the early days of MTV, the band enjoyed heavy airplay of their videos "Centerfold" and "Love Stinks". They toured stadiums with the Rolling Stones and others. Following the success of Freeze Frame, the other band members wanted to take the band in a new pop direction musically, but Wolf wanted to stick to a more roots-based direction so he was asked to leave in 1983. In the ensuing years the band has been nominated five times for the Rock and Roll Hall of Fame.

== Solo work ==
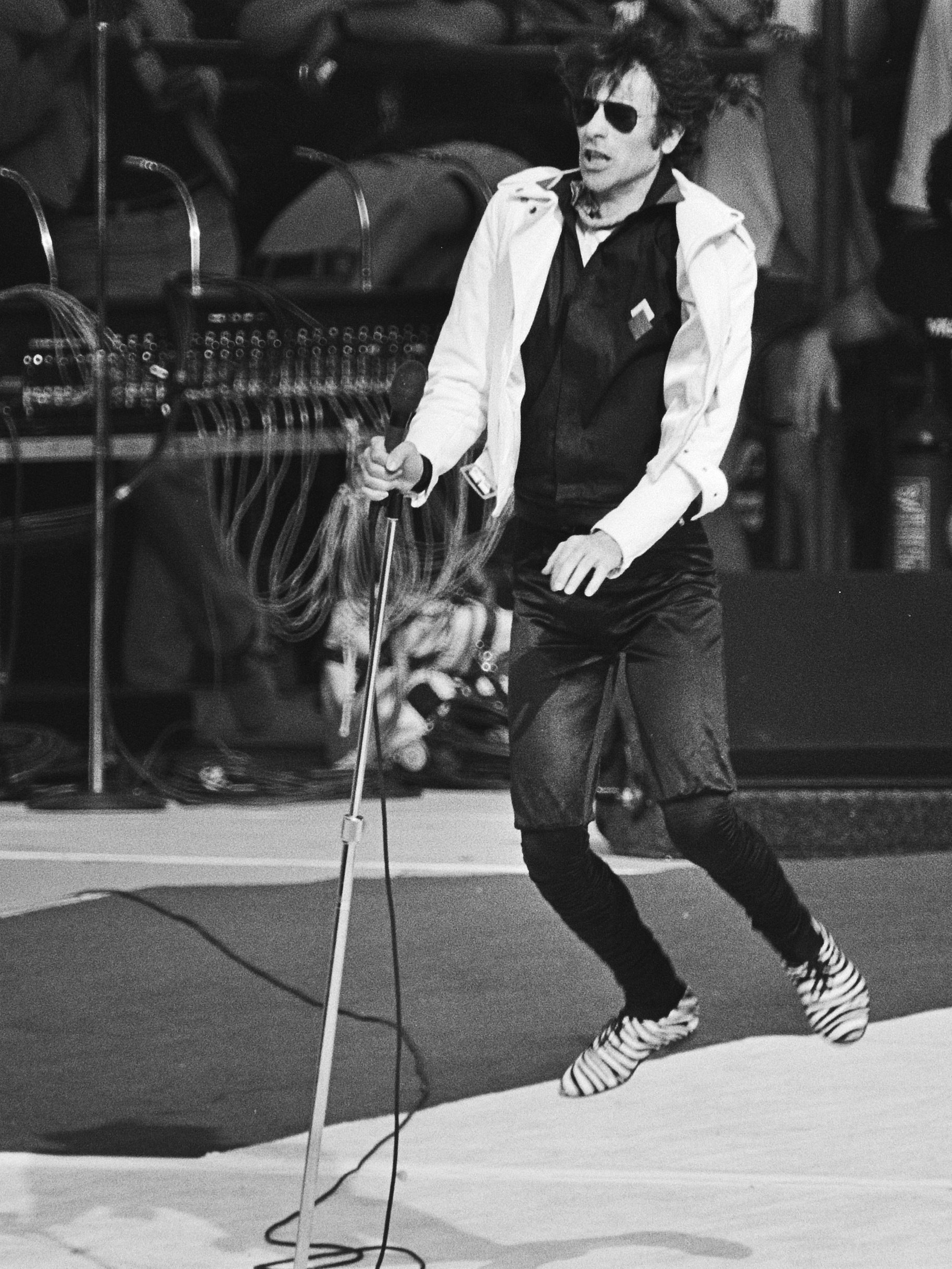
Wolf performing in 1982

Wolf's first solo record Lights Out (1984) was produced with Michael Jonzun of the Jonzun Crew. The album features Adrian Belew, G. E. Smith, Elliot Randall, Yogi Horton, Mick Jagger, Elliot Easton, and Maurice Starr. The single "Lights Out" written with Don Covay became a hit the same year, peaking at No. 12 on the Billboard Hot 100. The song was featured in the 1984 Rob Reiner film The Sure Thing.

In 1985, Wolf duetted with Aretha Franklin on the track "Push" from her album Who's Zoomin' Who? and also appeared on the Artists United Against Apartheid song, "Sun City". In 1987, Wolf released his second solo album Come as You Are, with the title track notching Wolf another top-15 hit on the pop chart and a number one hit on the Mainstream Rock Chart. A later single "Can't Get Started" received radio play.

His album Long Line (1996) received four stars from Rolling Stone magazine. Long Line and Fool's Parade (1998) started his collaboration with singer/songwriter Kenny White producing. Sleepless (2002) featured guest appearances from Mick Jagger and Keith Richards and was highly praised by Rolling Stone as one of the 500 greatest albums of all time. Wolf has collaborated with Angelo Petraglia and long-time writing partner Will Jennings. Wolf's 2010 album Midnight Souvenirs won Album of the Year at the Boston Music Awards. On the album, Wolf performed duets with Shelby Lynne, Neko Case, and Merle Haggard. His eighth solo album, A Cure for Loneliness, was released in April 2016.

Wolf inducted Jackie Wilson and the Paul Butterfield Blues Band into the Rock and Roll Hall of Fame.

== Personal life ==
Wolf married actress Faye Dunaway in 1974. They divorced in 1979.

== Memoir ==
- Wolf, Peter (2025). Waiting on the Moon: Artists, Poets, Drifters, Grifters, and Goddesses. Little, Brown and Company. ISBN 9780316571722.

== Discography ==
=== Studio albums ===
List of albums, with selected details and chart positions
Title	Album details	Peak chart positions						Sales
Title	Album details	US	US Rock	US Folk	US Indie	AUS	SWE	Sales
Lights Out	Released: July 1984; Label: EMI America	24	—	—	—	94	17	
Come as You Are	Released: March 20, 1987; Label: EMI America	53	—	—	—	—	26	
Up to No Good	Released: February 19, 1990; Label: MCA	111	—	—	—	—	46	
Long Line	Released: May 14, 1996; Label: Reprise	—	—	—	—	—	—	
Fool's Parade	Released: September 29, 1998; Label: Mercury	—	—	—	—	—	—	
Sleepless	Released: September 10, 2002; Label: Artemis	—	—	—	39	—	—	
Midnight Souvenirs	Released: April 6, 2010; Label: Verve	45	12	—	—	—	—	US: 42,000
A Cure for Loneliness	Released: April 8, 2016; Label: Concord	144	18	5	—	—	—	
"—" denotes a recording that did not chart or was not released in that territory.

=== Singles ===
Year	Song	US Hot 100	US MSR	US Dance	AUS	CAN	Album
1984	"Lights Out"	12	6	11	46	15	Lights Out
1984	"I Need You Tonight"	36	22	-		85	Lights Out
1984	"Crazy"	-	26	-			Lights Out
1985	"Oo-Ee-Diddley-Bop!"	61	-				Lights Out
1987	"Come as You Are"	15	1	49	72	29	Come as You Are
1987	"Can't Get Started"	75	16	-			Come as You Are
1990	"99 Worlds"	77	9	-		56	Up to No Good
1996	"Long Line"	-	-	-			Long Line
1998	"Turnin' Pages"	-	-	-			Fool's Parade
2002	"Never Like This Before"	-	-	-			Sleepless
