= Recess (album) =

Studio album by Skrillex
- Released: March 14, 2014
- Recorded: 2013–2014
- Genres: EDM; dubstep; pop
- Length: 46:34
- Labels: Owsla; Big Beat; Atlantic
- Producers: Chance the Rapper; Diplo; Kill the Noise; KillaGraham; Alvin Risk; Skrillex; The Social Experiment

Skrillex chronology
Leaving (2013)	Recess (2014)	Skrillex and Diplo Present Jack Ü (2015)

Singles from Recess
- 1. "Try It Out" Released: October 14, 2013; 2. "Recess" Released: July 7, 2014; 3. "Ragga Bomb" Released: November 24, 2014; 4. "Dirty Vibe" Released: December 15, 2014

Recess is the debut studio album by American record producer Skrillex, initially released in Australia on March 14, 2014, and in Europe on March 17, 2014, by Owsla, Big Beat Records, and Atlantic Records. It was recorded between 2013 and 2014 whilst Skrillex was touring around the world.

Recess received mixed reviews from music critics. It charted in multiple countries worldwide and became his highest-charting release in the United States and the United Kingdom. Rolling Stone later ranked it at number 22 on their 50 Best Albums of 2014 list.

== Marketing ==
=== Promotion ===
On March 7, 2014, Skrillex took part in an "ask me anything" online Reddit post. To coincide with this question-and-answer session, his website was changed to redirect to a page featuring a talking alien face, based on the Apple emoji. "The face played short samples from album tracks when you clicked it." He released a mobile app, Alien Ride, on the same day which features an arcade-style objective where the spaceship has to destroy asteroids. The app displayed a countdown.

When the countdown reached zero, the first song from the album was available to stream through the app. This continued in regular 30 minute intervals until the entire album was streamable for a limited time via the app.

=== Singles ===
"All Is Fair in Love and Brostep"
A 30-second sample of "All is Fair in Love and Brostep" featuring the Ragga Twins. The first track from the album, it has charted in various countries.

"Try It Out (Neon Mix)" with Alvin Risk was released as the album's lead single on October 14, 2013, alongside two more mixes of the song. It charted in France at number 185. The title track, "Recess", was added to BBC Radio 1's C-List on March 19, 2014, and entered several countries' iTunes charts including the United States and United Kingdom. The song entered the UK Singles Chart at number 57 upon album release, and was released as a single alongside remixes on July 7, 2014. "Ease My Mind", "All Is Fair in Love and Brostep" and "Dirty Vibe" also entered the iTunes charts in various countries.

The music video for "Ragga Bomb" was released on April 1, 2014 and the song entered the Flanders Ultratip 100 at number 75. A remix EP entitled Ease My Mind v Ragga Bomb Remixes was released on November 24, 2014, with both songs doubling up as the single. "Dirty Vibe" was released as the album's fourth single in the form of another remix EP on December 15, 2014.

=== Other songs ===
"Doompy Poomp" was released on June 8, 2013, in collaboration with graphic designer Mishka for free download through his website. "Stranger" features on the Divergent soundtrack, released shortly before the album. The first song, "All Is Fair in Love and Brostep" debuted as a demo on his BBC Radio 1 Essential Mix. The song "Terror Squad" by electronic music producer Zomboy was inspired by the demo version known officially as "untitled DJ tool" or unofficially as "This Much Power". As a result, Skrillex used a sample from "Terror Squad" that says "It's fucking Zomboy", covering up the "Zomboy" with a distorted and pitched down laugh.

== Critical reception ==
Professional ratings
Aggregate scores
Source	Rating
Metacritic	59/100
Review scores
Source	Rating
AllMusic	3/5 stars
Consequence of Sound	C+
Fact	3/5 stars
Los Angeles Times	2.5/4 stars
Now	3/5 stars
Pitchfork	5.7/10
PopMatters	5/10
Resident Advisor	2/5
Rolling Stone	3.5/5 stars
Spin	7/10

According to the review aggregator Metacritic, Recess received "mixed or average reviews" based on a weighted average score of 59 out of 100 from 15 critic scores.

== Commercial performance ==
The album debuted at number four on the US Billboard 200 chart, with first week sales of 48,000 copies in the United States. As of January 2015, it has sold 150,000 copies.

== Track listing ==
Recess track listing
No.	Title	Writer(s)	Producer(s)	Length
1.	"All Is Fair in Love and Brostep" (featuring Ragga Twins)	Sonny Moore; Trevor and David Destouche; Joshua Mellody	Skrillex	4:08
2.	"Recess" (with Kill the Noise featuring Fatman Scoop and Michael Angelakos)	Moore; Jacob R. Stanczak; Isaac Freeman; Michael Angelakos	Skrillex; Kill the Noise	3:57
3.	"Stranger" (with KillaGraham featuring Sam Dew)	Moore; Justin Parker; Sam Dew; Graham Muron	Skrillex; KillaGraham	4:49
4.	"Try It Out" (Neon Mix; with Alvin Risk)	Moore; Marcio Alvarado	Skrillex; Alvin Risk	3:49
5.	"Coast Is Clear" (featuring Chance the Rapper and The Social Experiment)	Moore; Chancelor Bennett; Peter Wilkins; Nico Segal; Christopher Wallace; Ronald Isley; Ernie Isley; Chris Jasper	Skrillex; Chance the Rapper; The Social Experiment	4:03
6.	"Dirty Vibe" (with Diplo featuring G-Dragon and CL)	Moore; Thomas Pentz; Ji-Yong Kwon; Ted Hong Jun Park; Robin Cho	Skrillex; Diplo	3:26
7.	"Ragga Bomb" (featuring Ragga Twins)	Moore; T. Destouche; D. Destouche	Skrillex	4:18
8.	"Doompy Poomp"	Moore	Skrillex	3:25
9.	"Fuck That"	Moore	Skrillex	3:50
10.	"Ease My Mind" (featuring Niki & The Dove)	Moore; Malin Dahlström	Skrillex	5:02
11.	"Fire Away" (featuring Kid Harpoon)	Moore; Tom Hull	Skrillex	5:42
Total length:				46:34

Notes

- "Coast Is Clear" features additional vocals by Peter Cottontale and Donnie Trumpet.

Sample credits

- "All Is Fair in Love and Brostep" contains interpolations of "Terror Squad", written and performed by Zomboy.
- "Coast Is Clear" contains interpolations of "Big Poppa", written and performed by The Notorious B.I.G.
- "Ease My Mind" contains samples of "DJ, Ease My Mind", written and performed by Niki & The Dove.

== Charts ==
=== Weekly charts ===
Weekly chart performance for Recess
Chart (2014)	Peak position
Australian Albums (ARIA)	4
Austrian Albums (Ö3 Austria)	14
Belgian Albums (Ultratop Flanders)	28
Belgian Albums (Ultratop Wallonia)	38
Canadian Albums (Billboard)	3
Danish Albums (Hitlisten)	28
Dutch Albums (Album Top 100)	42
French Albums (SNEP)	57
Finnish Albums (Suomen virallinen lista)	20
German Albums (Offizielle Top 100)	28
Irish Albums (IRMA)	78
Italian Albums (FIMI)	30
Japanese Albums (Oricon)	24
New Zealand Albums (RMNZ)	6
Norwegian Albums (VG-lista)	22
Scottish Albums (Official Charts)	15
Spanish Albums (Promusicae)	45
Swedish Albums (Sverigetopplistan)	21
Swiss Albums (Schweizer Hitparade)	11
UK Albums (Official Charts)	13
UK Dance Albums (OCC)	1
UK Album Downloads (Official Charts)	3
US Billboard 200	4
US Top Dance Albums (Billboard)	1

=== Year-end charts ===
Year-end chart performance for Recess
Chart (2014)	Position
US Billboard 200	178
US Top Dance/Electronic Albums (Billboard)	5
Chart (2015)	Position
US Top Dance/Electronic Albums (Billboard)	21

== Certifications ==
Certifications for Recess
Region	Certification	Certified units/sales
Canada (Music Canada)	Gold	40,000^{‡}
^{‡} Sales+streaming figures based on certification alone.

== Release history ==
Release history and formats for Recess
Region	Date	Format	Label	Ref.
Australia	March 14, 2014	CD; digital download	Big Beat; Owsla; Atlantic	
Europe	March 17, 2014	CD; digital download	Big Beat; Owsla; Atlantic	
Various (Record Store Day exclusive)	April 20, 2014	Cassette	Big Beat; Owsla; Atlantic	
