= Reggae Owes Me Money =

Studio album by the Ragga Twins
- Released: 7 May 1991
- Studios: Von's Studio, North London
- Genres: Ragga; breakbeat hardcore; reggae fusion; jungle
- Length: 40:09
- Labels: Shut Up and Dance
- Producer: Shut Up & Dance

The Ragga Twins chronology
| Reggae Owes Me Money (1991) | Rinsin Lyrics (1995) |

Singles from Reggae Owes Me Money
- 1. "Ragga Trip" / "Hooligan 69" Released: 1990; 2. "Illegal Gunshot" / "Spliffhead" Released: 1990; 3. "Wipe the Needle" / "Juggling" Released: 1991; 4. "Hooligan 69" Released: 1991

Reggae Owes Me Money is the debut album by British duo the Ragga Twins, produced by hardcore duo Shut Up and Dance and released on the latter's record label of the same name in May 1991. After establishing themselves as dancehall artists from the Unity soundsystem in the 1980s, the Ragga Twins switched direction in the early 1990s, combining into a duo after signing to Shut Up & Dance's label. The production duo stirred the Ragga Twins' change in direction, fusing their previous reggae and dancehall style into the Shut Up & Dance rave dance music.

Aided by the release of several charting singles, Reggae Owes Me Money reached number 26 on the UK Albums Chart. Since its release, it has been recognised as a blueprint for jungle music, which built upon its usage of ragga, reggae basslines and breakbeats. Now hailed as a classic album, most of the album's material was re-released on the Ragga Twins Step Out compilation in 2008. Four years later, Fact ranked it 49th in their list of the best albums of the 1990s.

== Background ==
The Ragga Twins, consisting of brothers David and Trevor Destouche – known as Deman Rockers and Flinty Badman respectively, – began as MCs for Unity, a leading sound system in London. Throughout the 1980s, they separately released music on the soundsystem's Unity label, making digital dancehall music similar in style to labelmate King Jammy. The brothers stayed faithful to the label by turning down offers from other record companies to do "voice things". Nonetheless, they both left decided to leave Unity while at the Shinolas club in Hackney on New Year's Day 1990. The brothers felt that they had spent the 1980s "not going anywhere" and "not being brought into a studio." As a musician, Rockers wanted his music to be available for others to buy, but they felt there was little opportunity. He recalled: "I remember we played against Coxsone, and one of those guys told me if I was on their system I'd be in the studio every week! It was an easy decision to leave Unity and seek new opportunities. It was essential we left."

The brothers met Hackney-based breakbeat hardcore duo Shut Up & Dance, who also ran the label of the same name, when the latter duo contacted Deman Rockers to ask if they could sample his voice. The brothers had been signed to Unity as solo acts, but Shut Up & Dance suggested they sign them as a duo. Rockers later said that "SUAD have come up with a lot of great things, trust me, but this was perhaps their greatest achievement, getting us together as an act." Shut Up & Dance, and their productions for the label, were known for the infusion of hip hop into house music with sped up hip hop beats and reggae-esque basslines, alongside unlicensed samples and sound effects, resulting in a dark style of hardcore music popular in British illegal raves around 1990. By producing the Ragga Twins, the styles of both acts merged and introduced a "new, streetwise sound" to British raves. This marked a transition for the Ragga Twins from reggae soundsystems to hardcore and acid house parties where, previously unbeknown to the brothers, they had been revered since the late 1980s.

== Production and recording ==
Among the earliest records Shut Up & Dance produced for the Ragga Twins, "Ragga Trip" adapts lyrics Rockers had recorded for the reggae song "Hard Drugs," and criticised the excessive drug use at acid house parties. Subsequent singles were more hardcore in style and included "Spliffhead", "Hooligan 69", "Illegal Gunshot" and "Wipe the Needle." The duo's singles were enthusiastically received on the rave scene. According to music critic Sherman, the team-up between the Ragga Twins and Shut Up & Dance produced a distinctive London dance sound, rooted in ragga but faster and more frenetic, with bleep patterns, rough basslines and "creative" samples, adding that they had created an "underground sound that has seen them gain the utmost respect with almost all their releases."

For Reggae Owes Me Money, the Ragga Twins wanted to prove to Unity "what they could have had," and hence applied an energy and enthusiasm unseen in their Unity work. Flinty Badman recalled: "Back when we started as Ragga Twins it had to work... otherwise people would say, ‘Well, if reggae owes you money why did you leave in the first place?'." Shut Up & Dance produced the record, on which the aforementioned singles appear. Indeed, prior to production commencing, half of the material on the album already existed, having been issued as singles and B-sides; the remaining half was recorded over three days at Von's Studio in North London. According to Sherman, the quick work rate contributed to the overall raw sound of the album, which conjures up "the atmospherics of a dark little club, sweat pouring and the walls dripping, the crowd rocking to the soundtrack that the Ragga's let loose".

PJ, one half of Shut Up & Dance, commented that the quick production was ideal, believing that long exposure to loud music in the studio makes producers "lose the sensitivity" and forget the "fine detail"; similarly, the other half of the duo, Smiley, said that working on tracks for too long becomes tiring and makes them "lose the buzz in the studio". During production, Shut Up & Dance created instrumental tracks, usually without the presence of the Ragga Twins, who PJ said were "always late" and would often appear in the studio "just in time to put the vocals down". Rockers and Badman took PJ and Smiley's completed backing tracks home to practice and rehearse lyrics over them, marking a departure from their work with sound systems, where they would deejay lyrics instead. Badman commented that the studio afforded a "totally different feeling because you know in advance what you're going to do and what you're trying for." PJ would demand vocal retakes if he could not decipher the words, something Stu Lambert of Melody Maker credits as contributing to the album's "distinctive, very direct vocal sound".

== Composition ==
Music journalist Andrew Harrison described Reggae Makes Me Money as an abrasive fusion of ragga and house music, commenting how the Ragga Twins take Shut Up & Dance's style of 'massive' house beats and shameless sampling and moves it into "weird territory." He also felt the duo's unique style of toasting is more reminiscent of "the jambering of a wino than Shabba Ranks' slick chant." According to Lambert, the album's rhythm tracks constitute the record's biggest departure from Jamaican reggae productions, writing: "Between the initial selection of the sounds sampled from records but built up into their own beats, not looped, and the boxy, aggressive EQ, the drums are worlds apart from sundrenched Kingston backbeats." He commented that acid-style bass synth underpins most of the record, particularly on "Wipe the Needles", commenting that the record's sound textures, more than the compositions or lyrics, "conjure up London's boarded-up, grit-in-your-eyes edginess."

Sherman writes that the album touches on social issues, particularly on the opening song, "The Homeless Problem", which features the titular phrase being repeated, and "Illegal Gunshot", on which Badman criticises the emerging "gun-toting bad boy yout" persona in dancehall. Lambert compared the dark muttering of the phrase in "The Homeless Problem" to the work of Adrian Sherwood's Dub Syndicate, whose similarly tech-heavy sound marked a departure from Jamaican reggae production. One of the group's reappearing early singles, "Hooligan 69" begins with an unlicensed sample of the intro to Prince's "Let's Go Crazy", and was popular on dancefloors due to its heavy breakbeat and pulsating bassline. "Illegal Gunshot", meanwhile, applies a ragga chat atop a bouncy rhythm. A remix of "Spliffhead" fuses deep reggae with a style reminiscent of early Mantronix, while "Ragga Trip" is highlighted for its B-boy breakbeat and Roland TB-303 acid house bass. "Juggling" and "Wipe the Needle" feature toasting and boasting atop a classic break, anticipating the style of General Levy, whereas "18" Speaker" highlights the influence of dub on Shut Up & Dance's production style. "The Killing" is an anti-heroin song and samples "High Hopes" by the SOS Band."

== Release and reception ==
Professional ratings
Review scores
| Source | Rating |
|---|---|
| AllMusic | 4.5/5 stars |
| NME | 7/10 |
| Select | 3/5 stars |

The Ragga Twins named the album Reggae Owes Me Money in reference to how they felt they had put so much work into creating reggae music and were not being rewarded for it, commenting that "reggae will always be our first loved music." Dave Jenkins of International DJ Mag elaborated: "It wasn't an ironic or humorous title: after investing 10 years of soundsystem graft and deejay craft with London's Unity Sound, they felt they weren't getting the studio breaks they saw contemporaries such as Tippa Irie or Papa Levi enjoying."

Reggae Owes Me Money was released on 7 May 1991. On 1 June, the album debuted and peaked number 26 on the UK Albums Chart, staying on the chart for five weeks, including two weeks in the top 40. The record also topped the Music Week Dance Albums chart for two weeks, prompting Von's, the studio it was recorded at, to print a congratulations message in Music Week. The reused singles "Ragga Trip" and "Illegal Gunshot" had already charted on the UK Singles Chart in 1990, peaking at numbers 76 and 51 respectively. In April 1991, a double A-side of "Wipe the Needle" and "Juggling" reached number 71, despite being predicted by chart sources to be the first ragga single to enter the top 40, while "Hooligan 69" reached number 56 in July.

In a contemporary review for Select, Andrew Harrison highlighted the "weird" sound of the material, and commented that the "Ragga Twins are hit-and-miss exponents of the club 12-inch, so it's for the best that Reggae Owes Me Money is more of a greatest hits package than a genuine debut." He did however feel that the Ragga Twins' "ragga-House" style was more difficult to digest in album form than on twelve-inch singles, describing the record as "[v]ery hardcore indeed, and sometimes enough to make producers SUAD themselves sound mainstream." In his review for NME, Sherman praised the Ragga Twins for being unafraid to "show where they stand and make their voices heard". He highlighted the record's sound, rawness, and social themes "that many others would not have the courage to include in their search for the stars," concluding that the album "isn't a normal recording," but rather "two angry and frustrated men kicking their way out of your speaker boxes but doing it in a way that helps to wipe off some of the tar that has been brushed over the Ragga scene." In his article for Melody Maker, Lambert wrote that: "The recognisable dancehall antecedents of Flinty and Demon's vocals, cut up to fit Shut Up and Dance's rewrite-the-book hip hop style, is the most convincing and thought-provoking reggae fusion yet."

== Legacy ==
"When people talk about the switch from reggae to jungle, they would always mention Ragga Twins."

— Flinty Badman

By fusing the Ragga Twins' reggae with Shut Up & Dance's production style, Reggae Owes Me Money became a blueprint for jungle music, a genre defined by its usage of basslines, breakbeats and ragga, and which Dan Kuper of the New Statesman describes as the first authentic British dance music genre and a direct ancestor to UK garage, grime and dubstep. In the 2018 documentary Bass, Beat and Bars, Flint Badman recalled the album as the link between reggae and jungle, "because it had us doing the reggae chatting, it added the fast sped up breaks, and it blended the two genres together, which now we call jungle." Joe Patrin of Pitchfork wrote that "the Ragga Twins' 1990-92 output, which comprised the majority of their career work until their mid-aughts comeback, lacks the 150+ BPM pace and "Amen" break-chopping most obviously identified with the [jungle] genre by 1994. But it was a solid prototype."

English MC Rodney P hailed the album as a "landmark", while Joe Muggs of Fact considers it a "classic album." In 2012, Fact ranked it at number 49 in their list of "The 100 Best Albums of the 1990s", describing it as a "magmatic fondue of acid house, breakbeat and dancehall that could only have existed at the dawn of the 90s" and adding that, unlike Silver Bullet, the Ragga Twins mastered the blend. Influential blogger Matt Woebot placed the album at number 7 on his list of the "100 Greatest Records Ever," calling it "the best record to emerge out of the UK acid house scene… it's also, by default, the best record to come out of the UK's Dancehall scene. And the best Grime LP ever!" Patrin acknowledged its placement in the list as an attempt to trying to rectify the Ragga Twins' standing as innovators, as the duo had become overlooked in the music media. In 2008, Soul Jazz Records released the compilation Ragga Twins Step Out, which includes all the songs from Reggae Makes Me Money with the exception of "Hooligan 69", due to Prince refusing the sample. However, the vinyl version of the compilation features a remix of the song without the Prince sample.

== Track listing ==
All songs written by Shut Up & Dance (PJ & Smiley) and the Ragga Twins

1. "Intro" – 0:51
2. "The Homeless Problem" – 3:58
3. "Illegal Gunshot" – 4:02
4. "Love Talk" – 3:39
5. "Hooligan 69" – 4:05
6. "Spliffhead Remix" – 4:04
7. "The Killing" – 3:57
8. "Wipe the Needle" – 3:54
9. "Ragga Trip" – 4:37
10. "18" Speaker" – 3:45
11. "Juggling" – 3:10

== Personnel ==
Adapted from the liner notes of Reggae Owes Me Money

- The Ragga Twins – lyrics
- Shut Up & Dance – conception, production, arrangements, executive production
- James SK Wān - engineering
