= DJ, Ease My Mind =

2012 single by Niki & The Dove

Single by Niki & the Dove

from the album Instinct
- Released: 24 February 2012
- Length: 3:21
- Label: TEN; Sub Pop; Mercury
- Songwriter: Malin Dahlström
- Producers: Elof Loelv; Malin Dahlström; Gustaf Karlöf

Niki & the Dove singles chronology
| "The Fox" (2011) | "DJ, Ease My Mind" (2012) | "Tomorrow" (2012) |

"DJ, Ease My Mind" is a single by Swedish recording group Niki & the Dove, from their debut studio album Instinct.

== Music video ==
A music video to accompany the release of "DJ, Ease My Mind" was first released onto YouTube on 13 December 2011 at a total length of four minutes and fifteen seconds.

== Skrillex version ==
"Ease My Mind"

Song by Skrillex featuring Niki & the Dove

from the album Recess
- Released: March 14, 2014
- Genre: Dubstep; drumstep; trap; ambient
- Length: 5:02
- Label: Big Beat; Owsla; Atlantic; Asylum
- Songwriters: Sonny Moore; Malin Dahlström
- Producer: Skrillex

A remixed version of the song by American record producer Skrillex, titled "Ease My Mind", was released as the penultimate track of Skrillex's debut studio album Recess (2014). The song was featured on an animated film clip titled Josho, which was directed by David D. Navarro (better known as Roboto) and published to YouTube by Collide Film Studio on September 30, 2015. Two additional remixes by Jai Wolf and GTA were released on an EP entitled Ease My Mind v Ragga Bomb Remixes on November 24, 2014.

== Track listing ==
Digital download

1. "DJ, Ease My Mind" (Radio Edit) – 3:21
2. "DJ, Ease My Mind" (Jakwob Remix) – 3:17
3. "DJ, Ease My Mind" (Seamus Haji Remix) – 7:00
4. "DJ, Ease My Mind" (Tom's Dove Tail Remix) – 6:43
5. "DJ, Ease My Mind" (Twin Shadow Remix) – 2:49

== Chart performance ==
Chart performance for "DJ, Ease My Mind"
| Chart (2012) | Peak position |
|---|---|
| UK Singles (Official Charts Company) | 103 |

== Release history ==
Release history for "DJ, Ease My Mind"
| Region | Date | Format | Label |
|---|---|---|---|
| United Kingdom | 24 February 2012 | Digital download | TEN; Sub Pop; Mercury |
