= Recess (song) =

Single by Skrillex and Kill the Noise featuring Fatman Scoop and Michael Angelakos

from the album Recess
- Released: July 7, 2014
- Genre: Dubstep; moombahton
- Length: 3:57
- Label: Big Beat; Owsla; Atlantic; Asylum
- Songwriter(s): Sonny Moore; Jake Stanczak; Isaac Freeman; Michael Angelakos
- Producer(s): Skrillex; Kill the Noise

Skrillex singles chronology
"Ragga Bomb" (2014)	"Recess" (2014)	"Take Ü There" (2014)

Kill the Noise singles chronology
"Lightspeed" (2012)	"Recess" (2014)	"Shell Shocked" (2014)

Fatman Scoop singles chronology
"Rock the Boat" (2011)	"Recess" (2014)	"Don't Stop the Madness" (2014)

Michael Angelakos singles chronology
"Recess" (2014)

Audio sample
- "Recess": file; help

"Recess" is a song by American record producers Skrillex and Kill the Noise, featuring vocals from Fatman Scoop and Passion Pit frontman Michael Angelakos. It was released on March 14, 2014, as part of Skrillex's debut studio album Recess (2014). It entered the UK Singles Chart at number 57 after being added to BBC Radio 1's rotation. On May 15, 2014, the song was confirmed as the album's second single. Soon after, a teaser video for the single was released on Skrillex's YouTube channel on July 3, 2014. The song was released as a single on July 7, 2014, alongside remixes from Flux Pavilion, Milo and Otis, Valentino Khan and Ape Drums.

== Formats and track listings ==
CD single and digital download
No.	Title	Length
1.	"Recess"	3:57

Digital download – EP
No.	Title	Length
1.	"Recess" (Milo and Otis Remix)	4:55
2.	"Recess" (Valentino Khan Remix)	3:33
3.	"Recess" (Ape Drums Remix)	4:19
4.	"Recess" (Flux Pavilion Remix)	3:47
Total length:		16:34

== Credits and personnel ==
- Sonny "Skrillex" Moore – production
- Jake "Kill the Noise" Stanczak – production
- Isaac "Fatman Scoop" Freeman – vocals
- Michael Angelakos – vocals

== Charts ==
=== Weekly charts ===
Chart (2014)	Peak position
Australia (ARIA)	47
Austria (Ö3 Austria Top 40)	69
Belgium (Ultratip Bubbling Under Flanders)	25
Belgium Dance (Ultratop Flanders)	43
Canada (Canadian Hot 100)	59
France (SNEP)	189
Germany (GfK)	79
UK Dance (OCC)	17
UK Singles (OCC)	57
US Bubbling Under Hot 100 (Billboard)	6
US Hot Dance/Electronic Songs (Billboard)	13
US Hot Singles Sales (Billboard)	1

=== Year-end charts ===
Chart (2014)	Position
US Hot Dance/Electronic Songs (Billboard)	37
