= The Rainy Season =

Studio album by Marc Cohn
- Released: May 25, 1993
- Studio: Quad Recording, New York City
- Genre: Folk rock, alternative country
- Length: 45:21
- Label: Atlantic
- Producer: Marc Cohn, John Leventhal, Ben Wisch

Marc Cohn chronology
Marc Cohn (1991)	The Rainy Season (1993)	Burning the Daze (1998)

Professional ratings
Review scores
Source	Rating
AllMusic	3/5 stars
Music Week	3/5 stars

The Rainy Season is the second studio album by American singer-songwriter Marc Cohn, released in 1993. The album peaked at number 63 on the Billboard 200 chart and at number 24 on the UK charts.

== Track listing ==
All tracks written by Marc Cohn, except where noted.

No.	Title	Writer(s)	Length
1.	"Walk Through the World"	Marc Cohn, John Leventhal	4:56
2.	"Rest for the Weary"		5:08
3.	"The Rainy Season"		4:47
4.	"Mama's in the Moon"		2:17
5.	"Don't Talk to Her at Night"		3:03
6.	"Paper Walls"		4:25
7.	"From the Station"		3:07
8.	"Medicine Man"		4:29
9.	"Baby King"		3:10
10.	"She's Becoming Gold"		5:31
11.	"The Things We've Handed Down"		4:41

== Personnel ==
Adapted from the album's liner notes.

- Marc Cohn – vocals, acoustic piano (1, 3, 7, 10), acoustic guitar (2, 4–6, 8), melodica (7), electric piano (11), keyboards (11)
- Benmont Tench – Hammond organ (1, 2, 8), acoustic piano (2, 6), Wurlitzer electric piano (8)
- John Leventhal – guitars (1, 5, 10), electric guitar (2, 3, 6, 8), bouzouki (2, 5), mandolin (2, 4), Hammond organ (3, 6, 7, 11), keyboards (4, 5, 8, 11), slide guitar (4), bass (5, 7), percussion (5, 7, 8), harmonica (6), acoustic guitar (7), Wurlitzer electric piano (9), nylon string guitar (11)
- Bonnie Raitt – slide guitar (3), vocals (3)
- Larry Campbell – pedal steel guitar (7), violin (7)
- James "Hutch" Hutchinson – bass guitar (1–3, 6, 8)
- Zev Katz – upright bass (10)
- Jim Keltner – drums (1–3, 6, 8, 9)
- Dennis McDermott – drums (5)
- Mike Mainieri – marimbas (4), vibraphone (4)
- Mino Cinélu – udu (4), percussion (8)
- Arto Tuncboyaciyan – percussion (10)
- Glen Velez – percussion (10)
- Jack Bashkow – baritone saxophone (1, 3)
- Adam Kolker – baritone saxophone (2, 10)
- Rick Depofi – tenor saxophone (1–3, 10), horn arrangements (1)
- Aaron Heick – tenor saxophone (1)
- Bob Malach – tenor saxophone (3)
- Larry Farrell – trombone (1, 3)
- Chris Botti – trumpet (3)
- Wardell Quezergue – horn arrangements (3)
- Catherine Russell – backing vocals (1, 3)
- Ada Dyer – backing vocals (3)
- Diva Gray – backing vocals (3)
- Sweet Pea Atkinson – backing vocals (6, 9)
- Harry Bowens – backing vocals (6, 9)
- Terry Evans – backing vocals (6, 9)
- Arnold McCuller – backing vocals (6, 9)
- David Crosby – harmony vocals (7, 10)
- Graham Nash – harmony vocals (7, 10)
- David Hidalgo – harmony vocals (8)
- Willie Greene Jr. – backing vocals (9)

== Production ==
- Marc Cohn – producer
- John Leventhal – producer
- Ben Wisch – producer, recording, mixing
- Dave Hecht – assistant engineer
- Matt Knobel – assistant engineer
- Ted Jensen – mastering at Sterling Sound (New York, NY)
- Jill Dell'Abate – production coordinator
- Richard Bates – art direction, design
- Melodie McDaniel – photography
- David Spagnolo – photography
