= Join the Parade =

Studio album by Marc Cohn
- Released: October 9, 2007
- Recorded: Various
- Genre: Folk rock Alt-Country
- Length: 46:48
- Label: Decca
- Producer: Marc Cohn; Charlie Sexton

Marc Cohn chronology
Burning the Daze (1998)	Join the Parade (2007)	Listening Booth: 1970 (2010)

Professional ratings
Review scores
Source	Rating
AllMusic	4/5 stars

Join the Parade is the fourth studio album by American singer-songwriter Marc Cohn, released in 2007.

An MP3 version of the album was released on iTunes on September 25, 2007, and contained the bonus track "You're a Shadow", which is not on the studio release.

The first track off the album, "Listening to Levon", was released as a promotional single, and received some airplay on WYEP-FM.

A making of "Join the Parade" video was released by Decca Records on Amazon Music, and features Cohn talking about the process of producing the album. He also discusses topics that influenced many of the songs, Hurricane Katrina, and the near-death experience of being shot in the head in a failed carjacking attempt while on tour.

== Track listing ==
All tracks written by Marc Cohn, except where noted.

No.	Title	Writer(s)	Length
1.	"Listening to Levon"		4:48
2.	"The Calling (Ghost of Charlie Christian)"		4:55
3.	"Dance Back from the Grave"	Marc Cohn, Rick Bragg	4:44
4.	"If I Were an Angel"		5:52
5.	"Let Me Be Your Witness"	Marc Cohn, Kenny White	4:32
6.	"Live Out the String"	Marc Cohn, Michael Silverstone	4:23
7.	"Giving Up the Ghost"	Marc Cohn, John Leventhal	3:45
8.	"Join the Parade"	Marc Cohn, Malcolm Burn, Kevin Salem	4:33
9.	"My Sanctuary"		5:51
10.	"Life Goes On"		3:49

iTunes bonus track
No.	Title	Length
11.	"You're a Shadow"	4:36

== Personnel ==
- Marc Cohn – lead vocals, acoustic piano (1, 5, 6, 8–10), acoustic guitar (2, 3), keyboards (4), drum machine (4), tack piano (9)
- Benmont Tench – organ (1, 5, 6), keyboards (2), Hammond organ (2), Wurlitzer electric piano (5, 6)
- Patrick Warren – pump organ (2, 9), Chamberlin (2, 9), keyboards (3, 4, 7, 9)
- Kenny White – Wurlitzer electric piano (4)
- David Barrett – Mellotron (4)
- Malcolm Burn – keyboards (8), guitars (8), percussion (8)
- Charlie Sexton – acoustic guitar (1, 3, 5, 10), 12-string acoustic guitar (1), electric guitar (1–3), steel guitar (1), drums (1, 3), harmony vocals (1, 5), acoustic piano (2), loops (2), backing vocals (2, 6, 8), 6-string bass (3), percussion (3, 5, 8, 9), keyboards (5), baritone guitar (5), bass guitar (5, 6, 8), cello (5, 7), violin (5), guitars (6–8), 12-string guitar (6), slide guitar (6, 10), Leslie guitar (7), live guitar loops (7), bouzouki (7, 9), Wurlitzer electric piano (8), pump organ bass (9), resonator guitar (9), electric upright bass (9)
- Danny Kortchmar – guitars (4)
- Bill Dillon – guitars (8)
- Shane Fontayne – Fender 6-string bass guitar (1, 6), guitars (2, 4), tremolo guitar (3), acoustic guitar (5), National guitar (7), baritone guitar (9)
- Jennifer Condos – bass guitar (1, 2, 4–6)
- Sebastian Steinberg – acoustic bass (3), electric upright bass (7)
- Greg Cohen – acoustic bass (10)
- Jay Bellerose – drums (2, 3, 5, 7, 9)
- Jim Keltner – drums (2–5, 7, 9)
- Jerome Smith – trombone (3, 9)
- Ephraim Owens – trumpet solo (2), trumpet (3), flugelhorn (9)
- Tosca String Quartet – strings (10)
- Stephen Barber – string arrangements (10)
- Paulette McWilliams – backing vocals (2, 5)
- Cindy Mizelle – backing vocals (1)
- Charley Drayton – backing vocals (2, 8), drums (6, 8, 10)
- Amy Helm – backing vocals (3)
- Rose Stone – backing vocals (3)
- The Holmes Brothers – backing vocals (4, 9)
- Sharon Bryant – backing vocals (5)
- Shelby Lynne – backing vocals (5), harmony vocals (7)
- N'Dea Davenport – backing vocals (8)

== Production ==
- Marc Cohn – producer
- Charlie Sexton – producer
- Brad Bell – engineer, editing
- Joe Blaney – engineer, mixing (1–3, 5–10)
- Kyle Crushman – engineer, editing
- T.J. Doherty – engineer
- Philip Hill – engineer, editing
- Jim Scott – engineer, mixing (4)
- Jared Tuten – engineer, editing
- Matthew Gill – assistant engineer
- Slick Johnson – assistant engineer
- Steve Rhodes – assistant engineer, editing
- Niko Bolas – additional engineer (4)
- Kevin Halpin – additional engineer (4)
- Joe Gastwirt – mastering at Gastwirt Mastering
- Tom Arndt – package coordinator
- Pat Barry – art direction
- Richard Frankel – art direction, package design
- Leonard Freed – cover photography
- Myriam Santos-Kayda – photography
- Jean Marie Kearney – styling assistant
