= Ragga Twins Step Out =

Compilation album by Ragga Twins
- Released: June 30, 2008
- Label: Soul Jazz
- Producer: Shut Up and Dance, Ribs
- Compiler: Stuart Baker

Ragga Twins Step Out is a 2008 compilation album by The Ragga Twins.

== Release ==
Ragga Twins Step Out was released by Soul Jazz Records on June 30, 2008, on CD and vinyl.

== Release and reception ==
Professional ratings
Review scores
Source	Rating
AllMusic	4.5/5 stars
The Guardian	4/5 stars
The Montreal Gazette	3.5/5 stars
Pitchfork Media	8.5/10
XLR8R	8/10

Dorian Lynskey of The Guardian gave the album a four out of five rating, proclaiming that the duo "flaunt their skills on Juggling bug Shut Up and Dance atmospheric, ingenious production means that the virtually instrumental "Spliffhead (Remix)" and "The Homeless Problem" are no less gripping." A review in The Montreal Gazette gave the album a three and a half out of five rating, finding that the album "sounds dated now, but shows the great way they mashed up the worlds of dancehall reggae and club culture, forging a path to jungle, 2step, grime and beyond." Melissa Bradshaw of Plan B noted the album was only a near-complete collection of Ragga Twins tracks, noting the absence of tracks like "Hooligan 69" which was described as being "blatant plagiarism of Prince's "Let's Go Crazy"" and declared the album as reminding "us just how seminal [The Ragga Twins] were. And the music is spinetingly good." David Dacks of Exclaim! praised the album, stating that "this comp proves that the punk-like simplicity and excitement of their singular album from 1991 and other contemporary tracks were a milestone in dance music. This music is still terrifically exciting. "

== Track listing ==
Track listing adapted from back of album sleeve and liner notes. All track composed by Smiley, PJ, Deman Rockers, and Flinty Badman except where noted.

No.	Title	Credited Performer	Length
1.	"Ragga Trip"	Ragga Twins	4:36
2.	"Illegal Gunshots"	Ragga Twins	4:00
3.	"Spliff Head (Remix)"	Ragga Twins	4:04
4.	"Love Talk"	Ragga Twins	3:39
5.	"The Homeless Problem"	Ragga Twins	3:57
6.	"Rudeboy"	Ragga Twins	3:52
7.	"18" Speakers"	Ragga Twins	3:41
8.	"Tan So Black"	Ragga Twins	3:52
9.	"Bring Up the Mic Some More"	Ragga Twins	5:47

No.	Title	Writer(s)	Credited Performer	Length
1.	"Juggling"		Ragga Twins	3:11
2.	"Spliffhead (Original)"		Ragga Twins	4:22
3.	"Hard Drugs"	Deman Rockers	Deman Rockers	3:28
4.	"Shine Eye"	Michael Rose, Derrick Simpson	Ragga Twins featuring Junior Reid	5:18
5.	"Wipe the Needle"		Ragga Twins	3:57
6.	"Iron Lady"	Rockers	Deman Rockers	2:21
7.	"Good Times"	Smiley, PJ, Flinty Badman, Richie Davis	Ragga Twins featuring Ritchie Davis	4:46
8.	"The Truth"		Ragga Twins	4:44
9.	"Hooligan 69 (Shut Up and Dance Remix)"		Ragga Twins

== Credits ==
Credits adapted from the liner notes.

- Stuart Baker - compiler, sleeve notes
- Adrian Self - sleeve design
- Dino St. Wye - sleeve design
- Pete Reilly - mastering
- Duncan Cowell - mastering
- Aki/Retna Pictures - photography
- Paul Massey - photography
- Adrian Fisk - photography
- Stefan De Batselier - photography
- Shut Up and Dance - producer (all tracks except "Hard Drugs" and "Iron Lady")
- Ribs - producer (on "Hard Drugs" and "Iron Lady")
