= Walking in Memphis =

1991 single by Marc Cohn

Single by Marc Cohn

from the album Marc Cohn
- B-side: "Dig Down Deep"; "Silver Thunderbird" (live) (reissue)
- Released: March 1991
- Genre: Soft rock; pop
- Length: 4:18
- Label: Atlantic
- Songwriter: Marc Cohn
- Producers: Marc Cohn; Ben Wisch

Marc Cohn singles chronology
"The Heart of the City" (1986)	"Walking in Memphis" (1991)	"Silver Thunderbird" (1991)

Music video
- "Walking in Memphis" on YouTube

"Walking in Memphis" is a song written and originally recorded by American singer-songwriter Marc Cohn and released as a single in March 1991 by Atlantic Records.

The song's lyrics are autobiographical. They chronicle a trip that Cohn, then a struggling songwriter and singer, took to Memphis to overcome a bout of writer's block. After visiting the church where former soul singer Al Green was preaching, Elvis Presley's former home of Graceland, and a small nightclub in nearby Mississippi, he returned to New York and began composing the song.

"Walking in Memphis" reached number 13 on the US Billboard Hot 100 chart in 1991. The song reached number three in Canada, number seven in Ireland, and number 11 in Australia. It received a Song of the Year nomination at the 34th Annual Grammy Awards in 1992, the same year that the 32-year-old Cohn won the Grammy Award for Best New Artist. "Walking in Memphis" is Cohn's signature song. The song has been covered several times, notably in 1995 by Cher and in 2003 by Lonestar.

== Inspiration ==
Cohn has said that "Walking in Memphis" is "100 percent autobiographical". He has described it as a song about "a Jewish gospel-music-lover", and added that "the song is about more than just a place; it's about a kind of spiritual awakening, one of those trips where you're different when you leave." He was inspired to write "Walking in Memphis" by a 1985 visit to the Memphis, Tennessee, area. At the time, he was working as a session singer in New York City while pursuing a recording contract. In 2014, he recalled:

One night while listening to all of my demos, I came to the realization that I shouldn't be signed, because I didn't have any great songs yet. ... I was 28 years old and not in love with my songs. James Taylor had written 'Fire and Rain' when he was 18, and Jackson Browne wrote 'These Days' when he was only 17. I thought: 'I'm already ten years older than these geniuses. It's never going to happen for me.' So it was a pretty desperate time, and I went to Memphis with that struggle at the forefront of my mind.

After reading that James Taylor overcame writer's block by going to a place he had never been, Cohn visited Memphis.

A friend had told him "there were two things in particular that I had to do [in Memphis], things that would forever change me. They later became the centerpieces of 'Walking in Memphis'." Cohn added: "The first thing was go to the Full Gospel Tabernacle Church on a Sunday morning to hear the Reverend Al Green preach. ... I [soon] had chills running up and down my spine. The service was so deeply moving that I found myself with sweat running down my face and tears in my eyes, totally enveloped by everything I was seeing and hearing [...] Al Green's service was one of the great experiences of my life."

The second piece of advice was that Cohn visit the Hollywood Café in Robinsonville, Mississippi (present-day Tunica Resorts, 35 miles south of Memphis), to see Muriel Davis Wilkins, a retired schoolteacher who performed at the cafe on Friday nights. Cohn remembered:

When I arrived, Muriel, who ... was in her 60s, was onstage playing a beat-up old upright piano and singing gospel standards ... I felt an immediate connection to her voice, her spirit, her face, and her smile. I was totally transfixed by her music. While many of the patrons were busy eating and not paying close attention to Muriel, I couldn't take my eyes off her. During her breaks, the two of us would talk.

Cohn also described his conversations with Wilkins that evening, including discussion of his mother's death during his childhood, an event he had emotionally grappled with his entire life. Wilkins invited Cohn to sing a few songs, including the traditional hymn "Amazing Grace", an event he found deeply moving.

== Composition ==
Soon after returning to New York City, Cohn began constructing the melody for "Walking in Memphis" on his guitar:

The music for 'Walking in Memphis', except for the bridge, is really just the same thing over and over again. It's an attempt to keep things simple so that the narrative is what the listener focuses on. The story keeps changing; it goes from one scenario to another, all following the thread of my elation, described in the lyric 'Walking with my feet ten feet off of Beale'. What's being expressed is my love of music and the spiritual transformation I've always felt through it.

Cohn did not think the song worked on the guitar and so switched to his piano, at which point the process started to flow. In an interview with Songwriting Magazine, Cohn said while working on "Walking in Memphis" he felt as if he'd "turned a corner as a songwriter" and was confident in the song's structure beginning with vocals and piano and slowly adding the full band before returning to vocals and piano for the conclusion.

Cohn mentions Muriel Wilkins:

Now Muriel plays piano every Friday at the Hollywood
And they brought me down to see her and they asked me if I would
Do a little number, and I sang with all my might
She said "Tell me are you a Christian child?" I said "Ma’am I am tonight."

In 2014, Cohn noted:

The line: 'Tell me are you a Christian child, and I said 'Ma'am I am tonight' – even in the moment I wrote it down, I knew I was getting closer to finding my songwriting voice. To this day, people still ask me if I am a Christian. While I have to admit that I enjoy the confusion the lyric brings, the thing that makes that line work is the fact that I'm a Jew. So many great artists over the years needed to hide the fact that they were Jewish to protect themselves and their families from anti-Semitism, so I'm proud of the fact that I could come right out and practically announce my religion on the first song I ever released.

In 1986, Cohn returned to the Hollywood Café to play "Walking in Memphis" and the other songs from his new album for Wilkins. After he finished, Wilkins said, "'You know the one where you mention me at the end? That's the best one you got!'" She died in October 1990, just before Cohn released "Walking in Memphis".

== Critical reception ==
Pan-European magazine Music & Media described "Walking in Memphis" as "an inspiring song about the capitol of rock & roll, by this promising American singer/songwriter who is backed by an impressive gospel choir." Bobby Surf from NME said the song is "the Tennessee Tourist Board's wettest dream come true". He added, "To conclude that 'Walking in Memphis' is a mite similar to fellow pop hagiographers Danny Wilson's "Mary's Prayer" is to do Cohn a serious disservice. Firstly, he has a fine, grown up voice and a manner at the piano that mercifully skirts the morbid pomposity composing at that instrument so often engenders."

== Commercial performance ==
Released as the first single from Cohn's self-titled debut album in March 1991, "Walking in Memphis" debuted at number 87 on the US Hot 100 in Billboard magazine dated March 30, 1991, with a subsequent two-month gradual chart ascent to the top 40. The single's number 38 ranking on the Hot 100 dated May 25, 1991, inaugurated a ten-week top 40 tenure with a peak of number 13 for two weeks in July 1991. Overall, "Walking in Memphis" spent 23 weeks on the Hot 100. "Walking in Memphis" was also a hit on Billboard's Adult Contemporary chart (number 12) and crossed-over to the magazine's Hot Country Singles & Tracks chart (number 74). In Canada, the song peaked at number three on the week dated July 13, 1991.

During its original release, "Walking in Memphis" reached number seven in Ireland but stalled at number 66 in the UK singles chart; its September 1991 re-release returned "Walking in Memphis" to the Irish top 20 at number 16 and introduced the single to the UK top 30 with a peak of number 22. (The re-release of "Walking in Memphis" replaced the original B-side, "Dig Down Deep", with a live version of "Silver Thunderbird" recorded July 17, 1991.) "Walking in Memphis" was also a top-twenty hit in both Australia and New Zealand, with chart peaks of number 11 and 18. In Europe, the single charted in France (number 45), Germany (number 25), the Netherlands (number 54), and Sweden (number 36).

At the 34th Grammy Awards in February 1992, "Walking in Memphis" was nominated for Song of the Year. Also, Cohn was nominated for the Best Pop Male Vocalist award for his vocals in "Walking in Memphis". Cohn did not win either award, although he did win the Grammy for Best New Artist.

"Walking in Memphis" is Cohn's signature song.

== Track listings and formats ==
- 7-inch single (first UK release)
1. "Walking in Memphis" – 4:18
2. "Dig Down Deep" – 5:08
- 7-inch single (second UK release)
1. "Walking in Memphis" – 4:18
2. "Silver Thunderbird" (live) – 5:26
- CD maxi
1. "Walking in Memphis" – 4:18
2. "Dig Down Deep" – 5:08
3. "Saving the Best for Last" – 5:31

== Charts ==
=== Weekly charts ===
Chart (1991–1992)	Peak position
Australia (ARIA)	11
Canada Top Singles (RPM)	3
Canada Adult Contemporary (RPM)	7
Europe (Eurochart Hot 100)	35
Europe (European Hit Radio)	19
France (SNEP)	45
Germany (GfK)	25
Ireland (IRMA)	7
Luxembourg (Radio Luxembourg)	5
Netherlands (Single Top 100)	56
New Zealand (Recorded Music NZ)	18
Sweden (Sverigetopplistan)	36
UK Singles (Official Charts)	66
UK Singles (Official Charts); Re-release	22
UK Airplay (Music Week)	8
US Billboard Hot 100	13
US Adult Contemporary (Billboard)	12
US Album Rock Tracks (Billboard)	7
US Hot Country Singles & Tracks (Billboard)	74
US Cash Box Top 100	11

=== Year-end charts ===
Chart (1991)	Position
Australia (ARIA)	82
Canada Top Singles (RPM)	35
Canada Adult Contemporary (RPM)	23
Germany (Media Control)	86
US Album Rock Tracks (Billboard)	42

== Certifications ==
Region	Certification	Certified units/sales
Denmark (IFPI Danmark)	Platinum	90,000^{‡}
New Zealand (RMNZ)	2× Platinum	60,000^{‡}
United Kingdom (BPI)	Platinum	600,000^{‡}
^{‡} Sales+streaming figures based on certification alone.

== Cher version ==
"Walking in Memphis"

Single by Cher

from the album It's a Man's World
- B-side: "Angels Running"
- Released: October 16, 1995
- Genre: Pop rock
- Length: 3:59
- Label: WEA
- Songwriter: Marc Cohn
- Producer: Christopher Neil

Cher singles chronology
"Love Can Build a Bridge" (1995)	"Walking in Memphis" (1995)	"One by One" (1996)

Music video
- "Walking in Memphis (Director's Cut)" on YouTube

=== Background ===
"Walking in Memphis" was remade by American singer and actress Cher for her 21st studio album, It's a Man's World (1995). It was produced by Christopher Neil and released as the album's lead single in the United Kingdom on October 16, 1995, by WEA. Her version debuted at number 11 on the UK Singles chart for the week ending October 28, 1995, with this ultimately proving its peak position.

Although largely faithful to the original, Cher's version replaces the female piano player referenced, Muriel, with a male player, Gabriel, with the line "Ma'am, I am [a Christian] tonight" amended to "Man, I am tonight" accordingly. Additionally, Cohn's repetition of the first verse is largely omitted, being replaced with a repetition of the first line, "Put on my blue suede shoes", only.

"Walking in Memphis" was included in the set list for Cher's 1999–2000 Do You Believe? Tour, the first Cher tour subsequent to her recording of the song. In introducing the number, Cher would overstate how unsuccessful her version of "Walking in Memphis" was, citing Cohn's original as "a huge hit" and calling her own version "a huge bomb". Her cover was used on The X-Files in the final scene of the fifth-season episode "The Post-Modern Prometheus".

=== Critical reception ===
AllMusic described Cher's cover version of "Walking in Memphis" as "rousing". Jim Farber from Entertainment Weekly stated that it "must be heard to be believed." Pan-European magazine Music & Media wrote, "The regular version of Marc Cohn's low key ballad doesn't do much justice to Cher's throaty voice, which needs more drama."

=== Live performances ===
- Do You Believe? Tour
- The Farewell Tour (sung on the fifth, sixth, seventh, eighth and the ninth leg of the tour)
- Cher at the Colosseum
- Dressed to Kill Tour
- Classic Cher
- Here We Go Again Tour

=== Track listings ===
- European cassette and 7-inch single
1. "Walking in Memphis" – 3:55
2. "Angels Running" – 4:35
- European CD single
1. "Walking in Memphis" – 3:55
2. "Angels Running" – 4:35
3. "Walking in Memphis" (Shut Up & Dance Instrumental) – 5:16
- European remix CD and 12-inch single
1. "Walking in Memphis" (Shut Up & Dance Vocal) – 5:04
2. "Walking in Memphis" (Shut Up & Dance Instrumental) – 5:10
3. "Walking in Memphis" (Rated P.G. Mix) – 7:25
4. "Walking in Memphis" (Baby Doc Mix) – 7:11

=== Charts ===
==== Weekly charts ====
Chart (1995–1996)	Peak position
Australia (ARIA)	65
Austria (Ö3 Austria Top 40)	17
Canada Top Singles (RPM)	60
Canada Adult Contemporary (RPM)	49
Denmark (Tjeklisten)	19
Estonia (Eesti Top 20)	5
Europe (Eurochart Hot 100)	36
Europe (European AC Radio)	9
Europe (European Hit Radio)	16
Germany (GfK)	63
Italy Airplay (Music & Media)	10
Netherlands (Single Top 100)	44
Poland Airplay (Music & Media)	2
Scottish Singles Sales (Official Charts)	7
Sweden (Sverigetopplistan)	13
UK Singles (Official Charts)	11
UK Radio Airplay (OCC)	8

==== Year-end charts ====
Chart (1995)	Position
Sweden (Topplistan)	96
UK Radio Airplay (OCC)	68

=== Certifications ===
Region	Certification	Certified units/sales
United Kingdom (BPI)	Silver	200,000^{‡}
^{‡} Sales+streaming figures based on certification alone.

=== Release history ===
Region	Date	Format(s)	Label(s)	Ref.
United Kingdom	October 16, 1995	CD; cassette	WEA	
Australia	October 23, 1995	CD	WEA	
Australia	November 20, 1995	CD; cassette (remixes)	WEA	

== Lonestar version ==
"Walking in Memphis"

Single by Lonestar

from the album From There to Here: Greatest Hits
- Released: August 11, 2003
- Recorded: 2003
- Genre: Country pop
- Length: 3:50
- Label: BNA
- Songwriter: Marc Cohn
- Producer: Dann Huff

Lonestar singles chronology
"My Front Porch Looking In" (2003)	"Walking in Memphis" (2003)	"Let's Be Us Again" (2004)

=== Background ===
American country music band Lonestar reached number eight on the Hot Country Songs chart and number 61 on the Billboard Hot 100 in 2003 with a remake of "Walking in Memphis" released as a single off the album From There to Here: Greatest Hits.

Lonestar's lead vocalist Richie McDonald recalled that, during the two years of the band's inaugural phase as a bar band, "Walking in Memphis" was a staple of their set list from the beginning: "After we got our record deal, we stopped doing [any] cover songs but ... a few years later, [we were] in Memphis, Tennessee getting ready to do a benefit for St. Jude's down on Beale Street" – i.e. St. Jude Children's Research Hospital – "[and] we thought this would be a good time to do 'Walking in Memphis,' because we were right there on Beale ... One of the label guys was there [and] said, "Y'all should record that." We started doing it in our live shows and it just became something we wanted to put out."

=== Charts ===
Chart (2003)	Peak position
US Hot Country Songs (Billboard)	8
US Billboard Hot 100	61

== Other versions ==
In the summer of 2005, Wouter (nl), the runner-up in Idool 2004, spent eleven weeks in the top 20 of the Flemish chart with his version of "Walking in Memphis", with the track spending three weeks at No. 3. The track was included on Rock On, Wouter's only album release to-date.

"Walking in Memphis" became a No. 5 hit in Sweden in December 2009 via a remake by Calle Kristiansson, the runner-up finalist in Idol 2009. Kristiansson's version of "Walking in Memphis" was included on his self-titled album issued in January 2010.

A concert performance of "Walking in Memphis" by Eric Church was featured in the first installment of the 15-LP (vinyl) box set of Church recordings titled 61 Days in Church.

English heavyweight boxer Tyson Fury covered the song a cappella adopted into "Walking in Las Vegas", during the post-fight interview to celebrate the victory against Deontay Wilder in their third fight, which ended in an 11th–round knockout.

== Songs based on "Walking in Memphis" ==
=== Shut Up and Dance version ("Raving I'm Raving") ===
English electronic duo Shut Up and Dance released "Raving I'm Raving" on May 18, 1992, based significantly on "Walking in Memphis". Several lyrics were altered, including the line "I'm walking in Memphis" becoming "I'm raving I'm raving". Cohn, who had not given the duo permission to change "Walking in Memphis", filed an injunction on the grounds of moral rights to prevent the single's release. Shut Up and Dance and Cohn's lawyers eventually agreed to release the single on two conditions: all sales had to be donated to charity, and no more copies of the single were to be made. With only 35,000 copies produced, "Raving I'm Raving" became a highly desired product at record stores, and the single debuted at number two on the UK Singles Chart in May 1992 despite being forecasted to top the chart during the midweek sales report.

After its debut, "Raving I'm Raving" had nearly exhausted its stock at record shops, causing it to drop to number 15 the following week and exit the UK Singles Chart altogether the week after. It also peaked at number 18 on the European Dance Radio Chart. Because of the injunction, Shut Up and Dance were not allowed to include the original version of the track on their 1992 album Death Is Not the End; instead, a re-recorded version was included, and the album's release was delayed from June 1992 to July 1992.

=== Scooter version ("I'm Raving") ===
In 1996, German hard dance band Scooter released a similar cover entitled "I'm Raving" as a single from their album Wicked!. The single was certified gold in Germany and peaked at number four on the German Singles Chart. Pan-European magazine Music & Media wrote about the song, "Remember Marc Cohn's beautiful piano ballad Walking In Memphis? Change the lyrics in I'm Raving, I'm Raving, add some bagpipe-synths and the semi-live-gimmick patented by Scooter. This makes chart-storming seem effortless."

=== Saturday Night Live version ("Walking in Staten") ===
In the November 20, 2021, episode of Saturday Night Live hosted by Simu Liu, cast member Pete Davidson performed "Walking in Staten" along with Cohn, country pop artist Big Wet, and Method Man. The parody's lyrics and visuals were a playful tribute to Davidson's native Staten Island.

== See also ==
- 1991 in music
