= Jai Wolf =

American electronic music producer (born 1991)

- Born: Sajeeb Saha; November 1, 1991 (age 35); Rajshahi, Bangladesh
- Origin: Long Island, New York, United States
- Genre: Electronic
- Occupation: DJ • Record producer
- Years active: 2013–present
- Label: Mom + Pop Music

Sajeeb Saha, known professionally as Jai Wolf, is a Bangladeshi-American DJ and producer. He is best known for his singles, "Indian Summer", "Like It's Over", and "Starlight". He is currently signed to Mom + Pop Music.

== Early life ==
Saha was born on November 1, 1991, in Bangladesh. The following year, his family moved to the United States, to the state of Illinois. He moved to Pittsburgh, Pennsylvania, at the age of seven and lived there for seven years before the family relocated to New York, where he attended Herricks High School on Long Island. He is a class of 2013 graduate of New York University's Gallatin School of Individualized Study, where he struggled to graduate because he was too focused on his music.

== Career ==
In 2011, Saha started producing electronic music under the moniker No Pets Allowed. Within a few years, his mashups and bootleg remixes began to generate attention, quickly rising within the internet music community.

In February 2014, Saha decided to part ways with the project and begin what is now known as Jai Wolf. Within the first few months, the project began to land a string of official remix opportunities for established artists including Melanie Martinez, Dirty South, Alesso and Odesza – each remix landing the No. 1 spot on Hype Machine. In late 2014, Skrillex turned Jai Wolf's bootleg remix of "Ease My Mind" into an official remix.

In 2015, Jai Wolf released his debut single "Indian Summer" through ODESZA's label, Foreign Family Collective. "Indian Summer" reached number 31 on Billboard's Hot Dance/Electronic song's chart. The track also earned a spot on the Triple J 2015 Hottest 100 in Australia.

In May 2016, Jai Wolf released his follow-up single, "Drive", through Foreign Family Collective.

On November 18, 2016, Jai Wolf released his debut EP, Kindred Spirits, through Mom + Pop music.

In April 2017, Jai Wolf released his single, "Starlight" which featured Mr Gabriel, followed by a performance at the 2017 Coachella Valley Music and Arts Festival.

On August 10, 2018, "Lost" featuring Chelsea Jade was released on Mom + Pop.

On January 14, 2019, Jai Wolf announced his debut album, The Cure to Loneliness, to be released on April 5, 2019. Two singles from the album were released the same day: "Lose My Mind" featuring Mr Gabriel and "Telepathy".

On June 8, 2022, Jai Wolf became the first Bangladeshi artist ever to sell out a concert at Red Rocks Amphitheatre, in Colorado, with the collaborative one-off concert "Infinite Light" with San Holo, one week after the release of their collaboration "We Will Meet Again", released via Mom + Pop Music.

In March 2023, Jai Wolf released "Want It All" featuring Evalyn, his first single in three years, on Mom + Pop. The song was released along with a music video directed by Andrew Donoho.

In November 2024, Jai Wolf released his second album The Red Eye Home featuring the singles "Want it All", "(I Dread The Day He Takes You To) Paris", "Tennis Skirt", "Heaven is Calling" & "Water Sign".

== Discography ==
=== Studio albums ===
Title	Details
The Cure to Loneliness	Released: April 5, 2019; Label: Pod / Inertia; Format: LP, Digital download

=== Extended plays ===
Title	Details	Peak chart positions
Title	Details	US Dance
Kindred Spirits	Released: November 18, 2016; Label: Mom + Pop Music; Format: Digital download	10

=== Singles ===
Year	Title	Peak chart positions	Certifications	Album
Year	Title	US Dance	Certifications	Album
2015	"Indian Summer"	31	RIAA: Gold; ARIA: Gold	Kindred Spirits
2016	"Drive" (featuring Chain Gang of 1974)	—		Kindred Spirits
2016	"Like It's Over" (featuring MNDR)	—		Kindred Spirits
2017	"Starlight" (featuring Mr Gabriel)	—		Non-album singles
2018	"Lost" (featuring Chelsea Jade)	—		Non-album singles
2019	"Lose My Mind / Telepathy"	—		The Cure to Loneliness
2019	"Your Way" (featuring Day Wave)	—		The Cure to Loneliness
2019	"This Song Reminds Me of You"	—		The Cure to Loneliness
2019	"Better Apart" (featuring Dresage)	—		The Cure to Loneliness
2020	"Moon Rider" (featuring Wrabel)	—		Non-album singles
2023	"Want It All" (featuring Evalyn)	—		Non-album singles
2023	"Don't Look Down" (featuring Banks)	—		Non-album singles
"—" denotes a recording that did not chart or was not released.

=== Remixes ===
Year	Title	Artist
2014	"Dollhouse"	Melanie Martinez
2014	"Say My Name"	Odesza
2014	"Heroes"	Alesso
2014	"With You"	Dirty South (featuring FMLYBND)
2014	"Ease My Mind"	Skrillex
2015	"Weekend"	Mocki
2015	"Miss U"	Kitty
2015	"Passenger"	Imad Royal
2015	"Player"	Tinashe
2016	"Feels"	Kiiara
2017	"Something Just Like This"	The Chainsmokers
2021	"blue"	Keshi
2021	"Drivin Thru the Night"	Petit Biscuit
