= Ragga Twins =

English ragga and jungle MC duo

The Ragga Twins
- Origin: Hackney, England
- Genres: Ragga, dancehall, jungle, hip hop
- Years active: 1989–present
- Labels: Shut Up and Dance Records, Positiva, Soul Jazz
- Members: Deman Rockers; Flinty Badman

The Ragga Twins, also known as RTC, are an English ragga and jungle MC duo of Deman Rockers (David Destouche) and Flinty Badman (Trevor Destouche). Originating from Hackney, England, they started out on London's Unity sound system, and are regarded as pioneers of the scene. AllMusic called them "crucial cogs in the development of U.K. dance music."

== History ==
The Ragga Twins originated as part of London's Unity sound system, operating under the name in 1989. They first came to prominence with a number of groundbreaking singles in the early 1990s including "Spliffhead", "Wipe the Needle", "Hooligan 69" and "Mixed Truth", with production by Shut Up & Dance. This was followed by album Reggae Owes Me Money in 1991. They resurfaced in 1995 on Positiva, and continued to release tracks intermittently into the 2000s.

The Ragga Twins longest musical relationship is with Aquasky, a partnership that was first cemented in 2001 when the tracks "All in Check" feat. CoGee and "Loko" were written for Botchit & Scarper. Four months later, the tracks "Coffee" and "Dem No No We" were recorded for drum and bass label Moving Shadow, and in 2002, the drum and bass track "Dirty Entertainers" was recorded with Aquasky on their now defunct Sonix label. The following year, a remix was created and white labels distributed but the single was never released due to Aquasky leaving their distribution deal with ST Holdings and moving to SRD.

A series of 12" singles have been released with Aquasky on their Passenger label since 2002, including new tracks for the 601 album We Do Bass and a Ragga Twins 2002–2013 compilation album. In 2004, Aquasky were approached by HBO for the usage of the tracks "Loko" or "Dem No No We" to be used in the Ali G series Ali G in Da USA. HBO finally settled on "Dem No No We" which took the Ragga Twins' new breakbeat output to America. A video was shot for the "Superbad" single in 2011 by b-boy and film-maker Charlie Marbles, a friend of Aquasky also from Bournemouth.

In 2008, the Twins lent their vocals to the Backdraft single, "Rock the Mic". In 2010, they were featured on Mason and the Fraudster's track "U Appear". Flinty Badman & Deman Rockers appeared in the Plan B crime film Ill Manors in 2012. In 2014, they featured on "All is Fair in Love and Brostep" and "Ragga Bomb" from Skrillex's debut album Recess, and "Zipper" from MUST DIE!'s album Death & Magic.

In 2008, Soul Jazz Records issued a compilation album of their early 1990s recordings entitled Ragga Twins Step Out.

The group released a new single in 2023 with "Too Much Madness". In 2024 Deman Rockers fell outside his home which lead to hospitalisation. Emergency surgery was carried out with the operation leaving him unable to perform. He was temporarily left bedbound. Rockers has since been able to perform, with a concert at the Isle of Wight Festival in 2025 with the brothers releasing the song "We are Junglists" in the same year.

Ragga Twins play regularly on the Kool London radio station.

== Discography ==
=== Albums ===
- Reggae Owes Me Money (Shut Up and Dance Records, 1991) – UK No. 26
- Rinsin' Lyrics (Positiva, 1995)
- Keep On Chant (Solid Vinyl Music, 2003)
- In Time with Wrongtom (Tru Thoughts, 2017)
- In Dub with Wrongtom (Tru Thoughts, 2017)

=== Compilations ===
- Ragga Twins Step Out (2008)

=== Singles ===
- "Illegal Gunshot" / "Spliffhead" (Shut Up and Dance Records, 1990) – UK No. 51
- "Wipe the Needle" / "Juggling" (Shut Up and Dance, 1991) – UK No. 71
- "Hooligan 69" (Shut Up and Dance, 1991) – UK No. 76
- "Mixed Truth" / "Bring Up the Mic Some More" (Shut Up and Dance, 1992) – UK No. 65
- "Shine Eye" feat. Junior Reed (Shut Up and Dance, 1992) – UK 63
- Freedom Train EP (Positiva, 1995)
- "All in Check" feat. CoGee / "Loko" with Aquasky (Botchit & Scarper, 2002)
- "Coffee" / "Dem No No We" with Aquasky (Moving Shadow, 2003)
- "Jerlipy lipy" (Solid Vinyl, 2003)
- "E Legal Gunshot" (Solid Vinyl, 2003)
- "Shut Em Down" with TC Izlam & Ed Solo (Solid Vinyl, 2003)
- "Dirty Entertainers" with Aquasky (Sonix, 2003)
- "Ready for This" with Aquasky (777 Records, 2005)
- "Everybody Hype" feat. DJ Go with Aquasky (777 Records, 2006)
- "Let Me See Your Hands" / "Let Me See Your Hands" with Aquasky (777 Records, 2007)
- "Rock the Mic" with Backdraft (Passenger Records, 2007)
- "Bring Forth Ya Booty" with 10 Sui & La Resistance (Mob Records, 2008)
- "Give It Up" with Aquasky (Passenger Records, 2008)
- "Living Legends" / "Raggatron" with Aquasky (Passenger Records, 2010)
- "Humble" feat. Tenor Fly with Aquasky (Passenger Records, 2011)
- "Heatwave" feat. MC Spyda, CoGee, Pedro Slimer & M-TEK (Passenger Records, 2012)
- "Hot Like We" with Realecta (2015)
- "All Is Fair in Love and Brostep" with Skrillex (Big Beat Records, 2014)
- "Ragga Bomb" with Skrillex (Big Beat Records, 2014)
- "Bad Man (Skrillex Remix)" with Skrillex (Owsla, 2015)
- "Get Ready 4 tha Drop" with Charlotte Devaney (Karma London, 2015)
- "Windpipe" with Barely Alive (Disciple, 2015)
- "Worldwide" with Metrik (Hospital Records, 2016)
- "Madman" with RIOT (Play Me Too Records, 2016)
- "Watch Out" with Dirtyphonics and Bassnectar (Monstercat, 2017)
- "Move It Up" with MDE (Get Twisted Records, 2017)
- "Kingston" with Mekanikal (Harsh Records, 2018)
- "Hammer" with Mr Quest (Solid Vinyl Music, 2018)
- "Ready" with Ndrew LG (Nelation, 2018)
- "For the People" with Seanie T (Fatback Records, 2018)
- "For the People (Dub)" with Seanie T (Fatback Records, 2018)
- "Ragga House" with Sentinel Groove (Tumbata Records, 2019)
- "Ragga House (Radio Edit)" with Sentinel Groove (Tumbata Records, 2019)
- "Toppa Top" with Full Kontakt & VEGAS (Bad Taste Recordings, 2019)
- War Start EP with Dr Meaker, Krucial & Lexxus (Kartoons, 2019)
- "Computa Hakka" with Pegboard Nerds (Monstercat, 2019)
- "Blood" with Gray (Born On Road Records" 2019)
- "Fruity" with Krucial (Kartoons, 2019)
- "We a Dem" with High Roll (Formation Records, 2021)
- "Mad Again" with Krucial (Kartoons, 2021)
- "Mad Again (Dub)" with Krucial (Kartoons, 2021)
- "Depolarize" with Dirt Monkey (19K, 2021)
- "Bloom" with Sammy Virji (self-released by Sammy Virji, 2022)
- "Gyal Factory (Radio Mix)" with Rumble (Liondub International, 2022)
- "Bring the Fire" with Iskia (Jungle Cakes, 2022)
- "Party Starters" with J Wilz, LOAD B & BlckHry (self-released by J Wilz, 2023)
- "Big Hammer" with James Blake (Polydor, 2023)
- "Bruk It Up" with Charlotte Devaney & M-Tek (Karma London Records, 2023)
- "Bring the Fire" with Iskia (Jungle Cakes, 2023)
- "Keys to the City" with Iskia (Jungle Cakes, 2023)
- "Fix" with Nasser UK & Teej (Jungle Cakes, 2023)
- "Allstars Mic" with Krucial (DnB Allstars Records, 2023)
- "Pull It Back" with Bully & DJ Millz (Kartoons, 2024)
- "We Set It" with Barely Alive (Killed It!, 2026)

== See also ==
- Shut Up and Dance
