= Burning the Daze =

Studio album by Marc Cohn
- Released: March 17, 1998
- Studio: Big House Studios, 12th Street Studios, New York Noise, Looking Glass Studios, RPM Studios, Sound On Sound, Big House Studios, Right Track Recording, Sony Music Studios and Magic Shop Studios (New York City, New York); Bearsville Studios (Bearsville, New York); Mix This! (Los Angeles, California)
- Genre: Pop, rock
- Length: 46:29
- Label: Atlantic
- Producer: Malcolm Burn; Marc Cohn; John Leventhal; Paul Samwell-Smith

Marc Cohn chronology
The Rainy Season (1993)	Burning the Daze (1998)	Join the Parade (2007)

Burning the Daze is the third studio album by American singer-songwriter Marc Cohn, released in 1998 on Atlantic Records. The album peaked at number 114 on the Billboard 200 Chart.

== Reception ==
Professional ratings
Review scores
Source	Rating
AllMusic	3/5 stars

Writing for AllMusic, Stephen Thomas Erlewine stated that Burning the Daze "follows the same musical pattern as his first two albums — it's adult contemporary pop with slight folk and country influences". He believed that Cohen had tended to "polish his productions a little too much, which lessens the melodic impact of the songs somewhat", but concluded there were "a number of solid songs here" and it was "worthwhile for fans".

== Track listing ==
All tracks written by Marc Cohn, except where noted.

No.	Title	Writer(s)	Length
1.	"Already Home"	Marc Cohn, John Leventhal	4:44
2.	"Girl of Mysterious Sorrow"		4:18
3.	"Providence"		3:56
4.	"Healing Hands"		4:30
5.	"Lost You in the Canyon"		4:17
6.	"Saints Preserve Us"		4:11
7.	"Olana"		4:23
8.	"Turn to Me"	Marc Cohn, Kevin Salem	3:30
9.	"Valley of the Kings"		3:41
10.	"Turn on Your Radio"	Harry Nilsson	4:02
11.	"Ellis Island"		5:12

Japan bonus tracks (AMCY-2572)
No.	Title	Length
12.	"Burning Bed"	3:08
13.	"The Days"	3:38

== Personnel ==
- Marc Cohn – lead vocals, acoustic guitar (1–3, 8, 11), percussion (1, 10), acoustic piano (4, 6, 7), backing vocals (4), tack piano (5), guitars (5), slide guitar (9)
- John Leventhal – keyboards (1–3, 5, 7, 10), guitars (1, 3–5, 7, 8, 10), bass (1–3, 7, 10), percussion (1, 2, 5, 7, 8, 10), harmonica (1), electric guitar (2), nylon string guitar (2), tamboura (2), glockenspiel (3), organ (4), mandolin (5, 7), backing vocals (5), horn arrangements (6), acoustic piano (8), melodica (8), high-string guitar (11)
- Malcolm Burn – organ (6), percussion (6), backing vocals (8)
- Tom "T-Bone" Wolk – accordion (9), cittern (9), bass (9)
- Jon Brion – harmonium (11)
- Bill Dillon – guitars (6)
- Larry Campbell – acoustic guitar (11)
- Mark Plati – bass (4, 5, 8)
- Toby Myers – bass (6)
- Shawn Pelton – drums (1–5, 7, 9), percussion (4)
- Aaron Comess – drums (6)
- Brady Blade – drums (8)
- Rodney Crowell – handclaps (5)
- Rick Depofi – tenor saxophone (1, 6), marimba (3), handclaps (5)
- Larry Farrell – trombone (6)
- Chris Botti – trumpet (1), flugelhorn (7)
- Peter Gordon – French horn (9)
- Jane Scarpantoni – cello (11)
- Patty Griffin – harmony vocals (1, 4), backing vocals (3)
- Catherine Russell – backing vocals (3)
- Martin Sexton – harmony vocals (3)
- Frank Floyd – backing vocals (4)
- Curtis King Jr. – backing vocals (4)
- Kenny White – backing vocals (4), percussion (9)
- Rosanne Cash – harmony vocals (7)
- Darryl Johnson – backing vocals (8)

== Production ==
- Jennifer Stark – A&R
- Marc Cohn – producer
- John Leventhal – producer (1–8, 10), engineer (1–3, 7, 10), additional recording (4), recording (5), mixing (6, 11), additional production (11), additional recording (11)
- Paul Samwell-Smith – producer (4, 9)
- Malcolm Burn – producer (6, 8), engineer (6), additional recording (8)
- Mark Plati – engineer (1–4, 6, 7), recording (5, 8), additional recording (6), mixing (8)
- Frank Filipetti – engineer (4, 9), mixing (9), additional recording (11)
- Matthew Knobel – engineer (11)
- Kevin Killen – mixing (1–4, 7, 10)
- Bob Clearmountain – mixing (5)
- Rick Depofi – additional recording (5), assistant engineer
- Suzanne Dyer – additional engineer (11), assistant engineer
- Craig Bishop – assistant engineer
- Dante de Sole – assistant engineer, mix assistant
- Ken Feldman – assistant engineer
- Scott Gormley – assistant engineer
- John Bleich – mix assistant
- Jim Caruana – mix assistant
- Ryoji Hata – mix assistant
- James Saez – mix assistant
- Chris Theis – mix assistant
- Bob Ludwig – mastering at Gateway Mastering (Portland, Maine)
- Jill Dell'Abate – production manager, contractor
- Thomas Bricker – art direction, design
- Viktor Koen – illustrations
- Cynthia Levine – photography
- Frank Ockenfels – photography
