= Try It Out (Skrillex and Alvin Risk song) =

Single by Skrillex and Alvin Risk

from the album Recess
- Released: 14 October 2013
- Recorded: 2011–13
- Genre: Dubstep
- Length: 3:49 (Neon Mix)
- Label: Big Beat; Owsla; Atlantic
- Songwriters: Sonny Moore; Marcio Alvarado
- Producers: Skrillex; Alvin Risk

Skrillex singles chronology
"Wild for the Night" (2013)	"Try It Out" (2013)	"Ragga Bomb" (2014)

Alvin Risk singles chronology
"Empty Hearted" (2013)	"Try It Out" (2013)

Alternative cover

Audio sample
- "Try It Out" (Neon Mix): file; help

Music video
- "Try It Out" on YouTube

"Try It Out" is a song by the American record producers Skrillex and Alvin Risk. It was released on 14 October 2013, as the lead single from Skrillex's debut album Recess, through Big Beat, Owsla and Atlantic Records. The Neon Mix acts as the single, although several versions are available.

== Background and release ==
The song was premiered at Egyptian Room on 11 October 2011, in its original demo form. A 2012 version features in Call of Duty: Black Ops II. The VIP mix was debuted on a Rinse FM show on 16 January 2013. Later on, the Black Ops version of the track was combined with Alvin Risk's song "Yeah" to form the neon mix. The neon mix premiered on 15 June, in Skrillex's Essential Mix, and the full version was later premiered as the music video shortly before release. The neon mix is featured in Fantasia: Music Evolved. According to Moore, there have been at least eight different mixes of the song. The "Put Em Up" mix is a mash-up with the Alvin Risk song of the same name, which featured on the Junk Food extended play. It features vocals from Jason Aalon Butler from the American hardcore band letlive.

== Music video ==
A music video to accompany the release of "Try It Out (Neon Mix)" was first released onto YouTube on 9 October 2013 at a total length of three minutes and fifty seconds.

Another music video of the "Neon Mix" was uploaded on YouTube on 5 August 2014 and runs for a total length of three minutes and fifty-five seconds. The music video was directed by Tony T. Datis, who also directed several other Skrillex music videos, including "Bangarang" and "First of the Year (Equinox)". Skrillex stated in the description on the video, "I had a weird dream when I was with Alvin Risk somewhere in France..."

== Track listing ==
CD single and digital download
No.	Title	Length
1.	"Try It Out" (Neon Mix)	3:49
2.	"Try It Out" (Try Harder Mix)	4:46
3.	"Try It Out" (Put Em Up Mix) (featuring Jason Aalon Butler of letlive.)	5:22
Total length:		13:57

== Chart performance ==
=== Charts ===
Chart (2013–14)	Peak position
France (SNEP)	185
US Hot Dance/Electronic Songs (Billboard)	19

=== Year-end charts ===
Chart (2014)	Position
US Hot Dance/Electronic Songs (Billboard)	85

== Release history ==
Region	Date	Format	Label
Worldwide	14 October 2013	CD; digital download	Big Beat; Owsla; Atlantic
