= Instinct (Niki & the Dove album) =

2012 studio album by Niki & the Dove

Studio album by Niki & the Dove
- Released: 7 August 2012
- Genres: Synth-pop; indietronica; alternative dance
- Length: 48:14
- Labels: TEN; Sub Pop; Mercury

Niki & the Dove chronology
Instinct (2012)	Everybody's Heart Is Broken Now (2016)

Singles from Instinct
- 1. "The Fox" Released: 10 May 2011; 2. "DJ, Ease My Mind" Released: 24 February 2012; 3. "Tomorrow" Released: 2 May 2012; 4. "Somebody" Released: 24 August 2012; 5. "Love to the Test" Released: 7 November 2012

Instinct is the debut studio album released by the Swedish indietronica duo Niki & the Dove, released on 7 August 2012 by TEN Music Group, Sub Pop, and Mercury Records. It is their second release on US label Sub Pop.

== Track listing ==
Instinct track listing
No.	Title	Length
1.	"Tomorrow"	3:52
2.	"The Drummer"	3:56
3.	"In Our Eyes"	5:02
4.	"The Gentle Roar"	3:44
5.	"Mother Protect"	5:05
6.	"Last Night"	3:19
7.	"Somebody"	2:51
8.	"Love to the Test"	3:58
9.	"DJ, Ease My Mind"	4:03
10.	"Winterheart"	4:06
11.	"The Fox"	4:19
12.	"Under the Bridges"	3:59 / 8:42*

UK iTunes bonus tracks
No.	Title	Length
13.	"All This Youth"	4:00
14.	"The Drummer" (first demo)	4:32
15.	"Everybody's Talking"	3:47
16.	"Taylor" (2009 Island sessions)	5:04

US bonus tracks
No.	Title	Length
13.	"The Beach"	4:02
14.	"All This Youth"	4:00

- On some versions of the album, "Under the Bridges" has an extended drum ending.

== Credits ==
Credits for Instinct adapted from AllMusic.

- Malin Dahlstrom – art direction, composer, design, producer
- Björn Engelmann – mastering
- Eliot Hazel – photography
- Anders Hvenare – mixing
- Gustaf Karlof – art direction, composer, design, producer
- Ted Krotkiewski – mixing
- Elof Loelv – composer, producer
- Mat Maitland – art direction, design, digital imagery
- Lasse Mårtén – mixing
- Niki & the Dove – primary artist

== Charts ==
Chart performance for Instinct
Chart (2012)	Peak position
Scottish Albums (Official Charts)	96
Swedish Albums (Sverigetopplistan)	60
UK Albums (Official Charts)	60
