= Ragga Bomb =

2014 song by Skrillex featuring Ragga Twins

Single by Skrillex featuring Ragga Twins

from the album Recess
- Released: March 14, 2014
- Genre: Drumstep; brostep; jungle
- Length: 4:18
- Label: Big Beat; Owsla; Atlantic; Asylum
- Songwriters: Sonny Moore; Trevor Destouche; David Destouche
- Producer: Skrillex

Skrillex singles chronology
"Try It Out" (2013)	"Ragga Bomb" (2014)	"Recess" (2014)

Music video
- "Ragga Bomb" on YouTube

Audio sample
- "Ragga Bomb": file; help

"Ragga Bomb" is a song by American record producer Skrillex, featuring vocals from British jungle music duo Ragga Twins. It was released on March 14, 2014 as part of Skrillex's debut studio album Recess (2014). It entered the Flanders Ultratip 100 at number 75. An EP entitled Ease My Mind v Ragga Bomb Remixes, consisting of remixes of both songs, was released on November 24, 2014.

== Music video ==
An official music video to accompany the release of "Ragga Bomb" was released onto YouTube on April 1, 2014. It was directed by Terence Neale.

== Track listing ==
Ease My Mind v Ragga Bomb Remixes

Remix album by Skrillex
- Released: November 24, 2014
- Genre: Drum and bass; trap
- Label: Big Beat; Owsla; Atlantic; Asylum
- Producer: Skrillex

Skrillex chronology
Recess Remixes (2014)	Ease My Mind v Ragga Bomb Remixes (2014)	Dirty Vibe Remixes (2014)

Ease My Mind v Ragga Bomb Remixes
No.	Title	Length
1.	"Ragga Bomb (featuring Ragga Twins)" (Skrillex and Zomboy Remix)	3:50
2.	"Ragga Bomb (featuring Ragga Twins)" (Teddy Killerz remix)	3:57
3.	"Ease My Mind (featuring Niki & The Dove)" (Jai Wolf remix)	4:54
4.	"Ease My Mind (featuring Niki & The Dove)" (Good Times Ahead remix)	4:41
Total length:		17:22

== Credits and personnel ==
- Sonny "Skrillex" Moore – production
- Trevor Destouche – vocals
- David Destouche – vocals

== Chart performance ==
=== Weekly charts ===
Chart (2014)	Peak position
Belgium (Ultratip Bubbling Under Flanders)	75
US Hot Dance/Electronic Songs (Billboard)	16

=== Year-end charts ===
Chart (2014)	Position
US Hot Dance/Electronic Songs (Billboard)	66
