= Shut Up and Dance (duo) =

English techno band

- Origin: Stoke Newington, London, England
- Genres: House, breakbeat hardcore, jungle, breakbeat, UK garage
- Years active: 1988–present
- Labels: Shut Up and Dance Records, Pulse-8 Records
- Members: Philip Johnson; Carlton Hyman
- Website: http://www.shutupanddance.co.uk/

Shut Up and Dance are an English duo that fused hip hop, house and hardcore. They are acknowledged as one of the pioneers of breakbeat hardcore and jungle music.

== Career ==
The group was formed in 1988 in Stoke Newington, London, by Philip 'PJ' Johnson and Carlton 'Smiley' Hyman. In 1990, they made the lower end of the UK chart with two singles, "£10 to Get In" and "Lamborghini", both released on their own record label, Shut Up and Dance Records. At this time, they also worked with the Ragga Twins for the first time and produced their first releases.

In 1992, they reached No. 43 with their double A-side single "Autobiography of a Crackhead / The Green Man", before hitting the headlines in May of that year when they released "Raving I'm Raving", based on Marc Cohn's hit single "Walking in Memphis". Upon its release, Cohn obtained an injunction to stop production of further copies of the single due to the lack of clearance. A court order was also sought to prevent the sale of any copies already produced, but Cohn was persuaded to allow such sales on condition that all the proceeds went to charity. This caused panic-buying of the copies on sale, as consumers knew that no more would be produced. The single soared to No. 2 on the UK Singles Chart, but plummeted to No. 15 the following week, before leaving the chart completely. Nevertheless, the No. 2 chart position earned them a live performance slot on BBC One's Top of the Pops alongside Bassheads, Don-E and Lisa Stansfield on the 28 May 1992 episode, though as they could not perform the "Walking in Memphis" melody they had to sing the lyrics to another tune.

Shut Up and Dance released one further single from their Death Is Not the End album, "The Art of Moving Butts", which featured singer Erin. The album itself reached No. 38 on the UK Albums Chart in June 1992.

Throughout 1994/5, they released a number of jungle tracks under the alias 'Red Light'. This was followed by the 1995 album Black Men United which encompassed jungle, downtempo, reggae and hip hop. A single from this album, "Save It 'Til the Mourning After", which samples Duran Duran's hit "Save a Prayer", reached No. 25 on the UK chart and was track 14 on Now That's What I Call Music! 30. In 1995, "Walking in Memphis" was covered by Cher for her twenty-first studio album titled It's a Man's World and when it was released as a single on 16 October 1995 it came with remixes produced by Shut Up and Dance.

In the early 2000s, they re-emerged releasing a number of UK garage tracks, followed by the breakbeat album Reclaim the Streets.

== Discography ==
=== Albums ===
- Dance Before the Police Come (Shut Up and Dance, 1990)
- Death Is Not the End (Shut Up and Dance, 1992) – UK No. 38
- Black Men United (Pulse 8, 1995)
- Reclaim the Streets (Shut Up and Dance, 2004)
- The Great British Public (Shut Up and Dance, 2007)

=== Compilations ===
- How the East Was Won 1989-2009 (Shut Up and Dance, 2009)

=== Singles ===
- "5, 6, 7, 8", (Shut Up and Dance, 1989) – UK No. 42
- "£10 to Get In / Raps My Occupation", (Shut Up and Dance, 1989) – UK No. 56
- "Lamborghini / A Change Soon Come" (Shut Up and Dance, 1990) – UK No. 55
- "Dance Before the Police Come" (Shut Up and Dance, 1991)
- "Derek Went Mad / This Town Needs a Sheriff" (Shut Up and Dance, 1991) – UK No. 81
- "Autobiography of a Crackhead / The Green Man" (Shut Up and Dance, 1992) – UK No. 43
- "Raving I'm Raving" (Shut Up and Dance, 1992) – UK No. 2
- "The Art of Moving Butts" (Shut Up and Dance, 1992) – UK No. 69
- "Hands in the Air" (Shut Up and Dance, 1994)
- "Say Party" (Shut Up and Dance, 1994)
- "Save It 'Til the Mourning After" (Pulse 8, 1995) – UK No. 25
- "I Love U" (Pulse 8, 1995) – UK No. 68
- "Black Men United" (Pulse 8, 1995)
- "The Weekend's Here" (Pulse 8, 1995) – UK No. 82
- "Green Man" (Shut Up and Dance, 1998)
- "Hold Me Down" (Shut Up and Dance, 1998)
- "Got Em Locked" (Shut Up and Dance, 1998)
- "Psycho Jump" (Shut Up and Dance, 1999)
- "No:Doubt" (Shut Up and Dance, 2001)
- "Moving Up" (Shut Up and Dance, 2001)
- "4th Floor" (Shut Up and Dance, 2002)
- "Heaven on Earth" (Shut Up and Dance, 2002)
- "Reclaim the Streets" (Shut Up and Dance, 2003)
- "Release the Gimp" (Shut Up and Dance, 2003)
- "Arrest the President" (Shut Up and Dance, 2003)
- "SuperNova" (Shut Up and Dance, 2003)
- "Sensation / Culture Clash" (Shut Up and Dance, 2007)
- "Outta National / Da Night Bus" (Shut Up and Dance, 2007)
- "Make the Needle Jump" (Shut Up and Dance, 2007)
- "Glory Days / All Loved Up" (Shut Up and Dance, 2007)
- "Come to Turn It Out" (Shut Up and Dance, 2008)
- "Epileptic" (Shut Up and Dance, 2008)
- "Cream" (Shut Up and Dance, 2009)
- "Tell Me / Love Will" (Shut Up and Dance, 2009)
- "Suicide" (Shut Up and Dance, 2009)

== See also ==
- Ragga Twins
- Reggae Owes Me Money (produced by the duo)
- Now Is Early (produced by the duo)
