= Marc Cohn (album) =

Studio album by Marc Cohn
- Released: February 12, 1991
- Studios: Quad Recording (New York City, New York)
- Genres: Folk rock, pop
- Length: 45:41
- Label: Atlantic
- Producers: Marc Cohn; Ben Wisch

Marc Cohn chronology
Marc Cohn (1991)	The Rainy Season (1993)

Singles from Marc Cohn
- 1. "Walking in Memphis" Released: March 1991; 2. "Silver Thunderbird" Released: 1991; 3. "True Companion" Released: 1991; 4. "29 Ways" Released: 1991; 5. "Ghost Trains" Released: 1992; 6. "Strangers in a Car" Released: 1992

Professional ratings
Review scores
Source	Rating
AllMusic	4.5/5 stars
NME	7/10
The Vancouver Sun	3.5/5 stars

Marc Cohn is the debut studio album by American singer-songwriter Marc Cohn, released on February 12, 1991 by Atlantic Records. The album peaked at No. 38 on the Billboard 200 Chart. It was RIAA certified gold in 1992 and was certified platinum in 1996. The album peaked at number 31 in Australia and was certified gold there in 1992.

The album is known for the hit single "Walking in Memphis". Following the release of the album, Cohn won the 1992 Grammy Award for Best New Artist.

== Track listing ==
Track 9 written by Willie Dixon; all other tracks written by Marc Cohn.

No.	Title	Length
1.	"Walking in Memphis"	4:13
2.	"Ghost Train"	4:13
3.	"Silver Thunderbird"	4:39
4.	"Dig Down Deep"	5:09
5.	"Walk on Water"	4:02
6.	"Miles Away"	3:23
7.	"Saving the Best for Last"	5:35
8.	"Strangers in a Car"	2:47
9.	"29 Ways"	3:06
10.	"Perfect Love"	4:24
11.	"True Companion"	4:10

== Personnel ==
Adapted from the album's liner notes.

- Marc Cohn – vocals, acoustic piano (1, 3–8, 11), electric piano (2), backing vocals (2, 3), organ (9), acoustic guitar (10)
- Chris Palmaro – Hammond organ (1)
- Eric Rehl – keyboards (1, 4, 11)
- John Leventhal – organ (1), guitars (1, 2, 4, 6, 8, 10), bass (1, 2, 4, 6), six-string bass (2, 4, 7), drum programming (2), shaker (2), bouzouki (6, 11), electric guitar (7), slide guitar (11)
- Kenny White – backing vocals (2, 3), keyboards (3), percussion (3, 11)
- Ben Wisch – keyboards (3, 5–8, 11)
- Stephen Tubin – accordion (3), harmonium (7)
- Robin Batteau – acoustic guitar (3), mandolin (3), violin (11)
- Bill Dillon – pedal steel guitar (3), guitars (5)
- David Spinozza – acoustic guitar (7)
- Mark Egan – bass (7, 10)
- Dennis McDermott – drums (1, 2)
- Steve Gadd – drums (7, 10)
- Jerry Marotta – drums (9), percussion (9)
- Bashiri Johnson – percussion (2, 7, 10)
- Don Alias – percussion (3), chimes (5)
- Arto Tunçboyacıyan – percussion (4), backing vocals (4)
- Glen Velez – Filipino buzz sticks (4), shaker (4), frame drum (4)
- Peter Gordon – French horn (3)
- Vivian Cherry – backing vocals (1)
- Dennis Collins – backing vocals (1)
- Ada Dyer – backing vocals (1)
- Darryl Tookes – backing vocals (1)
- Frank Floyd – backing vocals (2)
- Milt Grayson – backing vocals (2)
- Frank Simms – backing vocals (2)
- James Taylor – vocals (10)

== Production ==
- Arranged by Marc Cohn, John Leventhal and Kenny White.
- Produced by Marc Cohn and Ben Wisch
- Recorded, engineered and mixed by Ben Wisch
- Assistant engineers – Dennis Cupit, Matt Knobel, Mike Krowiak, Donna Roth and Chris Theis.
- Digital sequencing (track 7) – Matt Knobel
- Mastered by Bob Ludwig at Masterdisk (New York, NY).
- Art direction and design – Roger Gorman at Reiner Design Consultants, Inc.
- Photography – Peter Liepke
- Project coordinator – Kathy Rooney

== Charts ==
=== Weekly charts ===
Chart (1991–1992)	Peak position
Australian Albums (ARIA)	31
Austrian Albums (Ö3 Austria)	36
Canada Top Albums/CDs (RPM)	15
German Albums (Offizielle Top 100)	14
New Zealand Albums (RMNZ)	35
Swedish Albums (Sverigetopplistan)	40
Swiss Albums (Schweizer Hitparade)	23
UK Albums (Official Charts)	27
US Billboard 200	38

=== Year-end charts ===
Chart (1991)	Position
Canada Top Albums/CDs (RPM)	70

== Certifications ==
Certifications for Marc Cohn
Region	Certification	Certified units/sales
Australia (ARIA)	Gold	35,000^{^}
Germany (BVMI)	Gold	250,000^{^}
New Zealand (RMNZ)	Gold	7,500^{‡}
United Kingdom (BPI)	Gold	100,000^{^}
United States (RIAA)	Platinum	1,000,000^{^}
^{^} Shipments figures based on certification alone.^{‡} Sales+streaming figures based on certification alone.
