= Listening Booth: 1970 =

Studio album by Marc Cohn
- Released: July 20, 2010
- Recorded: New York City
- Length: 43:09
- Label: Saguaro Road
- Producer: John Leventhal

Marc Cohn chronology
Join the Parade (2007)	Listening Booth: 1970 (2010)

Professional ratings
Review scores
Source	Rating
AllMusic	2/5 stars
Rolling Stone	3.5/5 stars

Listening Booth: 1970 is the fifth studio album by American singer-songwriter Marc Cohn, released in 2010.

The album was a collection of Cohn's favorite songs from 1970, when he was aged 11. He explained: "It was the beginning of me really falling in love with records and albums and becoming obsessed as a fan. I was a little kid dreaming to find a way to make that a career, and that was the music that started me on that path." He said he was determined to put his own stamp on each song: "For me, it's like what's the use of doing something that was initially brilliant and well known if you don't have anything to bring to it."

The one song on the album not originally released in 1970 was the Box Tops' 1967 hit "The Letter". Cohn said the song was included on the basis of Joe Cocker's 1970 version.

== Track listing ==
No.	Title	Writer(s)	Length
1.	"Wild World"	Cat Stevens	4:15
2.	"Look at Me"	John Lennon	3:06
3.	"Maybe I'm Amazed"	Paul McCartney	3:18
4.	"Make It with You" (with India.Arie)	David Gates	3:51
5.	"The Letter"	Wayne Carson Thompson	2:43
6.	"The Only Living Boy in New York"	Paul Simon	4:27
7.	"After Midnight"	JJ Cale	2:50
8.	"The Tears of a Clown" (with Kristina Train)	Stevie Wonder, Hank Cosby, Smokey Robinson	3:48
9.	"No Matter What" (with Aimee Mann)	Pete Ham	3:42
10.	"New Speedway Boogie" (with Jim Lauderdale)	Jerry Garcia, Robert Hunter	4:41
11.	"Into the Mystic"	Van Morrison	3:14
12.	"Long As I Can See the Light"	John Fogerty	3:19

Barnes & Noble exclusive edition bonus track
No.	Title	Writer(s)	Length
13.	"Close to You"	Burt Bacharach, Hal David	4:12

iTunes bonus track
No.	Title	Writer(s)	Length
13.	"Signed, Sealed, Delivered I'm Yours"	Stevie Wonder, Lee Garrett, Syreeta Wright, Lula Mae Hardaway	0:00

== Personnel ==
- Marc Cohn – lead vocals
- John Leventhal – keyboards, organ, guitars, bass (1–5, 7–12), percussion
- Rich Hinman – pedal steel guitar (9)
- Tim Luntzel – upright bass (6)
- Dan Rieser – drums (1, 2, 4, 5, 7, 8, 9, 11)
- Shawn Pelton – drums (3, 10)
- Rick Depofi – percussion, horns
- India.Arie – lead vocal ("Make It With You")
- Kristina Train – harmony vocal ("The Tears of a Clown")
- Aimee Mann – harmony vocal ("No Matter What")
- Jim Lauderdale – harmony vocal ("New Speedway Boogie")
- Kenny Williams – harmony vocal ("The Letter"), backing vocal ("Maybe I'm Amazed")
- Curtis King – backing vocal ("Maybe I'm Amazed")
- James "D-Train" Williams – backing vocal ("Maybe I'm Amazed")

== Production ==
- John Leventhal – producer, arrangements, mixing
- Rick Depofi – co-producer, engineer, mixing
- Mike Jason – executive producer
- Bas Hartong – A&R
- Reuben Cohen – mastering
- Gavin Lurssen – mastering
- Karen Malluk – project manager
- Susan Winslow – project manager
- Gail Marowitz – art direction, design
- Jennifer Tzar – photography
- Olivia Kim – editorial research
- Marc Cohn – liner notes
