= Alvin Risk =

American record producer

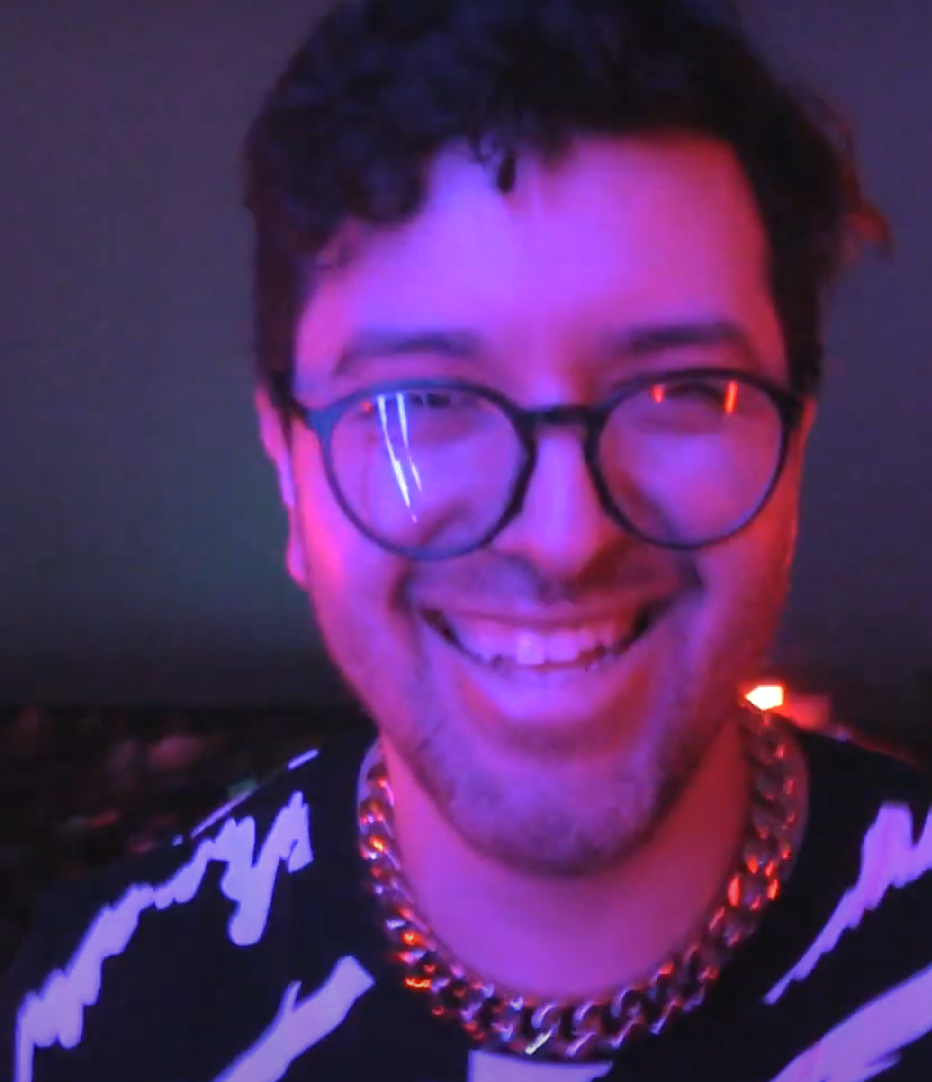
- Risk in 2022

Background information
- Born: Marcio Alvarado
- Origin: Washington, D.C.
- Genres: Electronic, moombahton, drumstep, trap
- Occupations: Record producer; singer; songwriter; remixer
- Instrument: Vocals
- Years active: 2003–present
- Labels: Owsla; Dim Mak; Ministry of Sound; Memory LTD
- Website: Alvin Risk Official Site

Marcio Alvarado, better known by his stage name Alvin Risk, is an American electronic music producer, singer and DJ from Washington, D.C., US. He has released music on Owsla, Dim Mak, and Ministry of Sound. He has also released under the label Memory LTD. Risk is the brother of Painted Face, singer and producer Allie Alvarado.

== Career ==
Risk originally produced music under the alias Telemetrik and was a founding member of the drum and bass duo Corrupt Souls alongside Impulse (Josh Clark), which was active from 2004 to 2007.

Corrupt Souls have released material on Ohm Resistance (Submerged's record label), Renegade Hardware, Moving Shadow, and Black Sun Empire's record label. They are also credited on the project by Bill Laswell and Robert Soares, Method of Defiance - Inamorata. The band is connected to Submerged.

== Discography ==
=== Extended plays ===
Title	EP details	Tracks
The Making Of	Released: 8 August 2010; Label: Self-released; Formats: Digital download	1. "At Last"; 2. "Someone"; 3. "Safe"; 4. "Wave"
Two Strokes Raw (with Tittsworth)	Released: 20 May 2011; Label: Plant; Formats: Digital download	1. "La Campana" (featuring Maluca); 2. "Pendejas"; 3. "Porcacheese"; 4. "Carter Boost" (featuring Scottie B)
Infinity	Released: 24 April 2012; Label: Dim Mak, Ministry of Sound; Formats: Digital download	1. "Psychotic"; 2. "Survival" (featuring Sirah); 3. "Infinity"; 4. "Pray" (featuring Jason Aalon Butler)
JunkFood	Released: 27 May 2013; Label: Memory LTD; Formats: Digital download	1. "Zoom!"; 2. "Put 'Em Up" (featuring Jason Aalon Butler); 3. "TR0NCE" (with HYX); 4. "Wash Dat"
Venture	Released: 11 November 2014; Label: Memory LTD; Formats: Digital download	1. "Alone"; 2. "Dark Heart"; 3. "Safe"; 4. "Monsters"; 5. "Wave"
Ever	Released: 10 March 2017; Label: Memory LTD; Formats: Digital download	1. "Ever"; 2. "The Gate"; 3. "The Spook"; 4. "The Craft"

=== Singles ===
Year	Song	Label
2011	"One" (with Bulletproof)	Black Sun Empire Records
2013	"Skyclad"	Owsla
2013	"Empty Hearted" (with Designer Drugs)	Ultra Records
2013	"Try It Out" (with Skrillex)	Big Beat / Owsla
2015	"Beastmode" (featuring Hodgy Beats) / "The Kingdom"	Fool's Gold Records
2017	"Fade to You" (featuring Angelika Vee)	Memory
2018	"O.P.E.N." (as HA with Hodgy)	Poortrait
2018	"Precious" (as HA with Hodgy)	Poortrait

=== Other appearances ===
Year	Song	Album	Label
2012	"Cities"	Owsla Presents Free Treats Vol. II	Owsla
2016	"Dreamtime" (featuring Princesa)	Owsla Worldwide Broadcast	Owsla
2019	"Fuji Opener" (Skrillex featuring Alvin Risk)	Show Tracks	Owsla

=== Production credits ===
Title	Artist	EP details	Tracks
Undreamt EP	Painted Face	Released: 20 September 2010; Label: Unsigned; Formats: Digital download	1. "Undreamt"; 2. "Favorite One"; 3. "Sum of Me"; 4. "Girls in Love"
Paper Heart EP	Painted Face	Released: 6 January 2015; Label: Unsigned; Formats: Digital download	1. "Tug of War" (Long Edit); 2. "Ribbons of Gold"; 3. "Undertow"; 4. "Paper Heart"

=== Remixes ===
Year	Song	Artist
2010	"Back Up in This"	Designer Drugs
2010	"Etheric Device"	Glass Candy
2010	"Starlight"	Risqué
2010	"July Flame"	Laura Veirs
2011	"Fly by Night"	Cerebral Vortex
2011	"Through the Prism"	Designer Drugs
2011	"Jericho"	Jamaica
2011	"Cameras"	Matt & Kim
2011	"Back Flash"	Edan Everywhere
2011	"Diminishing Returns"	Ali Love
2011	"Stay Awake"	Example
2011	"Dance Without You"	Skylar Grey
2011	"Roman"	Housse de Racket
2011	"Dirty Dancer"	Oh My!
2011	"Kill the Noise"	Kill the Noise
2011	"Earthquakey People"	Steve Aoki featuring Rivers Cuomo
2011	"Eyes"	Kaskade featuring Mindy Gledhill
2012	"We Are Young"	fun. featuring Janelle Monáe
2012	"We Are Young" (Alvin Risk Remix Part II)	fun. featuring Janelle Monáe
2012	"Make It Bun Dem"	Skrillex and Damian "Jr. Gong" Marley
2012	"Nemesis"	Neil Davidge
2012	"Messiah"	I See MONSTAS
2012	"Firestarter"	The Prodigy
2014	"Electro Remix"	Hans Zimmer & The Magnificent Six
