= Marc Cohn =

American singer-songwriter and musician (born 1959)

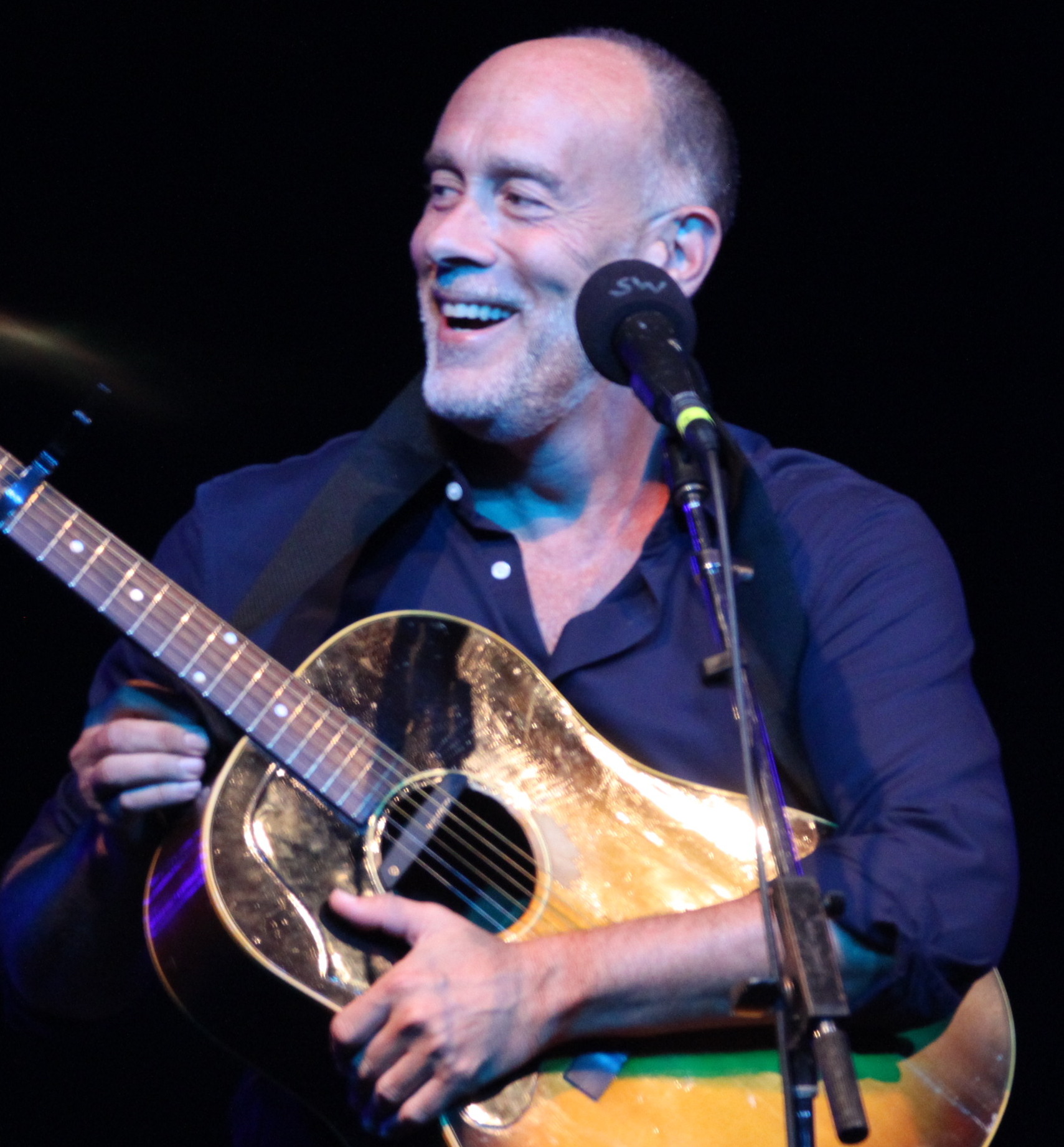
- Cohn in 2016

Background information
- Born: Marc Craig Cohn; July 5, 1959 (age 67); Cleveland, Ohio, U.S.
- Genres: Folk rock; pop
- Instruments: Vocals; keyboards; guitar
- Years active: 1986–1998, 2004–present
- Labels: Atlantic, Decca, Saguaro Road
- Website: www.marccohnmusic.com

Marc Craig Cohn (/koʊn/; born July 5, 1959) is an American singer-songwriter. He is best known for the song "Walking in Memphis", which was a top 40 hit from his 1991 album Marc Cohn and was nominated for Song of the Year and Best Pop Vocal at the 34th Annual Grammy Awards. His other charting singles include "Silver Thunderbird" (1991), "True Companion" (1991), and "Walk Through the World" (1993). Cohn won the Grammy Award for Best New Artist in 1992.

In 2019, the Observer-Dispatch wrote the following about Cohn: "Deeply rooted in American rhythm and blues, soul and gospel, gifted with a storyteller's eye and ear, and possessing one of the most expressive and soulful voices in modern music, Cohn draws from real-life to evoke common human feelings of love, hope, faith, joy and heartbreak".

== Early life ==
Cohn was born on July 5, 1959, in Cleveland, Ohio. He is Jewish. Cohn's mother, Sarane Cohn (née Meisel), died when he was two years old at the age of 44. His father, Harry A. Cohn, died when he was 13 at the age of 72. Following the deaths of his parents, Cohn was raised by his stepmother, Ruth H. Cohn (1914–2009). Cohn's older brothers are Alan, Warren, and Steven Samuel Cohn; Steven Samuel Cohn died in 2014 at the age of 66.

As a child, Cohn became "obsessed" with the Beatles, the Rolling Stones, Van Morrison, and the Band. He learned to play guitar and started writing songs when he was in junior high school, playing and singing with a local band called Doanbrook Hotel. In 1977, Cohn graduated from Beachwood High School in Beachwood, Ohio, a Cleveland suburb. While attending Oberlin College, he taught himself to play the piano.

== Career ==
Cohn transferred to UCLA and began to perform in Los Angeles-area coffeehouses. His early career featured work as a songwriter, as a session musician, and in a cover band called the Supreme Court. He played at Caroline Kennedy's wedding in 1986. Cohn played piano on Tracy Chapman's second album, Crossroads, and this experience led to him signing a contract with Atlantic Records.

Cohn released his debut solo album, Marc Cohn, in February 1991. The album was successful due to the hit single "Walking in Memphis". Cohn has said that "Walking in Memphis" is "100 percent autobiographical" and based on actual events that happened during his vacation to Memphis, Tennessee, which he hoped would help overcome a bout of writer's block. He has described it as a song about "a Jewish gospel-music-lover", and added that "the song is about more than just a place; it's about a kind of spiritual awakening, one of those trips where you're different when you leave." He was inspired to write "Walking in Memphis" by a 1985 visit to the Memphis, Tennessee, area. At the time, he was working as a session singer in New York City while pursuing a recording contract. "Walking in Memphis" was nominated for Song of the Year and Best Pop Vocal at the 34th Annual Grammy Awards and reached number 13 in 1991 on the Billboard Hot 100. As of 2016, it remains Cohn's only Top 40 hit.

Marc Cohn was certified gold by the RIAA in February 1992 and was certified platinum in 1996. The album featured two other charting singles: "Silver Thunderbird" and "True Companion". Cohn won the 1992 Grammy Award for Best New Artist.

In May 1993, Cohn released his second studio album, The Rainy Season, which included notable guest appearances by David Crosby, Graham Nash, and Bonnie Raitt. "Walk Through the World" (1993), the first song from that album, reached the Top 30 on Billboard's Adult Contemporary chart. Cohn released his third solo effort, Burning the Daze, in 1998. The compilation The Very Best of Marc Cohn was released in June 2006.

Cohn's track "Dance Back from the Grave", from the album Join the Parade (October 2007), relates to the events of Hurricane Katrina and to the post-traumatic stress Cohn suffered after being shot in the head in an attempted carjacking in August 2005.

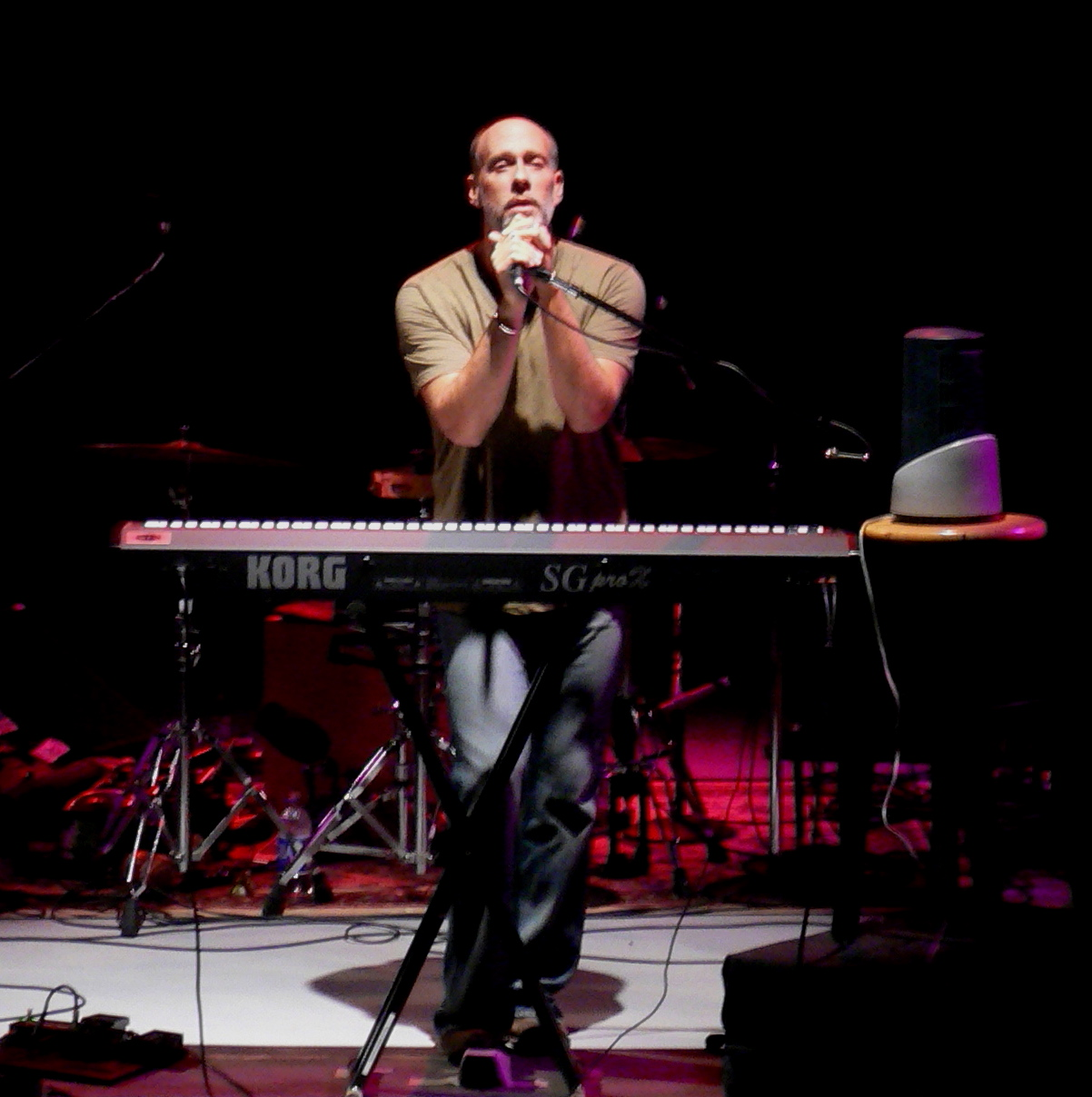
Marc Cohn performing in Saratoga, California, in July 2005

In 2010, Cohn returned with Listening Booth: 1970, a collection of covers of songs originally released during the titular year. The album peaked at number 28 on the Billboard 200 album chart. In addition to crossing genres from rock to soul to folk and pop, it featured vocal performances from India.Arie, Jim Lauderdale, Aimee Mann, and Kristina Train. As of September 2018, Listening Booth: 1970--which peaked at number 28--was Cohn's highest-charting album.

Cohn released his first original song in more than seven years, "The Coldest Corner in the World", in 2014. The song was the title track for the documentary Tree Man. Cohn released the album Careful What You Dream: Lost Songs and Rarities in 2016 in celebration of the 25th anniversary of his platinum-selling debut album. Cohn simultaneously released a bonus album, Evolution of a Record, which featured never-before-heard songs and demos. In 2017, Cohn worked with William Bell on his Grammy Award-winning album This Is Where I Live. He co-wrote several tracks on the album, including the opener, "The Three Of Me". Cohn also collaborated with the Blind Boys of Alabama on their Grammy-nominated song "Let My Mother Live".

In 2019, Cohn performed at Carnegie Hall at "The Music of Van Morrison" show, which benefited music education programs for the New York City school system. Other performers included Patti Smith, Glen Hansard, Bettye LaVette, Blind Boys of Alabama, and Josh Ritter. Cohn performed "Walking in Memphis" alongside Miley Cyrus at the 2019 Memphis in May Festival as part of the "More Together" Facebook campaign. "Walking in Memphis" was also the center of a national commercial for the "More Together" campaign. Cohn released Work to Do, a collaboration with the Blind Boys of Alabama, on August 9, 2019.

== Personal life ==
=== Marriages and children ===
Cohn married designer Jennifer George on May 20, 1988; she is a granddaughter of cartoonist Rube Goldberg. Cohn and George have two children; son Max, born c. 1991, and daughter Emily, born c. 1995. The marriage ended in divorce.

Cohn married American journalist Elizabeth Vargas on July 20, 2002. The pair met at the 1999 U.S. Open after Vargas sought an interview with Cohn's friend Andre Agassi. They have two sons, Zachary (born January 31, 2003) and Samuel (born August 16, 2006). Cohn and Vargas divorced in 2014, days after Vargas came out of rehabilitation for alcoholism for a third time.

Cohn married his third wife, Lisa Cohn, in late 2022.

=== Health ===
On August 7, 2005, Cohn was shot in the head during an attempted carjacking in Denver, Colorado while on a concert tour with Suzanne Vega. The bullet "barely missed Cohn's eye and lodged near his skull." Cohn survived and was hospitalized for observation, but was released after eight hours. According to Cohn, "Doctors told me I was the luckiest unlucky guy they had met in a long, long time." A police spokesperson surmised that the car's windshield may have significantly impeded the bullet's force, and added: "Frankly, I can't tell you how he survived." The shooter was sentenced to 36 years in prison after pleading guilty to attempted first-degree murder.

On January 30, 2025, Cohn announced that he had been diagnosed with Parkinson's disease about five years earlier.

== Awards ==
- 1991 American Music Awards – Nominated for Favorite New Artist – Adult Contemporary
- 1992 Grammy Awards – Winner for Best New Artist
- 1992 Grammy Awards – Nominated for Pop Male Vocalist for "Walking in Memphis"
- 1992 Grammy Awards – Nominated for Song of the Year for "Walking in Memphis"

== Discography ==
=== Albums ===
Title	Album details	Peak chart positions					Certifications (sales thresholds)
Title	Album details	US	AUS	CAN	GER	UK	Certifications (sales thresholds)
Marc Cohn	Release date: February 12, 1991; Label: Atlantic Records	38	31	15	14	27	RIAA: Platinum; ARIA: Gold; BPI: Gold; MC: Gold
The Rainy Season	Release date: May 25, 1993; Label: Atlantic Records	63	121	46	60	24	
Burning the Daze	Release date: March 17, 1998; Label: Atlantic Records	114	—	—	64	153	
Join the Parade	Release date: October 9, 2007; Label: Decca Records	—	—	—	—	—	
Listening Booth: 1970	Release date: July 20, 2010; Label: Saguaro Road Records	28	—	81	86	—	
"—" denotes releases that did not chart

=== Live albums ===
Title	Album details
Marc Cohn Live: Special Limited Edition EP	Release date: 2004 or 2005; Label: Self-released
Marc Cohn Live 04/05	Release date: 2005; Label: United Musicians
Join the Parade: Live EP	Release date: 2008; Label: Miles Away Records
Work to Do	Release date: August 9, 2019; Label: BMG

=== Compilation albums ===
Title	Album details
The Very Best of Marc Cohn	Release date: June 20, 2006; Label: Atlantic/WEA
Careful What You Dream: Lost Songs and Rarities	Release date: March 25, 2016; Label: Marc Cohn

=== EPs ===
- Hi-Five: Marc Cohn (2005)

=== Singles ===
Year	Single	Peak chart positions										Certifications	Album
Year	Single	US	US AC	US Main	US Country	AUS	CAN	CAN AC	GER	IRL	UK	Certifications	Album
1986	"The Heart of the City"	—	—	—	—	—	—	—	—	—	—		Non-album single, Morning Records 1067
1991	"Walking in Memphis"	13	12	7	74	11	3	5	25	7	66		Marc Cohn
1991	"Silver Thunderbird"	63	—	22	—	107	31	18	87	28	54		Marc Cohn
1991	"Walking in Memphis" (UK re-issue)	—	—	—	—	—	—	—	—	16	22	BPI: Platinum	Marc Cohn
1991	"True Companion"	80	24	—	—	117	—	—	—	—	100		Marc Cohn
1991	"29 Ways"	—	—	—	—	—	—	—	—	—	—		Marc Cohn
1992	"Ghost Train"	—	—	—	—	121	—	—	74	—	—		Marc Cohn
1992	"Strangers in a Car"	—	—	—	—	—	—	—	—	—	—		Marc Cohn
1993	"Walk Through the World" b/w "Old Soldier" / "One Thing of Beauty" (non-album tracks)	121	28	—	—	129	26	20	51	—	37		The Rainy Season
1993	"Paper Walls"	—	—	—	—	—	—	—	—	—	—		The Rainy Season
1993	"The Rainy Season"	—	—	—	—	—	—	—	—	—	—		The Rainy Season
1995	"Turn on Your Radio"	—	—	—	—	—	—	—	—	—	—		For Love of Harry: Everybody Sings Nilsson / Burning the Daze
1998	"Already Home"	—	—	—	—	—	—	—	—	—	—		Burning the Daze
1998	"Healing Hands"	—	—	—	—	—	—	—	—	—	—		Burning the Daze
1998	"Lost You in the Canyon"	—	—	—	—	—	—	—	—	—	—		Burning the Daze
2007	"Listening to Levon"	—	—	—	—	—	—	—	—	—	—		Join the Parade
2010	"Look at Me"	—	—	—	—	—	—	—	—	—	—		Listening Booth: 1970
2010	"Wild World"	—	—	—	—	—	—	—	—	—	—		Listening Booth: 1970
2014	"The Coldest Corner in the World"	—	—	—	—	—	—	—	—	—	—		Non-album single
2019	"Work to Do"	—	—	—	—	—	—	—	—	—	—		Work to Do
"—" denotes releases that did not chart
