= Niki & the Dove =

Swedish indietronica duo

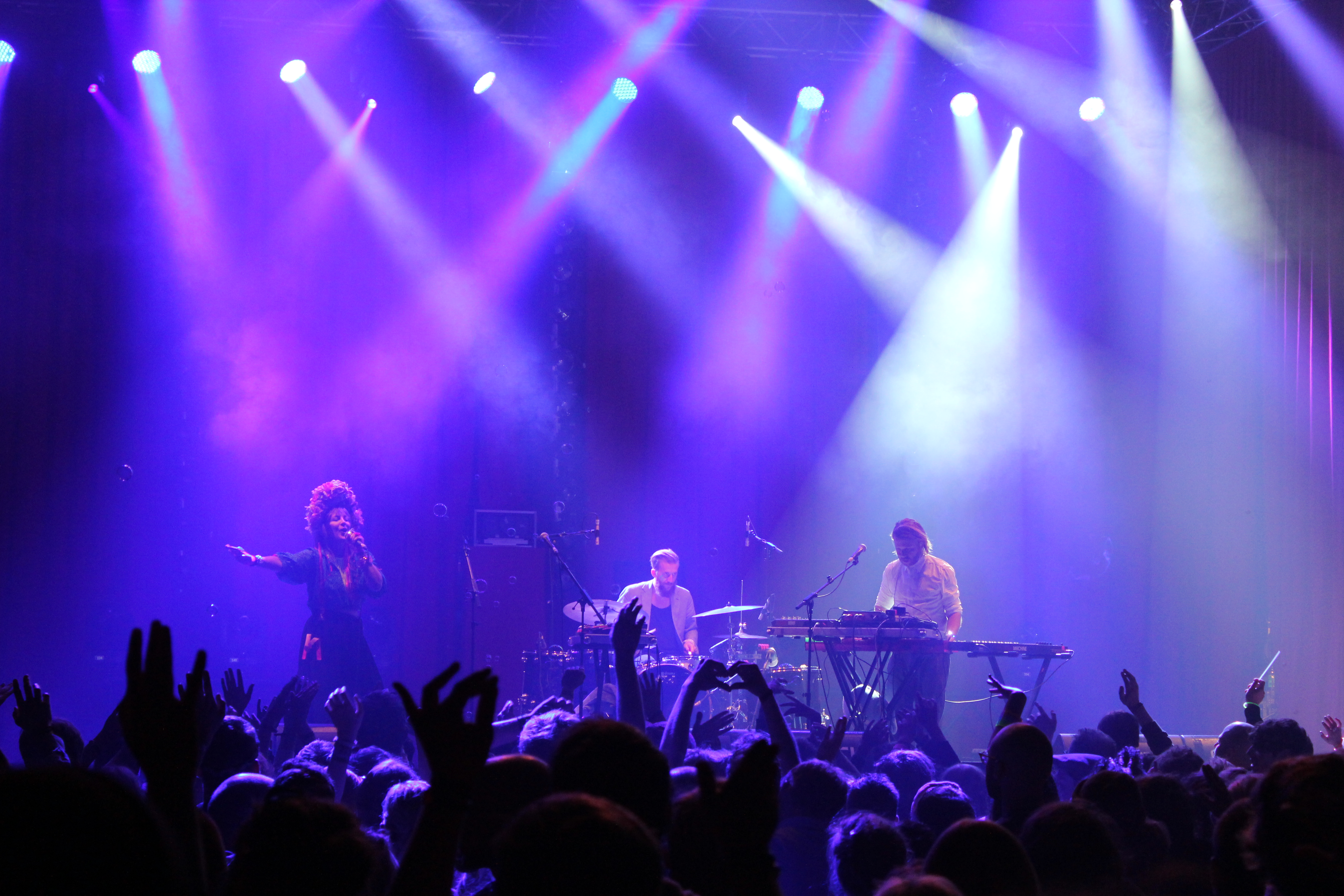
- Niki & the Dove performing in 2012

Background information
- Origin: Stockholm, Sweden
- Genres: Futurepop; indietronica; alternative dance; synth-pop
- Years active: 2010–present
- Labels: TEN; Sub Pop; Mercury
- Members: Malin Dahlström; Gustaf Karlöf
- Website: nikiandthedove.com

Niki & the Dove are a Swedish indietronica duo from Stockholm, formed in February 2010. The group consists of Malin Dahlström (vocals and production) and Gustaf Karlöf (production), and are signed by TEN Music Group, licensed to Sub Pop and Mercury Records. On 5 December 2011, the BBC announced that the duo had been nominated for the BBC's Sound of 2012 poll, which they ultimately finished in fifth place.

== Discography ==
=== Studio albums ===
| Title | Details | Peak chart positions | |
| Title | Details | SWE | UK |
|---|---|---|---|
| Instinct | Released: 14 May 2012; Label: TEN, Sub Pop, Mercury; Formats: CD, LP, digital download | 60 | 60 |
| Everybody's Heart Is Broken Now | Released: 8 April 2016; Label: TEN; Formats: CD, LP, digital download | — | — |

=== EPs ===
| Title | Details |
|---|---|
| The Drummer | Released: 13 October 2011; Label: Sub Pop, Mercury; Format: Digital download |
| This Is the Music (with the Greys) | Released: 30 June 2023; Label: Amuseio; Format: Digital download |

=== Singles ===
| Title | Year | Peak chart positions | | | | | | Album |
| Title | Year | SWE | EST Air. | LAT Air. | LTU Air. | SVK Air. | UK | Album |
|---|---|---|---|---|---|---|---|---|
| "The Fox" | 2011 | — | * | | | — | — | Instinct |
| "DJ, Ease My Mind" | 2012 | — | * | | | — | 103 | Instinct |
| "Tomorrow" | 2012 | — | * | | | — | — | Instinct |
| "Somebody" | 2012 | — | * | | | — | — | Instinct |
| "Love to the Test" | 2012 | — | * | | | — | — | Instinct |
| "Play It on My Radio" | 2015 | — | * | | | — | — | Everybody's Heart Is Broken Now |
| "So Much It Hurts" | 2016 | — | * | | | — | — | Everybody's Heart Is Broken Now |
| "Coconut Kiss" | 2017 | — | * | | | — | — | Everybody's Heart Is Broken Now |
| "Sushi King" | 2017 | — | * | | | — | — | Non-album singles |
| "Galvanize" | 2021 | — | * | | | — | — | Non-album singles |
| "Gloria" (with the Greys) | 2023 | — | — | — | — | — | — | This Is the Music |
| "Police" (with the Greys) | 2023 | — | — | — | — | — | — | This Is the Music |
| "Lioness" (with Swedish House Mafia) | 2024 | 87 | 31 | 1 | 15 | 63 | — | Non-album single |
| "The Kiss" | 2026 | — | — | — | — | — | — | TBA |
"—" denotes items which were not released in that country or failed to chart. "*" denotes the chart did not exist at that time.

=== Promotional singles ===
| Title | Year | Album |
|---|---|---|
| "Mother Protect" | 2012 | Instinct |

== Music videos ==
| Title | Year | References |
|---|---|---|
| "DJ, Ease My Mind (version one) | 2010 | |
| "Under the Bridges" | 2010 | |
| "The Drummer" | 2011 | |
| "Mother Protect" | 2011 | |
| "DJ, Ease My Mind" (version two) | 2011 | |
| "The Fox" | 2012 | |
| "Tomorrow" | 2012 | |
| "Play It on My Radio" | 2015 | |
| "So Much It Hurts" | 2016 | |

== Tours ==
- NME Radar Tour (2011) (as supporting act)
- Hurts Tour (2011) (as supporting act)

== Awards and nominations ==
| Year | Organisation | Award | Result |
|---|---|---|---|
| 2011 | BBC Sound of 2012 | Sound of 2012 | Fifth |
| 2016 | Electro Wow Music Blog | "So Much It Hurts" – Best Electro Pop Track of 2016 | Winner |
