= Machine Soul: An Odyssey Into Electronic Dance Music =

Compilation album by Various Artists
- Released: March 14, 2000
- Genre: Electronic dance music
- Length: 144:43
- Label: Rhino

Machine Soul: An Odyssey Into Electronic Dance Music is a compilation album released by Rhino Records on March 14, 2000. The album explores electronic dance music through various genres and received positive reviews from critics including AllMusic, Entertainment Weekly, and Uncut.

== Production ==
The album was initially conceived as a four-disc set, but was cut down to two discs.

== Release ==
Machine Soul: An Odyssey Into Electronic Dance Music was released by Rhino Records on compact disc on March 14, 2000. The album contains liner notes from Johan Kugelberg which include an essay on electronic music and covers music not included on the album.

== Reception ==
Professional ratings
Review scores
Source	Rating
AllMusic	5/5 stars
The Austin Chronicle	4/5 stars
Entertainment Weekly	B+

The Austin Chronicle declared the album to be "the most comprehensive and accessible attempt at tracing the lineage of electronic music (since the Seventies, anyway) yet delivered." The Advocate commented on how the album could be used as an educational tool for young electronic music fans, and as a strong example of varied electronic dance music is. AllMusic gave the album five stars, suggesting that some electronic music fans may be upset with the number of tracks led by vocals where the vast majority of electronic dance music has none, but concluded that the release was "an excellent definition of the genre."

Entertainment Weekly opined that the album was "A flawed but nonetheless ambitious anthology on a scale never attempted before", noting that it lacked key tracks to represent the genre and its history fully. SF Weekly discussed the song choices for the album, noting that Rhino opted "for obvious choices (Kraftwerk, New Order, Donna Summer), throwaways (Sparks, Gary Numan's 'Cars'), and, worst of all, songs unrepresentative of the culture's underground rep—OMD and Depeche Mode are the Top 40's old news, and the Orb's 'Little Fluffy Clouds' has been invalidated by that damn Volkswagen ad. That leaves little opportunity to cram some cred into the tail end of the second disc (BT, Paul Van Dyk) and an overall sense that Rhino's just cashing in on Fatboy Slim, and poorly at that." The review found the release lacking in comparison to Tommy Boy's The Perfect Beats series, which "succeeds mainly because it focuses on the close ties between techno and hip-hop." British critic Ian MacDonald wrote that the track listing "works efficiently" but slightly overrepresents American artists, pointing to "the inclusion of L.A. Style's 'James Brown Is Dead' rather than a shot of UK hardcore 1991 or some drum and bass".

== Track listing ==
Credits adapted from the liner notes of the album.

=== Disc one ===
1. Kraftwerk – "The Robots" (Florian Schneider, Karl Bartos, Ralf Hütter)
2. The Normal – "Warm Leatherette" (Daniel Miller)
3. Donna Summer – "I Feel Love" (Donna Summer, Giorgio Moroder, Pete Bellotte)
4. Sparks – "The Number One Song In Heaven" (Giorgio Moroder, Ron Mael, Russell Mael)
5. Orchestral Manoeuvres in the Dark – "Electricity" (Andy McCluskey, Paul Humphreys)
6. Gary Numan – "Cars" (Gary Numan)
7. Throbbing Gristle – "Adrenalin" (Throbbing Gristle)
8. Cabaret Voltaire – "Yashar" (Richard H. Kirk, Stephen Mallinder)
9. Afrika Bambaataa & The Soul Sonic Force – "Planet Rock" (Afrika Bambaataa, Arthur Baker, Ellis Williams, John B. Miller, Robert Allen)
10. Newcleus – "Jam On Revenge" (Maurice B. Cenac)
11. Cybotron – "Clear" (3070, Juan Atkins)
12. New Order – "Blue Monday" (Bernard Sumner, Gillian Gilbert, Peter Hook, Stephen Morris)
13. Rhythim Is Rhythim – "Strings Of Life" (Derrick May, Mike James)

=== Disc two ===
1. M/A/R/R/S – "Pump Up The Volume (Radio Edit)" (Martin Young, Steve Young)
2. Inner City – "Big Fun" (Arthur Forrest, James Pennington, Kevin Saunderson, Paris Grey)
3. Depeche Mode – "Enjoy The Silence (Single Mix)" (Martin L. Gore)
4. The KLF – "What Time Is Love? (Live At Trancentral Mix)" (William Drummond, Isaac Bello, James Cauty, L. McFarland)
5. The Orb – "Little Fluffy Clouds (Dance Mix Mk I Edit)" (Alex Paterson, Martin Glover)
6. Moby – "Go" (Richard Hall)
7. The Shamen – "Move Any Mountain (I.R.P. In The Land Of Oz Remix)" (Colin Angus, Richard West, Shamen)
8. L.A. Style – "James Brown Is Dead (7" Version)" (Denzil Slemming)
9. The Prodigy – "Charly (Alley Cat Mix)" (Liam Howlett)
10. Underworld – "Rez" (Darren Emerson, Karl Hyde, Rick Smith)
11. The Chemical Brothers – "Life Is Sweet" (Ed Simons, Tim Burgess, Tom Rowlands)
12. Fluke – "Absurd (Mighty Dub Katz Vox Mix)" (Fluke)
13. Überzone – "2Kool4Skool (Short)" (Bambaataa, Williams, Miller, Timothy Wiles)
14. Paul van Dyk – "For an Angel (PVD Angel In Heaven Radio Mix)" (Paul van Dyk)
15. BT – "Godspeed (BT Edit Mix)" (Brian Transeau)
