= Respect M.E. =

Greatest hits album by Missy Elliott
- Released: September 4, 2006
- Recorded: 1997–2005
- Length: 68:27
- Label: Goldmind; Violator; Atlantic
- Producer: Missy Elliott; Craig Brockman; Warryn Campbell; Nisan Stewart; Timbaland; Rhemario Webber

Missy Elliott chronology
The Cookbook (2005)	Respect M.E. (2006)	Iconology (2019)

Singles from Respect M.E.
- 1. "We Run This" Released: August 21, 2006

Respect M.E. (short for Respect Missy Elliott) is the first greatest hits album by American rapper Missy Elliott. It was released by Atlantic Records on September 4, 2006, in Europe, Asia and Australia. The album includes a collection of the singles from across all six of her studio albums, released between 1997 and 2005, most of which were produced by Elliott along with Timbaland, with "We Run This", the third single from her 2005 album The Cookbook also serving as Respect M.E.'s lead single.

Upon release, the album earned favorable reviews from music critics who ranked it among the best hip hop compilations be released in the early to mid-2000s. A moderate commercial success, it became Elliott's second top ten album on the UK Albums Chart and her highest-charting album to date, peaking at number seven. Respect M.E. also reached the top in New Zealand and was later certified Gold in Ireland, New Zealand, and the United Kingdom.

== Background ==
Respect M.E. compromises a collection of Elliott's singles from across all six of her studio albums, released between 1997 and 2005. Missing from the collection is the single "Take Away" from her third album Miss E... So Addictive (2001). Speculation about two new tracks on the album began soon after its announcement. Two tracks called "123" and "Magnifica" were supposed to be included. "123" was even able to be pre-ordered as a CD single from UK music store HMV. However, these songs did not make the album.

== Critical reception ==
Professional ratings
Review scores
Source	Rating
AllMusic	5/5 stars
Gigwise	8/10 stars
MusicOMH	4/5 stars
Pitchfork	9.2/10
The Skinny	8/10 stars

AllMusic editor Andy Kellman rated the album five out of five stars and called it "one of the great decade-long singles runs is straightforwardly documented." He found that "although each one of Elliott's albums is well worth owning, nothing can deny the need for this release, which includes almost every noteworthy track she released during the period [...] During these years, there was no greater force in popular music." Pitchfork critic Jess Harvell noted that Respect M.E. is "the long-awaited — and long-deserved – best of. It is, amazingly, only being released in Europe. This is unconscionable. The suits at Missy's American label need to have their knuckles rapped, Catechism-style."

Fiona Jerome from MusicOMH called Respect M.E. a "great greatest hits package [...]. Pruning perhaps four numbers from it would raise it from four to five stars, but that is a minor niggle. From the soulful phrasings of the charmingly dirty "Minute Man" to the magnificent, symphonic shifts of "Lose Control," Respect M.E. is a testament to a truly gifted woman." Gigwise's Will Lavin felt that "no greatest hits collection released in the last few years has come even close to this satisfactory collection of hot Missy Elliot records [...] Elliot is an icon, there's absolutely no doubt about it." Alex Burden from The Skinny called it "a powerhouse of an album."

== Chart performance ==
Respect M.E. debuted and peaked at number seven on the UK Albums Chart. This marked Elliott's highest-charting album yet. On September 29, 2006, it was certified Gold by the British Phonographic Industry (BPI), for sales of over 100,000 units in the United Kingdom. Elsewhere, the album reached the top ten in New Zealand, also peaking at number seven.

== Track listing ==
Respect M.E. track listing
No.	Title	Writer(s)	Original album	Length
1.	"Get Ur Freak On"	Melissa Elliott; Timothy Mosley	Miss E... So Addictive, 2001	3:57
2.	"Lose Control" (featuring Ciara and Fat Man Scoop)	Elliott; Ciara Harris; G. Isaacs III; Juan Atkins; Richard Davis; Curtis Hudson	The Cookbook, 2005	3:47
3.	"4 My People" (Basement Jaxx remix)	Elliott; Mosley; Craig Brockman; Nisan Stewart; Dante Nolan; Eve Jeffers	Miss E... So Addictive	3:32
4.	"We Run This"	Elliott; Rhemario Webber; Jerry Lordan	The Cookbook	3:24
5.	"Work It"	Elliott; Mosley	Under Construction, 2002	4:24
6.	"Gossip Folks" (featuring Ludacris)	Elliott; Mosley; Christopher Bridges	Under Construction	3:57
7.	"One Minute Man" (featuring Ludacris)	Elliott; Mosley; Bridges	Miss E... So Addictive	4:13
8.	"I'm Really Hot"	Elliott; Mosley	This Is Not a Test!, 2003	3:31
9.	"Pass That Dutch"	Elliott; Mosley	This Is Not a Test!	3:41
10.	"Beep Me 911" (featuring 702 and Magoo)	Elliott; Mosley; Melvin Barcliff	Supa Dupa Fly, 1997	4:58
11.	"The Rain (Supa Dupa Fly)"	Elliott; Mosley; Ann Peebles; Bernard Miller; Don Bryant	Supa Dupa Fly	4:06
12.	"All n My Grill" (featuring Big Boi and Nicole)	Elliott; Mosley; Antwan Patton	Da Real World, 1999	4:32
13.	"Hit Em wit da Hee" (featuring Lil' Kim and Mocha)	Elliott; Mosley; Kimberly Jones	Supa Dupa Fly	4:20
14.	"Hot Boyz"	Elliott; Mosley	Da Real World	3:36
15.	"Sock It 2 Me" (featuring Da Brat)	Elliott; Mosley; William Hart; Thom Bell; Shawntae Harris	Supa Dupa Fly	4:17
16.	"She's a Bitch"	Elliott; Mosley	Da Real World	4:00
17.	"Teary Eyed"	Elliott; Warryn Campbell	The Cookbook	3:40
Total length:				68:27

== Personnel ==
- Timbaland – production (tracks 1, 5–16)
- Missy Elliott – production (tracks 2, 8, 9)
- D-Man – production (track 3)
- Nisan Stewart – production (track 3)
- Rhemario Webber – production (track 4)
- Warryn Campbell – production (track 17)

== Charts ==
=== Weekly charts ===
Weekly chart performance for Respect M.E.
Chart (2006)	Peak position
Australian Albums (ARIA)	26
Austrian Albums (Ö3 Austria)	42
Belgian Albums (Ultratop Flanders)	37
Belgian Albums (Ultratop Wallonia)	66
Danish Albums (Hitlisten)	27
Dutch Albums (Album Top 100)	54
German Albums (Offizielle Top 100)	40
Irish Albums (IRMA)	11
Italian Albums (FIMI)	64
Japanese Albums (Oricon)	17
New Zealand Albums (RMNZ)	7
Scottish Albums (OCC)	23
Swiss Albums (Schweizer Hitparade)	25
Taiwanese Albums (Five Music)	8
UK Albums (OCC)	7

=== Year-end charts ===
Year-end chart performance for Respect M.E.
Chart (2006)	Position
Australian Urban Albums (ARIA)	27

== Certifications ==
Certifications for Respect M.E.
Region	Certification	Certified units/sales
Ireland (IRMA)	Gold	7,500^{^}
New Zealand (RMNZ)	Gold	7,500^{^}
United Kingdom (BPI)	Gold	100,000^{^}
^{^} Shipments figures based on certification alone.
