= National Arts Awards =

The National Arts Awards are presented by Americans for the Arts annually during National Arts & Humanities Month to distinguish private sector arts leadership.

== Categories ==
The National Arts Awards are divided into the following categories:

- Arts Advocacy Award is presented to a noted artist or arts advocate with a track record of advocating for the arts.
- Arts Education Award is presented to a noted artist or arts advocate with a track record of contributing to the advancement of arts education.
- Corporate Citizenship in the Arts Award is presented to a high-profile, major corporate leader with a record of contributing to arts and cultural institutions or initiatives.
- Eli and Edythe Broad Award for Philanthropy in the Arts is presented to an individual with a demonstrable history of philanthropic giving to one or more major arts institutions.
- Isabella and Theodor Dalenson Lifetime Achievement Award is presented to a nationally recognized, established artist with a lifetime of exemplary artistic accomplishment in his or her field.
- The Bell Family Foundation Young Artist Award is presented to an individual who has achieved incredible accomplishments and exemplary leadership while still early in their careers.
- Outstanding Contributions to the Arts celebrates the artistic excellence of an established artist or arts advocate.
- Kitty Carlisle Hart Award, Outstanding Contribution to the Arts Award, was awarded by the Arts & Business Council from 1996 to 2004, it became part of the National Arts Awards in 2005.

== Recipients ==
Not all categories are awarded each year

=== Recipients before 1998 ===
==== Arnold Gingrich Memorial Award ====
- Marian Anderson
- George Balanchine
- Leonard Bernstein
- Hume Cronyn
- Agnes DeMille
- Martha Graham
- Helen Hayes
- Lincoln Kirstein
- Arthur Mitchell
- Jessye Norman
- William S. Paley
- Joseph Papp
- Itzhak Perlman
- Jason Robards
- Beverly Sills
- Neil Simon
- Stephen Sondheim
- Isaac Stern
- Jessica Tandy
- Billy Taylor
- Lila Acheson Wallace

==== Arts Advocacy Award ====
- Christopher Reeve

==== Arts Education Award ====
- Martina Arroyo
- Wynton Marsalis
- Arthur Mitchell

==== Corporate Citizenship in the Arts ====
- American Express
- AT&T
- FleetBoston Financial Corp.
- General Electric
- IBM Corporation
- JP Morgan Chase & Co.
- The Hearst Corporation
- The McGraw-Hill Companies
- Time Warner/Gerald Levin
- VH1

==== Featured Artist ====
- Julie Mehretu
- Jeff Koons
- Kenny Scharf

==== Kitty Carlisle Hart Award ====
Awarded by the Arts & Business Council from 1996 to 2004, it became part of the National Arts Awards in 2005.

- Edward Albee
- Richard Avedon (2003)
- Will Barnet
- Mikhail Baryshnikov
- Harry Belafonte
- Chuck Close
- Betty Comden & Adolf Green
- Barbara Cook
- Merce Cunningham
- Renée Fleming
- Hugh Hardy
- Al Hirschfeld
- Judith Jamison
- Peter Martins
- Yoko Ono
- Nam June Paik
- Gordon Parks (2001)
- James Stewart Polshek
- Harold Prince
- Robert Rauschenberg
- Martin Scorsese
- Anna Deavere Smith
- Paul Taylor

==== Lifetime Achievement Award ====
- Jason Robards
- Beverly Sills

==== Special Recognition ====
- Rep. John Brademas
- Rep. Amory Houghton, Jr.
- Rep. Jerrold Nadler

=== 1998 ===
- Alec Baldwin, Arts Advocacy Award
- Midori Gotō, Arts Education Award
- Isaac Stern, Colleen Dewhurst Lifetime Achievement Award
- Hugh McColl, Corporate Citizen Award
- Michael H. Jordan and CBS, Special tribute for outstanding vision and exemplary contributions to the arts in America

=== 1999 ===
- Hillary Clinton, Arts Advocacy Award
- Agnes Gund, Arts Education Award
- Sanford I. Weill, Corporate Citizen Award
- Jacob Lawrence, Lifetime Achievement Award
- Brooke Astor, Philanthropy Award

=== 2000 ===
- Wendy Wasserstein, Arts Advocacy Award
- Peter I. Bijur, Corporate Citizen Award
- Frank Gehry and Thomas Krens, Lifetime Achievement Award
- Jo Carole Lauder, Philanthropy Award
- Uma Thurman, Young Artist Special Recognition Award

=== 2001 ===
- Peter Martins, Artistic Leadership Award
- Michael Greene, Arts Advocacy Award
- The Honorable Schuyler Chapin, Arts Education Award
- Robert H. Benmosche, Corporate Citizen Award
- Richard Meier, Lifetime Achievement Award

=== 2002 ===
- Cindy Sherman, Artistic Excellence
- Alberto Vilar, Corporate Citizenship in the Arts
- David Rockefeller, Frederick R. Weisman Award for Philanthropy in the Arts
- Pinchas Zukerman, Isaac Stern Award for Excellence in Classical Music
- Dr. Robert S. Martin, Special Recognition for 25 Years of Service
- Kathleen A. Dore, Special Recognition for Excellence in Arts & Media
- Natalie Portman, Young Artist Award

=== 2003 ===
- Christo and Jeanne-Claude, Artistic Leadership
- Dr. Vance D. Coffman, Corporate Citizenship in the Arts
- Teresa Heinz, Frederick R. Weisman Award for Philanthropy in the Arts
- Richard Avedon, Lifetime Achievement
- Kirk Varnedoe, Special Memorial Tribute for Extraordinary Contributions to the Arts
- Sofia Coppola, Young Artist Award for Artistic Excellence

=== 2004 ===
- Chuck Close, Artistic Leadership and Arts Advocacy
- A.G. Lafley, Procter & Gamble, Corporate Citizenship in the Arts
- Raymond Nasher, Frederick R. Weisman Award for Philanthropy in the Arts
- Paul Taylor, Lifetime Achievement
- William Bassell, Principal, Long Island City High School, Special Arts Education Recognition Award
- Mena Suvari, Young Artist Award for Artistic Excellence

=== 2005 ===
- Pierre Dulaine and Yvonne Marceau, Arts Education Award
- Target Corporation, Corporate Citizenship in the Arts
- Eli Broad, Frederick R. Weisman Award for Philanthropy in the Arts
- Mikhail Baryshnikov, Kitty Carlisle Hart Award for Outstanding Contribution to the Arts
- John Baldessari, Lifetime Achievement Award
- Kerry Washington, Young Artist Award

=== 2006 ===
- Jeff Koons, Artistic Achievement Award
- United Technologies Corporation, Corporate Citizenship in the Arts Award
- Sheila C. Johnson, Frederick R. Weisman Award for Philanthropy in the Arts
- Aretha Franklin, Lifetime Achievement Award
- Kitty Carlisle Hart, Special Recognition for Outstanding Contributions to the Arts
- Jake Gyllenhaal, Young Artist Award

=== 2007 ===
- Music Industry and NAMM, Corporate Citizenship in the Arts Award
- Wallis Annenberg, Frederick R. Weisman Award for Philanthropy in the Arts
- Anna Deavere Smith, Kitty Carlisle Hart Award for Outstanding Contributions to the Arts
- Ellsworth Kelly, Lifetime Achievement Award
- The United States Conference of Mayors, Special Recognition in Honor of Its 75th Anniversary
- John Legend, Young Artist Award for Artistic Excellence

=== 2008 ===
- Phil Ramone, Arts Advocacy Award
- The Principal Financial Group, Corporate Citizenship in the Arts Award
- Joan W. Harris, Frederick R. Weisman Award for Philanthropy
- Yoko Ono, Kitty Carlisle Hart Award for Outstanding Contributions to the Arts
- Dame Julie Andrews, Lifetime Achievement Award
- Kehinde Wiley, Young Artist Award for Artistic Excellence

=== 2009 ===
- Ed Ruscha, Artistic Excellence Award
- Anne Finucane, Bank of America, Corporate Citizenship in the Arts Award
- Sidney Harman, Frederick R. Weisman Award for Philanthropy in the Arts
- Salman Rushdie, Kitty Carlisle Hart Award for Outstanding Contributions to the Arts
- Robert Redford, Lifetime Achievement Award

=== 2010 ===
- Martha Rivers Ingram, Eli and Edythe Broad Award for Philanthropy in the Arts
- Angela Lansbury, Lifetime Achievement Award
- Kate and Laura Mulleavy, Rodarte, Maria and Bill Bell Young Artist Award
- Herb Alpert, Outstanding Contributions to the Arts Award

=== 2011 ===
- Frank Stella, Isabella and Theodor Dalenson Lifetime Achievement Award
- Jenny Holzer, Outstanding Contributions to the Arts
- President's Committee on the Arts and Humanities, Arts Education Award
- Gabourey Sidibe, Bell Family Foundation Young Artist Award
- Beverley Taylor Sorenson, Eli and Edythe Broad Award for Philanthropy in the Arts
- Wells Fargo & Company, Corporate Citizenship in the Arts Award

=== 2012 ===
- Paul G. Allen, Eli and Edythe Broad Award for Philanthropy in the Arts
- James Rosenquist, Isabella and Theodor Dalenson Lifetime Achievement Award
- Brian Stokes Mitchell, Outstanding Contributions to the Arts Award
- Josh Groban, Bell Family Foundation Young Artist Award
- Lin Arison, Arts Education Award
- Axa Art Insurance Corporation, Corporate Citizenship in the Arts Award

=== 2013 ===
- Dakota Fanning - Bell Family Foundation Young Artist Award
- B.B. King – Isabella and Theodor Dalenson Lifetime Achievement Award
- John and Mary Pappajohn – Eli & Edythe Broad Award for Philanthropy in the Arts
- Joel Shapiro – Outstanding Contributions to the Arts Award
- Alberto Carvalho – Arts Education Award

=== 2014 ===
- Richard Serra - Lifetime Achievement Award
- David Hallberg - Bell Family Foundation Young Artist Award
- Norie Sato - Public Art Network Award
- Malissa Feruzzi Shriver - Arts Education Award

=== 2015 ===
- Lady Gaga - Young Artist Award

=== 2016 ===
- Doug Aitken - Outstanding Contributions to the Arts Award
- Esperanza Spalding - Ted Arison Young Artist Award
