= The Cookbook =

Studio album by Missy Elliott
- Released: July 4, 2005
- Studios: The Hit Factory Criteria (Miami, FL); Platinum Sound Studios (New York, NY); Flyte Tyme West (Santa Monica, CA); South Beach Studios (Miami, FL); Record Plant (Los Angeles, CA); J Studio (Atlanta, GA)
- Genres: Hip hop; R&B; soul
- Length: 63:13
- Labels: Goldmind; Violator; Atlantic
- Producers: Missy Elliott; Associates; The Avila Brothers; Bangladesh; Craig Brockman; Warryn Campbell; El Loco; Qur'an H. Goodman; Rich Harrison; Keith Lewis; Saint Nick; Scott Storch; Timbaland; Rhemario Webber; The Neptunes

Missy Elliott chronology
This Is Not a Test! (2003)	The Cookbook (2005)	Respect M.E. (2006)

Singles from The Cookbook
- 1. "Lose Control" Released: May 23, 2005; 2. "Teary Eyed" Released: September 12, 2005; 3. "We Run This" Released: March 20, 2006

The Cookbook is the sixth studio album by American rapper Missy Elliott, released on July 4, 2005, by The Goldmind Inc. and Atlantic Records in Germany and the United Kingdom, and on July 5 in the United States and Japan. To date, it is her final long play studio effort.

Three singles were released from the album; the first, "Lose Control", was released on May 23, 2005, and peaked at number three on the Billboard Hot 100 chart and charted well internationally. The second single, "Teary Eyed", was released on September 12, 2005, and failed to chart on any Billboard chart and charted low in other countries. The third single, "We Run This", was released on March 20, 2006, and peaked at number forty-eight on the Billboard Hot 100 and charted moderately well internationally.

The album received generally favorable reviews from critics. The album debuted at number two on the US Billboard 200 chart. The album was certified platinum by the Recording Industry Association of America (RIAA). It received a Grammy nomination for Best Rap Album, ultimately losing to Kanye West's Late Registration. The music video for "Lose Control", directed by Dave Meyers won the Grammy for Best Short Form Music Video.

== Background ==
The title The Cookbook derived of Elliott feeling "no two records are going to sound alike; each record has its own spices and herbs. Each record is cooking up a hot recipe for a hot album." The black and white cover features Elliott posing with a vintage microphone in a 1920s juke joint. She explained the cover, saying, "I wanted people to see I was taking music back to the roots—not just hip hop, but our ancestors. Whether they was on railroad tracks or cooking in somebody's kitchen, they was always singing."

In an interview with Billboard magazine, Elliott said, "I really do think this is my best album. I was in a really great space with this album. I wasn't in a great space with some of the other albums I've done." She went on to say, "I played Lil' Kim the album the other day, and she told me it was incredible and that there was not one song on it that she didn't like."

== Recording ==
In January 2005, it was revealed Elliott had been working on a new album. Two months later, Ciara confirmed she would appear on the album, singing and rapping on the potential first untitled single at the time. Elliott worked on The Cookbook with such producers as the Neptunes, Rich Harrison and Scott Storch. The album included only two songs produced by Timbaland, who produced most or all songs on Elliott's previous albums. She explained, "Me and Tim, this like our sixth album, so if we go any further left, we gonna be on Mars somewhere. We've done everything it is to do. I think both of us came to a spot where we didn't know where to go with each other." She said Timbaland was very involved with the album, supporting or opposing certain producers. Elliott went on to say, "I was eight songs deep and I let Tim listen and he was like, 'Nah, you're going in the wrong direction. You trippin'.' I had to go back in the studio and come up with new records. [When he heard those], he was like, 'This is the Missy people are listening to.'"

== Singles ==
The first, "Lose Control", was released on May 23, 2005, and peaked at number three on the Billboard Hot 100 chart, number six on the Billboard Hot R&B/Hip-Hop Songs and number two on the Billboard Pop 100. The single also peaked at number two on the New Zealand RIANZ Singles Chart and in the top ten in four other countries. A Dave Meyers-directed promotional video accompanied the song; it was the most played video on BET and MTV2 and second most played video in the United States. It went on to win a Grammy Award for Best Short Form Music Video, while the song itself received a nomination for Best Rap Song.

The second single, "Teary Eyed", was released on September 12, 2005; it failed to chart except in Australia and Switzerland. The music video for the song was directed by Antti J. Jokinen and was filmed "like a movie". It features Elliott responding to a relationship that had gone wrong.

The third single, "We Run This", was released on March 20, 2006, and peaked at number 48 on the Billboard Hot 100 and number 39 on the Billboard Pop 100 and peaked in the top forty in Australia, Ireland and the United Kingdom. An edited version of the song was used as the theme song for the gymnastics-themed film Stick It, as well as for the music video, which was directed by Dave Meyers. The video features a cameo by gold-medalist Dominique Dawes as Elliott's gymnastics coach, with scenes from the film being used throughout the video. The song received a Grammy nomination for Best Rap Solo Performance.

== Critical reception ==
Professional ratings
Aggregate scores
Source	Rating
Metacritic	74/100
Review scores
Source	Rating
AllMusic	4/5 stars
Entertainment Weekly	C−
The Guardian	4/5 stars
Los Angeles Times	2.5/4 stars
NME	8/10
Pitchfork	6.8/10
Q	4/5 stars
Rolling Stone	3/5 stars
Spin	B−
The Village Voice	A−

The Cookbook received positive reviews from most music critics. At Metacritic, which assigns a normalized rating out of 100 to reviews from mainstream critics, the album received an average score of 74, based on 28 reviews, which indicates "generally favorable reviews". Rich Juzwiak of Stylus Magazine gave the album an A rating, stating "Her adventurous and, yes, massive, persona is allowed to wander wherever it wants on The Cookbook, be it avant or common." Alexis Petridis of The Guardian wrote, "The Cookbook is a convincing return to form.... Sounding as unique and startling and formidable as ever, Missy Elliott is clearly not a woman to be messed with." John Bush of AllMusic noted that "Elliott forces a few rhymes, plays to type with her themes, and uses those outside producers to follow trends in hip-hop.... What's different here is how relaxed Elliott is, how willing she seems to simply go with what comes naturally and sounds best." Q stated "If not Elliott's most inventive album, The Cookbook is certainly her most colourful and entertaining".

However, Ben Sisario of Blender wrote, "For every killer raise-your-hands hook there is a snoozer of an SWV-esque torch ballad, and she can't seem to tell the difference." He went on to say, "Almost half the songs are treacly Kleenex soul ballads; even the titles...bring a cringe." Los Angeles Times writer Natalie Nichols found that "her souffle of hip-hop, soul, R&B, funk and dance music falls a bit flat". Rolling Stone's Brian Hiatt called The Cookbook Elliott's "least cohesive, most conventional album yet." Entertainment Weekly's Margeaux Watson viewed that "she's clearly lost without Timbaland", calling him "the main ingredient of her original flavor". Steve Horowitz of PopMatters noted that it "does have a few duds" and found some of the "offensive lyrics" as flaws, but wrote that "While not every cut is a winner, Elliott does a fairly consistent job of gaining the listener's attention through her outrageous lyrics and performance style".

Pitchfork's Ryan Dombal found the album "Even more bipolar than usual", with Elliott "jolting from uber-hypeness to soul-crushing balladry. Fortunately, supported by an array of producers both grizzly and green, her invaluable unpredictability is alternately harnessed and given new life on this album, despite its uneven and transitional nature." Joan Morgan of The Village Voice complimented Elliott's "ability to capture the ain't-afraid-to-sweat flava" and stated "Elliott mines the best of hip-hop's old-school elements for throwback tracks that are engagingly sparse and elemental". In his consumer guide for The Village Voice, critic Robert Christgau gave The Cookbook an A− rating, indicating "the kind of garden-variety good record that is the great luxury of musical micromarketing and overproduction". Christgau called it a "benchmark album" and commented that "Elliott showcases the musical health of African American pop [...] Elliott's disinclination to give it up to gangsta's thrill cult or black pop's soft-focus porn, plus her proven ability to work a good beat when she gets one, leads her naturally to a collection that ebbs and flows, peaks and dips, and pokes fun at any canon of taste you got".

The album was nominated at the 2006 Grammy Awards for Best Rap Album, but lost to Kanye West's Late Registration.

== Commercial performance ==
The Cookbook debuted at number two on the US Billboard 200, selling 176,000 copies in the first week of release. In its second week, the album dropped to number seven on the chart, selling an additional 65,000 copies. On September 15, 2005, the album was certified gold by the Recording Industry Association of America (RIAA) for sales of over 500,000 copies in the United States. On January 22, 2022, the album was certified platinum by the Recording Industry Association of America (RIAA) for sales of over 1,000,000 copies in the United States. As of December 2015, the album has sold 657,000 copies in the US. The Cookbook peaked in the top thirty in Australia, Belgium, Germany, the Netherlands, New Zealand, Norway and Switzerland.

== Track listing ==
The Cookbook track listing
No.	Title	Writer(s)	Producer(s)	Length
1.	"Joy" (featuring Mike Jones)	Melissa Elliott; Jones; Timothy Mosley	Missy Elliott; Timbaland	4:49
2.	"Partytime"	Elliott; Mosley; Seth Justman; James Calloway; Peter Wolf; Stephen Jo Bladd; John Geils; Richard Salwitz; Daniel Klein; Leroy Jackson	Elliott; Timbaland	3:04
3.	"Irresistible Delicious" (featuring Slick Rick)	Elliott; Ricky Walters; Craig Brockman; Eric Sadler; Hank Shocklee	Brockman	4:15
4.	"Lose Control" (featuring Ciara & Fatman Scoop)	Elliott; Juan Atkins; Richard Davis; Isaac Freeman; Ciara Harris; Curtis Hudson	Elliott	3:47
5.	"My Struggles" (featuring Mary J. Blige & Grand Puba)	Elliott; Blige; Al Cleveland; Jones; Maxwell Dixon; Tony Dofat; Leroy Bonner; Andrew Noland; Gregory Webster; Johnny Bristol; Clarence Satchell; Marvin Pierce; Ralph Middlebrooks; William "Smokey" Robinson Jr.; William Jeffrey; Lisa Peters; Qur'an H. Goodman; Norman Napier	Goodman	2:52
6.	"Meltdown"	Elliott; Scott Storch	Storch	4:16
7.	"On & On"	Elliott; Pharrell Williams; Chad Hugo; Ricky Walters; Douglas David	The Neptunes	4:45
8.	"We Run This"	Elliott; Jerry Lordan; Rhemario Webber	Webber	3:25
9.	"Remember When"	Elliott; Brockman; Nisan Stewart	Elliott; Brockman^{[a]}	4:18
10.	"4 My Man" (featuring Fantasia)	Elliott; Bobby Ross Avila; Issiah J. Avila	The Avila Brothers	5:10
11.	"Can't Stop"	Elliott; Rich Harrison	Harrison	3:49
12.	"Teary Eyed"	Elliott; Warryn Campbell	Campbell	3:49
13.	"Mommy"	Elliott; J. Pizzarro; T. Perez; Keith Lewis	Associates; Lewis	2:58
14.	"Click Clack"	Elliott; Shondrae Crawford	Bangladesh; Lewis	2:54
15.	"Time and Time Again"	Elliott; Melvin Coleman	Saint Nick	3:49
16.	"Bad Man" (featuring Vybz Kartel & M.I.A.)	Elliott; Brockman; Adidja Palmer; Demetrius Hubert; Mathangi Arulpragasam	Brockman	5:12
Total length:				63:13

Notes

- ^{^[a]} signifies a co-producer

Sample credits

- "Partytime" contains a sample from "Whammer Jammer" by the J. Geils Band
- "Irresistible Delicious" contains a sample from "Lick the Balls" by Slick Rick
- "Lose Control" contains a sample from "Clear" by Cybotron and "Body Work" by Hot Streak
- "My Struggles" contains a sample from "What's the 411?" by Mary J. Blige
- "We Run This" contains a sample from "Apache" by the Sugarhill Gang

== Personnel ==
- June Ambrose – stylist
- Marcella Araica – assistant engineer
- Chris Brown – assistant engineer
- Jay Brown – A&R
- Greg Gigendad Burke – art direction, design
- Warryn Campbell – producer
- Vadim Chislov – assistant engineer
- Andrew Coleman – engineer
- Wyatt Coleman – engineer
- Shondrae "Mister Bangladesh" Crawford – producer
- Jimmy Douglass – mixing
- Michael Eleopoulos – engineer
- Missy Elliott – producer, executive producer
- Paul J. Falcone – engineer, mixing
- Gloria Elias Foeillet – make-up
- Chris Gehringer – mastering
- Serban Ghenea – mixing
- Hart Gunther – assistant
- Rich Harrison – producer
- Iz – instrumentation
- Eric Jensen – assistant engineer
- Darrale Jones – A&R
- Charlene "Tweet" Keys – background vocals
- Keith Lewis – producer
- Patrick Magee – assistant engineer
- Kimberly Mason – coordination
- The Neptunes – producer
- Saint Nick – producer
- Larry Sims – coordination
- Southwest DeKalb – drums
- Scott Storch – producer
- Conrad "Con da Don" Golding – engineer
- Aaron "Franchise" Fishbein – guitar
- Timbaland – producer
- Saint Warwick – photography
- Rhemario Webber – producer
- Rayshawn Woolard – assistant engineer

== Charts ==
=== Weekly charts ===
Chart (2005)	Peak position
Australian Albums (ARIA)	19
Australian Urban Albums (ARIA)	4
Austrian Albums (Ö3 Austria)	34
Belgian Albums (Ultratop Flanders)	20
Belgian Albums (Ultratop Wallonia)	22
Canadian Albums (Nielsen SoundScan)	18
Dutch Albums (Album Top 100)	21
European Top 100 Albums (Billboard)	26
French Albums (SNEP)	54
German Albums (Offizielle Top 100)	19
Irish Albums (IRMA)	47
Italian Albums (FIMI)	62
Japanese Albums (Oricon)	16
New Zealand Albums (RMNZ)	20
Norwegian Albums (VG-lista)	23
Scottish Albums (Official Charts)	54
Swedish Albums (Sverigetopplistan)	41
Swiss Albums (Schweizer Hitparade)	8
Taiwanese Albums (Five Music)	5
UK Albums (Official Charts)	33
UK R&B Albums (Official Charts)	7
US Billboard 200	2
US Top R&B/Hip-Hop Albums (Billboard)	1
US Top Rap Albums (Billboard)	1

=== Year-end charts ===
Chart (2005)	Position
US Billboard 200	120
US Top R&B/Hip-Hop Albums (Billboard)	44

== Certifications ==
Region	Certification	Certified units/sales
New Zealand (RMNZ)	Gold	7,500^{‡}
United States (RIAA)	Platinum	1,000,000^{‡}
^{‡} Sales+streaming figures based on certification alone.

== Release history ==
List of release dates, showing region, formats, and label
Region	Date	Format(s)	Label
Germany	July 4, 2005	CD; digital download	Atlantic; Goldmind
United Kingdom	July 4, 2005	CD; digital download	Atlantic; Goldmind
France	July 5, 2005	CD; digital download	Atlantic; Goldmind
Japan	July 5, 2005	CD; digital download	Atlantic; Goldmind
United States	July 5, 2005	CD; digital download	Atlantic; Goldmind
