= Take the Lead =

- Theatrical release poster
- Directed by: Liz Friedlander
- Written by: Dianne Houston
- Produced by: Christopher Godsick; Michelle Grace; Diane Nabatoff
- Starring: Antonio Banderas; Rob Brown; Alfre Woodard
- Cinematography: Alex Nepomniaschy
- Edited by: Robert Ivison
- Music by: Aaron Zigman; Swizz Beatz
- Production company: Tiara Blu Films
- Distributed by: New Line Cinema
- Release date: April 7, 2006
- Running time: 118 minutes
- Country: United States
- Language: English
- Budget: $30 million
- Box office: $66.2 million

Take the Lead is a 2006 American drama dance film directed by Liz Friedlander in her feature directional debut and starring Antonio Banderas as dance instructor Pierre Dulaine, the founder of Dancing Classrooms. It also stars Alfre Woodard, John Ortiz, Rob Brown, Yaya DaCosta, Dante Basco, Elijah Kelley, and Jenna Dewan. The film was released on April 7, 2006. Although based in New York City, it was filmed in Toronto. Stock footage of various locations in New York City was used.

== Plot ==
A group of students are preparing for a school dance. Rock arrives with a damaged ticket and is denied entry by Mr. Temple and Principal James. After leaving, Rock is provoked by a group of thugs to vandalize the Principal's car. When Pierre Dulaine comes on the scene, they all run off.

The next morning, Pierre arrives at the school to see the Principal. After explaining that he witnessed her car being vandalized, Pierre offers to take over the detention shift and teach them ballroom dancing. She agrees, although she feels sure that he will not last more than a day. His first class goes badly due to the scepticism and uncooperative personalities of the students. When Pierre returns the next morning, Principal James explains that the reason LaRhette had refused to dance with Rock the day before was because Rock's brother was involved in a gang war, in which one of the casualties was LaRhette's brother.

At Pierre's dance studio, Caitlin is under pressure to learn to dance because her cotillion is approaching. She feels a failure and envies Morgan for her graceful sensuality, remarking to Pierre that she is "like sex on hardwood." This gives Pierre an idea of how to reach out to the kids in detention. He invites Morgan to give them a demonstration of the tango, which inspires the students to be more willing to learn. Caitlin decides to join them for dance class and practices with Monster. Though the other students suspect her of wanting to "tell her upper class friends that she's slumming" at first, they learn to accept her when she admits that she feels better with them.

LaRhette, the daughter of a prostitute, cares for her younger siblings while her mother works the streets. One night, she runs out of the apartment and to the school after one of her mother's clients attempts to rape her. While practicing her dancing, she runs into Rock, who'd gone down there to sleep after losing his job and getting kicked out of his house after a physical confrontation with his drunken father over the death of Rock's brother. They fight and are caught by security. Principal James wants to suspend them both, but agrees to give them extra detention with Pierre instead.

Pierre tells the class about a dance competition that he wants them to enter. Gradually, the students begin to trust Pierre; Kurd even visits his apartment to discuss his sexual problems. When the detention basement is flooded, Pierre takes the students to his dance studio to practice. The youngsters become disheartened by the skills of Pierre's students there as well as the $200 entrance fee for the contest. However, Pierre manages to inspire them again and promises to pay the fee. LaRhette and Rock, who have now learned to respect each other, are assigned to compete in the waltz, and rivals Ramos and Danjou learn to share Sasha during practice.

Mr. Temple complains about the school's resources being wasted on the dance program. When Pierre is brought to a meeting with the parents' association, he convinces them to keep the program going after demonstrating how ballroom dancing has taught the students "teamwork, respect, and dignity". On the night of the contest, Rock is told by the gang he has joined that he must participate in a theft. He intentionally shoots the sprinkler system, setting off the alarm, and all have to flee.

At the competition, it is announced that a $5000 prize will be given to the winning team. Monster intervenes in the cotillion and saves Caitlin from tripping. Sasha, Danjou, and Ramos perform an impressive three-person tango but are disqualified because the event is a partner dance. Morgan is awarded the prize but defuses the tension by calling it a tie and giving Sasha her trophy. Principal James is impressed with the success of the program and tells Pierre she is making it permanent. Rock arrives at the last minute to dance the waltz with LaRhette, whom he kisses at the end. The final credits roll as Pierre's students triumphantly dance to hip hop music, having taken over the sound system.

Closing exposition

Since "Dancing Classrooms" was created by Pierre Dulaine, it has grown to involve 42 instructors and more than 12,000 students in 120 New York City public schools. It is currently expanding across America.

== Cast ==
- Antonio Banderas as Pierre Dulaine, a ballroom dance instructor
- Alfre Woodard as Principal Augustine James
- John Ortiz as Mr. Joseph Temple, a teacher who only cares for academic success.

Students

- Rob Brown as Jason 'Rock' Rockwell
- Yaya DaCosta as LaRhette Dudley
- Dante Basco as Ramos
- Laura Benanti as Tina
- Marcus T. Paulk as Eddie, a talented DJ
- Jenna Dewan as Sasha Bulut, who is caught in a love triangle with Danjou and Ramos.
- Elijah Kelley as Danjou
- Jasika Nicole as Egypt
- Brandon D. Andrews as 'Monster', an overweight pupil
- Lauren Collins as Caitlin
- Katya Virshilas as Morgan
- Jonathan Malen as Kurd
- Shawand McKenzie as Big Girl, Monster's cousin
- Joseph Pierre as Trey

The film also stars Alison Sealy-Smith and Phillip Jarrett as Rock's parents; Jo Chim as Gretchen; Kevin Hanchard as Woodley; Joseph Pierre as Trey; Lyriq Bent as Easy; and Sharron Matthews as Ms. Rosemead.

== Production ==
=== Casting ===
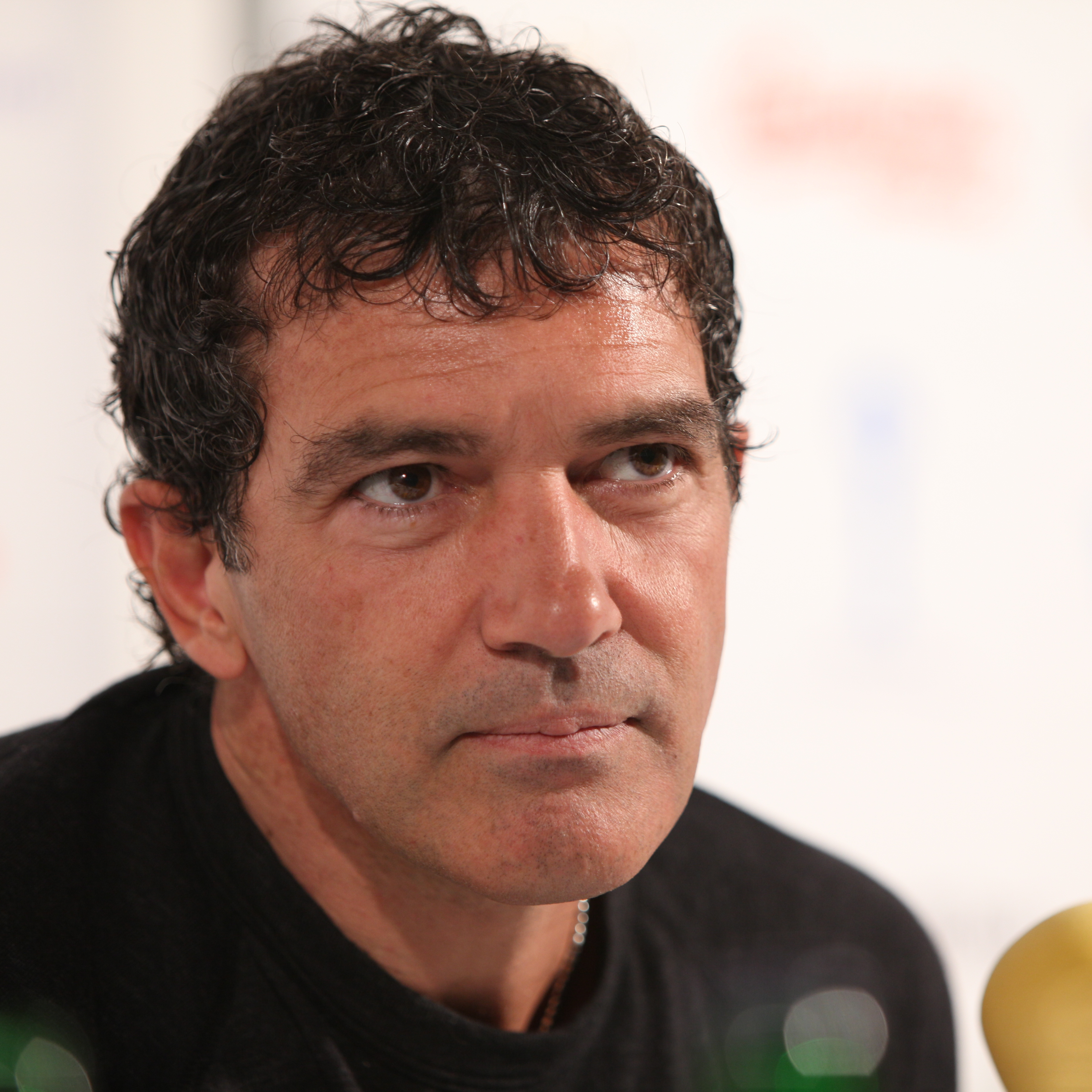
Banderas had no interest in doing the film at first. He wasn't even bothered to read the script.

Banderas initially turned the producers down; not even bothering to read the script. The thought of ballroom dancing sounded "so cheesy", and he felt the film didn't have much of a story. He said to his agent: "nah, I don't want to do this", but after much persuasion, he agreed to meet with the producers; giving them a chance to at least "explain what" they were "trying to do". Once they showed Banderas a documentary on Pierre Dulaine, he said he "loved" it. He found Dulaine to be "very" fascinating.

Many of the "kids" had little or no acting experience prior to being cast in Take the Lead. Brandon Andrews, who portrayed Monster, had just "graduated [from high school] and had "never auditioned [for a film] before". At the time of his discovery, he was playing on the "football team at Dominguez High School in Compton, California". Likewise, the film marked the feature film debut of Yaya DaCosta. Her only acting experience before the film had been starring in an episode of Eve. Lauren Collins was cast under similar circumstances; like DaCosta, Take the Lead was her first feature film. Although she had the advantage of having worked on various TV shows and television movies since 1998, she found the "entire process" of making a feature film different to working on television. On the other hand, Rob Brown was already a fairly established actor. He was studying at college when cast as Jason "Rock" Rockwell, and graduated after the film's release.

== Release ==
Take the Lead premiered on March 17, 2006 at the RiverRun International Film Festival in Winston-Salem, North Carolina. It was released in Israel on April 6, 2006, followed by the United States and Canada on April 7. Theatrical releases continued to occur around the world until July 14, 2007.

=== Critical reception ===
Metacritic reports a score of 55 out of 100 (based on 30 critics), indicating a "mixed or average" reviews. Rotten Tomatoes reports a similar score; 44 percent of critics gave the film a positive review (based on 119 reviews - 52 "fresh" and 67 "rotten"), with an average rating of 5.4 out of 10. The site's consensus states: "Banderas is charismatic in the lead, and the dance sequences are captivating, but the story is too familiar and predictable." Audiences polled by CinemaScore gave the film an average grade of "A−" on an A+ to F scale.

Roger Ebert, of the Chicago Sun-Times, awarded three out of four stars. Having seen the "charming" documentary Mad Hot Ballroom, he anticipated the "general direction" the film would take. While the film wasn't "particularly original" and lacked the impact of earlier "classroom parables"; Stand and Deliver and Lean on Me, Antonio Banderas was "reason enough" to see the film. From Ebert's perspective, the film was "more fable than record", and "more wishful thinking than a plan of action".

=== Box office performance ===
The film earned $4.2 million on its opening day, debuting third place at the domestic box office. It grossed a further $4.9 million on the second day, and another $3 million on the third. In its opening weekend, Take the Lead grossed a total of $12.1 million at the domestic box office. The film's performance proceeded to fluctuate; depending on the day, gross takings could increase by as much as 110 percent and vice versa. The film ultimately grossed a total of $34.7 million at the U.S. box office, and $31 million at the international box office, bringing the worldwide gross to $66 million.

Release date(s)	Production budget	Box office revenue		
Release date(s)	Production budget	United States	Other markets	Worldwide
April 6, 2006 (Israel); April 7, 2006 (United States/Canada); April 13, 2006 to July 14, 2007(Multiple countries)	$30,000,000	$34,742,066	$31,000,463	$65,742,529

=== Home video ===
On August 29, 2006, Take the Lead was released on DVD by New Line Home Entertainment. As of September 22, 2015, the film has grossed $21.2 million in domestic home video sales.

== Soundtrack ==
Take the Lead (Original Motion Picture Soundtrack)

Soundtrack album by various artists
- Released: March 28, 2006
- Recorded: 2005–2006
- Genres: Hip hop, R&B, dance
- Length: 44:21
- Labels: Republic; Universal
- Producers: apl.de.ap; Cool & Dre; Grant McSleazy; Mark Ronson; Neff-U; Swizz Beatz; Timbaland

Singles from Take the Lead (Original Motion Picture Soundtrack)
- 1. "Take the Lead (Wanna Ride)" Released: March 21, 2006

The official single: "Take The Lead (Wanna Ride)", a collaboration between American hip hop group Bone Thugs-n-Harmony and Puerto Rican duo Wisin & Yandel, featuring rapper Fatman Scoop and singer Melissa Jiménez, was released on March 21, 2006.

=== Track listing ===
No.	Title	Writer(s)	Producer(s)	Length
1.	"I Got Rhythm (Take the Lead Remix)" (performed by Lena Horne, Marty Paich and Q-Tip)	George Gershwin; Ira Gershwin	Dick Peirce; Swizz Beatz^{[r]}; Aaron Zigman^{[r]}	2:17
2.	"Take the Lead (Wanna Ride)" (performed by Bone Thugs-n-Harmony, Wisin & Yandel, Fatman Scoop and Melissa Jiménez)	S. Howse; Anthony Henderson; Charles Scruggs; Llandel Veguilla; Juan Morera; Isaac Freeman III; Melissa Jiménez; Kasseem Dean	Swizz Beatz	3:28
3.	"Feel It" (performed by Black Eyed Peas)	Allan Pineda; Stacy Ferguson	apl.de.ap; Printz Board^{[c]}; will.i.am^{[c]}	4:21
4.	"I Like That (Stop)" (performed by Jae Millz)	Jae Millz; Andre Lyons; Marcello Valenzano	Cool & Dre	3:45
5.	"These Days" (performed by Rhymefest)	Che Smith; Mark Ronson; Shelton Brooks	Mark Ronson	3:40
6.	"Here We Go" (performed by Dirtbag)	Jermany James; Timothy Mosley	Timbaland	3:42
7.	"Whuteva" (performed by Remy Ma)	Reminisce Smith; Dean; David Shire	Swizz Beatz	3:47
8.	"Ya Ya (Al Stone Mix)" (performed by the Empty Heads)	J. Anderson; S. Finch; M. Atteen; E. Morena; D. German; R. Datar; M. Choi		3:07
9.	"Never Gonna Get It" (performed by Sean Biggs, Topic and Akon)	Sean Biggs; D. Holman; Aliaune Thiam; Theron Feemster	Ron "Neff-U" Feemster	3:37
10.	"I Like That You Can't Take That Away From Me" (performed by Jae Millz, June Christy, Eric B. & Rakim and Mashonda)	G. Gershwin; I. Gershwin; Millz; Lyons; Valenzano; William Griffin; Eric Barrier; Bob James; T. Jackson; C. Forte; K. Kandekore; Dean; Mashonda Tifrere; Mel Smalls	Grant McSleazy	2:29
11.	"Fascination" (performed by Kem)	Dick Manning; Dante Marchetti	Carlos Gunn^{[c]}	4:49
12.	"Qué Será, Será (Whatever Will Be, Will Be) (Bonus Track)" (performed by Sly and the Family Stone)	J. Livingston; R. Evans	Sly Stone	5:19
Total length:				44:21

=== Stage musical adaptation ===
The film was adapted into a stage musical that opened at the Paper Mill Playhouse in April 2025.

Notes

- ^{^[c]} signifies a co-producer
- ^{^[r]} signifies a remixer
