= Enter (Cybotron album) =

Studio album by Cybotron
- Released: 1983
- Genre: Electro, techno
- Length: 39:23
- Label: Fantasy
- Producer: Juan Atkins, Richard Davis

Cybotron chronology
Enter (1983)	Empathy (1993)

Singles from Enter
- 1. "Alleys of Your Mind / Cosmic Raindance" Released: 1981; 2. "Cosmic Cars / The Line" Released: 1982; 3. "Clear / Industrial Lies" Released: 1983

Enter is the debut studio album by American techno group Cybotron, released in 1983. In 1990, it was reissued under the new title Clear. In 2013, it was reissued under the original title, Enter, with additional bonus tracks.

== Critical reception ==
Professional ratings
Review scores
Source	Rating
AllMusic	5/5 stars
Metro Times	favorable
Pitchfork	8.7/10
Tom Hull – on the Web	B+

John Bush of AllMusic said: "The collision of [Juan] Atkins' vision for cosmic funk and the arena rock instincts of Rick Davis results in a surprisingly cohesive album, dated for all the right reasons and quite pop-minded." Lee DeVito of Metro Times said, "Enter aims to do a lot of things here, but, thanks to driving drum machine beats, dancing and escapism almost always top the agenda." According to Miles Raymer of Pitchfork, who gave the album an 8.7 out of 10, the album is "widely considered to be where Detroit techno began".

== Track listing ==
Enter (1983 original edition)
No.	Title	Length
1.	"Enter"	5:37
2.	"Alleys of Your Mind"	3:34
3.	"Industrial Lies"	6:14
4.	"The Line"	5:01
5.	"Cosmic Cars"	4:21
6.	"Cosmic Raindance"	4:00
7.	"El Salvador"	5:49
8.	"Clear"	4:47

Clear (1990 reissue edition)
No.	Title	Length
1.	"Clear"	4:52
2.	"R-9"	5:14
3.	"Cosmic Cars"	4:25
4.	"Enter"	5:37
5.	"Alleys of Your Mind"	3:31
6.	"Industrial Lies"	6:14
7.	"The Line"	5:01
8.	"Cosmic Raindance"	4:00
9.	"El Salvador"	4:47

Enter (2013 reissue edition) bonus tracks
No.	Title	Length
9.	"Clear (Jose Animal Diaz Remix)"	4:51
10.	"Cosmic Cars (Detroit Style Mix)"	4:27
11.	"Techno City (Vocal)"	4:21
12.	"Techno City (Instrumental)"	6:39
13.	"R-9 (Instrumental)"	4:44
14.	"Eden (Vocal)"	5:52

== Personnel ==
Credits adapted from liner notes.

- Juan Atkins – electronics, vocals, production
- Richard "3070" Davis – electronics, vocals, production
- John "Jon-5" Housely – guitar
