= Grand Hotel (musical) =

Musical by Robert Wright, George Forrest, and Maury Yeston

- Original Broadway logo
- Music: Robert Wright; George Forrest; Maury Yeston
- Lyrics: Robert Wright; George Forrest; Maury Yeston
- Book: Luther Davis
- Basis: 1929 Vicki Baum novel and play, Menschen im Hotel (People in a Hotel) and film
- Productions: 1989 Broadway; 1992 West End; 2005 West End Revival

Grand Hotel is a musical in two acts with a book by Luther Davis, music and lyrics by Robert Wright and George Forrest, and additional music and lyrics by Maury Yeston.

The musical is based on Vicki Baum's 1929 novel, its eponymous spin-off play Menschen im Hotel (People in a Hotel), and the subsequent 1932 MGM feature film. It focuses on events taking place over the course of a weekend in an elegant hotel in 1928 Berlin and the intersecting stories of the eccentric guests of the hotel, including a fading prima ballerina, a fatally ill Jewish bookkeeper who wants to spend his final days living in luxury, a young and handsome but destitute Baron, a cynical doctor, an honest businessman gone bad, and a typist dreaming of Hollywood success.

The show's 1989 Broadway production garnered 12 Tony Award nominations and won five, including best direction and choreography for Tommy Tune. Big-name cast replacements, including Cyd Charisse and Zina Bethune, helped the show become the first American musical since 1985's Big River to top 1,000 performances on Broadway.

== Background ==
Menschen im Hotel marked the beginning of the career of popular Austrian novelist Baum in 1929, and she dramatized her novel for the Berlin stage later in the same year. After the play became a hit, its English-language adaptation enjoyed success in New York in the early 1930s and was made into the blockbuster 1932 Academy Award-winning film, Grand Hotel, starring Greta Garbo, John Barrymore and Joan Crawford.

=== At the Grand ===
Davis, Wright, and Forrest first adapted Baum's story in 1958 under the title At the Grand, changing the setting from 1928 Berlin to contemporary Rome and transforming the ballerina into an opera singer closely resembling Maria Callas to accommodate Joan Diener, who was scheduled to star under the direction of her husband Albert Marre. All of them had collaborated on the earlier musical Kismet and anticipated another success, but Davis' book strayed too far from the story familiar to fans of the film. When Paul Muni agreed to portray Kringelein, the role was changed and expanded, with the character becoming a lowly hotel employee whose stay in a hotel suite is kept secret from the management. Flaemmchen became a dancing soubrette, Preysing and his dramatic storyline were eliminated, and two deported American gangsters were added for comic relief.

At the Grand opened to mixed reviews and good business in Los Angeles and San Francisco, but when it became apparent to the creators that Muni was ill and would not be able to sustain a Broadway run, producer Edwin Lester decided to cancel the Broadway opening scheduled for September 25, 1958, and everyone moved on to other projects.

=== Grand Hotel ===
Three decades later, Davis, Wright, and Forrest decided to dust off their original material and give the show another try, returning it to its original 1928 Berlin setting. This time, it was placed in the hands of director-choreographer Tommy Tune, who envisioned it as a two-hour, non-stop production comprising dialogue scenes, musical numbers, and dance routines overlapping and at times competing with each other, thereby capturing the mood of a bustling hotel where something is happening at all times. Seven songs from At the Grand were incorporated into what was now called Grand Hotel, although two were dropped during the Boston tryout.

During the Boston run in 1989, Wright and Forrest acquiesced when Tune requested Maury Yeston, with whom he had worked in Nine, be brought in to contribute fresh material. Yeston wrote seven new songs in the first week, including "Love Can't Happen", "I Want to Go to Hollywood", "At The Grand Hotel", "Bonjour Amour", "Roses at the Station" and "Grand Parade" (the new opening number), as well as additional lyrics for some of the Wright and Forrest songs. At Tune's request, Peter Stone came in as uncredited play doctor, though the book remained entirely the work of Davis. Yeston received billing for Additional Music and Lyrics and was nominated for two Drama Desk Awards for his work. Ballroom choreography was by Pierre Dulaine and Yvonne Marceau, who played The Gigolo and The Countess in the show, and as a favor to Tune, Thommie Walsh choreographed a brief dance section in "I Want to Go to Hollywood".

== Synopsis ==
The roaring '20s are still in high gear, and Berlin is the center of high life. Guests come and go at the opulent Grand Hotel, as cynical Doctor Otternschlag, who still suffers from World War I wounds, injects his morphine. Assistant concierge Erik, busy at the front desk, waits to hear of his son's birth; his wife is having a difficult labor. Baron Felix Von Gaigern, young, good-looking, and destitute, uses his charisma to help him secure a room in the overbooked hotel while stiffing a tough gangster who pretends to be a chauffeur. Aging Russian prima ballerina Elizaveta Grushinskaya arrives with her entourage, who tries to persuade her that she still can and must dance. Her confidante and dresser, Raffaela, knows that they would have to come up with a lot of money if the dancer failed to show up for her contracted engagements. Raffaela has feelings for Elizaveta.

Jewish bookkeeper Otto Kringelein, who is fatally ill, wants to spend his life's savings to live his final days at the hotel in the lap of luxury. The Baron helps him secure a room. Meanwhile, Hermann Preysing, the general manager of a failing textile mill, hears that the merger with a Boston company has been called off, spelling financial ruin; he does not want to lie to his stockholders but gives in to the pressure. He plans to go to Boston to try to revive the merger and presses his temporary secretary, Flaemmchen, to accompany him and "take care of him". She dreams of Hollywood stardom and fears she might be pregnant, but flirts with the Baron. She also agrees to a dance, at the Baron's suggestion, with the surprised and delighted Otto. Elizaveta suffers through another unsuccessful dance performance and rushes back to the hotel. She bursts into her room to find the Baron as he is about to steal her diamond necklace to pay back the gangster, but he pretends to be her biggest fan. The two fall in love and spend the night together. He agrees to go with her to Vienna so she can fulfill her dancing engagements, and they plan to marry; they will meet at the train station.

Two African-American entertainers, the Jimmys, sing at the bar and dance with Flaemmchen. Erik tries to get out of work so that he can join his wife at the hospital, but the unpleasant hotel manager, Rohna, refuses to give him any time off. The Baron has persuaded Otto to invest in the stock market, and Otto has made a killing in the market overnight. But Otto is not feeling well, and the Baron helps him to his room, resisting the temptation to steal his wallet. Otto rewards the Baron with some cash. The gangster confronts the Baron and directs him to steal Preysing's wallet; he gives the Baron a gun. Preysing has cornered Flaemmchen in their adjoining rooms and pressures her for sex. The Baron, who was in Preysing's room trying to steal his wallet, hears Flaemmchen's cries next door and walks into her room to defend her while still holding Preysing's wallet. After a struggle, Preysing kills the Baron with the gangster's gun. Preysing is arrested. Raffaela struggles with how to tell Grushinskaya that her lover is dead and ultimately decides not to, leaving Grushinskaya ecstatic to see him at the train station when she leaves.

Otto offers to take Flaemmchen to Paris; he has plenty of money now, so they can enjoy the good life for as long as he has left, and she realizes she is fond of him. Erik has a son and learns that his wife gave birth just fine. Doctor Otternschlag observes: "Grand Hotel, Berlin. Always the same – people come, people go – One life ends while another begins – one heart breaks while another beats faster – one man goes to jail while another goes to Paris – always the same. ... I'll stay – one more day."

== Cast ==
Character	Broadway (1989)	U.S. National Tour (1990)	West End (1992)	West End (2004)
Baron Felix Von Gaigern	David Carroll	Brent Barrett	Brent Barrett	Julian Ovenden
Otto Kringelein	Michael Jeter	Mark Baker	Barry James	Daniel Evans
Elizaveta Grushinskaya	Liliane Montevecchi	Liliane Montevecchi	Liliane Montevecchi	Mary Elizabeth Mastrantonio
Flaemmchen	Jane Krakowski	DeLee Lively	Lynnette Perry	Helen Baker
General Director Preysing	Timothy Jerome	K.C. Wilson	K.C. Wilson	Martyn Ellis
Raffaela Ottanio	Karen Akers	Debbie de Courdreaux	Debbie de Courdreaux	Gillian Bevan
Colonel Doctor Otternschlag	John Wylie	Anthony Franciosa	Barry Foster	Gary Raymond
Erik Litnauer	Bob Stillman	Dirk Lumbard	Kieran McIlroy	David Lucas
The Two Jimmys	David Jackson; Danny Strayhorn	Nathan Gibson; David Andrew White	David Jackson; David Andrew White	Joseph Nobel; Paul Hazel

=== Notable replacements ===
Broadway: (1989–92)

- Baron Felix Von Gaigern: Brent Barrett, Mark Jacoby, John Schneider, Rex Smith, Walter Willison
- Otto Kringelein: Austin Pendleton, Chip Zien
- Elizaveta Grushinskaya: Zina Bethune, Cyd Charisse
- Raffaela Ottanio: Julie Caitlin Brown
- Colonel Doctor Otternschlag: Edmund Lyndeck

== Song list ==
- "The Grand Parade"^{Y} – Colonel-Doctor Otternschlag, Company
- "Some Have, Some Have Not"^{WF} – Scullery Workers, Bellboys
- "As It Should Be"^{WF} – Baron Felix von Gaigern
- "At the Grand Hotel"^{Y}/"Table With a View"^{WF} – Otto Kringelein
- "Maybe My Baby Loves Me"^{WF} – Two Jimmys, Flaemmchen
- "Fire and Ice"^{WF} – Elizaveta Grushinskaya, Company
- "Twenty-Two Years"^{Y}/"Villa on a Hill"^{WF} – Raffaela
- "I Want to Go to Hollywood"^{Y} – Flaemmchen
- "Everybody's Doing It"^{Y} – Zinnowitz
- "As It Should Be" (Reprise) – Baron Felix
- "The Crooked Path"^{WF} – Hermann Preysing
- "Who Couldn't Dance With You?"^{WF} – Flaemmchen, Otto
- "Merger Is On"^{WF} – Zinnowitz, Shareholders
- "Gru's Bedroom"^{WF} – Elizaveta, Company
- "Love Can't Happen"^{Y} – Baron Felix, Elizaveta
- "What You Need"^{WF} – Raffaela
- "Bonjour Amour"^{Y} – Elizaveta
- "H-A-P-P-Y"^{WF} – Two Jimmys, Company
- "We'll Take a Glass Together"^{WF} – Baron Felix, Otto, Company
- "I Waltz Alone"^{WF} – Colonel-Doctor Otternschlag
- "H-A-P-P-Y" (Reprise) – Company
- "Roses at the Station"^{Y} – Baron Felix
- "How Can I Tell Her?"^{WF} – Raffaela
- "The Grand Parade"/"Some Have, Some Have Not" (Reprise) – Erik, Operators, Company
- "The Grand Waltz"^{WF} – Company

^WF Song by Robert Wright and George Forrest
^Y Song by Maury Yeston

== Productions ==
After thirty-one previews, Grand Hotel opened on November 12, 1989, at the Martin Beck Theatre (now the Al Hirschfeld Theatre), and later transferred to the George Gershwin Theatre to complete its total run of 1,017 performances. The show is played without an intermission. The original cast included Liliane Montevecchi as Elizaveta, David Carroll as the Baron, Michael Jeter as Otto, Jane Krakowski as Flaemmchen, Tim Jerome as Preysing, John Wylie as Otternschlag, and Bob Stillman as Erik. Replacements later in the run included Zina Bethune and Cyd Charisse (in her Broadway debut at age 70) as Elizaveta, Rex Smith, Brent Barrett, John Schneider, and Walter Willison as the Baron, and Chip Zien and Austin Pendleton as Kringelein. The production earned 12 Tony Award nominations and won five awards, including best direction and choreography for Tommy Tune. The original cast recording was released nearly two years after the show premiered. By the time the recording was made, Carroll was seriously ill with AIDS and died from a pulmonary embolism in the recording studio as he was about to record his vocal tracks. Brent Barrett, his understudy, who had appeared as the Baron in the national tour, sang the role for the cast album, released by RCA Victor. The cast album features a bonus track of Carroll's performance during a 1991 cabaret fundraiser for Equity Fights AIDS, singing the Baron's song, "Love Can't Happen".

The production was staged by the same team in Berlin, Germany, in 1991, in German at Theater des Westens, with Leslie Caron as Grushinskaya.

The first West End production opened on July 6, 1992, at the Dominion Theatre, where it ran for slightly less than four months. In 2004, Mary Elizabeth Mastrantonio starred as Elizaveta in a small-scale production directed by Michael Grandage at the Donmar Warehouse, garnering an Olivier Award for Best Musical Revival. A further production opened on July 31, 2015, at London's Southwark Playhouse, running for five weeks.

Grand Hotel: The 25th Anniversary Reunion Concert at the nightclub 54 Below in New York City on May 24, 2015, was written and directed by Walter Willison. Willison starred alongside fellow Broadway cast members Montevecchi, Barrett, Jerome, as well as Karen Akers, Ben George, Ken Jennings, Hal Robinson and Chip Zien. The dance consultant was Yvonne Marceau. The show was produced by Encores!, directed by Josh Rhodes, in New York City from March 21–25, 2018. Grand Hotel: A 30th Anniversary Celebration in Concert at the nightclub The Yellow Pavilion (aka The Green Fig), presented by The Green Room 42, in New York City on November 11, 2019, was again written and directed by Willison, as a benefit for the Actors Fund of America, and dedicated to Montevecchi. Willison starred alongside Akers, Jerome, Jennings, Schneider, Jill Powell, Judy Kaye and Sachi Parker. The associate director and choreographer (in the style of Tommy Tune) was Joanna Rush, and the dance consultant was again Marceau.

== Awards and nominations ==
=== Original Broadway production ===
Year	Award	Category	Nominee	Result
1990	Tony Award	Best Musical		Nominated
1990	Tony Award	Best Book of a Musical	Luther Davis	Nominated
1990	Tony Award	Best Original Score	Robert Wright, George Forrest and Maury Yeston	Nominated
1990	Tony Award	Best Performance by a Leading Actor in a Musical	David Carroll	Nominated
1990	Tony Award	Best Performance by a Leading Actress in a Musical	Liliane Montevecchi	Nominated
1990	Tony Award	Best Performance by a Featured Actor in a Musical	Michael Jeter	Won
1990	Tony Award	Best Performance by a Featured Actress in a Musical	Jane Krakowski	Nominated
1990	Tony Award	Best Direction of a Musical	Tommy Tune	Won
1990	Tony Award	Best Choreography	Tommy Tune	Won
1990	Tony Award	Best Scenic Design	Tony Walton	Nominated
1990	Tony Award	Best Costume Design	Santo Loquasto	Won
1990	Tony Award	Best Lighting Design	Jules Fisher	Won
1990	Drama Desk Award	Outstanding Musical		Nominated
1990	Drama Desk Award	Outstanding Actor in a Musical	David Carroll	Nominated
1990	Drama Desk Award	Outstanding Featured Actor in a Musical	Michael Jeter	Won
1990	Drama Desk Award	Outstanding Featured Actress in a Musical	Jane Krakowski	Nominated
1990	Drama Desk Award	Outstanding Director of a Musical	Tommy Tune	Won
1990	Drama Desk Award	Outstanding Choreography	Tommy Tune	Won
1990	Drama Desk Award	Outstanding Orchestrations	Peter Matz	Nominated
1990	Drama Desk Award	Outstanding Lyrics	Robert Wright, George Forrest and Maury Yeston	Nominated
1990	Drama Desk Award	Outstanding Music	Robert Wright, George Forrest and Maury Yeston	Nominated
1990	Drama Desk Award	Outstanding Set Design	Tony Walton	Nominated
1990	Drama Desk Award	Outstanding Costume Design	Santo Loquasto	Won
1990	Drama Desk Award	Outstanding Lighting Design	Jules Fisher	Won

=== Original London production ===
Year	Award	Category	Nominee	Result
1993	Laurence Olivier Award	Best New Musical		Nominated
1993	Laurence Olivier Award	Best Theatre Choreographer	Tommy Tune	Nominated

=== London revival ===
Year	Award	Category	Nominee	Result
2005	Laurence Olivier Award	Best Musical Revival	Won	
