= We Run This =

2006 single by Missy Elliott

Single by Missy Elliott

from the album The Cookbook , Respect M.E. and Stick It soundtrack
- Released: March 20, 2006
- Length: 3:25
- Label: Goldmind; Atlantic
- Songwriters: Melissa Elliott; Rhemario Webber; Jerry Lordan
- Producer: Rhemario "Rio Beats" Webber

Missy Elliott singles chronology
"Teary Eyed" (2005)	"We Run This" (2006)	"Touch It" (remix) (2006)

Music video
- "We Run This" on YouTube

"We Run This" is a song by American recording artist Missy Elliott. It was written by Elliott and Rhemario "Rio Beats" Webber for her sixth studio album, The Cookbook (2005), while production was handled by the latter. An uptempo throwback song that is built upon a marching-band solo, "We Run This" samples animated percussions from American hip hop group The Sugarhill Gang's version of The Shadows' 1960 song "Apache." Due to the sample, Jerry Lordan is also credited as a songwriter.

The song was released as both the third single from The Cookbook in the United States and the lead single from Elliott's first compilation album Respect M.E. (2006). While it failed to reprise the success of lead single "Lose Control" (2005), it reached the top 30 in Australia and Ireland and peaked at number 48 on the US Billboard Hot 100. Issued to favorable reviews, "We Run This" earned a Best Rap Solo Performance nomination at the 49th Annual Grammy Awards, while it music video, directed by Dave Meyers, won in the Best Visual Effects category at the 2006 MTV Video Music Awards.

== Background ==
"We Run This" was written by Elliott along with its producer Rhemario "Rio Beats" Webber. The song samples elements from the 1981 song "Apache" by The Sugarhill Gang, itself being a cover version of The Shadows' 1960 original.

== Critical reception ==
"We Run This" earned generally positive reviews from music critics and was nominated for Best Rap Solo Performance at the 49th Annual Grammy Awards. Brian Sims from HipHopDX fiund that "Missy rocks the party on "We Run This," a fun throwback party track featuring the classic party beat to "Jam On It." IGN editor Spence D. noted that Elliott "bounces back on "We Run This." However, with the almost comedic intro [...] the old school "Apache" beat is a nice throwback touch and Missy rocks it brilliantly, proving that she's not just a brilliant mimic, but a powerful queen of the throw down in her own right."

AllMusic's John Bush wrote that "resurrects the "Apache" break and a classic Sugarhill Gang track for one of the best club tunes of the year." In her review of parent album The Cookbook, Linda McGee, writing for RTÉ.ie, felt that the song "was another of the especially catchy tracks on his album, with Missy's raps complimented to perfection by some slick musical arrangement." Killy Empire from The Guardian found that the song served as a compensation for "the loss of Timbaland" on The Cookbook, stating: "Rhemario Webber's "We Run This" rains soul, orchestras and "Apache" samples on top of an undaunted Missy."

== Commercial performance ==
"We Run This" was released as the third and final single from Elliott's sixth studio album The Cookbook (2005) as well as the lead single from her Respect M.E. (2006). It also served as the theme song for the American teen comedy-drama film Stick It (2006). In the United States, the song peaked at number 48 on the US Billboard Hot 100. Elsewhere, it was released to bigger commercial success than Elliott's previous single "Teary Eyed" (2005), reaching the top 30 in both Australia and Ireland.

== Music video ==
With an edited version of "We Run This" being used as the theme song for the film Stick It (2006) and Elliott co-scoring the Disney/Touchstone Pictures production, the music video for "We Run This" features clips from the film. The visuals were shot with longtime collaborator Dave Meyers on January 3–4, 2006 in Los Angeles, California and features Elliott dressed in a gold-lamé bandleader costume, getting animated as a stick figure, and rapping in a patois. Stick It actor Jeff Bridges and Olympic gold medalist Dominique Dawes make cameo appearances in the video. Elliott also does some gymnastics in "We Run This" which caused her to tear her Achilles' tendon while shooting her scenes. "We Run This" incorporates a mini-video for another track from The Cookbook, "Bad Man," which was tacked to the beginning of the video. The video won Louis Mackall and Tonia Wallander the MTV Video Music Award for Best Visual Effects at the 2006 ceremony.

== Track listings ==
Digital download (original)

1. "We Run This" (Explicit Album Version w/o Manicure Interlude) - 3:25

Digital download (Stick It)

1. "We Run This" (Stick It Edit) - 3:02
2. "We Run This" (Stick It Video) - 4:14

UK CD

1. "We Run This" (Explicit Album Version) - 3:25
2. "Teary Eyed" (Tief Schwarz Club Remix) - 7:37

UK vinyl

1. "We Run This" (Explicit Album Version) - 3:24
2. "We Run This" (Instrumental) - 3:24
3. "We Run This" (A cappella) - 3:23
4. "Teary Eyed" (Tief Schwarz Club Remix) - 7:37

== Personnel ==
Personnel are lifted from the liner notes of The Cookbook.

- Missy Elliott – vocals, writing
- Serban Ghenea – mixing engineer
- Jerry Lordan – writing (sample)
- Rhemario "Rio Beats" Webber – production, writing

== Charts ==
Weekly chart performance for "We Run This"
Chart (2006)	Peak position
Australia (ARIA)	23
Australian Urban (ARIA)	7
Germany (GfK)	73
Ireland (IRMA)	30
Scottish Singles Sales (Official Charts)	40
UK Singles (Official Charts)	38
UK Hip Hop/R&B (Official Charts)	7
US Billboard Hot 100	48

== Release history ==
Release dates and formats for "We Run This"
Region	Date	Format(s)	Label(s)	Ref.
United States	March 20, 2006	Rhythmic contemporary; urban radio	The Goldmind Inc.; Atlantic	
United Kingdom	August 21, 2006	CD	The Goldmind Inc.; Atlantic	
Australia	August 28, 2006	CD	The Goldmind Inc.; Atlantic	
