= Clear (Cybotron song) =

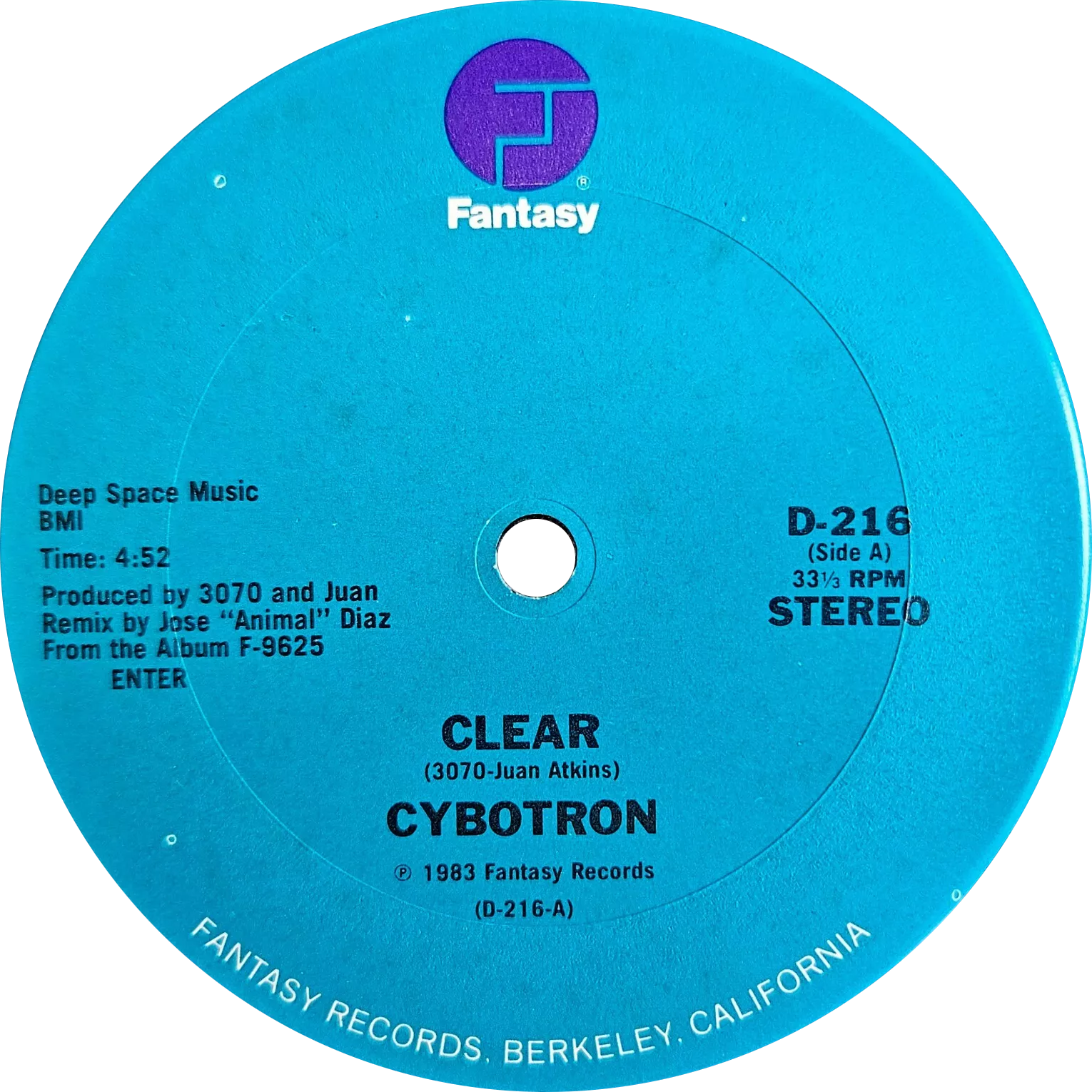
- Side A of the retail 12-inch US single

Single by Cybotron

from the album Enter
- B-side: "Industrial Lies"
- Released: 1983
- Recorded: April 1982
- Genre: Electro; Detroit techno; techno
- Length: 4:54 (radio edit)
- Label: Fantasy
- Songwriters: Juan Atkins; Richard Davis
- Producer: Juan Atkins

Cybotron singles chronology
| "Cosmic Cars" (1982) | "Clear" (1983) | "Techno City" (1984) |

"Clear" is an electro song performed by the American group Cybotron, and composed by Cybotron members Juan Atkins and Richard Davis. It was released in 1983 by Fantasy Records as the third single from their debut studio album, Enter (1983).

== Commercial performance and reception ==
Dennis Romero of Los Angeles Times in 1993 described the "Kraftwerk-sampling song" as "[i]nspired by Afrika Bambaataa's [...] 'Planet Rock'" and filled "with high-flying synthesizer loops, hard-driving beats and sparse, Chipmunk-style vocals-all elements", used in later techno songs as of September 1993.

At least fifty thousand copies of the "Clear" single were sold, according to a 1997 article in The Wire, which describes the song as a "groundbreaking…first-generation piece of pure machine music."

Cyclone Wehner of the Gold Coast Bulletin in 2005 described the song as precedence of Detroit techno and "Timbaland's tech-hop".

== Later uses ==
The song's instantly recognizable loop has been sampled by many rap, hip-hop and freestyle music artists such as Missy Elliott's "Lose Control", Poison Clan's "Shake Whatcha Mama Gave Ya" and Stevie B's "When Your Heart Is Calling".

== Legacy ==
In 2015, LA Weekly ranked "Clear" number four in their list of "The 20 Best Dance Music Tracks in History", writing, "More than 30 years later, the cascading synths and robotic vocals of 'Clear' still have the power to mesmerize. Co-produced by Juan Atkins — along with Kevin Saunderson and Derrick May, part of the "Belleville Three" credited with inventing techno — and Richard Davis, 'Clear' actually pre-dates Atkins' use of the term "techno" to describe his music. But its repetitive rhythms and alien soundscapes laid the foundation not just for Detroit techno, but for all electronic dance music that followed." In 2020, Slant Magazine ranked it number 32 in their list of "The 100 Best Dance Songs of All Time". In 2025, Billboard magazine ranked it number 77 in their list of "The 100 Best Dance Songs of All Time".
