= Soul Train Music Award for Best R&B/Soul or Rap Dance Cut =

Annual US music award

This page lists the winners and nominees for the Soul Train Music Award for Best R&B/Soul or Rap Dance Cut, also called the Sprite Award. This award was only given between the years 2005 and 2007.

== Winners and nominees ==
Winners are listed first and highlighted in bold.

=== 2000s ===
Year	Artist	Single	Ref
2005
2005	**Usher (featuring Ludacris and Lil' Jon)**	**"Yeah!"**	
2005	Ciara (featuring Petey Pablo)	"Goodies"	
2005	Snoop Dogg (featuring Pharrell)	"Drop It Like It's Hot"	
2005	LL Cool J	"Headsprung"	
2006
2006	**Missy Elliott (featuring Ciara and Fat Man Scoop)**	**"Lose Control"**	
2006	The Black Eyed Peas	"My Humps"	
2006	Gwen Stefani	"Hollaback Girl"	
2006	Kanye West (featuring Jamie Foxx)	"Gold Digger"	
2007
2007	**DJ Webstar and Young B. (featuring The Voice of Harlem)**	**"Chicken Noodle Soup"**	
2007	Dem Franchize Boyz (featuring Lil Peanut and Charlay)	"Lean wit It, Rock wit It"	
2007	Sean Paul	"Give It Up to Me"	
2007	Yung Joc	"It's Goin' Down"	
