= Americans for the Arts =

Non-profit organization in the USA

- Formation: 1960; 62 years ago
- Headquarters: Washington, D.C.
- CEO: Erin Harkey
- Website: https://www.americansforthearts.org/

Americans for the Arts is a nonprofit organization whose primary focus is advancing the arts in the United States with offices in Washington, D.C., and New York City, and more than 50 years of service. Americans for the Arts is dedicated to representing and serving local communities, and creating opportunities for every American to participate in and appreciate all forms of the arts.

Americans for the Arts was founded in 1996 as a result of a merger between the National Assembly of Local Arts Agencies (NALAA) and the American Council for the Arts (ACA). In 2005, the two merged again with Arts & Business Council Inc., also known as Arts & Business Council of New York.

== Goals ==
Its mission is to serve, advance, and lead the network of organizations and individuals who cultivate, promote, sustain, and support the arts in America. Americans for the Arts focuses on four primary goals:

- Lead and serve individuals and organizations to help build environments in which the arts and arts education thrive and contribute to more vibrant and creative communities.
- Generate meaningful public and private sector policies and more leaders and resources for the arts and arts education.
- Build individual awareness and appreciation of the value of the arts and arts education.
- Ensure the operational stability of the organization and its ability to creatively respond to opportunities and challenges.

Americans for the Arts achieves these goals in partnership with local, state, and national arts organizations; government agencies; business leaders; individual philanthropists; educators; and funders throughout the country. In addition, Americans for the Arts produces annual events to heighten visibility for the arts, including the National Arts Awards, which recognize those artists and arts leaders who exhibit exemplary national leadership and whose work demonstrates extraordinary artistic achievement; BCA 10,[1] which recognizes ten U.S. companies for their exceptional commitment to the arts through grants, local partnerships, volunteer programs, matching gifts, sponsorships, and board membership; and the Public Leadership in the Arts Awards[2] (in cooperation with The United States Conference of Mayors) honoring elected officials in local, state and federal government for their support of the arts.

Through national visibility campaigns and local outreach, Americans for the Arts strives to motivate and mobilize opinion leaders and decision-makers who can ensure the arts thrive in America. As host of the national Arts Advocacy Day on Capitol Hill, Americans for the Arts annually convenes arts advocates from across the country to advance federal support of the arts, humanities, and arts education. The Americans for the Arts Action Fund[3] is its affiliate 501(c)(4) organization that seeks to mobilize one million grassroots advocates to advance pro-arts public policies at the federal, state, and local levels. Membership in the Arts Action Fund is free.

To inform decision-makers about the arts, Americans for the Arts gathers, generates, and disseminates data, information, and the tools needed by arts industry stakeholders. Its areas of focus expand the conversation about arts policy, foster greater awareness of the role and value of the arts in community life, and promote greater access to the arts by advancing community-based cultural organizations nationwide. Americans for the Arts conducts both quantitative and qualitative research studies on segments of America’s nonprofit and for-profit arts industries.

Americans for the Arts serves more than 150,000 organizational and individual members and stakeholders. Local arts agencies throughout the United States comprise Americans for the Arts’ core constituency. It also serves a variety of unique partner networks with particular interests, including public art, united arts fundraising, arts education and emerging arts leaders.

== Impact ==
An October 2023 Americans for the Arts released a study including this: "The study found that in 2022, nonprofit arts and culture organizations and their audiences generated $151.7 billion in economic activity—$73.3 billion in spending by the organizations, which leveraged an additional $78.4 billion in event-related spending by their audiences. That economic activity supported 2.6 million jobs, generated $29.1 billion in tax revenue." The survey involved 224,000 audience members and over 16,000 organizations in all 50 states and Puerto Rico over an 18 month period to collect the data.
