= Lose Control (Missy Elliott song) =

2005 single by Missy Elliott

Single by Missy Elliott featuring Ciara and Fatman Scoop

from the album The Cookbook
- Released: May 23, 2005
- Recorded: 2005
- Studio: The Hit Factory (New York City, New York)
- Genre: Hip-hop; Miami bass; dance
- Length: 3:47
- Label: Goldmind; Atlantic
- Songwriters: Melissa Elliott; Ciara Harris; Isaac Freeman III; Juan Atkins; Richard Davis; Curtis Hudson
- Producer: Missy Elliott

Missy Elliott singles chronology
"Free Yourself" (2005)	"Lose Control" (2005)	"Teary Eyed" (2005)

Ciara singles chronology
"Oh" (2005)	"Lose Control" (2005)	"Like You" (2005)

Fatman Scoop singles chronology
"In the Club" (2004)	"Lose Control" (2005)	"Take the Lead (Wanna Ride)" (2006)

Music video
- "Lose Control" on YouTube

"Lose Control" is a song by American rapper Missy Elliott featuring American singer Ciara and American hip-hop artist Fatman Scoop. It was released as the lead single from Elliott's sixth studio album, The Cookbook, on May 23, 2005. It contains samples from Hot Streak's "Body Work" and Cybotron's "Clear". The song peaked at number three on the US Billboard Hot 100, number two in New Zealand, and in the top 30 in various countries.

== Conception ==
"Lose Control" was written by Missy Elliott, Ciara, Fatman Scoop, Juan Atkins, Richard Davis, and Curtis Hudson, and produced by Elliott. The song is an uptempo electronic dance track and contains samples of "Clear" by Cybotron and "Body Work" by Hot Streak, of which Curtis Hudson was a member.

In March 2005, Ciara confirmed she would appear on The Cookbook, singing and rapping on the potential first untitled single at the time. She explained the song's meaning, saying, "It's about music, how music makes you feel and makes you lose control." While recording the song, Elliott stated, "The only person who can pull something off with me [on this track] is Ciara, because it's a record with speed." She went on to say that the toughest part of making the song was convincing Ciara to rap. In the process, Ciara asked Elliott, "Is this gonna sound messed up? My fans are gonna be mad." Along with "On & On", "Lose Control" was released in advance of The Cookbook to determine which song would serve as the lead single.

== Critical reception ==
"Lose Control" received favorable reviews from critics. Virgin Media gave the song four out of five stars, calling the song "irresistibly danceable", saying that the sample was "a great spin on the original Cybotron material." In the album review, John Bush of AllMusic said the song was a "nod to the type of old-school party jam that Elliott does better than ever." Brian Hiatt of Rolling Stone called the song one of the "best tracks" on the album The Cookbook. The song was certified gold by the RIAA.

The video for "Lose Control" was nominated for six MTV Video Music Awards, including Breakthrough Video, Best Direction in a Video, Best Choreography in a Video and Best Special Effects in a Video. It went on to win two, Best Hip-Hop Video and Best Dance Video at the 2005 MTV Video Music Awards. It also won a Grammy Award for Best Short Form Music Video, while the song itself received a nomination for Best Rap Song at the 48th Annual Grammy Awards. The video won Best R&B/Soul or Rap Music Video at the 2005 Soul Train Lady of Soul Awards and was nominated for The Michael Jackson Award for Best R&B/Soul or Rap Music Video and Best R&B/Soul or Rap Dance Cut at the 2005 Soul Train Music Awards. It was also nominated for Video of the Year at the 2006 BET Awards. "Lose Control" was ranked in the top songs of 2005 by Pitchfork Media, where it ranked at number 23, numbers 14 and 49 on the Billboard Hot 100 and the Hot R&B/Hip-Hop Songs, respectively and number 12 on About.com. Stereogum and Paste ranked the song number nine and number five, respectively, on their lists of the 10 greatest Missy Elliott Songs.

== Music video ==
Directed by Dave Meyers, the music video starts off in a solid black room with dancers. Later, Elliott is seen buried in sand and slowly emerges in front of three other dancers. Elliott's head is added digitally to a different body. The next scene is in an old wooden house and in rows of dancers as they continue to dance. After that there are rows of people dancing outside of a building with the people dressed in vintage clothes and the footage filtered to look very old and grainy with some colors flattened and others oversaturated. They then end up on a desert road near a truck, where a single line of dancers finish dancing. The video then switches over to the song "On & On", where three dancers dance in sand as Elliott dances and levitates over a wooden plank, later accompanied by Tommy Lee. Lee described the act as "cool wire work to fly around". In 2005, the music video for "Lose Control" was the most played video on BET and MTV2 and second most played video in the United States, although many of them edited out the "On & On" section.

== Legacy ==
In September 2025, DJ and producer Don Diablo released a remixed version of "Lose Control" as a single, credited solely to himself.

== Track listings ==
- UK 12-inch single

A1. "Lose Control" (explicit version)
A2. "Lose Control" (instrumental version)
B1. "Lose Control" (extended version)

- UK CD and digital download
1. "Lose Control" (explicit album version) – 3:30
2. "Lose Control" (extended version) – 4:51
- Australian CD single
1. "Lose Control" (explicit version)
2. "Lose Control" (extended version)
3. "Lose Control" (instrumental version)

== Personnel ==
- Marcella Araica – assistant engineering
- Chris Brown – assistant engineering
- Vadim Chislov – assistant engineering
- Paul J. Falcone – mixing
- Eric Jensen – assistant engineering
- Rayshawn Woolard – assistant engineering

== Charts ==
=== Weekly charts ===
Chart (2005–2006)	Peak position
Australia (ARIA)	7
Australian Urban (ARIA)	3
Austria (Ö3 Austria Top 40)	70
Belgium (Ultratop 50 Flanders)	24
Belgium (Ultratop 50 Wallonia)	29
Canada CHR/Pop Top 30 (Radio & Records)	12
Denmark (Tracklisten)	6
Europe (Eurochart Hot 100 Singles)	18
Finland (Suomen virallinen lista)	7
Germany (GfK)	25
Ireland (IRMA)	16
Italy (FIMI)	18
Netherlands (Dutch Top 40)	39
Netherlands (Single Top 100)	24
New Zealand (Recorded Music NZ)	2
Scottish Singles Sales (Official Charts)	13
Sweden (Sverigetopplistan)	43
Switzerland (Schweizer Hitparade)	21
UK Singles (Official Charts)	7
UK Hip Hop/R&B (Official Charts)	3
US Billboard Hot 100	3
US Dance Club Songs (Billboard) Remixes	5
US Dance Airplay (Billboard)	13
US Hot R&B/Hip-Hop Songs (Billboard)	6
US Hot Rap Songs (Billboard)	3
US Pop 100 (Billboard)	2
US Pop Airplay (Billboard)	6
US Rhythmic Airplay (Billboard)	9

Chart (2015)	Peak position
US Hot R&B/Hip-Hop Songs (Billboard)	17

=== Year-end charts ===
Chart (2005)	Position
Australia (ARIA)	41
Belgium (Ultratop 50 Flanders)	100
Brazil (Crowley)	88
UK Singles (OCC)	61
UK Urban (Music Week)	21
US Billboard Hot 100	14
US Hot R&B/Hip-Hop Songs (Billboard)	49
US Mainstream Top 40 (Billboard)	31
US Rhythmic Top 40 (Billboard)	21

Chart (2006)	Position
Brazil (Crowley)	84

== Certifications ==
Region	Certification	Certified units/sales
New Zealand (RMNZ)	Platinum	30,000^{‡}
United Kingdom (BPI)	Gold	400,000^{‡}
United States (RIAA)	3× Platinum	3,000,000^{‡}
^{‡} Sales+streaming figures based on certification alone.

== Release history ==
Region	Date	Format(s)	Label(s)	Ref.
United States	May 23, 2005	Rhythmic contemporary radio	Goldmind; Atlantic	
United States	June 13, 2005	Contemporary hit radio	Goldmind; Atlantic	
United Kingdom	June 20, 2005	12-inch vinyl; CD	Goldmind; Atlantic	
Australia	July 4, 2005	CD	Goldmind; Atlantic	
