= David Carroll (actor) =

American actor

David James Carroll
- Born: July 30, 1950; Rockville Centre, New York, U.S.
- Died: March 11, 1992 (aged 41)
- Education: Dartmouth College
- Occupations: Actor, singer
- Years active: 1974–1992
- Known for: Grand Hotel, Chess

David Carroll (July 30, 1950 – March 11, 1992), sometimes billed as David James Carroll, was an American actor whose last, and best remembered, role was that of Baron Felix von Gaigern in Grand Hotel: The Musical. He also played the role of Anatoly Sergievsky in the original Broadway cast of Chess. Both roles earned him Tony Award nominations for Best Actor in a Musical: in 1988 for Chess and again in 1990 for Grand Hotel.

Carroll was born in Rockville Centre, New York, grew up in Greenwich, Connecticut, and graduated from Dartmouth College, where he was an active member of the Dartmouth Players. While at Dartmouth Carroll had star roles in several college musicals and in community theater.

Carroll also received three Drama Desk Awards nominations as an Outstanding Actor in a Musical: La bohème (1984) he costarred with Linda Ronstadt, Chess (1988), and Grand Hotel (1990). The Original Broadway Cast recording of Chess received a 1988 Grammy Award nomination for Best Musical Cast Show album. On the big screen, he had a brief scene with John Ritter in the movie Hero at Large.

Suffering from AIDS, he died of a pulmonary embolism in the restroom of the New York City BMG/RCA studio while attempting to record the cast album for Grand Hotel. The album had been delayed for years because of rights issues and legal disputes over the score. For the cast recording Brent Barrett ultimately performed the role of the Baron, but Carroll was featured on a bonus track: singing the Baron's solo number "Love Can't Happen", recorded during his cabaret performance at Steve McGraw's on February 14, 1991 with Wally Harper at the piano.

His long-time partner, Robert W. Homma, died on April 18, 2006.

== Broadway ==
- Where's Charley? (1974) (understudy)
- Rodgers & Hart (1975)
- Oh, Brother! (1981)
- Seven Brides for Seven Brothers (1982) - Adam
- Wind in the Willows (1985) - Rat
- Chess (1988) - Anatoly Sergievsky
- Cafe Crown (1989)
- Grand Hotel (1989) - Baron Felix von Gaigern

== Off-Broadway ==
- Joseph and the Amazing Technicolor Dreamcoat 1976 (originated the title role at the Brooklyn Academy of Music)
- La bohème 1984 (at The Joseph Papp Public Theater)

== Filmography ==
Year	Title	Role	Notes
1975	Musical Chairs	Himself	TV series, 1 episode
1976	Ball Four	Bill Westlake	TV series, 5 episodes
1979	Paris	Donald Perth	episode: "Pawn"
1979	The Rockford Files	Randy Smith	episode: "Love Is the Word"
1979	CHiPs	Chuck	TV series, 1 episode
1980	Knots Landing	David Crane	episode: "Let Me Count the Ways"
1980	Hero at Large	Actor on Bus	
1980	To Race the Wind	Jerry Baker	TV movie
1980	The Seduction of Miss Leona	Borgland	TV movie
1980	The Promise of Love	Chuck Wakemore	TV movie
1981	The Secret War of Jackie's Girls	David	TV movie
1981	Splendor in the Grass	Johnny Masterson	TV movie, (final film role)
