= John Wylie (actor) =

American actor (1925–2004)

John Wylie (December 14, 1925 – May 11, 2004) was an American actor, who appeared in many live theater performances, television programs, and films. He was born in Peacock, Texas, and died of natural causes in New York City.

Wylie debuted as an actor in 1954 at the Alley Theatre in Houston, while he was working as a research chemist. He acted with that theatre's company until 1985 and directed some of its productions.

Wylie created the role of Col. Doctor Otternshlag in the original Broadway production of Grand Hotel under the direction of Tommy Tune. He also portrayed Senator Norval Hedges in Born Yesterday on Broadway in 1989.

Wylie toured in a 1987–88 production of Man of La Mancha in the starring role of Don Miguel De Cervantes/Don Quitxote. In 1993, he played Ebeneezer Scrooge in a production of A Christmas Carol at the Victoria Theatre in Dayton, Ohio.

On television he played John Dickinson in the mini-series, The Adams Chronicles.
