= Tim Jerome =

American actor (born 1943)

- Born: December 29, 1943 (age 82)
- Occupation: Actor

Timothy Jerome (born December 29, 1943, Los Angeles, California) is an American stage, film, and television actor.

== Biography ==
After attending Cornell University, Ithaca College (BFA), and the Manhattan School of Music (Master of Music), Jerome made his Broadway debut in 1969 as Dr. Carrasco in “Man of La Mancha”. He has subsequently appeared in more than a dozen productions on Broadway, including as Monsieur Firmin in “The Phantom of the Opera”.

Jerome was nominated for the 1987 Tony Award as Best Actor (Featured Role – Musical) for Me and My Girl. As Alfred P. Doolittle in the 2007–2008 national tour of My Fair Lady he received the Carbonell Award and was nominated for the Helen Hayes Award. He received a Special Award from the New England Theatre Conference in 2008 for Outstanding Achievement in the American Theatre.

The Founding President of the National Music Theater Network (the parent organization of the New York Musical Festival, NYMF), Jerome is also the Founding President of Mainstreet Musicals, a non-profit organization that facilitates the development of new musicals. During the 1970s, Jerome worked as part of a team to produce approximately 40 radio dramas for WBAI-FM. A past board member of the Screen Actors Guild (SAG) and former 1st Vice President of The American Guild of Musical Artists (AGMA), Jerome has also served as a Councilor of the Actors’ Equity Association.

== Appearances ==
=== Broadway ===
- The Phantom of the Opera (Monsieur Firmin)
- The Lyons (Ben Lyons - understudy)
- Tarzan (Professor Porter)
- Baz Luhrmann’s La Bohème (Alcindoro, Benoit)
- Beauty and the Beast (Maurice)
- Lost in Yonkers (Eddie)
- Grand Hotel (Preysing)
- Me and My Girl (Herbert Parchester)
- Cats (Bustopher Jones, Asparagus, Growltiger)
- The Moony Shapiro Songbook (Moony Shapiro)
- Arthur Miller's Creation of the World and Other Business
- The Magic Show
- The Rothschilds (Amshel Rothschild; Nathan Rothschild)
- Man of La Mancha (Dr. Carrasco); also National Tour (Quixote understudy)

=== Off-Broadway ===
- ”Pretzels” (Phoenix Theatre)
- ”Sullivan & Gilbert (Phoenix Theater) - Sullivan
- ”The Petrified Prince” (New York Shakespeare Festival) - Cardinal Pointy
- ”Collette Collage” (York Theatre) - Willy
- ”The Beggar’s Opera” (Chelsea Theatre) - MacHeath
- ”Romance in Hard Times” (New York Shakespeare Festival) - Polly
- ”Sonya” (Phoenix) - Doctor
- ”Dracula” (Little Shubert Theater)
- ”Flamingo Court” (New World Stages)
- ”Two Jews Talking” (Theatre of St. Clement's)

=== Regional ===
- Arena Stage (Washington, DC): “Tintypes”; "Tomfoolery”
- Goodspeed Musicals (Chester, CT)
- George Street Playhouse (New Brunswick, NJ): “The Sisters Rosensweig”; “Human Events”; “The Diary of Anne Frank”; “Lorenzo”
- McCarter Theatre (Princeton, NJ)
- North Shore Music Theatre (Beverly, MA): “Tom Jones”
- Benedum Center for the Performing Arts (Pittsburgh, PA): “Me and My Girl” (Parchester)

=== National Tour ===
- “My Fair Lady” (2007-2008; 26 cities) - Alfred P. Doolittle

=== Film ===
- Getting Wasted (1980) - Mr. Graham
- Compromising Positions (1985) - Rabbi
- Betrayed (1988) - Jud / Bartender
- Billy Bathgate (1991) - Dixie Davis
- Husbands and Wives (1992) - Paul
- I.Q. (1994) - Academic
- Everyone Says I Love You (1996) - X-Ray Room Doctor
- Deconstructing Harry (1997) - Director
- A Price Above Rubies (1998) - Dr. Bauer
- Mixing Nia (1998) - Harvey
- Celebrity (1998) - Hotel Clerk
- Cradle Will Rock (1999) - Maxine Elliot's - Bert Weston
- Thirteen Days (2000) - Journalist
- Sidewalks of New York (2001) - Dr. Lance
- Spider-Man 2 (2004) - Injured Scientist
- The Third Testament (2010) - Dr. Dorian Ness

=== Television ===
- Barney Miller (1977) - Harold Sanders
- Lou Grant (1977) - Murray
- The Tony Randall Show (1978) - Carlson Jr.
- Laverne & Shirley (1978) - Dr. Schoenbroom
- The Days and Nights of Molly Dodd (1991) - Steven Sauer
- Law & Order (2004) - Sam Laval
- Third Watch (2005) - Peter Lynch
- Person of Interest (2013) - Ancient Banker
- Wizard of Lies (2017, TV Movie, HBO) - Burt Ross
