= Teary Eyed =

2005 single by Missy Elliott

Single by Missy Elliott

from the album The Cookbook
- Released: September 12, 2005
- Length: 3:40
- Label: Goldmind; Atlantic
- Songwriters: Melissa Elliott; Warryn Campbell
- Producer: Warryn Campbell

Missy Elliott singles chronology
"Lose Control" (2005)	"Teary Eyed" (2005)	"We Run This" (2006)

Music video
- "Teary Eyed" on YouTube

"Teary Eyed" a song by American recording artist Missy Elliott. It was written by Elliott and Warryn Campbell for her sixth studio album, The Cookbook (2005), while production was handled by the latter. Released as the album's second single on September 12, 2005, following "Lose Control" (2005), the song reached the top 50 in Australia, Ireland, Switzerland, and the United Kingdom

== Chart performance ==
In the United States, "Teary Eyed" did not appear on the Billboard Hot 100. In the United Kingdom, the song was released on September 26, 2005, but it was also unsuccessful there, peaking at number 47. On the issue date of February 11, 2006, the song debuted at number 45 on the Billboard Hot Dance Club Play chart, and the following month, it peaked within the top five of the Hot Dance Singles Sales chart. In Australia, "Teary Eyed" reached the top 40 of the ARIA Singles Chart, peaking at number 36.

== Music video ==
The music video for "Teary Eyed" was directed by Antti Jokinen and Elliott. It takes place mainly in an insane asylum with Elliott in a straight jacket. In between cuts she is looking at an injured man on a hospital bed (the man she is singing about). As usual Elliot uses her sample technique to promote the song "Meltdown" by performing in the middle of the video. There are various shots of a car flipping and bursting into flames due to Elliott stabbing a hole in the front left tire out of her anger.

== Track listings ==
UK CD

1. "Teary Eyed" (radio version)
2. "Lose Control" (Jacques Lu Cont mix edit featuring Ciara and Fatman Scoop)
3. "Teary Eyed" (video)

UK vinyl

1. "Teary Eyed" (radio version)
2. "Teary Eyed" (instrumental)
3. "Teary Eyed" (a capella)
4. "Lose Control" (Jacques Lu Cont mix featuring Ciara and Fatman Scoop)

Remixes CD

1. "Teary Eyed" (Tiefschwarz club mix)
2. "Teary Eyed" (Maurice Beats)
3. "Teary Eyed" (ATFC club mix)
4. "Teary Eyed" (ATFC Drumdub)
5. "Teary Eyed" (Maurice club mix)
6. "Teary Eyed" (Tiefschwarz dub)
7. "Teary Eyed" (Sugardip club)
8. "Teary Eyed" (Sugardip Morning After mix)

== Charts ==
Weekly chart performance for "Teary Eyed"
Chart (2005)	Peak position
Australia (ARIA)	38
Australian Urban (ARIA)	14
Germany (GfK)	64
Ireland (IRMA)	44
Scottish Singles Sales (Official Charts)	56
Switzerland (Schweizer Hitparade)	38
UK Singles (Official Charts)	47
UK Hip Hop/R&B (Official Charts)	8
US Dance Club Songs (Billboard)	30
US Dance Singles Sales (Billboard)	5

== Release history ==
Release dates and formats for "Teary Eyed"
Region	Date	Format(s)	Label(s)	Ref.
United States	September 12, 2005	Rhythmic contemporary; urban radio	Goldmind; Atlantic	
United Kingdom	September 26, 2005	CD	Goldmind; Atlantic	
Australia	October 24, 2005	CD	Goldmind; Atlantic	
