= Take the Lead (Wanna Ride) =

2006 single by Bone Thugs-n-Harmony and Wisin & Yandel

Single by Bone Thugs-n-Harmony and Wisin & Yandel featuring Fatman Scoop and Melissa Jiménez

from the album Take the Lead (Original Motion Picture Soundtrack)
- Released: March 21, 2006
- Recorded: 2005–2006
- Genre: Hip hop, reggaeton
- Length: 3:28 (Album/Radio version); 3:54 (Main version ft. Drag-On)
- Label: Republic/Universal
- Songwriters: Kasseem Dean, Isaac Freeman, Anthony Henderson, Steven Howse, Melissa Jiménez, Juan Luis Morera Luna, Charles Scruggs, Mel Smalls, Llandel Veguilla Malavé
- Producer: Swizz Beatz

Bone Thugs-n-Harmony singles chronology
"Home" (2003)	"Take the Lead (Wanna Ride)" (2006)	"Fire" (2006)

Wisin & Yandel singles chronology
"Llamé Pa' Verte (Bailando Sexy)" (2006)	"Take the Lead (Wanna Ride)" (2006)	"El Teléfono" (2006)

Melissa Jiménez singles chronology
"Feel It in the Air" (2005)	"Take the Lead (Wanna Ride)" (2006)	"Untouchable" (2007)

Fatman Scoop singles chronology
"Lose Control" (2005)	"Take the Lead (Wanna Ride)" (2006)	"Dance!" (2006)

"Take the Lead (Wanna Ride)" is a single by American hip hop group Bone Thugs-n-Harmony and Puerto Rican reggaeton duo Wisin & Yandel, released on March 21, 2006 by Republic Records and Universal. It features Fatman Scoop and Melissa Jiménez, and was released from the soundtrack to the 2006 film Take the Lead. The song was produced by Swizz Beatz, who also produced most of the songs on the soundtrack. The soundtrack contains the radio edit version, while the film features the alternate version with rapper Drag-On at the end.

== Track listings and formats ==
US promo CD single

1. "Take the Lead (Wanna Ride)" (radio edit)

US Promo 12-inch vinyl

1. "Take the Lead (Wanna Ride)"
2. "Take the Lead (Wanna Ride)" (instrumental)
3. "Take the Lead (Wanna Ride)" (main version, featuring Drag-On)

== Chart performance ==
Due to a lack of airplay, it did not chart on the Billboard Hot 100. However, it reached No. 44 on the U.S. Billboard Hot Latin Songs chart.

=== Chart positions ===
Chart (2006)	Peak position
U.S. Billboard Hot Latin Songs	44
U.S. Billboard Latin Rhythm Airplay	18

== Release history ==
Region	Date	Format
United States	March 21, 2006	Digital download, CD single
United States	April 18, 2006	12" single
