= Pierre Dulaine =

Palestinian Dance Instructor

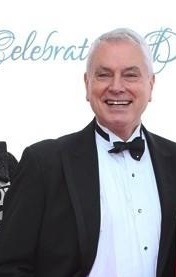
- Dulaine in 2014
- Born: Peter Gordon Heney; April 23, 1944 (age 82); Jaffa, Mandatory Palestine
- Known for: Dancing Classrooms
- Website: dancingclassrooms.org

Pierre Dulaine (born 23 April 1944) is a dance instructor and dancer. He invented the Dulaine method of teaching dance. He also founded Dancing Classrooms, a social and emotional development program for 5th grade children that uses ballroom dancing as a vehicle to change the lives of the children and their families.

Notably, his early works with children was fictionalized in the film Take the Lead, starring Antonio Banderas as Pierre Dulaine.

The documentary film Mad Hot Ballroom follows a Ballroom Dancing with Dancing Classrooms competition.

== Early life and education ==
Pierre Dulaine was born in Jaffa, British Mandate of Palestine in 1944. His Irish father was serving with the British Army stationed in British Mandate Palestine; his mother is Palestinian. In 1948 his parents fled Israel. After eight months of moving several times, first in Cyprus, then in England and Ireland, Dulaine's family settled in Amman, Jordan. In 1956, the Suez Crisis forced Dulaine's parents to flee the area, eventually resettling in Birmingham, England.

== Career ==
Dulaine began his dancing career at the age of 14, and took his Associate Degree as a professional dancer when he was 18. He took three further majors exams aged 21 and became a full member of the Imperial Society of Teachers of Dancing.

In 1971 he worked as a solo dancer at the London Hippodrome, as well as working at a nightclub called L'Hirondelle. Dulaine moved to Nairobi, Kenya and worked for a year at the Nairobi Casino in cabaret with the Bluebell Troupe from Paris. After this, he became cruise director for a ship sailing from New York City to the Caribbean Islands. He then got a job at an Arthur Murray dance studio.

In January 1976, Dulaine became dance partners with Yvonne Marceau, who had arrived at the dance studio in 1973. The pair studied in England with John DelRoy, and won several awards. In 1984, they co-founded the American Ballroom Theater Company with Otto Cappel. The Company debuted at the Dance Theatre Workshop in October 1984, and toured widely in the late 1980s. From July 1989 to 1990, the pair appeared in Tommy Tune's Broadway show Grand Hotel, finishing with a five-month run in the West End.

In 1994 Dulaine founded the Dancing Classrooms program for the New York City Department of Education. He also invented the "Dulaine Method" to encourage children to dance together. He later travelled to Northern Ireland to teach the same program. In 2011 Dulaine travelled to Jaffa, the city of his birth to teach the method and make the 2013 film Dancing in Jaffa.

== See also ==
- List of teachers portrayed in films
- Take the Lead
