= Yvonne Marceau =

Yvonne Marceau is an American ballroom dancer, choreographer, and dance instructor.

== Biography ==
She was born in Chicago, Illinois, and holds a B.F.A. from the University of Utah as well as an associate degree from the Imperial Society of Ballroom Dance. In 1984, Marceau co-founded American Ballroom Theater with her dance partner, Pierre Dulaine. Together, Marceau and Dulaine won numerous ballroom dance contests and were four-time winners of the British Exhibition ballroom competition. Marceau is the recipient of various awards, including the Astaire Award and the Dance Magazine Award. Along with Dulaine, Marceau co-founded the Ballroom Theater's Dancing Classrooms program, which is featured in the documentary Mad Hot Ballroom.

== Teaching ==
Marceau has been on the faculty at The Juilliard School since 1993 and has taught at the School of American Ballet as well as for numerous New York City social groups, including the Union Club and cotillion societies. Marceau also currently teaches at the NYU Tisch New Studio on Broadway.
