= Cybotron (American band) =

American electro music group

- Origin: Detroit, Michigan, U.S.
- Genres: Electronic; electro; techno
- Years active: 1980–present
- Labels: Deep Space; Fantasy; Tresor Records
- Members: Laurens von Oswald; Tameko Williams
- Past members: Juan Atkins; Richard "3070" Davis; John "Jon-5" Housely

Cybotron is an American electronic music group founded in 1980 in Detroit, Michigan, by Juan Atkins and Richard "3070" Davis. One of the earliest leaders of electronic music and instrumental in forming Detroit techno, Cybotron's music combined funk, electronic sounds and futuristic themes, which helped influence the sound and identity of early techno music. These tracks include "Alleys of Your Mind," "Clear," "Cosmic Cars" and "Techno City," which are considered early works in electronic music history. Media studies and people writing about techno have long considered Cybotron as a point from which to begin studying how it was born within Detroit's own socio-economic and cultural conditions.

== Influences ==
The group drew heavily from funk artists such as George Clinton, as well as electronic groups including Kraftwerk and Yellow Magic Orchestra. Cybotron was a musical project strongly influenced by futurist ideas and science fiction. Works such as Alvin Toffler’s book Future Shock introduced themes of technology, social change, and transformation. The group combined underground rhythms, electronic sounds, and futuristic concepts associated with Afrofuturism.

== Career ==
Cybotron originated in Detroit, an area marked by great economic decline and industrial change. Their earliest records “Alleys of Your Mind” and “Cosmic Cars” were made by the independent label, Deep Space Records, of Juan Atkins. They shot to national fame, notably by the radio of Detroit DJ The Electrifying Mojo. By 1983, Cybotron had made their first album of the group, “Enter.” It featured the song “Clear,” one of their more powerful pieces. They also utilized drum machines and synthesizers extensively to create experimentation with sounds and a more futuristic appearance, according to Juan Atkins. Atkins quit the band in 1985, after experiencing creative differences with Richard Davis. Davis continued to be releasing new music under the Cybotron name, and Atkins got a solo career going and formed Metroplex Records. A few years later came around to his subsequent work under his new name Model 500 went on to mold the Detroit techno sound. Cybotron reconnected with newer members and performances, with a reunion concert in London. This continued performance underscores the significance of their music in the history of electronic music.

== Relation to techno ==
While Cybotron is frequently considered as electronic, the group was involved in the emergence of techno. Cybotron’s music has been thought to be the basis for later music styles and to be part of the foundation of what would come to be known as Detroit techno. Their sound mixed machine rhythms, synthetic melodies and motifs about technology and the future. One aspect of Cybotron’s music that stood out was its machine-driven approach to songs. Drum machines and synthesizers weren’t just tools, they played a key role in the group’s creative process. This was reflected in Detroit techno more broadly, which artists used machines to communicate ideas for the future and urban life. Cybotron’s music had more to say about the social tone of Detroit in the 1980s. Economics and industries of the city set the mood for their work. The songs “Alleys of Your Mind” and “Techno City” depicted feelings of isolation, change and technological disruption through electronic sounds. In addition, Cybotron works in Afrofuturism, this genre explores the futures that black artists produce through technology and expression. Their futuristic song took it further, they were early examples of black speculative sound.

== Sound and technology ==
Cybotron music is noted for its heavy use of electronic instruments, especially a pair of drum machines and synthesizers. The tools enabled the group to generate repetitve, mechanical rhythms that became a staple of early techno. Utilization of technology was not only done, but it was innovative. Artists such as Juan Atkins played with sequencing, layering sounds and putting tracks together on trial and error runs. The notion of experimenting is often referred to in a way that speaks to the essential process of the formation of techno as well, in other words, how ideas from experimentation gave them their basis. Electronic music production was an emerging field in the 1980s and magazine like “Music Technology” reported how artists were employing new tools to produce new sounds. Cybotron’s music is part of a larger trend, in which musicians started playing more on machines than traditional instruments.

== Legacy ==
Cybotron’s presence is related to the global importance of techno music. The group had their beginnings in Detroit, but their footprint spread beyond the capital to Europe as well. By the late 1980s and early 1990s, Detroit techno had grown rapidly in the United Kingdom, where it influenced rave culture and electronic dance music. The lead track “Clear” is often considered one of the important early electronic music songs and has been sampled widely by and referenced by future artists. There you have it, demonstrating how Cybotron’s recordings have persisted and inspired generations of ancestors and musicians. Academics and journalists also argue Cybotron’s contributions to mapping music onto larger cultural ideas. The futurist themes, technology and urban experiences that they chose to address defined what techno could mean. Cybotron’s work is essential as to the origins of Detroit techno and its long-term impact. This long stretch of Cybotron’s work in Afrofuturism has also made more people aware of his work. As music and technology imagined new possibilities for black identity which made them significant not only musically but culturally too. It is interesting to observe the spirit of Cybotron’s influence on modern electronic music but also in its examination of the continued development of techno as an instrument of cultural change.

== Discography ==
=== Albums ===
- Enter (1983) (re-released as Clear in 1990)
- Empathy (1993) (without Juan Atkins)
- Cyber Ghetto (1995) (without Juan Atkins)

=== EP ===
- Maintain The Golden Ratio (Tresor Records, 2023)
- Parallel Shift (Tresor Records, 2024)

=== Singles ===
- "Alleys of Your Mind" b/w "Cosmic Raindance" (Deep Space, 1981)
- "Cosmic Cars" b/w "The Line" (Deep Space/Fantasy, 1982)
- "Clear" b/w "Industrial Lies" (Fantasy, 1983)
- "Techno City" (Fantasy, 1984)
- "R-9" (Fantasy, 1985)
- "Eden" (Fantasy, 1986)
