= Fatman Scoop =

American hip-hop artist (1968 or 1971 – 2024)

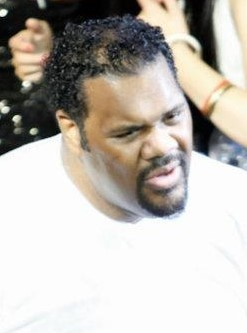
- Fatman Scoop performing in 2011

Background information
- Born: Isaac Freeman III; August 6, 1968 or 1971; Manhattan, New York City, U.S.
- Died: August 30, 2024 (aged 53 or 56) Connecticut, U.S.
- Genre: Hip-hop
- Occupations: Rapper; hype man; radio personality
- Years active: 1989–2024
- Label: Av8
- Children: 2
- Relatives: Kendell Freeman (brother)
- Website: fatmanscoop.com

Isaac Freeman III (August 6, 1968 or 1971 (Note: Some early news reports about Freeman's death stated that he was 53 and/or born in 1971. However, others have given his birth year as 1968 and his age as 56, including multiple sources that initially said he was 53 but subsequently issued corrections.) – August 30, 2024), better known by his stage name Fatman Scoop, was an American hip-hop artist. Noted for his booming, raw vocal presence on various hip-hop songs, he was best known for his guest performances on the 2005 singles "Lose Control" by Missy Elliott and "It's Like That" by Mariah Carey, as well as his 1999 sleeper hit single, "Be Faithful" (featuring the Crooklyn Clan), which topped the UK Singles Chart in 2003.

== Early life ==
Isaac Freeman III was born on August 6, (birth year is disputed: 1968 or 1971) in Manhattan, New York City, and grew up in Harlem, the son of Clara and Isaac Freeman Jr. He was educated at Cardinal Hayes High School and the New York Institute of Technology.

== Career ==
Freeman adopted the stage name "Fatman Scoop" from the nickname given to him by his Uncle Jack as a child, because he loved ice cream. He first came to prominence with the release of the single "Be Faithful" (featuring the Crooklyn Clan), which topped the charts in the United Kingdom and the Republic of Ireland in October 2003, four years after its original release, and peaked within the top ten of the charts in Denmark and Australia.

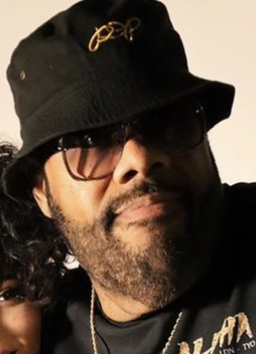
Fatman Scoop in 2022

Throughout his career, Fatman Scoop collaborated with numerous artists, including on Ying Yang Twins' 2004 remix of "Salt Shaker", Janet Jackson's 2006 remix of "So Excited", The Pussycat Dolls' 2008 remix of "When I Grow Up", David Guetta's 2009 remix of "One Love", and Skrillex's 2014 single "Recess".

In 2004, Fatman Scoop was featured in the UK TV series Chancers, broadcast on Channel 4, mentoring six British musicians trying to achieve success in the United States. In 2007, he had a role on the animated television series The Boondocks, appearing as himself in season 2, episode 5, "The Story of Thugnificent" and episode 15, "The Story of Gangstalicious Part 2" from the same season. In 2008, Fatman Scoop and his then-wife Shanda hosted a reality show and podcast on MTV called Man and Wife. The show covered topics such as jobs, finance, relationships, and sex.

On August 27, 2015, Fatman Scoop entered the Celebrity Big Brother 16: UK vs. USA house in the United Kingdom as a contestant. On September 14, he was the third housemate to be evicted, on day 20 where he finished in 11th place.

In July 2018, Fatman Scoop was featured on the remix to Ciara's single "Level Up", which also featured Missy Elliott; the single remix was the first song to feature all three artists since 2005's "Lose Control".

During the COVID-19 pandemic, being unable to travel, Fatman Scoop had to give up being a hype man, so he started up other businesses, including trucking and an ice cream company.

== Personal life ==
Freeman had two children. He married twice, once to Shanda Freeman. Together they starred in an MTV talk show titled Man and Wife. They divorced after 13 years together.

== Death ==
On August 30, 2024, Freeman collapsed during a performance in Hamden, Connecticut; CPR was administered at the scene and he was rushed to a nearby hospital. The following day, it was announced that he had died at the age of 53 or 56. His death was determined to be due to hypertensive heart disease and atherosclerosis.

== Discography ==
=== Compilation albums ===
- Fatman Scoop's Party Breaks: Volume 1 (2003)
- In the Club (2006)
- Party King (2015, Japan only)

=== Singles ===
List of singles, with selected chart positions and certifications, showing year released and album name
Title	Year	Peak chart positions										Certifications	Album
Title	Year	US R&B	US Rap	AUS	BEL (FL)	FRA	GER	IRL	NLD	SWI	UK	Certifications	Album
"Where U @?" (with The Crooklyn Clan)	1998	77	—	—	—	—	—	—	—	—	—		Non-album singles
"Be Faithful" (Note: The US chart positions for "Be Faithful" are from the single's original release in 1999; all other chart positions are from the single's 2003 re-release.) (featuring The Crooklyn Clan)	1999 / 2003	92	24	5	11	13	28	1	30	15	1	ARIA: Platinum; BPI: Gold	Non-album singles
"It Takes Scoop" (Note: The US chart positions for "It Takes Two" are from the single's original release in 2000; all other chart positions are from the single's 2004 remix.) (with DJ Kool)	2000 / 2004	85	12	24	44	—	—	15	—	33	9		Non-album singles
"Dance!" (with Lumidee and Goleo VI)	2006	—	—	—	—	30	5	—	70	32	—		Non-album singles
"U Sexy Girl" (featuring Elephant Man and Jabba)	2006	93	—	—	—	—	—	—	—	—	—		Non-album singles
"Talk 2 Me" (featuring Ken)	2007	—	—	—	—	—	89	—	—	—	—		Non-album singles
"Dance! 2013" (Fatman Scoop vs. Lumidee)	2013	—	—	—	—	—	63	—	—	61	—		Non-album singles
"—" denotes a recording that did not chart or was not released in that territory.													Non-album singles

=== Featured songs ===
- 2001: "Drop" (Timbaland & Magoo featuring Fatman Scoop)
- 2004: "Dat Sexy Body" (Remix) (Sasha featuring Fatman Scoop)
- 2004: "Salt Shaker" (Remix) (Ying Yang Twins featuring Fatman Scoop)
- 2005: "Lose Control" (Missy Elliott featuring Ciara and Fatman Scoop)
- 2005: "It's Like That" (Mariah Carey featuring Jermaine Dupri and Fatman Scoop)
- 2006: "Take the Lead (Wanna Ride)" (Bone Thugs-n-Harmony and Wisin & Yandel featuring Melissa Jiménez and Fatman Scoop)
- 2006: "So Excited" (Remix) (Janet Jackson featuring Fatman Scoop)
- 2007: "Behind the Cow" (Scooter featuring Fatman Scoop)
- 2008: "When I Grow Up" (Darkchild Remix) (The Pussycat Dolls featuring Fatman Scoop, Diddy, and Lil Wayne)
- 2008: "What You Got" (Remix) (Colby O'Donis featuring Fatman Scoop and Klepto)
- 2009: "Clear!" (Kardinal Offishall featuring Fatman Scoop)
- 2009: "One Love" (Remix) (David Guetta featuring Fatman Scoop)
- 2010: "Please Don't Break My Heart" (Kalomoira featuring Fatman Scoop)
- 2011: "Rock the Boat" (Bob Sinclar featuring Fatman Scoop, Pitbull and Dragonfly)
- 2011: "Drop It Low" (Remix) (Kat DeLuna featuring Fatman Scoop)
- 2014: "Recess" (Skrillex and Kill the Noise featuring Fatman Scoop and Michael Angelakos)
- 2015: "Don't Stop the Madness" (Hardwell and W&W featuring Fatman Scoop)
- 2018: "Level Up" (Remix) (Ciara featuring Missy Elliott and Fatman Scoop). SNEP: Gold

== Awards and nominations ==
=== Awards ===
- 2005: Grammy Award for Best Rap Song – Nomination – ("Lose Control", with Missy Elliott & Ciara)
- 2005: Smash Hits Poll Winners Party – Star Of The Year – Won – (voted best overall personality in 2005 by Smash Hits readers)
- 2005: Grammy Award for Best Short Form Music Video – Won – ("Lose Control", with Missy Elliott & Ciara)
- 2006: Soul Train Music Award for Best R&B/Soul or Rap Dance Cut – Won – ("Lose Control", with Missy Elliott & Ciara)

== See also ==
- List of people from Harlem
