= Richard Davis (techno artist) =

American composer and producer of techno music

Richard Davis (born 1952) is an American electronic music composer and producer, hailing from Detroit, Michigan.

A veteran of the Vietnam War, he and Juan Atkins met while students at Washtenaw Community College. Following this, they formed the group known as Cybotron in the early 1980s. Davis also released music of his own under the alias 3070. As Cybotron and 3070, Davis had a heavy hand in the foundation of Detroit's nascent techno music scene in the 1980s.
