= Nico =

German singer and actress (1938–1988)

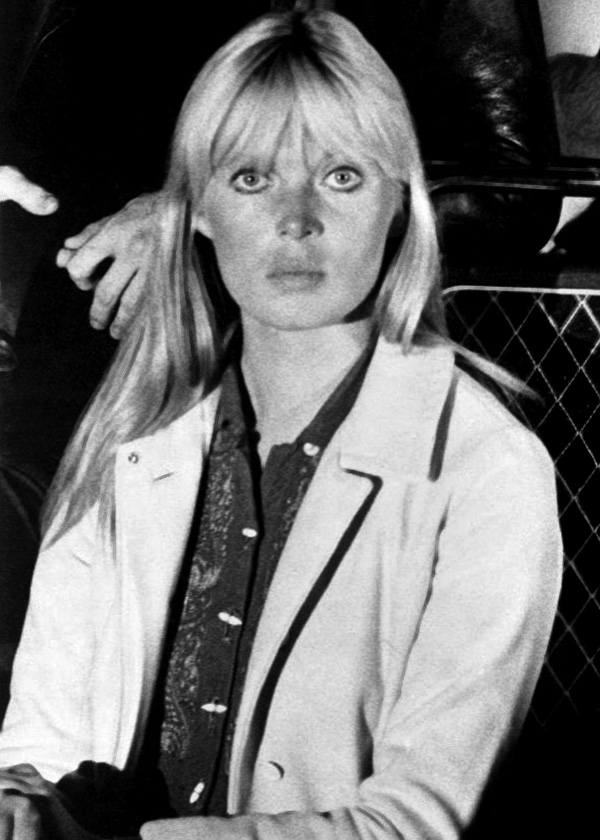
- Nico in 1966

Background information
- Born: Christa Päffgen; 16 October 1938; Cologne, Germany
- Died: 18 July 1988 (aged 49) Ibiza, Spain
- Genres: Avant-folk; art rock; gothic rock
- Occupations: Singer; songwriter; actress; model
- Instruments: Vocals; keyboards; harmonium; tambourine
- Years active: 1955–1988
- Labels: Verve; Elektra; Reprise; Island; Beggars Banquet
- Formerly of: The Velvet Underground

Christa Päffgen (German: [ˈkʁɪsta ˈpɛfɡn̩]; 16 October 1938 – 18 July 1988), known professionally as Nico, was a German singer, songwriter, actress and model.

Nico had roles in films including Federico Fellini's La Dolce Vita (1960) and Andy Warhol's Chelsea Girls (1966). At the insistence of Warhol, she sang lead on three songs of the Velvet Underground's debut album, The Velvet Underground & Nico (1967). At the same time, she released her debut album, Chelsea Girl (1967), composed of songs written by other musicians. At the suggestion of her friend Jim Morrison, she started writing her own material, using a harmonium, not traditionally a rock instrument. John Cale of the Velvet Underground became her musical arranger and produced The Marble Index (1968), Desertshore (1970), The End... (1974) and other albums.

In the 1980s, Nico toured extensively in Europe, United States, Australia and Japan. After a concert in Berlin in June 1988, she went on holiday in Ibiza, where she died from a cerebral haemorrhage following a cycling accident.

== Early life ==
Nico was born Christa Päffgen on 16 October 1938 in Cologne to Wilhelm and Margarete "Grete" Päffgen (née Schulz, 1910–1970). Wilhelm was born into the wealthy Päffgen Kölsch master brewer family dynasty in Cologne and was Catholic, while Grete came from a lower-class background and was Protestant. Richard Witts notes in his book Nico: The Life and Lies of an Icon that Nico has given differing accounts about her background.

When Nico was two years old, she moved with her mother and grandfather to the Spreewald forest outside Berlin to escape the World War II bombardments of Cologne.

Her father was conscripted into the Wehrmacht at the onset of the war, but there are several conflicting accounts as to when and how he died. According to biographer Richard Witts in his 1995 book Nico: The Life and Lies of an Icon, Wilhelm Päffgen was gravely wounded in 1942 after having been shot in the head by a French sniper. With no certainty that he would survive, his commanding officer, following standing orders, ended Päffgen's life by gunshot. Another story is that he sustained head injuries that caused severe brain damage, and spent the rest of his life in a psychiatric institution. According to unproven rumours, he was variously said to have died in a concentration camp, or to have faded away as a result of shell shock.

In 1946, Nico and her mother relocated to Berlin, where Grete worked as a seamstress. Nico attended school until the age of 13, and began selling lingerie in the exclusive department store KaDeWe, eventually getting modelling jobs in Berlin. At 5 ft 10 in (178 cm), and with chiseled features and pale skin, Nico rose to prominence as a fashion model when still a teenager.

== Career ==
=== Acting and modelling (1955–1964) ===
Nico was discovered at 16 by photographer Herbert Tobias while both were working at a KaDeWe fashion show in Berlin. He gave her the name "Nico" after a man he had fallen in love with, filmmaker Nico Papatakis, and she used it for the rest of her life. She moved to Paris and began working for Vogue, Tempo, Vie Nuove, Mascotte Spettacolo, Camera, Elle, and other fashion magazines. Around this time, she dyed her brown hair blonde, later claiming she was inspired to do so by Ernest Hemingway. At age 17, she was contracted by Coco Chanel to promote their products, but she fled to New York City and abandoned the job. Through her travels, she learned to speak English, Spanish, and French.

In 1959 she had an uncredited speaking part in Mario Lanza's last film For the First Time. In the same year she was invited to the set of Federico Fellini's La Dolce Vita, where she attracted the attention of the acclaimed director, who gave her a minor role in the film as herself. By that time, she was living in New York and taking acting classes with Lee Strasberg.

After a role in the 1961 Jean Paul Belmondo film A Man Named Rocca, she appeared as the cover model on jazz pianist Bill Evans' 1962 album, Moon Beams. After splitting her time between New York and Paris, she got the lead role in Jacques Poitrenaud's Strip-Tease (1963). She recorded the title track, which was written by Serge Gainsbourg but not released until 2001, when it was included in the compilation Le Cinéma de Serge Gainsbourg.

=== Early singing work ===
In New York, Nico first met Greek filmmaker Nico Papatakis, whose name she had adopted as her stage name several years earlier. The two lived together between 1959 and 1961. After noticing her singing around the apartment, Papatakis asked her if she had considered a career in music and enrolled her in her first singing lessons. In 1965, Nico met the Rolling Stones guitarist Brian Jones and recorded her first single, "I'm Not Sayin'", with the B-side "The Last Mile", produced by Jimmy Page for Andrew Loog Oldham's Immediate label.

In a 1965 interview with the British music magazine, Disc Magazine, Nico recalls first meeting Bob Dylan while at a Paris café with actor Ben Carruthers in March 1964. They communicated by telephone throughout the year and she visited him during his 1965 tour of England. Footage of Nico backstage is included in D. A. Pennbaker's documentary 65 Revisited. That same year, she was featured on the music program Ready, Steady, Go! three times and performed Dylan's It Ain't Me Babe on June 11, 1965. In 1967, Nico recorded his song "I'll Keep It with Mine" for her first album, Chelsea Girl.

=== The Velvet Underground (1966–1967) ===
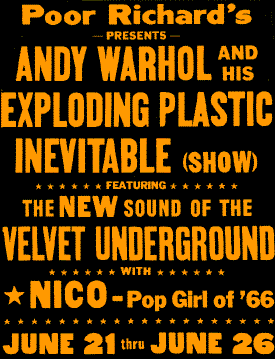
Poster for the Exploding Plastic Inevitable from 1966 advertising Nico

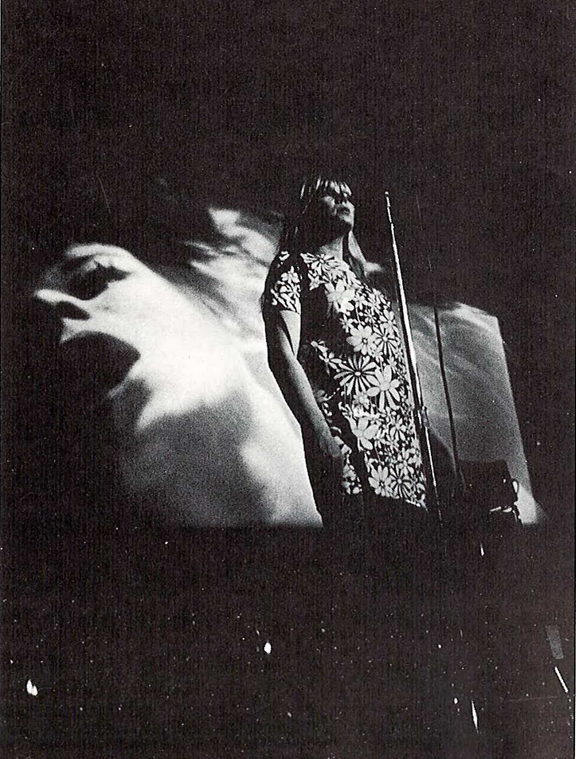
Nico performing with Andy Warhol's Exploding Plastic Inevitable in Ann Arbor, Michigan, 1966

After being introduced by Brian Jones, she began working in New York with Andy Warhol and Paul Morrissey on their experimental films, including Chelsea Girls, The Closet, Sunset and Imitation of Christ. Warhol began managing the Velvet Underground, a New York City rock band and he proposed that the group take on Nico as a "chanteuse", an idea to which they consented, reluctantly for both personal and musical reasons.

The group became the centerpiece of Warhol's Exploding Plastic Inevitable, a multimedia performance featuring music, lighting, film and dance. Nico sang lead vocals on three songs ("Femme Fatale", "All Tomorrow's Parties", "I'll Be Your Mirror"), and backing vocal on "Sunday Morning", on the band's debut album, The Velvet Underground & Nico (1967). Reviewer Richard Goldstein describes Nico as "half goddess, half icicle" and writes that her Velvet Underground vocal "sounds something like a cello getting up in the morning".

Nico's tenure with the Velvet Underground was marked by personal and musical difficulties. Multi-instrumentalist John Cale wrote that Nico's long dressing room preparations, and pre-performance ritual of burning a candle, often held up performances, which especially irritated songwriter Lou Reed. Nico's partial deafness sometimes caused her to veer off key, for which she was ridiculed by other band members. The album became a classic, ranked 13th on Rolling Stone's 500 Greatest Albums of All Time, though it was poorly received at the time of its release.

=== Early solo career (1967–1977) ===
Immediately following her musical work with the Velvet Underground, Nico began work as a solo artist, performing regularly at the Dom in New York City. At these shows, she was accompanied by a revolving cast of guitarists, including members of the Velvet Underground, Tim Hardin, Tim Buckley, Ramblin' Jack Elliott and Jackson Browne.

For her debut album, Chelsea Girl (1967), Nico recorded songs by Bob Dylan, Tim Hardin, and Jackson Browne, among others. The Velvet Underground members Lou Reed, John Cale and Sterling Morrison contributed, with Nico, Reed and Cale co-writing "It Was a Pleasure Then". Chelsea Girl is a traditional chamber-folk album, with strings and flute arrangements added by producer Tom Wilson. Nico had little say in its production, and was disappointed with the result; she said in 1981: "I still cannot listen to it, because everything I wanted for that record, they took it away. I asked for drums, they said no. I asked for more guitars, they said no. And I asked for simplicity, and they covered it in flutes! ... They added strings, and— I didn't like them, but I could live with them. But the flute! The first time I heard the album, I cried and it was all because of the flute."

In California, Nico spent time with Jim Morrison of the Doors, who encouraged her to write her own songs. For The Marble Index, released in 1968, Nico wrote the lyrics and music. Nico's harmonium anchored the accompaniment, and harmonium became her signature instrument for the rest of her career. John Cale arranged the album, adding an array of folk and classical instruments. The album has a European “classical” avant-garde sound, often described as bleak, difficult or frightening. The album also marked a radical change in Nico's appearance and image. She once again dyed her hair, this time from blonde to red, and began dressing mostly in black, a look that would be considered a visual prototype for the gothic rock scene that would emerge in subsequent years.

A promotional film for "Evening of Light" was filmed by Francois de Menil. It featured Nico and Iggy Pop of the Stooges. Returning to live performance in the early 1970s, Nico (accompanying herself on harmonium) performed in Amsterdam and London, where she and Cale opened for Pink Floyd. 1972 saw a reunion of Nico, Cale and Lou Reed at the Bataclan in Paris.

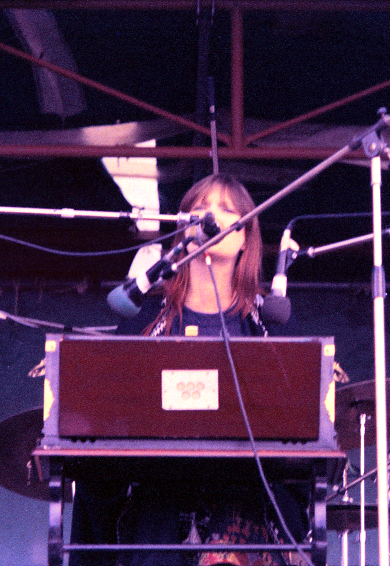
Nico playing harmonium at Free Concert, Hyde Park, 1974

Nico released two more solo albums in the 1970s, Desertshore (1970) and The End... (1974). She wrote the music, sang, and played the harmonium. Cale produced and played most of the other instruments on both albums. The End... featured Brian Eno on synthesizer and Phil Manzanera on guitar, both from Roxy Music. She appeared at the Rainbow Theatre, in London, with Cale, Eno, and Kevin Ayers. The album June 1, 1974 resulted from this concert. Nico performed a version of the Doors' "The End", which was the catalyst for The End... later that year.

Between 1970 and 1979, Nico made about seven films with French director Philippe Garrel. She met Garrel in 1969 and contributed the song "The Falconer" to his film Le Lit de la Vierge. Soon after, she was living with Garrel and became a central figure in his cinematic and personal circles. Nico's first acting appearance with Garrel occurred in his 1972 film, La Cicatrice Intérieure. Nico also supplied the music for this film and collaborated closely with the director. She also appeared in the Garrel films Athanor (1972); the silent Jean Seberg feature Les Hautes Solitudes, released in 1974; Un ange passe (1975); Le Berceau de cristal (1976), starring Pierre Clémenti, Nico and Anita Pallenberg; and Voyage au jardin des morts (1978). His 1991 film J'entends Plus la Guitare is dedicated to Nico.

On 13 December 1974, Nico opened for Tangerine Dream's concert at Reims Cathedral in Reims, France. Around this time, Nico became involved with Berliner musician Lutz Ulbrich, guitarist for Ash Ra Tempel. Ulbrich would accompany Nico on guitar at many of her subsequent concerts through the rest of the decade. Also in this time period, Nico let her hair return to its natural brown color but continued wearing mostly black. This would be her public image from then on. Nico and Island Records allegedly had many disputes during this time, and in 1975 Island dropped her from their roster.

=== Later solo career (1978–1983) ===
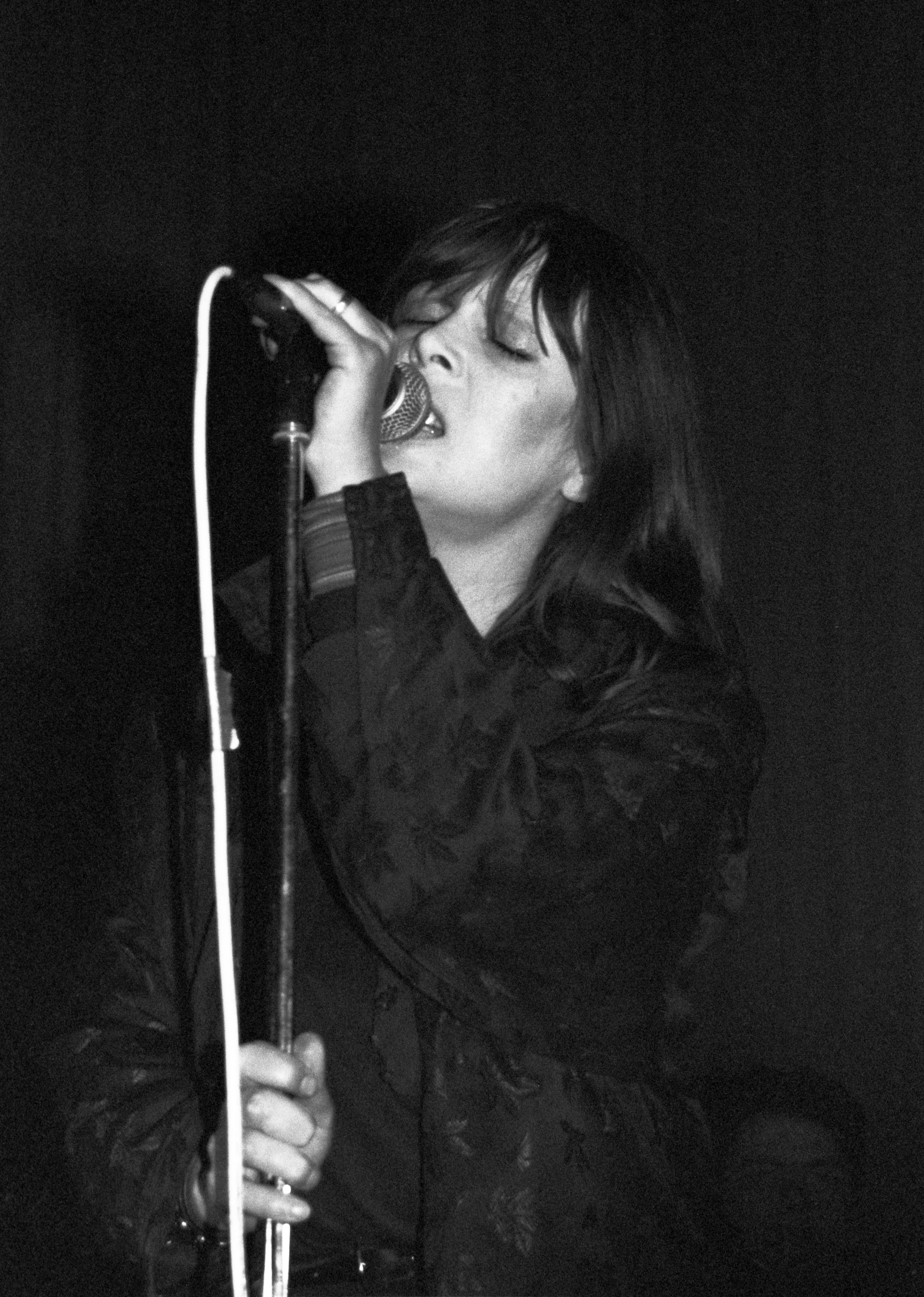
Nico performing at Lampeter University in 1985

In September 1978, Nico performed at the Canet Roc '78 festival in Spain. Also performing at this event were Blondie, Kevin Ayers, and Ultravox. She made a vocal contribution to Neuronium's second album, Vuelo Químico, as she was at the studio, by chance, while it was being recorded in Barcelona in 1978 by Michel Huygen, Carlos Guirao and Albert Gimenez. She read excerpts from "Ulalume" by Edgar Allan Poe. She said that the music deeply moved her, so she could not help but make a contribution. During the same year, Nico briefly toured as supporting act for Siouxsie and the Banshees, one of many post-punk bands who namechecked her. In Paris, Patti Smith bought a new harmonium for Nico after her original was stolen.

Nico returned to New York in 1979 where her comeback concert at CBGB (accompanied by John Cale and Lutz Ulbrich) was reviewed positively in The New York Times. She began playing regularly at the Squat Theatre and other venues with Jim Tisdall accompanying her on harp and Gittler guitar. They played together on a sold-out tour of twelve cities in the East and Midwest. At some shows, she was accompanied on guitar by Cheetah Chrome (the Dead Boys).

In France, Nico was introduced to photographer Antoine Giacomoni. Giacomoni's photos of Nico would be used for her next album, and would eventually be featured in a book (Nico: Photographies, Horizon Illimite, Paris, 2002). Through Antoine Giacomoni, she met Corsican bassist Philippe Quilichini. Nico recorded her next studio album, Drama of Exile, in 1981. produced by Philippe Quilichini. Mahamad Hadi aka Mad Sheer Khan played oriental rock guitar and wrote all the oriental production. It was a departure from her earlier work with John Cale, featuring a mixture of rock and Middle Eastern arrangements. For this album, in addition to originals like "Genghis Khan" and "Sixty Forty", Nico recorded covers of the Velvet Underground's "I'm Waiting for the Man" and David Bowie's "'Heroes'". Drama of Exile was released twice, in two different versions, the second in 1983.

=== Camera Obscura and final years (1980s) ===
After relocating to Hulme Crescents in Manchester, England, in the early 1980s, Nico hired a manager, the Factory Records executive and promoter Alan Wise, and began working with a variety of backing bands for her many live performances. These bands chronologically included Blue Orchids, the Bedlamites and the Faction. In 1981, Nico released the Philippe Quilichini-produced single "Saeta"/"Vegas" on Flicknife Records. The following year saw another single, "Procession", produced by Martin Hannett and featuring the Invisible Girls. Included on the "Procession" single was a new version of the Velvet Underground's "All Tomorrow's Parties".

Nico toured in 1982 with post-punk band Blue Orchids as her backing band. At the time, her work impacted the emerging gothic rock scene. At Salford University in 1982, she joined Bauhaus for a performance of "I'm Waiting for the Man". That same year, Nico's supporting acts included the Sisters of Mercy and Gene Loves Jezebel. In September 1982, Nico performed at the Deeside Leisure Centre for the Futurama Festival. The line-up for this show also included the Damned, Dead or Alive, Southern Death Cult, Danse Society and the Membranes. After the end of her work with the Blue Orchids, she hired musical arranger James Young and his band the Faction for her concerts. The live compilations 1982 Tour Diary and En Personne En Europe were released in November 1982 on the 1/2 Records cassette label in France; the ROIR cassette label reissued the former under the revised title "Do Or Die!" in 1983. These releases were followed by more live performances throughout Europe over the next few years.

She recorded her final solo album, Camera Obscura, in 1985, with the Faction (James Young and Graham "Dids" Dowdall). Produced by John Cale, it featured Nico's version of the Richard Rodgers/Lorenz Hart song "My Funny Valentine". The album's closing song was an updated version of "König", which she had previously recorded for La cicatrice interieure. This was the only song on the album to feature only Nico's voice and harmonium. A music video for "My Heart Is Empty" was filmed at The Fridge in Brixton.

In the following years, Nico toured Europe, Japan and Australia (usually with the Faction or the Bedlamites). A number of Nico's performances towards the end of her life were recorded and released, including 1982's Heroine, Nico in Tokyo, and Behind the Iron Curtain. In March 1988, she and Young hired the guitarist Henry Olsen: together, they composed new songs to be premiered at a festival organized by Lutz Ulbrich at the Berlin Planetarium in June. Nico was inspired by Egyptian music and Egyptian singer and diva Oum Kalthoum. Young stated that the new material was "good enough to be a springboard to a new record" with an Egyptian orchestra. The Berlin concert ended with a song from The End..., "You Forget to Answer".

A duet called "Your Kisses Burn" with singer Marc Almond was her last studio recording (about a month before her death). It was released a few months after her death on Almond's album The Stars We Are. The recording of the 1988 Berlin concert, was later released with the title Nico's Last Concert: Fata Morgana.

== Personal life ==
In 1959, Nico was supposed to play the lead female role in the French movie Purple Noon. Due to a scheduling mix-up, she arrived on set after filming had already begun, and her role had already been given to Marie Laforêt. During filming, she had an affair with French actor Alain Delon, who was at the time in a relationship with actress Romy Schneider. In late 1961, Alain Delon and Nico met again in New York. They resumed their affair, which resulted in a pregnancy. As soon as she learned of her pregnancy, Nico told those around her that the child was Alain Delon's. According to Nico and Edith Boulogne, Alain Delon's mother, he went from anger to outright denial. He told his mother, she claimed, "that Bosch is responsible; she's the guilty one" and refused to take any responsibility. On 11 August 1962, she gave birth to their son, Christian Aaron Boulogne, whom she called Ari. Unable to raise her child, she left Ari to be raised by Delon's mother and stepfather. Ari became a photographer and actor. He died of a heroin overdose, aged 60, in Paris in 2023 and until the end, he fought to be legally recognized by Alain Delon.

Nico saw herself as part of a tradition of bohemian artists, which she traced back to the Romanticism of the early 19th century. She led a nomadic life, living in different countries. Apart from Germany, where she grew up, and Spain, where she died, Nico lived in Italy and France in the 1950s, spent most of the 1960s in the US, and lived in London in the early 1960s and again in the 1980s, when she moved between London and Manchester. In 1965, Nico became pregnant during a three-month affair with Brian Jones and had an abortion. The event prompted her to seek a closer relationship with her son Ari.

Nico was a heroin addict for over 15 years. In the book Songs They Never Play on the Radio, James Young, a member of her band in the 1980s, recalls many examples of her troubling behaviour due to her "overwhelming" addiction – and that Nico claimed never to have taken the drug while in the Velvets/Factory scene but only began using during her relationship with French film director Philippe Garrel in the 1970s.

Nico spent most of the final years of her life in the Prestwich and Salford areas of Greater Manchester. Although she was still struggling with addiction, she became interested in music again. For a few months in the 1980s, she shared an apartment in Brixton, London, with the punk poet John Cooper Clarke but not as a couple. In his autobiography, musician Cheetah Chrome depicted his friendship with a strung-out Nico in the 1980s and their mutual dependence. Shortly before her death, Nico stopped using heroin and began methadone replacement therapy as well as a regimen of bicycle exercise and healthy eating.

=== Views ===
Nico's friend Danny Fields, the American journalist who helped her sign to Elektra Records, described her as "Nazi-esque", saying, "Every once in a while there'd be something about Jews and I'd be, 'But Nico, I'm Jewish,' and she was like 'Yes, yes, I don't mean you.'" According to Fields, in the early 1970s, Nico attacked a mixed-race woman at the Chelsea Hotel with a smashed wine glass, sticking it in her eye while saying, "I hate black people." Island Records dropped Nico after she told an interviewer that she did not like "Negroes" and that they had "features like animals". Nico said she had been raped at the age of thirteen by a black American soldier who had been court-martialed and executed; the biographer Richard Witts could find no record of this, even when similar incidents were "assiduously documented." The biographer Jennifer Otter Bickerdike claims that "personal documents" have been uncovered that support the story but does not supply details or proof. According to Witts, Nico had misogynistic tendencies, describing women as poison. She called herself "a Nazi anarchist junkie".

In 2019, Nigel Bagley, Nico's co-manager and promoter in Manchester, said he never saw Nico express racist views and said she lived in a multicultural city and was friendly with their American-Jamaican doorman. Her drummer, Graham Dowdall, noted that Nico had used Indian instruments and worked with north Africans. He said she was "certainly capable of very casual racism" about her promoter, Alan Wise, who was Jewish, but that this was her way of "having a go" at him.

== Death and funeral ==
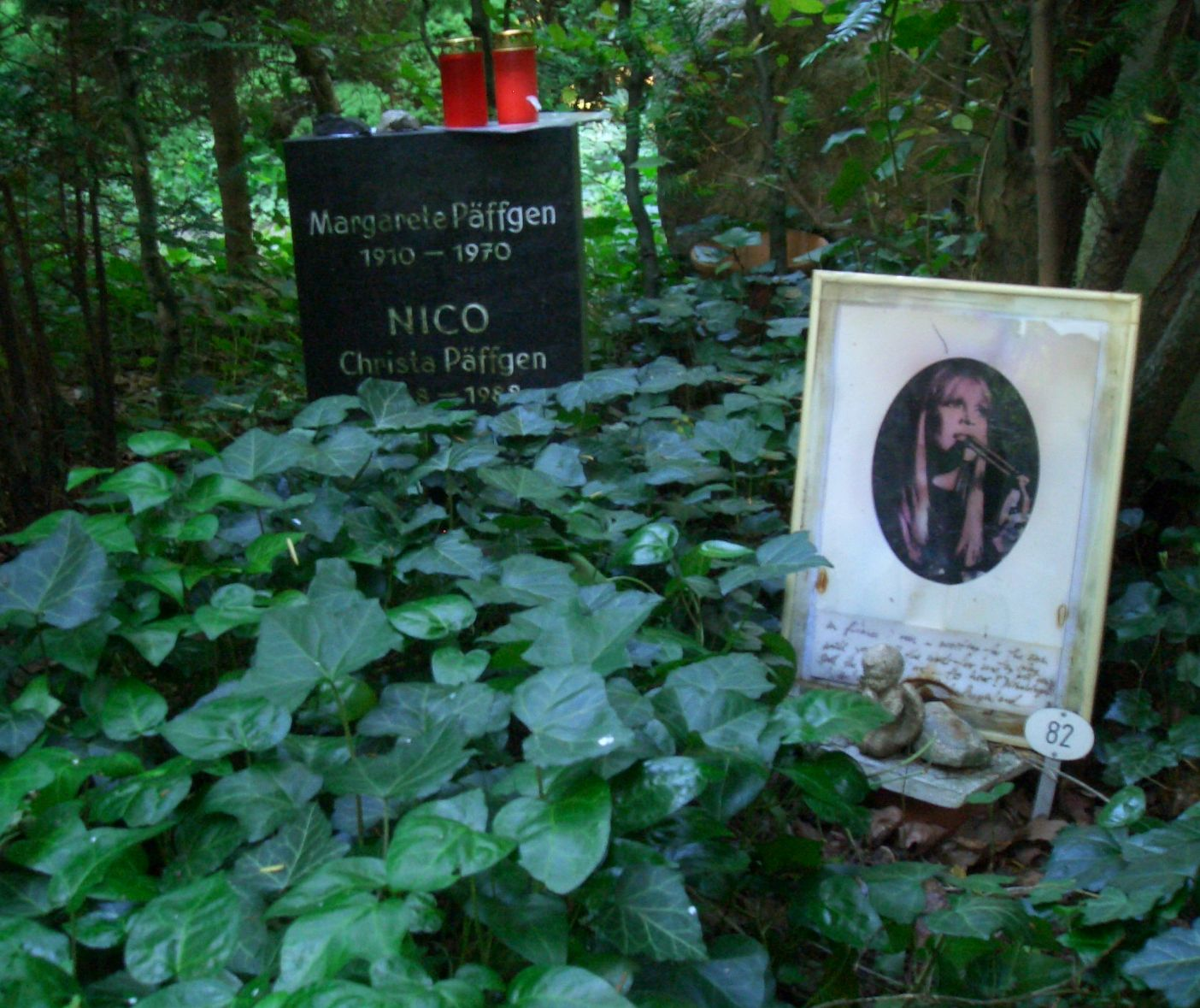
Nico's grave in Berlin

On 18 July 1988, during a holiday with Ari on the Spanish island of Ibiza, Nico hit her head when she fell off her bicycle. A passing taxi driver found her unconscious, but had difficulty getting her admitted to local hospitals. She was misdiagnosed as suffering from heat exposure and was declared dead at 20:00. X-rays later revealed a severe cerebral hemorrhage as the cause of death. Her son later said of the incident:

In the late morning of July 17, 1988, my mother told me she needed to go downtown to buy marijuana. She sat down in front of the mirror and wrapped a black scarf around her head. My mother stared at the mirror and took great care to wrap the scarf appropriately. Down the hill on her bike: "I'll be back soon." She left in the early afternoon on the hottest day of the year.

Nico's cremated remains are buried in her mother's plot in Grunewald, a forest cemetery in Berlin. Friends played a tape of "Mütterlein", a song from Desertshore, at her funeral.

== Legacy ==
Nico directly inspired many musicians, including Siouxsie and the Banshees, the Cure, Morrissey, Elliott Smith, and Björk. Siouxsie and the Banshees invited her as special guest on their first major UK tour in 1978; they also later covered "All Tomorrow's Parties". The Cure's leader Robert Smith has cited Desertshore as one of his favourite records, as has Björk. Joy Division and New Order's Peter Hook cited Chelsea Girl as one of his favourite albums. Bauhaus singer, Peter Murphy, considered that "Nico recorded the first truly Gothic album, Marble lndex or The End. Nico was Gothic, but she was Mary Shelley to everyone else's Hammer Horror. They both did Frankenstein, but Nico's was real." Morrissey cited Nico when asked to name artists who had a lasting influence on him: "The royal three remain the same: the New York Dolls, Frank Sinatra, Elvis Presley, with Nico standing firm as first reserve." Morrissey also said of the song "Innocent and Vain", "This is my youth in one piece of music." Elliott Smith covered "Chelsea Girls" and "These Days" in Portland, Oregon in October 1999; he also cited The Marble Index as one of his perfect 2.45am albums. Marc Almond recorded a cover version of "The Falconer": she was one of the "things I was obsessed about at school" due to her "wonderful intriguing voice, icy and remote yet warm at the same time." Marianne Faithfull recorded "Song For Nico" on her LP Kissin' Time in 2002. Michael Gira also recorded an homonymous song for the Angels of Light album How I Loved You, and cited Desertshore and The Marble Index among his favorite albums. Patti Smith did a concert tribute to Nico in 2014 in which she covered "I Will Be Seven". Low wrote a song titled "Those Girls (Song For Nico)" and Neko Case covered "Afraid" in 2013.

Two of Nico's songs from Chelsea Girl, "The Fairest of the Seasons" and "These Days", both written by Jackson Browne, were featured in Wes Anderson's film The Royal Tenenbaums.

Several biographical works on Nico have appeared, both in print and film. The first, in 1992, was Songs They Never Play on the Radio, a book by James Young that draws on his association with Nico in her last years. In 1993, Nico: The Life and Lies of an Icon by musicologist Richard Witts covered Nico's entire life and career. The 1995 documentary Nico Icon by Susanne Ofteringer examined the many facets of Nico's life with contributions from people who knew her, including her colleagues Reed and Cale. In 2015, Lutz Graf-Ulbrich, Nico's former partner and accompanist in the late 1970s, published Nico: In the Shadow of the Moon Goddess, an account of his time with Nico. In the 2018 biopic Nico, 1988 directed by Susanna Nicchiarelli, Trine Dyrholm portrays Nico on a journey across Europe during her last tour.

In 2019, Manchester International Festival put on a production called The Nico Project. It was a theatrical re-telling of Nico's 1968 album The Marble Index starring Maxine Peake.

=== Tributes ===
Several concerts to honour Nico's career were organized over the years with multiple singers revisiting her repertoire. In 1981 Texas punk band Really Red released an original song in tribute to Nico. In 2005, alternative rock band Anberlin released their second studio album, Never Take Friendship Personal, which includes the song "Dance, Dance Christa Päffgen", inspired by Nico, whose given name was Christa Päffgen. The song references her struggle with drugs and unrelated death. Two Nico tribute concerts took place in Europe in the autumn of 2008 to commemorate the 70th anniversary of Nico's birth and the 20th anniversary of her death. On 11 October 2008, John Cale, James Dean Bradfield (of Manic Street Preachers), Fyfe Dangerfield of the Guillemots, Mark Linkous (of Sparklehorse), Peter Murphy (of Bauhaus), Lisa Gerrard of Dead Can Dance, and Mark Lanegan appeared on stage at the Royal Festival Hall in London. On 17 October 2008 at the Volksbuehne in Berlin, Nico's ex-boyfriend Lutz Ulbrich, who was her musical collaborator in the late 1970s, presented another tribute concert, which featured Marianne Rosenberg, Soap&Skin, Marianne Enzensberger, and James Young, the keyboardist from The Faction, Nico's last band.

Shearwater's 2006 album Palo Santo was dedicated to Nico, and was loosely based on her life.

Performance artist Tammy Faye Starlite (Tammy Lang) enjoyed success in 2011 with her one-woman show Nico: Chelsea Mädchen, in which she impersonated the singer and delivered spoken material based on an interview Nico gave in the mid-Eighties, during an Australian tour.

In 2012, X-TG (featuring members of industrial band Throbbing Gristle) released a re-interpretation of the Desertshore album.

In January 2013, John Cale organized a tribute A Life Along the Borderline at the Brooklyn Academy of Music in New York City. Performers included Cale, Kim Gordon with Bill Nace, Sharon Van Etten, Meshell Ndegeocello, Stephin Merritt, Peaches, Alison Mosshart, Joan As Police Woman, Greg Dulli, Yeasayer, and Mercury Rev.

The song "Last Ride" on Beach House's 2018 album 7 "was inspired by" Nico, according to lead singer Victoria Legrand.

== Discography ==
According to The Great Rock Discography:

=== Studio albums ===
Year	Title
1967	The Velvet Underground & Nico (US No. 129, UK No. 59, IRL No. 56, ITA No. 76)
1967	Chelsea Girl
1968	The Marble Index
1970	Desertshore
1974	The End...
1981	Drama of Exile
1985	Camera Obscura

=== EPs ===
Year	Title
1977	The Peel Sessions (Recorded 1971 and 1974)

=== Live albums ===
Year	Title
1972	Le Bataclan '72 (Together with John Cale and Lou Reed)
1974	June 1, 1974
1982	Do or Die: Nico in Europe (Live recordings from 1982 European tour)
1983	Live in Denmark (tracks 01-09 recorded live 1982-10-06, at the Club Paramount, Eriksvej 40, Roskilde, Denmark)
1985	Nico Live in Pécs
1986	Behind the Iron Curtain
1989	Nico in Tokyo (tracks 01-11 recorded live 11 April 1986, Tokyo)
1990	Hanging Gardens
1992	Chelsea Girl / Live (recorded live June 1985, Chelsea Town Hall)
1994	Heroine
2022	Live at the Hacienda '83 (recorded live in Manchester, 24 February 1983)

=== Compilation albums ===
Year	Title
1984	Live Heroes
1998	Nico: The Classic Years
2003	Femme Fatale – The Aura Anthology. (Re-issue of Drama of Exile with bonus tracks plus Live at Chelsea Town Hall 9.8.85.)
2007	The Frozen Borderline – 1968–1970. (The Marble Index and Desertshore re-issued with bonus tracks.)

=== Unofficial releases ===
In 2002, Faust Records released two collections of obscure Nico tracks, Reich der Träume (Realm of Dreams) and Walpurgis-Nacht (Walpurgis Night).

=== Singles ===
Year	Title
1965	"I'm Not Sayin'" / "The Last Mile"
1981	"Saeta" / "Vegas" – Flicknife Records FLS 206
1982	"Procession" / "All Tomorrow's Parties" (Recorded with the Invisible Girls & Martin Hannett)
1983	"Heroes" / "One More Chance"
1985	"My Funny Valentine" / "My Heart Is Empty"

== Bibliography ==
- Nico: The Life and Lies of an Icon by Richard Witts (Virgin Books: London, 1992).
- Up-tight: the Velvet Underground Story by Victor Bockris and Gerard Malanga (Omnibus Press: London, 1995 reprint).
- Songs They Never Play on the Radio: Nico, the Last Bohemian by James Young, Bloomsbury, London 1992 ISBN 0-7475-1194-2
- Nico: Photographies by Antoine Giacomoni, (Dragoon: Paris, 2002).
- Nico: Cible mouvante. Chansons, Poèmes, Journal by Nico, Jacques Pauvert and Ari Boulogne, (Pauvert: Paris, 2001).
- L'amour n'oublie jamais by Ari Boulogne, (Pauvert: Paris, 2001).
- Please Kill Me: The Uncensored Oral History of Punk by Legs McNeil and Gillian Mccain, (Grove Press: New York, 1996).
- Lüül: Ein Musikerleben zwischen Agitation Free, Ashra, Nico, der Neuen Deutschen Welle und den 17 Hippies by Lutz Ulbrich (Schwarzkopf & Schwarzkopf: Berlin, 2007).
- Nico - In The Shadow of the Moon Goddess by Lutz Graf-Ulbrich (E-book, Amazon Digital Services, 2015).
- You Are Beautiful and You Are Alone: The Biography of Nico, by Jennifer Otter Bickerdike, Faber (2021), ISBN 978-0-571-35001-8.

== Films and plays ==
- Nico – In Memoriam (1988), documentary directed by Bernd Gaul
- Nico Icon (1995), documentary directed by Susanne Ofteringer
- Nico Icon Play, play by Stella Grundy, premièred at Studio Salford on 5 September 2007
- Nico. Sphinx aus Eis (2005), by Werner Fritsch
- Nico, 1988 (2018), directed by Susanna Nicchiarelli with actress Trine Dyrholm as Nico.
- The Nico Project (2019), co-created by Sarah Frankcom (director) and Maxine Peake (performer), performed at Manchester International Festival 2019.
