= Nico's Last Concert: Fata Morgana =

Live album by Nico
- Released: February 22, 1994
- Recorded: June 6, 1988
- Venue: Planetarium of the Wilhelm-Foerster-Sternwarte, West Berlin
- Genre: Experimental
- Label: Steamhammer/SPV
- Producer: Lütz Ulbrich

Nico chronology
Live Heroes (1986)	Nico's Last Concert: Fata Morgana (1994)	Reich der Träume (2002)

Nico's Last Concert: Fata Morgana is a live album by Nico, released on 22 February 1994. It documents her performance at a show called Fata Morgana – Wüstenklänge im Planetarium (Fata Morgana – Desert Sounds in the Planetarium), held on June 6, 1988 in West Berlin as part of the European Capital of Culture festival that year. The concert (organized by musician Lütz Ulbrich) took place at the planetarium of the Wilhelm-Foerster-Sternwarte. Except for the album's closing song (which was previously released on The End...), Nico and her backing band the Faction composed all the pieces specifically for the show, during which they were accompanied by optical effects and Moon-themed projected pictures and films.

The concert was Nico's last, and the material on the album is among the last she wrote. Six weeks later, on July 18, she died while on vacation in Ibiza.

== Track listing ==
All tracks are written by Nico, James Young, Graham Dowdall and Henry Olsen, except where noted.

No.	Title	Writer(s)	Length
1.	"The Sound I"		10:42
2.	"The Hanging Gardens of Semiramis"		9:17
3.	"Your Voice"		7:17
4.	"I Will Be Seven"	Nico	6:41
5.	"Fata Morgana"		6:49
6.	"All Saints' Night"	Nico	6:23
7.	"The Sound II"		6:17
8.	"You Forget to Answer"	Nico	3:57

== Personnel ==
- Nico – vocal, Indian pump organ

The Faction

- James Young – piano, synthesiser
- Henry Olsen – guitar
- Graham "Dids" Dowdall – drums, percussion

Technical

- Robert Sydow – engineer
- Otto Schönthaler – mixing engineer
