= Reich der Träume =

Reich Der Träume

Compilation album by Nico
- Released: 2002
- Genre: Avant-garde, art rock
- Length: 79:40
- Label: Faust

Nico chronology
Nico's Last Concert: Fata Morgana (1994)	Reich Der Träume (2002)	Le Bataclan '72 (2004)

Professional ratings
Review scores
Source	Rating
AllMusic	3.5/5 stars

Reich der Träume (German, "Realm of Dreams") is an unofficial compilation release of rare Nico tracks. It was released by Faust Records in 2002 and includes several live tracks and demos recorded throughout the 1980s. A second compilation by Faust, Walpurgis-Nacht (German, "Walpurgis Night"), was released shortly after that same year.

== Track listing ==
All tracks are written by Nico, except where noted.

No.	Title	Writer(s)	Length
1.	"Reich der Träume (Land of Dreams)" (Remixed Trance Version)	Lütz Ulbrich	8:14
2.	"All Tomorrow's Parties" (Band Version With The Invisible Girls)	Lou Reed	5:28
3.	"Lied vom Einsamen Mädchen" (Live In Tokyo 11.4.1986)	Robert Gilbert, Werner R. Heymann	6:28
4.	"Femme Fatale" (Live In Tokyo 11.4.1986)	Reed	4:02
5.	"60/40" (Live In Tokyo 11.4.1986)		6:38
6.	"My Funny Valentine" (Live In Tokyo 11.4.1986)	Richard Rodgers, Lorenz Hart	4:01
7.	"Win a Few" (Live In Budapest 25.10.1985)		8:47
8.	"Saeta" (Live In Rotterdam 1982)		4:21
9.	"Fearfully in Danger" (Live Library Theatre Manchester 1980)		3:49
10.	"We've Got the Gold" (Live Library Theatre Manchester 1980)		4:05
11.	"Mütterlein" (Live Library Theatre Manchester 1980)		4:13
12.	"Afraid" (Live Library Theatre Manchester 1980)		3:35
13.	"Your Voice" (Studio Demo For The Proposed Follow-Up To Camera Obscura)		5:41
14.	"The Sound" (Studio Demo For The Proposed Follow-Up To Camera Obscura)		4:51
15.	"Orly Flight" (Live In Utrecht 1983)		3:20
16.	"Saeta" (John Peel Session September 1981)		2:07
Total length:			79:40
