= Behind the Iron Curtain (album) =

Live album by Nico
- Released: 1986
- Recorded: Rotterdam, 9 October 1985
- Venue: De Doelen Concertgebouw, Grote Zaal (Rotterdam)
- Genre: Rock
- Label: Dojo

Nico chronology
Camera Obscura (1985)	Behind the Iron Curtain (1986)	Live Heroes (1986)

Professional ratings
Review scores
Source	Rating
AllMusic	4/5 stars

Behind the Iron Curtain is a live album released by German singer Nico in 1986. It features a concert recorded at De Doelen Concertgebouw, Grote Zaal (Great Hall), in Rotterdam, Netherlands on 9 October 1985. The concert was held as part of the Pandora's Music Box music festival.

Although the release states it was "recorded live in Warsaw, Budapest and Prague between 29.9.85 and 31.10.85"—thus behind the Iron Curtain—it was in fact entirely recorded at the one concert in Rotterdam. The album was released on CD in 1987 excluding the material from side three.

== Track listing ==
All songs are written by Nico, except where noted.

Side one
No.	Title	Writer(s)	Length
1.	"All Saints' Night"	Nico, Eric Random, Toby Toman, James Young	9:14
2.	"Procession"		3:48
3.	"Secret Side"		3:33
4.	"Das Lied vom einsamen Mädchen"	Robert Gilbert, Werner R. Heymann	6:08

Side two
No.	Title	Writer(s)	Length
5.	"Win a Few"		8:55
6.	"König"		4:27
7.	"Purple Lips"		4:32
8.	"All Tomorrow's Parties"	Lou Reed	3:03

Side three
No.	Title	Writer(s)	Length
9.	"Fearfully in Danger"		6:49
10.	"The End"	The Doors	10:10
11.	"My Funny Valentine"	Richard Rodgers, Lorenz Hart	4:15
12.	"Sixty/Forty"		2:26

Side four
No.	Title	Writer(s)	Length
13.	"Tananore"		4:06
14.	"Janitor of Lunacy"		4:19
15.	"My Heart Is Empty"		5:15
16.	"Femme Fatale"	Reed	3:48

== Personnel ==
- Nico – vocals, Indian pump organ
- James Young – piano, keyboards
- Eric Random – tabla, percussion, synthesiser
- Graham 'Dids' Dowdall – electronic percussion
- Toby Toman – drums
- Michael Ward – sound engineer
