= Do or Die: Diary 1982 =

- 2000 CD release cover

Live album by Nico
- Released: November 1982 (cassette); March 30, 2000 (compact disc)
- Recorded: Europe, January–March 1982
- Genre: Rock
- Label: ROIR
- Producer: Phil Rainford

Nico chronology
| Drama of Exile (1981) | Do or Die: Diary 1982 (1982) | The Drama of Exile (1983) |

Do or Die: Diary 1982 is a live album by Nico, released in November 1982. The album chronicles her European tour from January 18 to March 28, 1982. It features songs from Nico's albums The Marble Index, Desertshore, The End... and Drama of Exile, which include covers of the Velvet Underground, David Bowie and the Doors.

It was originally released on cassette in November 1982 by 1/2 Records under the title 1982 Diary (as a matched set with the cassette En Personne En Europe – later reissued on CD as Femme Fatale by Jungle Records) and later reissued under a handful of different titles, including Nico Sings the Void. It was released on compact disc by Danceteria in 1987 under the title Do or Die (using the ROIR reissue title) and later reissued by ROIR US with a different cover on March 30, 2000.

== Reception ==
Professional ratings
Review scores
| Source | Rating |
|---|---|
| AllMusic | 3/5 stars |
| Exclaim.ca | ambiguous |

AllMusic called Do or Die one of the "finest" documents of a Nico live concert, noting that the songs "are drawn from almost every phase of her career, essentially lining up as the definitive 'greatest hits' album Nico is still awaiting."

== Track listing ==
All tracks are written by Nico, except where noted.

| No. | Title | Writer(s) | Length |
|---|---|---|---|
| 1. | "Janitor of Lunacy" | | 4:02 |
| 2. | "All Tomorrow's Parties" | Lou Reed | 4:44 |
| 3. | "Sãeta" | Nico, Quilichini | 4:19 |
| 4. | "Sãeta" | Nico, Quilichini | 2:56 |
| 5. | "Vegas" | | 3:13 |
| 6. | "No One Is There" | | 4;02 |
| 7. | "Innocent and Vain" | | 2:23 |
| 8. | "Secret Side" | | 3:43 |
| 9. | "Procession" | | 3:06 |
| 10. | "Heroes" | David Bowie, Brian Eno | 5:52 |
| 11. | "Femme Fatale" | Reed | 3:03 |
| 12. | "All Tomorrow's Parties" | Reed | 2:43 |
| 13. | "I'm Waiting for the Man" | Reed | 6:30 |
| 14. | "The End" | Jim Morrison, Robby Krieger, Ray Manzarek, John Densmore | 8:13 |

Notes:

- Tracks 1, 2 and 13 recorded at Teatro Nuova Medica, Bologna, Italy on March 28, 1982.
- Track 3, 5 recorded at Lantaren/Venster, Rotterdam, Netherlands on March 7, 1982.
- Track 4 recorded at a Piccadilly Radio session in Manchester, England in January 1982.
- Tracks 6, 8, 12 and 14 recorded at Saltlageret, Copenhagen, Denmark on February 14, 1982.
- Tracks 7, 9 and 11 recorded at The Venue, London, England on January 18, 1982.
- Track 10 recorded at Theater de Meervaart, Amsterdam, Netherlands on March 6, 1982.
- Tracks 5 and 10 are in mono, and other tracks in stereo.

== Personnel ==
- Nico – vocal, harmonium
- Samarkand:
  - Mahamad Hadi – 1/4 tone synth guitar, dilruba
  - Vasken Solakian – kemantche, tar
- Blue Orchids:
  - Martin Bramah – guitar, backing vocals
  - Rick Goldstraw – guitar
  - Una Baines – keyboards
  - Steve Garvey – bass, backing vocals
  - Toby Toman – drums

Produced and engineered by Phil Rainford
Mastered by Dave Greatbanks
Compiled by Nigel Bagley
Digitally remastered by Pomeroy Audio (January 2000)
