= Danny Fields =

American music manager

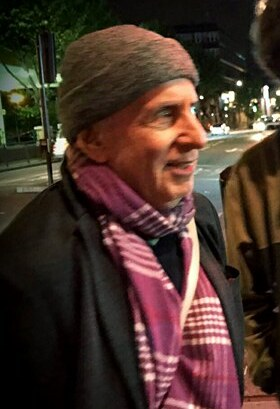
- Fields in 2017
- Born: Daniel Feinberg; November 13, 1939 (age 86)
- Education: University of Pennsylvania; Harvard Law School
- Occupations: Music manager; publicist; journalist; author

Danny Fields (born Daniel Feinberg; November 13, 1939) is an American music manager, publicist, journalist, and author. As a music industry executive from the 1960s to the 1980s, he was one of the most influential figures in the history of punk rock. He signed and managed Iggy and the Stooges, signed the MC5 and managed the Ramones, and worked in various roles with Jim Morrison, the Velvet Underground and the Modern Lovers. In 2014 The New York Times said, "You could make a convincing case that without Danny Fields, punk rock would not have happened."

== Early life ==
Fields was born to a Jewish family and grew up in Richmond Hill, Queens. After graduating Phi Beta Kappa from the University of Pennsylvania in 1959, he attended Harvard Law School, but left during his first year. He moved to Manhattan's Greenwich Village in 1960, briefly enrolled at New York University, and became involved with the burgeoning downtown arts and music scene.

== Career ==
After stints at publications such as Liquor Store and Outdoor Advertiser, Fields got a job at the teen-fan magazine Datebook. In 1966, as Managing Editor, he was responsible for shining a spotlight on John Lennon's "more popular than Jesus" quote.

In the 1960s, Fields began frequenting Max's Kansas City. It was there that he developed connections to Andy Warhol's Factory social circle. Fields occasionally shared his loft with Warhol actress Edie Sedgwick, and wrote an account of the Warhol-sponsored Velvet Underground during their early years. He later penned the liner notes for the band's album Live at Max's Kansas City, recorded in 1970, but released in 1972, after the band broke up.

Fields hosted a radio show on New Jersey's WFMU during its groundbreaking 1968–1969 free-form years, and he was hired by Elektra Records as a publicist. Elektra, which had primarily been a folk music label, was having huge success in the rock record market with The Doors, and hired Fields to publicize the band, despite (discussed by Fields in numerous interviews) that he and lead singer Jim Morrison disliked each other. Despite this mutual antagonism, Fields got Morrison on many key teen magazine covers in 1968. In September 1968, Fields visited Detroit and Ann Arbor on the recommendation of two fellow DJs at WFMU (Bob Rudnick and Dennis Frawley). He recommended to Elektra that the label sign the MC5 and The Stooges. Both bands served as major inspirations for the US and UK punk music movements of the mid-to-late 1970s. Danny was also instrumental in getting the New York street musician, David Peel, released on Elektra in 1968.

In 1975, Fields discovered the Ramones at CBGB, and helped get them signed to Sire Records. Around this time, Fields was writing a regular column in the SoHo Weekly News. As the band's co-manager, with Linda Stein, Fields brought the band to England, where they had an enormous impact, inspiring the nascent UK punk movement, including such bands as the Sex Pistols, The Clash and The Damned. Under Fields' management the Ramones recorded Ramones, Leave Home, and Rocket to Russia. The 1980 Ramones album End of the Century includes the track "Danny Says", about Fields. The song has been covered by the Foo Fighters and Tom Waits.

In 1990, Fields discovered singer-songwriter Paleface at a performance in New York's Chameleon club and became his manager: he helped the young artist get signed to Polygram Records and Elektra Records.

After leaving the music business, Fields co-authored Dream On, the biography of Warhol actress Cyrinda Foxe, the wife of Aerosmith lead singer Steven Tyler. He subsequently wrote Linda McCartney: A Portrait, which was turned into a television miniseries by CBS.

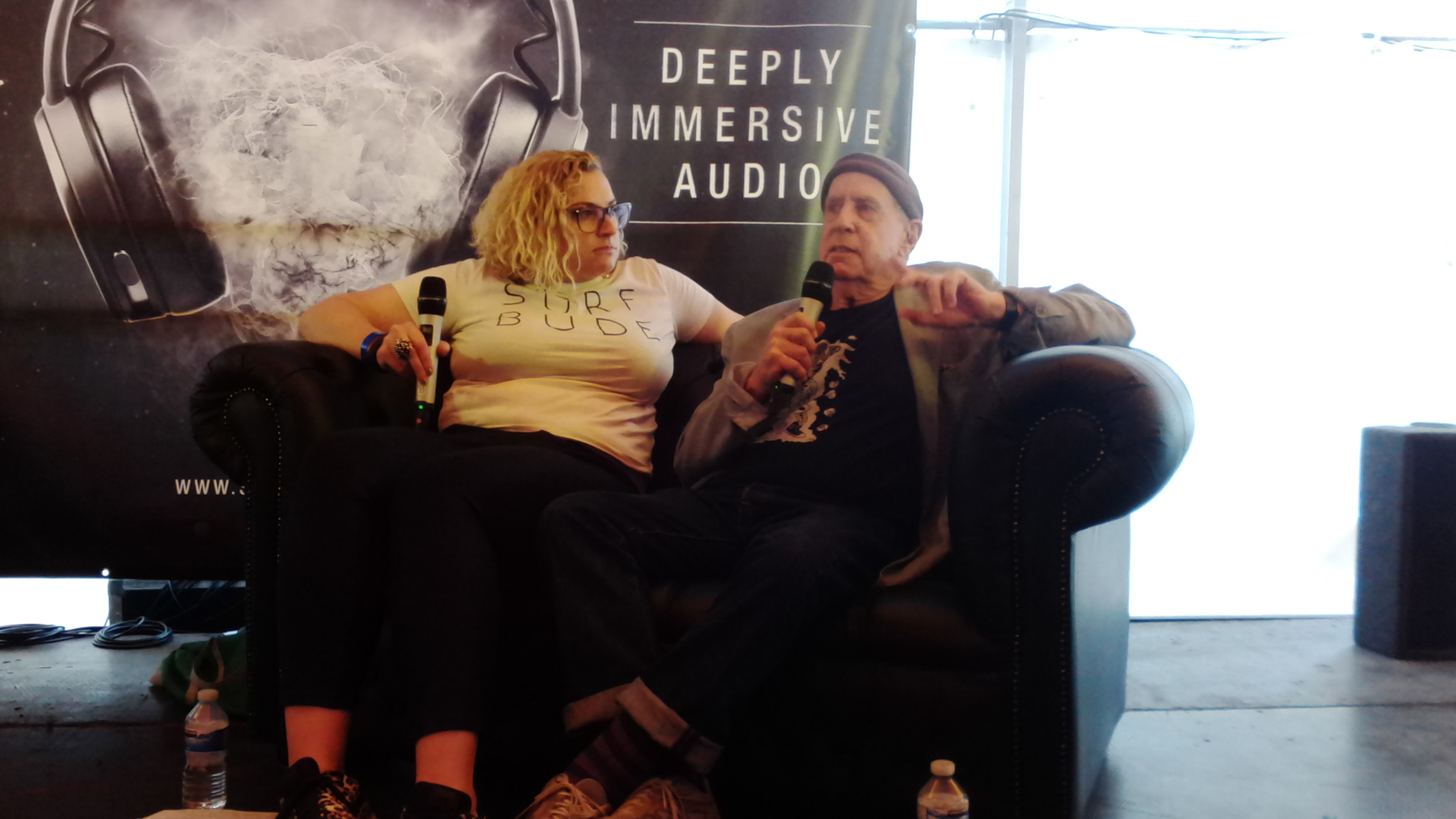
Fields in a discussion with Jennifer Otter Bickerdike at Liverpool Sound City festival 2017

In 2015, Fields discovered East London punk band False Heads in Camden and has been highly influential in the band's career and growing success, naming them as "the future of rock and roll".

== Personal life ==
Fields was one of the first people in the music business to be openly gay.

He currently lives in New York City.

== Film and books ==
Interviews with Fields are included in the documentaries Nico: Icon (1995), We're Outta Here! (1997), 25 Years of Punk (2001), MC5: A True Testimonial (2002), End of the Century: The Story of the Ramones (2003), and A Walk Into the Sea: Danny Williams and the Warhol Factory (2007), It's Alive 1974–1996 (2007), and Lords of the Revolution: Andy Warhol (2009). He is also one of the central characters of Edie: American Girl by Jean Stein and Please Kill Me|Please Kill Me: The Uncensored Oral History of Punk by Legs McNeil and Gillian McCain; the dedication of the latter book reads, "For his gorgeous taste in music, his generous intellect, and his killer sense of humor, this book is dedicated to Danny Fields, forever the coolest guy in the room." The 2006 book The Heebie-Jeebies at CBGB's: A Secret History of Jewish Punk (A Cappella Books/Chicago Review Press), by Steven Lee Beeber, includes a chapter about Fields, entitled, "A Nice Jewish Boy."

Danny Says, a feature-length documentary chronicling Fields' life, premiered at South by Southwest in 2015.
