= Legs McNeil =

American music journalist (born 1956)

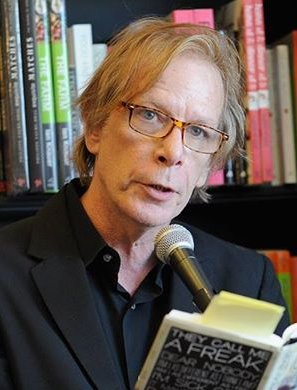
- McNeil in 2014
- Born: Roderick Edward McNeil; January 27, 1956 (age 70); Cheshire, Connecticut, U.S.
- Occupations: Author, writer, rock historian
- Known for: Please Kill Me: The Uncensored Oral History of Punk

Roderick Edward "Legs" McNeil (born January 27, 1956) is an American journalist. He is one of the three original founders of the seminal Punk magazine, as well as being a former editor at Spin and editor-in-chief of Nerve Magazine.

== Punk Magazine ==
At the age of 19, McNeil gathered with two high school friends, John Holmstrom and Ged Dunn, and decided to create "some sort of media thing" for a living. Holmstrom had an idea of combining comics with rock n roll.

== Later work ==
In 1985, McNeil became a SPIN magazine staff writer.

In December 1991, Legs McNeil wrote about the Los Angeles rave culture/scene in "A Woodstock of Their Own", published by Details.

In 1993, Legs was the editor-in-chief of the magazine Nerve.

McNeil is the co-author (with Gillian McCain) of Please Kill Me: The Uncensored Oral History of Punk, which has been published in 12 languages and helped launch the oral history trend in music books. The New York Times called the book "lurid, insolent, disorderly, funny, sometimes gross, sometimes mean and occasionally touching."

McNeil is also co-author of The Other Hollywood: The Uncensored Oral History of the Porn Film Industry. As Publishers Weekly said, "This compulsively readable book perfectly captures the pop culture zeitgeist. It doesn't hurt that the history of American pornography is inextricably intertwined with all the subjects that captivate us: sex, drugs, beauty, fame, money, the Mafia, law enforcement and violence."

McNeil is also the co-author of I Slept with Joey Ramone (A Punk Rock Family Memoir) with Mickey Leigh, Joey Ramone’s brother.

McNeil's most recent book, Dear Nobody: The True Diary of Mary Rose is another collaborative effort with Gillian McCain. Dear Nobody was published on April 1, 2014, and received widespread critical acclaim.

McNeil has appeared on many TV documentaries, from the History Channel to VH1, and has produced and hosted a three-hour TV special on Court TV over three nights on the porn industry, which was the highest-rated original programming in that network's history.

In 2016, a 2014 interview with McNeil was featured in Danny Says, the biographical documentary about the influential rock music publicist, Danny Fields, appearing alongside Fields, Iggy Pop, Alice Cooper, and others.

In 2025 McNeil wrote (with Burt Learns) and directed his first feature documentary film, Pusherman: Frank Lucas & the True Story of American Gangster, starring Frank Lucas, Mark Jacobson, Richie Roberts, Fab5Freddie, Darius James and Michael Daly. Mark Jacobson is the writer who wrote the original article for New York magazine that was transformed into American Gangster, starring Denzel Washington and Russell Crowe. Richie Roberts is the real narcotics cop turned prosecutor that Russell Crowe plays in the American Gangster. Pusherman is the story of Mark Jacobson tracking Frank Lucas down and getting the real story from the subject himself. Pusherman is available on the streaming service Tubi for free, or on DVD from MVD Entertainment Group.

== Mississippi River Excursion ==
In 1986, to commemorate the publication of Adventures of Huckleberry Finn by Mark Twain one hundred years before, Richard Hell and McNeil spent several days on the Mississippi River in inflatable rubber rafts, starting in Hannibal, Missouri and ending in Hamburg, Illinois. They co-wrote an article in the November 1986 issue of Spin magazine recounting their experiences.

== Works ==
=== Oral histories ===
- Please Kill Me: The Uncensored Oral History of Punk with Gillian McCain (Grove Press, 1996).
- The Other Hollywood: The Uncensored Oral History of the Porn Film Industry, with Jennifer Osborne and Peter Pavia (Regan Books, 2006).

=== Memoir ===
- I Slept with Joey Ramone: A Family Memoir with Mickey Leigh (Simon and Schuster, 2009).
- Dear Nobody; The True Diary of Mary Rose edited by Gillian McCain and Legs McNeil (Source Books, 2013).
- Resident Punk: How I Smoked, Drank, and Stumbled My Way Through the '70s Punk Scene (and Beyond) with Crispin Kott (BenBella Books, 2026).
