= False Heads =

English rock band

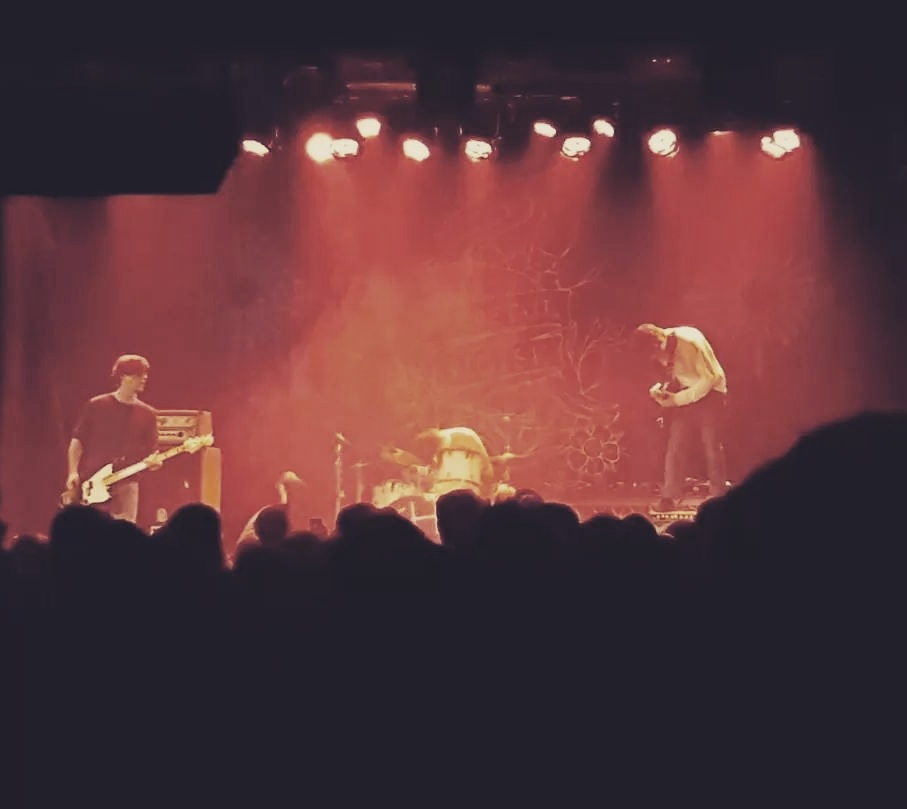
False Heads performing at ULU, London

False Heads are an English, London-based three piece rock/punk band, consisting of Luke Griffiths (vocals/guitar), Jake Elliott (bass) and Charlie Gregory (drums/vocals).

== History ==
Having met at Coopers' Company and Coborn School in Upminster, the three members reconvened after university to make music together in late 2015. While all members had collaborated creatively with each other in the past and Griffiths had previously released music under the title, this marked the first time they began to perform together as False Heads.

While playing at the Black Heart in Camden in November 2015, False Heads caught the attention of former Ramones manager Danny Fields. Fields began to take an interest in and to mentor the band, even declaring that they were "the future of Rock and Roll".

After releasing a number of singles in 2016 and playing venues including the Roundhouse in July 2016 for the 40th anniversary of the Ramones’ performance there, False Heads released their debut EP Gutter Press in March 2017. The EP received critical acclaim and extensive radio play, both domestically and internationally. Alongside being played on BBC Radio 1 and recording a live session on Radio X, Iggy Pop championed the band on his BBC Radio 6 Music programme. In the United States Rodney Bingenheimer regularly praised the band and played Gutter Press tracks on his Sirius XM show. The band also performed at a number of festivals (including Isle of Wight Festival, Y Not Festival and Reading Festival) and supported The Libertines on their 'Tiddeley Om Pom Pom Tour' later that year.

In November 2017 the band were included on the bill at "A Peaceful Noise", a show celebrating the life of Nick Alexander, who was killed during the Bataclan terrorist attack in 2015. False Heads performed alongside Frank Turner, Band of Skulls and Josh Homme at the ULU in Bloomsbury, London.

After being included in The Independent’s list of bands to watch in 2018, False Heads completed their first full length UK tour supporting Strange Bones, headlined their first shows abroad in Hasselt and Paris and performed a headline show at Dingwalls, Camden in support of their single Retina, released on 30 March through AWAL.

After a festival season which included a slot on the main stage at Inmusic, Croatia supporting Queens of The Stone Age, False Heads released their second EP Less Is Better through Cargo Records and These Bloody Thieves in September. In support of this release False Heads embarked on an extensive headline tour, which included their first shows in both Ireland and Germany.

False Heads released single Slease in March 2019, which received regular radio plays domestically (including on BBC Radio 1, BBC Radio 6music and Radio X) and internationally (RTE2 in Ireland and Sirius XM in the USA). After performing at various festivals over the summer (including Rock for People festival in the Czech Republic, Free and Easy Festival in Germany and Tsunami festival in Spain) False Heads announced their signing to Lovers Music, releasing single Fall Around in October in anticipation of their first full length LP, due for release in early 2020.

In March 2020, False Heads released their debut album It's All There But You're Dreaming.

== Discography ==
=== EPs ===
- Gutter Press EP (2017)
- Less is Better EP (2018)
- Cracked EP (2025)

=== Albums ===
- It's All There But You're Dreaming (2020)
- Sick Moon (2022)
