= Bernardo Rivavelarde =

Spanish artist (born 1970)

Bernardo Rivavelarde (born 1970) is a Spanish digital artist and graphic designer.

== Early life and education ==
Rivavelarde was born in Santander, Spain. He studied graphic design at the Escuela de Comunicación Gráfica of Madrid.

== Career ==
In 1999, he presented his first digital exhibition, Escuchando Imágenes (Listening to Images); a proposal to bring together art and graphic design. It offered a selection of images, animations, and interactive artworks. Listening to Image received major Spanish awards in graphic and artistic design, including LAUS and Mobius Awards. Listening to Images debuted at the Valle Quintana Gallery in Madrid.

Rivavelarde collaborated musically with the Spanish electronic-music duo The Lab (Miguel Lázaro & José Corredera). Listening to Images was selected to be part of the exhibition Signs of the Century, 100 Years of Graphic Design in Spain that debuted at the Museo Nacional Centro de Arte Reina Sofía in Madrid. Listening to Images was also selected for the Spanish exhibition Pasión, Spanish Design in Berlin.

From 2000 to 2010, Rivavelarde worked for Nacho Duato, the artistic director for the Spanish National Dance Company. In 2014, Duato became artistic director of the Berlin State Ballet in Germany. Rivavelarde returned to work for Duato in April 2014.

In 2003, Rivavelarde created a new exhibition Homodigitalis; a thirty-minute animated film divided into three parts – "The Body", "The Machine" and "The Future". Homodigitalis was screened at The National Library of Spain in Madrid. It also exhibited in Italy, Mexico and Germany. The music was created by The Lab. Homodigitalis, the film, was released on DVD and its soundtrack on CD.

In 2005 and 2008, Rivavelarde was selected by the publisher Taschen as a leading graphic designer in Graphic Design for the 21st Century, and Contemporary Graphic Design.

In 2012, Rivavelarde presented his third exhibition Future Nature at the Museu de les Ciències Príncipe Felipe, a part of the City of Arts and Sciences, in Valencia. Future Nature includes images, sound landscapes, and motion graphics that show a new environment molded by new technologies. It displays the sea, the clouds, the trees, and the earth differently, offering an invitation to think about something new. The Lab composed the sound design. The exhibition was scheduled from 14 March 2012, to 7 January 2013, but due to its success – with more than 1.5 million visitors – it was extended until 14 April 2013.

Future Nature became a finalist at the 2011 Japan Media Arts Festival in Tokyo and received a mention at the 2011 Prix Ars Electronica in Austria. Future Nature was selected to be shown in the 2012 Yota Space festival in Saint Petersburg, Russia.

In 2021, Rivavelarde presented Portrait of an Artist in Santander.

== Works ==
- Escuchando Imágenes (Listening to Images) 1999
- Homodigitalis 2003
- Future Nature 2012
- Portrait of an Artist 2021
- Unknown 2025
