= Drama of Exile =

1981 studio album by Nico

- Cover for the 1981 LP release by Aura.

Studio album by Nico
- Released: 1981
- Recorded: April–May 1981
- Studio: Music Works Studio, Watford, Hertfordshire, England
- Genre: Gothic rock; art rock; post-punk
- Length: 40:08
- Label: Aura
- Producer: Jean-Marc Philippe Quilichini

Nico chronology
The End... (1974)	Drama of Exile (1981)	Do or Die: Diary 1982 (1982)

Alternative cover
- Cover for the 1993 CD release by Cleopatra Records.

The Drama of Exile
- The original cover used for the release of the re-recorded version.

Studio album by Nico
- Released: 1983
- Recorded: May–June 1981
- Studio: Music Works Studio, Watford, Hertfordshire, England
- Genre: Post-punk; gothic rock; art punk
- Length: 36:15
- Label: Invisible Records
- Producer: Jean-Marc Philippe Quilichini

Nico chronology
Do or Die: Diary 1982 (1982)	The Drama of Exile (1983)	Camera Obscura (1985)

Professional ratings
Review scores
Source	Rating
AllMusic	(1981 version)

Drama of Exile is the fifth studio album by German musician Nico. The album was initially released in 1981 and re-recorded in 1983 as The Drama of Exile. The album featured a Middle Eastern rhythm section and was produced by Corsican bassist Philippe Quilichini. The release is Nico's only studio album not to feature John Cale.

== Background ==
After the release of The End... in 1974, Nico's partnership with Island Records ended, and for the next year, she spent the majority of her time in New York City without a recording contract. During that time, she appeared in a series of Philippe Garrel films.

Nico continued to write new songs and perform intermittently. "Purple Lips," featured in her solo sets as early as March 1975, was also performed on French television in April 1975. The lyrics of the song were recited by Nico in the Philippe Garrel film, Le Berceau de Cristal (1976). The earliest performance of "Genghis Khan" was recorded on August 6, 1975, and "Henry Hudson" began appearing in setlists in February 1977.

By March 1978, after "The Sphinx" was also introduced into her set, Nico titled the album Drama of Exile and attempted a new style at odds with her previous harmonium-based sound. Nico continued to write and had enough songs ready to record the album in 1981.

== Recording and release ==
In 1981, executive producer Nadette Duget, Philippe Quilichini's girlfriend, lived with Nico in London. Duget had heroin connections and supported her own mild drug consumption, as well as Quilichini's and Nico's more serious addictions.

Aura Records offered to finance one album recorded in London and produced by Philippe Quilichini. Contracts were drawn up, Aura advanced the production costs, and recording began almost immediately in April or May 1981. Recorded at Gooseberry Studios in Tulse Hill, London, with a band composed of Quilichini, French-Iranian guitarist, oriental string instrument expert Mahamad Hadi alias Mad Sheer Khan, drummer Steve Cordonna, Ian Dury's saxophone player Davey Payne, percussionist J.J. Johnson of Wayne County's Electric Chairs, and Andy Clark who previously played keyboards on David Bowie's Scary Monsters (And Super Creeps) album. Sessions were attended by French journalist Bruno Blum, a friend of J.J. Johnson's, who later published the inside story in the French rock magazine Best.

The original album was plagued by suspicious circumstances. There are different versions of the story, and the truth remains ambiguous. With the album nearly finished and following a disagreement over money, Aaron Sixx, the head of Aura at the time, allegedly received a tip-off from the studio that Nadette Duget (Nico's unofficial manager) had arranged to steal the master tapes from the studio and sell them without reimbursing Aura, but since Sixx had a signed contract with Duget and Quilichini, Sixx was able to take possession of all the multitrack, unmixed tapes. A legal battle ensued which reportedly lasted almost three years.

Duget claimed Nico had not signed the contract which was true, but since Aura had paid out considerable sums in production costs, they owned the recordings.

== Second recording and release ==
Duget, Quilichini, and photographer Antoine Giacomoni moved to a Linden Gardens basement flat in Notting Hill Gate, London. Violin player Thierry Matioszek was added to the lineup. Nico then recorded "Sãeta" and "Vegas," also produced by Quilichini which was released on the London Flicknife Records label in 1981. Supported by Nico and the musicians, Duget and Quilichini began recording the entire Drama of Exile album again.

Meanwhile, a mix of the unfinished first recording of the Drama of Exile album was released by Aaron Sixx on the Aura Records label in late 1981, with the date written on the back cover. This was allegedly done without the consent of Nico or the musicians and producers. The album cover was reported to have illegally used an Antoine Giacomoni colour photograph. Furthermore, some of the musicians and mixing engineers were allegedly not credited, but Philippe Quilichini was still credited as producer.

During the recording a sound engineer stole the unfinished record and sold it to the company Aura which released it immediately. Of course, we sued them. We re-recorded the album but the court trial took forever. I had neither money nor strength to go on. The most commonly sold version of Drama of Exile is unauthorized. We released the original form with Invisible Records but only in a very small edition and so it's more (of) a collector's item.

— Jacques Pasquier

Completed over the summer at Music Works studio in London, the second recording of the album was mixed by producer Quilichini and released a few months later on the Paris indie label Invisible Records. This version of the album features photographs taken by Matioszek and Giacomoni of Nico, her son Ari, and Quilichini on the inner sleeve. The album cover was a large, black "N" with a white background and a nod to Corsican French emperor Napoleon who ended his life in exile. According to Bruno Blum's 1982 review, the new version was well mixed and unquestionably superior. It also included two extra tracks, "Sãeta" and "Vegas".

False stories of the Aura label having released the only official album with Nico's consent and of Quilichini having secretly copied the first version of the album tapes to remix later emerged:

In 1983, having won the legal battle, Aura proceeded to release the album. P.Q was angry and taking no notice of the legal restrictions involved, went back to Paris with some tapes he had secretly copied during recording. He remixed those tapes and had an illegal version of the album released in France. Aura quickly puts a stop to this album and it was subsequently withdrawn."

— Dave Thompson, liner notes of Nico-Icon CD

Quilichini and his girlfriend also hatched a plan to steal the tapes in a bid to cheat Aura Records and sell them on to another company. Aaron Sixx managed to rescue them with a last minute dash to the studios, but with their plan thwarted the couple severely delayed the release of the album by trying to take him to court. But with the record finally released and lauded by many critics as her best ever, Nico embarked on the usual round of promotional interviews.

— Fraser Massey, liner notes of Drama of Exile, UK CD edition 1996

"It was all really boring, all that quiet stuff," Nico said of her past albums. "And having been a member of The Velvet Underground, rock 'n' roll is something I have to do at some point, even if only for one album"... [Aura label head Aaron] Sixx admitted that Nico "didn't give a shit what happened to the LP, she just wanted the money for drugs." Yet despite these unconventional circumstances, Drama of Exile would see Nico receive some of the best reviews of her career.

— Dave Thompson, Better to Burn Out: The Cult of Death in Rock 'N' Roll

The re-recorded album was mixed by the original producer Philippe Quilichini and issued on Invisible Records in the spring of 1982. Deeply hurt by the legal battle and the fate of his work, Philippe Quilichini became involved with heroin and died in 1983. Nadette Duget left London permanently and flew back to Corsica where she died of anorexia a few months later. This left Aaron Sixx to further release the incomplete first version in the Netherlands and Sweden only with Nico's permission several months after the debacle with the masters. The original version of the LP was released on CD for the first time in Germany by Line Records in 1988. Shortly after, Nico died.

The album was released in the UK by Great Expectations Records in 1989 and in the US by Cleopatra Records in 1993.

The original recording received mixed reviews from critics. AllMusic gave the album three out of five stars. Rolling Stone gave a mostly favorable review, while Trouser Press received the album poorly.

== Musical style ==
Drama of Exile has been described as "a tentative foray into post-punk". In The New Rolling Stone Album Guide, the author writes, "Drama of Exile pairs [Nico] with a thin new wave band that wouldn't have sounded out-of-place on, say, Rough Trade." Nico and the album were covered in Dave Thompson's book on gothic rock, The Dark Reign of Gothic Rock.

== Track listing ==
=== Drama of Exile (1981) ===
All tracks are written by Nico, except where noted.

Side A
No.	Title	Lyrics	Music	Length
1.	"Genghis Khan"			3:52
2.	"Purple Lips"			4:10
3.	"One More Chance"			5:38
4.	"Henry Hudson"			3:54
5.	"I'm Waiting for the Man"	Lou Reed	Reed	4:13

Side B
No.	Title	Lyrics	Music	Length
1.	"Sixty/Forty"			4:50
2.	"The Sphinx"			3:30
3.	"Orly Flight"			3:55
4.	"Heroes"	David Bowie	Bowie, Brian Eno	6:06

=== The Drama of Exile (1983) ===
All tracks are written by Nico, except where noted.

Side A
No.	Title	Lyrics	Music	Length
1.	"One More Chance"			4:13
2.	"The Sphinx"			4:00
3.	"Saēta"			3:40
4.	"Genghis Khan"			3:34
5.	"Heroes"	Bowie	Bowie, Eno	5:41

Side B
No.	Title	Lyrics	Music	Length
1.	"Henry Hudson"			3:46
2.	"60/40"			4:35
3.	"Orly Flight"			2:48
4.	"Vegas"			3:30
5.	"I'm Waiting for My Man"	Reed	Reed	4:14

== Personnel ==
- Nico – vocals

Drama of Exile

- Mahamad Hadi (Mad Sheer Khan) – lead guitar, fretless bouzouki, snitra, backing vocals, piano
- Philippe Quilichini – bass, African percussions, rhythm guitar, synthesizer, backing vocals
- Steve Cordona – drums
- J. J. Johnson – percussion, trumpet
- Davey Payne – saxophone
- Andy Clark – organ, piano, synthesizer

The Drama of Exile

For the remake, the lineup was the same but without Davey Payne, and with additional help from:

- Thierry Matioszek – electric violin, backing vocals
- Gary Barnacle – saxophones, drums
