= Camera Obscura (album) =

Studio album by Nico + the Faction
- Released: 12 July 1985
- Recorded: March–April 1985
- Studio: The Strongroom, Shoreditch, London
- Genre: Dark wave
- Length: 44:30
- Label: Beggars Banquet
- Producer: John Cale

Nico chronology
The Drama of Exile (1981)	Camera Obscura (1985)	Behind the Iron Curtain (1986)

Camera Obscura is the sixth and final studio album by German singer Nico, featuring the backing band the Faction. It was recorded in March–April 1985 and released later that year by Beggars Banquet Records. It was produced by John Cale, marking their first studio collaboration since The End... in 1974. It was Nico's final studio album before her death.

== Recording ==
Nico's vocal style on Camera Obscura is somewhat different from her prior records, with some songs bearing similarities to Dead Can Dance's Lisa Gerrard. The jazz standard "My Funny Valentine", by contrast, has a more standard legato vocal style, despite her very deep contralto. Many of the tracks offer a refined version of the new wave gothic rock of her previous album Drama of Exile. The album is dedicated to her then-manager, Alan Wise.

Sonically, the album follows on from Drama of Exile in that Nico's core songs are given full band arrangements. Whereas Drama of Exile carried a strong North African influence and exotic, new wave-inspired instrumentation, Camera Obscura makes use of synthesizers.

=== Composition ===
The album's oldest composition, "König", was originally recorded for Desertshore and re-recorded some fifteen years later for Camera Obscura. A version was included in the Philippe Garrel film La Cicatrice Intérieure (1972). John Cale reportedly wanted to produce the song with a more percussive, synth-based arrangement in keeping with the rest of the material, but Nico insisted it should be kept as a solo harmonium piece.

Another early song re-imagined for the recording sessions was "Tananore", which Nico had performed at a Cale concert in Marseille on 12 April 1975, and kept in her set ever since. It was used in Joaquín Lledó's 1982 film La vraie histoire de Gérard Lechômeur. Nico had incorporated "My Funny Valentine" into her set since February 1982, and previously at her earliest live performances (at the Blue Angel nightclub in New York City). "My Heart Is Empty" and "Fearfully in Danger", meanwhile, had been set mainstays since her Library Theatre appearance in Manchester on 16 June 1983.

"Das Lied vom einsamen Mädchen" ("The song about the lonely girl") originally derives from the 1952 film Alraune.

== Release ==
Professional ratings
Review scores
Source	Rating
AllMusic	2.5/5 stars
Trouser Press	favorable

Camera Obscura was released in 1985 by Beggars Banquet Records. The album received mixed reviews from critics. AllMusic gave the album two-and-a-half out of five, whereas Trouser Press received the album in a favorable light.

A music video was filmed for "My Heart Is Empty" at the Fridge in Brixton.

Nico performed songs from Camera Obscura up until her death, although there are no known performances of the opening instrumental "Camera Obscura" or the song "Into the Arena".

== Track listing ==
All tracks are written by Nico, except where noted. All arrangements by the Faction.

Side one
No.	Title	Writer(s)	Length
1.	"Camera Obscura"	Nico, John Cale, James Young, Graham Dids	3:42
2.	"Tananore"		4:24
3.	"Win a Few"		6:10
4.	"My Funny Valentine"	Richard Rodgers, Lorenz Hart	3:23
5.	"Das Lied vom einsamen Mädchen"	Robert Gilbert, Werner R. Heymann	5:40

Side two
No.	Title	Length
1.	"Fearfully in Danger"	7:26
2.	"My Heart Is Empty"	4:37
3.	"Into the Arena"	4:12
4.	"König"	4:08
Total length:		44:30

== Personnel ==
- Nico – voice, harmonium

The Faction

- James Young – keyboards, piano on "My Funny Valentine" and "Tananore"
- Graham "Dids" Dowdall (a.k.a. Gagarin) – percussion

with:

- John Cale – additional vocals on "Camera Obscura"
- Ian Carr – flugelhorn on "My Funny Valentine", trumpet on "Into the Arena"

Technical

- David Young – engineer
- Brett Wickens, Christiane Mathan, Peter Saville – sleeve design
- Maarten Corbijn – photography
