= The Lab (Spanish band) =

- Also known as: The Lab Sound
- Origin: Madrid
- Genres: Electronica, Experimental, Downtempo, ambient, ChillOut
- Instrument(s): Electronic devices, piano
- Years active: 1993–present
- Labels: Blanco y Negro Music; Neuronium Records; Animamusic; TheLabSound
- Members: Jose Corredera and Miguel Lazaro
- Website: http://www.thelabsound.com

The Lab (1993) is an electronic music duo from Spain formed by Jose Corredera and Miguel Lazaro.

== Short Biography ==
Jose Corredera and Miguel Lázaro (Madrid, 1980) began his musical project with VMG pseudonym at the age of 13. Under a visual conception of music, using electronic instruments and influences, developed an experimental work during these early years. In 1998, they released the album "Escuchando Images" ("Listening Images"), which was part of the soundtrack of the first electronic art exhibition held in Spain, along with graphic designer Bernardo Rivavelarde.

The Lab was discovered by Michel Huygen, the Spanish electronic musician from Neuronium.

After this first stage, as THE LAB released their first CD entitled "HOMODIGITALIS" with Huygen's label Neuronium Records, which was the soundtrack to the movie of the same name, created again in collaboration with graphic designer Bernardo Rivavelarde, which was released in Biblioteca Nacional de España (Madrid) in 2003. Nacho Duato appears in the movie as a main character. The Album was nominated to Best Electronic Music Album and Best Electronic Track in the Spain Music Awards (Premios de la Música) 2003.

In 2009, The Lab offers HOMODIGITALIS in a free download version through its web www.thelabsound.com, also editing a remastering of the album with extra content in his own label TheLabSound available in all major digital companies (iTunes, Spotify, etc.)

In 2012 The Lab makes a new music work for Bernardo Rivavelarde's "Future Nature" exhibition. This time the music is more a sound design advanced work, exploring the relationship between Nature and Technology. The exhibition was in Valencia (Ciudad de las Artes y las Ciencias) from March 14, 2012 to January 7, 2013, due to the success with more than 1,5 million visitors Future Nature was extended until April 14, 2013. The Lab plays live exclusively at the premiere day.

Analysis Paralysis is The Lab's last work. An EP with 4 tracks. The Analysis Paralysis album represents the get over from an artistical and technical freezing. Jose and Miguel have been working and producing many hours of music since their Homodigitalis album in 2003, but this "Analysis Paralysis" has caused a blockade in their public exposition. The Lab explains and overcome with Analysis Paralysis their state of musical and technical over-analysis, with this autobiographical EP.

They are working in a New EP and in his album "A Day In The Life Lab". The Lab have also collaborated in Dimo Kirilov's choreographies "Collisions" and "Sinking".

== Influences ==
The Lab identifies as early influences the pioneers of electronic popular music in the 60's and 70's: Jean Michel Jarre, Vangelis, Tangerine Dream, Kraftwerk, etc.. as well as many other more experimental like Wendy Carlos or John Cage.

Visual artists like Nam June Paik, Bill Viola, and more recently Chris Cunningham.

== Works ==
=== Discography ===
- Escuchando Imágenes (1998) Original Edition
- Escuchando Imágenes (1999) Extended Edition. 500 copies Limited Edition.
- Homodigitalis (2003)
- Homodigitalis Free Edition (2009)
- Homodigitalis Remastered Edition (2009)
- Future Nature (2012)
- Analysis Paralysis (EP 2013)
- A Day In The Life Lab (?)

=== Singles ===
- Chilling You Out (2003)
- Samsung ChillOut Sessions (2003)
- Ibiza Dreams (2004)
- Maspalomas Chillout (2004)
- Iurantia (2006)
- Chaweng Chillout (2007)
- I Love Chillout 2 (2007)
- Lo Mejor del Chillout (2008)
- Paradisiaco (2008)
