= Live Heroes =

Live album by Nico
- Released: 1986
- Recorded: Europe, 1982
- Venue: Saltlageret (Copenhagen)
- Genre: Rock
- Length: 38:47
- Label: Performance
- Producer: Martin Hannett

Nico chronology
Behind the Iron Curtain (1985)	Live Heroes (1986)	Nico's Last Concert: Fata Morgana (1994)

Professional ratings
Review scores
Source	Rating
AllMusic	3/5 stars

Live Heroes is a compilation album recorded by Nico with the Blue Orchids, the Invisible Girls and Samarkand (Mahamad Hadi). The tracks "Heroes", "Valley of the Kings" and "Femme Fatale" were recorded live at Saltlageret in Copenhagen on October 5, 1982, while the tracks "Procession" and "All Tomorrow's Parties" were recorded during a studio session with the Invisible Girls and Martin Hannett.

== Track listing ==
No.	Title	Writer(s)	Length
1.	"Heroes"	David Bowie, Brian Eno	8:19
2.	"Procession"	Nico	4:45
3.	"My Funny Valentine"	Richard Rodgers, Lorenz Hart	4:07
4.	"All Tomorrow's Parties"	Lou Reed	5:28
5.	"Valley of the Kings"	Nico	3:10
6.	"Femme Fatale"	Lou Reed	3:07
7.	"The End"	The Doors	9:51
Total length:			38:47

== Personnel ==
Credits adapted from album's liner notes.

- Nico – vocal, harmonium
- The Invisible Girls – arrangements, performers (tracks 2, 4)
- Samarkand (Mahamad Hadi) – backing band (tracks 1, 3, 7)
- The Blue Orchids – backing band (tracks 6)
- Martin Hannett – producer (tracks 2, 4)
- Robert Speiden – mastering
- Murray Brenman – design
- Arthur Marko – design concept
- Stephen Kaplan – design concept
