= Neuronium =

Spanish electronic music group

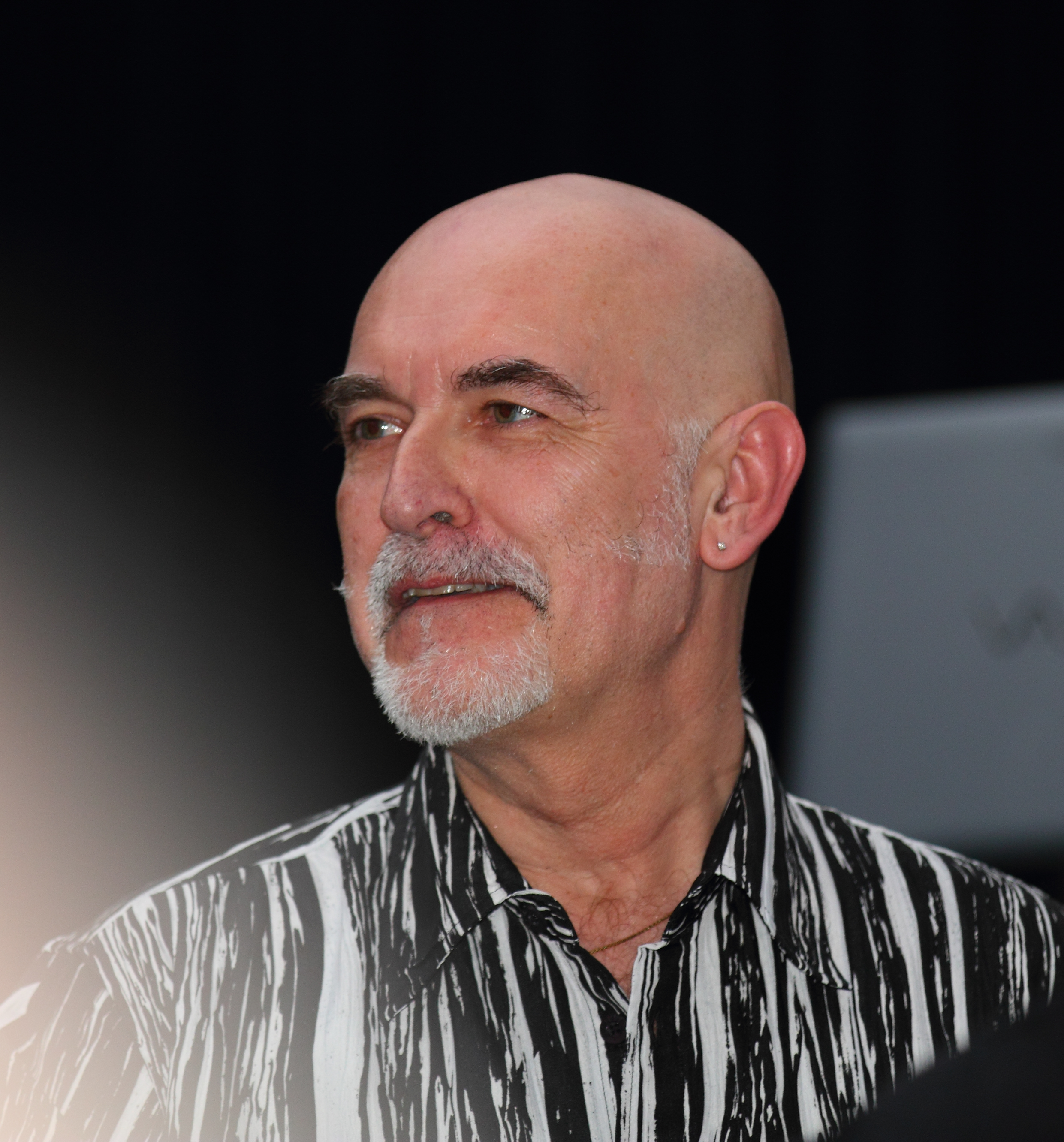

Background information
- Origin: Barcelona, Catalonia, Spain
- Genres: electronic, space music, progressive music
- Years active: 1977–present
- Label: Neuronium Records
- Members: Michel Huygen
- Past members: Carlos Guirao; Albert Giménez; Santi Pico

Neuronium is a Spanish electronic music group created by Michel Huygen in 1976. The group has released over 40 albums since then on the Neuronium/Michel Huygen label.

== History ==
Neuronium was founded in 1976 as a psychedelic rock quintet with a percussionist, bassist, guitarist and two synthetists. Later, synthesist/guitarists Michel Huygen and Carlos Guirao, and guitarist Albert Giménez changed style to so-called "cosmic music", recording the album Quasar 2C361, released in Spain in 1977 by the label EMI-Harvest. Neuronium's second album Vuelo Químico was inspired by the lyrics of Edgar Allan Poe. Singer Nico recorded vocal parts of the title track. The album was released in 1978. Albert Giménez subsequently left the band.

In 1980, Neuronium released the album Digital Dream, with the participance of guitarist Santi Picó on their own label Neuronium Records. Musician and producer Klaus Schulze made a remix of the album free of charge, but Neuronium chose to release their own mix of the album because of the legal restraints.

Neuronium collaborated with Vangelis in 1981. An edited recording of their performance on the Spanish television programme Musical Express was released under the titles In London in 1992, Separate Affair in 1996, and In London (Platinum Edition) in 2002.

The Visitor (1981) and Chromium Echoes (1982) were the last albums recorded with Carlos Guirao. At the same time as those two albums were released, Michel Huygen and Carlos Guirao released the solo albums Absence of Reality and Revelation, respectively. Thereafter, Huygen became the only constant member of Neuronium, with occasional collaborations from guitarist Santi Picó.

The Spanish artist Tomás C. Gilsanz created cover art for the band's albums and the images projected on the stage background during live performances. Gilsanz was sometimes mentioned as a non-musical part of Neuronium.

In May 1986, Huygen was inaugurated by Queen Sofia of Spain as the person in charge of the department of electronic music of the Queen Sofía Centre of Art in Madrid.

Subsequent albums included Sybaris (1991), Hydro (2001), Azizi (2002), Sensorial (2004), and Exosomnia (2012). Hydro (2001) became Huygen's best-selling work, selling more than 150,000 copies worldwide.

Neuronium Records was created in 2002 as Huygen's personal label, which released works from artists such as Suzanne Ciani, Constance Demby, Jonn Serrie, and The Lab.

Neuronium's music spans several electronic music styles, including new-age, ambient, space music, and progressive electronic music.

== Discography ==
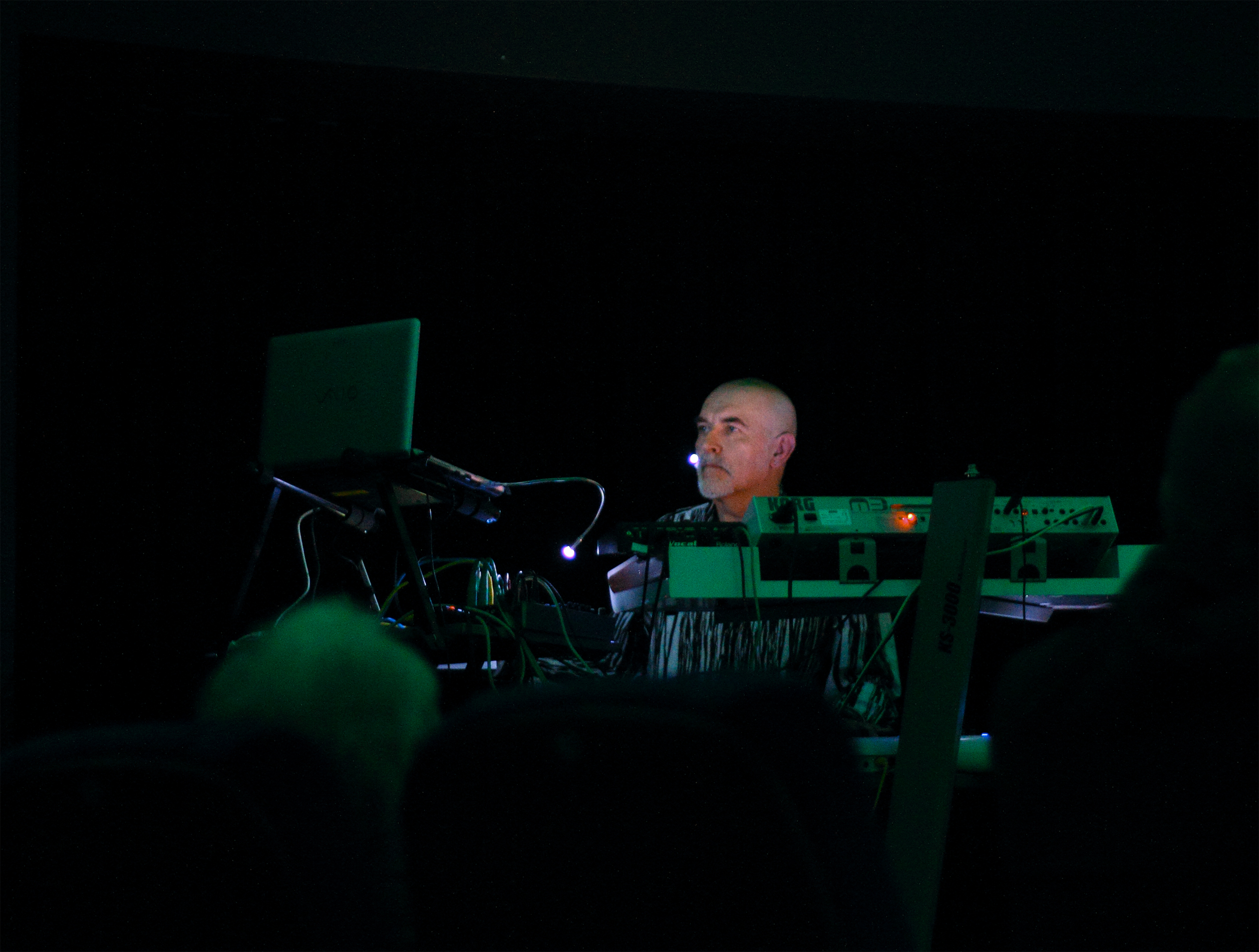
Neuronium live in Bochum (Germany), 2012

=== Albums ===
- (1977): Quasar 2C361 (Neuronium)
- (1978): Vuelo Quimico (Neuronium)
- (1980): Digital Dream (Neuronium) remastered as The New Digital Dream, with new cover
- (1981): The Visitor (Neuronium) remastered as The New Visitor, with new cover
- (1982): Chromium Echoes (Neuronium)
- (1982): Absence of Reality (Huygen)
- (1983): Invisible Views (Neuronium)
- (1984): Heritage (Neuronium)
- (1984): Capturing holograms (Huygen)
- (1986): Barcelona 1992 (Huygen)
- (1987): Supranatural (Neuronium)
- (1988): From Madrid to Heaven (live) (Neuronium)
- (1989): Elixir (Huygen)
- (1990): Olim (Neuronium)
- (1990): Numerica (Neuronium)
- (1990): Intimo (Huygen)
- (1991): Extrisimo (Neuronium, including tracks from Huygen's solo works)
- (1991): Sybaris (Neuronium)
- (1992): En busca del misterio (Huygen)
- (1993): Oniria (Neuronium)
- (1994): Infinito (Huygen)
- (1995): Música para la buena mesa (Huygen) (collection of tracks from other albums by Neuronium and Michel Huygen)
- (1995): Sonar (live) (Neuronium)
- (1995): Astralia (Huygen)
- (1997): Psykya (Neuronium)
- (1999): Ultracosmos (Huygen)
- (1999): Alienikon (Neuronium)
- (2000): Directo al Corazón (Huygen)
- (2001): Hydro (Neuronium)
- (2002): Placebo (Huygen)
- (2002): Azizi ( Neuronium)
- (2005): Mystykatea (Neuronium)
- (2006): Synapsia (Neuronium)
- (2006): Angkor - Extreme Meditation. Vol.1 (Huygen)
- (2007): Irawadi - Extreme Meditation. Vol.2 (Huygen)
- (2008): Nihilophobia (Neuronium)
- (2010): Etykagnostyka (Neuronium)
- (2010): Hydro 2. The Deep End (Neuronium)
- (2010): Krung Thep – Extreme Meditation Vol.3 (Huygen)
- (2012): Exosomnia (Neuronium)
- (2014): Nocny Lot. Live Concert in Poland (Neuronium)
- (2015): Jamais Vu (Neuronium)
- (2017): Lysergic Dream (Neuronium)

=== Singles ===
- (1978): "Vuelo Quimico/Abismo De Terciopelo" (Neuronium)
- (1980): "Privilege" (Neuronium)
- (1982): "Prelude" (Neuronium)
- (1983): "Decision" (Neuronium)
