= Gillian McCain =

Canadian poet

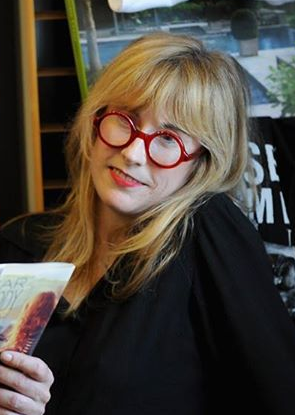
McCain in 2014

Gillian McCain (born January 1, 1966) is a Canadian poet, author, and photography collector best known for Please Kill Me: The Uncensored Oral History of Punk, which she co-wrote with Legs McNeil. McCain is the author of two books of poetry: Tilt and Religion. Portions of her "found photo" collection have been featured in magazines, published as limited edition books, and exhibited at the Camera Club of New York gallery. She sat on the board of directors of the Nova Scotia College of Art and Design in Halifax and was the Chair of the Board of Directors of the Poetry Project at St. Mark's Church in-the-Bowery New York City.

== Education and personal life ==
McCain was born in Bath, New Brunswick, Canada. She attended the University of King's College in Halifax, Nova Scotia, where she earned a B.A in Literature. She moved to New York City in 1987 where she went on to complete a M.A. in Literature at New York University in 1990. In 1988, McCain studied in the Naropa Institute's summer program.

Following her graduation from New York University, McCain was hired by the Poetry Project at St. Mark's Church in-the-Bowery, where she served as program coordinator (1991–1994), editor of the Poetry Project Newsletter (1994–1995), and edited four issues of the lit-zine Milk. In 1991 she founded the Friday Night Series—a weekly event that featured poetry, fiction, non-fiction, theme readings, tributes, lectures, performance art and music. In four years she brought in over four hundred artists. The series continues to this day. She devoted herself to writing full-time in 1995.

McCain married James "Jim" Marshall, a writer, whom she met at the Poetry Project, in 2002.

== Author ==
=== Non-fiction ===
In 1996, Grove Press published Please Kill Me: The Uncensored Oral History of Punk, which McCain co-wrote with Legs McNeil. Composed of the excerpts from hundreds of interviews, Please Kill Me presents a unique view of a volatile and complex period in American history. The book spans the early-Punk period of the Velvet Underground through the rise and fall of Punk icons Iggy Pop, the Ramones, and more.

Please Kill Me was an instant hit and has since become a cult classic, inspiring a new era of musical oral histories. Upon its initial release Please Kill Me was a Time Out and Daily News Top Ten book of the year. A review in Time Out New York said the book, "Ranks up there with the great rock & roll books of all time." Excerpts of the book appeared in Vanity Fair in concert with the book's release in 1996. It is now published in Brazil, China, The Czech Republic, Finland, France, Germany, Great Britain, Italy, Japan, Poland, Russia, Sweden and Spain.

In 2014, McCain and McNeil collaborated again to edit Dear Nobody: The True Diary of Mary Rose, a compilation of journal entries written by a 17-year-old Pennsylvania teenager who suffered from drug addiction, alcoholism, and cystic fibrosis. Publishers Weekly described the book as a "rare, no-holds-barred documentation of an American teenager's life, written for no audience but herself." Dear Nobody has garnered positive reviews since its release and has been praised as a true version of the 1971 novel Go Ask Alice. McCain and Mary Rose's mother were interviewed in 2014 for a segment called, "The Diary of a Teenage Girl: ‘The Jane Austen Of Juvenile Delinquents’" for the Leonard Lopate Show on WNYC-FM.

=== Adaptations ===
Gillian McCain and Legs McNeil's Please Kill Me has been adapted into a stage production by French director Mathieu Bauer. The "punk musical" was written in 2011 and has since been taken on tour throughout France by the Nouveau Theatre Montreuil.

=== Poetry ===
In her early writing career, Gillian McCain was initially intrigued by free verse poetry, however, while studying with poet Larry Fagin, she became attracted to prose poetry. McCain published her first book of poetry, Tilt, in 1996. In Tilt, McCain reflects on the impact the New York School of poetry and the day-to-day chaos and intensity of life had on her. Tilt has received accolades for its "chatty, detached style." Said poet John Ashbery of Tilt, "Gillian McCain's poems are like urgent telegrams from the next door, or oddly but brilliantly cropped snapshots of a life that is going by." Author and poet Harry Mathews called it a, "brilliant collection of prose poems.

McCain published another book of poetry, Religion, in 1999. Her second published collection of poetry was very well received. "Her work features ‘I did this then I did that’ New York School immediacy, but undermines it with ironic distance that collapses any naïve faith in the immediate as a source of value," said poet Mark Wallace in a review in the Poetry Project Newsletter.

McCain obtains lines for her poetry from a multitude of everyday sources, including overheard conversations and random lines from books, magazines, and newspapers. She says that writing poetry is like "treasure hunting." The Encyclopedia of The New York School Poets describes her thusly: "As a poet, she writes prose that manages to be both playful and deadly serious in its criticism of its of FORM, the forms of contemporary society, and the forms of opposition to society that the readers of New York School poetry may take for granted a little too readily."

== Photography ==
=== Help Me: Found Photos from the Collection of Gillian McCain ===
In 2010 Gillian McCain co-curated (with artist Megan Cump) a selection of "found photographs" from her collection. Entitled "HELP ME," the photographs were exhibited at the gallery of the Camera Club of New York. Forgotten, discarded, orphaned, lost; stolen, bought, discovered or found; the vernacular images in "HELP ME" were culled from McCain's extensive collection of photographs in formats including tin-types, cabinet cards, Polaroids, and snapshots. In The New Yorker, photography critic Vince Aletti called the exhibition "exhilarating," stating, "Images of rifles, costumes, and injuries crop up repeatedly, but there's no real theme, only plenty of diverting quirkiness and inspiration." The Help Me exhibition was also featured in the December, 2010 issue of the French magazine, Photo. A limited edition book also titled Help Me, was published in conjunction with the exhibition.

=== "Fifty Fotos Found by Fang With Text by The Hound" ===
McCain's Fifty Fotos Found by Fang With Text by The Hound, a collaboration with husband (and fellow author) James "The Hound" Marshall in 2010, features found photos with descriptions penned by Marshall and commentary by readers from his popular music website where the photos were initially posted. "Fang" and "The Hound" are sobriquets for McCain and Marshall respectively. Author Joe Bonomo, in his blog No Such Thing As Was, says of the book, "In Fifty Fotos Found there's young love, old love, doubtful love, drinking, hamming, military life, beach bums and barflies, nudie posters on the wall, maybe-pimps, parties, teenagers, bedrooms, and basements, a generous slice of living enacted by mysterious strangers caught in perpetuity doing strange things, or things so ordinary that they become strange. Blink and you'd miss it."

McCain's found photo collection has also been featured in the 2014 issue of the Columbia Poetry Review. A feature entitled, "Sleepwalking: Photographs from the Collection of Gillian McCain" was published in issue 14 of Lid magazine in 2012.

== Selected works ==
Non-fiction:

- Please Kill Me: The Uncensored Oral History of Punk with Legs McNeil (Grove Press, 1996)
- Dear Nobody: The True Diary of Mary Rose with Legs McNeil (Sourcebooks Fire, 2014)
- Help Me: Found Photos from the Collection of Gillian McCain with Megan Cump (2010)

Poetry:

- Tilt (The Figures/Hard Press, 1996)
- Religion (The Figures, 1999)
- Descent of the Dolls: Part I (a collaboration with Jeffery Conway and David Trinidad, BlazeVOX [books], 2017)
