= Danny Says (film) =

- Film poster
- Directed by: Brendan Toller
- Written by: Brendan Toller
- Produced by: Pamela Lubell
- Release date: March 18, 2015 (SXSW)
- Running time: 104 minutes
- Country: United States
- Language: English

Danny Says is a 2015 documentary film on the life and times of Danny Fields. The film is directed by Brendan Toller and produced by Pamela Lubell. Magnolia Pictures acquired the worldwide rights in January 2016.

In 2015, Danny Says was featured on "The Year in Kickstarter" with the headline "a filmmaker discovered a piece of rock & roll history." The headline cites an unearthed audio tape of Lou Reed listening to the Ramones for the first time.

== Release ==
Danny Says had its world premiere at South by Southwest on March 18, 2015.

=== Critical response ===
Danny Says has received mixed reviews from critics. Review aggregator Rotten Tomatoes gives the film an approval rating of 74%, based on 31 reviews, with an average rating of 6.52/10. On Metacritic, the film has a score of 64 out of 100, based on 11 critics, indicating "generally favorable" reviews.

Variety named the film one of the "13 Breakout Films of SXSW," writing, "Rock gadfly Danny Fields reminiscences of the 1960s and 1970s are pure gold in Brendan Toller's documentary... Assembly is first-rate, with mix of sterling archival materials and starry talking heads echoing the subject's gossipy, profane, impudent manner. Several lively animated sequences further diversify the package. The soundtrack, needless to say, is a mix tape dream."

=== Box office ===
Continuing on the festival circuit, Danny Says was selected as the Opening Night Film of the Film Society of Lincoln Center's Sound + Vision Festival. The screening sold out in three days.

The film had a limited theatrical release by Magnolia Pictures beginning September 30, 2016.
