= Carlos Guirao (musician) =

Spanish musician and composer

- Born: Carlos Guirao Felices; 23 February 1954; Barcelona, Spain
- Died: 17 January 2012 (aged 57) Barcelona, Spain
- Genres: electronic music Progressive rock
- Occupation: Musician
- Instruments: keyboard, Guitar
- Years active: 1970–2012
- Labels: At-mooss records, PDI
- Formerly of: Neuronium; Programa; Cherish Band; Gato viejo Atlanta
- Website: http://carlosguirao.blogspot.com

Carlos Guirao Felices was a musician and composer born in Barcelona 23 February 1954. He died in Barcelona 17 January 2012.

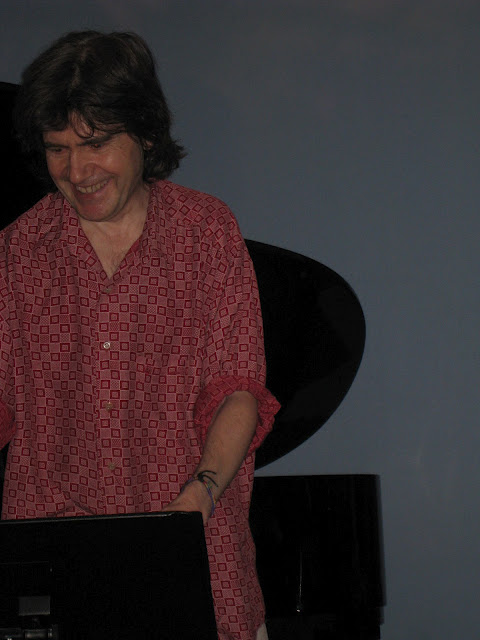
Carlos Guirao after the concert in Badalona 27 June 2008

Carlos Guirao was member of several groups being the most well-known Neuronium, Programa and Cherish Band. In 1981 he performed for the Spanish Television program "Musical Express". This program consisted of interviews and performances. This program included a performance of Carlos and Michel Huygen jointly with Vangelis at the Nemo Studio in London. Videos of this performance exist. In this period he was also in touch with Klaus Schulze, who initially had to prepare the mixing of his third LP Digital dream. They also played a jam session with Teddy Bautista and Ash Ra Tempel for "Musical express".

== Discography ==
(1977): Quasar 2C361 (Neuronium)

(1978): Vuelo quimico (Neuronium)

(1980): Digital dream (Neuronium)

(1981): The visitor (Neuronium)

(1982): Chromium echoes (Neuronium)

(1982): Revelation (Carlos Guirao)

(1983): Sintesis digital (Programa)

(1984): Maxi Impacto-Reunion de amigos (Programa)

(1985): Acropolis (Programa)

(1986): Paris Dakar (Programa)

(2002): A Separate Affair (Neuronium – Vangelis)

(2005): Pesadillas de un ser viviente (Carlos Guirao, unpublished)

(2008): Ensayos bajo una tormenta (Carlos Guirao, unpublished)

(2010): Symphony (Carlos Guirao)

(2011): Alchemy (Loibant & Guirao)

(2011): Brumas (Carlos Guirao)

(2011): El vuelo de las almas miticas (Carlos Guirao)

(2012): PubLine (Carlos Guirao concierto en Lleida, unpublished)

(2012): Queda vida.....(Cherish Band)

(2012): OpRock (Carlos Guirao, unpublished)

(2012): Magics (Carlos Guirao, unpublished)

(2012): Excerpts (Carlos Guirao, unpublished)
