= James Young (British musician) =

British musician (born 1952)

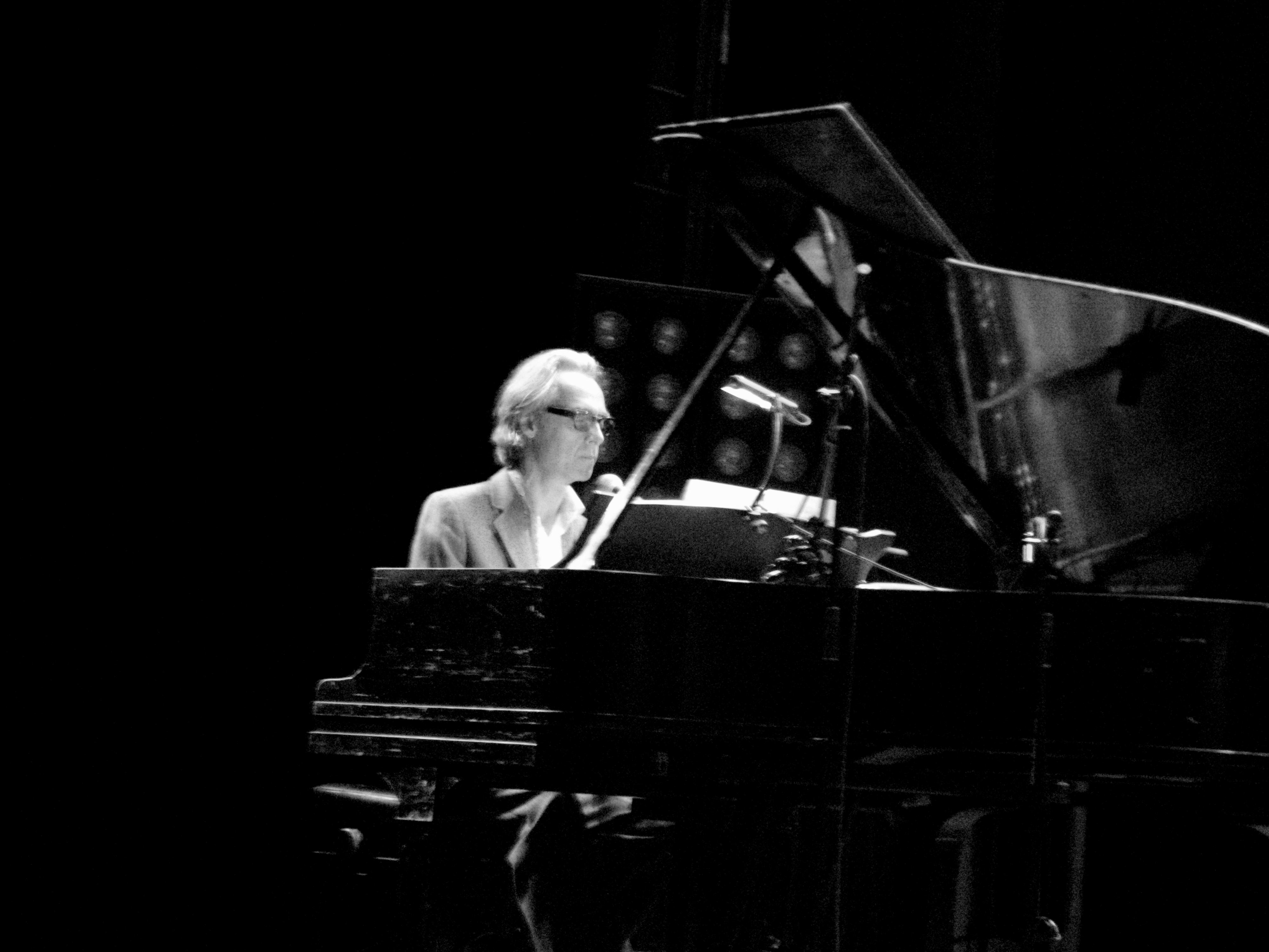
James Young performing live at The Volksbuhne, Berlin, Germany 2008 (photo Gaga Nielsen)

James Edward Young (born 17 September 1952) is a British musician and writer. Young grew up in Oldham, Lancashire and began learning piano at the age of 7. He studied Art History briefly at the University of East Anglia before moving to Oxford to study at the polytechnic and in 1982 was accepted as an M.Phil. student at Oxford University. This period coincided with his meeting Nico (Velvet Underground) and Young took the decision to work with her instead of continuing with academic life. Young toured and recorded as keyboard player and arranger with the group The Faction until Nico's death in 1988. Since then, Young has written books, recorded solo albums, created BBC radio features, written on Outsider Art and curated exhibitions.

== Discography ==
=== Studio albums ===
With Nico + Faction:

- Camera Obscura (1985 Beggars Banquet bb1 63 cd)

With John Cale:

- Artificial Intelligence (1985 Beggars –Banquet Bega 68)

With Faction:

- Bag (Third Mind Records TMLP 29)
- Heaven (Third Mind Records TMLP 56)

With Suns of Arqa

- Land of a Thousand Churches 1987 (ARKA 2101 CD)

=== Live albums ===
With Nico

- Nico in Tokyo (+ Faction) 1986 Cherry Red Records CDM 19
- Behind The Iron Curtain (+ Faction) 1986 DOJO CD27
- Nico’s Last Concert ‘Fata Morgana’ (+Faction) 1988 SPV CD 084-96202
- Hanging Gardens 1990 Restless 7 72383-2
- All Tomorrow’s Parties 2007 Cherry Red Records CDM 25

=== Solo albums ===
In 1994 Young was invited by Alan McGee, founder of Creation Records, to record a musical representation of his memoir of the Nico years (see below).

- Songs They Never Play On the Radio 1994 Creation Records Crecd 158

In 2003 Young recorded an album of solo piano music: joanna 2003 (Voiceprint BP357CD) produced by Henry Olsen. (see below)

== Film ==
Young appeared in the award-winning documentary Nico Icon (1996) describing his life touring with Nico.

== Writing ==
Young's memoir of his years performing and travelling with Nico Songs they Never Play on the Radio, (US title: Nico The End) was published to international critical acclaim in 1993, winning the In The City award for music book of the year. Described by Greil Marcus in Esquire as ‘A coolly literary masterpiece about the geography of nowhere’, the book was later serialized in 1996 for BBC Radio 4. Songs They Never Play On The Radio (Bloomsbury Publishing) ISBN 978 07475 4411 1 Nico The End (Overlook Press) ISBN 0-87951-545-7 This was followed in 1996 by Moscow Mule ((Century) ISBN 0 71 2 66005 4), a dystopian travelogue situated within and around the Moscow Metro, also serialized for BBC Radio 4 in 1997. Young interpreted the book's milieu in Last Train To Taganskaya recorded for the BBC Radio 3 experimental audio feature Between The Ears.

For the bi-centennial of the Russian poet Alexander Pushkin in 1999, Young created a sound portrait for BBC Radio 3 Pushkinskaya, of Moscow's Pushkin Square, featuring Moscow voices and readings by Ralph Fiennes.

During the period of the early 1990s Young was exposed to the then marginalized world of Russian Outsider Art. He became instrumental in introducing the genre to the West, chiefly through articles in the magazine Raw Vision.

== 2000 to present ==
Young's 2003 release joanna is to date his only solo unaccompanied album. A portrait of his battered old upright piano, it was described in The Guardian as ‘a hymn of devotion that both dignifies and delights in his old piano's imperfections.’

Coinciding with the release of joanna, a period of illness, adhesive capsulitis of the shoulder, affected the use of Young's arms and prevented him from performing.

In 2006 Young was invited to co-curate the exhibition The Fabric of Myth at Compton Verney Warwickshire.

Young returned to the stage in October 2008 with The Golden Hunger, a ‘Liederabend’ referencing Berlin's post-war creative drive, as part of the Nico tribute evening Nico 70/20 at The Volksbühne in Berlin.

Recently Young has been working as producer with the Scottish poet, singer and performance artist MacGillivray.

Currently Young is completing two albums: The Golden Hunger (see above) and I Feel The Air Of Other Planets based on the Stefan Georg poem Entrückung (Rapture).

In June 2020 The Times listed 'Nico: Songs They Never Play On The Radio' number 2 in 'The Ten Best Music Memoirs'.
