= Jennifer Otter Bickerdike =

American writer

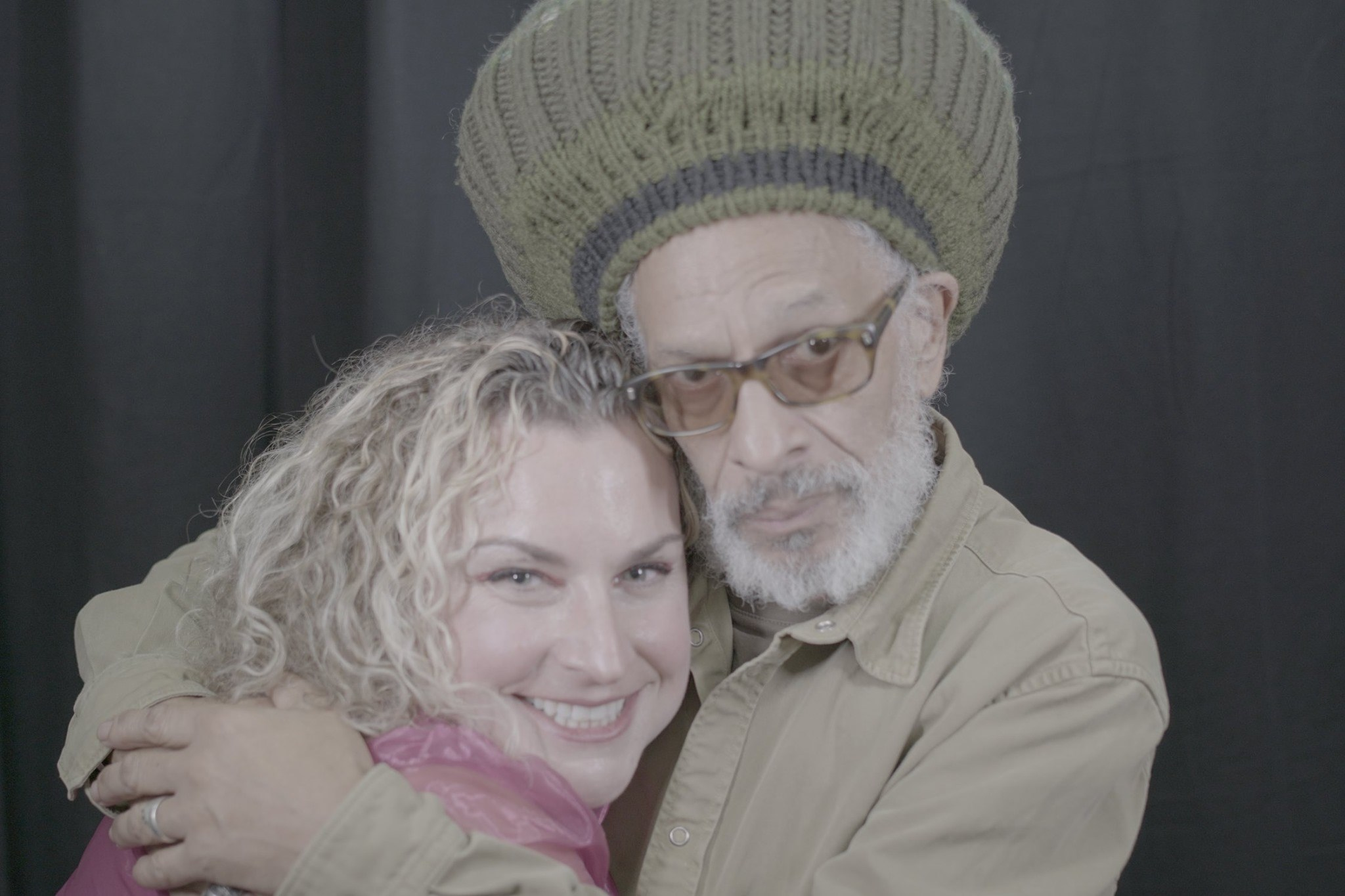
- Jennifer Otter Bickerdike with Don Letts
- Education: University of California, Davis (BA); San Francisco State University (MA); Goldsmiths, University of London (PhD)
- Occupations: Author; media and music academic
- Website: jenniferotterbickerdike.com

Jennifer Otter Bickerdike is an American cultural historian, author, and broadcaster whose work focuses on music culture, fandom, celebrity, and media history. She is the author of several books on popular music and cultural identity, and appears as a cultural commentator on the BBC and in documentary programming. Her work also includes music heritage and archival projects, and she is a founder of Legends Live & Local, a Santa Cruz–based music and dialogue series pairing established musicians with emerging artists.

== Early life and education ==
Otter Bickerdike was raised in Santa Cruz, California. She studied American Studies at the University of California, Davis, where she began working in the music industry. During this period she held a College Music Representative position with Sony Music Entertainment and completed internships with record companies including PolyGram, MCA Records, and Universal Music Distribution.

She later earned a master's degree in humanities from San Francisco State University. After relocating to the United Kingdom, she completed doctoral research in cultural studies at Goldsmiths, University of London, focusing on music fandom, cultural memory, and mythology in popular music, specifically looking at Nirvana and post-punk pioneers Joy Division.

== Music industry career ==
Otter Bickerdike worked in music marketing and artist development, including serving as West Coast Marketing Director for Interscope Geffen A&M Records. Her work involved touring support, branding, and marketing campaigns for recording artists across rock, hip-hop, and pop genres, including Nirvana, Pearl Jam, Rage Against the Machine, Dr. Dre, No Doubt, Gwen Stefani, U2, and Eminem.

She later founded a consulting company working with organisations in the creative, music, and technology sectors, including Facebook, Key Production, Moving The Needle, Music for America, Fuzz, Adeline Records, and Tom Dumont.

== Cultural heritage and archival work ==
Otter Bickerdike has worked on music heritage, archival, and exhibition projects connected to popular music history. This has included archival research, exhibition curation, and liner note writing, including contributions to Wham!’s 40th-anniversary box set and the Herbert Art Gallery & Museum in Coventry's 2 Tone: Lives & Legacies exhibition.

== Media and writing ==
Otter Bickerdike is a commentator on music, fandom, celebrity, and media history. She is a frequent contributor to the BBC and has appeared in pop culture documentaries, including Taylor Swift Versus Scooter Braun: Bad Blood (2024).

She is the author of several books on music and cultural history, including Eternal Flame: The Authorized Biography of The Bangles (2024), Being Britney: Pieces of a Modern Icon (2021), You Are Beautiful and You Are Alone: The Biography of Nico (2021), Why Vinyl Matters (2017), Joy Devotion (2016), The Secular Religion of Fandom (2015), and Fandom, Image and Authenticity (2014).

She has written on music and popular culture for publications including The Guardian, Louder Than War, Long Live Vinyl, Bass Guitar, Playboy, and Discogs.

She has collaborated editorially with musicians on book projects, including work with Mike Joyce, Jane Wiedlin, Will Sergeant, and projects connected to Iggy Pop and The Stooges.

== Cultural programming and industry advocacy ==
Otter Bickerdike is a co-founder of Legends Live & Local, a Santa Cruz–based live music and dialogue series that brings established musicians into conversation and performance with emerging artists. The initiative combines live performance, storytelling, and mentorship, and has partnered with local cultural organisations and sponsors.

She was also a co-founder of Moving the Needle, a music industry initiative supporting women's careers in creative work.

== Awards and recognition ==
In 2013 she received a Student-Led Teaching Award for innovative lecturing and was shortlisted nationally by Times Higher Education.

In 2019 she appeared on the cover of Good Times, a Santa Cruz publication. In September of the same year, Santa Cruz mayor Martine Watkins proclaimed September 28 officially 'Jennifer Otter Bickerdike Day' in honor of Otter Bickerdike's contributions to music culture and community in her hometown.

== Bibliography ==
- Eternal Flame: The Authorized Biography of The Bangles (Hachette Books, 2024) ASIN B0D62NNQGZ
- Being Britney: Pieces of a Modern Icon (Bonnier / Nine Eight, 2021) ISBN 9781788705240
- You Are Beautiful and You Are Alone: The Biography of Nico (Faber & Faber / Hachette, 2021) ISBN 0571350011
- Why Vinyl Matters: A Manifesto from Musicians and Fans (ACC Art Books, 2017) ISBN 9781851498635
- Joy Devotion: The Importance of Ian Curtis and Fan Culture (Headpress, 2016), ISBN 9781909394285
- The Secular Religion of Fandom (Sage, 2015) ISBN 978-1473907799
- Fandom, Image and Authenticity: Joy Devotion and the Second Lives of Kurt Cobain and Ian Curtis (Palgrave MacMillan, 2014) ISBN 9781137393524
