= The End... =

Studio album by Nico
- Released: November 1974
- Recorded: Summer 1974
- Studios: Sound Techniques, London, England
- Genre: Avant-folk
- Length: 42:02
- Label: Island
- Producer: John Cale

Nico chronology
June 1, 1974 (1974)	The End... (1974)	Drama of Exile (1981)

The End... is the fourth studio album by German musician Nico, released in November 1974 through the label Island. It was recorded in summer 1974 at Sound Techniques studio in London and produced by John Cale.

== Background ==
Nico had performed two songs from the album a few years prior to the album release; "Secret Side" had been performed at a John Peel session for the BBC on 2 February 1971 and she had also performed "You Forget to Answer" on TV in France and the Netherlands in early 1972.

== Recording ==
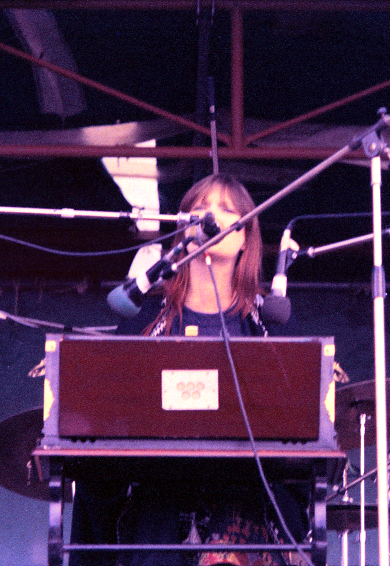
Nico, playing harmonium, Hyde Park concert, 1974

The End... is her fifth collaboration with John Cale and second with him as producer. It carries the same harmonium-based sound heard on The Marble Index (1968) and Desertshore (1970), with the addition of Brian Eno's synthesizers and electronic instruments.

The song "You Forget to Answer" tells of the misery felt by Nico when she failed to reach ex-lover, and Doors' singer, Jim Morrison by phone only to find out later that he had died. The album was her first since Morrison's death in 1971. All but two of the songs on the album were written by Nico: the cover of the Doors' "The End" and a version of West Germany's national anthem "Das Lied der Deutschen". Brian Eno plays synthesizer on "It Has Not Taken Long", "You Forget to Answer" and "Innocent and Vain".

The front and back covers feature stills from the Philippe Garrel film Les hautes solitudes (1974) in which Nico appears with Jean Seberg.

== Release and reception ==
Professional ratings
Review scores
Source	Rating
AllMusic	4.5/5 stars
Christgau's Record Guide	C
Drowned in Sound	8/10
Head Heritage	favorable
Tom Hull	B

The End... was released in November 1974, on record label Island, her only album on the label. Despite strong reviews from some publications, like its predecessors, it was not a commercial success and Nico's partnership with Island ended.

Reviewing in Christgau's Record Guide: Rock Albums of the Seventies (1981), Robert Christgau wrote (partly in a faux German accent): "I don't know vy she's moaning about unved virgins and vether to betray her hate, and I don't vant to know. The Manzanera-Eno-Cale settings, which I believe is what one calls this sort of elevated sound effect, are suitably morbid and exotic. But funereal irony aside, her parlay of the Doors' 'The End' and the Fuehrer's 'Das Lied Der Deutschens' contextualizes both tunes more pejoratively than is intended. Nico is what happens when the bloodless wager their minds on the wisdom of the blood and the suicidal make something of their lives. If this be romanticism, give me Matthew Arnold—and gimme shelter."

== Track listing ==
All tracks are written by Nico, except where noted.

Side one
No.	Title	Length
1.	"It Has Not Taken Long"	4:12
2.	"Secret Side"	4:08
3.	"You Forget to Answer"	5:08
4.	"Innocent and Vain"	3:52
5.	"Valley of the Kings"	3:57

Side two
No.	Title	Writer(s)	Length
6.	"We've Got the Gold"		5:44
7.	"The End"	John Densmore, Robby Krieger, Ray Manzarek, Jim Morrison	9:37
8.	"Das Lied der Deutschen"	Hoffmann von Fallersleben, Joseph Haydn	5:29

2012 re-issue bonus disc
No.	Title	Length
1.	"Secret Side" (John Peel Session, February 20, 1971)	4:04
2.	"We've Got the Gold" (John Peel Session, December 3, 1974)	3:58
3.	"Janitor of Lunacy" (John Peel Session, December 3, 1974)	4:34
4.	"You Forget to Answer" (John Peel Session, December 3, 1974)	4:30
5.	"The End" (John Peel Session, December 3, 1974)	9:07
6.	"Secret Side" (The Old Grey Whistle Test, February 7, 1975)	4:07
7.	"Valley of the Kings" (The Old Grey Whistle Test, February 7, 1975)	3:35
8.	"Das Lied der Deutschen" (Rainbow Theatre live version, June 1, 1974)	5:36
9.	"The End" (Rainbow Theatre live version, June 1, 1974)	9:18

Note: The original CD edition of the album erroneously cuts off the song 'You Forget to Answer' about ten seconds early. The deluxe 2 CD remastered edition corrects this error.

== Personnel ==
- Nico – lead vocals, harmonium

Additional personnel

- John Cale – bass guitar, xylophone, acoustic guitar, synthesizers, organ, marimba, triangles, cabaça, boobams, glockenspiel, percussion, piano, electric piano, production
- Phil Manzanera – electric guitar on "The End"
- Brian Eno – synthesizers on "It Has Not Taken Long", "You Forgot to Answer" and "Innocent and Vain"
- Vicki Wood – backing vocals
- Annagh Wood – backing vocals

Technical

- John Wood – studio engineer
- Victor Gamm – studio engineer
