= Premana Premadi =

Indonesian astronomer

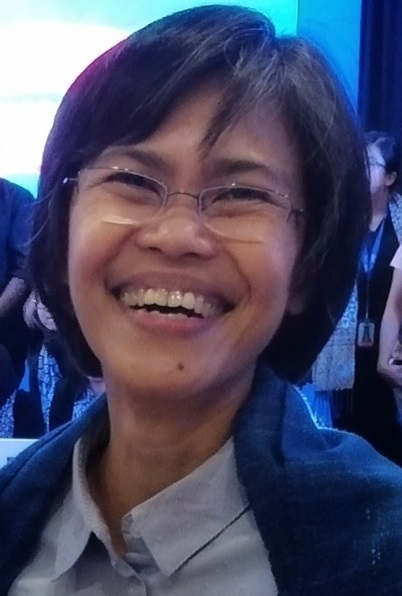
- Premadi in 2019
- Born: 13 July 1964 (age 62); Surabaya, East Java, Indonesia
- Education: Bandung Institute of Technology; University of Texas at Austin
- Scientific career
- Fields: Astronomy; astrophysics
- Workplaces: Bandung Institute of Technology; Bosscha Observatory
- Thesis: The study of light propagation in inhomogeneous universes using the gravitational lensing method (1996)
- Doctoral advisor: Richard Matzner

Premana Wardayanti Premadi (born 13 July 1964) is an Indonesian astronomer who is a professor at the Bandung Institute of Technology. She has been head of the Bosscha Observatory since 2018.

== Early life and education ==
Premadi was born in Surabaya, East Java on 13 July 1964. Her father Premadi was a surgeon and her mother Soewarni Premadi was a nurse. She briefly studied in Palembang for elementary school before continuing her studies in Jakarta. In an interview, Premadi stated that she was inspired to study astronomy by her high school teachers and from images sent by the Voyager program. She obtained a bachelor's degree in astronomy from the Bandung Institute of Technology in 1988, and later a doctorate from the University of Texas at Austin in 1996. She was the first Indonesian woman to receive a doctorate in astrophysics. According to Premadi, she was also the only woman and Asian studying astrophysics in Austin during her time. Her dissertation was titled, The Study of Light Propagation in Inhomogeneous Universes Using the Gravitational Lensing Method. Richard Matzner was Premadi's doctoral advisor and Hugo Martel mentored her. She was introduced to Matzner by Cécile DeWitt-Morette.

== Career ==
After completing her doctorate in Texas, she returned to Indonesia and began to lecture astronomy at ITB. She helped in the curricular development of astronomy there. She then became head of the Bosscha Observatory in Lembang, West Java in 2018. Under her leadership, the observatory focused on solar observations due to a lack of available equipment. She has also been involved in the construction of the Timau Observatory in Timor. She is also active in science outreach, creating the Indonesian branch of Universe Awareness in 2007 to teach astronomy to young children and chairing the organization until 2013.

Premadi was chairman of the Indonesian Astronomical Association between 2001 and 2010. She was made a professor in cosmic structure evolution at ITB in August 2023.

== Personal life ==
She is married to Yudi Soeharyadi, a lecturer in mathematics at ITB. In 2010, Premadi was diagnosed with ALS. She later founded the Indonesian ALS Foundation, and chairs the organization.

== Awards and honors ==
The main belt asteroid 12937 Premadi, discovered in 1960 by C. J. van Houten, was named in her honor in 2017. She was the first female astronomer in Indonesia to have an asteroid named in her honor. She was awarded an honorary fellowship of the Royal Astronomical Society in 2023.
