= Friedhelm Pedde =

German Near-Eastern archaeologist

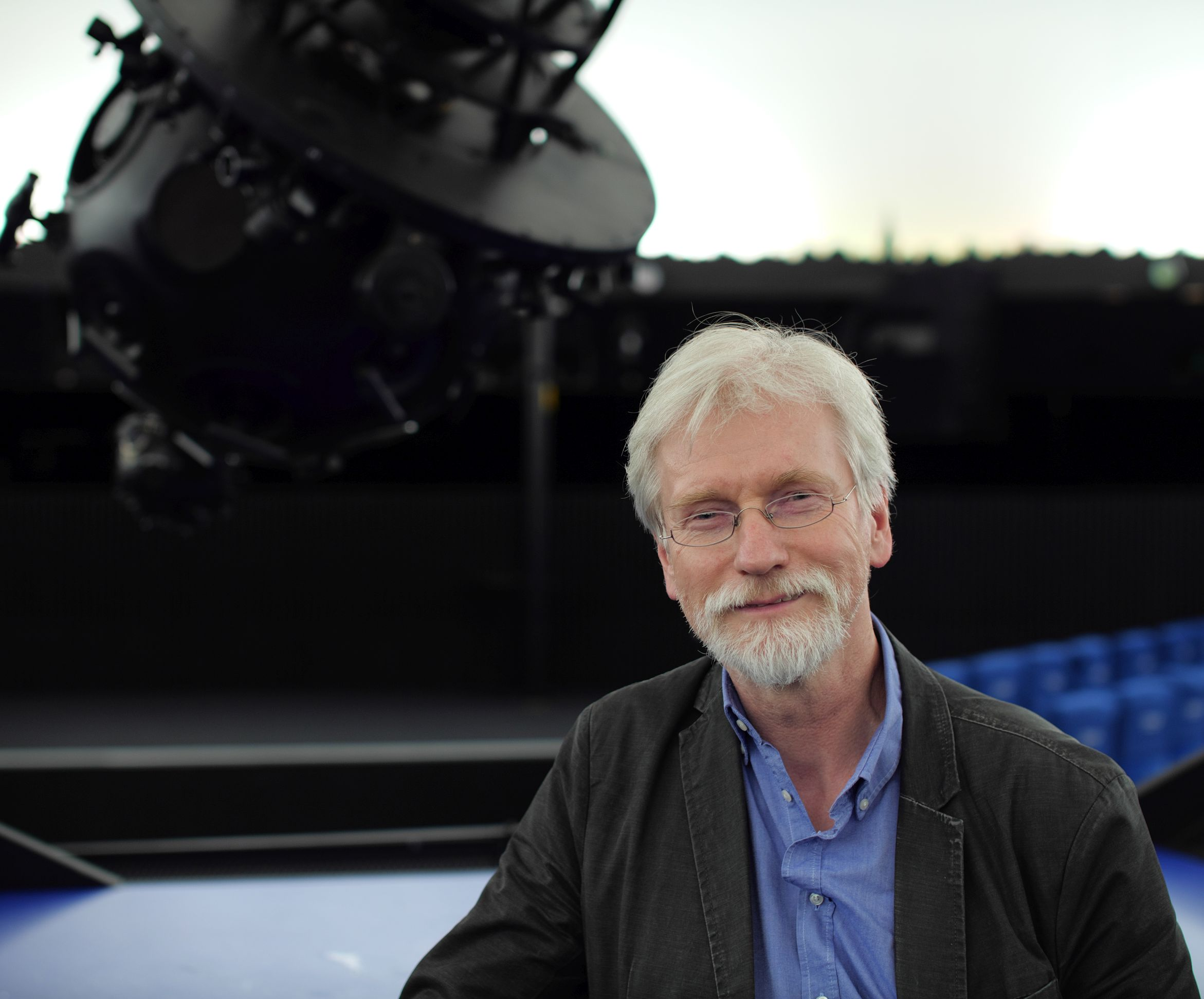
- Pedde in front of the planetarium projector of the Wilhelm Foerster Observatory in Berlin, 2023
- Born: 1953 (age 72–73); Schwerte, North Rhine-Westphalia, West Germany
- Spouse: Brigitte Wolfmuller (m. 1988)

Friedhelm Pedde (born 1953) is a German Ancient Near Eastern archaeologist. He is co-ordinator of the Assur Project in Berlin.

== Life ==
Friedhelm Pedde was an administrative employee at the city administration of Schwerte and completed his Abitur in Dortmund. He first studied at Münster, then at Free University of Berlin Near Eastern archaeology, Indian art history and Iranian studies. The subject of his master's thesis was "Ceramics from North Balochistan". He received his doctorate in Berlin under Hans J. Nissen with the topic Near Eastern Fibula. From Levant to Iran.

From 1987 to 1997, Pedde worked as a consultant and freelancer at the German Archaeological Institute in Berlin for the Uruk project. Since 1997 he has been coordinating the "Assur Project" of the German Oriental Society and the Vorderasiatisches Museum in Berlin. In the meantime, from 2011 to 2012, he was Associate Curator at the Metropolitan Museum of Art in New York, Department Ancient Near East.

Pedde's scientific focus is on the processing and publication of old excavations, in particular concerning the Iraqi sites Uruk/Warka and Assur. Here he is mainly concerned with architecture, metal objects and burials.

He has also studied the archaeological aspects of Karl May's work and deals with historical topics, cultural history and astronomy. Since 2021, he is the second chairman of the board of the Wilhelm Foerster Observatory association in Berlin-Schöneberg.

Pedde has been married to the art historian Brigitte Pedde, née Wolfmüller, since 1988.

== Selected publications ==
- with Margarethe van Ess: Uruk. Die Kleinfunde II. Ausgrabungen Uruk-Warka Endberichte 7, Mainz, 1992, ISBN 3-8053-1223-7
- Keramik aus Nord-Belutschistan: Die Sammlungen Noetling] und Henckmann im Museum für Indische Kunst, Staatliche Museen zu Berlin, Preußischer Kulturbesitz, Materialien zur Iranischen Archäologie, Band 1, Berlin 1993, ISBN 3-496-00440-1
- with Rainer Michael Boehmer und Beate Salje: Uruk. Die Gräber. Ausgrabungen Uruk-Warka Endberichte 10, Mainz 1995, ISBN 3-8053-1590-2
- with Marlies Heinz und Bernd Müller-Neuhof: Uruk. Die Kleinfunde IV. Metall- und Steinobjekte im Vorderasiatischen Museum zu Berlin. Ausgrabungen in Uruk-Warka Endberichte 21, Mainz, 2000, ISBN 3-8053-1899-5
- Vorderasiatische Fibeln. Von der Levante bis Iran, Abhandlungen der Deutschen Orient-Gesellschaft, Band 24, Saarbrücken, 2000, ISBN 3-930843-57-9
- with Steven Lundström: Der Alte Palast in Assur, in: Wissenschaftliche Veröffentlichungen der Deutschen Orient-Gesellschaft 120, Wiesbaden, 2008, ISBN 978-3-447-05727-1
- Die Gräber und Grüfte in Assur II: Die mittelassyrische Zeit, WVDOG 144, Wiesbaden, 2015, ISBN 978-3-447-10493-7
- Die Familie Pedde. 200 Jahre Geschichte, Selbstverlag, Berlin, 2017

=== As editor ===
- with Nathanael Shelley: Assyromania and More. In Memory of Samuel M. Paley, marru 4, Münster, 2018, ISBN 978-3-96327-038-3
- with Joachim Marzahn: Hauptsache Museum. Der Alte Orient im Fokus. Festschrift für Ralf-Bernhard Wartke, marru 6, Münster, 2018, ISBN 978-3-96327-036-9
