= Richard Matzner =

American physicist

- Education: University of Notre Dame; University of Maryland
- Known for: Binary Black Hole Grand Challenge Alliance
- Scientific career
- Fields: General relativity Numerical relativity Cosmology; Astrophysics
- Workplaces: University of Texas at Austin
- Doctoral advisor: Charles Misner
- Other academic advisors: John Wheeler
- Doctoral students: Benjamin Schumacher; Ignazio Ciufolini; Tony Rothman; Premana Premadi

Richard Alfred Matzner is an American physicist, working mostly in the field of general relativity and cosmology, including numerical relativity, kinetic theory, black hole physics, and gravitational radiation. He is Professor of Physics at the University of Texas at Austin where he directed the Center for Relativity. In 1993 he organized and was Lead Principal Investigator of an NSF/ARPA funded computational Grand Challenge program involving ten university teams seeking computational descriptions for the interaction of black holes as potential sources for observable gravitational radiation. His work leading what became known as the Binary Black Hole Grand Challenge Alliance featured in Kip Thorne's Nobel Prize lecture, including when Matzner and Alliance collaborators wagered Thorne that numerical relativity would produce a simulated waveform comparable to observation prior to the first LIGO detection. Matzner and colleagues eventually won, Thorne saying he "conceded the bet with great happiness."

== Education and career ==
Matzner received his Ph.D. from the University of Maryland in Physics in 1967, advised by Charles Misner. He concluded his graduate education with a year at the University of Cambridge. Matzner has advised and educated students in cosmology, relativity, and astrophysics. He was one of the first to calculate what a simplified, head-on collision between two black holes would look like, including the weak gravitational waves such a merger could emit. He was elected a Fellow of the American Physical Society in 1995 for "his analyses in general relativity of a wide range of astrophysical phenomena, especially his numerical simulations of strong-field gravitational systems and the gravitational radiation they produce." Matzner's research in theoretical questions includes topology and signature change in the early universe, and quantum gravity using the tool of path integration. His observational/experimental studies include tests of General Relativistic effects via laser-ranging to dense geodetic satellites. These experiments resulted in the first (and best as of 2023) measurement and confirmation of the Lens-Thirring frame-dragging effect, predicted by Einstein's theory of general relativity, to within 10 percent. Matzner is Co-I of the LARES (Laser Relativity Satellite) satellite team, the densest artificial satellite in orbit, launched in 2012, with a second satellite, LARES 2, launched in 2022.

== Policy, Outreach, & Diplomacy ==
Matzner served on advisory committees to the US Air Force, the National Science Foundation, the National Research Council, the European Space Agency, and the Department of Energy, such as the committee which determined relativity was needed for time transfer accuracy in satellite systems (GPS). He was on research assignment at Los Alamos National Laboratory, in the Institute for Geophysics and Planetary Physics, beginning a Dictionary of Geophysics, Astrophysics, and Astronomy. His science outreach activities include appointment to the Jefferson Science Fellows at the US Department of State, which placed Matzner as Senior Science Advisor in the East Asia and Pacific Bureau at the U.S. State Department. He advised on subjects including "Space and Cyber questions, Health, Environmental and Climate Change and its effect on the oceans, topics relating to Energy and to Scarce Material resources, on Innovation, and on Commercialization of academic research" and "contributed to and participated in meetings on space security in Vietnam and Malaysia, and on joint scientific commission meetings with Malaysia and Australia." Matzner participated on scientific editorial boards, served for a decade as Southwest Region Lead Judge for the Siemens/Westinghouse Science Competition, and co-directed international summer schools on Relativistic Astrophysics in Erice, Italy. His international collaborations and long-term visits include at institutes in Britain (University of Oxford), France, Germany (external advisory committee to the Max Planck Institute for Gravitational Physics), Turkey, and Italy (Aerospace Engineering Department at University of Rome on laser ranged satellites and relativistic astrophysics lecture series at the University in Lecce).

== Recognitions ==
- Fellow of the American Physical Society (1995)
- Foreign member of the Academy of Sciences of Turin
