= Wilhelm Foerster Observatory =

Public observatory in Berlin

Willhelm-Foerster-Sternwarte
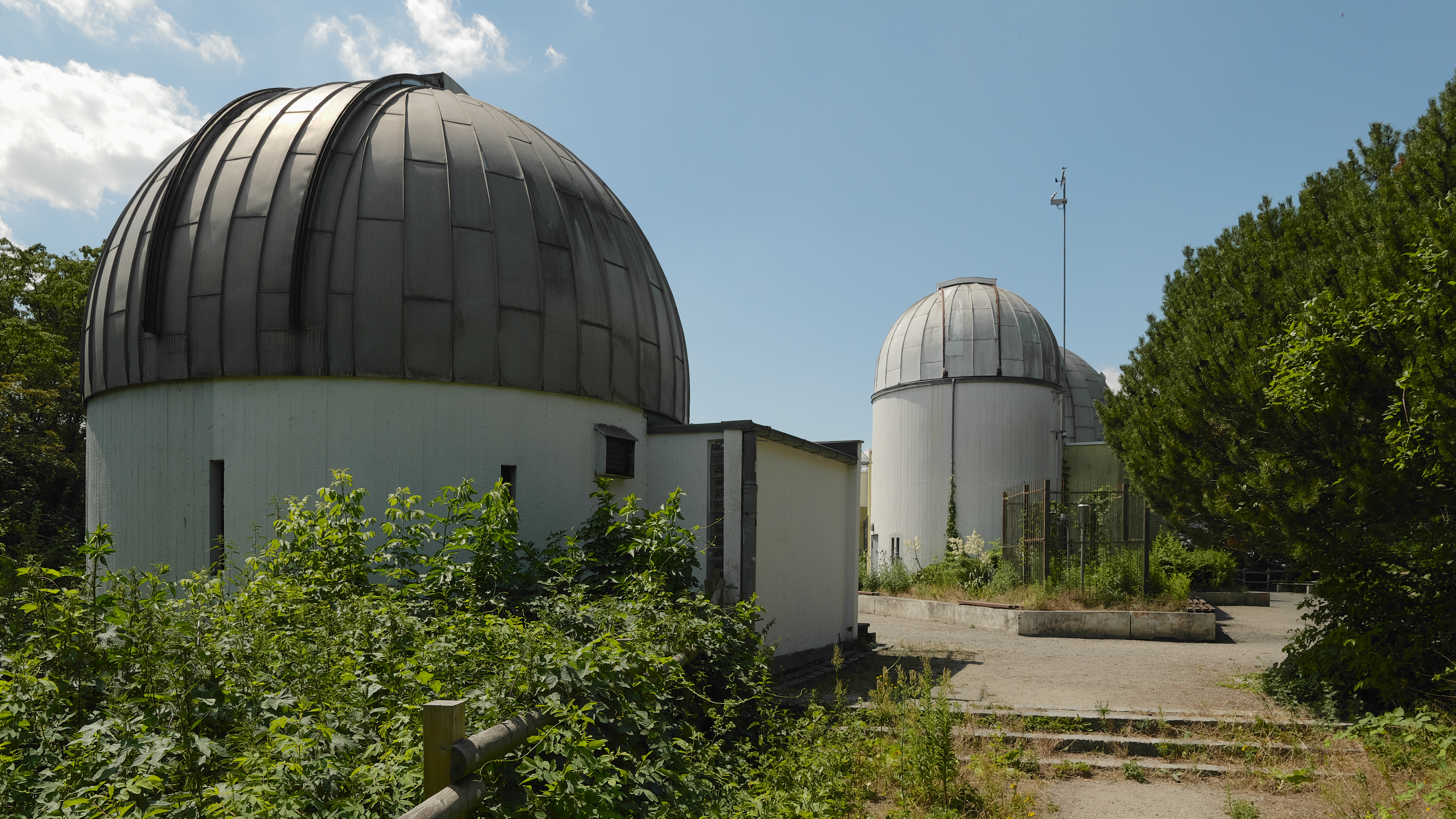
- Observatory code: 544
- Location: Schöneberg, Berlin, Germany
- Coordinates: 52°27′27″N 13°21′5″E
- Altitude: 78.4 m (257 ft)
- Established: 1965
- Website: www.wfs.de

Telescopes
- Bamberg-Refraktor: 32 cm (12.60 in)
- 32 cm (12.60 in)
- 32 cm (12.60 in)
- Related media on Commons

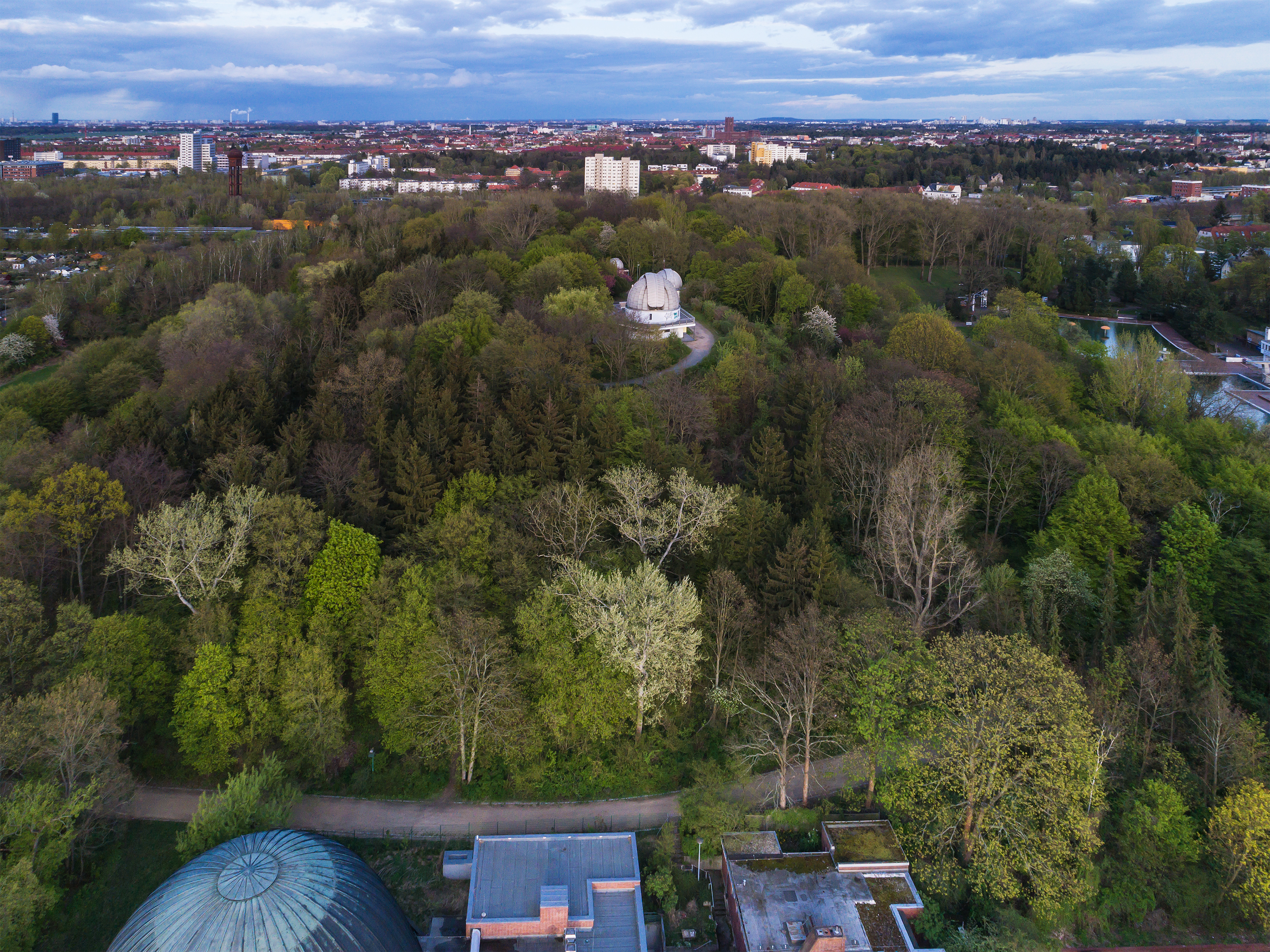
Air view of Planetarium am Insulaner (bottom) and Wilhelm-Foerster-Sternwarte (on the hill)

The Wilhelm Foerster Observatory in Berlin is a large public observatory which allows visitors to observe the sky through several telescopes. The facility is named after the German astronomer Wilhelm Foerster.

== Location ==
The listed building is located on the Insulaner hill, a mountain of post-World War II rubble in the Berlin quarter of Schöneberg in the district of Tempelhof-Schöneberg.

Slightly west at the foot of the Insulaner at Munsterdamm there are the Planetarium am Insulaner with a dome projection and an astronomical library. All facilities are managed by the Stiftung Planetarium Berlin, and such combination is unique in Europe.

== History ==
The history of the observatory can be read in an exhibition in the planetarium at the Insulaner.

=== Foundation and development years (1947–1970) ===
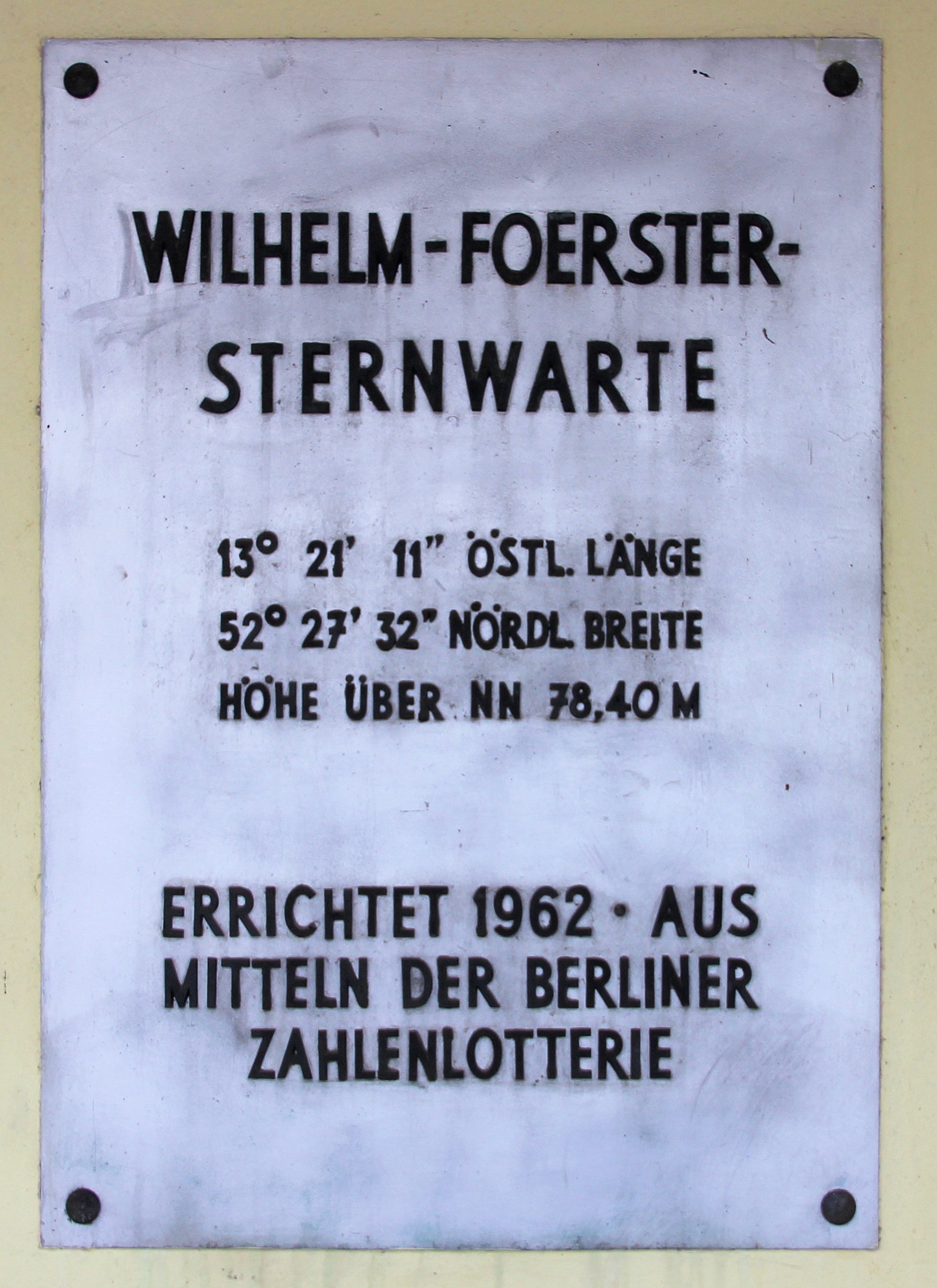
Memorial plaque at the house Munsterdamm 86, in Berlin-Steglitz

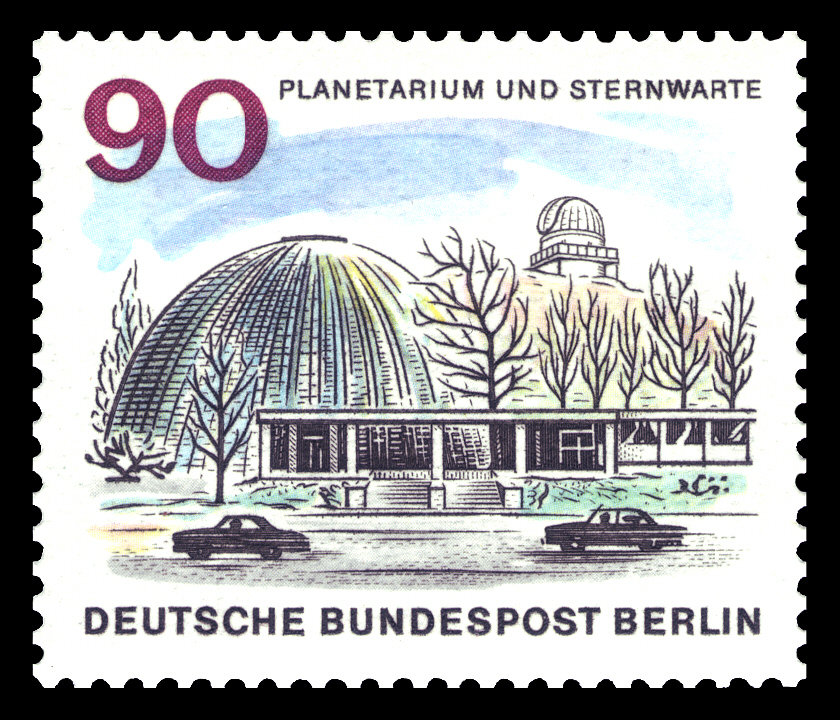
Special postage stamp of 1965

On October 15, 1947, Hans Mühle and Hans Rechlin founded the Wilhelm Foerster Institute (Berlin South Observatory). The official founding is considered to be the granting of the trade license by the Allied Commandant's Office. The naming Wilhelm-Foerster-Institut goes back to Richard Sommer. He was a student of Wilhelm Foerster and long-time director of the planetarium at Berlin Zoologischer Garten station and at the Archenhold Observatory in Berlin-Treptow.

The first location of the observatory was the casino of the former general command in the ruins of General-Pape-Strasse 2 in Schöneberg. After the rubble had been removed, the half-ruin could be equipped with a lecture room for about 40 people, an office with library, a workshop, a photo laboratory and two observing platforms. Soon, the first school classes were given lectures and guided tours. Observations were made with home-made 7- and 8-inch telescopes.

In October 1949, the astronomical working group of the Archenhold Observatory and the astronomy courses of the Volkshochschule Tempelhof were moved to the Wilhelm Foerster Institute. In January 1951, the damaged Bamberg-Refraktor in the destroyed Urania building in Invalidenstraße could be dismantled and moved to General-Pape-Straße.

On June 8, 1953 the present association Wilhelm-Foerster-Sternwarte was founded. The institute was thereby transferred to the association. In 1955 the Bamberg refractor was installed there, a general overhaul by the company Askania in Berlin-Mariendorf, took place in 1962. In November 1961 the laying of the cornerstone of the new observatory on the Insulaner took place. On January 30, 1963 the opening of the observatory in the new building took place. The 12-inch Bamberg refractor stands in the eleven-meter dome, the 6-inch double refractor (Zeiss-B Apochromat + Busch) in the five-meter dome, and a 7-inch telescope on the platform. This made the observatory the largest public observatory in the Federal Republic of Germany.

After the laying of the cornerstone of the Zeiss Planetarium on November 15, 1963, the opening of the observatory took place on June 16, 1965. In 1966, the Bamberg refractor got a mobile observation staircase.

Between 1967 and 1968, the 6-inch double refractor with Zeiss B objective was completely rebuilt (frequency-controlled drive, later conversion to stepper motors).

Since 1969, the observatory was home to the satellite observatory of Technische Universität Berlin, from which, among other things, radio communication could be established with TUBSAT-A, which was launched on July 17, 1991.

=== Extension of the observatory (1970–1990) ===
In 1971, a 75-cm aluminum mirror with 5780 mm focal length was taken on loan from the Milan Observatory. In 1973, the dismountable 75-cm reflecting telescope was built entirely of aluminum. The entire instrument has a weight of only 360 kg and is transportable. Among other things, it was used on a solar eclipse excursion to Mauritania on June 30 1973.

Beginning in August 1972, construction of a separate building with a seven-meter dome began on the Insulaner. On November 9, 1973, the 75-cm mirror was unveiled on the occasion of a visit by Federal President Gustav Heinemann was officially inaugurated.

From 1973 to 1986, broadcast journalist and space expert Harro Zimmer served as a board member of the association. He was one of its founding members and participated in the US Moonwatch program in a leading position in the observations of satellite orbits.

The Berlin astronomer and university lecturer Fritz Hinderer held numerous practical courses for his students in the 1980s with the help of the association's technical facilities.

Starting in 1982, a special solar telescope was built. This is located on the roof of the planetarium annex. It is used for projection of the solar image onto the planetarium dome. The instrument was put into operation in 1988.

The astrophysicist Erwin Sedlmayr was a member of the advisory board of the board of directors of the Wilhelm Foerster Observatory, of which he was later appointed honorary member. Since the 1980s, many of his students have been trained at the technical facilities of the planetarium and observatory.

A fire on May 10, 1988 destroyed the copper roof and seating of the planetarium dome. The technical equipment was saved to safety. In November 1988, repair work of the fire damage was completed.

On December 15, 1990, the handover of the Ritchey-Chrétien Telescope (RCT) took place. In September 1996, a general overhaul of the Bamberg refractor began by the 4H-Jena engineering company. The rededication of the restored refractor took place on August 30, 1997. A cable fire destroyed the image processing equipment in the mirror dome of the observatory on August 18, 1996.

On October 22, 1997 the WFS celebrated its 50th anniversary. Since July 1, 2016 the observatory belongs to the Stiftung Planetarium Berlin.

== Instruments ==
Many of the technical achievements could also be purchased or repaired thanks to support from Deutsche Klassenlotterie Berlin, which, in addition to funding from the Berlin government and income from membership fees and visitor fees, makes up an important part of the financing.

=== Bamberg-Refraktor ===
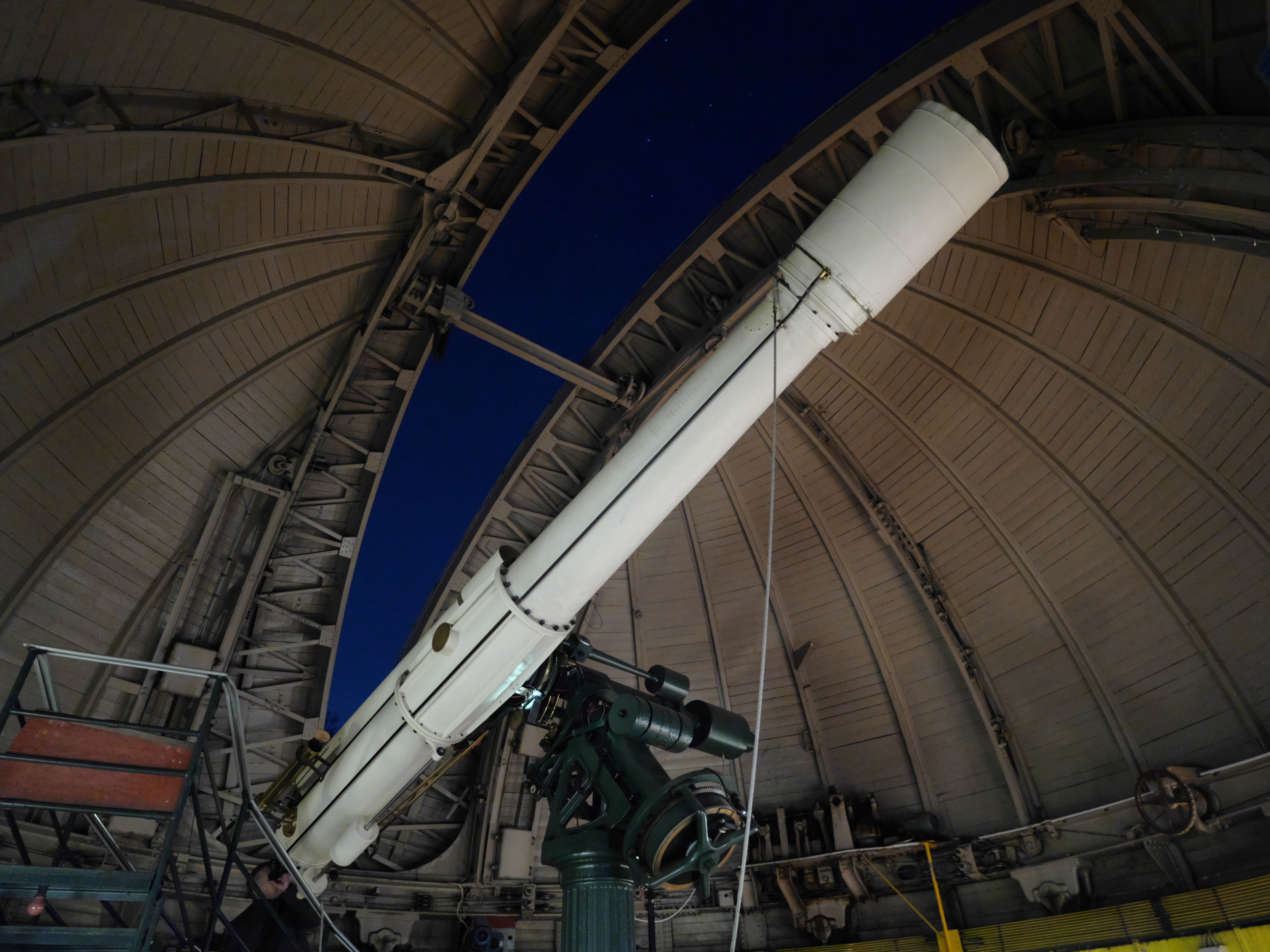
Bamberg refractor

The Bamberg refractor was built in 1889 by the Carl Bamberg company in Berlin-Friedenau for the Berlin Urania. With its aperture of 320 mm and a focal length of 5000 mm, it was the largest telescope in Kingdom of Prussia at that time. The complete telescope with its mount has a weight of 4.5 tons. After World War II, the instrument was first placed in General-Pape-Straße, before it was placed in the 11-meter dome of the observatory on the Insulaner in 1963.

It was also used to obtain the images for the "Berlin Lunar Atlas."

=== 6-inch double refractor ===
The 6-inch double refractor is located in the five-meter dome. The main tubes have a three-lens, apochromates Zeiss B objective, and a three-lens HAB objective (half apochromat by Wolfgang Busch). The focal length in each case is 2250 mm.

A 5-inch refractor is mounted parallel to the 6-inch double refractor. This is equipped with a Lyot filter (switchable between 0.5 and 0.7 Å bandwidth, manufactured by the company B. Halle Nachfolger in Berlin-Steglitz) for solar observation in the light of the hydrogen spectral line.

=== 75-centimeter RCT mirror ===
The Ritchey–Chrétien telescope has a free aperture of 700 mm and a variable focal length of 5,600 to 10,500 mm. This Zeiss instrument is computer-controlled and is the fastest telescope in Berlin.

== Public relations ==
The association "Wilhelm-Foerster-Sternwarte" is to maintain and promote astronomy in Berlin. It is its task to impart astronomical knowledge to interested people.

The association is publishing the magazine "Dem Himmel nahe" (translated "Close to Heaven") several times a year since 2018.

For the public, events for all age groups are offered in the regular guided tour program. From guided tours for kindergartens and schools to observations of the sun and bright objects during the day and presentations of the current night sky to special thematic tours following the planetarium programs, the visitor is offered a wide range of instruments used and objects observed.

On special astronomical events such as eclipses or planetary transits, there are also opportunities to use the observatory. For example, in 2004 the transit of Venus could be observed, and a year earlier the transit of Mercury could be seen.

Courses are also offered in the seminar room for beginners, advanced students, and those interested in special areas of astronomy such as the theory of relativity are offered.

The activities within the different working groups cover wide parts of astronomy.
