= Bamberg-Refraktor =

Telescope in the Wilhelm Foerster Observatory

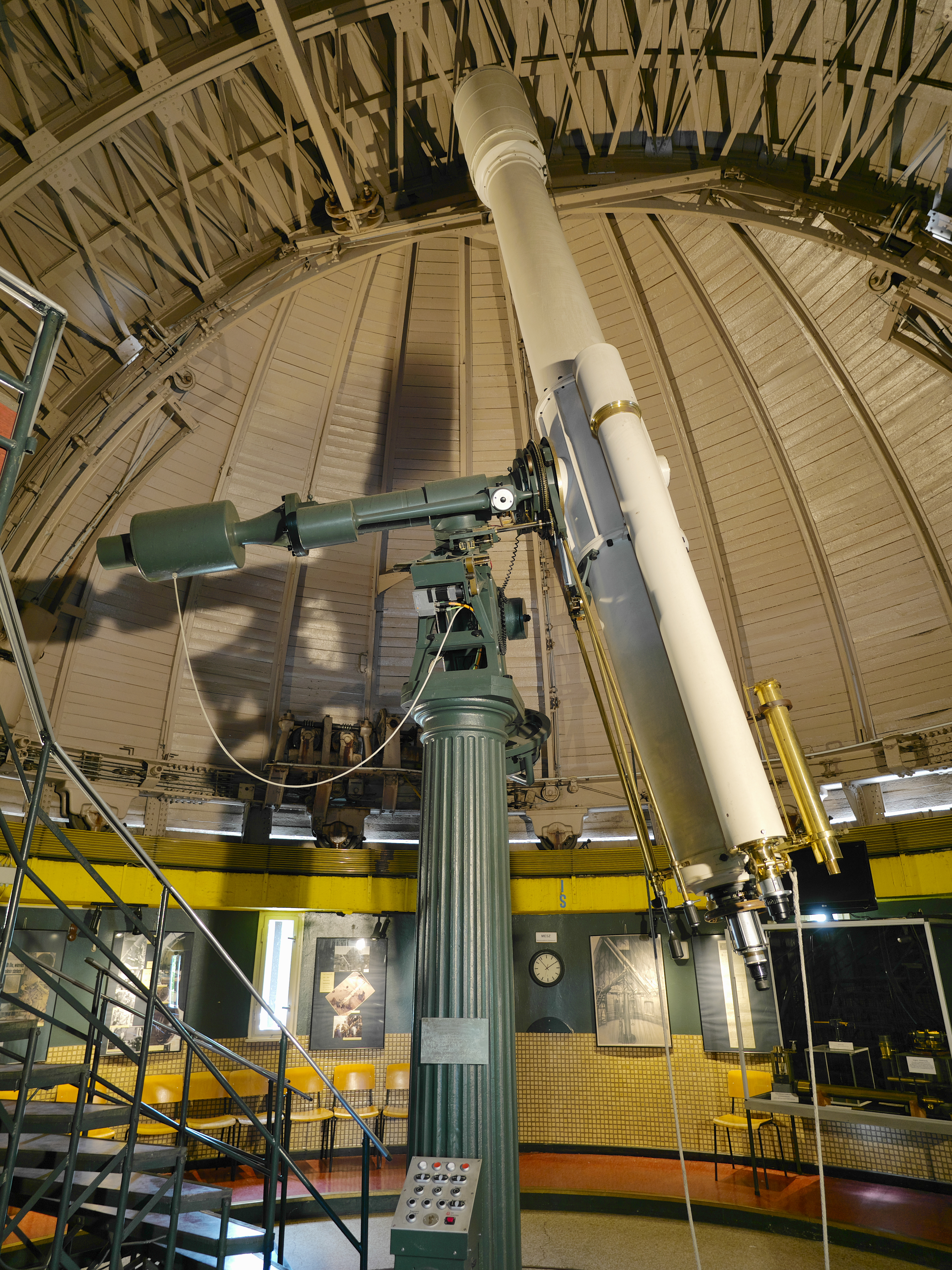
- Location: Insulaner, Schöneberg, Tempelhof-Schöneberg, Berlin, Germany
- Coordinates: 52°27′27″N 13°21′04″E
- Mass: 4,500 kg (9,900 lb)
- Focal length: 5,000 mm (16 ft 5 in)
- Website: wfs.berlin/instrumente/
- Location within Germany
- Related media on Commons

The Bamberg-Refraktor is a large refracting telescope (aperture of 320 millimetres, focal length of five metres) is located in the Wilhelm Foerster Observatory in the Berlin district of Schöneberg.

The name "Bamberg" goes back to the builder of the telescope, Carl Bamberg (* 12. Juli 1847 in Kranichfeld; † 4. Juni 1892 in Friedenau), and the term "refractor" (Latin re = 'back' and frangere = 'refract') means that the telescope is made exclusively with light-refracting optical lenses and does not use mirrors or zone plates.

== History ==
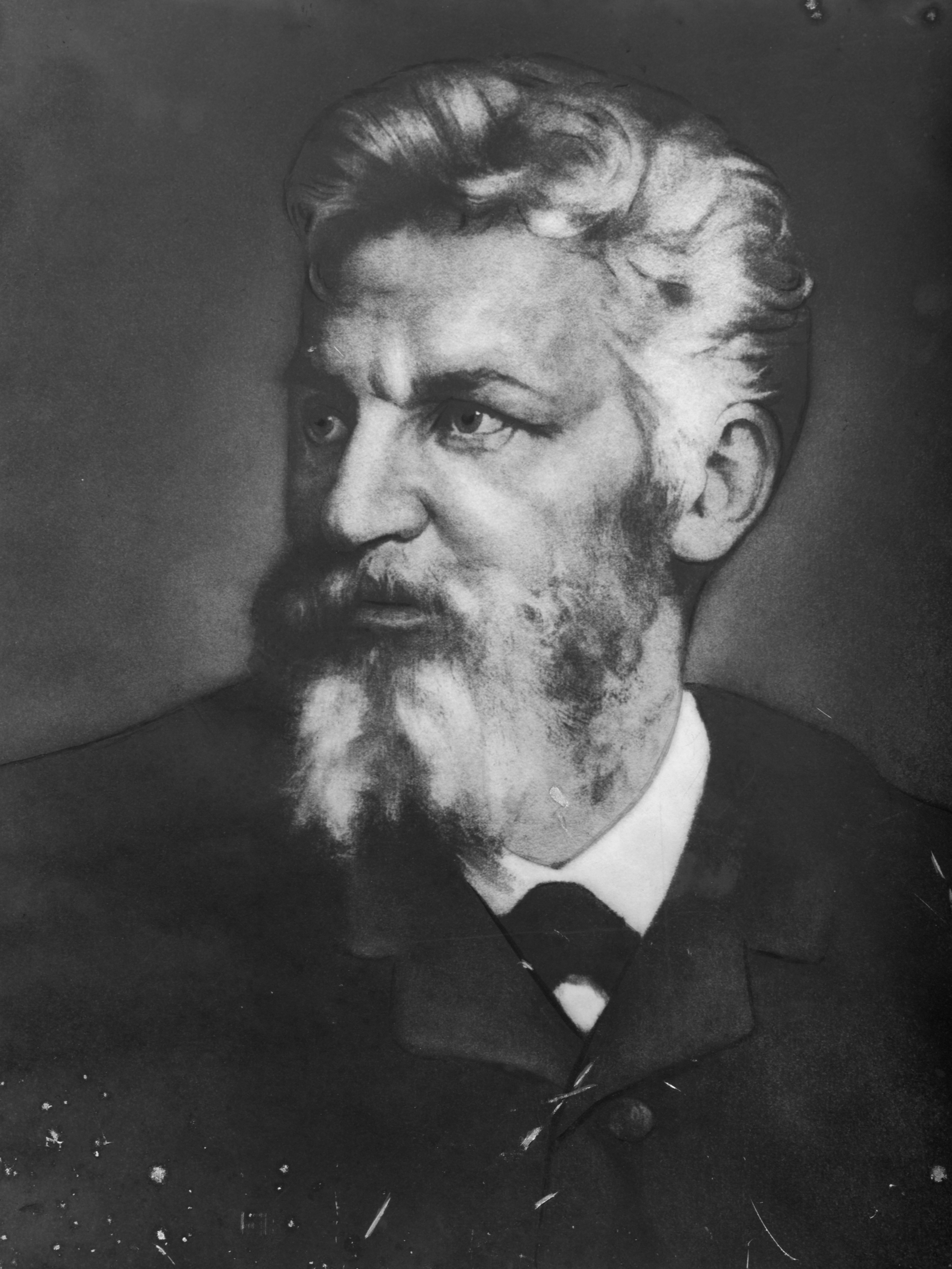
Carl Bamberg around 1890, photography of Wilhelm-Foerster-Sternwarte

The 12-Zoll-telescope was built in 1889 in the Berlin workshops of Carl Bamberg in Friedenauer Bundesallee in Berlin, was at the time the largest telescope in the Kingdom of Prussia and the second largest in the German Empire after the refractor at the Observatoire de Strasbourg. It was characterised by careful manufacture, a large focal length and modern control technology. An electric clock was used for the largely automatic tracking of the telescope according to the hour angle of the object to be observed. The lenses were made of high-quality glass from the Glastechnisches Laboratorium Schott & Genossen in Jena. The total cost was 50,000 Mark, which corresponded to 250 kilograms of silver (Note: This amount of silver corresponds to a good 8,000 fine ounces with a market value (as of 2018/2019) of a good 100,000 euros).

Initially, it was not only available for research purposes, but primarily for the public in the observatory of the Urania on Invalidenstraße in Berlin, which was equipped with an electrically operated dome. Among the first astronomers working there were Friedrich Simon Archenhold and the co-founder of the Urania Wilhelm Foerster. With the refractor, the astronomer Gustav Witt discovered the asteroids (422) Berolina and (433) Eros in 1896 and 1898. The polar explorer Alfred Wegener, who was trained as an astronomer, also used the Bamberg refractor in the Urania.

During the Second World War, the building was severely damaged, but the glass lenses remained undamaged. The telescope was salvaged in 1951 and was repaired by the Askania workhouses in Berlin-Mariendorf. In 1955, it was set up as the largest operable telescope in Berlin on the grounds of the observatory of the Wilhelm Foerster Institute in General-Pape-Straße in Berlin, which had been built up since 1947 in the half-ruin of a former officers' mess by the two Berlin amateur astronomers Hans Rechlin and Hans Mühle and transferred to the Wilhelm-Foerster-Sternwarte Association in June 1953. The Bamberg-Refraktor was also used there for public demonstrations, but also for training astronomers. However, the light pollution from the nearby railway facilities at Südkreuz proved unfavourable for night sky observations, so a new location was sought.

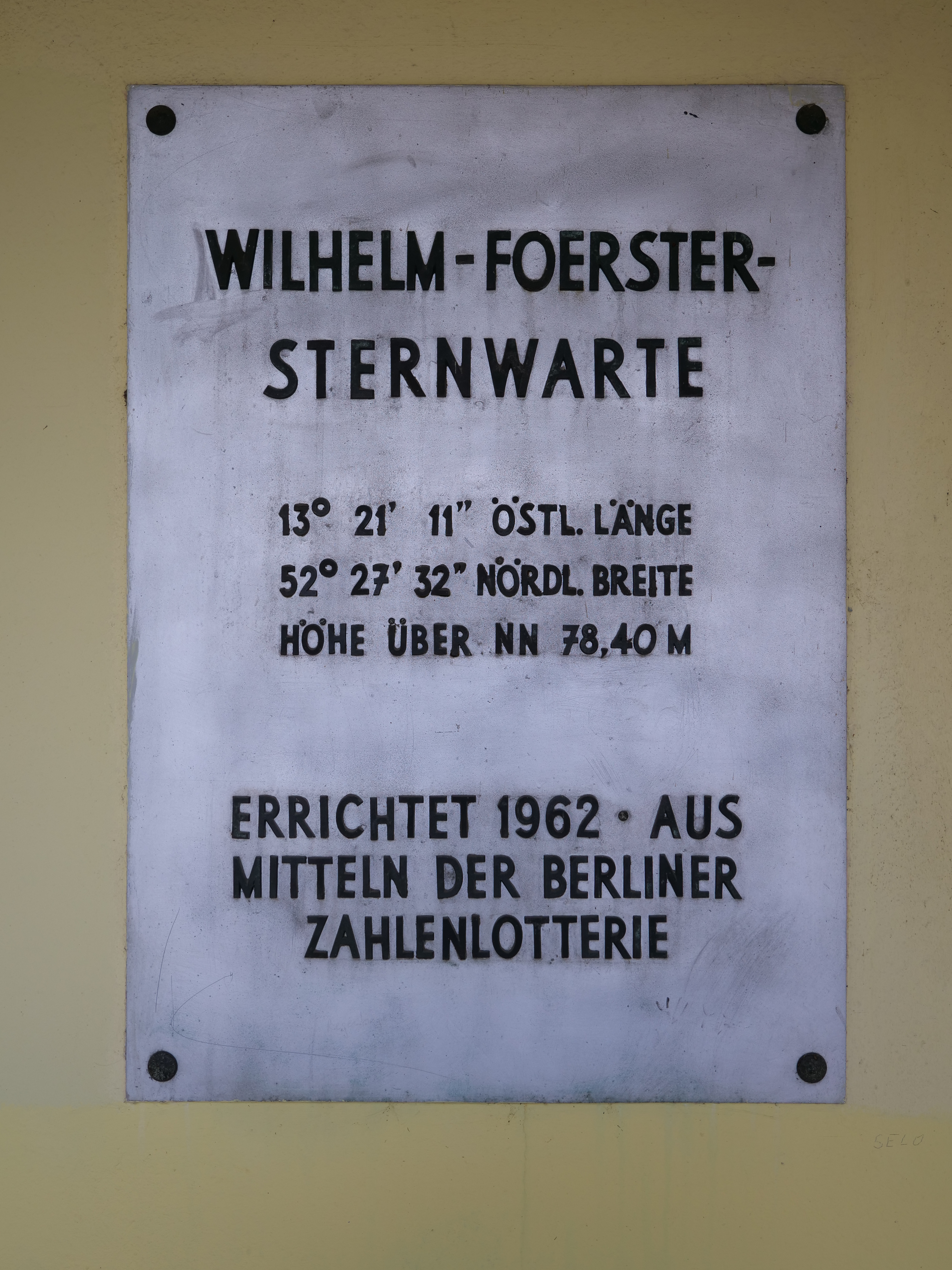
Commemorative plaque to the right of the observatory's main entrance

In November 1961, the foundation stone was laid for the Wilhelm Foerster Observatory built with funds from the Deutsche Klassenlotterie Berlin on the Insulaner in Berlin-Schöneberg, which was piled up after the war as a mountain of rubble to a height of a good 78 metres. In 1962, Askania in Berlin-Mariendorf carried out a general overhaul of the telescope, and since the opening of the Wilhelm Foerster Observatory on 30 January 1963, the refractor in the largest dome of the public observatory has been the most important and frequently used instrument for demonstrations by the society. The movable dome with a diameter of eleven metres dates from 1905. It was no longer needed at the Berlin Zeiss-Ikon factories in Berlin-Friedenau and was given to the observatory.

Using the Bamberg-Refraktor, Adolf Voigt and Hans Giebler of the Berlin Lunar Observers Group made the roll film images for the Berlin Lunar Atlas from 1964 to 1969, which have since been made available as a digitisation. Today, the large refractor is mainly used for public demonstrations.

In 1996 and 1997 the Bamberg refractor was overhauled by Gebhard Kühn at Zeiss in Jena, and in 2020, it was equipped with a new electrically controlled tracking by the company 4H Jena-Engineering.

In addition to the refractor in Rathenow, the great refractor in Potsdam and the great refractor of the Archenhold Observatory in Treptow, the Bamberg-Refraktor is still one of the large telescopes in the Berlin area. It is the oldest functioning large telescope with lenses in Europe.

== Engineering ==
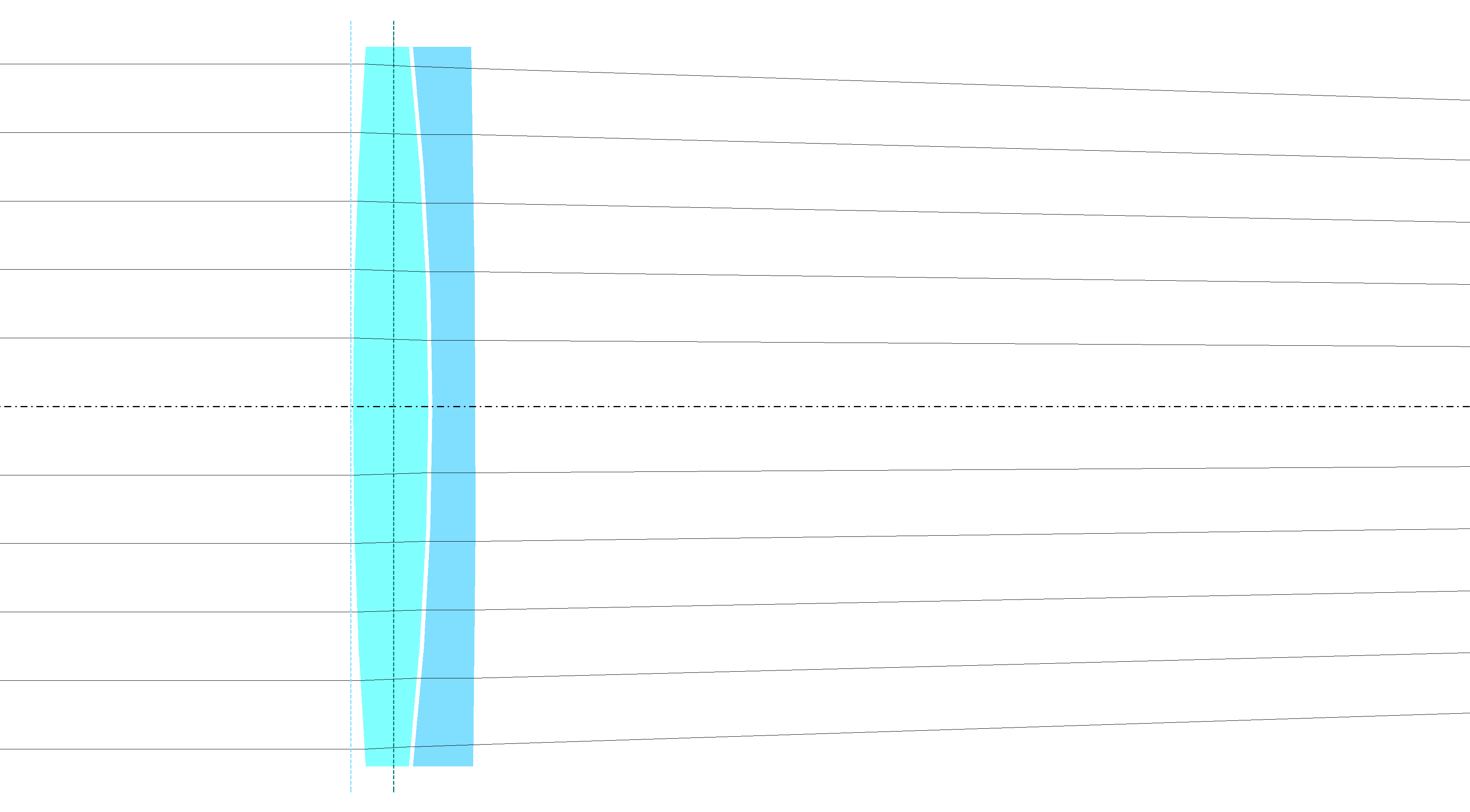
The optical path of the achromatic objective of the Bamberg-Refraktor with one lens each of crown glass (left) and flint glass (right) with the two corresponding principal planes

The Bamberg Refractor was designed according to the principle of the Kepler telescope with an optical corrected lens system constructed with spherically ground lenses of flint and crown glass. By combining the two glass types with different dispersion, the lens is achromatic, so that the blue and red light components have almost the same back focal length, which is, however, slightly larger than the cut width in the green. The glasses are ordinary silicate glasses from Schott, which were, however, processed very elaborately and with particular care so that they could solidify stress-free and optically pure from the melt. The two lenses that are not cemented together have the following parameters:

Lenses of the Bamberg-Refraktor
Glass	Schott- glas number	refractive index at wavelength 589 nm	Abbe number	shape	object side radius in mm	image side radius in mm
crown glass	0540	1,52	58,6	biconvex	2468,5	1621,7
flint glass	0516	1,62	36,4	concave-convex	1661,3	14579,7

From the aperture width

$D = 320 \text { mm}$

and the focal length

$$f = 5000 \text { mm}$$

results in a lens speed of just under 16 and an aperture ratio of a good 1/16 respectively:

$$k = \frac {f} {D} \approx 15.6$$

The image-side angular aperture is:

$$\omega_b = 2 \cdot \arctan {\frac {D} {2 \cdot f}} \approx 3.7^\circ$$

The spherical aberration is not corrected. The diameter $d_B$ of the Airy disc in the image plane at a wavelength $\lambda$ of 550 nanometres in the green by the diffraction limit is:

$$d_B(550 \text { nm}) \approx 2.44 \cdot \lambda \cdot k \approx 21 \text { μm}$$

Thus, the optical resolution of the Bamberg-Refraktor, limited by diffraction and given as the smallest angle $\delta$ between two stars still to be distinguished, is:

$$\delta \approx \arcsin {\left( 1.22 \frac {\lambda} {D} \right)} \approx {0,00012}^\circ \approx 0,0072 ' \approx 0.43''$$

This gives a maximum number of resolvable line pairs $N_L$ along the image circle diameter $B$ in the image plane of the telescope of:

$$N_L(\lambda) = \frac {N_P} {2} \approx \frac {B} {2,44 \cdot \lambda \cdot k} = \frac {B} {d_B(\lambda)}$$

Thus, for the wavelength in the green, it follows:

$$N_L(550 \text { nm}) = \frac {B} {d_B(550 \text { nm})} = \frac {B} {0.021 \text { mm}}$$.

This results in a maximum spatial frequency of just under 48 line pairs per millimetre in the image plane, and for an image circle diameter of 21 millimetres in the eyepiece, this results in a maximum spatial frequency of 1000 line pairs per image circle diameter.

The light intensity is sufficient to observe objects up to more than 14th apparent magnitude. Depending on the eyepiece used, the telescope is usually operated with magnifications of 70x to 700x.

With telescope mount and balance weight, the instrument weighs four and a half tonnes. It is balanced in such a way that it can be moved by hand without motors.

== Miscellaneous ==
The telescope of the Bosscha Observatory in Indonesia, also called the Bamberg-Refraktor, has a focal length of seven metres, a diameter of 370 millimetres (lens speed = 19) and was first commissioned in 1927 in Berlin. The comparatively large and thin lenses of this long-focal-length telescope cause an optically detectable deformation of the lenses when the telescope changes position, due to their own weight.

== Gallery ==
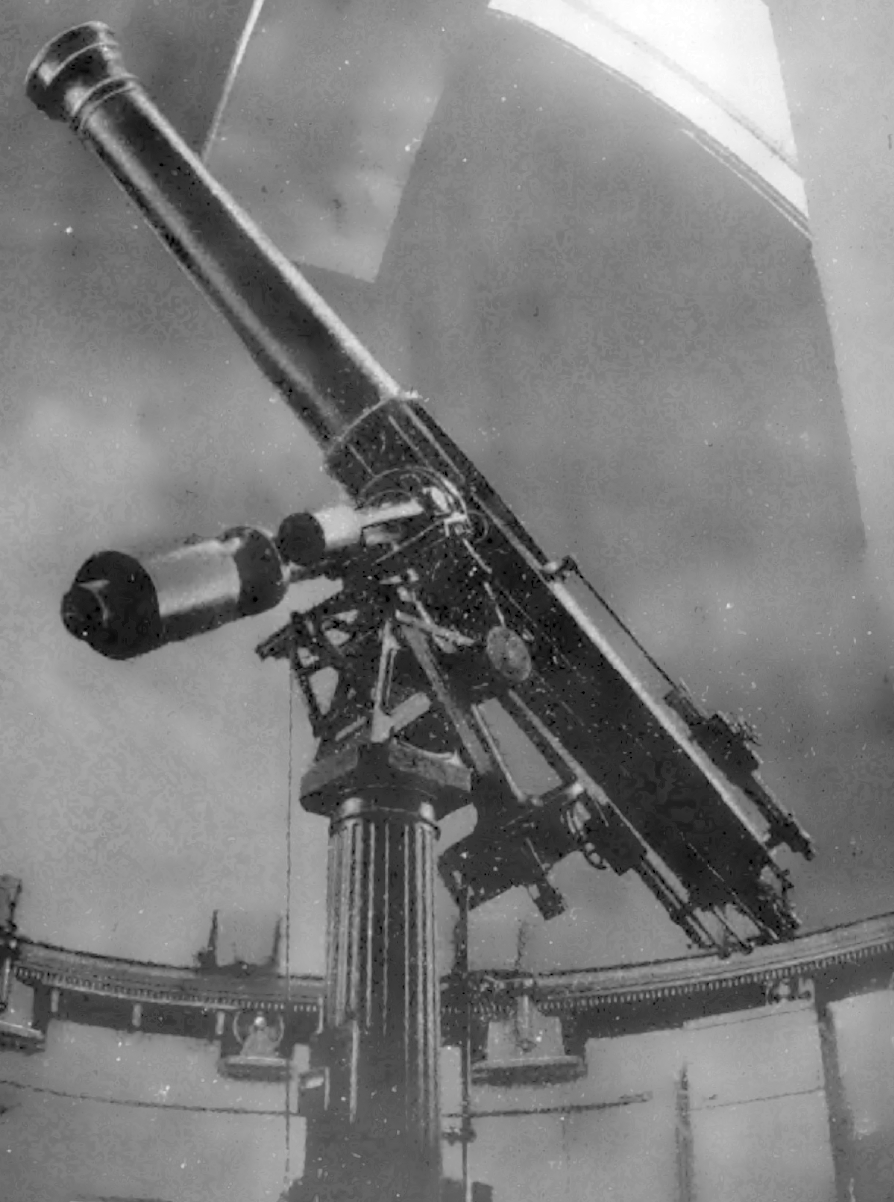
Bamberg-Refraktor 1889 at Urania Observatory in Berlin

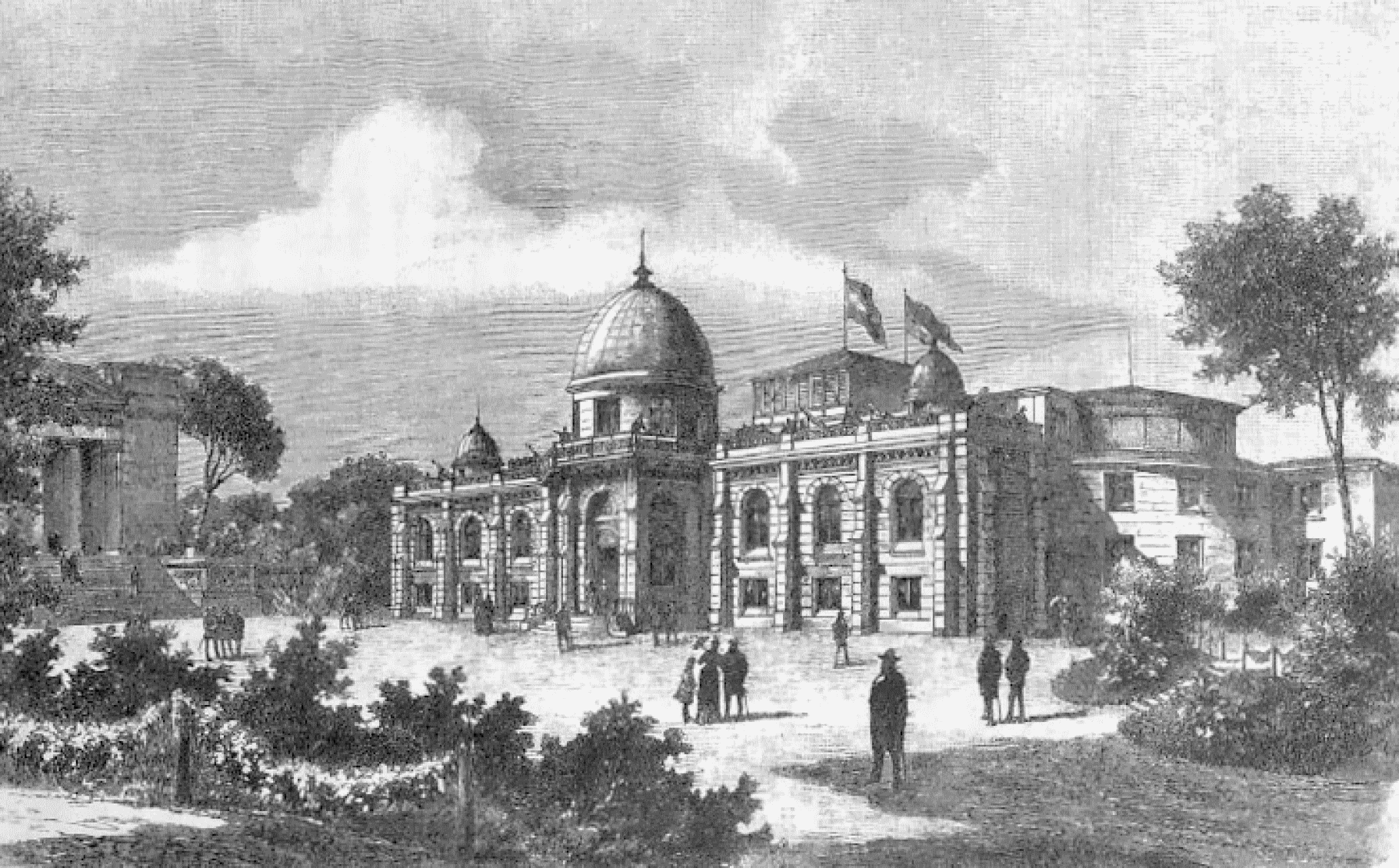
Urania Observatory in Berlin, the Bamberg-Refraktor was located in the large dome in the middle of the building

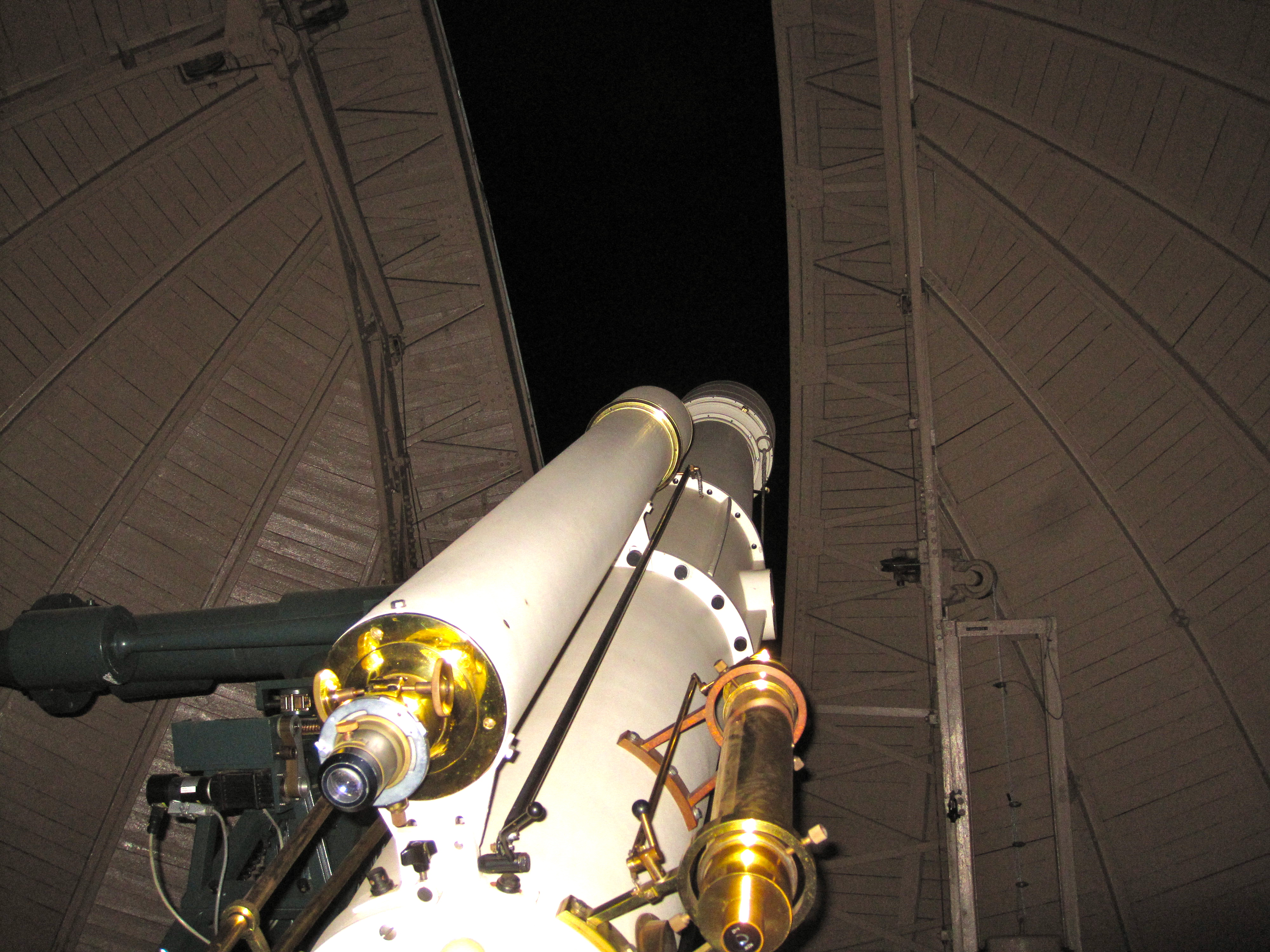
Bamberg-Refraktor 2010 at Wilhelm Foerster Observatory in Berlin

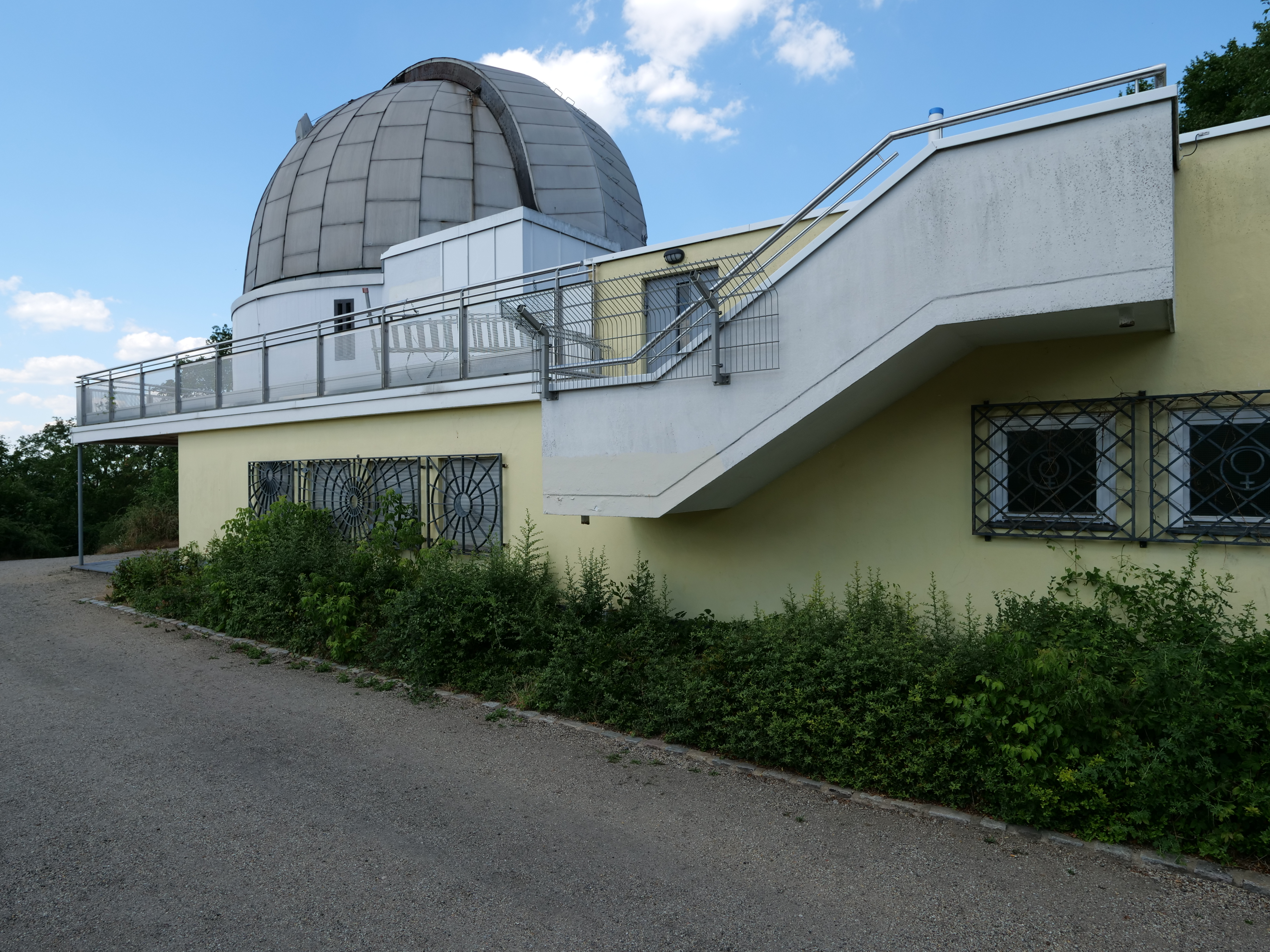
Great dome of Wilhelm Foerster Observatory on Insulaner hill

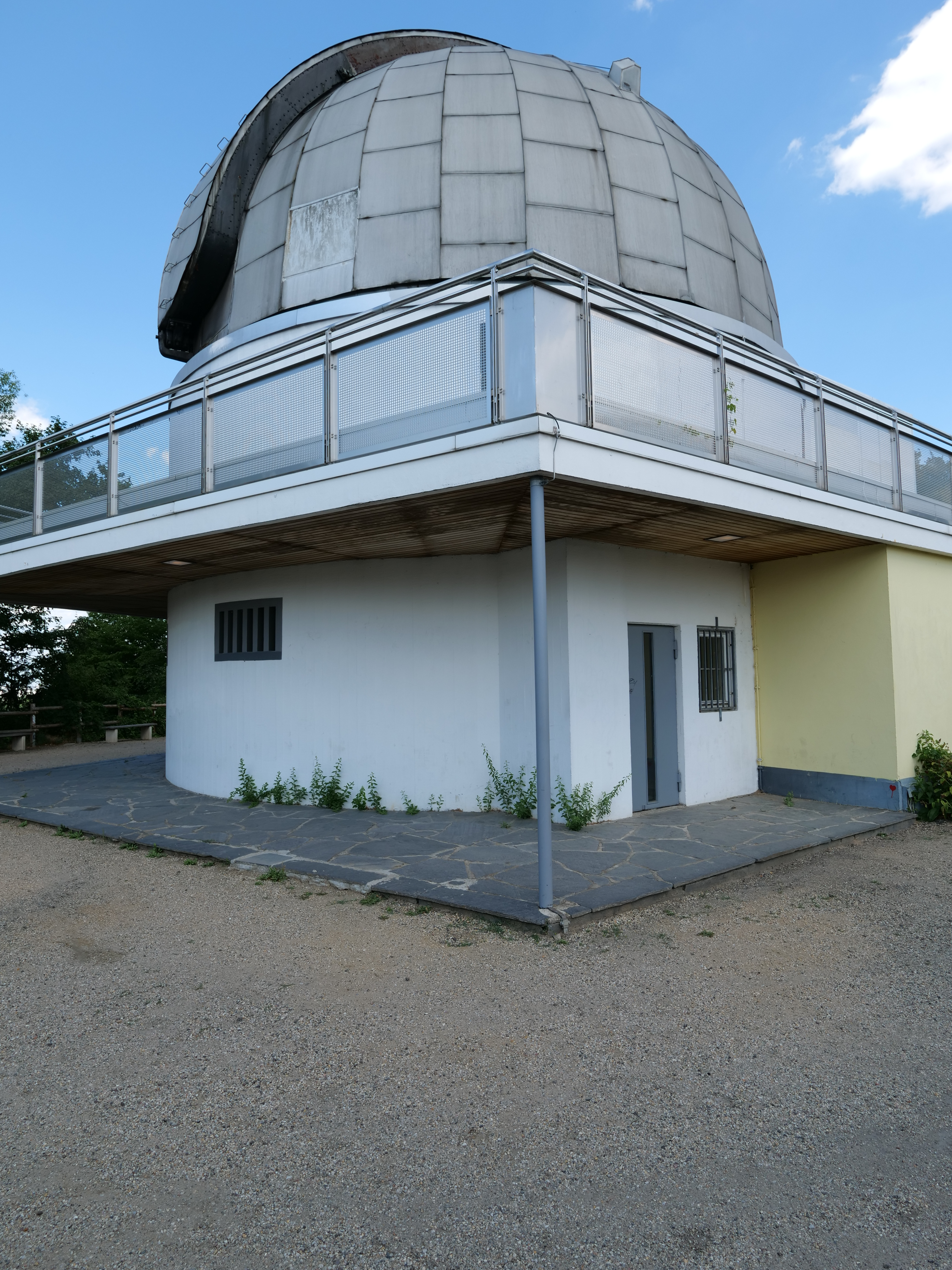
Dome building of the observatory for the Bamberg-Refraktor

== Sources ==
- Dieter B. Herrmann, Karl Friedrich Hoffmann: Die Geschichte der Astronomie in Berlin. ISBN 3-86021-018-1.
- C. Fröhlich: Der große Bamberg-Refraktor der neuen Berliner Sternwarte. Askania-Warte, Band 20.
- Ole Fass: Neue Zeit zum Anfassen – Wilhelm Julius Foerster (1832–1921). In: Daniel Klink, Martin Mahn (Hrsg.): Humboldts Innovationen – soziales, wissenschaftliches und wirtschaftliches Unternehmertum an der Humboldt-Universität zu Berlin. Vergangenheitsverlag, 2010, ISBN 978-3-940621-16-0.
- H. Homann: Wie der Zwölfzöller der Urania entstand. In: Himmel und Erde. Illustrierte naturwissenschaftliche Monatsschrift, VII. Jahrgang, Herausgegeben von der Gesellschaft Urania zu Berlin. Verlag Hermann Paetel, 1895. (google.de)
- Gudrun Wolfschmidt: 100 Jahre Carl Bamberg (1847–1892) – Optiker und Feinmechaniker, Katalog zur Ausstellung in der Wilhelm-Foerster-Sternwarte ab Juni 1992. Wilhelm-Foerster-Sternwarte Berlin, Nr. 68, 1992.
- Markus Bautsch (2023-05-01). "Was kann der Bamberg-Refraktor - Mitteilungen der Wilhelm-Foerster-Sternwarte e.V." (PDF). Dem Himmel nahe. (in German). Vol. 17. Berlin: Wilhelm-Foerster-Sternwarte e.V. / Zeiss-Planetarium am Insulaner. pp. 19–21. ISSN 2940-9330.
