= Ignazio Ciufolini =

Italian physicist

Ignazio Ciufolini (born 1951) is an Italian physicist active in the field of gravitational physics and general relativity.

== Biography ==
Ignazio Ciufolini graduated magna cum laude in 1980 at Sapienza University of Rome, and received a PhD in physics in 1984 at the University of Texas at Austin under the supervision of Richard Matzner.

From 1982 to 1988, he worked at University of Texas at Austin as a teaching assistant, lecturer and research associate. As of 2014, he is an associate professor of general physics at University of Salento (Italy), tenured since 1999, and a member of Centro Fermi, Rome. He collaborated with John Archibald Wheeler in 1995 to write Gravitation and Inertia, for which they won the PROSE Award for the best professional and scholar book in physics and astronomy. He works mainly in the field of General Relativity and Gravitational Physics, proposing a method to measure the effects of gravitomagnetism using the data from the laser ranged satellites LAGEOS and LAGEOS-2. He was featured on the cover of the 6 September 2007, issue of Nature, dedicated to his review paper on Dragging of Inertial Frames and General Relativity. He is the Principal Investigator for the Italian Space Agency (ASI) on the Laser Relativity Satellite (LARES) mission, a space mission aimed to improve the accuracy of the measurement of frame-dragging.

In 2010, he won the Giuseppe Occhialini Medal and Prize, jointly awarded by the Italian Physical Society and the Institute of Physics.

In 2014, Ciufolini was accused of publishing papers on the scientific pre-print archive arXiv under pseudonyms, such as G. Felici and G. Forst, which is a violation of the arXiv terms. For this and other reasons, Ciufolini twice sued physicist Lorenzo Iorio for defamation, but he was acquitted in both cases. Not satisfied, Ciufolini sued Iorio for damages in civil court, winning the case this time.
