= Binary Black Hole Grand Challenge Alliance =

International physics organization

- Formation: 1993
- Members: University of Texas at Austin; University of Illinois; University of North Carolina, Chapel Hill; Cornell University; Syracuse University; University of Pittsburgh; Northwestern University; Penn State University
- Lead PI: Richard Matzner
- Co-Is: J. Browne, M. Choptuik, E. Seidel, L. Smarr, P. Saylor, F. Saied, J. York, C. Evans, S. Shapiro, S. Teukolsky, G. Fox, J. Winicour, S. Finn, P. Laguna

The Binary Black Hole Grand Challenge Alliance (BBH Challenge Alliance) was a scientific collaboration of international physics institutes and research groups dedicated to simulating the sources and predicting the waveforms for gravitational waves, in anticipation of gravitational radiation experiments such as LIGO.

== History ==
The BBH Challenge Alliance was established in 1993. This was an alliance of numerical relativity groups engaged in a friendly competition to tackle the grand challenge of simulating binary black hole collisions for the purpose of understanding gravitational wave signatures that would be detected by experiments such as LIGO.
