= Bosscha Observatory =

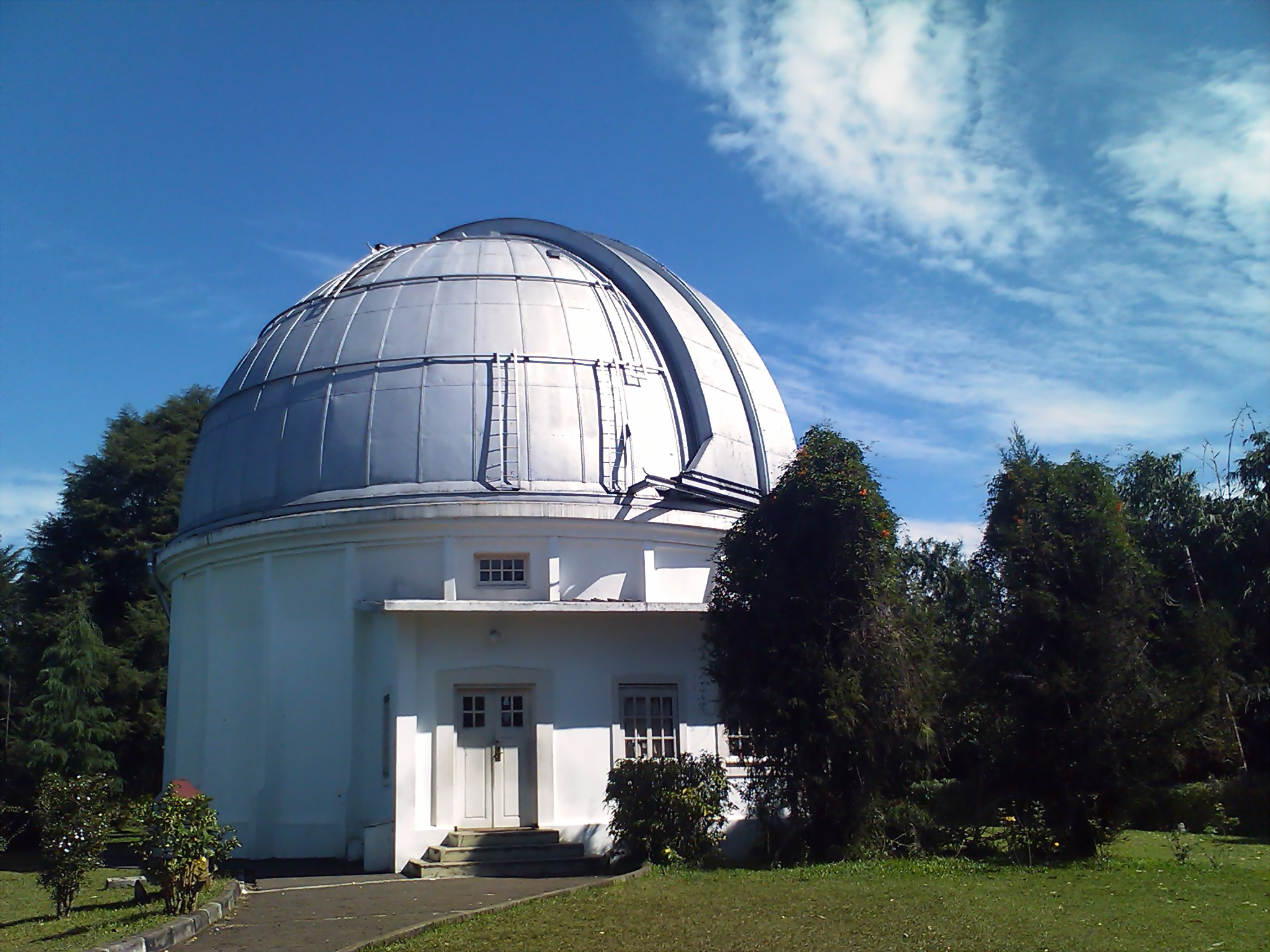
- Alternative names: 299 BOS
- Organization: Institut Teknologi Bandung
- Observatory code: 299
- Location: Lembang, West Java, Indonesia
- Coordinates: 6°49′28″S 107°36′56″E
- Altitude: 1,310 m (4,300 ft)
- Established: 1923
- Website: bosscha.itb.ac.id

Telescopes
- Zeiss Telescope: 60 cm Double Refractor
- Schmidt "Bima Sakti" Telescope: 71.12cm Schmidt Reflector
- The Bamberg Refractor: 37 cm Refractor
- The Cassegrain GOTO: Cassegrain
- The Unitron Refractor: Refractor
- Related media on Commons

Bosscha Observatory is the oldest modern observatory in Indonesia, and one of the oldest in Asia. The observatory is located in Lembang, West Bandung Regency, West Java, approximately 15 kilometers (9.3 mi) north of Bandung. It is situated on a hilly six hectares of land and is 1,310 m (4,300 ft) above mean sea level plateau. The IAU observatory code for Bosscha is 299.

== History ==
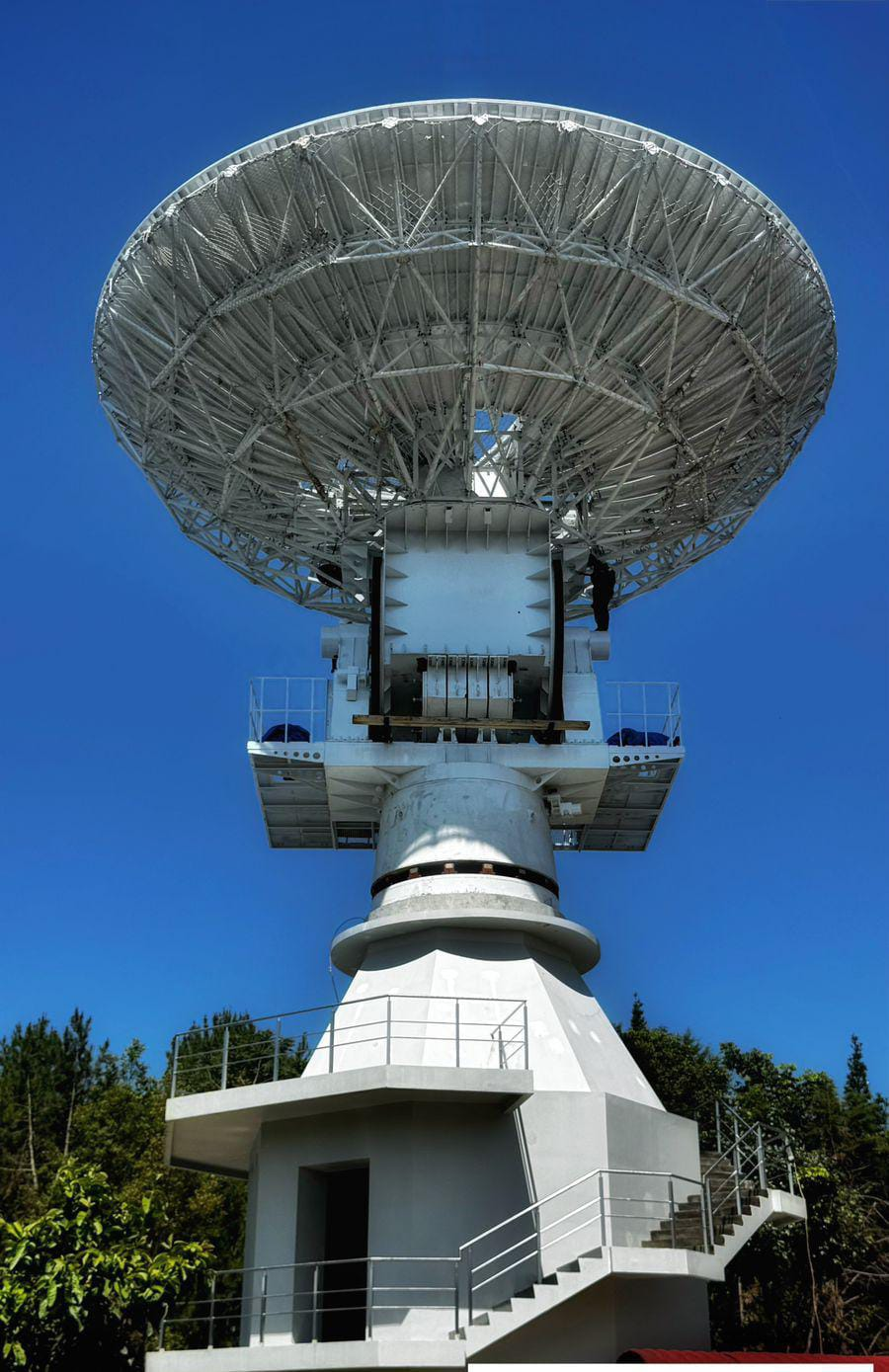
Institut Teknologi Bandung (ITB) and Bosscha Observatory Very Long Baseline Interferometry (VLBI) Global Observing System (VGOS) radio telescope research facility at Lembang.

During the first meeting of the Nederlandsch-Indische Sterrekundige Vereeniging (Dutch-Indies Astronomical Society) in the 1920s, it was agreed that an observatory was needed to study astronomy in the Dutch East Indies. Of all locations in the Indonesia archipelago, a tea plantation in Malabar, a few kilometers north of Bandung in West Java was selected. It is on the hilly north side of the city with a non-obstructed view of the sky and with close access to the city that was planned to become the new capital of the Dutch colony, replacing Batavia (present-day Jakarta). The observatory is named after the tea plantation owner Karel Albert Rudolf Bosscha, son of the physicist Johannes Bosscha and a major force in the development of science and technology in the Dutch East Indies, who granted six hectares of his property for the new observatory.

Construction of the observatory began in 1923 and was completed in 1928. Since then a continuous observation of the sky was made. The first international publication from Bosscha was published in 1922. Observations from Bosscha were halted during World War II and after the war a major reconstruction was necessary. On 17 October 1951, the Dutch-Indies Astronomical Society handed over operation of the observatory to the government of Indonesia. In 1959 the observatory's operation was given to the Institut Teknologi Bandung and has been an integral part of the research and formal education of astronomy in Indonesia.

== Facilities ==
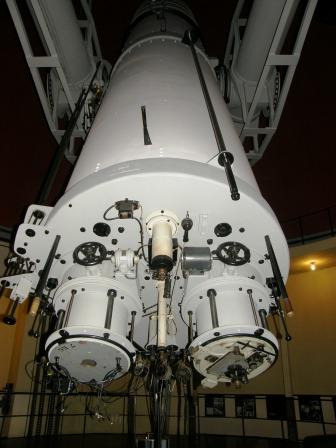
The Zeiss double refractor

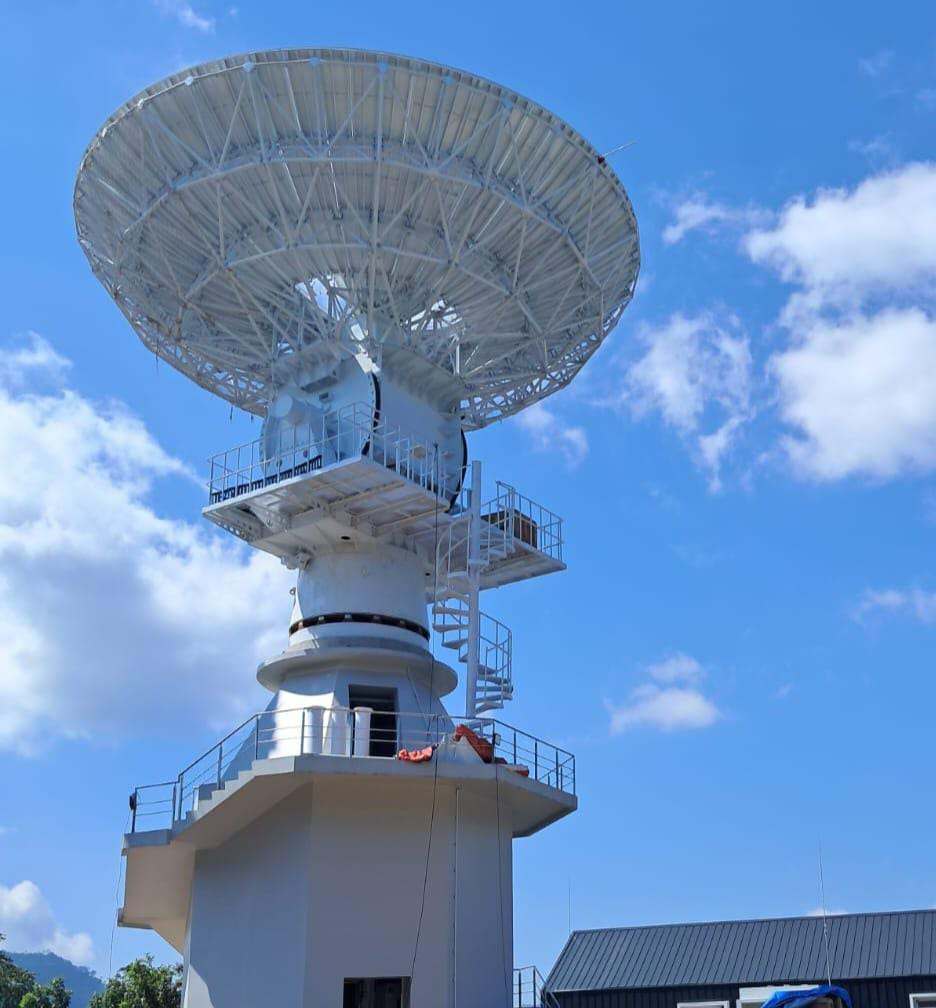
Institut Teknologi Bandung (ITB) and Bosscha Observatory (VLBI) (VGOS) radio telescope research facility

Five large telescopes were installed in Bosscha:

1. The Zeiss double refractor
  This telescope is mainly used to observe visual binary stars, conduct photometric studies on eclipsing binaries, image lunar craters, observe planets (Mars, Saturn and Jupiter) and to observe comet details and other heavy bodies. The telescope has two objective lenses with a diameter of 60 cm (24 in) each and a focal length of 10.7 m (35 ft).
2. The Schmidt telescope (nicknamed the Bima Sakti, or "Milky Way" telescope)
  This telescope is used to study galactic structure, stellar spectra, asteroid studies, supernovae, and to photograph heavy bodies. The main lens diameter is 71.12 cm (28.00 in), the correcting bi-concave and convex lens is 50 cm (20 in) with a focal length of 2.5 m (8.2 ft). It is also equipped with a spectral prism with a prime angle of 6.10 degrees for stellar spectra, a wedge sensitometer and a film recorder.
3. The Bamberg refractor (not to be mixed-up with the Bamberg-Refraktor in Berlin)
  This telescope is used to determine stellar magnitude, stellar distance, and photometric studies of eclipsing stars, solar imaging, and others. It is equipped with a photoelectric photometer, has a 37 cm (15 in) lens diameter with 7 m (23 ft) meter of focal length.
4. The Cassegrain GOTO
  This was a gift from the Japanese government. This computer controlled telescope can automatically view objects from a database and this was the first digital telescope at Bosscha. The telescope is also equipped with a photometer and spectrometer-spectrograph.
5. The Unitron refractor
  This telescope is used for observing hilal, lunar eclipse, solar eclipse and sunspot photography, and also other objects. Lens diameter is 10.2 cm (4.0 in) and a focal length of 150 cm (59 in).

== See also ==
- List of astronomical observatories
- Timau National Observatory
