= Carl Bamberg =

German engineer and entrepreneur

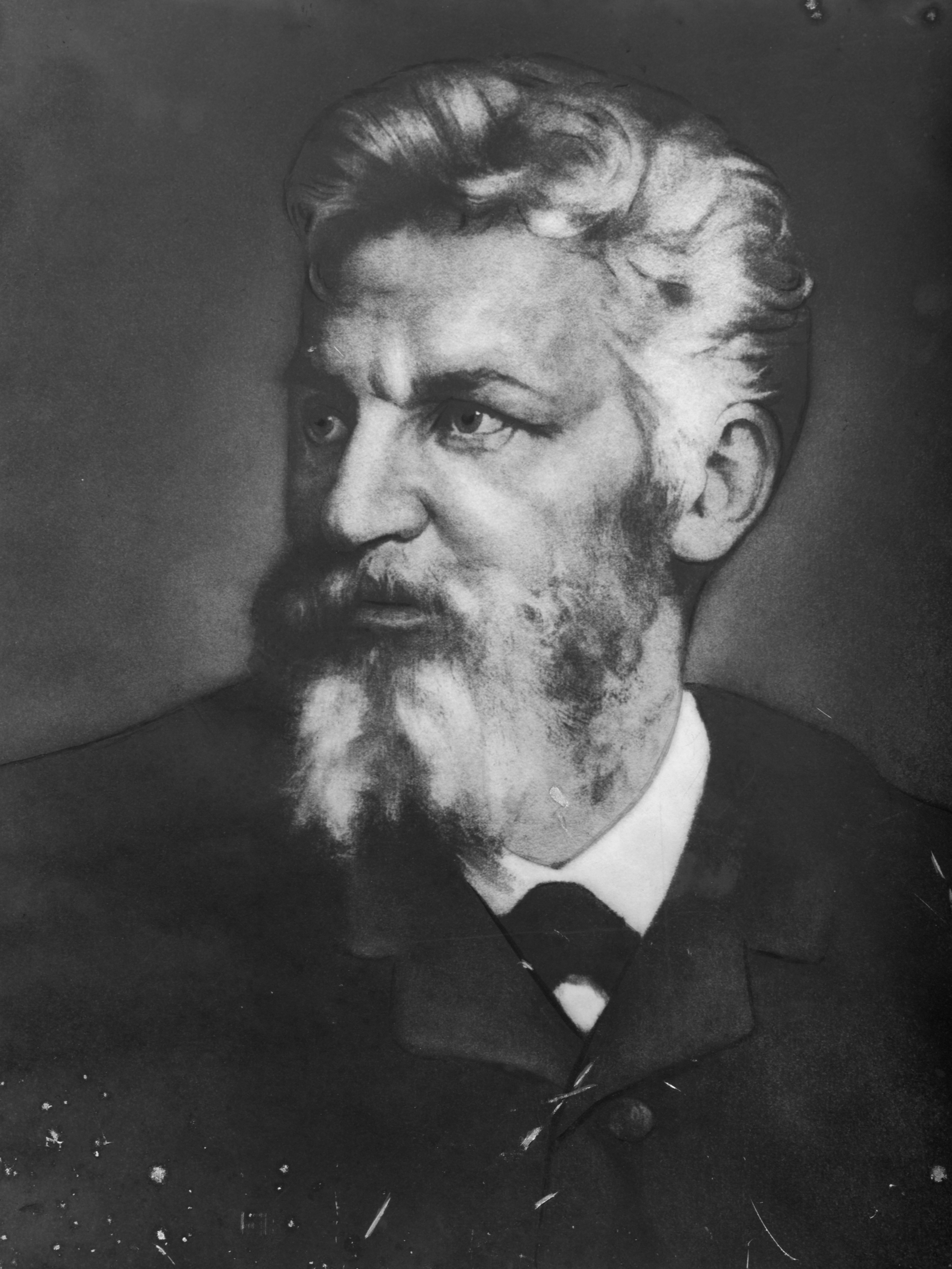

Johann Carl Wilhelm Anton Bamberg (born 12 July 1847 in Kranichfeld, died 4 June 1892 in Friedenau) was a German engineer and entrepreneur.

He began his career as an apprentice at Carl Zeiss. In 1871 he founded his own company, manufacturing cathetometers and planimeters.

He manufactured equatorial telescopes for the Düsseldorf Observatory, the Jena Observatory and the Urania Berlin Observatory. He is best known for the Bamberg-Refraktor, a large telescope in Berlin.

In 1878 he set up a time ball station at Wilhelmshaven.

After his death, his company became Askania-Werke AG, which continues to this day.

== Family ==
His parents were Johann Christian Heinrich Bamberg from Kranichfeld and Johanna Dorothe Karoline, née Heintz, from Berka.

He married Emma Caroline Roux (1847–1908), daughter of University of Jena fencing master Friedrich Wilhelm Roux, on 26 April 1874. They had two sons, Ernst Wilhelm Julius Bamberg (1875–1882) and Paul Adolf Bamberg (1876–1946).
