= Timau National Observatory =

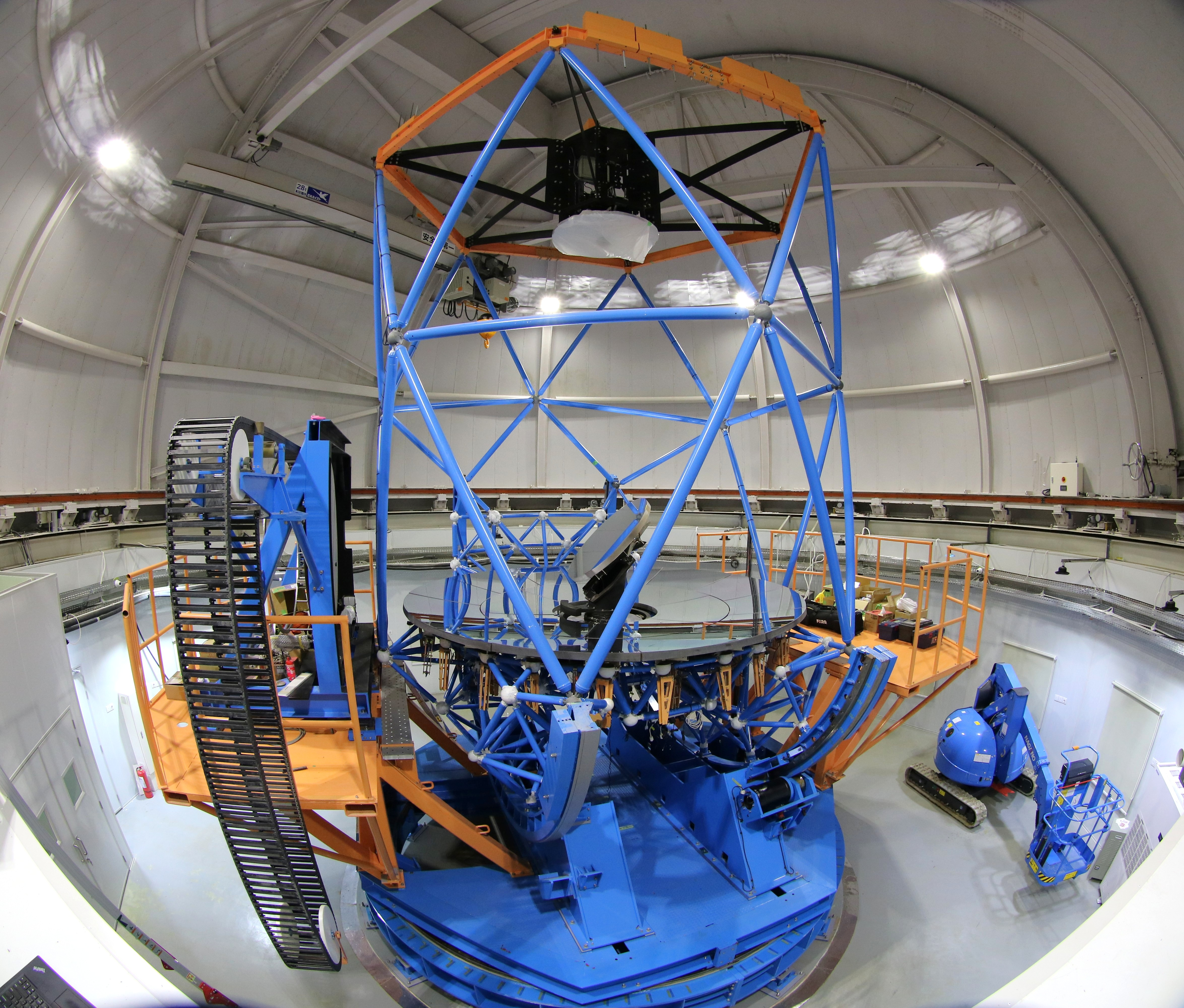
- Organization: National Research and Innovation Agency
- Location: Kupang Regency, East Nusa Tenggara, Indonesia
- Coordinates: 9°35′50″S 123°56′50″E
- Altitude: 1,347 m (4,419 ft)
- Website: www.brin.go.id
- Telescopes: OBNAS
- Location of Timau National Observatory
- Related media on Commons

Timau National Observatory is the newest observatory in Indonesia. The observatory is located in Kupang Regency, East Nusa Tenggara, approximately 130 kilometers (81 mi) north east of Kupang city. It is situated on a hilly thirty five hectares of land and is 1,347 m (4,419 ft) above mean sea level plateau.

== History ==
The Timau National Observatory (Indonesian: Observatorium Nasional Timau) is the second astronomical observatory in Indonesia, located on Mount Timau, East Nusa Tenggara. This observatory was established as an effort to address the limitations of the Bosscha Observatory in Lembang, Bandung, due to increasing light pollution and overcast weather. Timau Observatory is expected to become a more productive center for astronomical research due to its strategic location near the equator and its darker skies with less light pollution.

The ratification of the Republic of Indonesia Law No. 21 of 2013 on Space Activities opens up opportunities for the development of astronomy in Indonesia. Law No. 21/2013 mandates the Indonesian nation in space science and technology, including astronomy and astrophysics.

The establishment of the location of an observatory is not an easy matter. There are many aspects to consider, including the number of clear nights per year, sky brightness, visibility, accessibility, and of course, economic considerations. Photometric nights represent the stability of sky transparency, while visibility is an indication of turbulence in the Earth's atmosphere that affects the quality of observations. To designate Mount Timau as the location for the National Observatory, a study of sky quality for observations has been conducted for over 7 years by astronomers from Institut Teknologi Bandung.

The National Timau Observatory in Kupang Regency, East Nusa Tenggara (NTT) is 99 percent ready. This observatory, which has been under construction since 2021, will become the largest observatory in Southeast Asia by 2025.

== Type of observation ==
The Timau OBNAS will provide ephemeris services related to the positions of celestial bodies as a function of time, in the form of a national astronomical almanac published periodically. Currently, the ephemeris services in the form of an astronomical almanac. This activity can later be expanded with the development of crescent moon sighting techniques and coordination of national observation networks. One of the expansions involves joint observations with BMKG regarding weather, climate, and seismic research. One proposal related to the use of OBNAS from UNDANA (Nusa Cendana University) in Kupang is exoplanet observation, implementation of image physics on telescopes, remote controlling and automation, Shack-Hartmann wavefront sensor research, electromagnetic mirror correction techniques for telescopes, and solar activity.

With the existing capacity of telescopes, including small telescope, the potential for observing transient objects is also quite high. As of early 2016, there have been 12,000 transient objects detected with dozens of transients observed every night. Of the data available, only 10% has been studied through spectroscopy. Therefore, OBNAS Timau can also contribute to the discovery of supernovae.

== Facilities ==
Currently large telescopes were installed in Timau:

1. 3.8 meters Reflector Telescope
  The OBNAS telescope is suitable for advanced observations from the large telescopes to come, such as LSST (The Large Synoptic Survey Telescope), GMT (Giant Magellan Telescope), TMT (Thirty Meter Telescope), etc.

== See also ==
- List of astronomical observatories
- Bosscha Observatory
