= Urania (Berlin) =

German science center

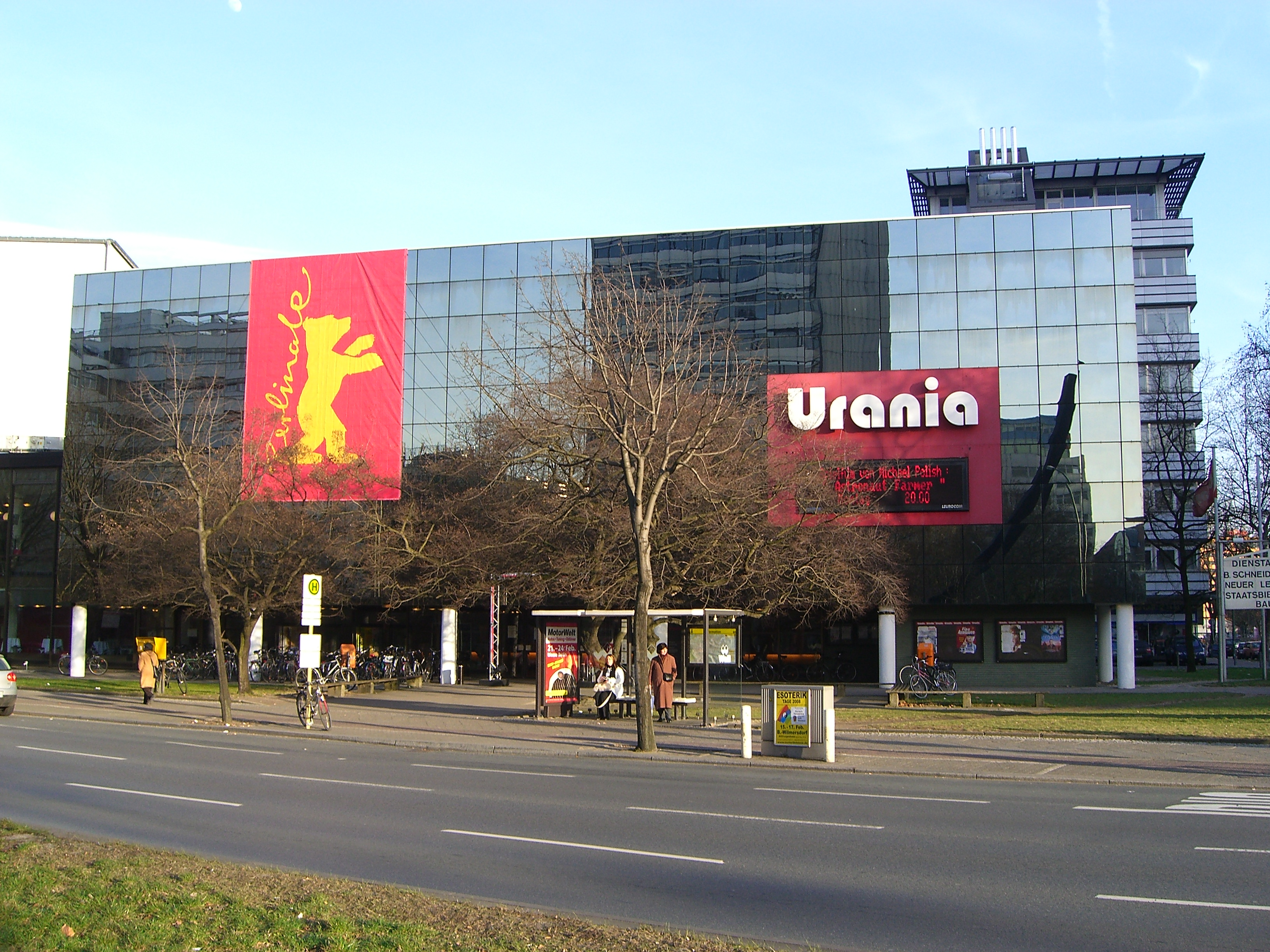
Die Urania Berlin

Urania is a science centre and scientific society in Berlin, Germany.

Urania was founded in Berlin in 1888, following an idea of Alexander von Humboldt, by Max Wilhelm Meyer and Wilhelm Foerster. Its aim is to communicate the most recent scientific findings to the broad public. With its 2000 members, Urania organises more than 1000 events per year, attracting about 130,000 visitors.

Since its centenary in 1988, the society has awarded the Urania Medaille annually to individuals who have supported significantly the implementation of its aims. Recipients are Nobel laureates in natural science as well as social scientists, artists, and politicians.

The Berlin International Film Festival uses the centre's 866-seat theatre to host film premieres in the Generation section.

== See also ==
- List of science centers
