= Jürgen Hamel =

German astronomy historian

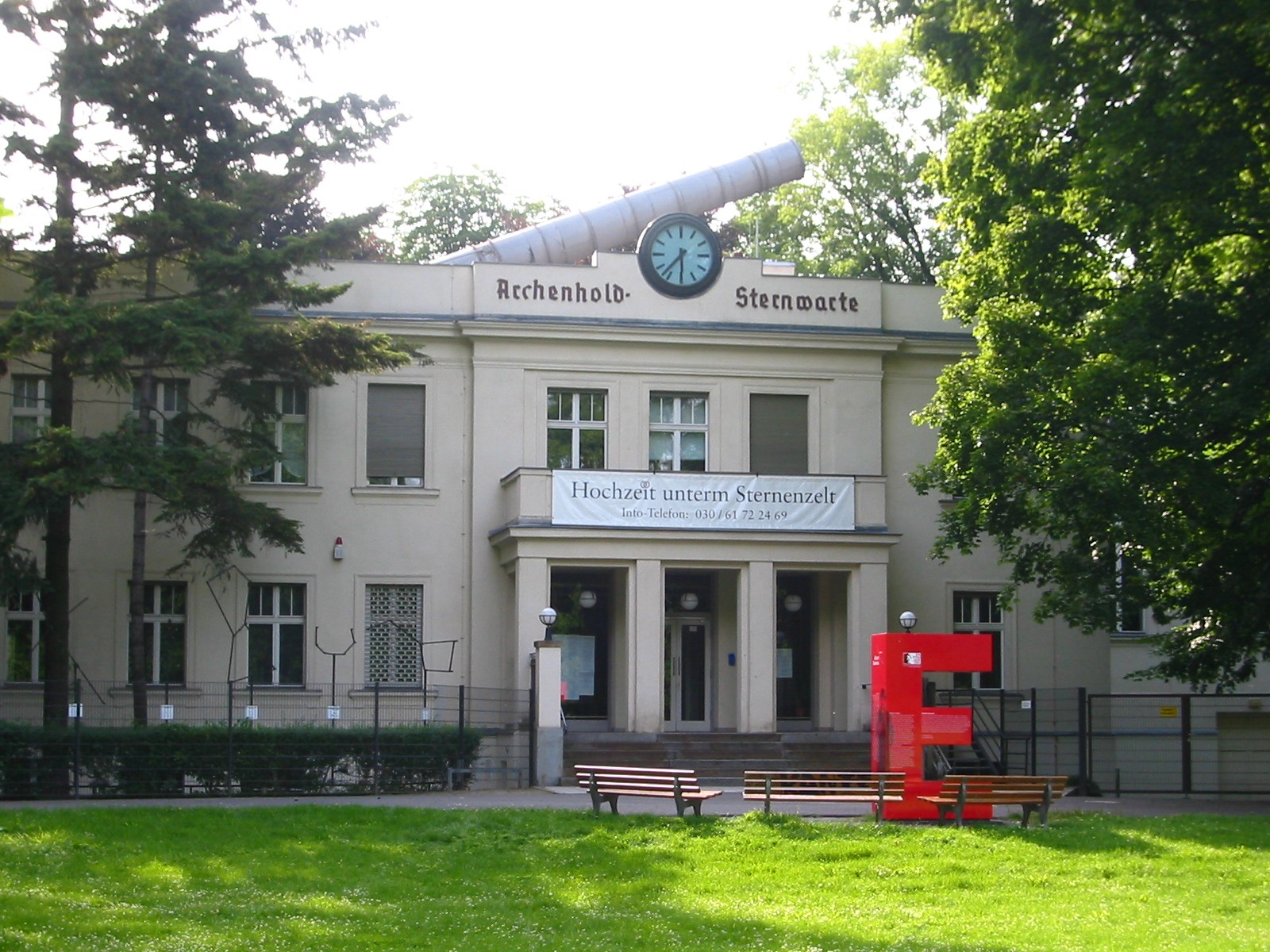
Archenhold ObservatoryMain place of work for Jürgen Hamel

Jürgen Hamel (born 6 June 1951) is a German astronomy historian. His research areas are the history of astronomy in the Middle Ages and the early modern period, the period around 1800, the history of astrophysics, astronomy and cultural history, and the history of astronomical instruments.

== Life and career ==
Hamel was born in Stralsund. After an apprenticeship as a vocational trainee with Abitur, he studied philosophy, history and education at the University of Leipzig and then worked as a university lecturer at the University of Rostock, where he obtained his doctorate in 1982 with a thesis on the early history of astrophysics.

From 1978 to 1991, Hamel worked at the Archenhold Observatory as a student of Dieter B. Herrmann. In addition to his scientific work, he was involved in popularising astronomy, gave numerous lectures within the framework of the Gesellschaft zur Verbreitung wissenschaftlicher Kenntnisse and was active on the editorial board of the journal Astronomy and Astronautics published by the Cultural Association of the GDR. From 1990 onwards, Hamel was a contributor to the publication of the Collected Works of Nicolaus Copernicus and Johannes Kepler. In 1996, as part of a scholarship from the Gerda Henkel Foundation, he worked on The First German Translation of the Major Astronomical Work of Nicolaus Copernicus 1586. From 1998 to 2000, he worked at the Museum für Astronomie und Technikgeschichte in Kassel. For many years he lectured on the "History of Astronomy" and the "Introduction to Astronomy" at the University of Koblenz and Landau.

On 17 May 2001, Hamel was elected member of the Leibniz-Sozietät der Wissenschaften zu Berlin. He is co-founder and co-editor of the publication series Acta Historica Astronomiae, editor-in-chief of the journal Astronomie + Raumfahrt im Unterricht as well as, since 2019, of the scientific yearbook for the history of Pomerania Baltic Studies.

== Publications (selection) ==
Introductions to the history of astronomy

- Astronomie in alter Zeit. (Archenhold-Sternwarte Berlin-Treptow. Vorträge und Schriften. 60). 2nd ed. edition. Berlin-Treptow 1981.
- Bearbeitung der deutschsprachigen Ausgabe von Angel Bonov: Sternbilder, Sternsagen: Mythen und Legenden um Sternbilder. Übers. aus dem Bulgarischen von Leo Korniljew. 2nd edition. Leipzig/ Jena/ Berlin 1986, ISBN 3-332-00031-4.
- Astronomiegeschichte in Quellentexten. Von Hesiod bis Hubble. Springer Spektrum, 1996, ISBN 3-8274-0072-4.
- Geschichte der Astronomie. Von den Anfängen bis zur Gegenwart. Birkhäuser Verlag, Basel/ Boston/ Berlin 1998, ISBN 3-7643-5787-8. 2nd edition. Kosmos-Franckh, Stuttgart 2002, ISBN 3-440-09168-6.
- History of astronomy. In Texten von Hesiod bis Hubble. 2. erw. Auflage. Magnus Verlag, Essen 2004, ISBN 3-88400-421-2.
- Meilensteine der Astronomie. Von Aristoteles bis Hawking. Kosmos, 2006, ISBN 3-440-10179-7.

Biographies and special topics

- Zur Entstehungs- und Wirkungsgeschichte der Kantschen Kosmogonie. (Communications of the Archenhold-Sternwarte. 130). Berlin-Treptow 1979.
- Johann Karl Friedrich Zöllner. Versuch einer Analyse seiner philosophischen Position (Communications of the Archenhold-Sternwarte. 129). Berlin-Treptow 1977.
- Friedrich Wilhelm Bessel (Biographien hervorragender Naturwissenschaftler, Techniker und Mediziner. 67). BSB Teubner Verlagsgesellschaft, Leipzig, 1984 ISSN 0232-3516
- Friedrich Wilhelm Herschel (Biographien hervorragender Naturwissenschaftler, Techniker und Mediziner. 89). BSB Teubner Verlagsgesellschaft, Leipzig, 1988, ISBN 3-322-00482-1.
- Nicolaus Copernicus. Leben, Werk und Wirkung. Spektrum Akademischer Verlag, Heidelberg/ Berlin/ Oxford 1994, ISBN 3-86025-307-7.
- Die astronomischen Forschungen in Kassel unter William IV. Mit einer wissenschaftlichen Teiledition der Übersetzung des Hauptwerkes von Copernicus 1586. (Acta Historica Astronomiae. 2). 2nd corrected edition. Verlag Harri Deutsch, Thun/ Frankfurt, 1998, ISBN 3-8171-1690-X.
- Jürgen Hamel, Eberhard Knobloch, Herbert Pieper (ed.): Alexander von Humboldt in Berlin. Sein Einfluß auf die Entwicklung der Wissenschaften. (Algorismus. Studien zur Geschichte der Mathematik und der Naturwissenschaften. 41). Augsburg 2003.
- Jürgen Hamel (ed.): Wissenschaftliches Kolloquium zum 75. Geburtstag von Hans-Jürgen Treder. (Sitzungsberichte der Leibniz-Sozietät), trafo, Berlin 2003
- Herrmann, Dieter B. In Wer war wer in der DDR? 5th edition. Vol. 1. Ch. Links, Berlin 2010, ISBN 978-3-86153-561-4.
- Wattenberg, Diedrich. In Wer war wer in der DDR? 5th edition. Vol. 2. Ch. Links, Berlin 2010, ISBN 978-3-86153-561-4.
- Ein Beitrag zur Familiengeschichte von Friedrich Wilhelm Herschel. Nach den Quellen bearbeitete Stammreihe des Astronomen. In Mitteilungen der Gauss Gesellschaft 26 (1989), pp. 99–103 (Mitteilungen der Archenhold-Sternwarte; 164).
- Meisterwerk der Kartografie. Die Lubinsche Pommernkarte von 1618. (Schriften des STRALSUND MUSEUM, Bd. 3), Stralsund 2018, ISSN 2568-6526.

Classics Studies

- as collaborator: Bibliographia Kepleriana. Verzeichnis der gedruckten Schriften von und über Johannes Kepler. Ergänzungsband zur zweiten Auflage. Munich 1998, ISBN 3-406-01687-1.
- with Klaus Harro Tiemann und Martin Pape (ed.): Die Kosmosvorträge 1827/28 in der Berliner Singakademie. Insel Verlag, Frankfurt/ Leipzig 2004
- with Miguel A. Granada and Ludolf von Mackensen: Christoph Rothmann's Handbuch der Astronomie von 1589. Verlag Harri Deutsch, 2003, ISBN 3-8171-1718-3.
- with Thomas Posch (ed.): De revolutionibus orbium coelestium. (Ostwalds Klassiker der exakten Wissenschaften. 300). Harri Deutsch Verlag, Frankfurt, 2008, ISBN 978-3-8171-3300-0.
- as editor: Über den Bau des Himmels. Abhandlungen über die Struktur des Universums und die Entwicklung der Himmelskörper 1784–1814 von Wilhelm Herschel. (Ostwalds Klassiker der exakten Wissenschaften. 288). Harri Deutsch Verlag, Frankfurt, 2001, ISBN 3-8171-3288-3.
- Nachwort. Immanuel Kant: Allgemeine Naturgeschichte und Theorie des Himmels. (Ostwalds Klassiker der exakten Wissenschaften. 12). Frankfurt, 2005, pp. 147–212.
- Menso Folkerts (ed.): Nicolaus Copernicus Gesamtausgabe. Vol. III/3: De Revolutionibus. Die erste deutsche Übersetzung in der Grazer Handschrift. Kritische Edition. bearb. von Andreas Kühne, Jürgen Hamel. De Gruyter, Berlin 2007, ISBN 978-3-05-004355-5.
- Die Himmelsvermessung des Johann Bayer. (Begleitbuch zur Uranometria). Gerchsheim 2010, ISBN 978-3-934223-36-3.
- Studien zur "Sphaera" des Johannes de Sacrobosco. (Acta Historica Astronomiae. 51). Leipzig 2014
- Peter Apian: Instrument Buch. Reprint der Originalausgabe Ingolstadt 1533. Edited with a foreword by Jürgen Hamel. Reprintverlag, Leipzig 1990.

Criticisms of astrology

- Astrology – Tochter der Astronomie? (akzent-Reihe. 85). 2nd edition. Urania Verlag, Leipzig/ Jena/ Berlin 1987, ISBN 3-332-00128-0.
- Astrologie – Tochter der Astronomie? (Spektrum des Wissens. 3426). Moewig, Rastatt 1989, ISBN 3-8118-3426-6.
- Begriffe der Astrologie. Von Abendstern bis Zwillingsproblem. Harri Deutsch Verlag, Frankfurt, 2010, ISBN 978-3-8171-1785-7.
