= Gesamtausgabe =

Gesamtausgabe (German for collected works) may refer to:

- Beethoven Gesamtausgabe, the first collected edition (1862-1888) of the works of Ludwig van Beethoven
- Bruckner Gesamtausgabe, the critical edition of the works of Anton Bruckner
- Nicolaus Copernicus Gesamtausgabe, the comprehensive, commented collection of works by, about, and related to Nicolaus Copernicus
- Heidegger Gesamtausgabe, the collected works of Martin Heidegger
- Weimar edition of Martin Luther's works, the critical complete edition of all writings of Martin Luther and his verbal statements, in Latin and German
- Marx-Engels-Gesamtausgabe, the largest collection of the writing of Karl Marx and Friedrich Engels in any language
- Alte Mozart-Ausgabe, the first complete edition of the music of Wolfgang Amadeus Mozart
- Neue Mozart-Ausgabe, the second complete works edition of the music of Wolfgang Amadeus Mozart
- Franz Schubert's Works, a late 19th-century publication of Franz Schubert's compositions.
- Weber Gesamtausgabe, the collected works of Max Weber
- Carl-Maria-von-Weber-Gesamtausgabe, the scientific-critical edition of all works of the composer Carl Maria von Weber
