= Archenhold Observatory =

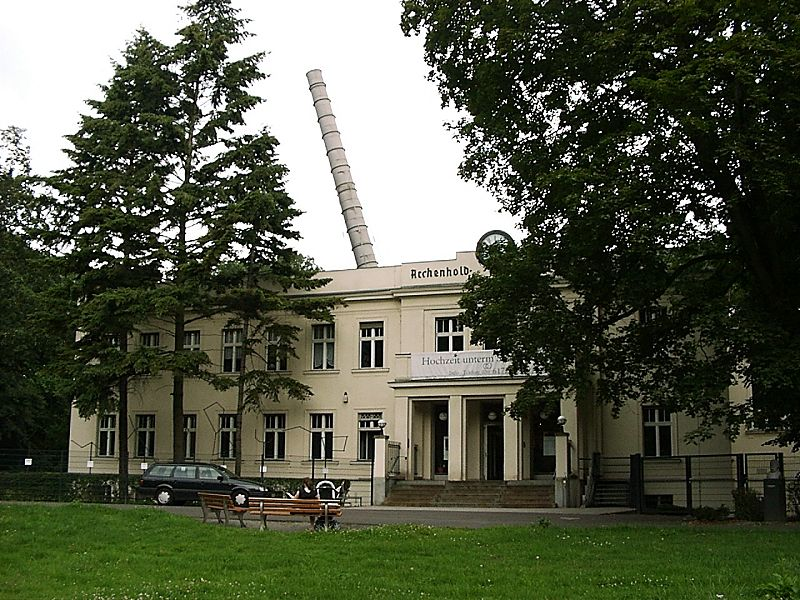
- Observatory code: 604
- Location: Berlin, Germany
- Coordinates: 52°29′09″N 13°28′34″E
- Altitude: 41 m (135 ft)
- Established: September 1896
- Website: www.astw.de

Telescopes
- Great Refractor: 68 cm
- Cassegrain: 500 mm
- Coudé refractor: 150 mm
- Astrograph: 120 mm
- Urania Refractor: 12 in
- Comet seeker: 250 mm
- Newtonian: 250 mm
- Related media on Commons

The Archenhold Observatory (German: Archenhold-Sternwarte) was named in honour of Friedrich Simon Archenhold, is an observatory in Berlin-Treptow. It houses the Großer Refraktor (Great Refractor), which is the longest pointable telescope in the world. It is also called Die Himmelskanone (Celestial Cannon).

== History ==
=== Industrial Exposition ===
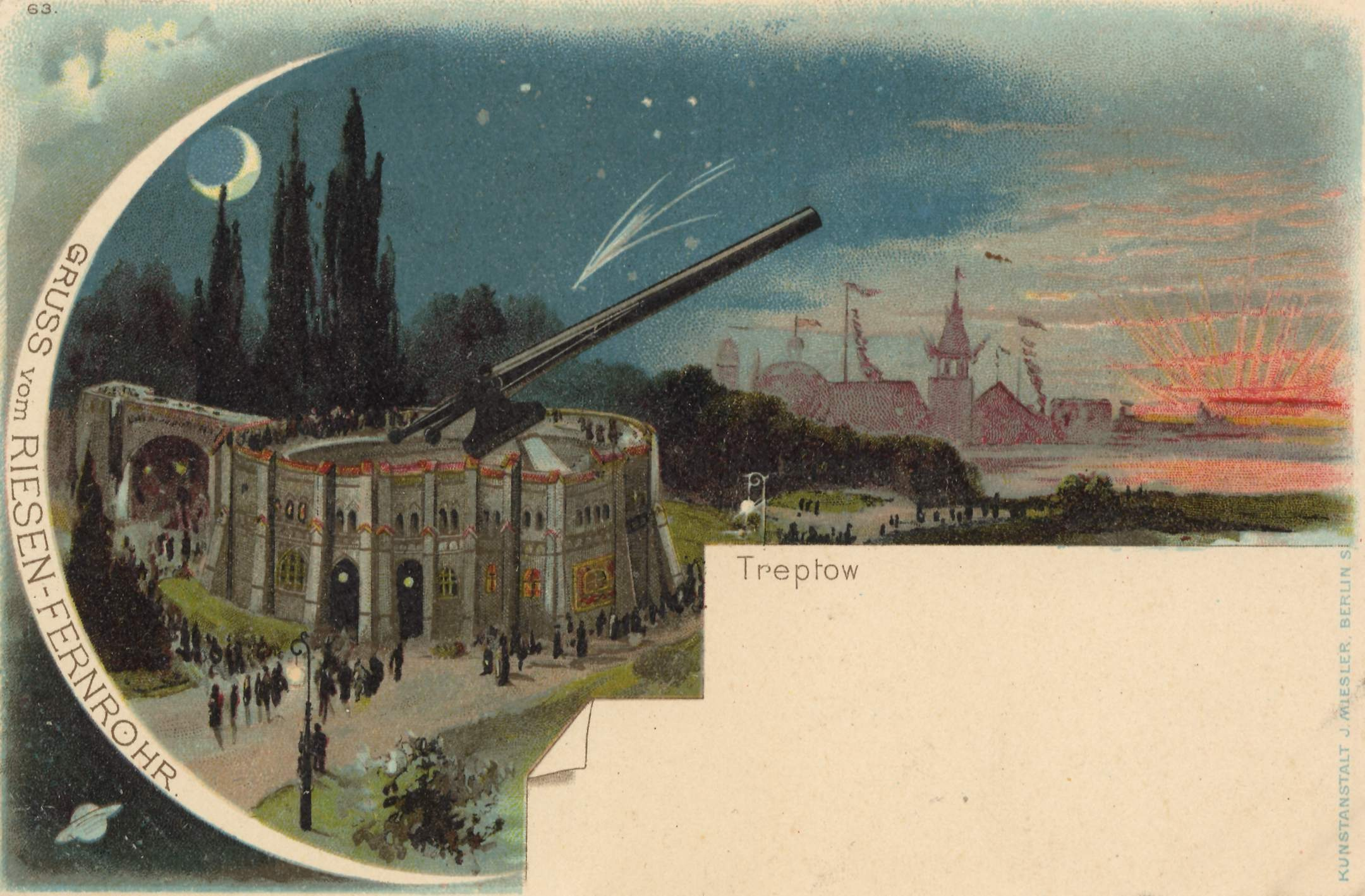
The Great Refractor at the Great Industrial Exposition of Berlin 1896

The Archenhold Observatory began as a temporary installation at the 1896 Great Industrial Exposition of Berlin. At the initiative of Wilhelm Foerster and Max Wilhelm Meyer, it was intended to present scientific and astronomical knowledge to the general public. Plans for a large telescope that Friedrich Simon Archenhold had been working on were invoked for this purpose. Although his plans were for a research instrument, its design was already being criticised at the time. Admittance charges at the exposition were intended to finance the construction and later relocation of the instrument. The telescope was erected in the Treptower Park and sheltered in a wooden building that also provided exhibition space and a lecture theatre. When the industrial exposition opened on 1 May 1896, the Great Refractor was still unfinished; it began operation in September 1896. The telescope has an aperture of 68 cm (27 in) and a focal length of 21 m (69 ft); the movable mass is 130 metric tons.

Due to the late completion there was no finance to move the telescope after the exposition. At the end of 1896 the city of Berlin gave permission for the observatory to remain in Treptower Park. Archenhold, without an astronomer's salary, decided to turn the installation into a public observatory. It was operated by a society, the Verein Treptow-Sternwarte e. V. with Archenhold as president. This is now considered the oldest and largest public observatory in Germany.

The exhibition covered themes like history of astronomy, Earth and Moon, Sun and planets, comets and meteors, stars and star clusters, instruments and optics. Observations included standard objects, lunar eclipses, comets and the Nova Cygni 1903. 23,000 visitors attended in 1897, the number rising to 60,000 by 1899 and remaining about constant until the 1930s.

=== New building ===
In 1908, the original wooden building was demolished and on 4 April 1909 a new building was inaugurated.

On 2 June 1915, Albert Einstein gave his first public talk about General Relativity at the observatory. In 1931, Friedrich Simon Archenhold was succeeded as director by his son Günter Archenhold. Due to his Jewish ancestry, he was forced to resign in 1936. The family was expelled from the observatory; some emigrated, others ended up in Nazi concentration camps. The observatory was integrated into the city's school system. During World War II a bomb hit the southwest wing, but the Great Refractor was not severely damaged.

Observations resumed as soon as July 1945 for the solar eclipse. Edgar Mädlow was interim director, assisted by Herbert Pfaffe.

=== Research of Friedrich and Günter Archenhold ===
Friedrich Archenhold's first research, for which he was commissioned by Wilhelm Foerster, was aimed at developing the photographic method. Foerster himself was not an observer, but a clever scientific politician: he commissioned his assistants to test new techniques. Archenhold tested a new, short focal length astro-camera, first at the Baltic Sea, then at a station set up especially for the test in Berlin-Halensee. He succeeded in obtaining further photographic evidence of the nebula at ξ Persei (now called the "California Nebula"). After building the giant telescope, he continued his technical tests (with photographs and moving images) and astronomical observations in his new "Treptow-Observatory".

Research reports and technical articles were published on the comets Perrine in 1897 and Halley in 1910, a fireball and noctilucent clouds. The participation in the observation campaign of Nova Persei in 1901 is documented, which followed earlier similar observations. The cause of novae (surface eruptions on white dwarfs in cataclysmic variable stars) was still not understood at the time. Novae (unpredictably erupting stars) and variable stars and the study of their periods were one of the most important and topical areas of research at the time.

One publication was written in 1912 after observations of the Great Red Spot on Jupiter through the giant telescope. The son of the observatory's founder, Günter Archenhold, published mainly on solar research and the halo phenomenon. He only signed his first specialist publication in 1930 (and previously with his father) with the affiliation "Treptow-Sternwarte" (Treptow Observatory).

=== Naming after Archenhold ===
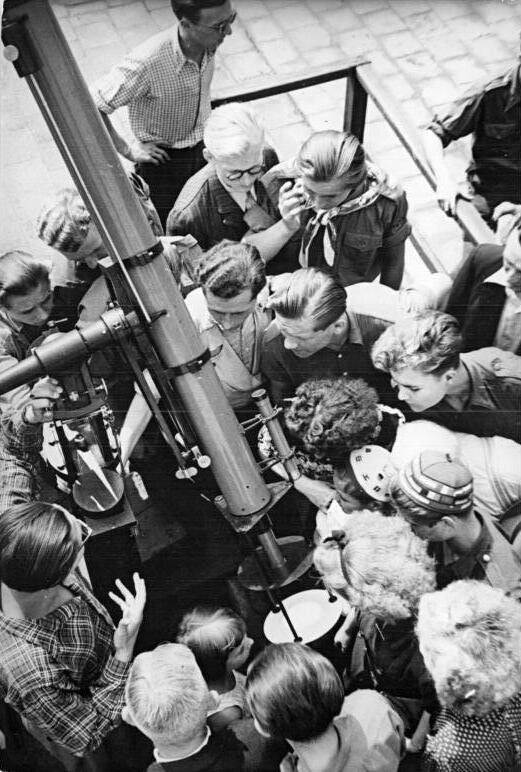
Participants of the IIIrd World Festival of Youth and Students visit the Archenhold Observatory in August 1951

In 1946 the city of Berlin renamed the observatory Archenhold-Sternwarte. On 1 June 1948 Diedrich Wattenberg, who had been working with Archenhold, was made director. Annual visitor numbers rose from 8,000 in 1946 to 25,000 in 1949. In 1958, the Great Refractor was decommissioned, but retained as a monument of technology.

=== Modern equipment and extension(s) in GDR-time ===
From 1959 onwards, the observatory was increasingly used for school education in physics and astronomy. To support this, in the 1960s, two further domes were erected in the grounds. A lecture theatre was also added, and in 1966 the "solar physics cabinet" (a special invention for showing the sun and its spectrum in a lecture hall) was created, which could project the Sun at 80 cm (31 in) diameter or a solar spectrum at 1.5 m length. It was an invention by the brilliant optical engineer Edwin Rolf (Rathenow near Berlin), a further development of the Jensch coelostat for didactic (display) purposes.

In November 1976, Wattenberg retired and Dieter B. Herrmann was made director of the observatory. The technical director, Eckehard Rothenberg was in charge for all further modernisations, the construction of two planetariums and the restoration of the Great Refractor. In March 1982, the small planetarium in Treptow was replaced with a modern ZKP II model of the Zeiss company. 1983 saw the completion of the reconstruction of the Great Refractor, which had started in 1977. The historical instrument was then again movable and fully functional. Annual visitor numbers during the 1980s were around the 70,000. Archenhold had already suggested a large planetarium. This became reality in 1987 when the Zeiss Major Planetarium was built in the Ernst-Thälmann-Park. From the beginning on, this was led by the directors of the Archenhold Observatory; Rothenberg was the leading astronomer-engineer of its construction and later, more media technicians were employed specifically for its maintenance and subordinated to the Treptow directors. In 2007, the two houses became separate departments within the German Museum of Technology but were reunified in 2013, and form a single entity with the major planetarium and observatory in former West-Berlin since 2016.

=== Research 1972-1992 ===
In 1972, a research department for the history of astronomy was set up at the observatory, which was enriched by members of its own working group of hobby astronomers. The head of department was Dr. Dieter B. Herrmann until 1976. After his habilitation in 1986, he also taught at Berlin's university and occasionally supervised doctoral theses.

On November 1, 1976, Diedrich Wattenberg retired as director after 28 years and, at his suggestion, Dieter B. Herrmann was appointed as the new director of the observatory. Research into the history of astronomy was led by Jürgen Hamel, who worked at the Archenhold Observatory from 1978 to 1991.

Didactical works, textbooks on the subject of astronomy and astronomy-related chapters in textbooks for various natural sciences were written by Director Herrmann and his staff, led by the qualified astronomy teachers Dietmar Fürst and Oliver Schwarz (the latter later received a professorship for physics didactics at the University of Siegen and headed the working group "Astronomiedidaktik" working group / education committee of the German Astronomical Society).

=== Berlin re-united ===
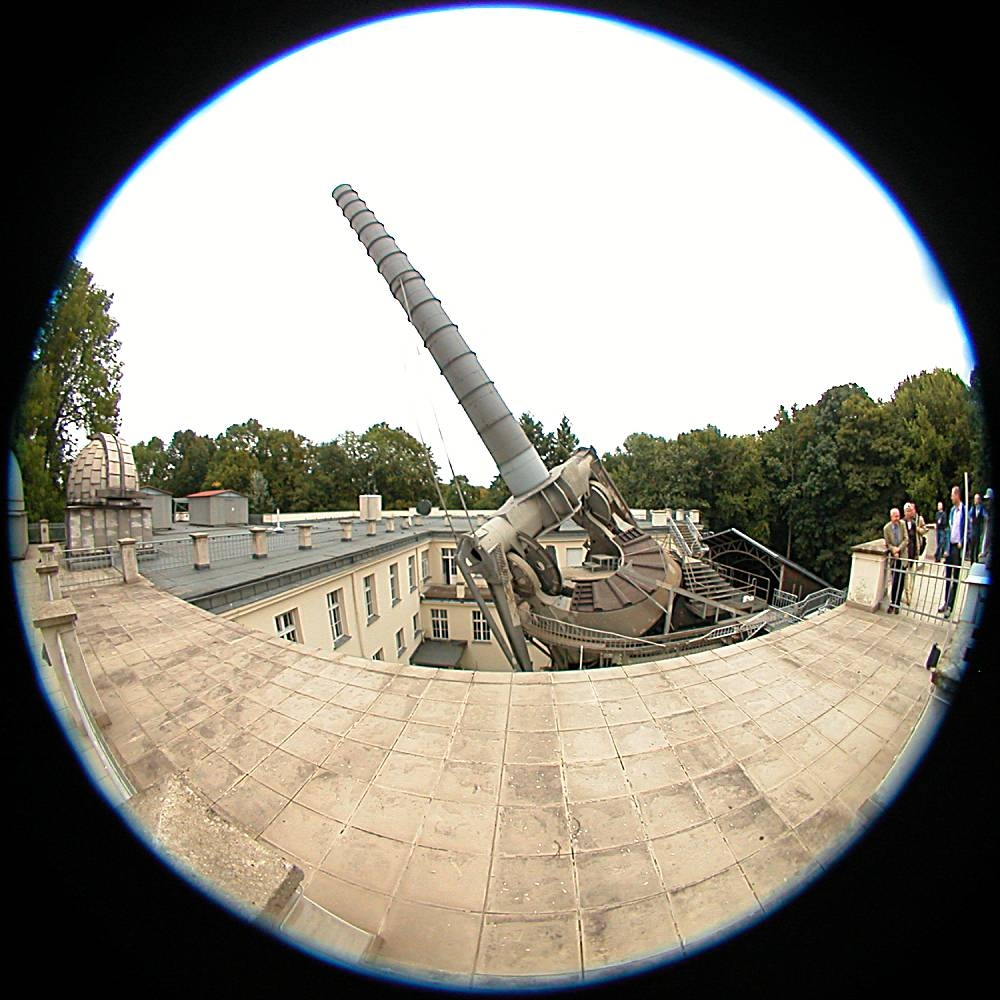
The telescope among the buildings.

After German reunification in 1990, the observatory came under control of the city's school administration. Significant repairs of the Great Refractor had to be carried out in 1989/1990 and 1995. As of 2018, the telescope remains operational and is available for night observing. The observatory underwent major refurbishment in 1995/1996. The exhibition was also completely revised.

Since 2002, the observatory belongs to the German Museum of Technology. Dieter B. Herrmann retired in 2005. The observatory was then led for a while by the head of the astronomy department of the technology museum, Klaus Staubermann. In 2009, Felix Lühning became director of the Archenhold Observatory.

=== Further activities ===
Since 1972, the Archenhold Observatory edits its own celestial almanac "Blick in die Sternenwelt" on the basis of the Nautical Almanac but computed specifically for the coordinates of the observatory in Treptow. The editor and author was 1972 to 2014 Eckehard Rothenberg; since 2014 other members of the local hobby astronomers' club continue his work.

As a support association, the astronomers's club also relaunched and continued the Archenhold Observatory publication series after German reunification. It had to be discontinued at the beginning of the 1990s because the research department(s) was dissolved, but was re-initiated in 2000 with a popular scientific-historical work by astronomer Susanne M Hoffmann.

The physicist and amateur astronomer Jürgen Rose built a radio telescope, a spark chamber and several devices for particle counting in the observatory as part of his commitment to the association and observatory. He uses these to investigate cosmic radiation in a completely automated robotic observation program.

== Equipment ==
Video recording of the Great Refractor

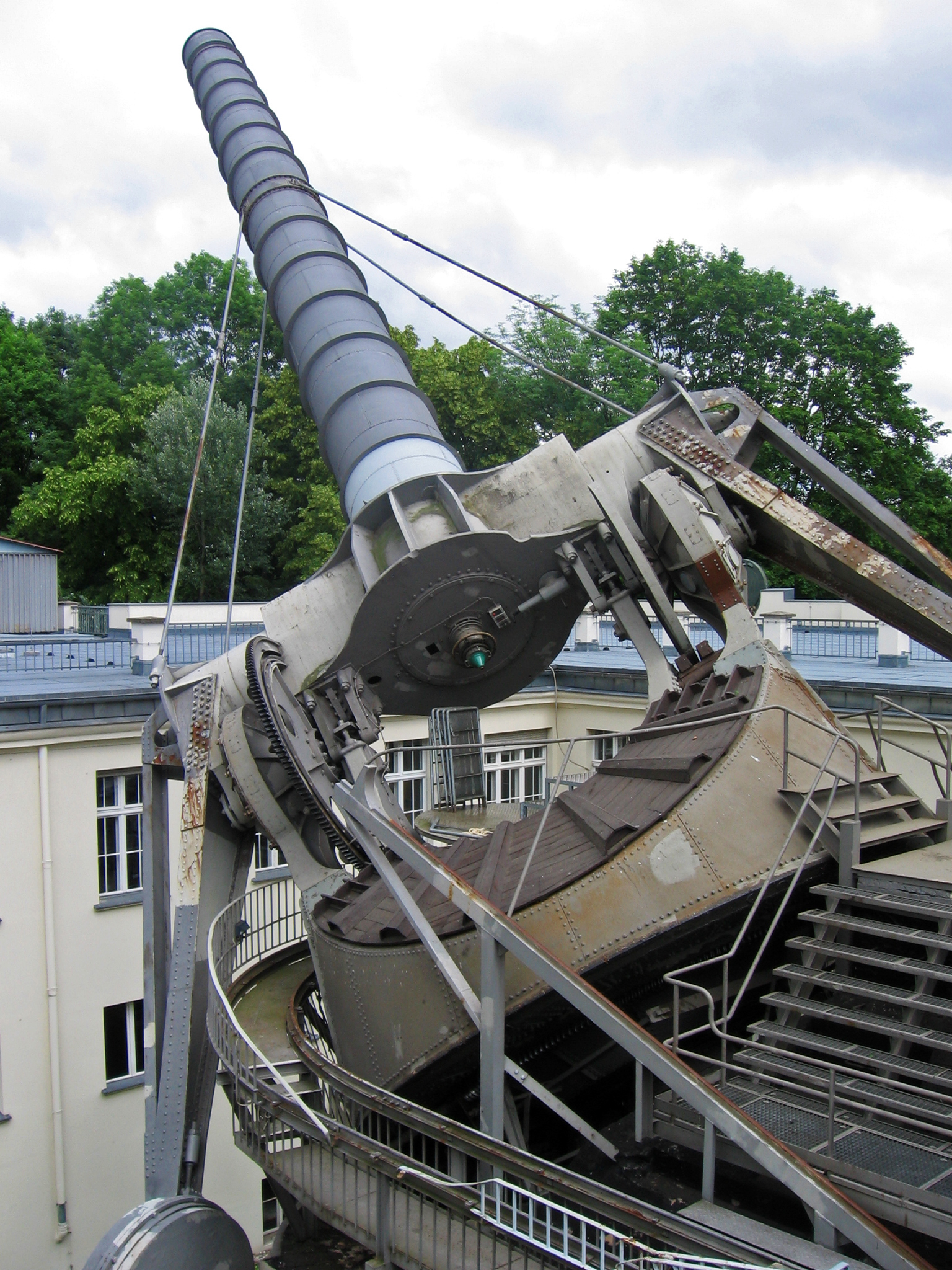
The Great Refractor of the Archenhold Observatory

=== Great Refractor ===
The Great Refractor was built in 1896 for the Great Industrial Exposition of Berlin. With an aperture of 68 cm (27 in), a focal length of 21 m (69 ft) and a movable mass of 130 metric tons, it is considered a masterpiece of technology. The lenses were made by C. A. Steinheil & Söhne. Since 1967, the telescope is a protected monument.

=== Zeiss Small Planetarium ===
The planetarium is located in an 8 m (26 ft) dome with 38 seats. In 1959 it was the first Zeiss Small Planetarium in the GDR. In 1982 it was replaced with the more modern ZKP-2 projector. In 1994 the planetarium room was refurbished.

=== Solar physics cabinet ===
The solar physics cabinet is situated in the grounds of the observatory. It was designed and built in 1965 by Diedrich Wattenberg and Edwin Rolf. A coelostat redirects the light from the Sun into the building. The sunlight is optionally dispersed into the spectral colours through four 60° prisms. With an H-alpha filter it is possible to observe prominences and active regions on the Sun.

=== Additional telescopes ===
In 1962, two observing domes were erected in the grounds north of the main building. These have diameters of 5 m (16 ft) and 3 m (9.8 ft), resp. They house a Zeiss Cassegrain telescope (500 mm (20 in) aperture, 7,500 mm (300 in) focal length) and a refractor with coudé focus (150 mm (5.9 in) aperture, 2,250 mm (89 in) focal length). Two further domes on the roof of the main building house an astrograph (120 mm (4.7 in) aperture, 600 mm (24 in) focal length) and the historic Urania Refractor of 1888, which was transferred from the Berlin Urania. Two further shelters with roll-off roofs on top of the main building contain a comet seeker (250 mm (9.8 in) aperture, 1,620 mm (64 in) focal length) and a Newtonian telescope (250 mm (9.8 in) aperture, 1,978 mm (77.9 in) focal length).

== See also ==
- List of astronomical observatories
