= Zeiss planetarium =

Zeiss planetarium may refer to:

- Zeiss Major Planetarium (German Zeiss-Großplanetarium), Berlin, Germany, built 1987
- Zeiss-Planetarium Jena, a planetarium in Jena, Germany, built 1926
