= Heino Eelsalu =

Estonian astronomer and science historian

Heino Eelsalu (8 May 1930 – 26 July 1998) was an Estonian astronomer and science historian.

Eelsalu was born in Tallinn in 1930. In 1954 he graduated from Tartu State University in mathematics. After graduating he worked at the Tartu Observatory.

His main fields of research were the structure of Galaxy, and stellar photometry.

He was a member of many international and local organisations, eg International Astronomical Union and Estonian Naturalists' Society.

== Works ==
- Astronoomia areng Eesti kultuuriloolise probleemina. // Teaduse ajaloo lehekülgi Eestist II (1976).
- Theoretical foundations of stellar statistics. Tallinn 1982.
- Johann Heinrich Mädler (1794–1874): Eine dokumentarische Biographie (with Dieter B. Herrmann). Berlin 1985.
- Ajastult ajastule. Tallinn 1985.
- Theory of basic galactic statistical research systems. Tallinn 1990.
- Rara astronomica in Estonia I-X (one of the authors). Tallinn 1977-1990.
- Astronoomialeksikon. Tallinn 1996.
