= Dieter B. Herrmann =

German astronomer and author (1939–2021)

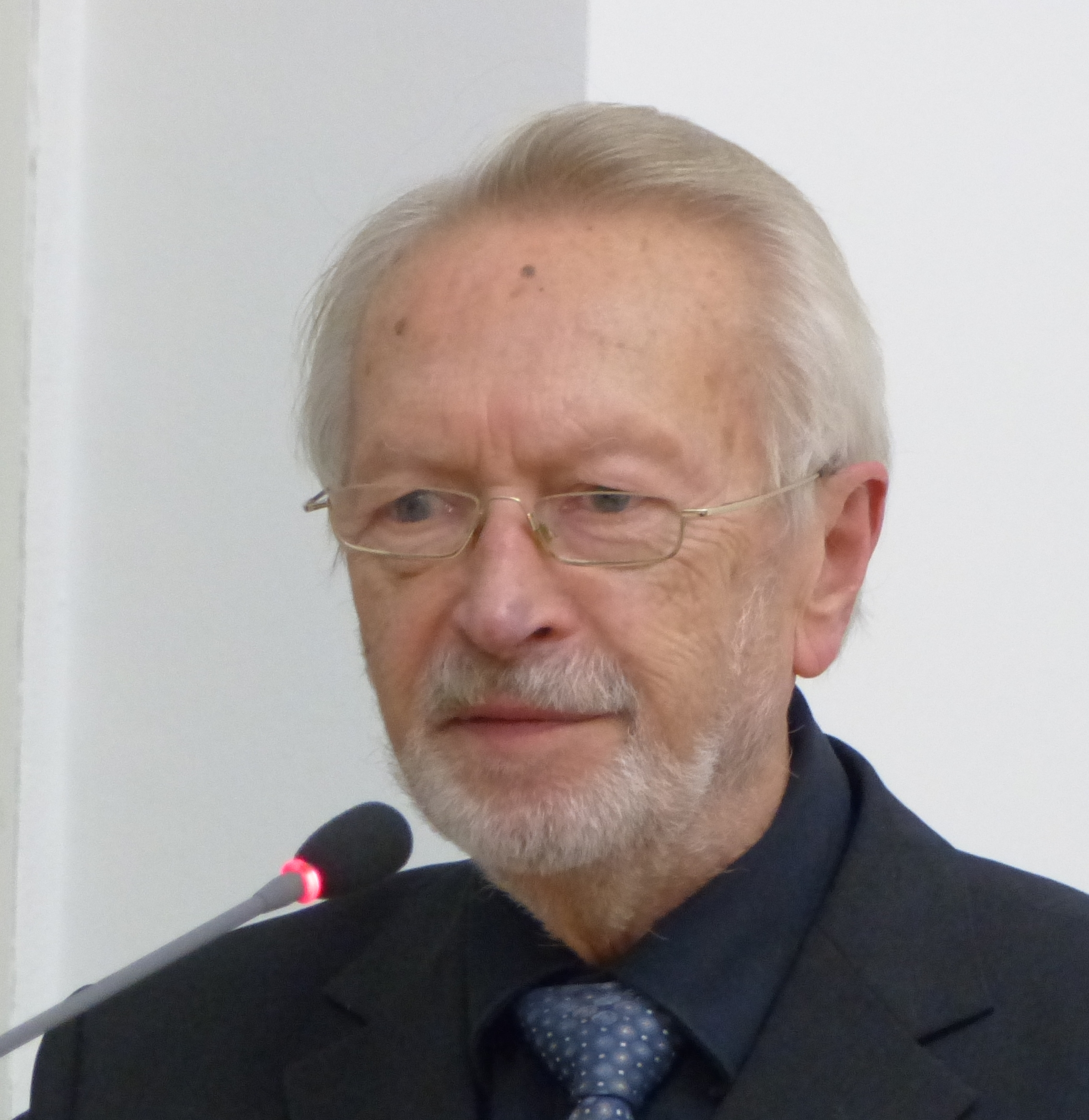
- Herrmann in 2015
- Born: Dieter Bernhard Herrmann; 3 January 1939; Berlin, Brandenburg, Prussia, Germany
- Died: 25 November 2021 (aged 82)
- Education: Humboldt University of Berlin
- Occupations: Astronomer; Academic teacher
- Organizations: Zeiss Major Planetarium; Deutscher Fernsehfunk

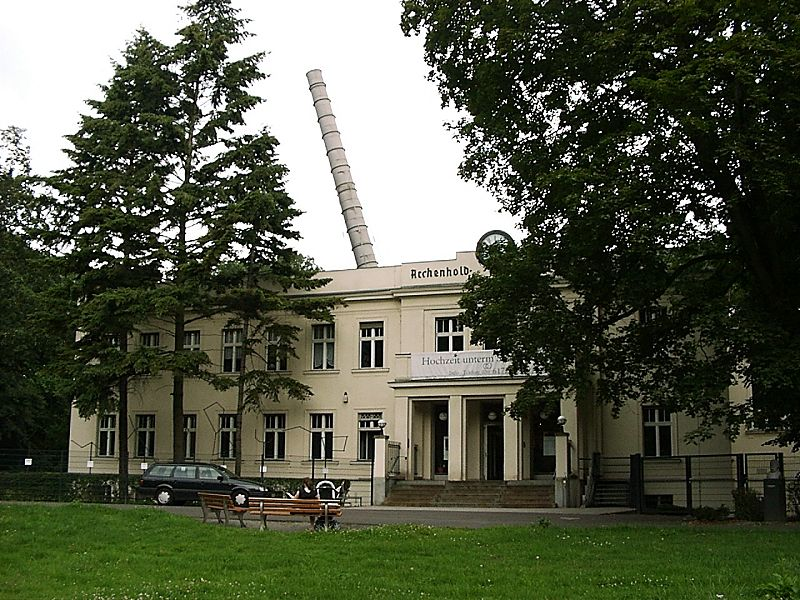
Archenhold Observatory in 2004

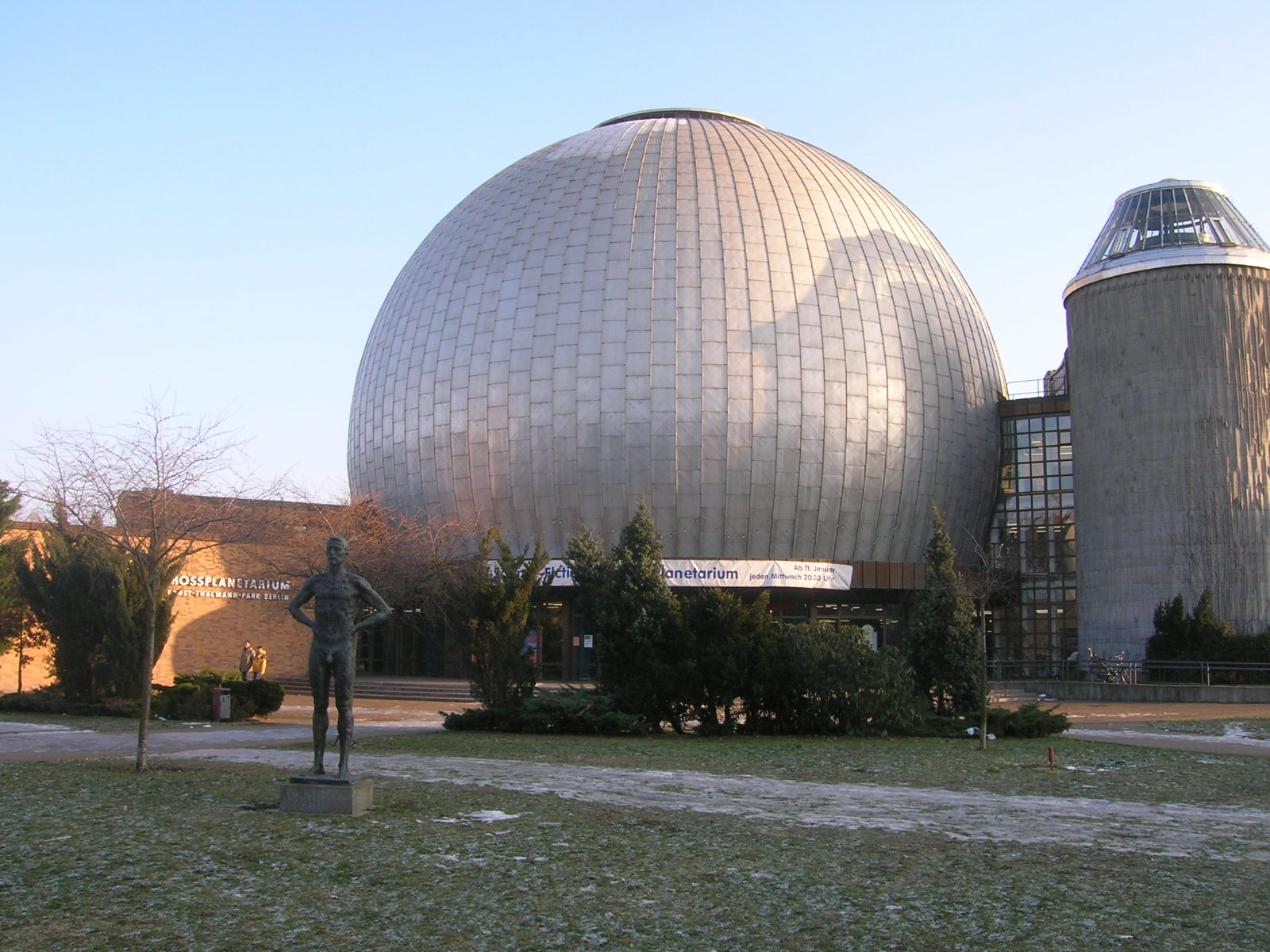
The Zeiss Major Planetarium in Berlin-Prenzlauer Berg

Dieter Bernhard Herrmann (3 January 1939 – 25 November 2021) was a German historian of astronomy and author of numerous popular science books on astronomy. He was director of the Zeiss Major Planetarium in Berlin from 1987 to 2004. In his scientific work he dealt with the early development of astrophysics and the application of quantitative methods in the history of science.

== Life and career ==
Born in Berlin, Germany, Herrmann studied physics at the Humboldt University of Berlin from 1957 to 1963. From 1963 to 1969, he was employed at the Staatliches Amt für Atomsicherheit und Strahlenschutz. In 1969, he obtained a doctorate (Dr. rer. nat.) at the Humboldt University on the topic The Emergence of Astronomical Journals in Germany, 1798–1821.

Herrmann was director of the Archenhold Observatory in Berlin-Alt-Treptow from 1 November 1976 to 30 September 2004, succeeding Diedrich Wattenberg. In 1986, he completed his habilitation (Dr. sc. phil.) and was appointed honorary professor. In 1987, he was the founding director of the associated Zeiss Major Planetarium in Berlin-Prenzlauer Berg. He also hosted the popular science programme "AHA" of Deutscher Fernsehfunk for 14 years, for which he was awarded the Golden Laurel of GDR Television three times.

Herrmann's work included extensive lecturing activities. He was the author of 45 books, 150 scientific and about 2,000 popular science publications, as well as the successful planetarium programmes "Phantastisches Weltall", "Sterne, Nebel, Feuerräder", "Als der Mond zum Schneider kam", "Die große Tour durch die Welt der Planeten" (premiere 1993).

Herrmann was a member of the International Astronomical Union, the European Astronomical Society, the Leibniz-Sozietät der Wissenschaften zu Berlin, the Berliner Wissenschaftliche Gesellschaft, the Astronomische Gesellschaft and other scientific associations. He was a member of the Science Council of the Society for the Scientific Investigation of Parasciences as well as on the Scientific Advisory Board of the Journal of Anomalistics published by the Society for Anomalistics.

From 2006 until January 2012, he was president of the Leibniz-Sozietät (since 2007 Leibniz-Sozietät der Wissenschaften zu Berlin). On 27 June 2012, he was elected to the board of Urania in Berlin. On 18 May 2012, Herrmann was appointed honorary member of the Gesellschaft Deutschsprachiger Planetarien.

From January 2010 to April 2015, Herrmann gave a monthly overview of the current starry sky in his video column "Herrmanns Himmelsblicke" on the website of the Märkische Oderzeitung. Since 26 September 2010, the star discovered on 11 January 2000 at the Volkssternwarte Drebach as a minor planet (103460) bears the name Dieterherrmann.

On 17 September 2019, Herrmann was awarded the prestigious Bruno H. Bürgel Award of the Astronomische Gesellschaft "for decisively shaping the public perception of astronomy by presenting inherently new astronomical results to the public over several decades". He was a member of the advisory board of the Study Foundation of the Berlin House of Representatives and was elected a member of the board in 2020.

== Personal life ==
From October 2004, Herrmann lived in Berlin as a freelance researcher and author. From 2008, he was married to the Berlin artist Sabine Heinz. Herrmann died at age 82 after a severe illness.

== Publications ==
Herrmann's publications are held by the German National Library, including:

- Geschichte der Astronomie von Herschel bis Hertzsprung. VEB Deutscher Verlag der Wissenschaften, Berlin, 1975, in English by the Cambridge University Press, Cambridge 1984; 3rd edition 1980, 4th edition under the title Geschichte der modernen Astronomie, Berlin 1984.
- Kosmische Weiten, Geschichte der Entfernungsmessung im Weltall. Johann Ambrosius Barth, Leipzig 1977, 4th edition Cologne 1990.
- Vom Schattenstab zum Riesenspiegel. 2000 Jahre Technik der Himmelsforschung. Verlag Neues Leben, Berlin 1978, 4th edition 1989.
- Entdecker des Himmels. Urania-Verlag, Leipzig Jena Berlin 1978, 4th edition 1990, also in Russian in 1981 by "Mir" as well as Hungarian in 1981 by "Gondolat" Edition.
- Besiedelt die Menschheit das Weltall? in: (Akzent-Reihe vol. 50) Urania-Verlag, Leipzig Jena Berlin 1981
- Ejnar Hertzsprung. Pionier der Sternforschung. with 41 illustrations, Springer, Berlin-Heidelberg New York 1994, 241 pages, ISBN 3-540-57688-6 (pocket book edition 2012).
- Sonne, Mond und Sterne. Franckh-Kosmos, Stuttgart 1995, 2nd edition: Kosmos, Stuttgart 2003.
- Antimaterie: Auf der Suche nach der Gegenwelt. Beck, Munich 1998, ISBN 3-406-44504-7 and 4th, updated edition 2009.
- Die Milchstraße. Das aktuelle Wissen über unsere Heimatgalaxie. Franckh-Kosmos, Stuttgart 2003, ISBN 3-440-09409-X.
- Astronomiegeschichte. Umfangreiche Sammlung von wissenschaftlichen Beiträgen zur Geschichte der Astronomie. Paetec, Frankfurt, 2004, ISBN 3-89818-346-7.
- Sterne der Traumzeit. Reiseminiaturen, Begegnungen mit der astronomischen Kultur der Länder Ägypten, Indien, Italien, Mexico, Frankreich und Australien. Duden Paetec, Frankfurt, 2005, ISBN 3-89818-367-X.
- Der Jugendbrockhaus Weltall und Raumfahrt. Mannheim 2007, ISBN 3-7653-3161-9.
- Die große Kosmos Himmelskunde. Planeten, Sterne, Galaxien – moderne Astronomie ganz verständlich. Stuttgart 2007, ISBN 978-3-440-10928-1.
- Astronom in zwei Welten. Autobiographie. Mitteldeutscher Verlag, Halle 2008, ISBN 978-3-89812-557-4.
- Der Zyklop. Die Kulturgeschichte des Fernrohrs. Westermann-Braunschweig 2009, ISBN 978-3-14-100860-9.
- Sonne, Mond und Sterne. Curis Abenteuer im Weltall. In: Kon Te Xis. Arbeitsheft. 2009, No. 1; PDF).
- "Ich bin mit jedem Lob einverstanden". Hanns Eisler im Gespräch 1960–1962. Salier Verlag, Leipzig 2009, ISBN 978-3-939611-32-5.
- Urknall im Labor. Wie Teilchenbeschleuniger die Natur simulieren. Springer, Berlin 2010, ISBN 978-3-642-10313-1.
- Planeten, Sterne, Galaxien. Ein Streifzug durch das Weltall. Illustrations by Vitali Konstantinov. Gerstenberg-Verlag Hildesheim 2014, 2nd edition 2017, ISBN 978-3-8369-5710-6, also in Spanish at Liberalia Ediciones, Santiago de Chile 2017 and Chinese at Red Dot Wisdom Cultural Development, Beijing 2018.
- Das Urknall-Experiment. Auf der Suche nach dem Anfang der Welt. Franckh-Kosmos Verlags-GmbH & Co. KG, Stuttgart 2014, ISBN 978-3-440-14455-8.
- Die Harmonie des Universums. Von der rätselhaften Schönheit der Naturgesetze. Franckh-Kosmos Verlags-GmbH & Co. KG, Stuttgart 2017, ISBN 978-3-440-15263-8.
- Himmelskunde. Eine Einführung in die Astronomie. Franckh-Kosmos Verlags-GmbH & Co. KG, Stuttgart 2018, ISBN 978-3-440-15837-1.
- Dieter B. Herrmann and Christian Gritzner (eds.): Beiträge zur Geschichte der Raumfahrt. Ausgewählte Vorträge der Raumfahrthistorischen Kolloquien 1986–2015. In: Abhandlungen der Leibniz-Sozietät der Wissenschaften, vol. 46. trafo Verlagsgruppe Dr. Wolfgang Weist, Wissenschaftsverlag, Berlin 2017, ISBN 978-3-86464-121-3
- Gerhard Banse, Dieter B. Herrmann, Herbert Hörz (eds.): 25 Jahre Leibniz-Sozietät der Wissenschaften zu Berlin. Reden der Präsidenten auf den Leibniz-Tagen 1993–2017. In: Abhandlungen der Leibniz-Sozietät der Wissenschaften, vol. 50. trafo Verlagsgruppe Dr. Wolfgang Weist, Wissenschaftsverlag, Berlin 2018, ISBN 978-3-86464-161-9
- Atlas astronomischer Traumorte: Entdeckungsreisen auf den Spuren der Sternkunde. Franckh-Kosmos Verlags, Stuttgart 2019, ISBN 978-3-440-16403-7
- Astronomie – Bildung – Philosophie. Ausgewählte Vorträge und Aufsätze 1995–2020. In: Abhandlungen der Leibniz-Sozietät der Wissenschaften, vol. 62, trafo-Verlagsgruppe, Wissenschaftsverlag Berlin, 2020, ISBN 978-3-86464-213-5.
