= Alice Archenhold =

German astronomer

- Born: 27 August 1874; Wiesbaden, Germany
- Died: 9 February 1943 (aged 68); Theresienstadt Ghetto, Czechoslovakia
- Spouse: Friedrich Simon Archenhold
- Scientific career
- Fields: Astronomy

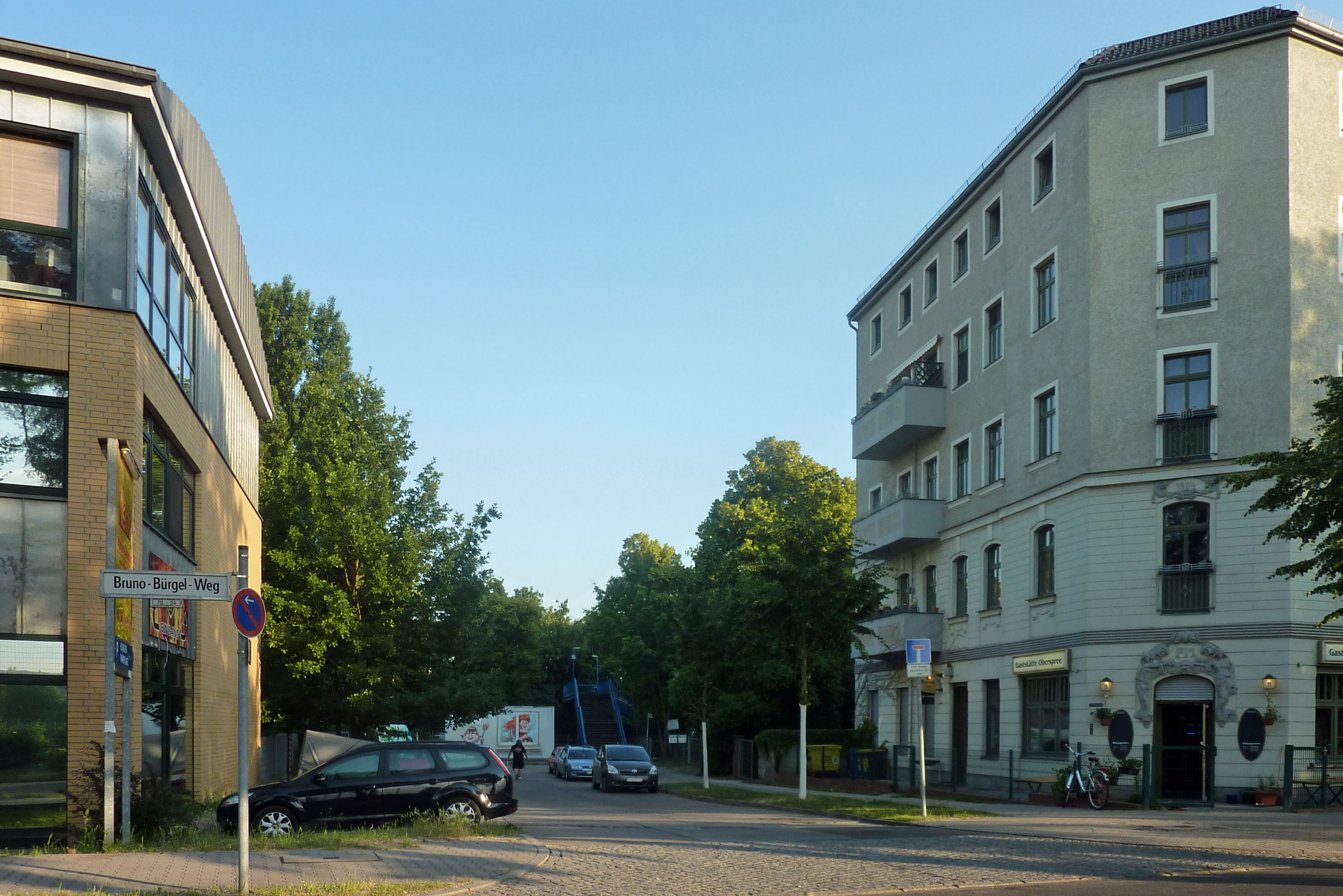
Alice-Archenhold-Weg in Berlin-Niederschöneweide.

Alice Archenhold (née Markus; 27 August 1874 – 9 February 1943) was a German astronomer whose husband was fellow astronomer Friedrich Simon Archenhold.

Alice Markus was born in Wiesbaden, Germany, and married Friedrich Simon Archenhold in July 1897 and lived in Berlin. They went on to have five children together.

Her sons, Günter, who became an astronomer, and Horst, both fled to England, but Alice was arrested and deported (along with her daughter Hilde) to Theresienstadt concentration camp, in Czechoslovakia, where she died on 9 February 1943.

She is commemorated on her husband's grave at the Zentralfriedhof Friedrichsfelde, Berlin.

In 2010 a street in Treptow-Köpenick was renamed after her as Alice Archenhold Weg.

== See also ==
- Photographs of Archenhold family: https://theskywasthelimit.de/en/history/
