= Akademie Verlag =

German publishing company

- Parent company: Walter de Gruyter
- Founded: 1946
- Founder: German Academy of Sciences Berlin
- Defunct: 2013
- Country of origin: Germany
- Headquarters location: Berlin
- Publication types: books, academic journals
- Nonfiction topics: Science
- Official website: www.degruyter.com

There also were unrelated publishing houses Akademischer Verlag (Hans-Dieter) Heinz in Stuttgart and Akademischer Verlag in (East-)Berlin, and there is the Jenaer Akademische Verlagsgesellschaft (JAVG).

Akademie Verlag (AV (Note: Seiffert uses AV as abbreviation for Akademie Verlag, however, this is also used for Akademische Verlagsgesellschaft (normally as AVG) by others.)) is a German scientific and academic publishing company, founded in 1946 in the Soviet-occupied eastern part of divided Berlin to facilitate the publication of works by and for the German Academy of Sciences Berlin.

Under the communist German Democratic Republic, from 1949 to 1990, it remained closely connected to the academy; unlike other publishing houses, it was not subject to direct control by the GDR ministry of culture. Still, it was regarded with suspicion in the West due to communist influence. Most of the output was sold in East Germany and the Eastern Bloc. Since 1957, Gottfried Wilhelm Leibniz, the founder of the Prussian Academy of Sciences in 1700, and „theoria cum praxi“ are used as symbols.

Since the 1970s, several volumes of the Nicolaus Copernicus Gesamtausgabe (complete edition) have been published by Akademie Verlag, covering many documents from and about Nicolaus Copernicus in detail. Astronomische Nachrichten (Astronomical Notes), one of the first international journals in the field of astronomy, founded in 1821, was published by Akademie Verlag for several decades as well as Physica Status Solidi, founded in 1961.

After the fall of the Berlin Wall, the employees rejected their boss and elected one of themselves as successor. As it had managed to build enough of a reputation in the West, several offers were made for Akademie Verlag, and the new German states (including Berlin) sold it on 3 January 1991 to VCH Verlagsgruppe Weinheim. As a result, of the 170 employees in 1991, only 40 remained until the 50th anniversary in 1996. The rather broad range of publications was reduced to focus on philosophy, history, political and cultural sciences, history of art, literature, and lingual sciences plus mathematics and physics.

When John Wiley & Sons took over VCH, the natural scientific branch of Akademie Verlag was moved to Wiley-VCH, while the humanities section, including its name and logo, was transferred on 1 October 1997 to R. Oldenbourg Verlag, which in 2004 was acquired by Cornelsen Verlag. In 2013, Walter de Gruyter acquired Akademie and Oldenbourg from Cornelsen. The publisher Walter De Gruyter is digitizing the archive of the Akademie Verlag. By 2025, this will make more than 15,000 works from the humanities, social sciences, and natural sciences digitally available for the first time.
