= Friedrich Simon Archenhold =

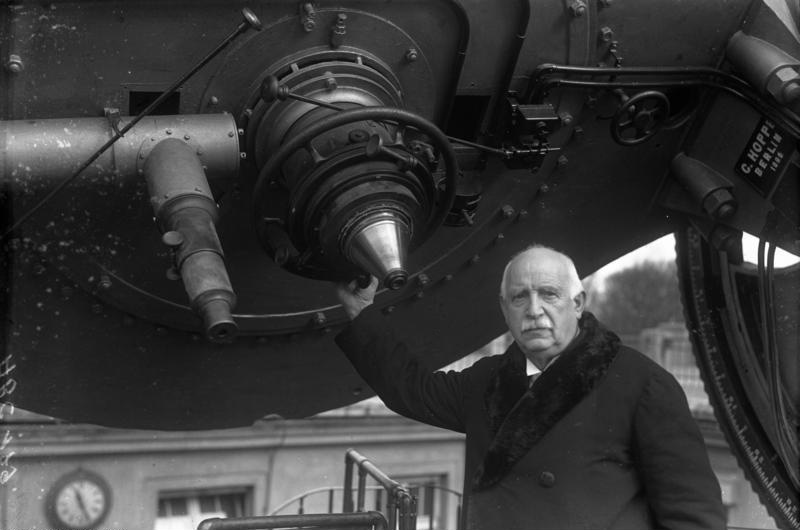
Friedrich Simon Archenhold.

Friedrich Simon Archenhold (2 October 1861 in Lichtenau, Kingdom of Prussia – 14 October 1939 in Berlin) was an astronomer who founded the Treptow Observatory (today the Archenhold Observatory) in Berlin-Treptow. He graduated from the Realgymnasium in Lippstadt before entering Friedrich Wilhelm University in 1882, where he and Wilhelm Förster founded the Urania Society at the Berlin University Observatory.

== Largest telescope ==
On the basis of Archenhold's plans, the world's longest moving refracting telescope was built with a focal length of 21 meters. The telescope was part of the Great Industrial Exposition of Berlin, a world's fair. The giant telescope was constructed in Treptow, a suburb of Berlin. The telescope was opened to the public on 1 May 1896 in a temporary wooden structure which was completed in September.

== Public observatory ==
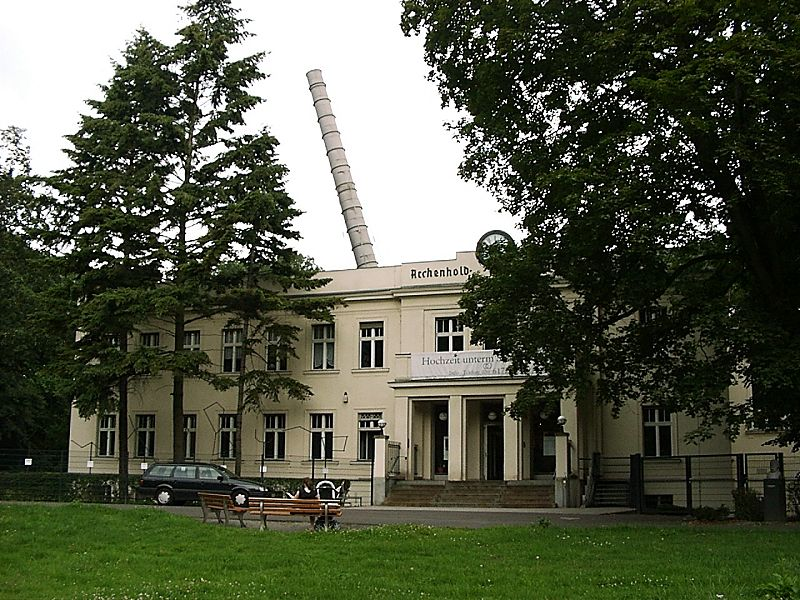
Archenhold Observatory at Berlin totday, the building is the original one from 1908.

By 1908 Archenhold had raised the funds to replace the wooden structure with the building that stands today. Some of the funds came from admission fees to lectures but he also was able to secure funds from the Scottish American philanthropist Andrew Carnegie.

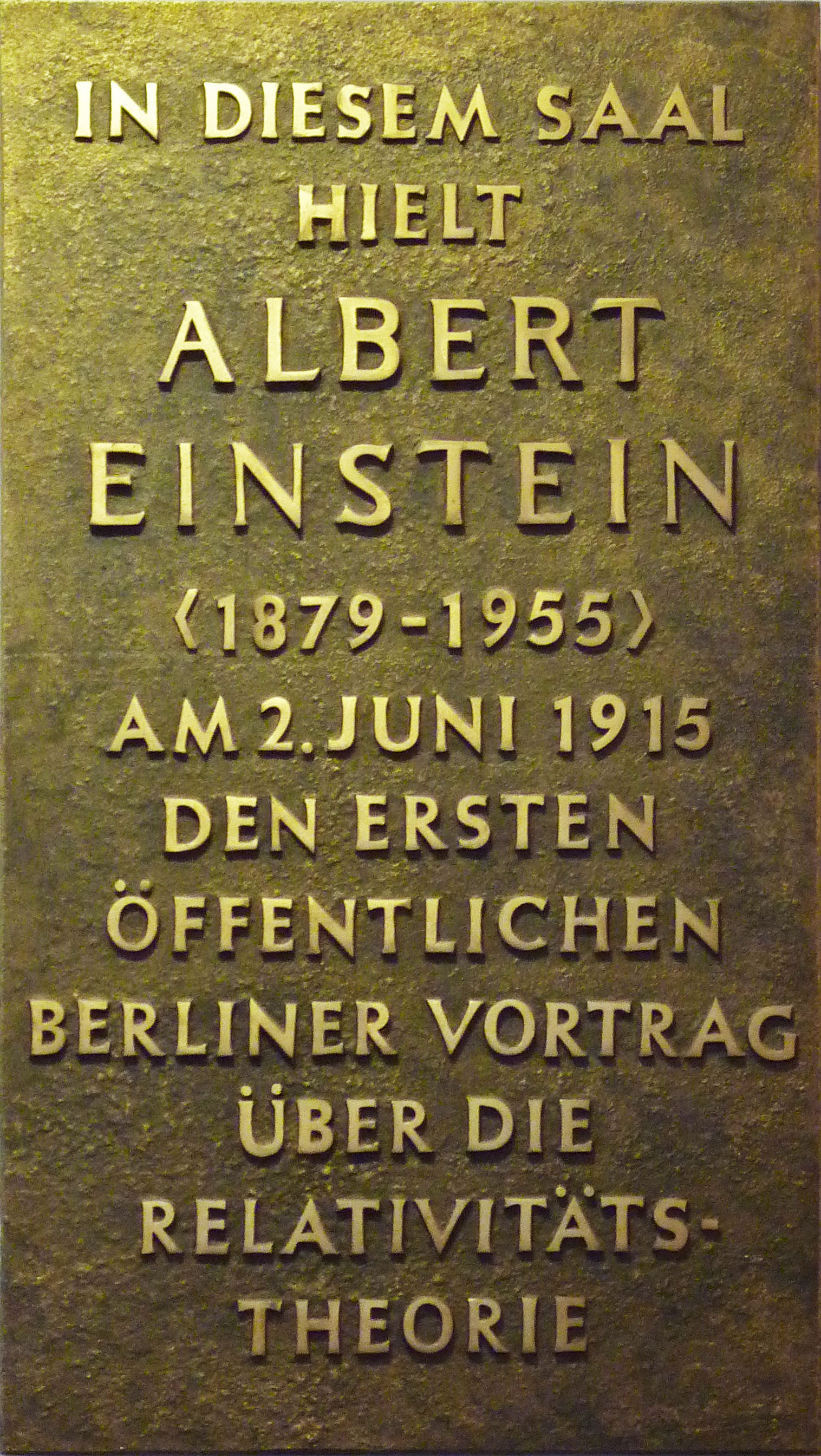
In Archenhold's observatory, Einstein spoke publicly about his yet unpublished theory of general relativity.

Archenhold was able to attract numerous well-known scientists and researchers for guest lectures at the Observatory. Perhaps the most famous was Albert Einstein who gave his first public lecture on the theory of relativity on 2 June 1915.

Like Wilhelm Foerster, Archenhold was interested in making scientific knowledge accessible to lay audiences. In addition to his support for the Urania Society, he was a member of various middle-class associations devoted to popularizing science.

During 1920 Dr. Archenhold bought a fisherman's house with adobe walls and wooden cladding in the Baltic village of Bansin. When the long summer nights reduced his observation time F. S. Archenhold would take his family to his summer house in Bansin. Here he worked on the magazines and papers that he published at the observatory.

== History of the family ==
By 1938 the Nazi party confiscated the home from the family. His widow Alice Archenhold and daughter Hilde died at Theresienstadt.

When the Russians defeated the Nazis the property was used by the community. The Observatory was named after Archenhold in 1946 as the Archenhold Sternwarte (Archenhold Observatory).

The Archenhold family had no right to recover any of the 125 acres of land or house until the fall of the Berlin Wall in 1989. His summer house on Seestraße, 63 is still standing, but it is in very poor condition. The old house in Bansin is now owned by his granddaughter.

After the reunification of Germany, the Archenhold Observatory became part of the Deutsches Technikmuseum.

Archenhold is buried in Berlin's Friedrichsfelde Cemetery.
