= Ernst-Thälmann-Park =

Park in Berlin

Coordinates: 52°32′17″N 13°26′02″E

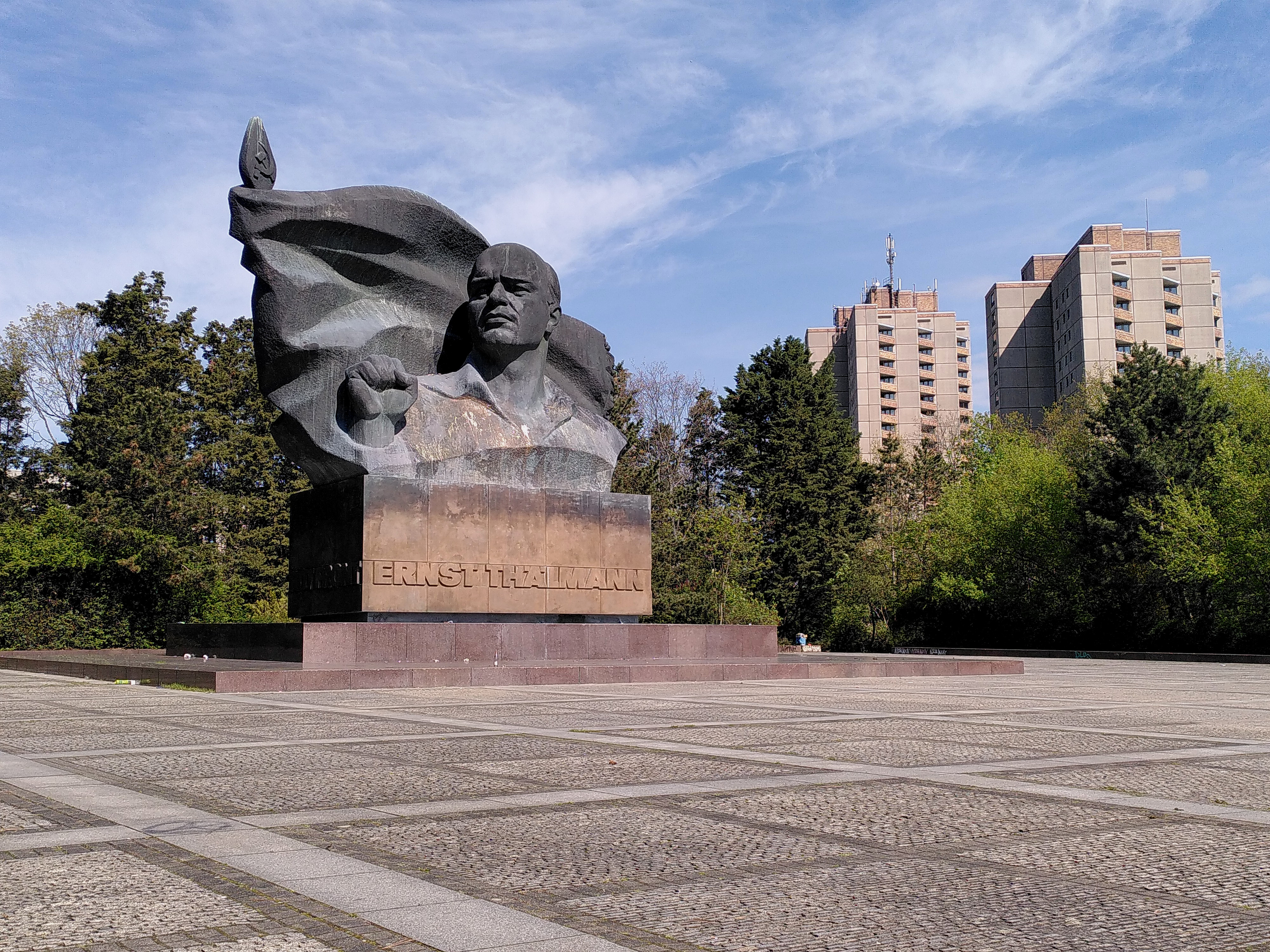
Ernst Thälmann monument and two of the residential houses in the park

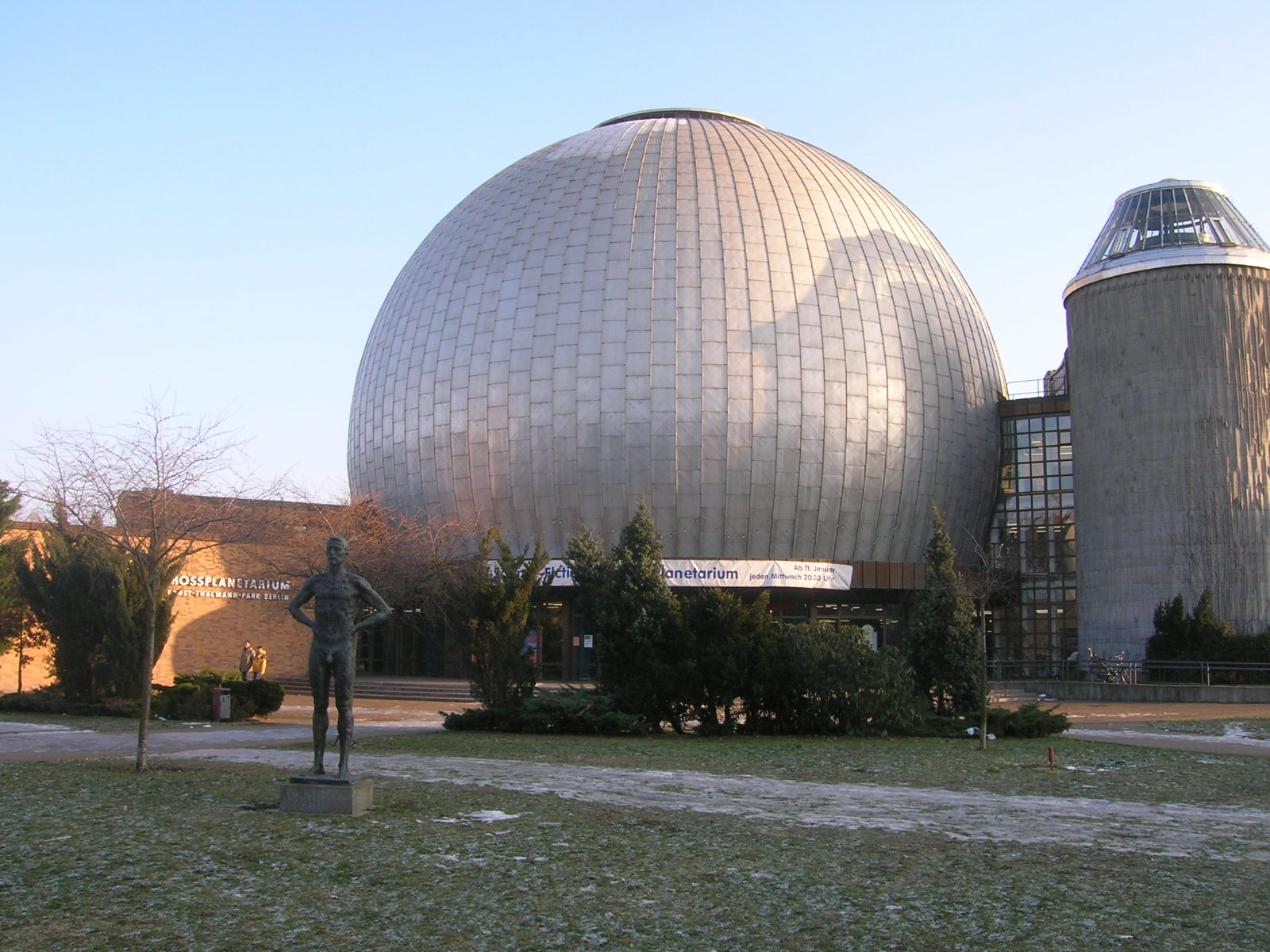
Zeiss Major Planetarium

Ernst-Thälmann-Park is a park in the centre of the Prenzlauer Berg district in Berlin. It was laid out in 1986 at the site of a former coal gas plant and named after the former Communist party leader Ernst Thälmann (1886–1944).

The former plant, built in 1874, was closed in 1981, with the last gasometer demolished in 1984. In honor of Berlin's 750-year jubilee, the East German government drew up plans for an "inhabited park", including a memorial, a public pool, a planetarium, a school, and a housing estate for 4,000 residents. The park was inaugurated on 16 April 1986, Thälmann's hundredth birthday. The soil and groundwater were extensively contaminated with cyanides, phenols and tar that had to be cleared by excavation and bioremediation after German reunification. Though there had been some discussion about the name, a majority of local inhabitants voted against a change in 1997. Today the park features public houses as well as art galleries and a small theatre at the former administrative building of the gas plant.

The 14 m (46 ft) Ernst Thälmann bronze monument was created by Soviet sculptor Lev Kerbel between 1981 and 1986. Some plaques with political slogans were removed in the 1990s. The monument remains a protected landmark today.

Since the early 2000s, the Ernst Thälmann bronze monument has become an internationally famous skateboarding spot. Memorable skateboarders such as Dylan Rieder and Kenny Hopf have performed at the venue, with Hopf filming a video there during the COVID-19-lockdown in 2020.
