= Diedrich Wattenberg =

German astronomer (1909–1996)

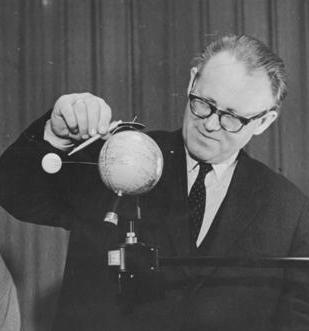
- Diedrich Wattenberg explaining the trajectory of a Soviet lunar rocket to a group of school children (1959)
- Born: 13 June 1909; Burgdamm (Bremen), Germany
- Died: 26 November 1996; Berlin-Mahlsdorf, Germany
- Occupation: Astronomer

Diedrich Wattenberg (13 June 1909 – 26 November 1996) was a German astronomer. He was a prolific populariser, writer and speaker on his subject, becoming in the 1950s a familiar presence on radio and, later, television programmes.

== Life ==
Wattenberg was born in a downstream suburb of Bremen in 1909. His father was a coppersmith. For economic reasons there was no possibility of his attending a secondary school, and he therefore trained for work as a government official. A decisive experience came in 1924 when Wattenberg attended a presentation by the writer Bruno H. Bürgel, who was reading extracts from his autobiography, Vom Arbeiter zum Astronomen ("From a worker to an astronomer"). In 1928, he got to know Friedrich Simon Archenhold at the Treptow Observatory (as it was then called) in Berlin. Wattenberg quickly became a regular contributor to a journal called Das Weltall ("The Universe") of which Archenhold was the editor in chief. Largely self-taught, during the 1930s he was writing regularly on astronomy.

In 1946 the Treptow Observatory was renamed to honour Archenhold, and on 1 June 1948 Diedrich Wattenberg was appointed Director of the Archenhold Observatory in succession to Hans Kienle, who a couple of years later moved to Heidelberg following the foundation, in 1949, of West and East Germany as separate stand-alone states. The observatory was in Potsdam, which since 1945 had been part of the designated Soviet occupation zone and from 1949 till 1989 would be included in East Germany. In addition to his Potsdam appointment, in 1948 Diedrich was appointed President of the Bremen centred Olbers Society, an astronomical group of which he had been a member since 1927. He also belonged to the Berlin Astronomical Society. The year after Wattenberg took over at the observatory, the first copy of a regular observatory newsletter under the name Mitteilungen appeared. Also in 1949 he founded the Astronomical News Service ("Astronomischen Nachrichtendienst") in response to what he saw as a shortage of newspapers and books on his topic. Arguably of even great importance were the short books and brochures which he had been publishing since 1947, giving wide public access to developments in the field of astronomical research, at a time when many people were living as refugees and organised entertainment was in short supply. He also regularly contributed material to enthusiasts' magazines including Die Sterne, Die Himmelswelt, Natur und Kultur, Stimmen der Zeit and Das Weltall. On 23 August 1951 his contribution was recognised with the award of the Goethe Prize by the Berlin city authorities.

Wattenberg continued in charge at the Archenhold Observatory until November 1976, the month of his 67th birthday, heading up the reconstruction necessary after 1945. He continued to write, so that by the end of his career he had published 2,800 pieces of written work, and he continued to make appearances on the broadcast media. The focus of his work became, increasingly, the history of astronomy. It was as a result of an initiative by Wattenberg that the history of astronomy appeared on the school curricula in the country's Polytechnic Secondary Schools for children in Years 9 and 10.

== Awards and honours ==
Diedrich Wattenberg received the Patriotic Order of Merit in silver (1964), the Leibniz Medal (1980), and the Medal of the Town of Bremen for Arts and Science (1995).

== Autobiography ==
Diedrich Wattenberg's autobiography appeared in 1984 under the title Starry heaven above me - the inextricable in my life ("Gestirnter Himmel über mir – Unverlierbares aus meinem Leben").
