= Leibniz Society of Sciences =

German-speaking scientific society

- Leibniz-Sozietät der Wissenschaften zu Berlin
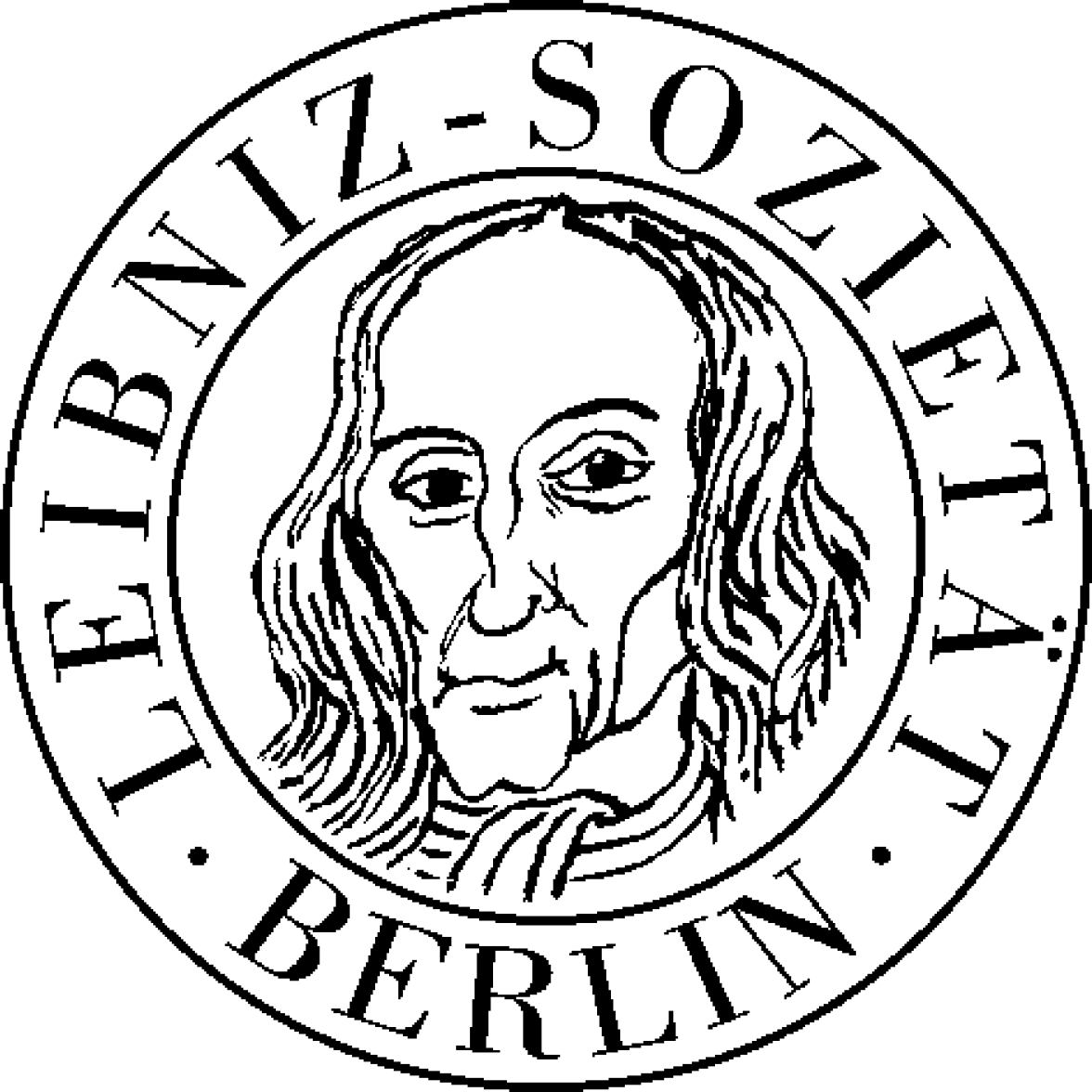
- Seal of the Leibniz Society
- Named after: Gottfried Wilhelm Leibniz
- Predecessor: Prussian Academy of Sciences; Akademie der Wissenschaften der DDR
- Formation: 1993
- Founded at: Berlin
- Type: Nonprofit
- Purpose: Support of science and research
- Location: Berlin, Germany
- Official language: German
- Leader: Gerda Haßler
- Main organ: Sitzungsberichte der Leibniz-Sozietät, Abhandlungen der Leibniz-Sozietät, Leibniz Online
- Funding: Member dues, donations, public funds
- Website: leibnizsozietaet.de

The Leibniz-Sozietät der Wissenschaften zu Berlin is a German-speaking association of scientists founded in Berlin in 1993 in the legal form of a registered association. It is dedicated to interdisciplinary and transdisciplinary exchange and the discussion of fundamental problems in science and society. In its self-image, it is ‘an association of outstanding natural scientists, scholars in the humanities, social scientists and technicians working according to the classical principle of the European academies’ The association continues the activities of the Academy of Sciences of the GDR with personnel continuity.

== History of origin ==
The Leibniz-Sozietät was constituted in its current legal form on April 15, 1993, as a registered non-profit association.

The Leibniz-Sozietät bears its name in memory of Gottfried Wilhelm Leibniz as the initiator and first president of the Electoral Brandenburg Society of Sciences founded in 1700, who developed the learned society in close cooperation with Daniel Ernst Jablonski as vice-president (later president; namesake of a medal of the Leibniz-Sozietät). This society gave rise to the Academy of Sciences in Berlin, which had various names. The best-known include Académie Royale des Sciences et Belles-Lettres (from 1746), Preußische Akademie der Wissenschaften (up to 1945), Deutsche Akademie der Wissenschaften zu Berlin (DAW, 1946-1972 and Akademie der Wissenschaften der DDR (AdW, 1972–1991).

With the Unification Treaty of 1990, the Academy of Sciences of the GDR as a learned society was separated from the research institutes and other institutions and dissolved in 1992. The research institutes and institutions existed as institutions of the federal states until December 31, 1991, unless they had previously been dissolved or converted.

According to the Unification Treaty, the decision as to how the learned society was to be continued was to be made under state law. The Berlin Senate Department for Science and Research decided that the learned society of the Academy of Sciences of the GDR was not to be regarded as the bearer of the tradition of the Berlin Academy, that a future Academy of Sciences in Berlin could not build on this institution and that a new constitution was unavoidable. The Berlin-Brandenburg Academy of Sciences and Humanities (BBAW) was therefore constituted on March 28, 1993. Following the State Treaty on the Berlin-Brandenburg Academy of Sciences and Humanities of 1992, this academy took over the assets and infrastructural facilities (library, archive, curatorship) of the scholarly society of the former Academy of Sciences and Humanities of the GDR and continued its long-term and editorial projects.

At the time of German reunification, the Academy of Sciences of the GDR had around 400 members in its learned society. 122 former members of the AdW, who were not accepted by the newly founded BBAW, founded the registered association Leibniz-Sozietät e. V. (from 2007 Leibniz-Sozietät der Wissenschaften zu Berlin e. V.) on April 15, 1993. Through the annual election of new members, the number of members has increased to over 300, which has also changed its structure. The association is funded by contributions, donations and grants from its members. It sees itself as a successor organisation to the scholarly society of the Academy of Sciences of the GDR.

There is an ongoing controversy as to whether the Leibniz-Sozietät or the Berlin-Brandenburg Academy of Sciences and Humanities should be regarded as the legitimate successor organization to the Societät der Wissenschaften, which was founded in 1700. The Leibniz-Sozietät refers to the continuity of personnel, the Berlin-Brandenburg Academy of Sciences and Humanities to the political mandate.

== Purpose ==
The Leibniz-Sozietät is a free association of natural and technical scientists, mathematicians, physicians as well as scholars in humanities and social scientists. It is linked to the Brandenburgische Sozietät der Wissenschaften (Brandenburg Society of Sciences and Humanities) through its members and their scientific work, which has been uninterrupted for centuries. The society builds on the independent research of its members and offers a forum for discussion and publicity. In particular, the members and guests foster interdisciplinary and transdisciplinary discourse as well as the discussion of current fundamental problems of science and society. Through its work, the Society strives to make an appropriate contribution to intellectual life in present times.

The purpose of the Leibniz-Sozietät is to cultivate and promote the sciences in the tradition of Gottfried Wilhelm Leibniz and the public interest. To this end, the Leibniz-Sozietät organises its scientific events to present the scientific results of its members and guests, in particular for interdisciplinary discussion at a high scientific level. All scientific events of the Leibniz-Sozietät are open to the public.

The elected members of the Leibniz-Sozietät also carry out joint research projects with friends and guests of the Leibniz-Sozietät. In this context, graduation theses and other forms of results can be supervised, presented for scientific discussion and published.

Through all its activities, the Leibniz-Sozietät selflessly promotes the general public in the intellectual field. It represents and defends science against all anti-scientific endeavours. The Leibniz-Sozietät reports publicly on its activities on the traditional “Leibniz Day” every year. The Leibniz-Sozietät also publishes two scientific publication series as well as an online journal and online communications.

== Events ==
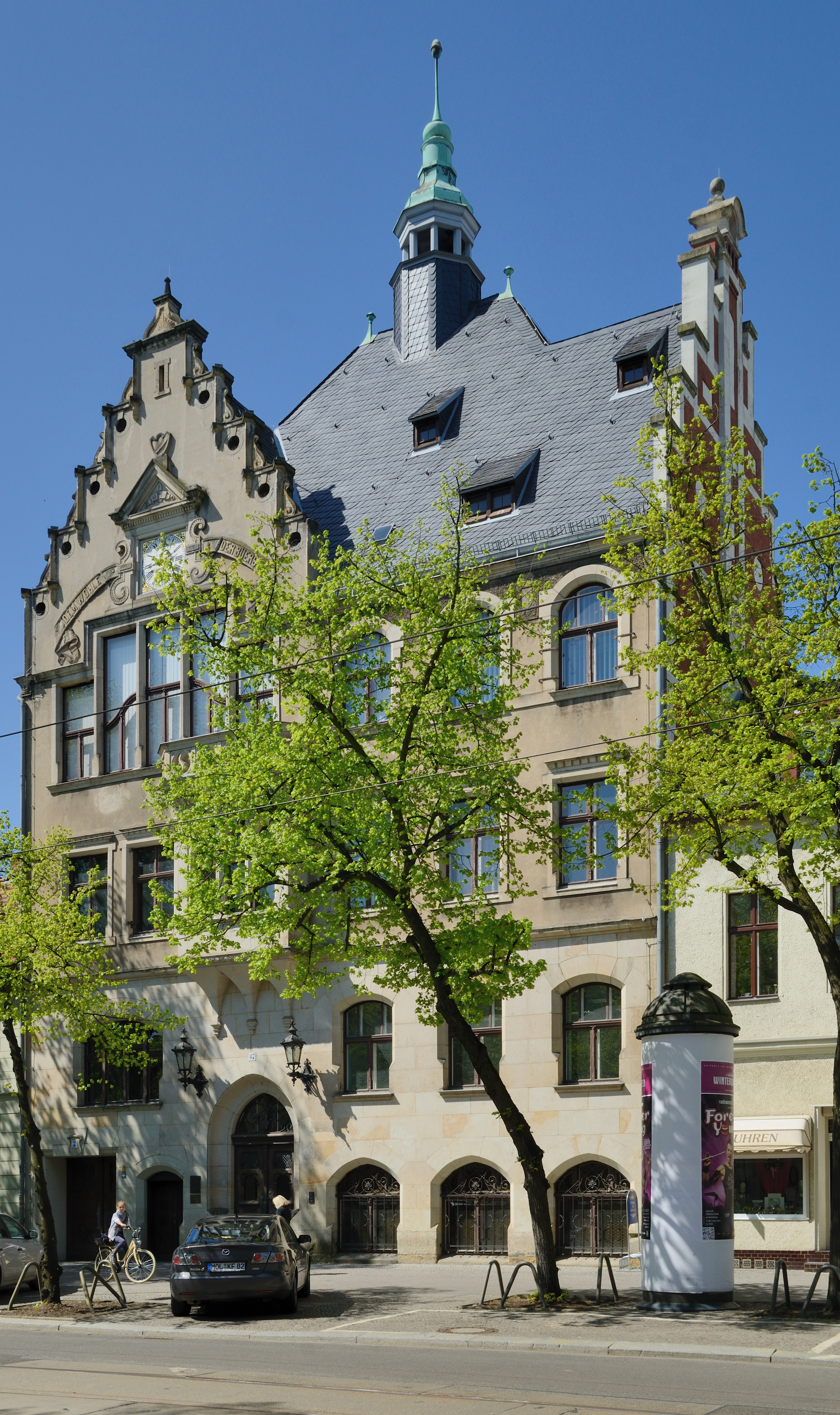
Since 2022, the majority of the scientific events of the Leibniz Society takes place in the townhall of Berlin-Friedrichshagen.

The members of the Leibniz-Sozietät gather monthly for public meetings, at which scientific lectures are held and discussed, and they organise the yearly “Leibniz Day” close to the birthday of G. W. Leibniz on 1 July, which had already been established in the academy's statute of 1812 and which also serves as a public accountability event.

The meetings of the Sozietät take place as interdisciplinary and transdisciplinary events in the two classes “Natural and Technical Sciences”, which also includes mathematics and life sciences/medicine, as well as “Social Sciences and Humanities” and in the “Plenum”. In addition, scientific colloquia, conferences and other scientific events with international participation are held.

In ten working groups, the members, together with other specialist colleagues and young scientists, deal with central issues of science and society. The working groups are particularly active in the following areas: History of Science and Academia, Pedagogy, Social Analysis and Classes, Earth, Mining and Environmental, Space and Astro Sciences, Principle of Simplicity, Vormärz and 1848 Revolution Research, Tolerance, Time and Evolution, General Technology and Emergent Systems, Information and Society. The results achieved, together with their public discussion, also provide suggestions for future scientific strategy and for shaping policy and society.

In order to initiate and promote “interdisciplinary or cross-disciplinary projects”, the Leibniz-Sozietät works together with other scientific institutions in Germany and abroad, usually on the basis of agreements of cooperation.

== Publications ==
Since 1994, the Leibniz-Sozietät has published its findings in the Leibniz-Sozietät's meeting reports and, since 1999, also in the Abhandlungen der Leibniz-Sozietät (Mémoires of the Leibniz Society) series; both are published by trafo Wissenschaftsverlag, Berlin.

The proceedings and all issues of Leibniz Online are available for download from the Leibniz-Sozietät website and have a DOI. The volumes of the proceedings are listed and occasionally provided with details of the authors and content. Meetings, colloquia and other events are announced and prepared by the publication of materials and full texts.

== Members ==
In 1993, 122 former members of the Academy of Sciences of the GDR founded the Leibniz-Sozietät e. V. association (since 2007 Leibniz-Sozietät der Wissenschaften zu Berlin e. V.). On December 31, 2023, the number of members was 299, 45 of whom were previously members of the GDR Academy. All other members have been elected by co-option since 1994. The Leibniz-Sozietät accepts members from all countries.

== Honorary Members ==
- Abdusalam Gusejnow (Moskau)
- Sigmund Jähn
- Georg Katzer
- Hiroshi Kawai (Japan)
- Werner Zorn

== Presidium ==
Presidents:

- 1993–1998 Samuel Mitja Rapoport
- 1998–2006 Herbert Hörz, seit 2009 Ehrenpräsident
- 2006–2012 Dieter B. Herrmann
- 2012–2019 Gerhard Banse
- 2019–2020 Rainer E. Zimmermann
- seit 2021 Gerda Haßler

The Vice Presidents are Wolfgang Methling and Dorothee Röseberg. The secretaries are Jochen Fleischhacker and Gerhard Pfaff. The treasurer is Michael Rodi, the head of the office is the chemist Klaus Buttker.

== Awards ==
The Leibniz-Sozietät awards the following honors and prizes:

- Ehrenmitglied der Leibniz-Sozietät
- Ehrenurkunde der Leibniz-Sozietät
- Gottfried-Wilhelm-Leibniz-Medaille
- Daniel-Ernst-Jablonski-Medaille
- Samuel-Mitja-Rapoport-Kooperationspreis

== Funding ==
The Leibniz-Sozietät is funded by membership fees, a foundation of the Friends of the Leibniz-Sozietät e. V. as well as grants and donations. Since 2004, it has received state funding from the Berlin Senate Department for Economics, Technology and Research.
