= Zeiss Major Planetarium =

Planetarium in Prenzlauer Berg, Berlin, Germany

Coordinates: 52°32′34.75″N 13°25′40.75″E

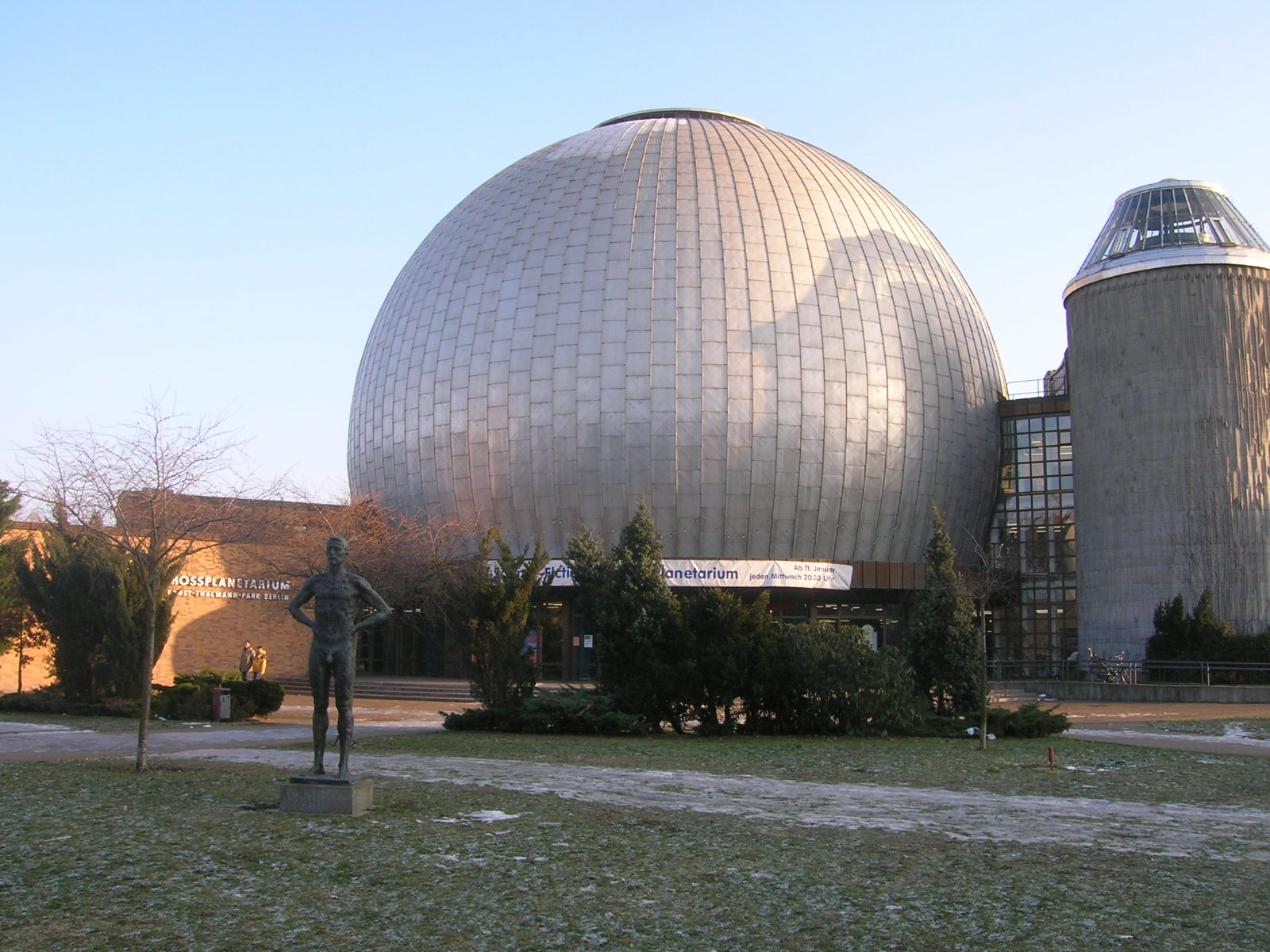
The Zeiss Major Planetarium Berlin

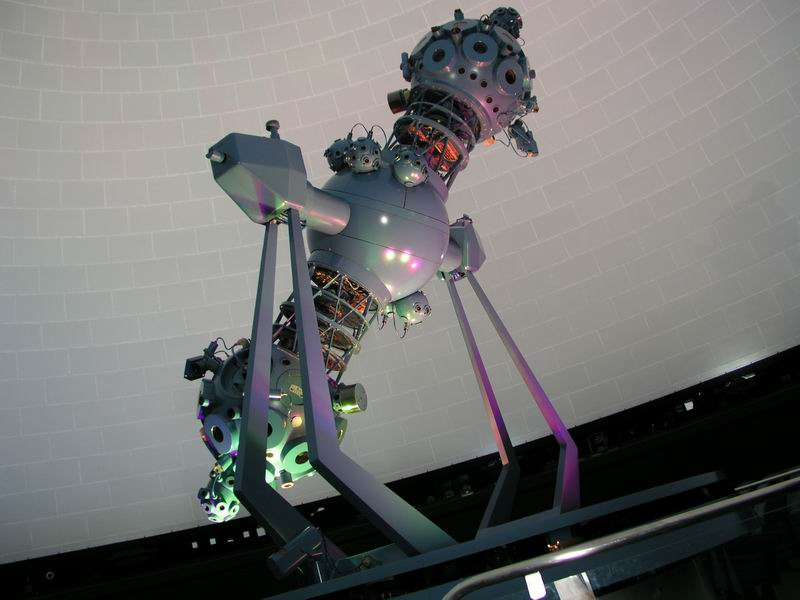
The planetarium's former projector (decommissioned in 2014)

The Zeiss Major Planetarium (German Zeiss-Großplanetarium) is a planetarium in Berlin, and one of the largest modern stellar theatres in Europe. It is located on the borders of the Ernst-Thälmann-Park housing estates in the Prenzlauer Berg locality of Berlin.

== History ==
It was one of the last buildings built in the GDR, constructed in 1987, the 750th anniversary of Berlin. Planning for the area commenced with old gas works to be torn down by 1981. The anniversary gave an opportunity to the Communist government to create a new style of housing estate with decorative high-rise residential buildings, a cultural centre with restaurants, and a planetarium supposed to be larger than the old one in the Archenhold Observatory of Berlin.

The building was designed by architect Erhardt Gißke, and opened on schedule on 9 October 1987.

== Description ==
The dome of the main hall has a diameter of 23 metres (75 ft) and is equipped with a Universarium IX planetarium projector from Carl Zeiss AG.

There is also a café and a movie theatre with 160 seats. The dome hall has not only a planetarium projector but also up to 100 slide projectors, a laser show installation, and sound equipment, including a recording studio to create new shows.

== Uses ==
The building is not only used for astronomy shows; the dome hall with 292 seats also allows for music concerts and audio drama, with a regularly scheduled "audio theatre under a starry sky" (German: Hörspielkino unterm Sternenhimmel) running since 1995.

It serves as one of many venues for the Berlin International Film Festival each February. It has two spaces available for film screenings: the planetarium hall with 307 seats, and a cinema hall with 160 seats. It was one of the last buildings built in the GDR, constructed in 1987.

== See also ==
- Zeiss projector series
- Planetarium Jena
