= Nicolaus Copernicus Gesamtausgabe =

Collection of works by, and related to, Nicolaus Copernicus

The Nicolaus-Copernicus-Gesamtausgabe (Nicolaus Copernicus Complete Edition) is a comprehensive, commented collection of works by, about, and related to Nicolaus Copernicus. The Gesamtausgabe includes Copernicus's surviving manuscripts and notes, his published writings, other authors' commentary about Copernicus and his works, a bibliography, and a biography.

Compilation of the series began in 1973 to commemorate the 500th anniversary of Copernicus's birth. The first volume is the astronomer's landmark work, De revolutionibus orbium coelestium (On the Revolutions of the Heavenly Spheres), which expounded Copernicus's heliocentric theory of the universe. The set is published by Akademie Verlag in Berlin, Germany.

== Volumes ==
- I: De revolutionibus orbium coelestium, 1974, ISBN 978-3-05-003897-1
- II:
- III/1: Kommentar zu "De revolutionibus", 1998, ISBN 978-3-05-003123-1
- III/3: De Revolutionibus. Die erste deutsche Übersetzung in der Grazer Handschrift, 2007, ISBN 978-3-05-004355-5
- IV:
- V: Opera Minora 1999, ISBN 978-3-05-003498-0
- VI/1: Documenta Copernicana, 1994, ISBN 978-3-05-002594-0
- VI/2: Documenta Copernicana, 1996, ISBN 978-3-05-003009-8
- VII:
- VIII/1: Receptio Copernicana, ISBN 978-3-05-003433-1
- IX: Biographia Copernicana
