= Mob Rules Tour =

1981–82 concert tour by Black Sabbath

- Tour by Black Sabbath
- US tour program
- Location: Europe; North America
- Associated album: Mob Rules
- Start date: 15 November 1981
- End date: 31 August 1982
- Legs: 4
- No. of shows: 102

Black Sabbath concert chronology
- Heaven & Hell Tour (1980–81); Mob Rules Tour (1981–82); Born Again Tour (1983–84)

The Mob Rules Tour was a concert tour by the English heavy metal band Black Sabbath, which began on 15 November 1981 in Quebec City and concluded on 31 August 1982 in Hoffman Estates, Illinois.

== Background ==
A cross was used in the stage production.

"The album is more rockier than we've done before," observed guitarist Tony Iommi, "and the show is far more uptempo that it has been before – and a lot more involved… with stage presentation and effects and stuff like that. We enjoy it, the whole thing – we're very happy with the situation at the moment."

Recordings from the tour spawned the Live Evil album.

== Tour dates ==
List of 1981 concerts
Date	City	Country	Venue
15 November 1981	Quebec City	Canada	Quebec Coliseum
16 November 1981	Kitchener	Canada	Kitchener Memorial Arena
17 November 1981	Sudbury	Canada	Sudbury Community Arena
19 November 1981	Toronto	Canada	Maple Leaf Gardens
20 November 1981	Montreal	Canada	Montreal Forum
21 November 1981	Ottawa	Canada	Ottawa Civic Arena
22 November 1981	Binghamton	United States	Broome County Veterans Memorial Arena
23 November 1981	Allentown	United States	Agricultural Hall
24 November 1981	Bethlehem	United States	Stabler Arena
25 November 1981	Glens Falls	United States	Glens Falls Civic Center
27 November 1981	Pittsburgh	United States	Civic Arena
28 November 1981	Toledo	United States	Toledo Sports Arena
29 November 1981	Columbus	United States	Columbus Fairgrounds Coliseum
30 November 1981	Charleston	United States	Charleston Civic Center
1 December 1981	Buffalo	United States	Buffalo Memorial Auditorium
3 December 1981	Landover	United States	Capital Centre
4 December 1981	Philadelphia	United States	Spectrum
5 December 1981	Salisbury	United States	Wicomico Civic Arena
6 December 1981	Richmond	United States	Richmond Coliseum
8 December 1981	Richfield	United States	Richfield Coliseum
9 December 1981	Louisville	United States	Louisville Gardens
10 December 1981	Memphis	United States	Mid-South Coliseum
12 December 1981	Little Rock	United States	Barton Coliseum
13 December 1981	Mobile	United States	Mobile Municipal Arena
14 December 1981	Mobile	United States	Mobile Municipal Arena
~~15 December 1981~~	~~Atlanta~~	United States	~~Omni Coliseum~~
16 December 1981	Nashville	United States	Nashville Municipal Auditorium
17 December 1981	Cincinnati	United States	Riverfront Coliseum
19 December 1981	Indianapolis	United States	Market Square Arena
20 December 1981	Chicago	United States	International Amphitheatre
21 December 1981	Chicago	United States	International Amphitheatre
31 December 1981	London	England	Hammersmith Odeon

List of 1982 concerts
Date	City	Country	Venue
1 January 1982	London	England	Hammersmith Odeon
2 January 1982	London	England	Hammersmith Odeon
3 January 1982	London	England	Hammersmith Odeon
5 January 1982	Newcastle	England	Newcastle City Hall
6 January 1982	Newcastle	England	Newcastle City Hall
7 January 1982	Newcastle	England	Newcastle City Hall
~~8 January 1982~~	~~Edinburgh~~	~~Scotland~~	~~Highland Hall~~
9 January 1982	Stafford	England	New Bingley Hall
10 January 1982	Leicester	England	Granby Halls
12 January 1982	Leeds	England	Queens Hall
~~13 January 1982~~	~~Cardiff~~	~~Wales~~	~~Sophia Gardens Pavilion~~
14 January 1982	St. Austell	England	Cornwall Coliseum
15 January 1982	Portsmouth	England	Portsmouth Guildhall
~~4 February 1982~~	~~New Haven~~	United States	~~New Haven Coliseum~~
~~6 February 1982~~	~~Syracuse~~	United States	~~Onondaga County War Memorial Arena~~
~~7 February 1982~~	~~Kingston~~	United States	~~Kingston Armory~~
~~10 February 1982~~	~~New York City~~	United States	~~Madison Square Garden~~
~~11 February 1982~~	~~Binghamton~~	United States	~~Broome County Veterans Memorial Arena~~
~~12 February 1982~~	~~Providence~~	United States	~~Providence Civic Arena~~
~~13 February 1982~~	~~Rochester~~	United States	~~Rochester Community War Memorial Arena~~
16 February 1982	Greensboro	United States	Greensboro Coliseum
17 February 1982	Roanoke	United States	Roanoke Civic Center
19 February 1982	Jacksonville	United States	Jacksonville Coliseum
20 February 1982	Pembroke Pines	United States	Hollywood Sportatorium
21 February 1982	Lakeland	United States	Lakeland Civic Center
24 February 1982	Tallahassee	United States	Leon County Civic Center
25 February 1982	Knoxville	United States	Knoxville Civic Coliseum
26 February 1982	Charlotte	United States	Charlotte Coliseum
27 February 1982	Atlanta	United States	Omni Coliseum
2 March 1982	New Haven	United States	New Haven Coliseum
3 March 1982	Baltimore	United States	Baltimore Civic Center
4 March 1982	Boston	United States	Boston Garden
6 March 1982	Detroit	United States	Cobo Center
7 March 1982	Trotwood	United States	Hara Arena
8 March 1982	Saginaw	United States	Wendler Arena
9 March 1982	Louisville	United States	Louisville Gardens
10 March 1982	Ashwaubenon	United States	Brown County Veterans Memorial Arena
11 March 1982	Madison	United States	Dane County Veterans Memorial Coliseum
12 March 1982	Madison	United States	Dane County Veterans Memorial Coliseum
13 March 1982	Bloomington	United States	Metropolitan Sports Center
15 March 1982	Cedar Rapids	United States	Five Seasons Center
16 March 1982	Springfield	United States	Prairie Capital Convention Center
17 March 1982	St. Louis	United States	Checkerdome
19 March 1982	Omaha	United States	Omaha Civic Arena
20 March 1982	Kansas City	United States	Kansas City Municipal Arena
21 March 1982	Wichita	United States	Levitt Arena
April 1982	Las Vegas	United States	Rotunda
9 April 1982	San Diego	United States	San Diego Sports Arena
10 April 1982	Long Beach	United States	Long Beach Arena
12 April 1982	Phoenix	United States	Arizona Veterans Memorial Coliseum
13 April 1982	San Bernardino	United States	Orange Pavilion
14 April 1982	Reno	United States	Reno-Sparks Convention Center
15 April 1982	Inglewood	United States	The Forum
17 April 1982	Daly City	United States	Cow Palace
18 April 1982	Fresno	United States	Selland Arena
20 April 1982	Davis	United States	Davis Recreation Hall
21 April 1982	Central Point	United States	Jackson County Expo
22 April 1982	Portland	United States	Veterans Memorial Coliseum
23 April 1982	Seattle	United States	Seattle Center Arena (Live Evil)
24 April 1982	Seattle	United States	Seattle Center Arena (Live Evil)
26 April 1982	Vancouver	Canada	Pacific Coliseum
27 April 1982	Lethbridge	Canada	Canadian Games Sportsplex Arena
28 April 1982	Calgary	Canada	Stampede Corral
29 April 1982	Calgary	Canada	Stampede Corral
30 April 1982	Edmonton	Canada	Northlands Coliseum
1 May 1982	Regina	Canada	Agridome
~~2 May 1982~~	~~Winnipeg~~	Canada	~~Winnipeg Arena~~
4 May 1982	Billings	United States	Yellowstone METRA
5 May 1982	Casper	United States	Casper Events Center
6 May 1982	Salt Lake City	United States	Salt Palace
8 May 1982	Denver	United States	McNichols Sports Arena
9 May 1982	Albuquerque	United States	Tingley Coliseum
11 May 1982	Houston	United States	Sam Houston Coliseum
12 May 1982	Dallas	United States	Dallas Convention Center (Live Evil)
13 May 1982	San Antonio	United States	San Antonio Convention Center (Live Evil)
17 May 1982	New York City	United States	Madison Square Garden
18 May 1982	Providence	United States	Providence Civic Center
19 May 1982	Kingston	United States	Kingston Armory
21 May 1982	Rochester	United States	Rochester Community War Memorial
22 May 1982	Syracuse	United States	Onondaga County War Memorial
23 May 1982	Binghamton	United States	Broome County Veterans Memorial Arena
28 May 1982	Chicago	United States	UIC Pavilion
29 May 1982	Chicago	United States	UIC Pavilion
1 June 1982	Milwaukee	United States	MECCA Arena
21 August 1982	Columbia	United States	Merriweather Post Pavilion
22 August 1982	East Rutherford	United States	Meadowlands Arena
24 August 1982	Toronto	Canada	CNE Stadium
~~25 August 1982~~	Ottawa	Canada	Lansdowne Park
27 August 1982	Ottawa	Canada	Lansdowne Park
28 August 1982	Clarkston	United States	Pine Knob Music Theatre
29 August 1982	East Troy	United States	Alpine Valley Music Theatre
31 August 1982	Hoffman Estates	United States	Poplar Creek Music Theater

== Personnel ==
- Ronnie James Dio – vocals
- Tony Iommi – guitar
- Geezer Butler – bass
- Vinny Appice – drums, percussion
