= Heaven & Hell Tour =

1980–81 concert tour by Black Sabbath

- Tour by Black Sabbath
- Poster to the concert in Columbus, Ohio
- Location: Asia; Australia; Europe; North America
- Associated album: Heaven and Hell
- Start date: 17 April 1980
- End date: 2 February 1981
- Legs: 5
- No. of shows: 128

Black Sabbath concert chronology
- Never Say Die! Tour (1978); Heaven & Hell Tour (1980–81); Mob Rules Tour (1981–82)

The Heaven & Hell Tour was the ninth world concert tour by the English heavy metal band Black Sabbath between April 1980 and February 1981 to promote their 1980 studio album, Heaven and Hell. The tour marked the band's first live shows with vocalist Ronnie James Dio, who had replaced original vocalist Ozzy Osbourne the previous year; drummer Vinny Appice, who replaced original drummer Bill Ward in the middle of the tour's North American leg after Ward suddenly left the band due to personal issues; and keyboardist Geoff Nicholls, who played keyboards on the Heaven and Hell album and accompanied the band on this tour as a sideman. For a portion of the North American tour, which was popularly known as the "Black and Blue Tour", Black Sabbath co-headlined with Blue Öyster Cult, with whom they shared a manager, Sandy Pearlman. The arrangement reportedly set attendance records but caused friction between the two bands as well as between Black Sabbath and Pearlman.

== Overview ==
=== Background ===
In April 1980, Black Sabbath released Heaven and Hell, the band's ninth studio album and first with former Rainbow and Elf lead singer, Ronnie James Dio, who was hired to replace original lead singer, Ozzy Osbourne. The band began the Heaven and Hell Tour in Europe to promote their new album, which was released shortly after the tour started. The response from fans and critics was generally positive. According to Black Sabbath lead-guitarist, Tony Iommi, some audience members were initially displeased that Osbourne was no longer in the band, but "eventually Ronnie won them over." The band's stage setup for the tour included an electronic cross that flashed lights and burst into flames, which Iommi said "hardly ever worked."

=== Europe (first leg) ===
The band first toured Europe, where according to David Konow, "they knew the audience would still be there for them" despite the change in lead singers. The initial shows were intended to "break the band in while out of the spotlight" (according to Garry Sharpe-Young) before taking on larger shows in Vienna, Landshut and the United Kingdom. Almost all the dates on this first leg of the tour were either in West Germany or the United Kingdom, where the band had a four-night sell-out run at the Hammersmith Odeon in London, supported by Girlschool. Support bands for other dates included Angel Witch and Shakin' Street, who later supported some U.S. tour dates. The American heavy metal band Manowar traces its origins to this time, when Ross the Boss, who was then the guitarist in Shakin' Street, met Sabbath's bass tech Joey DeMaio at a United Kingdom show. The two became friends during the tour, and later founded Manowar.

=== North America (Black and Blue Tour) ===
During the North American leg of the tour, Black Sabbath co-headlined most of their shows with Blue Öyster Cult at the suggestion of Sandy Pearlman, who at that time was managing both bands. This became known as the Black & Blue Tour. The two co-headliners were supported by opening acts including Sammy Hagar, Saxon, Riot, Molly Hatchet and Shakin' Street. The shows were a financial success, drawing high attendance and frequently placing in Billboard's weekly "Top Boxoffice" surveys. However, Sabbath was unhappy with the arrangement since Pearlman had a close relationship with Blue Öyster Cult after having founded the band and being involved with their career for over a decade as both a manager and record producer, while he had started managing Sabbath in 1979. Sabbath felt that Pearlman was favoring Blue Öyster Cult and that Blue Öyster Cult was also appropriating elements of Sabbath's musical style and performance. Friction erupted between the two bands over which band would close the show as well as the logistics of dealing with each band's stage set (which for Blue Öyster Cult included a huge Godzilla structure that took time to remove from the stage). Pearlman has said that Sabbath resented having to share the tour proceeds with Blue Öyster Cult. Iommi has indicated that this situation contributed to the band's decision to fire Pearlman shortly thereafter.

==== Bill Ward's departure ====
Ward was increasingly suffering from substance abuse issues. "Alcohol had become more important than Black Sabbath, our audience, my family, everything, and that included me," he reflected later. "Also, I was absolutely missing [Osbourne]; really missing him and I wasn't coping with my grief that well because I was so drunk. My mother had died and I wasn't coping with the grief for my mother and I was feeling overwhelmed with loss. Lastly, as much as I loved Ronnie James Dio, it [the new band lineup] didn't work for me."

Ward performed his last show with Sabbath at Met Center on 19 August 1980 – and, like Osbourne, would not perform with Sabbath again until 13 July 1985 at JFK Stadium in Philadelphia for Live Aid. The following night, Sabbath were forced to cancel their sold-out show at McNichols Sports Arena in Denver when Ward either arrived late or failed to go on. Blue Öyster Cult did perform and received the sizeable proceeds of the show, while Sabbath were not paid for this show or for subsequent shows that they cancelled due to Ward's unavailability.

"I escalated into such oblivion that I just was incapable of confronting my losses and dealing with them in a healthy way..." Ward explained. "I blamed everybody and everything for my problems and I just fell apart... That's why I left the Heaven & Hell tour."

Turned down by Cozy Powell, Sabbath replaced Ward with Vinny Appice. Appice played his first show with Sabbath on 31 August 1980 at Aloha Stadium in Honolulu for The Summer Blowout.

"We didn't want Bill to leave…" said Iommi during the Mob Rules Tour. "He had a lot going on within himself that we didn't know about, and Bill needed time to actually sit back and think." Of Appice, the guitarist said: "He had two days to learn the show before we done an open-air show in Hawaii, and he's done really well – very, very quick."

==== Milwaukee riot ====
On 9 October 1980, Black Sabbath and Blue Öyster Cult co-headlined a show at the MECCA Arena in Milwaukee, where Sabbath was scheduled to play last. As Butler was about to play his bass solo intro to "N.I.B.", someone in the audience threw a projectile (either a bottle or a large metal cross, depending on the source) and hit Butler in the head, knocking him out cold. The show was stopped and Butler was taken to the hospital, where he received stitches and was later released. Dio came back onstage, told the audience what had happened, and told off whoever threw the projectile. Sabbath's road manager then announced that the show was cancelled and berated the audience, which angered them. When the audience of approximately 7,000 to 9,000 saw the crew beginning to remove the band's equipment from the stage, they began destroying windows, doors and furniture inside the venue, doing $10,000 worth of damage. After the venue was cleared by police, fighting continued outside the venue and up to two blocks away, and it took police over an hour to clear the area. According to an October 1980 article in Billboard magazine, "Every available officer in the city was called out" and "two policemen and dozens of concertgoers were injured." Butler has recalled injured fans being brought into the hospital alongside him while he was being treated. A 2014 retrospective article in the Milwaukee Record said that three police officers were injured and roughly 100 arrests were made. Following the riot, MECCA's management enacted restrictions designed to prevent attendees from bringing alcohol into the venue, and placed an indefinite ban on "hard rock concerts" there, with MECCA's president stating that the venue would now only consider booking "middle-of-the-road performers" such as Billy Joel and Barry Manilow. Blue Öyster Cult bassist Joe Bouchard said that the band was "banned from Milwaukee for years" after the incident, despite having nothing to do with the riot.

==== Black and Blue concert video ====
On 17 October 1980, Black Sabbath and Blue Öyster Cult performed at Nassau Coliseum in Hempstead, New York. The performances from that show were filmed and, after the tour, released as the concert film Black and Blue. The film was shown on the midnight movie circuit in the United States. In the 1980s, the film was also released on VHS and laserdisc for the home video market. The film has never been officially released on DVD and DVDs on the market are generally bootlegs. Official DVD releases were announced and cancelled two separate times in 2002 by Castle Pictures and in 2004 by Universal Video, although some shops in Europe did sell a few copies of the 2004 DVD. Members of Blue Öyster Cult, as well as Castle Pictures, have indicated that a DVD was not released because Tony Iommi objected to the film's distribution.

=== Asia and Australia legs ===
After finishing the North American leg of the tour, Black Sabbath toured Asia and Australia. On 18 November 1980, at Nakano Sun Plaza in Tokyo, Tony Iommi became ill from food poisoning and was then taken to the hospital, thus cancelling the rest of the show after playing for 70 minutes along with the following night's show. Near the end of the band's time in Japan, Butler broke one of his fingers. According to Butler, the doctor he saw in Japan did not think the finger was broken, so he continued to play several more shows until severe pain forced him to seek additional treatment in Australia, at which time the fracture was diagnosed and the remaining Australian tour dates were cancelled. Rose Tattoo supported Sabbath on the few Australian dates that were played.

=== Europe (second leg) ===
The final leg of the tour, which took place in the United Kingdom, had originally been scheduled to take place in late December 1980 through early January 1981, but was postponed to late January to early February 1981 due to Butler's finger injury. Black Sabbath was supported by A II Z and Max Webster for some shows. The final show of the tour took place on 2 February 1981 at Cornwall Coliseum in St Austell.

== Personnel ==
Heaven and Hell line-up

- Ronnie James Dio – Vocals
- Tony Iommi – Guitar
- Geezer Butler – Bass
- Bill Ward – Drums
- Geoff Nicholls – Keyboards

Mob Rules line-up

- Ronnie James Dio – Vocals
- Tony Iommi – Guitar
- Geezer Butler – Bass
- Vinny Appice – Drums
- Geoff Nicholls – Keyboards

== Tour dates ==
List of 1980 concerts
| Date | City | Country | Venue |
|---|---|---|---|
| 17 April 1980 | Aurich | West Germany | Stadthalle (Ronnie James Dio's first show) |
| 18 April 1980 | Oldenburg | West Germany | Weser-Ems Halle |
| 19 April 1980 | Verl | West Germany | Ostwestfalenhalle |
| 21 April 1980 | Fallingbostel | West Germany | Heidmarkhalle |
| 22 April 1980 | Rendsburg | West Germany | Nordmarkhalle |
| 24 April 1980 | Vienna | Austria | Sofiensaal |
| 25 April 1980 | Passau | West Germany | Nibelungenhalle |
| 26 April 1980 | Landshut | West Germany | ETSV Sport Hall |
| 30 April 1980 | Portsmouth | England | Portsmouth Guildhall |
| 1 May 1980 | Portsmouth | England | Portsmouth Guildhall |
| 2 May 1980 | Bristol | England | Colston Hall |
| 3 May 1980 | Poole | England | Wessex Hall |
| 7 May 1980 | London | England | Hammersmith Odeon |
| 8 May 1980 | London | England | Hammersmith Odeon |
| 9 May 1980 | London | England | Hammersmith Odeon |
| 10 May 1980 | London | England | Hammersmith Odeon |
| 14 May 1980 | Glasgow | Scotland | The Apollo |
| 15 May 1980 | Glasgow | Scotland | The Apollo |
| 16 May 1980 | Edinburgh | Scotland | Edinburgh Odeon |
| 18 May 1980 | Newcastle | England | Newcastle City Hall |
| 19 May 1980 | Newcastle | England | Newcastle City Hall |
| 20 May 1980 | Queensferry | Wales | Deeside Leisure Centre |
| 22 May 1980 | Manchester | England | Manchester Apollo |
| 23 May 1980 | Manchester | England | Manchester Apollo |
| 24 May 1980 | Birmingham | England | Birmingham Odeon |
| 25 May 1980 | Birmingham | England | Birmingham Odeon |
| 26 May 1980 | Leicester | England | De Montfort Hall |
| 2 June 1980 | Offenbach | West Germany | Stadthalle Offenbach |
| 3 June 1980 | Munich | West Germany | Circus Krone Building |
| 5 June 1980 | Eppelheim | West Germany | Rhein-Neckar-Halle |
| 6 June 1980 | Neunkirchen | West Germany | Hemmerleinhalle |
| 7 June 1980 | Uhingen | West Germany | Haldenberg Hall |
| ~~8 June 1980~~ | Würzburg | West Germany | Tauberfrankenhalle |
| ~~11 June 1980~~ | Siegen | West Germany | Siegerland Hall |
| ~~12 June 1980~~ | Düsseldorf | West Germany | Philips Hall |
| ~~14 June 1980~~ | Bremen | West Germany | Stadthalle |
| ~~15 June 1980~~ | Hamburg | West Germany | Messehalle 8 |
| ~~21 June 1980~~ | Zürich | Switzerland | Volkshaus |
| 24 June 1980 | St. Austell | England | Cornwall Coliseum |
| 25 June 1980 | Southampton | England | Gaumont Theatre |
| 26 June 1980 | Brighton | England | Brighton Centre |
| 2 July 1980 | El Paso | United States | El Paso County Coliseum |
| 3 July 1980 | Lubbock | United States | Lubbock Municipal Coliseum |
| 5 July 1980 | Dallas | United States | Dallas Convention Center |
| 7 July 1980 | Corpus Christi | United States | Corpus Christi Memorial Coliseum |
| 9 July 1980 | Norman | United States | Lloyd Noble Center |
| 10 July 1980 | Tulsa | United States | Tulsa Assembly Center |
| 13 July 1980 | Houston | United States | Robertson Stadium (Houston Rocks) |
| 14 July 1980 | San Antonio | United States | San Antonio Convention Center (San Antonio Summer Jam) |
| 16 July 1980 | Billings | United States | MetraPark Arena |
| ~~18 July 1980~~ | Spokane | United States | Spokane Coliseum |
| 19 July 1980 | Seattle | United States | Memorial Stadium (Seattle Summer Rock Jam) |
| 20 July 1980 | Salem | United States | Oregon State Fairgrounds (Oregon Jam) |
| 23 July 1980 | Ventura | United States | Ventura County Fairgrounds |
| 25 July 1980 | Phoenix | United States | Phoenix Municipal Stadium (Arizona Jam) |
| 26 July 1980 | Los Angeles | United States | Los Angeles Memorial Coliseum (Los Angeles Summer Blowout) |
| 27 July 1980 | Oakland | United States | Oakland Coliseum (Day on the Green (#2)) |
| 8 August 1980 | West Lebanon | United States | Lebanon Valley Speedway |
| 9 August 1980 | Philadelphia | United States | Spectrum |
| 10 August 1980 | Hartford | United States | Hartford Civic Center |
| 12 August 1980 | Providence | United States | Providence Civic Center |
| 13 August 1980 | Scarborough | United States | Scarborough Downs Speedway |
| 14 August 1980 | Trotwood | United States | Hara Arena |
| 15 August 1980 | Evansville | United States | Mesker Amphitheatre |
| 16 August 1980 | Kalamazoo | United States | Wings Stadium |
| 17 August 1980 | Rockford | United States | Rockford Speedway (Rockford Speedway Jam) |
| 19 August 1980 | Bloomington | United States | Met Center (Bill's last show until Live Aid (7/13/1985)) |
| ~~21 August 1980~~ | Denver | United States | McNichols Sports Arena |
| ~~22 August 1980~~ | West Valley City | United States | Bonneville Raceway |
| ~~23 August 1980~~ | Las Vegas | United States | Las Vegas Convention Center |
| ~~24 August 1980~~ | San Diego | United States | San Diego Sports Arena |
| ~~25 August 1980~~ | Fresno | United States | Selland Arena |
| ~~26 August 1980~~ | Albuquerque | United States | Tingley Coliseum |
| 31 August 1980 | Honolulu | United States | Aloha Stadium (Honolulu Summer Blowout) (Vinny Appice's first show) |
| 5 September 1980 | Lakeland | United States | Lakeland Civic Center |
| 6 September 1980 | Jacksonville | United States | Jacksonville Coliseum |
| 7 September 1980 | Miami | United States | Miami Jai-Alai Fronton |
| 10 September 1980 | Memphis | United States | Mid-South Coliseum |
| 12 September 1980 | Atlanta | United States | The Omni |
| 13 September 1980 | Greenville | United States | Greenville Memorial Auditorium |
| 14 September 1980 | Fayetteville | United States | Cumberland County Memorial Arena |
| 19 September 1980 | New Haven | United States | New Haven Coliseum |
| 20 September 1980 | Boston | United States | Boston Garden |
| 21 September 1980 | Springfield | United States | Springfield Civic Center |
| 23 September 1980 | Lexington | United States | Rupp Arena |
| ~~25 September 1980~~ | Birmingham | United States | Boutwell Auditorium |
| 26 September 1980 | Charlotte | United States | Charlotte Coliseum |
| 27 September 1980 | Charleston | United States | Charleston Civic Center |
| 29 September 1980 | Kansas City | United States | Kansas City Municipal Auditorium |
| 30 September 1980 | St. Louis | United States | Checkerdome |
| 1 October 1980 | Chicago | United States | International Amphitheatre |
| 3 October 1980 | Pittsburgh | United States | Civic Arena |
| 4 October 1980 | Toledo | United States | Toledo Sports Arena |
| 5 October 1980 | Detroit | United States | Joe Louis Arena |
| 7 October 1980 | Columbus | United States | St. John Arena |
| 8 October 1980 | Indianapolis | United States | Market Square Arena |
| 9 October 1980 | Milwaukee | United States | MECCA Arena (Cancelled after Geezer's head injury that led to a riot) |
| 10 October 1980 | Louisville | United States | Freedom Hall |
| 12 October 1980 | Richfield | United States | Richfield Coliseum |
| 13 October 1980 | Buffalo | United States | Buffalo Memorial Auditorium |
| 14 October 1980 | Landover | United States | Capital Centre |
| 16 October 1980 | Rochester | United States | Rochester Community War Memorial |
| 17 October 1980 | Uniondale | United States | Nassau Coliseum |
| 18 October 1980 | New York City | United States | Madison Square Garden |
| 19 October 1980 | Erie | United States | Erie County Field House |
| 21 October 1980 | Norfork | United States | Scope Arena |
| 22 October 1980 | Wheeling | United States | Wheeling Civic Center |
| 23 October 1980 | Fort Wayne | United States | Allen County War Memorial Coliseum |
| 25 October 1980 | Cincinnati | United States | Riverfront Coliseum |
| 1 November 1980 | Boise | United States | Idaho State Fair Grandstand |
| 3 November 1980 | Salt Lake City | United States | Salt Palace |
| 4 November 1980 | Colorado Springs | United States | Colorado Springs City Auditorium |
| 6 November 1980 | St. Joseph | United States | St. Joseph Civic Arena |
| 7 November 1980 | Wichta | United States | Henry Levitt Arena |
| 8 November 1980 | Omaha | United States | Omaha Civic Auditorium |
| 16 November 1980 | Tokyo | Japan | Nakano Sun Plaza (2 Shows) |
| 17 November 1980 | Tokyo | Japan | Nippon Seinenkan |
| 18 November 1980 | Tokyo | Japan | Nakano Sun Plaza Hall (Cancelled 70 minutes into set due to Tony's illness (11/18)) |
| ~~19 November 1980~~ | Tokyo | Japan | Nakano Sun Plaza Hall (Cancelled 70 minutes into set due to Tony's illness (11/18)) |
| 20 November 1980 | Kyoto | Japan | Kyoto Kaikan |
| 21 November 1980 | Osaka | Japan | Festival Hall |
| 24 November 1980 | Sydney | Australia | Capitol Theatre |
| 25 November 1980 | Sydney | Australia | Capitol Theatre |
| 26 November 1980 | Sydney | Australia | Capitol Theatre |
| 27 November 1980 | Newcastle | Australia | Newcastle Civic Theatre |
| 29 November 1980 | Brisbane | Australia | Brisbane Festival Hall |
| ~~1 December 1980~~ | Melbourne | Australia | ~~?~~ (Cancelled due to Geezer's injury) |
| ~~5 December 1980~~ | Adelaide | Australia | ~~?~~ (Cancelled due to Geezer's injury) |
| ~~6 December 1980~~ | Perth | Australia | ~~?~~ (Cancelled due to Geezer's injury) |

List of 1981 concerts
| Date | City | Country | Venue |
|---|---|---|---|
| 18 January 1981 | London | England | Hammersmith Odeon |
| 19 January 1981 | London | England | Hammersmith Odeon |
| 20 January 1981 | London | England | Hammersmith Odeon |
| 21 January 1981 | London | England | Hammersmith Odeon |
| 23 January 1981 | Bridlington | England | Bridlington Royal Hall |
| 24 January 1981 | Leeds | England | Queens Hall |
| 25 January 1981 | Stafford | England | New Bingley Hall |
| 27 January 1981 | Bristol | England | Colston Hall |
| 28 January 1981 | Cardiff | Wales | Sophia Gardens Pavilion |
| 30 January 1981 | Southampton | England | Southampton Gaumont Theatre |
| 31 January 1981 | Crawley | England | Starlight Ballroom |
| 1 February 1981 | Poole | England | Poole Arts Centre |
| 2 February 1981 | St Austell | England | Cornwall Coliseum |
