= Mob Rules (album) =

1981 album by Black Sabbath

Studio album by Black Sabbath
- Released: 4 November 1981
- Recorded: 1981
- Studio: Record Plant (Los Angeles)
- Genre: Heavy metal
- Length: 40:36
- Label: Vertigo
- Producer: Martin Birch

Black Sabbath chronology
Live at Last (1980)	Mob Rules (1981)	Live Evil (1983)

Singles from Mob Rules
- 1. "Mob Rules" Released: 23 October 1981; 2. "Turn Up the Night" Released: 5 February 1982; 3. "Voodoo" Released: 1982

Mob Rules is the tenth studio album by the English heavy metal band Black Sabbath, released on 4 November 1981. It followed 1980's Heaven and Hell, and was the second album with lead singer Ronnie James Dio and the first with drummer Vinny Appice. Neither musician would appear on a Black Sabbath studio album again until the 1992 album Dehumanizer.

Produced and engineered by Martin Birch, the album received a remastered Deluxe Edition release in 2010 and an expanded edition in 2021.

== Recording ==
The first new recording Black Sabbath made after the Heaven and Hell album was a version of the title track "The Mob Rules" for the soundtrack of the film Heavy Metal. The track "E5150" is also heard in the film but not included on the soundtrack. According to guitarist Tony Iommi's autobiography Iron Man: My Journey Through Heaven & Hell with Black Sabbath, the band began writing and rehearsing songs for Mob Rules at a rented house in Toluca Lake in Los Angeles. Initially the band hoped to record in their own studio to save money and actually purchased a sound desk but, according to Iommi, "We just couldn't get a guitar sound. We tried it in the studio. We tried it in the hallway. We tried it everywhere but it just wasn't working. We'd bought a studio and it wasn't working!" The band eventually recorded the album at the Record Plant in Los Angeles.

Mob Rules was the first Sabbath album with Vinny Appice on drums, who had replaced original member Bill Ward in the middle of the Heaven and Hell tour. Asked by Joe Matera in 2007 if working with a new drummer was jarring after so many years, bassist and lyricist Geezer Butler replied, "No, because Vinny was a big fan of the band and loved Bill's playing. Bill was one of his favourite drummers and so he knew all his parts and my bass parts and he adjusted accordingly to everybody in the band. He was brilliant. He came in and totally filled in Bill's shoes."

In an interview for the concert film Neon Nights: 30 Years of Heaven and Hell, Butler cites "The Sign of the Southern Cross" as his favourite Mob Rules track because "it gave me a chance to experiment with some bass effects". The album was the last time the band worked with producer and engineer Martin Birch, who went on to work with Iron Maiden until his retirement in 1992. Iommi explained to Guitar World in 1992, "We were all going through a lot of problems at that time, most of it related to drugs. Even the producer, Martin Birch, was having drug problems, and it hurt the sound of that record. Once that happens to your producer, you’re really screwed."

Mob Rules was singer Ronnie James Dio's second and final studio recording with Black Sabbath until the Mob Rules-era line-up reunited for 1992's Dehumanizer. The seeds of discontent appear to have sown when Dio was offered a solo deal by Warner Brothers, with Iommi stating in his memoir, "After the (Heaven and Hell) record became such a great success, Warner Brothers extended the contract at the same time, offering Ronnie a solo deal. That felt a bit odd to us, because we were a band and we didn't want to separate anybody." Dio confided in an interview on the Neon Nights: 30 Years of Heaven and Hell DVD that the recording of Mob Rules was far more difficult for him than Heaven and Hell because "we approached the writing very much differently than the first one. Geezer had gone so we wrote in a very controlled environment in a living room with little amplifiers. And with Mob Rules we hired a studio, turned up as loud as possible and smashed through it all. So it made for a different kind of an attitude".

Vinny Appice stated in a 2021 interview with Pariah Burke that the writing for the album was largely a collaborative process done through jam sessions. He stated, "We put [songs] together by jamming and playing together and putting ideas in the pot. It's a natural way of doing it and it works really well for us. That's how we did all the big albums like Mob Rules and Holy Diver. Nobody came in with a song."

Iommi reflected to Guitar World in 1992, "Mob Rules was a confusing album for us. We started writing songs differently for some reason, and ended up not using a lot of really great material. That line-up was really great, and the whole thing fell apart for very silly reasons — we were all acting like children." The major problem, noted by Mick Wall in his book Black Sabbath: Symptom of the Universe, was that the balance of power within the band had shifted: "With Bill and Ozzy happy to leave the heavy lifting to Tony and Geezer, in terms of songwriting, coming into the studio only when they were called, even as their flair deserted them over the final, dismal Ozzy-era albums, at least everybody knew where they stood. Now, though, the creative chemistry had shifted." Iommi said in 1997, "I still like that album".

== Artwork ==
The cover of Mob Rules is adapted from a 1974 painting titled "Dream 1: Crucifiers" from a series of paintings by Greg Hildebrandt of the Brothers Hildebrandt partnership. The paintings were created after a projected documentary on world hunger by the brothers under the guidance of the Catholic Church fell through. Greg's relationship with the church soured, which resulted in the series of dream paintings. These paintings, including "Dream 1…" were published in 1978 by Ballantine Books in the book The Art of the Brothers Hildebrandt.

There were alterations, besides the inclusion of the band's name and album title, in the artwork. A hook seen dangling from the left side of the torture implement was changed to a cross. The blood stain in the center of the piece was also altered to more closely resemble a devil's head.

== Release and reception ==
Professional ratings
Review scores
Source	Rating
AllMusic	4/5 stars
Classic Rock	4/5 stars
Martin Popoff	10/10
Rolling Stone	1/5 stars
The Rolling Stone Album Guide	3/5 stars

Mob Rules was released on 4 November 1981 to mixed reviews. In the US it went gold and in the UK it reached the Top 20 and spawned two chart singles, the title track and "Turn Up the Night". AllMusic's Greg Prato called the album "underrated" and enthused, "Mob Rules was given a much punchier in-your-face mix by Birch, who seemed re-energized after his work on new wave of British heavy metal upstarts Iron Maiden's Killers album. Essentially Mob Rules is a magnificent record, with the only serious problem being the sequencing of the material which mirrors Heaven and Hell's almost to a tee."

Guitarist Tony Iommi acknowledged this common criticism in his memoir, admitting that he was frustrated at being accused of making Heaven and Hell part two and speculating that the band would have been criticized regardless of their approach.

Seven of the album's tracks were played live on the Mob Rules Tour. "E5150" was used as an intro tape, and "Over and Over" was the only song not featured on the tour in any way. While the title track was the only song from this album regularly played by Black Sabbath on subsequent tours, "Falling Off the Edge of the World" was performed live by Heaven & Hell (which consisted of the same Black Sabbath lineup that recorded Mob Rules), and "Sign of the Southern Cross" occasionally played live by Dio.

J.D. Considine of Rolling Stone gave Mob Rules a negative review in February 1986. Profiling the album in 2008, Bryan Reesman noted: "Even with Dio bringing in more fantasy-based lyrics and moving the group away from seemingly Satanic verses, the title track to Mob Rules, not to mention its menacing cover could easily imply a call to anarchy. But beyond the snarling guitars and vocals is actually a cautionary tale against mindless mayhem."

In modern re-evaluations, the album is generally looked upon very favorably, with Rolling Stone awarding the album a positive review of 3 stars, and other reviewers such as Allmusic's Fred Thomas observing that "Mob Rules and Heaven and Hell work well as each other's companion pieces, making the first round of Dio-fronted Sabbath material a bright spot surrounded by relatively grim efforts on either side." and Classic Rock complimenting the lyricism alongside Tony Iommi's riffs.

In a retrospective critique and ranking of the band’s releases throughout their career, The Guardian opines that “(a)fter the success of "Heaven and Hell" (1980), Sabbath essentially made the same album again, just not quite as well. But what could have been a productive 80s was derailed by rows about the mix (Iommi accused Dio of sneaking back to the studio at night to turn his vocals up) and by Dio’s departure.”

== Track listing ==
=== Standard Edition ===
All lyrics are written by Ronnie James Dio, except where noted; all music is composed by Geezer Butler, Ronnie James Dio, Tony Iommi.

Side A
No.	Title	Length
1.	"Turn Up the Night"	3:42
2.	"Voodoo"	4:32
3.	"The Sign of the Southern Cross"	7:46
4.	"E5150" (instrumental)	2:54
5.	"The Mob Rules"	3:14

Side B
No.	Title	Length
6.	"Country Girl"	4:02
7.	"Slipping Away"	3:45
8.	"Falling Off the Edge of the World"	5:02
9.	"Over and Over"	5:28
Total length:		40:36

=== 2010 Deluxe Edition ===
Disc one
No.	Title	Length
1.	"Turn Up the Night"	3:42
2.	"Voodoo"	4:32
3.	"The Sign of the Southern Cross"	7:44
4.	"E5150"	2:54
5.	"The Mob Rules"	3:15
6.	"Country Girl"	4:02
7.	"Slipping Away"	3:42
8.	"Falling Off the Edge of the World"	5:03
9.	"Over and Over"	5:28
10.	"Die Young" (live, 12" single B-Side of Mob Rules)	4:04
11.	"The Mob Rules" (Heavy Metal OMPS/ Original demo version)	3:14
Total length:		47:51

Disc two - Live at Hammersmith Odeon
No.	Title	Recording date	Length
1.	"E5150"	2 January 1982	1:18
2.	"Neon Knights" (Dio, Iommi, Butler, Bill Ward)	2 January 1982	4:37
3.	"N.I.B." (Ozzy Osbourne, Iommi, Butler, Ward)	1 January 1982	5:16
4.	"Children of the Sea" (Dio, Iommi, Butler, Ward)	1 January 1982	6:07
5.	"Country Girl"	1 January 1982	3:53
6.	"Black Sabbath" (Osbourne, Iommi, Butler, Ward)	31 December 1981	8:24
7.	"War Pigs" (Osbourne, Iommi, Butler, Ward)	1 January 1982	7:40
8.	"Slipping Away"	31 December 1981	3:18
9.	"Iron Man" (Osbourne, Iommi, Butler, Ward)	1 January 1982	7:04
10.	"The Mob Rules"	31 December 1981	3:35
11.	"Heaven and Hell" (Dio, Iommi, Butler, Ward)	1 January 1982	14:24
12.	"Paranoid" (Osbourne, Iommi, Butler, Ward)	31 December 1981	3:21
13.	"Voodoo"	2 January 1982	5:45
14.	"Children of the Grave" (Osbourne, Iommi, Butler, Ward)	31 December 1981	5:05

=== 2021 40th Anniversary Edition ===
Disc one tracks 12, 17 & 18 and all disc two tracks previously unreleased.

Disc one: Original Album (2021 Remaster)
No.	Title	Length
1.	"Turn Up the Night"	3:42
2.	"Voodoo"	4:32
3.	"The Sign of the Southern Cross"	7:44
4.	"E5150"	2:54
5.	"The Mob Rules"	3:15
6.	"Country Girl"	4:02
7.	"Slipping Away"	3:42
8.	"Falling Off the Edge of the World"	5:03
9.	"Over and Over"	5:28
Total length:		40:33

Bonus Tracks
No.	Title	Length
10.	"The Mob Rules" (Heavy Metal Soundtrack Version)	3:14
11.	"Die Young" (Live B-Side of The Mob Rules)	4:03
12.	"The Mob Rules" (New 2021 Mix)	3:24

Live at Hammersmith Odeon, London, 31 December 1981 – 2 January 1982
No.	Title	Length
13.	"Country Girl"	3:59
14.	"Slipping Away"	3:15
15.	"The Mob Rules"	3:21
16.	"Voodoo"	5:46

Live at Portland Memorial Coliseum, U.S.A., 22 April 1982
No.	Title	Length
17.	"Intro: E5150"	0:59
18.	"Neon Knights"	4:27

Disc two: Live at Portland Memorial Coliseum, U.S.A., 22 April 1982 (continued)
No.	Title	Length
1.	"N.I.B."	6:02
2.	"Children of the Sea"	7:13
3.	"Voodoo"	5:52
4.	"Black Sabbath"	7:30
5.	"War Pigs"	7:19
6.	"Drum Solo"	3:06
7.	"Iron Man"	8:09
8.	"The Mob Rules"	3:36
9.	"Heaven and Hell"	9:44
10.	"Guitar Solo"	3:10
11.	"The Sign of the Southern Cross / Heaven and Hell (Reprise)"	7:29
12.	"Paranoid"	3:30
13.	"Children of the Grave"	5:29

== Personnel ==
Personnel adapted from Mob Rules liner notes

Black Sabbath

- Ronnie James Dio – vocals
- Tony Iommi – guitars
- Geezer Butler – bass
- Vinny Appice – drums

Additional performer

- Geoff Nicholls – keyboards

Production

- Produced and engineered by Martin Birch
- Assistant engineers – Eddie DeLena, Angelo Arcuri
- Technicians to Black Sabbath – Ian Ferguson, Michael Howse, Les Martin, Peter Resty
- Remastered by Dan Hersch (2008 reissue)
- Cover illustration by Greg Hildebrandt
- Art direction by Richard Seireeni

== Release history ==
Region	Date	Label
United Kingdom	November 1981	Vertigo Records
United States	November 1981	Warner Bros. Records
Canada	November 1981	Warner Bros. Records
SFR Yugoslavia	1982	PGP-RTB/Philips
Mexico	1982	Vertigo Records
United Kingdom	1996	Castle Communications
United Kingdom	2004	Sanctuary Records
United States	October 2008	Rhino Records
United States	March 2021	Rhino Records

== Charts ==
=== Album ===
1981 chart performance for Mob Rules
Chart (1981)	Peak position
Canada Top Albums/CDs (RPM)	19
Dutch Albums (Album Top 100)	47
Finnish Albums (The Official Finnish Charts)	18
Japanese Albums (Oricon)	63
New Zealand Albums (RMNZ)	45
Swedish Albums (Sverigetopplistan)	30
UK Albums (Official Charts)	12
US Billboard 200	29

2022 chart performance for Mob Rules
Chart (2022)	Peak position
German Albums (Offizielle Top 100)	83
Scottish Albums (Official Charts)	51
UK Independent Albums (Official Charts)	23
UK Rock & Metal Albums (Official Charts)	8

=== Singles ===
Year	Song	Chart positions	
Year	Song	US Mainstream Rock	UK Singles Chart
1981	"The Mob Rules"	—	46
1982	"Turn Up the Night"	24	37
1982	"Voodoo"	46	—

== Sales and certifications ==
Region	Certification	Certified units/sales
Canada (Music Canada)	Gold	50,000^{^}
United Kingdom (BPI)	Gold	100,000^{‡}
United States (RIAA)	Gold	500,000^{^}
Yugoslavia	—	17,175
^{^} Shipments figures based on certification alone.^{‡} Sales+streaming figures based on certification alone.
