= Wendy Holden (author, born 1961) =

British author and war correspondent

- Born: 1961 (age 64–65); Pinner, North London
- Other name: Taylor Holden
- Occupations: Author and journalist

Wendy Holden (born 1961), also known as Taylor Holden, is an author, journalist and former war correspondent who has written more than forty books. She was born in Pinner, North London, and now lives in Suffolk, England.

Her bestselling title is Born Survivors: Three Young Mothers and Their Extraordinary Story of Courage, Defiance and Survival, a Goodreads finalist, published in over 20 countries. She is the ghostwriter of Captain Tom Moore's autobiography, Tomorrow Will Be A Good Day, published by Penguin Books on 17 September 2020. An audiobook edition is read by Sir Derek Jacobi.

== Publications ==
=== Novels ===
- The Teacher of Auschwitz, based on an inspiring true story, published in 2025 by Zaffre UK, by Harper Collins US, by Edizioni Piemme as Il Maestro Invisibile in Italy, by Sonia Draga as Nauczyciel z Auschwitz in Poland.
- The Sense of Paper: A Novel of Obsessions, about a former war correspondent running from the ghosts of her past, was published by Random House, New York in 2006 and as an e-book in 2013;
- Mr Scraps, 2013, a novella published as an ebook.
- The Cruelty of Beauty, about a female glassmaker in pre-revolution Czechoslovakia - published by Mlada Fronta in 2019 and as an ebook in English the same year.
- The novelisation of the film The Full Monty, which became an international bestseller in nine languages.

=== Non-fiction titles ===
- Her first book, Unlawful Carnal Knowledge, about the controversial Irish abortion case, was banned across Ireland;
- 10 Mindful Minutes: Giving Our Children and Ourselves the Social and Emotional Skills to Reduce Stress and Anxiety for Healthier, Happier Lives with Goldie Hawn, 2011, an international bestseller;
- Born Survivors: Three Young Mothers and Their Extraordinary Story of Courage, Defiance and Hope, published in 2015.
- Uggie, The Artist: My Story, 2012, a canine memoir published in five countries.
- Shell Shock: The Psychological Trauma of War, which accompanied a four-part television documentary for Channel 4.
- Shrink: The Diet for the Mind by Philippe Tahon

=== Biographies ===
- Intimate Audrey: An Authorized Biography, 2026, biography of Audrey Hepburn co-written with Sean Hepburn Ferrer
- Tomorrow Will Be A Good Day, 2020, memoir of Captain Sir Tom Moore, a number one Sunday Times bestseller
- Captain Tom's Life Lessons, 2021, by Captain Sir Tom Moore.
- A Woman of Firsts: The true story of a midwife who built a hospital and changed the world, 2019, by Edna And Ismail, a BBC Radio 4 Book of the Week.
- In the Name of Gucci, 2016, by Patricia Gucci published in eight languages.
- Lady Blue Eyes, 2011, a memoir of Frank Sinatra's widow Barbara Sinatra, a New York Times bestseller;
- A Lotus Grows in the Mud, 2005, the autobiography of Goldie Hawn
- Memories Are Made of This, 2004, a biography of Dean Martin as seen by his daughter, held by 1,083 libraries according to WorldCat;
- Behind Enemy Lines: the true story of a French Jewish spy in Nazi Germany, 2002, the autobiography of Marthe Cohn;
- Tomorrow to Be Brave, 2001, an autobiography of Susan Travers, the only woman in the French Foreign Legion during WWII;
- Till the Sun Grows Cold, a mother's account of her daughter's life and death in war-torn Sudan;
- Heaven and Hell: My Life in the Eagles (1974–2001), the autobiography of Don Felder, former lead guitarist of the Eagles;
- Kill Switch, an account of a former British soldier wrongly jailed in Afghanistan;
- Central 822, her autobiography of Carol Bristow, one of Scotland Yard’s first female detectives, was serialised globally on BBC Radio;
- Footprints in the Snow, the story of a paraplegic, was made into a television film starring Caroline Quentin and Kevin Whately;
- Haatchi & Little B, the tale of a boy with Schwartz–Jampel syndrome and his three-legged dog published in twelve countries in 2014;
- One Hundred Miracles: A Memoir of Music and Survival, an autobiography of Zuzana Růžičková, Holocaust survivor and harpsichordist, 2019, published in nine languages.
