= American Rock 'n' Roll =

Studio album by Don Felder
- Released: April 5, 2019
- Studio: EastWest Studios (Hollywood, California): The Village Recorder (Los Angeles, California); The Seance Room (Sherman Oaks, California); Top Ten Studios (Glenolden, Pennsylvania)
- Length: 43:14
- Label: BMG Rights Management
- Producer: Don Felder

Don Felder chronology
Road to Forever (2012)	American Rock 'n' Roll (2019)	The Vault – Fifty Years of Music (2025)

Professional ratings
Review scores
Source	Rating
AllMusic	2.5/5 stars

American Rock 'n' Roll is the third solo studio album by American musician Don Felder, best known as a longtime member of Eagles. It was released April 5, 2019 through BMG Rights Management.

The front cover features a Gibson EDS-1275 double-neck guitar.

The album features many musicians such as Slash, Joe Satriani, Mick Fleetwood, Sammy Hagar, and Chad Smith.

== Track listing ==
All songs by Don Felder, except where noted.

1. "American Rock 'N' Roll" (feat. Slash, Mick Fleetwood and Chad Smith) - 3:41
2. "Charmed" (feat. Alex Lifeson) - 3:17
3. "Falling in Love" - 4:25
4. "Hearts on Fire" (Don Felder and David Paich) - 4:32
5. "Limelight" (feat. Orianthi and Richie Sambora) - 3:47
6. "Little Latin Lover" - 3:34
7. "Rock You" (feat. Bob Weir, Joe Satriani and Sammy Hagar) - 3:42
8. "She Doesn't Get It" - 3:35
9. "Sun" - 4:32
10. "The Way Things Have to Be" (feat. Peter Frampton) - 4:21
11. "You're My World" - 3:48

== Personnel ==
- Don Felder – lead vocals, lead guitar (1), rhythm guitar (1), electric guitars (2–5, 7–11), backing vocals (2, 9), acoustic guitars (3, 6, 9–11), guitar solo (5)
- Mike Finnigan – Hammond B3 organ (2, 5, 7, 10, 11)
- Steve Porcaro – keyboards (3), synthesizers (3)
- David Paich – keyboards (4), acoustic piano (10)
- Alex Alessandroni – acoustic piano (6), additional keyboards (10)
- Christophe Lampidécchia – accordion (6)
- Kenneth Crouch – keyboards (11)
- Slash – special guest guitar (1)
- Alex Lifeson – acoustic rhythm guitar on bridge (2), electric guitar solo ending (2)
- Orianthi – guitars (5), vocal solo (5)
- Richie Sambora – guitars (5), vocal solo (5)
- Joe Satriani – guitar solo (7)
- Greg Leisz – pedal steel guitar (9)
- Peter Frampton – Fender Telecaster guitar (10), special guest backing vocals (10)
- Nathan East – bass (1–3, 9)
- Alex Al – bass (4), Moog bass (4)
- Chris Chaney – bass (5, 7, 10, 11)
- Abraham Laboriel – bass (6)
- Ben White – bass (8)
- Mick Fleetwood – drums (1)
- Chad Smith – drums (1)
- Robin DiMaggio – drums (2–4, 7, 11), percussion (3, 9), drum programming (4, 8), additional percussion (6), handclaps (6)
- Todd Sucherman – drums (8)
- Steve Gadd – drums (9)
- Jim Keltner – drums (10, 11)
- Lenny Castro – percussion (1, 2, 5–8, 10, 11)
- Joe Williams – additional programming (4), backing vocals (4)
- Monét Owens – backing vocals (1, 3, 6, 8, 11)
- Timothy Drury – backing vocals (2, 9)
- Sammy Hagar – special guest vocals (7)
- Bob Weir – chorus backing vocals (7)
- Leah Felder – backing vocals (10)

=== Production ===
- Don Felder – producer
- Julian Chan – engineer
- Ed Cherney – engineer
- Brett Cookingham – engineer
- Lynn Peterson – engineer
- J.R. Taylor – engineer
- Bob Clearmountain – mixing at Mix This! (Pacific Palisades, California)
- Bernie Grundman – mastering at Bernie Grundman Mastering (Hollywood, California)
- Michael Helms – photography
- Bernie Taupin – cover artwork
- Bill Young – layout, additional artwork

== Charts ==
Chart	Peak position
Belgian Albums (Ultratop Wallonia)	139
German Albums (Offizielle Top 100)	83
US Independent Albums (Billboard)	18
