= A Lotus Grows in the Mud =

2005 memoir by Goldie Hawn

- Author: Goldie Hawn with Wendy Holden
- Language: English
- Subject: Memoir
- Publisher: Putnam Pub Group
- Publication date: 2005
- Publication place: United States
- Pages: 446
- ISBN: 978-0-399-15285-6

A Lotus Grows in the Mud is a memoir written by Goldie Hawn in 2005, with author Wendy Holden.

The memoir was written about past episodes and encounters with family, friends, co-workers and complete strangers Hawn has met and known throughout her lifetime. Using a reflective writing style and introspection Hawn writes the memoir in a first person narrative from notes she had taken over the years from her personal diary. The memoir sold over 1 million copies and made the New York Times Bestseller list.

The memoir is available in different formats, including hardback and paperback books, a CD or electronic audio book file format, which can be downloaded over the internet. Hawn does the entire audio voice herself and the running time is 5 hours and 43 minutes.

The memoir is made up of 35 individual stories, which are separated by 16 mini-short-stories called "Postcards", consisting of poems, words of wisdom, and personal reflections. Inserted into the book are two major sections of photographs, 23 color photos and 33 black-and-white photos, as well as 10 other photos that are placed between stories.

While the stories themselves are in a chronological order, not every event or person Hawn has ever known are discussed. At the conclusion of most of the stories, Hawn goes on to relate how those particular circumstances and encounters with people taught her valuable lessons and values in life. She also includes descriptions of how those pieces of knowledge could be passed on and used to teach children in the future.

In the preface, Hawn points out that the main purpose of the book is to speak from her heart about past events along life's journey and how she has been affected and changed from those experiences and encounters which she calls her "Gifts".

This spiritual quote, which led to the title of the book, Hawn received from the Venerable Thupten Ngodrup. He is the Nechung Oracle of the Nechung Dorje Drayang Ling Monastery in Dharamsala, India.

"The lotus is the most beautiful flower, whose petals open one by one. But it will only grow in the mud. In order to grow and gain wisdom, first you must have the mud --- the obstacles of life and its suffering. ... The mud speaks of the common ground that humans share, no matter what our stations in life. ... Whether we have it all or we have nothing, we are all faced with the same obstacles: sadness, loss, illness, dying and death. If we are to strive as human beings to gain more wisdom, more kindness and more compassion, we must have the intention to grow as a lotus and open each petal one by one".
