= Captain Sternn =

- Captain Sternn with Beezer; Art by Bernie Wrightson

Publication information
- Publisher: Heavy Metal; Kitchen Sink Press
- First appearance: In print: Heavy Metal Vol. 4, #3 (June 1980); In animation: Heavy Metal (animated movie, 1981)
- Created by: Bernie Wrightson

In-story information
- Full name: Lincoln F. Sternn
- Partnerships: Beezer; Hanover Fiste

Captain Lincoln F. Sternn is a comic book character created by Bernie Wrightson.

The character appeared in the animated film Heavy Metal voiced by Eugene Levy.

== Personality and appearance ==
Captain Sternn is considered "part Han Solo, part James Garner from The Great Escape". The character, as written by Wrightson, is an amoral space captain whose adventures are set in the future. Sternn is sometimes considered a criminal with charges ranging from rape to piracy.

He is associated with supporting characters Hanover Fiste and Justine Tyme.

He is drawn as a caricature of Superman, although his clothing is different; he wears a pseudo-military uniform. He is always accompanied by a small, levitating one-eyed robot, named Beezer, that is his most faithful companion.

== Creation ==
First conceptualized in the late 1970s, Captain Sternn was developed by artist Bernie Wrightson during his time at The Studio. The character's first published adventure was developed for Tyrannosaurus Press in 1977, and it was eventually published in 1980 in Heavy Metal magazine.

== Publication history ==
- Heavy Metal Vol.4, #3 (June, 1980) - "Captain Sternn" (reprinted in Heavy Metal Special: One Step Beyond (January, 1996))
- Dreadstar #6 (September, 1983) - "The Interstellar Toybox"
- Amazing Heroes #194 (September, 1991)
- Captain Sternn: Running Out of Time #1-5 (1993 - 1994), initially intended to be published through Tundra Publishing prior to its closure. Eventually published by Kitchen Sink Press
- Heavy Metal: The Movie (October, 1996) - "Captain Sternn" ^{a}

== Film adaptation ==
Captain Sternn's original story was adapted as the segment "Captain Sternn" of the cult classic film Heavy Metal (1981). He was voiced by Eugene Levy, with the rest of the cast in that segment consisting of Rodger Bumpass as Hanover Fiste, Joe Flaherty as Sternn's lawyer Charlie, John Vernon as the prosecutor, and Douglas Kenney as the bailiff Regolian. Hanover Fiste's transformation was caused by the Loc-Nar that came before him after the Den segment. Unlike the original story, there is an additional scene where Sternn opens a trap door under Hanover Fiste, ejecting him into space as the Loc-Nar that Hanover had disappears into the film's next segment.

== References in other works ==
Captain Sternn tries to hit on Julie in the strip club in the novelization to Heavy Metal 2000.

Hanover Fiste was mentioned by name several times in the Dreadstar book, both in the Bernie Wrightson stories starring Aldo Gorney published in issue #6-7 and by Tuetun in issue #12.

Hanover Fiste's lines were used in the Webcomic Freefall. The judge uttering the lines looked similar to the animated version of Hanover Fiste from the Heavy Metal movie.

== Notes ==
^{a} This is the comic version of the segment "Captain Sternn" of the Heavy Metal film, not the original story.
