= Live Evil (Black Sabbath album) =

Live album by Black Sabbath
- Released: January 1983
- Recorded: 18, 24 April, 12–13 May 1982 in Seattle, Dallas and San Antonio
- Genre: Heavy metal
- Length: 83:27
- Label: Vertigo
- Producers: Tony Iommi; Geezer Butler

Black Sabbath chronology
Mob Rules (1981)	Live Evil (1983)	Born Again (1983)

Professional ratings
Review scores
Source	Rating
AllMusic	2/5 stars
Blender	3/5 stars

Live Evil is the first official live album by the English heavy metal band Black Sabbath, recorded during their Mob Rules Tour (1981–1982). The previously released Live at Last (1980) was not sanctioned by the band. Live Evil peaked at number 37 on the Billboard Pop Albums chart.

== Recording ==
In early 1982, Black Sabbath's publishing deal with their previous management expired. By re-recording several songs from their earlier catalog and releasing them as a live album, all the songwriters stood to see a hefty profit from the publishing royalties. The liner notes state that the album was recorded in Seattle, San Antonio and Dallas during the Mob Rules Tour, but doesn't give specific information on which songs were performed in which location. However, 2023's 40th Anniversary Deluxe Edition does indicate each song's recording date and location, as noted below.

In his autobiography Iron Man: My Journey Through Heaven & Hell with Black Sabbath, guitarist Tony Iommi recalls that the band's live show during this period featured "lots of pyro with fire and bombs" and that while playing the Hammersmith Odeon the bombs had been tested and "blew a two-foot-wide hole in the floor on my side. If I'd been there, I would have been blown up. Christ, it was dangerous." Iommi also admits that the band had to cancel a show at Madison Square Garden when the bombs blew out the tubes in all the amps during the first note of the first song "War Pigs". In the liner notes to the 2008 retrospective The Rules of Hell, vocalist Ronnie James Dio remembers, "It was an excellent tour. I think we were probably riding quite high on the Heaven and Hell success, and so we ended up playing really, really well. Even towards the end the shows were still great." Tension, however, had been building for some time between the band members, with rock journalist Steffan Chirazi observing in 2008 that the story behind the creation of Live Evil is one of "quiet yet savagely visceral turmoil and a band collapsing under their weight of silence, unspoken accusation, and an unforgiving schedule."

Of the oddly distant crowd sound, Iommi remarked: "We forgot about the audience!" In the same interview, asked to choose "a track that the engineer didn't cock up", he said: "I liked 'Heaven and Hell' flowing into 'Sign of the Southern Cross'. It had its moments, that one."

== Breakup ==
During the mixing of Live Evil, Dio and drummer Vinny Appice abruptly left the group, leaving original members Iommi and Geezer Butler to carry on. The two factions would provide vastly different accounts of what transpired as things fell apart.

"Ronnie had started to take over a little bit too much and was becoming a bit of a Hitler", Iommi explained to Steve Gett of Guitar for the Practicing Musician. "We were working on the Live Evil record in Los Angeles, and in fact we nicknamed him 'Little Hitler'". In his 2011 memoir, Iommi was considerably less harsh in his summation of Dio's behaviour, stating "By then Ronnie did come over a little more...I suppose, bossy. The way he conducted himself, the way he talked, it might have given that impression to the outside world, but he usually didn't mean anything by it. Ronnie was just very outspoken." Iommi also contends that he and bassist Geezer Butler were concerned about Dio already rehearsing with other musicians for a proposed solo album offered to him by Warner Brothers Records.

Dio's account attributed the breakup to a misunderstanding arising as the result of Iommi's drug abuse. Dio has stated that while he and Appice were not interested in drugs, Iommi and Butler were using cocaine very heavily at that time. When Dio and Appice arrived at the studio to begin the Live Evil mixing process, Iommi and Butler never showed up. While waiting for their bandmates at the studio over a period of several days, Dio and Appice passed the time by listening to the recordings and frequently experimented with the mix by asking the engineer to adjust the levels of various parts. No mixing had commenced, and the tracks were merely being listened to. When Iommi arrived days later, he asked the engineer what Dio had been doing in his absence and was told that he had frequently requested that the vocals be brought up higher in the mix. Iommi, in his drug-addled state, misunderstood what he was being told and came to the conclusion that Dio was not only mixing the album without him, but was trying to push his own vocals much too prominently in the mix. Iommi, a founding member of the band, reckoned he had a power struggle on his hands and he wasn't about to relinquish creative control of Black Sabbath. Dio steadfastly denied that he altered the mix and accused Iommi and Butler of fabricating the story. Iommi later laid the blame on the engineer. On the Neon Nights: 30 Years of Heaven and Hell DVD, both Dio and Appice claim the mixing sessions were scheduled to start in the early afternoon but, on the third day, Iommi and Butler didn't show up until much later. This exacerbated the rift between the new and original members until the singer was asked to leave. In the same interview series, Butler described the Live Evil mixing sessions as "the Yanks against the Brits," adding, "I think Ronnie seemed to desperately want to do his own stuff and we sort of wanted to keep it going as it was." In the liner notes to The Rules of Hell, Appice states, "I knew things were coming to a close from some of the things that were happening on the road. Ronnie and I would ride in one car, Geezer and Tony in another car, and everybody was breaking away from each other a little bit."

== Release ==
Iommi has said that the decision to release Live Evil was prompted by two factors. The first was the 1980 release of the unsanctioned Live at Last album, and the second was former lead vocalist Ozzy Osbourne's 1982 release of a live album consisting entirely of Black Sabbath songs. In his autobiography, Iommi confesses that he was "unpleasantly surprised" that Osbourne had included only Sabbath songs and speculates "I think putting out the live album like that was down to Sharon (Osbourne, Ozzy's wife and manager), trying to put the cat among the pigeons." At the time, Sharon was severely at odds with her father Don Arden, who was managing Sabbath and was attempting to steer Osbourne away from his deal with Arden's label, Jet, and on to a new deal with Jet's distribution company, CBS. "We had to give the old man two albums, well, a live album counted as two," she is quoted as saying in Mick Wall's 2013 biography on the band. "I knew he'd go for it because it wouldn't cost anything to make...But Don was expecting something with Randy (Rhoads) on it and I just thought fuck that. I'm not giving him that. He can have something with a load of old Sabbath shit on it."

The album is included in the Black Sabbath box set The Rules of Hell. The Live Evil album cover features literal interpretations of Sabbath songs.

On 12 April 2023, Iommi, Butler, and Dio's official social media accounts across several sites, as well as the Rhino website, announced the reissue of Live Evil as a Super Deluxe box set on 2 June 2023 (19 May in the U.S.). It included the original album remastered and a remix of the album from the original analogue master tapes by longtime band associate Wyn Davis across four compact discs and four LPs. The physical versions also come with an illustrated hardback book that include new liner notes and replicas of the concert book and poster from the Mob Rules tour.

== Reception ==
Live Evil hit both the UK Top 30 and the US Top 40 Album charts. AllMusic states that "Live Evil does benefit from a crystal clear, in-your-face sound, and by showcasing even amounts of both Ozzy and Dio material, effectively documents Black Sabbath's renascent tours of the early '80s. Ronnie certainly has the vocal chops, if not the same everyman charm, to handle the Osbourne classics, but his incessant banter between (and during!) songs sometimes verges on the unbearable."

In a contemporary review in Kerrang!, Peter Makowski said the album "captures Sabs Mk 2 at their best. One of my top five live albums of all time. It's a perfectly balanced, well-produced, accurate representation of the group."

== Track listing ==
Side A
No.	Title	Writer(s)	Original album	Length
1.	"E5150"	Geezer Butler, Ronnie James Dio, Tony Iommi	Mob Rules (1981)	2:21
2.	"Neon Knights"	Butler, Dio, Iommi, Bill Ward	Heaven and Hell (1980)	4:36
3.	"N.I.B."	Butler, Iommi, Ozzy Osbourne, Ward	Black Sabbath (1970)	5:09
4.	"Children of the Sea"	Butler, Dio, Iommi, Ward	Heaven and Hell	6:05
5.	"Voodoo"	Butler, Dio, Iommi	Mob Rules	6:07

Side B
No.	Title	Writer(s)	Original album	Length
6.	"Black Sabbath"	Butler, Iommi, Osbourne, Ward	Black Sabbath	8:39
7.	"War Pigs" (includes Vinny Appice drum solo)	Butler, Iommi, Osbourne, Ward	Paranoid (1970)	9:19
8.	"Iron Man"	Butler, Iommi, Osbourne, Ward	Paranoid	7:29

Side C
No.	Title	Writer(s)	Original album	Length
9.	"The Mob Rules"	Butler, Dio, Iommi	Mob Rules	4:10
10.	"Heaven and Hell" (includes Tony Iommi guitar solo)	Butler, Dio, Iommi, Ward	Heaven and Hell	12:04

Side D
No.	Title	Writer(s)	Original album	Length
11.	"The Sign of the Southern Cross / Heaven and Hell (Continued)"	Butler, Dio, Iommi / Butler, Dio, Iommi, Ward	Mob Rules / Heaven and Hell	7:15
12.	"Paranoid" (includes "Heaven and Hell" reprise)	Butler, Iommi, Osbourne, Ward	Paranoid	3:46
13.	"Children of the Grave"	Butler, Iommi, Osbourne, Ward	Master of Reality (1971)	5:25
14.	"Fluff"	Butler, Iommi, Osbourne, Ward	Sabbath Bloody Sabbath (1973)	0:59

=== Various releases ===
- The UK cassette release had, as its first side, sides 1 and 3 of the vinyl release, with side two of the cassette being vinyl sides 2 and 4. It seems this was not a mistake, rather a money-saving exercise, since the running-times of the two sides of the tape were more-or-less equal in this configuration.
- The US cassette release has, as its first side, sides 1 and almost all of 2 except for "Iron Man" which fades out at end of Side 1. Then the second side began with "Iron Man" (via fade in) and sides 3 and 4 were intact. This was done to make the sides of the cassette of nearly equal length.
- The first UK CD release omitted "War Pigs" (or "Warpigs" as it was titled in the explanation for its cutting, printed on the rear of the tray-insert), so as to fit onto a single CD. The 1996 UK remaster restored this track but cut much of the stage banter, so as to again fit onto a single CD: this reduced the 'live' feel of the recordings.
- In the US Warner Brothers released a 2-CD set, which matched the running order of the vinyl. Each of these WB CDs came in its own jewel case, complete with artwork, rather than a 2CD jewel case.
- Universal Music Corporation released a "deluxe edition" worldwide in 2010 which contained the entire album in its original running order.
- Warner Bros/Rhino Records (USA & Canada) and BMG (Europe) released a 40th Anniversary Super Deluxe Edition box set in 2023, with both the original mix, and a 2023 remix by Wyn Davis.

=== Recording date details ===
According to the 40th Anniversary Super Deluxe Edition release in 2023, the recording date and location details are:

- April 18, 1982 at Selland Arena, Fresno, CA: tracks 13–14
- April 24, 1982 at Seattle Center Arena: Seattle, WA: tracks 1–2, 9
- May 12, 1982 at Dallas Convention Center, Dallas, TX: track 6
- May 13, 1982 at San Antonio Convention Center, San Antonio, TX: tracks 3–5, 7–8, 10–12

== Personnel ==
Black Sabbath

- Tony Iommi – guitars
- Geezer Butler – bass
- Ronnie James Dio – vocals (credited as Ronnie Dio on the original 1983 release)
- Vinny Appice – drums

Additional performers

- Geoff Nicholls – keyboards

Neither Appice nor Nicholls are given full credit as members of Black Sabbath, instead being listed under the "Special Thanks" section of the back cover of the 1983 release. While Nicholls was not an official member of the band at this point, Appice was, which makes the "Special Thanks" credit unusual.

Production

- Recorded with The Record Plant Mobile, Los Angeles
- Engineered by Lee De Carlo and Bill Freesh
- Mobile crew: Bill Hutcheson, Jim Scott, Scott Stogel
- Mixed at The Record Plant, Los Angeles
- Remastered by Dan Hersch (2008 reissue)
- Album cover concept by Paul Clark
- Art direction and design by Jay Vigon
- Illustration by Stan Watts
- Photography by Mark Weiss and Par Harbron

== Release history ==
Region	Date	Label
United Kingdom	January 1983	Vertigo Records
United States	17 January 1983	Warner Bros. Records
Canada	1983	Warner Bros. Records
Japan	1983	Vertigo Records
Germany	1983	Vertigo Records
Netherlands	1983	Phonogram GmbH
Israel	1983	Phonokol/Vertigo
Venezuela	1983	Polydor Records
South Korea	1986	Vertigo Records
United Kingdom	1996	Castle Communications
United Kingdom	2004	Sanctuary Records
United States	October 2008	Rhino Records

== Charts ==
1983 chart performance for Live Evil
Chart (1983)	Peak position
Canada Top Albums/CDs (RPM)	22
Dutch Albums (Album Top 100)	34
Finnish Albums (The Official Finnish Charts)	10
German Albums (Offizielle Top 100)	37
Japanese Albums (Oricon)	35
New Zealand Albums (RMNZ)	34
Swedish Albums (Sverigetopplistan)	15
UK Albums (Official Charts)	13
US Billboard 200	37

2023 chart performance for Live Evil
Chart (2023)	Peak position
Scottish Albums (Official Charts)	100
Swiss Albums (Schweizer Hitparade)	91
UK Independent Albums (Official Charts)	35
UK Rock & Metal Albums (Official Charts)	19
