= Heavy Metal (film) =

1981 Canadian animated film

- Theatrical release poster
- Directed by: Gerald Potterton
- Screenplay by: Daniel Goldberg; Len Blum
- Based on: Original art and stories by: Richard Corben; Angus McKie; Dan O'Bannon; Thomas Warkentin; Bernie Wrightson
- Produced by: Ivan Reitman
- Starring: Rodger Bumpass; Jackie Burroughs; John Candy; Joe Flaherty; Don Francks; Martin Lavut; Marilyn Lightstone; Eugene Levy; Alice Playten; Harold Ramis; Susan Roman; Richard Romanus; August Schellenberg; John Vernon; Zal Yanovsky
- Edited by: Ian Llande; Mick Manning; Gerald Tripp
- Music by: Elmer Bernstein
- Color process: Metrocolor
- Production companies: Guardian Trust Company; Canadian Film Development Corporation; Famous Players; Potterton Productions
- Distributed by: Columbia Pictures
- Release date: August 7, 1981
- Running time: 90 minutes
- Country: Canada
- Language: English
- Budget: $9.3 million
- Box office: $20.1 million

Heavy Metal is a 1981 Canadian adult animated science fantasy anthology film directed by Gerald Potterton (in his directorial debut) and produced by Ivan Reitman and Leonard Mogel, who also was the publisher of Heavy Metal magazine, which was the basis for the film. It starred the voices of Rodger Bumpass, Jackie Burroughs, John Candy, Joe Flaherty, Don Francks, Martin Lavut, Marilyn Lightstone, Eugene Levy, Alice Playten, Harold Ramis, Percy Rodriguez, Susan Roman, Richard Romanus, August Schellenberg, John Vernon, and Zal Yanovsky. The screenplay was written by Daniel Goldberg and Len Blum.

The film is an anthology of various science-fiction and fantasy stories tied together by a single theme of an evil force that is "the sum of all evils". It was adapted from Heavy Metal magazine and original stories in the same spirit. Like the magazine, the film features a great deal of graphic violence, sexuality, and nudity. Its production was expedited by having several animation houses working simultaneously on different segments.

Heavy Metal was released by Columbia Pictures on August 7, 1981. Upon release, the film received mixed reviews from critics and was a moderate commercial success. However, it has since achieved a cult following. Its soundtrack was packaged by music manager Irving Azoff. It included several popular rock bands and artists, including Black Sabbath, Blue Öyster Cult, Sammy Hagar, Don Felder, Cheap Trick, DEVO, Journey, and Nazareth, among others.

A sequel, Heavy Metal 2000, was released in 2000.

== Plot ==
=== "Soft Landing" ===
The title sequence was based on the comic of the same name by Dan O'Bannon and Thomas Warkentin.

The title sequence story opens with a Space Shuttle orbiting the Earth. The bay doors open, releasing a 1960 Corvette. An astronaut seated in the car then begins descending through Earth's atmosphere, landing in a desert canyon.

Crew

- Jimmy T. Murakami and John Bruno – directors
- John Coates – producer
- Dan O'Bannon – writer
- Thomas Warkentin – art direction

Music

- "Radar Rider" by Riggs

Studio

- MGM Titles
- T.V. Cartoons Ltd

=== "Grimaldi" ===
In the framing story, the astronaut Grimaldi arrives at home where he is greeted by his daughter. He says he has something to show her. When he opens his case, a green, crystalline sphere rises out and melts him. It introduces itself to the terrified girl as "the sum of all evils". Looking into the orb known as the Loc-Nar, the girl sees how it has influenced societies throughout time and space.

Cast

- Percy Rodriguez (uncredited) as Loc-Nar
- Don Francks as Grimaldi
- Caroline Semple as Girl

Crew

- Harold Whitaker – director
- John Halas – producer

Studio

- Halas & Batchelor Animation Ltd

=== "Harry Canyon" ===
Original story by Daniel Goldberg and Len Blum; based on The Long Tomorrow by Moebius.

In a dystopian and crime-ridden New York City in 2031, cynical taxicab driver Harry Canyon narrates his day in film noir style, grumbling about his fares and frequent robbery attempts he thwarts with a disintegrator installed in the back of his seat. He stumbles into an incident where he rescues a red-haired young woman from Rudnick, a gangster who murdered her father. She explains that her father discovered the Loc-Nar, and they have been pursued relentlessly by people attempting to obtain it. Harry takes her to his apartment, where they have sex. She decides to sell the Loc-Nar to Rudnick and split the money with Harry. Rudnick is disintegrated by the Loc-Nar at the exchange, and she attempts to double-cross Harry to keep the money for herself. When she pulls out a gun, Harry uses the disintegrator on her. He keeps the money, and summarizes the incident as a "two-day ride with one hell of a tip".

Cast

- Harvey Atkin as Alien, Henchman
- John Candy as Desk Sergeant
- Marilyn Lightstone as Whore
- Susan Roman as Girl, Satellite
- Richard Romanus as Harry Canyon
- Al Waxman as Rudnick

Crew

- Pino van Lamsweerde – director
- W. H. Stevens Jr. – producer
- Vic Atkinson – producer
- Daniel Goldberg – writer
- Len Blum – writer

Music

- "Veteran of the Psychic Wars" by Blue Öyster Cult
- "True Companion" by Donald Fagen
- "Blue Lamp" by Stevie Nicks
- "Open Arms" by Journey
- "Heartbeat" by Riggs

Studio

- Atkinson Film-Arts

=== "Den" ===
Based on the character of the same name created by Richard Corben.

A nerdy teenager finds a "green meteorite" near his house and adds it to his rock collection. During a lightning experiment, the orb hurls the young man into the world of Neverwhere, where he transforms into a naked, muscular man called Den, an acronym for his earth name, David Ellis Norman. There, Den witnesses a strange ritual, rescuing a beautiful young woman who is about to be sacrificed to Uhluhtc. Reaching safety, she introduces herself as Katherine Wells from the British colony of Gibraltar. The two start having sex, but are interrupted by the minions of Ard, an immortal man who wants to obtain the Loc-Nar for himself. After being taken to see Ard, Den demands to see Katherine. His request is ignored and Ard orders his men to castrate Den. Den fights off the soldiers and shoots Ard, who heals immediately. The girl turns out to be sleeping, encased in glass under a spell where only Ard can awaken her. Ard offers Den a deal: if he gets the Loc-Nar from the Queen and brings it to him, the girl will be released. Den agrees and infiltrates the palace along with Ard's best soldier, Norl. They are promptly caught by the Queen's guards, but she offers leniency if Den has sex with her. He complies, thereby distracting the Queen while the raiding party steals the Loc-Nar. Den escapes and races back to rescue Katherine from Ard. Recreating the lightning incident that drew him to Neverwhere, he is able to banish Ard and the Queen. Den suspects that they were teleported to Earth. Refusing the opportunity to take the Loc-Nar for himself, Den rides with Katherine into the sunset, content to remain in Neverwhere. As for the Loc-Nar, it rises into the sky and lands on a space station where it is picked up by someone else.

Cast

- John Candy as Den
- Jackie Burroughs as Katherine Wells
- Martin Lavut as Ard
- Marilyn Lightstone as Queen
- August Schellenberg as Norl

Crew

- Jack Stokes – director
- Jerry Hibbert – producer
- Richard Corben – writer

Studio

- Votetone

=== "Captain Sternn" ===
Based on the character of the same name created by Bernie Wrightson.

On a space station, crooked space captain Lincoln F. Sternn is on trial by the 'Federation' for numerous serious charges, including multiple counts of murder, rape, piracy, fraud, armed theft, and one moving violation. Pleading "not guilty" against the advice of his lawyer Charlie, who fears Sternn will be found guilty and executed, Sternn explains that he expects to be acquitted because he bribed a witness named Hanover Fiste. Fiste takes the stand, revealing him to be the man who discovered the Loc-Nar aboard the station earlier. Fidgeting with the now marble-sized Loc-Nar as he testifies, Fiste initially praises Sternn's moral character, but the Loc-Nar begins influencing him to blurt out highly incriminating statements about Sternn instead. Becoming increasingly enraged at Sternn as he testifies to his misdeeds and crimes, Fiste transforms into a hulking muscular brute. Fiste ends his testimony urging for Sternn's execution and chases him throughout the station, breaking through bulkheads and wreaking havoc. Eventually, Fiste corners Sternn, who gives him his promised payoff, and he promptly shrinks back to his scrawny original form. Sternn opens a trap door under Fiste, ejecting him into space. The Loc-Nar enters Earth's atmosphere with Fiste's flaming severed hand still clinging to it.

Cast

- Rodger Bumpass as Hanover Fiste
- Joe Flaherty as Charlie, the lawyer
- Douglas Kenney as Regolian
- Eugene Levy as Captain Lincoln F. Sternn
- John Vernon as Prosecutor

Crew

- Julian Szuchopa – director
- Paul Sebella – director
- Bernie Wrightson – writer

Music

- "Reach Out" by Cheap Trick

Studio

- Boxcar Animation Studios Inc

=== "Neverwhere Land" ===
Because of time constraints, a segment called "Neverwhere Land", which would have connected "Captain Sternn" to "B-17", was cut.

The story follows the influence of the Loc-Nar upon the evolution of a planet, from the Loc-Nar landing in a body of water, influencing the rise of the industrial age, and a world war. This original story was created by Cornelius Cole III.

The original rough animatics are set to a loop of the beginning of Pink Floyd's "Time". The 1996 VHS release included this segment at the end of the tape. On the DVD release, this segment is included as a bonus feature. In both released versions, the sequence is set to the music of "Passacaglia" (from Magnificat), composed and conducted by Krzysztof Penderecki and with animation studio being produced by Duck Soup Produckions.

=== "B-17" ===
A World War II B-17 bomber nicknamed the Pacific Pearl makes a difficult bombing run and suffers heavy damage with all of the crew except the pilot and co-pilot killed by gunfire. As the bomber limps home, the co-pilot goes back to check on the crew. Finding nothing but dead bodies, he notices the Loc-Nar trailing the plane. Informing the pilot, he heads back to the cockpit, when the Loc-Nar rams itself into the plane and reanimates the dead crew members as zombies. The co-pilot is killed, while the pilot parachutes away in time. He lands on an island where he finds a graveyard of airplanes from various times, along with the wrecked airplanes' zombified airmen, who surround him, sealing the horrified pilot's fate.

Cast

- Don Francks as Co-Pilot (Holden)
- George Touliatos as Pilot (Skip)
- Zal Yanovsky as Navigator

Crew

- Barrie Nelson – director
- W. H. Stevens Jr. – producer
- Dan O'Bannon – writer

Music

- "Heavy Metal (Takin' a Ride)" by Don Felder

Studio

- Atkinson Film-Arts

=== "So Beautiful & So Dangerous" ===
Based on the comic of the same name by Angus McKie.

Dr. Anrak, a prominent scientist, arrives at The Pentagon for a meeting regarding mysterious mutations that are plaguing the United States. At the meeting, the doctor tries to dismiss the occurrences. When he sees the Loc-Nar in the locket of Gloria, a beautiful buxom stenographer, he begins to behave erratically and motorboats her. A colossal starship drills through the roof and abducts the doctor and, by accident, Gloria. The ship's robot is irritated at Anrak, who is actually a malfunctioning android, but its mood changes when it sees Gloria. With the help of the ship's alien pilot Edsel and co-pilot Zeke, the robot convinces Gloria to stay on board and have "robot sex" (albeit off-screen). Meanwhile, Edsel and Zeke snort a huge amount of a powdered drug called Plutonian Nyborg before flying home, zoning out on the cosmos. Too intoxicated to fly straight, they crash-land unharmed in a huge space station.

Cast

- Rodger Bumpass as Dr. Anrak
- John Candy as Robot
- Joe Flaherty as General
- Eugene Levy as Male Reporter / Edsel
- Alice Playten as Gloria
- Harold Ramis as Zeke
- Patty Dworkin as Female Reporter
- Warren Munson as Senator

Crew

- John Halas – director
- Angus McKie – writer

Music

- "Queen Bee" by Grand Funk Railroad
- "I Must Be Dreamin'" by Cheap Trick
- "Crazy? (A Suitable Case for Treatment)" by Nazareth
- "All of You" by Don Felder
- "Prefabricated" by Trust
- "Heavy Metal" by Sammy Hagar

Studio

- Halas & Batchelor Animation Ltd

=== "Taarna" ===
Original story by Daniel Goldberg and Len Blum; based on Arzach by Moebius.

The Loc-Nar, now the size of a giant meteor, crashes into a volcano on another world and draws a large mass of curious people. As they begin to climb the volcano, it erupts and green slime covers the crowd, mutating them into an evil barbarian army. The mutants subsequently attack a nearby city of peaceful scholars. Desperate, the city leaders mentally summon the Taarakians, a once powerful yet now declining warrior race with whom the city had a pact, but the city falls before the call can be answered.

Taarna, a beautiful and mute warrior and the last of the Taarakians, receives the summons. After ritually preparing herself, she and her avian mount fly to the beleaguered city, only to find the citizens dead. Determined to avenge them, she begins following the trail of their murderers and encounters a small band of the mutant barbarians. After killing them and with more information at hand, she travels towards the mutant camp, but she and her mount are captured.

Taarna is tortured and thrown into an open pit, unconscious. Her mount escapes and rescues her. She tries going for the Loc-Nar, but the mutants pursue and shoot her mount down. The mutant leader faces Taarna in a duel to the death, wounding her, but Taarna manages to kill him. With the last of their strength, Taarna and her companion make a death flight to the volcano. As they approach, the Loc-Nar warns her off, claiming that sacrificing herself would be futile. Ignoring the Loc-Nar, Taarna unleashes the power imbued in her sword and dives into the volcano, destroying the Loc-Nar.

Cast

- Percy Rodriguez (uncredited) as Loc-Nar
- Thor Bishopric as Boy
- Ned Conlon as Councilman #1
- Len Doncheff as Barbarian #1
- Don Francks as Barbarian #2
- Joseph Golland as Councilman #2
- Charles Joliffe as Councilman #3
- Mavor Moore as Elder
- August Schellenberg as Taarak
- Cedric Smith as Bartender
- George Touliatos as Barbarian #3
- Vlasta Vrána as Barbarian Leader
- Zal Yanovsky as Barbarian #4

Music

- "E5150" by Black Sabbath
- "The Mob Rules" by Black Sabbath
- "Through Being Cool" by Devo

=== "Epilogue" ===
As the final story ends, the Loc-Nar that was terrorizing the girl destabilizes and begins breaking up. The girl flees from it and her home. The Loc-Nar then explodes, destroying the mansion in the process. Taarna's reborn mount appears outside and the girl happily flies away on it. It is then revealed that Taarna's soul has been reincarnated in the girl, transforming her into a new Taarakian.

Cast

- Percy Rodriguez (uncredited) as Loc-Nar

Music

- "Working in the Coal Mine" by Devo

== Production ==
Ivan Reitman gained a deal with Columbia Pictures to create an animated film and asked Gerald Potterton to oversee it.

The initial script had Arzach as the framing device for the film, but the script was thrown out after Jean Giraud refused to allow the usage of his characters. Len Blum and Daniel Goldberg created Taarna and a green orb instead. Chris Achilléos did the character design for Taarna.

Michael Mills was hired to create the opening and closing segments, but script rewrites had the sequences redrawn multiple times. Reitman, displeased with the high expenses, withheld payment. Mills sued and the case was settled out of court. Reitman hired Jimmy T. Murakami to create a new opening.

Atkinson Film-Arts animated Harry Canyon, directed by Pino van Lamsweerde, and the B-17 segment by Barrie Nelson. Captain Sternn was animated by Boxcar films under the direction of Paul Sebella and Julian Szuchopa. Halas and Batchelor and TVC animated the other segments. Taarna was created in Montreal by 11 designers, 30 animators, and 54 assistants under the direction of John Bruno. José Abel, Danny Antonucci, and Zdenko Gašparović worked on Taarna.

Animator Robert Balser directed the animation of the "Den" sequence for the film. The film uses the rotoscoping technique of animation in several shots. This process consists of shooting models and actors, then tracing the shot onto film. There is also a short shot of the Pentagon in "So Beautiful & So Dangerous" that contains CGI.

== Release ==
The film was released on August 7, 1981. It was a financial success, grossing over $20 million on a $9 million budget (equivalent to a gross of $71 million in 2025).

== Reception ==
The film was met with mixed response. Review aggregator Rotten Tomatoes reports that 66% of critics have given the film a positive review based on 35 reviews, with an average rating of 5.8/10 and the critical consensus: "It's sexist, juvenile, and dated, but Heavy Metal makes up for its flaws with eye-popping animation and a classic, smartly-used soundtrack." Metacritic, which uses a weighted average, assigned the film a score of 51 out of 100, based on 13 critics, indicating "mixed or average" reviews.

Janet Maslin of The New York Times wrote that "for anyone who doesn't think an hour and a half is a long time to spend with a comic book, Heavy Metal is impressive", and noted that the film "was scored very well, with music much less ear-splitting than the title would suggest." Variety declared, "Initial segments have a boisterous blend of dynamic graphics, intriguing plot premises and sly wit that unfortunately slide gradually downhill ... Still, the net effect is an overridingly positive one and will likely find its way into upbeat word-of-mouth." Gene Siskel of the Chicago Tribune gave the film three stars, writing that it "isn't intended for close scrutiny on a literal level. The film clearly is intended as a trip, and on that level it works very nicely." He criticized the film as "blatantly sexist" and for having "wildly romanticized" violence. Sheila Benson of the Los Angeles Times wrote, "Somehow a great deal of the charm [of the magazine] leaked out on the way to the movie house, but all of the sadism stayed put. And then some. It's the most expensive adolescent fantasy revenge fulfillment wet dream ever to slither onto a screen." John Pym of the Monthly Film Bulletin found that it was "to put it mildly, something of a hodge-podge." Film historian and critic Leonard Maltin gave the film 3 stars out of 4 in his Movie Guide, calling the feature "... uneven, but great fun on a mindless, adolescent level."

On the whole, in terms of individual segments, critics were typically most favorable towards the "Den" story. Maslin of the Times gave the segment a positive review, writing, "The other highly memorable story is about a bookworm from earth who winds up on another planet, where his spindly body is transformed into that of an extraterrestrial Hercules." She also complimented John Candy's vocal performance as Den.

Christopher John reviewed Heavy Metal in Ares #11 and commented that "Sadly, what could have been a true boost for animation in this country (Note: Referring to the United States, not Canada.) is a weak, opportunistic failure, put together with very little care and no love at all."

C. J. Henderson reviewed Heavy Metal for Pegasus magazine and stated that "Heavy Metal was a box office and an artistic failure because its makers underestimated the taste of their audience. The memory of animated feature makers such as Disney and the Fliecher Brothers are not so far removed that people will accept dregs the likes of which they receive from folks such as Ralph Bakshi or the crew in charge of Heavy Metal. This film will, hopefully, encourage more animated efforts. Its mistakes will, hopefully, encourage better ones."

== Home media ==
In 1991, after selling Tundra Publishing to Kitchen Sink Press, Kevin Eastman bought Heavy Metal magazine and formally adopted the role of owner, publisher, and editor-in-chief of the magazine. Upon taking on the role, one of Eastman's first tasks was extracting the 1981 adult animated Heavy Metal anthology film from legal limbo and get it re-released as the original producers' shortsightedness during the advent of home video, believing it would be a passing fad, saw music licensing for the film's soundtrack unsecured and proved to be so much of a legal headache that Columbia TriStar decided not to bother with a home video release. While the film couldn't be released on home video, it was aired frequently on HBO and Cinemax throughout the 1980s and 1990s and was often bootlegged by fans. Eastman spent five years and a significant amount of his own money to help untangle the music licensing conflicts and allow the film to be re-released including lobbying executives at Columbia Pictures who reluctantly agreed to help re-release the movie just to stop receiving phone calls and visits from Eastman. The film was re-released to 54 theaters on March 8, 1996 followed by an official release on VHS and LaserDisc on June 4, 1996. This release includes restored footage of the three-minute sequence titled "Neverwhere Land" by animator Cornelius Cole III, which was originally cut from the film for pacing reasons. The re-release of Heavy Metal on home video proved to be a major hit selling over two million copies. Because of the success of the film on home video this led to Columbia offering to collaborate on a follow-up film with Eastman.

Prior to official release on VHS and LaserDisc in 1996, the film was re-released to 54 theatres on March 8, 1996, remixed in Sony's 8-track SDDS audio system, taking in US$550,000 (equivalent to $1,129,058 in 2025). The subsequent home video release, the first animated film issued on the VHS format to be THX-certified, moved over one million units.

The film was released on Blu-ray Disc on February 1, 2011 as a Best Buy exclusive and it was later released everywhere on June 14, 2011.

A remastered 4K version was released on Ultra HD Blu-ray on April 19, 2022, bundled with a Blu-ray Disc release of the sequel, Heavy Metal 2000 (2000).

== Music ==
=== Soundtrack ===
Heavy Metal: Music from the Motion Picture

Soundtrack album by various artists
- Released: July 1981
- Genres: Heavy metal; hard rock
- Label: Full Moon/Asylum/Epic

Heavy Metal (film) soundtracks chronology
Heavy Metal: Music from the Motion Picture (1981)	Heavy Metal 2000 OST (2000)

Singles from Heavy Metal: Music from the Motion Picture
- 1. "Heavy Metal (Takin' a Ride)" Released: July 1981; 2. "Reach Out" Released: August 1981; 3. "Working in the Coal Mine" Released: August 17, 1981; 4. "Heavy Metal (original version)" Released: September 1981; 5. "True Companion / All of You" Released: November 1981; 6. "Open Arms" Released: January 8, 1982

Professional ratings
Review scores
Source	Rating
AllMusic	4.5 stars

The soundtrack was released on LP in 1981; for legal reasons, it was not released on CD until 1995. The album peaked at number 12 on the Billboard 200 chart. The film's theme song, "Heavy Metal (Takin' a Ride)" was sung by Don Felder. It was released as a single in the U.S. and reached number 43 on the Billboard Hot 100 and number five on the Mainstream Rock chart on September 19, 1981.

Blue Öyster Cult wrote and recorded a song called "Vengeance (The Pact)" for the film. However, the producers declined to use the song because the lyrics provided a capsulized summary of the "Taarna" vignette. "Veteran of the Psychic Wars" was used instead. Both songs can be found on Blue Öyster Cult's album Fire of Unknown Origin. Although used in the film, the songs "Through Being Cool" by Devo and "E5150" by Black Sabbath were not included in the released soundtrack album. These songs are on New Traditionalists and Mob Rules, respectively.

The legal difficulties surrounding the use of some songs in the film delayed its release to home media. The production company's use of some songs was limited solely to the theatrical release and soundtrack and did not include home media releases. It was not until 1996 that there was an official home media release on VHS when Kevin Eastman, who had bought the publishing rights of Heavy Metal magazine in 1992 and previously contributed to the magazine, reached a settlement with the music copyright holders.

The original LP contained four tracks per side and was programmed in stackable order (A, D, B, C).

Rhino Records reissued the two-LP collection in 2017, programmed in standard order (A, B, C, D), as part of their "Rocktober" collection.

No.	Title	Artist	Length
1.	"Heavy Metal" (original version)	Sammy Hagar	3:50
2.	"Heartbeat"	Riggs	4:20
3.	"Working in the Coal Mine"	Devo	2:48
4.	"Veteran of the Psychic Wars"	Blue Öyster Cult	4:48
5.	"Reach Out"	Cheap Trick	3:35
6.	"Heavy Metal (Takin' a Ride)"	Don Felder	5:00
7.	"True Companion"	Donald Fagen	5:02
8.	"Crazy (A Suitable Case for Treatment)"	Nazareth	3:24
9.	"Radar Rider"	Riggs	2:40
10.	"Open Arms"	Journey	3:20
11.	"Queen Bee"	Grand Funk Railroad	3:11
12.	"I Must Be Dreamin'"	Cheap Trick	5:37
13.	"The Mob Rules" (alternate version)	Black Sabbath	3:16
14.	"All of You"	Don Felder	4:18
15.	"Prefabricated"	Trust	2:59
16.	"Blue Lamp"	Stevie Nicks	3:48

==== Charts ====
Chart (1981–1982)	Peak position
Canada Top Albums/CDs (RPM)	8
US Billboard 200	12

==== Certifications ====
Region	Certification	Certified units/sales
Canada (Music Canada)	Platinum	100,000^{^}
United States (RIAA)	Platinum	1,000,000^{^}
^{^} Shipments figures based on certification alone.

=== Score ===
Unusual for the time, an LP recording of Elmer Bernstein's score was released alongside the soundtrack in 1981, and it featured the composer's first use of the ondes Martenot, an instrument which became a trademark of Bernstein's later career. On March 13, 2008, Film Score Monthly released an official, expanded CD release of Bernstein's score, which he conducted. The score was performed by the Royal Philharmonic Orchestra with the London Voices and Jeanne Loriod on the ondes Martenot.

Original track listing:

1. "Den and the Green Ball" (03:17)
2. "Den Makes It" (02:49)
3. "Den and the Queen" (02:56)
4. "Den's Heroics" (02:52)
5. "Bomber and the Green Ball" (04:41)
6. "Space Love" (01:32)
7. "Harry and the Girl" (03:45)
8. "Tarna Summoned" (sic) (02:50)
9. "Flight" (02:20)
10. "Tarna Prepares" (sic) (03:35)
11. "Barbarians" (03:37)
12. "Tarna Forever" (sic) (03:37)

Re-release track listing:

1. "Beginning" 1:16
2. "Intro to Green Ball" 1:18
3. "Discovery/Transformation (Den and the Green Ball)" 3:15
4. "Den Makes Out (Den Makes It)" 2:42
5. "Castrate Him/Searching for the Loc-Nar" 2:04
6. "Queen for a Day (Den and the Queen)" 2:54
7. "Pursuit (Den’s Heroics)" 2:51
8. "Fiste" 1:27
9. "Getting Bombed" 3:06
10. "Green Ball" 2:15
11. "Dem Bones" 2:44
12. "No Alarm" 0:58
13. "Robot Love (Space Love)" 1:32
14. "Harry" 1:35
15. "The Next Morning" 1:56
16. "End of Baby" 2:43
17. "Council (Taarna Summoned)" 2:49
18. "The Flight to Temple (Flight)" 2:16
19. "The Sword (Taarna Prepares)" 3:32
20. "Flight to Holiday Town" 2:20
21. "Fighting" 2:43
22. "My Whips!/Taarna Escapes Pit" 4:57
23. "Finish (Taarna Forever)" 3:34

Bonus tracks

1. "Den Makes Out" (film version) 2:49
2. "Bomber and the Green Ball" (album edit) 4:35
3. "Harry and the Girl" (album edit) 3:41
4. "Barbarians" (album edit) 3:34

== Sequel ==
The sequel, titled Heavy Metal 2000, was released in 2000. Upon its release, Heavy Metal 2000 received negative reviews from critics.

== Legacy and cultural impact ==
Several years after the film's release, Heavy Metal managed to achieve a strong cult following mainly through midnight screenings, TV showings, and home video releases.

The film served as inspiration for many animation and science-fiction films and shows following it, including Sausage Party (2016), and The Spine of Night (2021).

The film was parodied in a season 12 episode of the adult animated comedy series South Park entitled "Major Boobage" (2008; S12E03), which also featured songs from the film's soundtrack.

In 2018 Elon Musk launched a Tesla Roadster into orbit with an astronaut mannequin in the driver's seat and cameras mounted to capture the driver's side and front views. News reports noted the imitation of Heavy Metal's "Soft Landing" segment.

Both Heavy Metal and the British animated film Watership Down (1978) served as strong influences on the animation and anthology styles of the music video "At the Door" by The Strokes.

== Remake ==
In March 2008, Variety reported that Paramount Pictures was set to make another animated film with David Fincher "spearheading the project". Kevin Eastman, who was at the time the owner and publisher of Heavy Metal, was to direct a segment, as would Tim Miller, "whose Blur Studio will handle the animation for what is being conceived as an R-rated, adult-themed feature".

Entertainment website IGN announced, on July 14, 2008, "David Fincher's edgy new project has suffered a serious setback after it was dropped by Paramount, according to Entertainment Weekly." Entertainment Weekly quoted Tim Miller as saying "David really believes in the project. It's just a matter of time."

In September 2008, Eastman was quoted as saying "Fincher is directing one, Guillermo del Toro wants to direct one, Zack Snyder wants to direct one, Gore Verbinski wants to direct one". It was reported that the film had been moved to Sony division Columbia Pictures (which had released the original) and had a budget of $50 million.

In June 2009, Eastman said that Fincher and James Cameron were going to be co-executive producers on the film, with Cameron directing one segment. Mark Osborne and Jack Black from Tenacious D were going to do a comedy segment for the film.

Production was stalled, as no studio was willing to fund the project, and Paramount Pictures purportedly thought a reboot of this film was "too risqué for mainstream audiences".

In July 2011, filmmaker Robert Rodriguez announced at San Diego Comic-Con that he had purchased the film rights to Heavy Metal and planned to develop a new animated film at the new Quick Draw Studios. On March 11, 2014, with the formation of his own television network, El Rey, Rodriguez considered switching gears and bringing it to TV.

On March 15, 2019, the reboot was released on Netflix as an original property titled Love, Death & Robots.

== See also ==
- List of cult films
- Rock & Rule, another Canadian animated movie featuring a soundtrack with various rock and metal artists.

== Works cited ==
- Mazurkewich, Karen (1999). Cartoon Capers: The History of Canadian Animators. McArthur & Company Publishing. ISBN 1-55278-093-7.
