= Reach Out (Cheap Trick song) =

Single by Cheap Trick

from the album Heavy Metal: Music from the Motion Picture
- B-side: "I Must Be Dreamin'"
- Released: August 1981
- Genre: Rock, power pop
- Length: 3:35
- Label: Full Moon Records; Asylum Records
- Songwriters: Bob James; Pete Comita
- Producer: Roy Thomas Baker

Cheap Trick singles chronology
| "World's Greatest Lover" (1981) | "Reach Out" (1981) | "If You Want My Love" (1982) |

"Reach Out" is a song by American rock band Cheap Trick, released in 1981 as a single from the soundtrack of the 1981 film Heavy Metal. It was written by Bob James and Pete Comita, and produced by Roy Thomas Baker. Although the film's soundtrack album reached No. 12 on the Billboard 200, "Reach Out" was not a commercial success and failed to make a chart appearance.

The single is the only release from Cheap Trick to feature Pete Comita as bassist. Comita had replaced original bassist Tom Petersson in 1980; however, Comita would also leave the band a year later, following the completion of the 1980-81 World Tour to promote All Shook Up.

Speaking to Ultimate Guitar in 2009, Cheap Trick guitarist Rick Nielsen said of the song: "[Comita] wrote that song with a guy named Bob James. He originally told us he had written it, but we later found out, he didn't write it [alone]."

== Release ==
"Reach Out" was released before the soundtrack album. At the time, Billboard reported that some of the soundtrack would be released as singles on the artists' own label and others on Full Moon/Asylum. Walter Yetnikoff, president of CBS Records at the time, allowed Irving Azoff and Full Moon to release "Reach Out". Azoff told Billboard: "We're putting out the Cheap Trick cut on Full Moon. Walter said "You can release it; obviously you guys would work it harder than we would because we don't have a Cheap Trick album to sell right now."

The single was released on 7" vinyl in the US only by Full Moon and Asylum Records. The B-side, "I Must Be Dreamin'", was also featured on the Heavy Metal soundtrack. It was written solely by Nielsen and also produced by Baker.

== Critical reception ==
Upon release, The Milwaukee Journal commented: "...but the real treat of the LP is one of the two Cheap Trick cuts, "Reach Out," penned, in part, by the group's new bass player as of a year ago, Pete Comita. Cheap Trick hasn't done anything this good in a long time." Record World called it a "throbbing rocker [that] spotlights Robin Zander's vocal hysteria and Rick Nielsen's kamikaze guitar runs." Bret Adams of AllMusic spoke of the song in a review of the Heavy Metal soundtrack, noting "Cheap Trick's "Reach Out" and "I Must Be Dreamin'" rely more on synthesizers than power-pop guitars."

In 2016, Rolling Stone included the song in their list "10 Insanely Great Cheap Trick Songs Only Hardcore Fans Know". Author Tom Beaujour described the song as a "soundtrack gem", adding: "The song's introductory buzzing synth riff and outro motif are very much the products of a bygone era, but drummer Bun E. Carlos infuses "Reach Out" with a post–Ringo Starr swing that is truly timeless."

== Track listing ==
7" single

1. "Reach Out" - 3:35
2. "I Must Be Dreamin'" - 3:17

7" single (US promo)

1. "Reach Out" - 3:35
2. "Reach Out" - 3:35

== Personnel ==
Cheap Trick

- Robin Zander - lead and backing vocals, rhythm guitar
- Rick Nielsen - lead guitar, keyboards
- Pete Comita - bass guitar
- Bun E. Carlos - drums, percussion

Additional personnel

- Roy Thomas Baker - producer
- Ian Taylor - engineer
- Bernie Grundman - mastering
- Irving Azoff - executive producer
- Chris Achilleos - front cover illustration
