= Heavy Metal (Takin' a Ride) =

Song by Don Felder

Single by Don Felder

from the album Heavy Metal: Music from the Motion Picture
- B-side: "All of You"
- Released: July 1981
- Genre: Hard rock
- Length: 4:58
- Label: Asylum
- Songwriter: Don Felder
- Producer: Don Felder

"Heavy Metal (Takin' a Ride)" is a song by Eagles guitarist Don Felder with lead vocals sung by Felder and backing vocals sung by Timothy B. Schmit and Don Henley. It is the theme song of the animated film Heavy Metal, not to be confused with the song of the same title by Sammy Hagar, also included on the same movie soundtrack. The B-side, "All of You", is also a track on the film's soundtrack album.

"Heavy Metal" was Felder's only solo hit. The song charted in the United States, reaching No. 43 on the Billboard Hot 100 and number 42 on Cash Box. It spent four months on the pop charts. On the Mainstream Rock chart, "Heavy Metal (Takin' a Ride)" peaked at number five.

== Personnel ==
- Don Felder - vocals, guitar
- Timothy B. Schmit - bass, backing vocals
- Don Henley - drums, backing vocals

== Chart history ==
Chart (1981)	Peak position
US Billboard Hot 100	43
US Billboard Top Tracks	5
US Cash Box Top 100	42
