= Behind Enemy Lines (book) =

Autobiographical book co-written by Holocaust survivor Marthe Cohn and Wendy Holden

- Author: Marthe Cohn, Wendy Holden
- Subject: Biography, World War II
- Genre: Personal narratives
- Set in: Metz, France
- Published: New York
- Publisher: Harmony Books
- Publication date: 2002
- Pages: x, 282 pages
- ISBN: 0609610546
- OCLC: 50272414
- LC Class: DS135.F9 C643 2002

Behind Enemy Lines is a 2002 autobiographical book co-written by Holocaust survivor Marthe Cohn and Wendy Holden. It details Cohn's exploits as a French Jew during the Holocaust and World War II when, working as a nurse, she traveled into German territory to collect intelligence for the French Army, as the Allied forces started making advances on Germany, pushing the German forces back during World War II
