= Marthe Cohn =

French espionage agent (1920–2025)

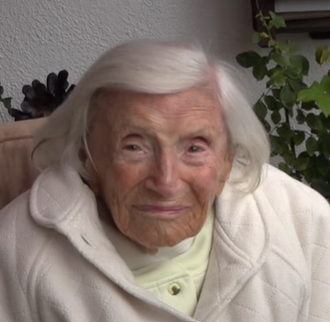
- Cohn in April 2025
- Born: Marthe Hoffnung; 13 April 1920; Metz, France
- Died: 20 May 2025 (aged 105); Rancho Palos Verdes, California, U.S.
- Occupations: Nurse; author
- Spouse: Major L. Cohn (m. 1958)
- Children: 2
- Awards: Legion of Honour

Marthe Hoffnung Cohn (13 April 1920 – 20 May 2025) was a French nurse, spy, Holocaust survivor and author. She wrote about her experiences as a spy at the end of World War II in the book Behind Enemy Lines (2002).

== Life ==
Marthe Hoffnung was born in Metz on 13 April 1920, into an Orthodox Jewish family, the fifth of eight children of Fischel Hoffnung and his wife Regine. Metz had been a German possession from 1871 to 1918, acquired as part of Alsace-Lorraine in the Franco-Prussian War and relinquished after World War I. Her grandfather was a rabbi who instilled the love of books, and her father ran a small photo-finishing shop. Her parents spoke only German. She witnessed antisemitism near home with the defacement of the Synagogue of Metz. Once, teenagers stoned her family as they left synagogue services, and she watched her father chase them, wielding his belt.

=== World War II ===
After the start of World War II in September 1939, Cohn's family moved from the border with Germany to Poitiers, where they stayed after the 1940 German invasion of France. Initially French Jews in the area faced relatively few restrictions after annexation of the Moselle by the Nazis in July 1940, but the situation gradually deteriorated. Cohn began to study at a nursing school in Poitiers.

In the summer of 1942, using false papers, Cohn organized her family's escape from Poitiers to the free zone; at the time, her sister Stéphanie, a student of medicine, had been arrested by the Gestapo because she had helped a student to escape. The non-Jewish colleague who provided the false papers had worked with Cohn as a translator at the Poitiers city hall; he broke down in tears when she asked his price, and responded that he was trying to save her, not make money. As she escaped with her mother and grandmother, she feared that local residents would turn them in for a reward; instead, a local peasant and his wife stared at them, knelt in the dirt, prayed and made the sign of the cross, a moment Cohn later described as "so beautiful, the humanity of it".

Cohn's fiancé, Jacques Delaunay, a student she had met at Poitiers, was imprisoned by the Nazis in October 1943 as an activist in the French Resistance. In November 1943, she finished her studies at the nursing school of the French Red Cross in Marseille. She then lived in Paris with a sister.

In November 1944, after the liberation of Paris and after learning that her fiancé had been executed, she enlisted and became a member of the Intelligence Service of the French Army. After 14 unsuccessful attempts to cross the front in Alsace, she crossed the border into Germany near Schaffhausen in Switzerland. As a nurse fluent in German, she assumed the identity of a German nurse and claimed she was searching for her missing fiancé. She crawled back across the Swiss border to relay the information back to the French intelligence. She was able to report two major pieces of information: that northwest of Freiburg, the Siegfried Line had been evacuated and where the remnant of the Wehrmacht lay in ambush in the Black Forest.

=== After the War ===
After the war, Cohn returned to France to pursue a career as a nurse. She studied further in Geneva, where she met an American medical student in 1956, Major L. Cohn, who was the roommate of a friend. Within three years, they were married and lived in the United States from 1956. They worked together for years, he as an anesthesiologist and she as a nurse anesthetist. They had two sons. She did not tell him about her spy history until after they married.

Cohn was decorated with the Croix de Guerre in 1945 with two citations (Decisions Number 134 signed by Le Lieutenant-Colonel Bouvet on 9 August 1945 & Number 1322 signed by Marechal Juin on 10 November 1945). In 1999, the French government awarded her the Médaille militaire, Decree Number 3465 MR 1999. She was awarded the title of Knight of the Legion of Honour (Decree Number 2702, MR 2004) by André Bord, the national veterans minister in 2002. In 2006, she was again honored by the Government of France with the Medaille of the Reconnaissance de la Nation.

In 2002, she co-authored with Wendy Holden a book about her experiences entitled Behind Enemy Lines: the True Story of a French Jewish Spy in Nazi Germany, that was published by Harmony Books. Cohn had not previously spoken publicly about her secret assignments during the war, largely because she thought no one would believe her. Standing 4 feet 11 inches tall, she commented that spies were "usually tall and good-looking", making her "a very unlikely spy".

Cohn's last residence was in Palos Verdes, California.

She died in Rancho Palos Verdes on 21 May 2025, at the age of 105.

== Awards and honours ==
- Croix de Guerre, 1945
- Médaille militaire, 1999
- Legion of Honour, Knight 2002
- Woman of Valor, Simon Wiesenthal Center
- Medal of the Nation's Gratitude, France, 2006
- Order of Merit of the Federal Republic of Germany

== Film ==
A 2019 film was produced as a documentary of Cohn's life by writer-director Nicola Alice Hens and producer Amos Geva, entitled Chichinette: The Accidental Spy. The nickname "Chichinette", or 'pain in the neck', referred to her keen and inquisitive nature. In the film, asked for a message to viewers, she said: "Be engaged. And don’t accept any order that your conscience could not approve."

== Books ==
- Behind Enemy Lines: The True Story of a French Jewish Spy in Nazi Germany. Harmony Books. 2002. ISBN 978-0-609-61054-1.
- Derrière les lignes ennemies : Une espionne juive dans l'Allemagne nazie. Editions Tallandier. 2009. ISBN 978-2-84734-614-5.
