= Heaven and Hell: My Life in the Eagles (1974–2001) =

Book by Don Felder

- Front cover of the book
- Author: Don Felder with Wendy Holden
- Cover artist: Phil Rose, Michael Ochs and Will Ryan
- Language: English
- Genre: Autobiography
- Publisher: Weidenfeld and Nicolson
- Publication date: 2007
- Publication place: United States
- Media type: Print (hardback)
- Pages: 340
- ISBN: 978-0-470-28906-8
- Dewey Decimal: 782.42166092 B 22
- LC Class: ML420.F3334 A3 2008

Heaven and Hell: My Life in the Eagles (1974–2001) is an autobiography written by former Eagles guitarist Don Felder with Wendy Holden. The book follows Felder from his less-privileged childhood through to the 21st century. It gained notoriety for expressing Felder's frank feelings regarding Eagles bandmates Don Henley and Glenn Frey, whom he derisively refers to as "The Gods" a number of times in the manuscript. Felder also discusses his split with the Eagles and how he was treated by former friend Joe Walsh, and claims he has not spoken to Walsh since his termination.

The book is the first autobiography from any member of the Eagles. The book contains several personal photos of Felder as a child and performing with various bands.

Henley has since spoken out and insists that Felder is only bitter because he got kicked out and decided to write the tell-all, which he dismisses as a "low cheap shot". He has accused Felder of being unfair to him and Frey in the book and says that a lot of people believe the "bullshit" in the book and believe that he and Frey are tyrants. He denies this and says that the pair were responsible for the band's longevity and success, because they did it "their way".

However the autobiography provides many specific references to circumstances and band interactions during Felder's tenure in the Eagles, as well as the context of known events such as specific concert dates and album releases.
