= Road to Forever =

Studio album by Don Felder
- Released: 2012
- Recorded: 2012
- Genre: Rock
- Label: Top Ten, Inc.
- Producer: Don Felder, Robin DiMaggio

Don Felder chronology
Airborne (1983)	Road to Forever (2012)	American Rock 'n' Roll (2019)

Professional ratings
Review scores
Source	Rating
Allmusic	3.5/5 stars

Road to Forever is the second solo studio album by Don Felder, the first since 1983. It was released on October 8, 2012.

Contributors to the album include Randy Jackson, Crosby, Stills and Nash, Steve Lukather, David Paich and Steve Porcaro of Toto, and Tommy Shaw of Styx. It was produced by Felder along with Robin DiMaggio.

The album was conceived and written out of the pain Felder felt following the breakup of his marriage in 2000, and his dismissal from the Eagles soon after.

On December 17, 2013, the album was reissued as "Road to Forever - Extended Edition" on digital platforms. It compiled all four bonus tracks from previous editions of the album and places them before album track "Give My Life". The single "You Don't Have Me" made it to #1 and stayed in the top ten for 11 weeks on the Classic Rock Radio charts and the previous single "Wash Away" reached #4.

== Track listing ==
1. "Fall from the Grace of Love" - 3:47
2. "Girls in Black" - 3:39
3. "Wash Away" - 4:18
4. I Believe in You" - 3:58
5. "You Don't Have Me" - 3:47
6. "Money" - 4:11
7. "Someday" - 4:13
8. "Heal Me" - 7:23
9. "Over You" - 4:09
10. "Road to Forever" - 4:59
11. "Life's Lullaby" - 4:21
12. "Give My Life" - 4:04

Japanese bonus tracks

1. "Southern Bound" - 3:57
2. "Can't Stop Now" - 4:25

iTunes bonus track

1. "Sensuality" - 3:47

Amazon bonus track

1. "She Runs Free" - 4:01

== Personnel ==
Production

- Don Felder – producer
- Robin DiMaggio – producer
- Ed Cherney – engineer, mixing
- Steven Miller – additional engineer
- Mikal Blue – recording engineer
- Mark Needham – recording engineer
- Will Briere – second engineer
- Brian Porizek – art direction, design
- Michael Helms – photography
- Myriam Santos – photography
- Charlie Brusco and Red Light Management – management

Musicians

- Don Felder – lead vocals, backing vocals, guitars
- Alex Allesandroni – keyboards
- Michael Bearden – keyboards
- Robin DiMaggio – acoustic piano, keyboard programming, drums, percussion
- Timothy Drury – acoustic piano, string arrangements, backing vocals, keyboards (12)
- Mike Finnigan – Hammond B3 organ
- David Paich – acoustic piano, Rhodes electric piano, Hammond organ
- Steve Porcaro – keyboards
- Greg Leisz – pedal steel guitar
- Vincent Nguini – guitar (8), backing vocals (8)
- Steve Lukather – guitar (10)
- Chris Chaney – bass
- Leland Sklar – bass
- Randy Jackson – bass (7)
- Bahkiti Kumalo – bass (8), backing vocals (8)
- Lenny Castro – percussion
- Bill Churchville – trombone (13), trumpet (13)
- Charlotte Gibson – backing vocals
- David Crosby – backing vocals (1)
- Graham Nash – backing vocals (1)
- Stephen Stills – backing vocals (1)
- Tommy Shaw – backing vocals (3, 8)
- Shane August – backing vocals (6, 10)
- Sean Holt – backing vocals (6, 8), trombone (13), trumpet (13)
- Leah Felder – backing vocals (10)
