= Airborne (Don Felder album) =

Studio album by Don Felder
- Released: October 31, 1983
- Recorded: 1983
- Studios: Radical Studios (Malibu, California); Rumbo Recorders (Los Angeles, California); Devonshire Sound Studios (North Hollywood, California)
- Genre: Rock
- Length: 37:22
- Label: Asylum
- Producer: Don Felder

Don Felder chronology
Airborne (1983)	Road to Forever (2012)

Professional ratings
Review scores
Source	Rating
AllMusic	3.5/5 stars

Airborne is the debut solo studio album by former Eagles guitarist Don Felder recorded during the period that the band was broken up. It was his only solo album until 2012's Road to Forever. It featured Carlos Vega, Joe Vitale, Russ Kunkel, Tris Imboden, Timothy B. Schmit, Jeff Lorber, Paulinho da Costa, Joe Lala, Kenny Loggins, Dave Mason and Albhy Galuten.

Felder's surname on the album cover stylized similar to the Fender Musical Instruments Corporation logo, showing the similarity of spelling and Don Felder's affinity for electric guitars manufactured by Fender.

"Bad Girls" went to #34 on the Billboard Mainstream Rock Charts and peaked at #104 on the Bubbling Under Hot 100.

== Track listing ==
All tracks by Don Felder unless otherwise noted:

Side One

1. "Bad Girls" – 4:48
2. "Winners" – 4:39
3. "Haywire" – 5:09
4. "Who Tonight" – 4:57

Side Two

1. "Never Surrender" (Felder, Kenny Loggins) – 4:17
2. "Asphalt Jungle" – 4:11
3. "Night Owl" (Felder, George "Chocolate" Perry, Joe Vitale) – 4:33
4. "Still Alive" – 4:48

== Personnel ==
- Don Felder – vocals, guitars, synthesizers (2–7), keyboards (5)
- Anthony Marinelli – Synclavier (1, 8)
- Jeff Lorber – keyboards (2, 3)
- Albhy Galuten – Synclavier (4, 6)
- Michael Murphy – keyboards (7)
- Nathan East – bass (1, 8)
- George "Chocolate" Perry – bass (3, 4, 6, 7)
- George Hawkins – bass (5)
- Carlos Vega – drums (1)
- Tris Imboden – drums (2, 5, 8)
- Joe Vitale – drums (3, 6, 7), keyboards (4), percussion (4), flute (4)
- Russ Kunkel – drums (4)
- Joe Lala – percussion (3, 5)
- Paulinho da Costa – percussion (4, 6)
- James Pankow – horns (5)
- Lee Loughnane – horns (5)
- Johnny Mandel – string and synthesizer arrangements (8)
- Timothy B. Schmit – backing vocals (2–4, 7)
- Kenny Loggins – backing vocals (5)
- Dave Mason – backing vocals (5)

=== Production ===
- Don Felder – producer, engineer
- Doug Breidenbach – engineer
- Greg Edward – engineer
- Steve Gursky – engineer
- Joel Moss – engineer
- Jim Nipar – engineer, remixing (5)
- Karl Richardson – engineer
- The Mastering Lab (Hollywood, California) – mastering location
- Jeff Adamoff – art direction, design
- Jim Shea – photography
- Front Line Management – direction
