= Don Felder =

American musician (b. 1947)

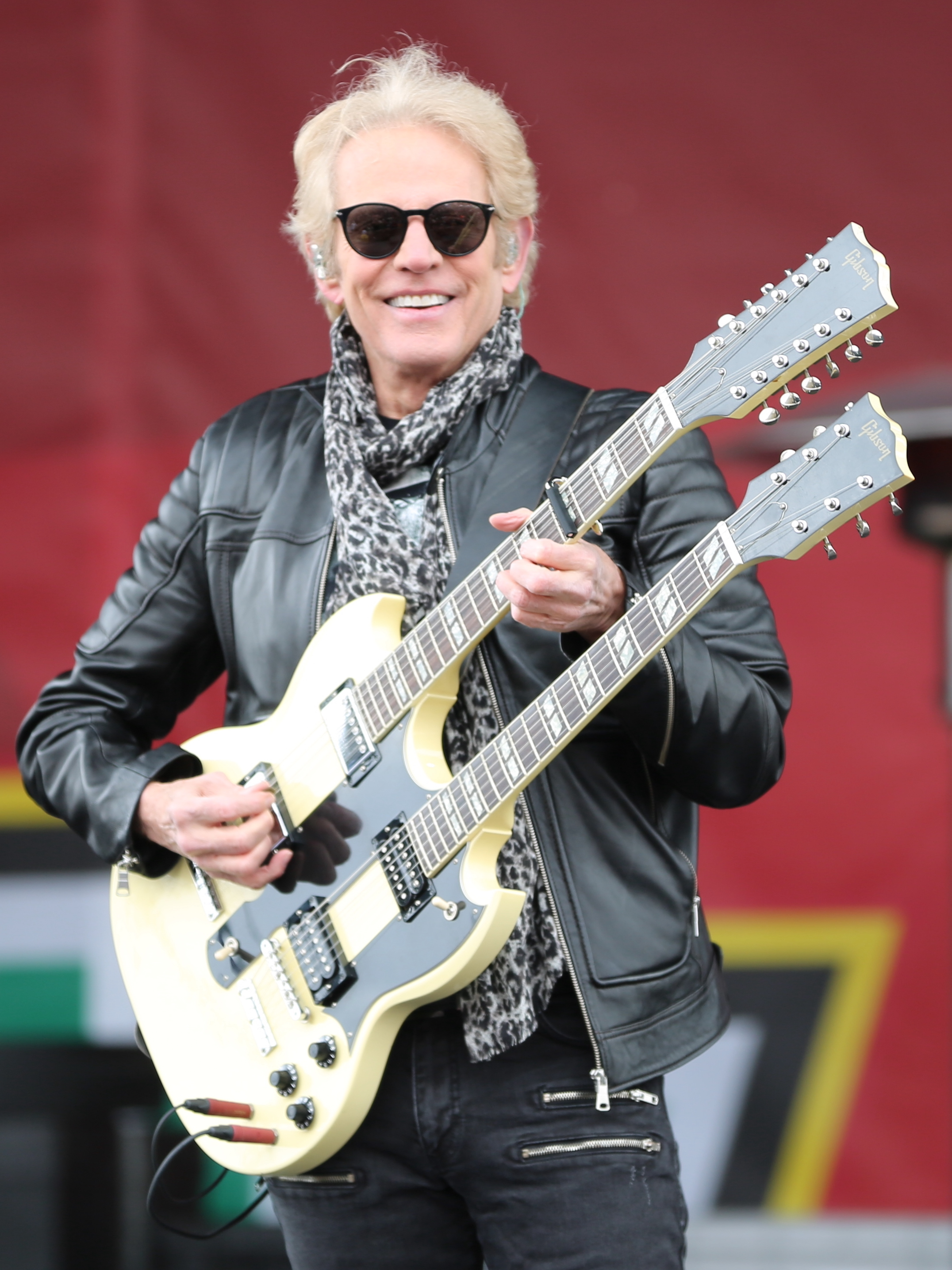
- Felder in 2023

Background information
- Born: Donald William Felder; September 21, 1947 (age 79); Gainesville, Florida, U.S.
- Genres: Hard rock; blues rock; country rock; funk rock; soft rock
- Occupation: Musician
- Instruments: Guitar; vocals
- Years active: 1960–present
- Website: donfelder.com

Donald William Felder (born September 21, 1947) is an American musician who was the lead guitarist of the rock band Eagles from 1974 to 2001. He is known for co-writing several of the band's songs, most notably "Hotel California". Felder was inducted into the Rock and Roll Hall of Fame in 1998 with Eagles and was inducted into the Musicians Hall of Fame and Museum in 2016.

Felder was fired from Eagles in 2001 after which he filed lawsuits against his former bandmates alleging wrongful termination, breach of implied-in-fact contract and breach of fiduciary duty. In 2008, he published Heaven and Hell: My Life in the Eagles (1974–2001), an autobiography detailing his tenure with Eagles.

== Early life ==
Don Felder was born in Gainesville, Florida, on September 21, 1947. He was raised in a Southern Baptist family.

Felder was first attracted to music after watching Elvis Presley live on The Ed Sullivan Show. He acquired his first guitar when he was about ten years old, which he has stated he exchanged with a friend at the five-and-dime for a handful of cherry bombs. A self-taught musician, he was heavily influenced by rock and roll. At the age of 13 he started his first band, the Continentals in 1960, which also included Stephen Stills and Isaac Guillory.

Felder's family could not afford music lessons, so he taught himself to play guitar by ear, by listening to tape recordings that he played back at half-speed. He worked at a music store started by a Berklee graduate, who taught music theory and some notation to Felder during his employment there.

== Career ==
=== Early bands ===
Around that time, he met Bernie Leadon, who later became one of the founding members of the Eagles. Leadon replaced Stephen Stills in the Continentals, which eventually changed its name to the Maundy Quintet. Felder and Leadon both attended Gainesville High School. Felder gave guitar lessons at a local music shop for about 18 months, at which time he also learned how to play slide guitar from Duane Allman. Although Felder claimed that he taught a young Tom Petty how to play the guitar, Petty said that he was never taught the guitar by Felder, clarifying that Felder instead taught him how to play piano.

The Maundy Quintet recorded and released a 45-rpm single on the Tampa-based Paris Tower label in 1967, which received airplay in north-central Florida.

After the Maundy Quintet broke up, Felder went to Manhattan, New York City, with a band called Flow, which released a self-titled improvisational rock fusion album in 1970. The 1970 Flow album has the distinction of being among the first issued on the newly independent CTI Records label, founded by jazz producer Creed Taylor. While in New York, Felder improved his mastery of improvisation on the guitar and learned various styles. After Flow broke up, Felder moved to Boston where he got a job in a recording studio.

In 1973, Felder moved to Los Angeles where he was hired as guitar player for a tour by David Blue, replacing David Lindley who was touring with Crosby & Nash. He helped Blue put together a tour, during which they opened at a few Crosby and Nash shows in November 1973 and for Neil Young at the opening of the Roxy Theatre. Once again, Felder replaced Lindley, this time in Crosby & Nash's band when Lindley fell ill. He would also jam from time to time with the Eagles in their rehearsal space.

In 1974, he featured on the Michael Dinner album The Great Pretender.

=== Eagles ===
In early January 1974, Felder was called by the Eagles to add slide guitar to their song "Good Day in Hell" and some guitar solos to "Already Gone". Shortly afterward, he was invited to join the band. Concurrently, the band began distancing themselves from their initial country rock style and moving more in the direction of full-fledged rock music. On the band's fourth album, One of These Nights, Felder sang lead vocal on the song "Visions" (the only song on which he was lead vocalist), which he co-wrote with Don Henley, and arranged the title track's distinctive guitar solo and bass line.

After founding member Bernie Leadon departed in 1975 following the tour to support the album, Joe Walsh joined the band. Felder had previously jammed with Walsh while Leadon was still a member of the Eagles, and together as dual guitar leads, they eventually became one of rock music's most memorable onstage partnerships. Felder also doubled on banjo, mandolin and pedal steel guitar on tours, all of which were previously handled by Leadon.

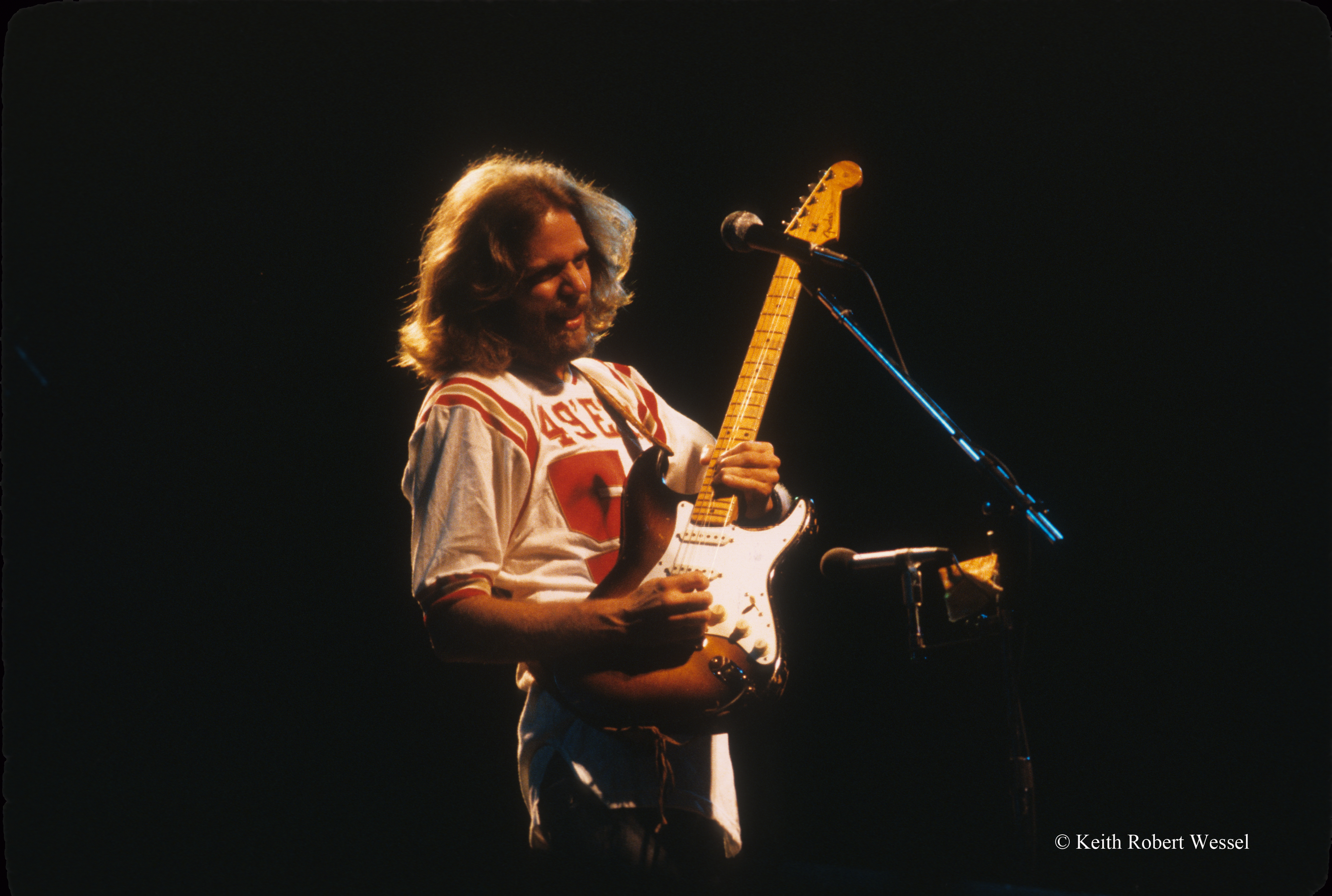
Felder in Milwaukee, Wisconsin

The first album that the Eagles released after the lineup change was Hotel California, which became a major international bestseller. Felder submitted "16 or 17 tracks" that resulted in the songs "Victim of Love" and the album's title track, "Hotel California". For the title track, after the arrangement and instrumentation had been refined, several complete takes were recorded. The best parts were then spliced together, in all 33 edits on the two‑inch master, to create the final version. In contrast, "Victim of Love" was recorded in a live session in studio, apart from the lead vocal and the harmony on the choruses which were added later. Felder initially sang the lead vocals in the many early takes of "Victim of Love", but the band felt that his efforts were not up to the required standard, and Henley then took over as lead vocalist. After the release of Hotel California and the tour that followed, the Eagles found themselves under tremendous pressure to repeat this success and tensions were made worse by alcohol, cocaine and other drugs. Bassist Randy Meisner left the band after the tour due to exhaustion and he was replaced by former Poco bassist Timothy B. Schmit, who had also replaced him in that band. Nevertheless, the fighting did not end with the addition of the mild-mannered Schmit, but it rather intensified during the recording of The Long Run, which took 18 months to complete, and Felder and Glenn Frey were especially hostile to one another, despite respecting each other's musical abilities.

According to Henley, Felder attempted to gain more control by co-opting Walsh so frequently that it was the pair up against himself and Frey when the band was dividing into factions and even Henley and Frey began to have their differences, thus causing the Eagles to disband.

At a concert in Long Beach, California, for Senator Alan Cranston on July 31, 1980, known as the "Long Night at Wrong Beach", things hit a breaking point in the band. The animosity between Felder and Frey boiled over before the show began, after Felder said "You're welcome – I guess" to Cranston and his wife, thus offending Frey. He angrily confronted Felder, and the pair began to threaten beatings throughout the show. Felder recalls Frey telling him during "Best of My Love", "I'm gonna kick your ass when we get off the stage." After the concert, Felder smashed, according to Frey, Felder's "cheapest guitar". "It was becoming the 'Glenn and Don Show' and they expected all of us to fall in line with their whims and wishes," said Felder. "I hate politics and had no desire to campaign for anybody, plus I never met Cranston before. Being in the band was no longer a fun experience." The Eagles disbanded shortly thereafter.

=== Post-1970s career ===
Following the 1980 disbandment of the Eagles, Felder focused more on his family, but also embarked on a solo career, concentrating on film composition and session work. He worked on the Bee Gees' 1981 album Living Eyes as a session guitarist. Through his association with Bee Gees producer Albhy Galuten, Felder made session appearances on albums by artists as diverse as Diana Ross, Barbra Streisand, and Andy Gibb. During this time, he also contributed guitar work to Stevie Nicks' first two solo albums, Bella Donna and The Wild Heart.

In 1983, Felder released his first solo album entitled Airborne. The album's single "Never Surrender", co-written with Kenny Loggins, was a minor hit, having also appeared on the soundtrack to the popular motion picture teen comedy Fast Times at Ridgemont High.

In 1985, Henley offered Felder $5,000 a week (US $14,968 in 2025 dollars) to go on tour with him, but Felder turned it down, citing both dissatisfaction with the pay and a desire to not go on tour.

Among his musical film credits in the 1980s are two songs on the soundtrack to the 1981 animated cult film Heavy Metal—titled "Heavy Metal (Takin' a Ride)" (with former bandmates Don Henley and Timothy B. Schmit contributing backing vocals) and "All of You", with Jefferson Starship's Mickey Thomas as backing vocalist—as well as the title track "Wild Life" from the 1985 motion picture adaptation of Neil Simon's The Slugger's Wife. He also penned the song "She's Got A Part of Me" from the soundtrack to the 1985 romantic comedy Secret Admirer.

Felder's television credits include FTV, a musical comedy show that parodied MTV and music videos which he hosted from 1985 to 1986, and Galaxy High, the 1986 CBS cartoon series for which he scored and performed all of the music, including the series' theme song.

=== Eagles reformation ===
Sparked by the success of the tribute album Common Thread: The Songs of the Eagles, the band (including Felder) regrouped 14 years later for a concert aired on MTV, which resulted in a new album, Hell Freezes Over, in 1994. For the live MTV performance, the band's signature song "Hotel California" was rearranged into an acoustic version and Felder kicked off the set by performing it with a new flamenco-style intro.

Felder performed (with all current and former band members) the hits "Take It Easy" and "Hotel California" at the band's 1998 induction into the Rock and Roll Hall of Fame in Manhattan, New York City. He continued as a member of Eagles until 2001.

=== Band termination and lawsuit against the Eagles ===
On February 6, 2001, Felder was fired from the Eagles. He responded by filing two lawsuits alleging wrongful termination, breach of implied-in-fact contract and breach of fiduciary duty, reportedly seeking $50 million in damages. Felder alleged that from the 1994 Hell Freezes Over tour onward, Henley and Frey had "insisted that they each receive a higher percentage of the band's profits", whereas the money had previously been split in five equal portions. Felder also accused them of coercing him into signing an agreement under which Henley and Frey would receive three times more of the Selected Works: 1972–1999 proceeds than would Felder. This box set, released in November 2000, has sold approximately 267,000 copies and earned over $16 million. Henley and Frey then countersued Felder for breach of contract, alleging that Felder had written and attempted to sell the rights to a "tell-all" book.

On January 23, 2002, the Los Angeles County Court consolidated the two complaints and on May 8, 2007, the case was settled out of court for an undisclosed amount. Despite the settlement, Felder has since filed subsequent lawsuits against the Eagles.

Heaven and Hell: My Life in The Eagles (1974–2001) was published in the United Kingdom on November 1, 2007. The American edition was published by John Wiley & Sons on April 28, 2008, with Felder embarking on a publicity campaign.

=== Post-Eagles ===
Nearly three decades after the release of Airborne, his second solo album, Road to Forever, was released on October 9, 2012, with "Fall from the Grace of Love" as the lead single, a song that featured the harmony vocals of Crosby, Stills & Nash.

When Eagles did their History of the Eagles Tour, 2013–2015, to coincide with their two-part documentary, it was criticized by Felder for being incomplete. He did not participate in the associated tour. Since 2005, Felder has been touring with his own band, the Don Felder Band. In 2014, they toured with rock bands Styx and Foreigner. In 2017, Felder toured the US with Styx and REO Speedwagon.

On April 5, 2019, Felder released his third studio album, American Rock 'n' Roll. The album features musicians such as Sammy Hagar, Slash (who lives near Felder), Richie Sambora, Orianthi, Peter Frampton, Joe Satriani, Mick Fleetwood, Chad Smith, Bob Weir, David Paich, Steve Porcaro, Alex Lifeson and Jim Keltner, among others. Felder went on a worldwide tour to promote the new album. The title track references artists from Jimi Hendrix and Santana to the Doobie Brothers, U2, Bruce Springsteen, Red Hot Chili Peppers, Van Halen, Guns N' Roses and more.

In 2026, Felder will appear with The Guess Who on their "Taking It Back Tour".

== Personal life ==
In 1971, Felder married Susan Pickersgill. They had four children and divorced in 2000.

In a 2008 interview with Howard Stern, Felder affirmed that he remained friends with fellow former Eagles members Bernie Leadon and Randy Meisner. When asked if he still had any contact with Glenn Frey or Don Henley, Felder stated that the only replies he received were from their respective attorneys. However, in a 2025 SiriusXM interview, Felder said of Henley "There are times here and there along the way where we bump into each other and [we're] very cordial about it."

In 2016, Felder told the Associated Press that he felt an "unbelievable sorrow" when he learned about Glenn Frey's death. "I had always hoped somewhere along the line, he and I would have dinner together, talking about old times and letting it go with a handshake and a hug."

== Artistry ==
=== Equipment ===
Felder is known for his performances using Gibson Les Paul and Gibson EDS-1275 (double-neck 6- and 12-string) electric guitars. This prompted Gibson to name two re-issues after him in 2010, the "Don Felder Hotel California 1959 Les Paul" and the "Don Felder Hotel California EDS-1275". Felder himself is an avid guitar collector, having amassed close to 300 models since childhood.

Felder uses Fender Deluxe Reverb and Tweed Deluxe amplifiers modified by Dumble Amplifiers. When performing Hotel California, the 12-string side of the 1275 plays through a Leslie speaker.

Felder's pedalboard consists of a Voodoo Labs Pedal Power, a Fulltone OCD overdrive, two Boss Digital Delay DD-3 delays, a Boss Chorus Ensemble chorus, an MXR Talk box, and a Peterson Stomp Classic tuner.

== Other activities ==
=== Autobiography ===
Felder's autobiography, Heaven and Hell: My Life in the Eagles (1974–2001), was published in early 2008. The book allowed Felder to tell his life story, describe his relationships with Glenn Frey and Don Henley, and to relate his own version of his termination from the band in 2001. In an interview on April 27, 2008, with Jim Farber of the New York Daily News, Felder is quoted as saying that he "wasn't out to hang people's heads for the whole community to see, that wasn't the point of the book. The point was to tell my story."

== Discography ==
=== Studio albums ===
- Airborne (1983) - U.S. No. 100
- Road to Forever (2012)
- American Rock 'n' Roll (2019)
- The Vault – Fifty Years of Music (2025)

=== Soundtrack albums ===
- Heavy Metal: Music from the Motion Picture (1981)
- Fast Times at Ridgemont High: Music From the Motion Picture (1982)
- The Slugger's Wife (1985)
- Secret Admirer (1985)

=== Singles ===
- "Heavy Metal (Takin' a Ride)" (1981) - U.S. No. 43
- "Free at Last" (2025)

=== With Eagles ===
==== Studio albums ====
- On the Border (1974)
- One of These Nights (1975)
- Hotel California (1976)
- The Long Run (1979)

==== Songs co-written by Felder ====
- "Visions" from One of These Nights (Don Felder & Don Henley)
- "Too Many Hands" from One of These Nights (Felder & Randy Meisner)
- "Victim of Love" from Hotel California (Felder, Henley, Glenn Frey, and JD Souther)
- "Hotel California" from Hotel California (Felder, Henley, and Frey)
- "The Disco Strangler" from The Long Run (Felder, Henley and Frey)
- "Those Shoes" from The Long Run (Felder, Henley and Frey)

==== Songs featuring Felder on lead vocal ====
- "Visions" from One of These Nights
