= Cornwall Coliseum =

Sport and entertainment venue in England

Coordinates: 50.3378°N 4.7321°W

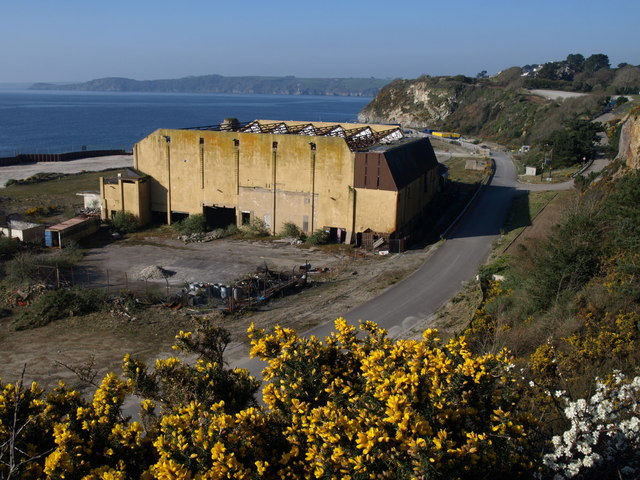
The derelict Cornwall Coliseum seen in 2009

Cornwall Coliseum was a sport and entertainment venue located at Carlyon Bay near St Austell, Cornwall, England. It hosted exhibitions, tennis tournaments and many concerts by leading musicians, but lost its importance with the opening of the Plymouth Pavilions in 1991.

== History ==
The Carlyon Beach area began to develop as a popular recreation area in the 20th century, with one of the visitors being Edward VIII who was at that time the Prince of Wales. During a visit he suggested that a sports club could be constructed on the beach for wealthy locals, and in the early 1930s the building, known as the Riviera Club, opened to the public. The complex featured a spa with swimming pool, tea rooms and tennis courts where Edward VIII and Wallis Simpson were reputed to have visited.

During the outbreak of World War II, the complex project's development, still not yet fully completed, was put to a halt. The beach was used for military operations in this time, however in the 1950s the complex re-opened and continued developing as a leisure and entertainment centre. In the early 1960s the complex, owned by a Mr. and Mrs. Lovett, had become a large concert venue, with a capacity of over 2000 seats and featuring a bar. The main auditorium area was previously the two indoor tennis courts. The complex became known as the New Cornish Riviera Lido, although the music venue still kept the Riviera Club name.

In the 1960s, the venue became increasingly popular, where the venue would bring in some major musical artists of the time including The Pretty Things, Chris Farlowe, Them, The Poets, Procol Harum, Herman's Hermits, The Kinks and DDDBMT. Each performance generally sold out, and the complex became a premier venue in the area.

The owner Mr. Lovett soon decided to run dances in the venue, however by the end of 1966 Newquay was becoming increasingly popular, with the Blue Lagoon and a number of smaller club/venues. The venue would enjoy a resurrection in the 1970s as punk and new wave peaked commercially, and was a popular venue on the new wave circuit. Through the 1970s and 1980s, various major acts of the era would perform at the venue, including Thin Lizzy, The Ramones, The Clash, The Jam, The Police, Marillion, The Cure, Status Quo, The Who, Eric Clapton, Black Sabbath, Cliff Richard, Iron Maiden, Rainbow, Slade, Bon Jovi, Simple Minds, Depeche Mode, Deborah Harry, T'Pau, Tina Turner, Wham! and Glen Campbell who recorded a live album there in 1981, as well as many comedy and light entertainment acts. During this period, the site was extended and featured a roller disco, amusement arcade, Wimpy restaurant and box office.

During the 1970s, the original badminton courts were developed into a disco known variously as Beelzebub, Bentleys, Quasars and lastly Gossips by the 1990s. The complex would be renamed firstly to Cornish Leisure World and then Cornwall Coliseum. The Cornwall Coliseum was one of the largest indoor venues of its kind during the 1980s. It had a licensed capacity of 3,400, standing, and a seated capacity of 2,600. In addition the discothèque won the discothèque of the year award when it was re-furbished in the late 1980s, which itself had a licensed capacity of approximately 750. During the 1980s the venue would play host to the Radio One road shows, and in 1986, Alison Moyet would record the music video for her single "Is This Love?" on the beach and outside the coliseum. Additionally, in 1988, T'Pau recorded a large part of the video for their single "Road to Our Dream" inside the venue during final production rehearsals for the "Rage Across Europe" tour.

In 1990, planning permission was obtained for holiday homes to be created in the surrounding area, together with a sea wall with rock armouring. The planning also included refurbishing and extending the Coliseum complex. This plan never materialised, as by the 1990s, the venue started to decline, despite the occasional performances of major artists such as The Cure, Jimmy Page & Robert Plant (of Led Zeppelin) and Paul McCartney. The venue started to compete against the bigger venues in both Plymouth and Devon, such Plymouth Pavilions, which opened in 1991, and the stadiums who could better accommodate the more popular acts.

In August 1998, the Megadog Beach Festival was held at the site using the car park as an outdoor stage, the permanent buildings as indoor stages and the beach itself as camping. 10,000 people attended and headliners included 808 State.

The venue continued until early 2003 when only the Gossips nightclub remained open, until its closure too shortly after. Ampersand acquired the venue in 2002 and aimed to create a privately funded world-class resort of 500 top-class apartments, with the main obstacle being the need for better sea defences. Despite clear plans of a 200 million blueprint, no work had taken place due to legal battles and public enquiries. Since then the coliseum has increasingly declined and was partly demolished from the inside. The roof was also removed, exposing the venue to open weather. The site remains out-of-bounds to the public and is considered unstable and dangerous.

Commercial Estates Group obtained planning permission in 2011 to redevelop the site.

Approval for a £250m redevelopment project was granted in February 2015 and demolition of the main building began in April 2015.
