= Sophia Gardens Pavilion =

Former performance venue in Cardiff, Wales

- Interactive map of the Sophia Gardens Pavilion area

General information
- Status: Demolished
- Location: Sophia Gardens, Cardiff, Wales
- Coordinates: 51.4822°N 3.188°W
- Opened: 1951
- Demolished: January 1982
- Owner: Cardiff County Borough Council

Sophia Gardens Pavilion was a performance venue located in Sophia Gardens, Cardiff, Wales. It was built in 1951 for the Festival of Britain and was the boxing and wrestling venue for the 1958 British Empire and Commonwealth Games.

== History ==
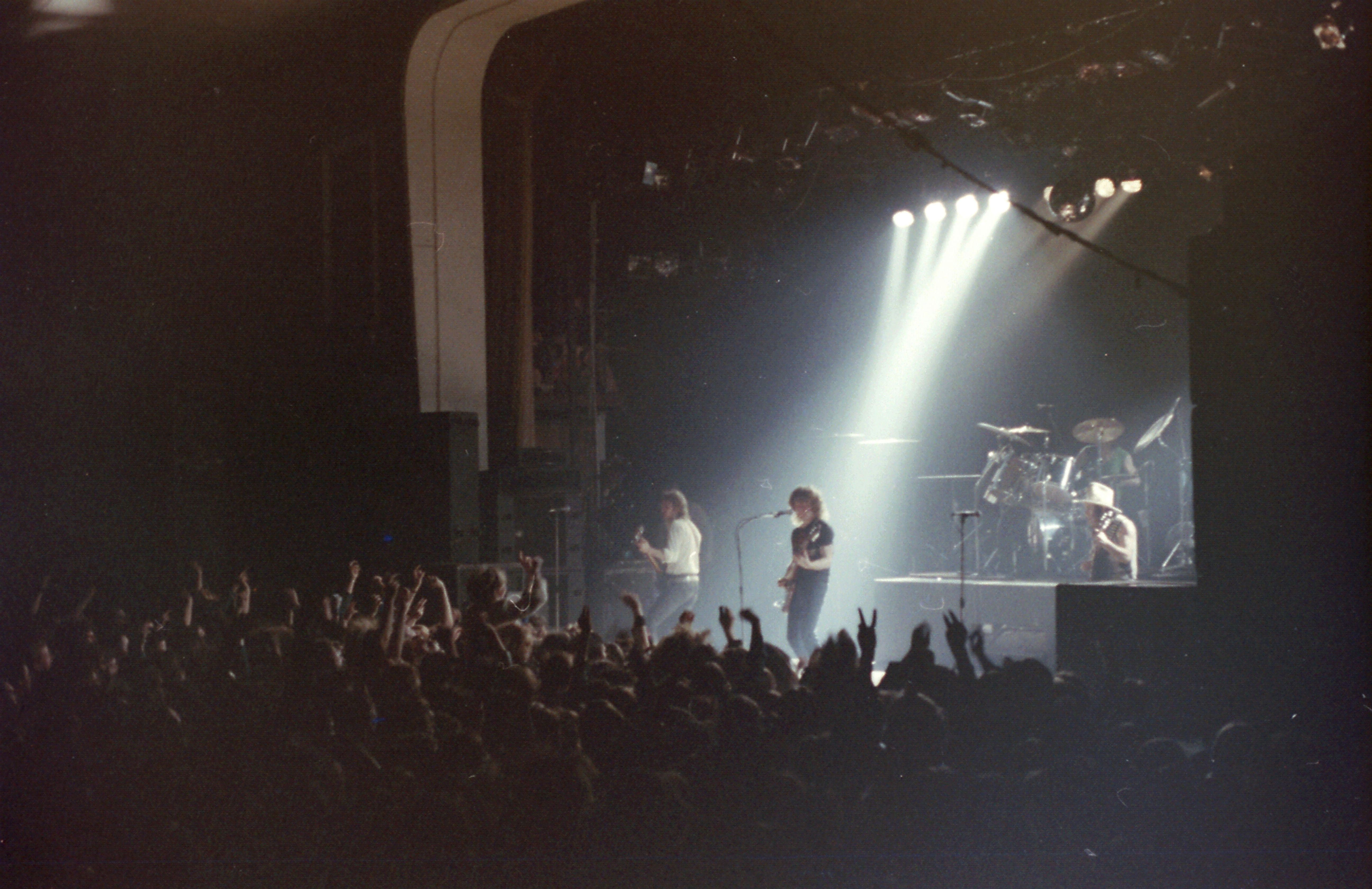
Slade on stage in 1981

The pavilion was built in 1951 for the Festival of Britain. Due to government restrictions on building materials during the post-war period, the framework of the building was adapted from a surplus aircraft hangar from RAF Stormy Down near Bridgend.

The building was host to many concerts, but during January 1982 the roof collapsed due to an estimated 4 ft (1.2 m) of snow, and the building was subsequently demolished. Just one month before the collapse, Cardiff Council had approved an extensive improvement programme, which would have cost approximately £100,000.

The pavilion was used for the boxing and wrestling competitions of the 1958 British Empire and Commonwealth Games.

Many notable performers played at the pavilion, including Danny Kaye, Cliff Richard, Jimi Hendrix, Pink Floyd and Slade.

== See also ==
- List of Commonwealth Games venues
