= Closing Time (album) =

Studio album by Tom Waits
- Released: March 6, 1973
- Recorded: Early 1972
- Studios: Sunset Sound (Hollywood); United Western (Hollywood)
- Genres: Folk; jazz; blues
- Length: 45:46
- Label: Asylum
- Producer: Jerry Yester

Tom Waits chronology
Closing Time (1973)	The Heart of Saturday Night (1974)

Singles from Closing Time
- 1. "Ol' '55" Released: 1973

Closing Time is the debut album by American singer-songwriter Tom Waits, released on March 6, 1973, on Asylum Records. Produced and arranged by former Lovin' Spoonful member Jerry Yester, Closing Time was the first of seven of Waits' major releases by Asylum.

The album is noted for being predominantly folk influenced although Waits intended Closing Time to be "a jazz, piano-led album." Upon release, the album was mildly successful in the United States, although it did not chart and received little attention from music press in the United Kingdom and elsewhere internationally. Critical reaction to Closing Time was positive. The album's only single, "Ol' '55", attracted attention due to a cover version by Waits's more popular label mates, the Eagles. Other songs from the album were covered by Tim Buckley and Bette Midler. The album was certified Gold in the UK and has gained a contemporary cult following among rock fans. Since its release, the album has been reissued on LP in 1976, on CD in 1992, 1999 and 2018. Also on 180-gram LP in 2010.

== Background ==
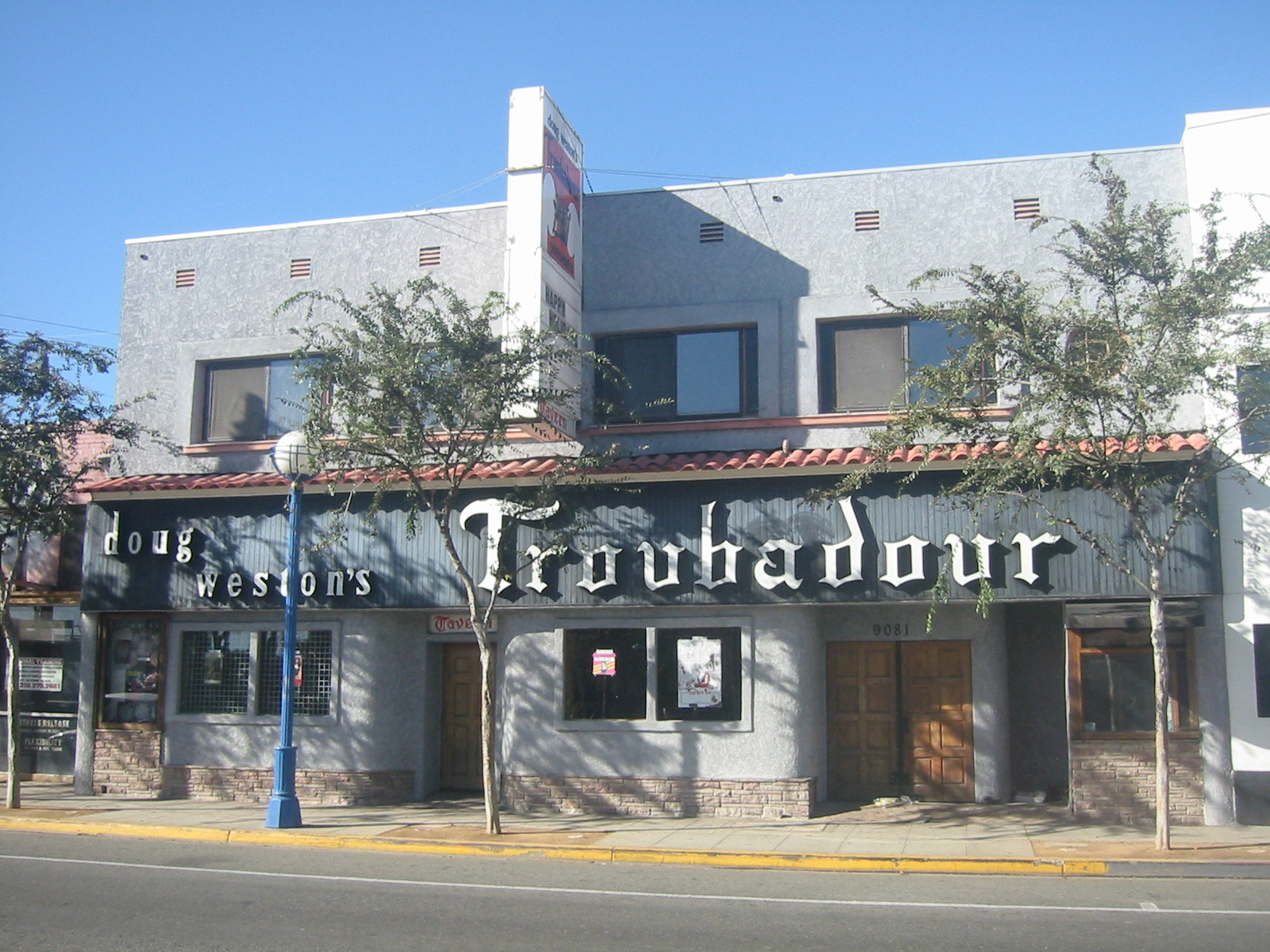
The Troubadour was the site of many early Waits performances

Tom Waits began his musical career in 1969, performing every Monday night at The Troubadour, a venue in West Hollywood, California. Waits' setlist at these series of shows, described as "hootenanny nights", consisted primarily of Bob Dylan covers, although it included songs which would later appear on Closing Time and its successor, The Heart of Saturday Night (1974). Among the songs performed were "Ice Cream Man", "Virginia Avenue", "Ol' '55", "I Hope That I Don't Fall in Love with You", "Shiver Me Timbers" and "Diamonds on my Windshield."

Around this time, Waits began working as a doorman at a San Diego, California, club, The Heritage, which was a coffee house by day. In November 1970, Waits performed his first paid show at The Heritage, earning $25 for his performance. At a Troubadour performance in summer 1971, Herb Cohen inadvertently spotted Waits and became his manager. Through Cohen's contacts, Waits recorded demos in Los Angeles in late summer 1971 with producer Robert Duffey, later released as The Early Years in two volumes, against Waits' wishes.

In order to focus on his career, Waits relocated from San Diego to Los Angeles in early 1972 and performed more frequently at The Troubadour, where David Geffen discovered him performing "Grapefruit Moon." The performance, which "floored" Geffen, led Geffen to negotiate with Waits' manager Cohen, and Waits signed to Asylum Records within a month.

== Recording ==
Before recording the album, Waits became friends with his designated producer Jerry Yester and one afternoon in early 1972 recorded a pre-production tape in Yester's residence. The instrumentation, recording arrangements, and musicians were also discussed during this session with Waits making it "absolutely clear he wanted a standup bass player." Drummer John Seiter, guitarist Peter Klimes, trumpeter Tony Terran and additional guitarist Shep Cooke were recruited through Yester and through Seiter, jazz bassist Bill Plummer was hired.

The main recording sessions for Closing Time took place at Sunset Sound Recorders in Hollywood, California—where Buffalo Springfield, Joni Mitchell, Neil Young and the Doors had previously recorded—in Spring 1972. Yester fronted production and the sessions were held almost immediately after Waits' record deal, and were described as "quick and efficient." Waits was "nervous, but confident enough in his own material" during the beginning of the sessions; however, as the sessions progressed, Waits and Yester "were pulling against each other" over the direction which the album would take, with Waits wanting a jazz-laden record and Yester more focused on producing a folk-based album. Despite this, Waits was "absolutely communicative" with his fellow musicians, articulating his direction and using metaphors to describe how he wanted the songs to sound.

The sessions took a total of ten days, with the first two days focusing on "getting used to [the studio]." Both Waits and Yester wanted to record during the evening, but as no slots were available, it was recorded through the morning and afternoon "from ten to five every day." During the recording of "Ol' '55", Seiter contributed backing vocals and "came up with a perfect harmony line that started faintly before the chorus even began." The sessions concluded with a total of nine songs completed. Though unsatisfied with the number of songs, a second recording session was arranged the following week in United Western Recorders. The final session for Closing Time began the following Sunday, with guest musicians Arni Egilsson replacing Plummer and Jesse Erlich performing cello.

The title track, "Closing Time", was the only song recorded in full, and Yester later described the session as "the most magical session I've ever been involved with. At the end of it, no one spoke for what felt like five minutes, either in the booth or out in the room. No one budged. Nobody wanted the moment to end." String overdubs were later cut for "Martha" and "Grapefruit Moon" the following day. The final recordings were mixed and mastered at Wally Heider Studios in San Francisco.

== Composition ==
"Ol' 55"
The album's opening track features distinctive use of piano with folk-led instrumentation, a key factor to how the album eventually sounded.

Closing Time features an eclectic mix of musical styles. Songs such as "Ol '55", with its "gentle slipnote piano chords", and "Old Shoes", "a country-rock waltz that picked up the feel of 'Ol' 55'", are usually considered folk-like. Other songs such as "Virginia Avenue", "Midnight Lullaby", whose outro features an instrumental segment of the nursery rhyme "Hush Little Baby", and "Grapefruit Moon" reveal a quieter, more jazz-like temperament. "Ice Cream Man" is often noted as being the most "up-tempo" song of the album, whereas "Lonely" is toned-down and slow-paced. The sophisticated piano melodies are often accompanied by trumpets, typical of the jazz sound that Waits originally designated for the album. Noticeable string arrangements are also featured on the album, on "Martha" and the final song "Closing Time", the latter being purely instrumental.

The songs on Closing Time are often noted for their lyrical content and vary in form. "Ol' '55" narrates the story of a man riding "lickety splitly" in a car and is often seen as a song about escapism, "like his near-contemporary Bruce Springsteen." This theme is also present in "Old Shoes" which narrates another story about "a footloose young stud hitting the road and semi-sneering", particularly in lyrics such as "your tears cannot bind me anymore" and "my heart was not born to be tamed." Other lyrics on the album are described as melancholic, particularly "Lonely", "I Hope That I Don't Fall in Love with You" and "Grapefruit Moon", which are "both self-conscious and lacklustre". The intro to "Midnight Lullaby" borrows lyrics from the English nursery rhyme "Sing a Song of Sixpence". This form of song-writing became a lifelong habit of Waits following the writing of "Midnight Lullaby", in which he "assembled lyrics from fragments of oral tradition."

== Packaging ==
Closing Time's art was designed by Cal Schenkel. Schenkel's front cover art was inspired by "Waits' own idea of how the album should sound." It depicts Waits leaning against a bar-room piano which is furnished with a shot of rye, a bottle of beer, cigarettes, an ashtray and a small candle with a blue pool table lamp above Waits' head. The back cover art is minimal and only features a photograph of Waits staring directly into the camera, reputedly taken after one of Waits' performances at The Troubadour. Both photographs were taken by Ed Caraeff.

== Release ==
Closing Time was released by Asylum on March 6, 1973. The album's lead single, "Ol' '55", was released a month before the album for promotion. The single featured the same song pressed on both sides of the record, with the A-side in mono and the B-side in stereo. Waits' first national tour coincided with the album's release and ran from April to June 1973. The band consisted of Waits on vocals, acoustic guitar, and piano, Bob Webb on double bass, Rich Phelps on trumpet, and John Forsha on guitar. The tour started at The Cellar Door in Washington, D.C., with Waits opening for Tom Rush. Then he played at venues such as Max's Kansas City in New York City and The Boarding House in San Francisco, opening for Danny O'Keefe, Charlie Rich, Buffalo Bob Smith—of Howdy Doody—and John P. Hammond. A second tour ran from November to December 1973 with Waits opening for Frank Zappa. This tour consisted of Waits on vocals, acoustic guitar, and piano, with Bob Webb on double bass. In 1999 Elektra Records reissued Closing Time in Europe on limited edition CD, and in 2010 Elektra and Asylum reissued the album on CD and LP, respectively.

== Reception ==
Professional ratings
Review scores
Source	Rating
AllMusic	4.5/5 stars
Christgau's Record Guide	B+
Classic Rock	8/10
Mojo	4/5 stars
Pitchfork	8.7/10
Q	3/5 stars
Record Collector	4/5 stars
The Rolling Stone Album Guide	4.5/5 stars
Uncut	3/5 stars

After its release, Closing Time was received positively by the American music press, although coverage was limited.

In Rolling Stone, critic Stephen Holden praised it as "a remarkable debut album" and branded Waits as "a boozier, earthier version" of Randy Newman who similarly "delights in rummaging through the attics of nostalgia". Holden nonetheless noted that "the persona that emerges from [Closing Time] is Waits's own, at once sardonic, vulnerable and emotionally charged".

Village Voice critic Robert Christgau noted that with his "jazz-schooled piano and drawling delivery ... Waits exploits an honest sentimentality which he undercuts just enough to be credible".

Robert Hilburn of the Los Angeles Times gave the album a mixed review, noting that “at times his songs just sag,” but adding that “he can reach you at other times with a rhyme or a thought that makes you realize his potential.”

The album received little coverage internationally, with its promotion in the UK being little more than a featured advert in the NME. Closing Time did not chart upon its release although in 2000, the album peaked at number 28 in the Irish Albums Chart. The album was certified Silver in the United Kingdom in 2004 with shipments of over 60,000 copies and was later certified Gold in 2012 with shipments of over 100,000 copies.

== Legacy ==
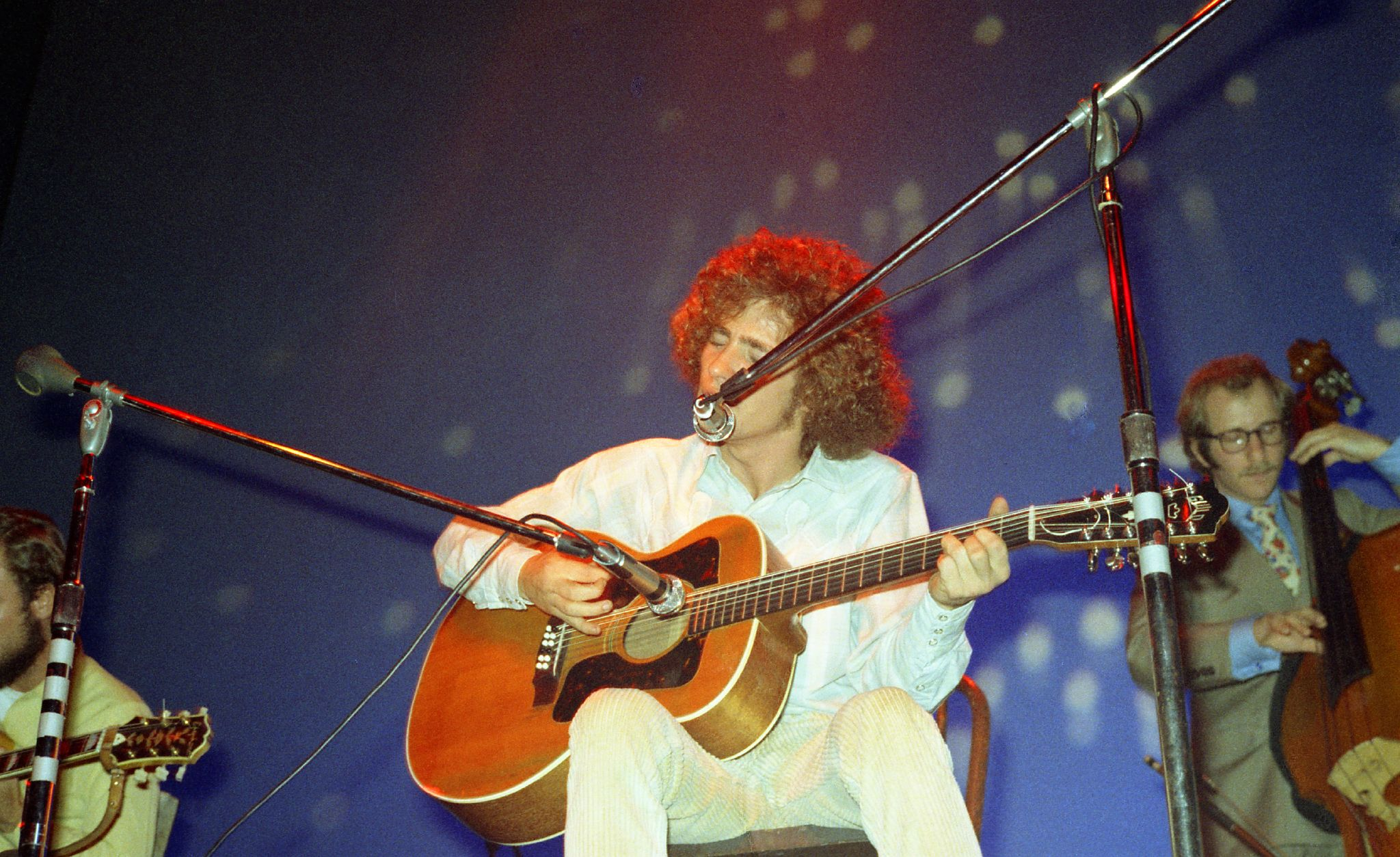
Tim Buckley covered "Martha" the same year it was released

William Ruhlmann, in a retrospective AllMusic review, holds the album in high regard, describing Waits' "lovelorn lyrics" as being "sentimental without being penetrating", while also noting Waits' "gift for gently rolling pop melodies" and "self-conscious melancholy", the latter of which "can be surprisingly moving". In 2000, Closing Time was voted number 880 in Colin Larkin's All Time Top 1000 Albums.

Closing Time reached a wider audience through cover versions of its songs by more successful artists and have since continued to have been covered. Later in 1973, Tim Buckley released the album Sefronia, with a cover of "Martha," the first ever cover of a Waits song by a known artist. Buckley's version was also included in the 1995 tribute compilation Step Right Up: The Songs of Tom Waits. "Martha" was covered again in 1979 by Bette Midler on Saturday Night Live and by Meat Loaf on Welcome to the Neighborhood (1995). "Ol' '55" was recorded by the Eagles for On the Border (1974). "Rosie" was recorded by the Beat Farmers for their album The Pursuit of Happiness. (1987) "Ice Cream Man" was covered in 1991 by Screamin' Jay Hawkins for Black Music For White People and "Lonely" was covered live by Bat for Lashes and included on the deluxe edition of her album Two Suns (2009). Covers of "I Hope That I Don't Fall in Love with You" can be found on Step Right Up (by 10,000 Maniacs), The Prince and Me soundtrack (by Marc Cohn), Hootie & the Blowfish's Scattered, Smothered and Covered compilation, 10,000 Maniacs' Campfire Songs compilation, and "Heart and Soul," an episode of Ally McBeal, where it is sung by Jon Bon Jovi.

== Track listing ==
All songs written and composed by Tom Waits.

Side one
No.	Title	Length
1.	"Ol' '55"	3:58
2.	"I Hope That I Don't Fall in Love with You"	3:54
3.	"Virginia Avenue"	3:10
4.	"Old Shoes (& Picture Postcards)"	3:40
5.	"Midnight Lullaby"	3:26
6.	"Martha"	4:30

Side two
No.	Title	Length
7.	"Rosie"	4:03
8.	"Lonely"	3:12
9.	"Ice Cream Man"	3:05
10.	"Little Trip to Heaven (On the Wings of Your Love)"	3:38
11.	"Grapefruit Moon"	4:50
12.	"Closing Time"	4:20
Total length:		45:46

== Personnel ==
=== Musicians ===
- Tom Waits – vocals, piano, guitar, harmonium, harpsichord, celeste
- Delbert Bennett – trumpet
- Shep Cooke – guitar, backing vocals on "Old Shoes (& Picture Postcards)"
- Peter Klimes – guitar, pedal steel guitar on "Rosie"
- Bill Plummer – double bass
- John Seiter – drums; backing vocals on "Ol' 55" and "Rosie"

=== Guest musicians ===
- Arni Egilsson – bass guitar on "Closing Time"
- Jesse Ehrlich – cello on "Martha"
- Tony Terran – trumpet solo on "Closing Time"

=== Technical personnel ===
- Ed Caraeff – photography
- Richie Moore – additional engineering
- Cal Schenkel – design, artwork
- Jerry Yester – production, engineering

== Charts ==
2000 chart performance for Closing Time
Chart (2000)	Peak position
Irish Albums (OCC)	29

2023 chart performance for Closing Time
Chart (2023)	Peak position
German Albums (Offizielle Top 100)	44

== Certifications ==
Region	Certification	Certified units/sales
United Kingdom (BPI)	Gold	100,000^{^}
^{^} Shipments figures based on certification alone.
