= Common Thread: The Songs of the Eagles =

Compilation album by various artists
- Released: October 12, 1993
- Genre: Country
- Length: 56:46
- Label: Giant
- Producer: Various

Singles from Common Thread
- 1. "Take It Easy" Released: 1994

Common Thread: The Songs of the Eagles is a tribute album to American rock band Eagles. It was released in 1993 on Giant Records to raise funds for the Walden Woods Project. The album features covers of various Eagles songs, as performed by country music acts. It was certified 3× Platinum in the United States by the Recording Industry Association of America (RIAA) on June 27, 1994, honoring shipments of three million copies in the United States. Several cuts from the album all charted on the Billboard Hot Country Songs charts after the album's release, the most successful being Travis Tritt's rendition of "Take It Easy" at number 21. Common Thread won all of its performers a Country Music Association Award for Album of the Year at the 1994 ceremony.

== Background ==
The album was initiated by Eagles co-founder Don Henley with help from the band's manager, Irving Azoff. It was intended as a charity album to raise funds for the Walden Woods Project that Henley founded in 1990 to buy the land around Walden Pond in Concord, Massachusetts. On the back cover of the album, it states:

A portion of the royalties from the sales of this collection will go to the Walden Woods Project, a non-profit organization founded in 1990. The purpose of the Walden Woods Project is to purchase, and thereby preserve, environmentally sensitive and historically significant forestland located near Henry David Thoreau's famed retreat at Walden Pond.

The idea for a charity album with country musicians came after a Walden Woods benefit concert in Los Angeles in May 1992 where several country artists also appeared. Later in the year at the 1992 Country Music Awards show, where Henley performed with Trisha Yearwood in a duet, a number of artists told Henley how the Eagles’ music had inspired them. Henley and Azoff then decided that the project may be feasible, and with the help of record producer James Stroud, a number of country musicians were chosen for the album. The Eagles themselves were not involved as a band in this project, however, and none of its members played on the album, although Timothy B. Schmit provided harmony vocals for Vince Gill's rendition of "I Can't Tell You Why".

=== "Take It Easy" ===
The most notable track in the album was the cover of "Take It Easy" by Travis Tritt. In March 1994, the song reached No. 21 on the US Country chart, and No. 12 on the Canadian RPM chart. For the music video of his rendition of "Take It Easy", Tritt requested that Eagles join him for the filming, and the resulting video featured the full Long Run-era lineup of the Eagles (Glenn Frey, Don Henley, Don Felder, Joe Walsh, and Schmit). It would be the first time since disbanding in 1980 that the five members of the band appeared together (Frey, Henley, Walsh and Schmit, however, had all united for a benefit concert in 1990). Their appearance on the video subsequently led to the band being officially reformed. Both Frey and Henley met with their management over lunch two months later and agreed to a reunion. A new album, Hell Freezes Over, was released and a concert tour launched the following year. Frey, who had previously been reluctant to reunite with the band, later said of the making of the video: "After years passed, you really sort of remember that you were friends first ... I just remembered how much we genuinely had liked each other and how much fun we'd had."

== Critical reception ==
Professional ratings
Review scores
Source	Rating
Allmusic -	2/5 stars
Entertainment Weekly	B−

An uncredited review from AllMusic rated the album 2 out of 5 stars, stating that "Ironically, all of the interpretations on Common Thread are more pop/rock-oriented than the original versions, making the album a well-intentioned but pointless exercise." David Browne of Entertainment Weekly rated the album "B−". He criticized the album for lacking "harder songs, like 'Life in the Fast Lane'", as well as the arrangements of the artists' recordings. Although he described the latter as "slavishly devoted to the original recordings", Browne thought that the vocal performances of Tanya Tucker, Alan Jackson, and John Anderson were among the strongest.

== Track listing ==
No.	Title	Writer(s)	Producer(s)	Length
1.	"Take It Easy" (Travis Tritt)	Jackson Browne, Glenn Frey	James Stroud	3:32
2.	"Peaceful Easy Feeling" (Little Texas)	Jack Tempchin	Christy DiNapoli, Doug Grau	4:19
3.	"Desperado" (Clint Black)	Don Henley, Frey	James Stroud	3:51
4.	"Heartache Tonight" (John Anderson)	Henley, Frey, Bob Seger, JD Souther	James Stroud	4:23
5.	"Tequila Sunrise" (Alan Jackson)	Henley, Frey	Keith Stegall	2:56
6.	"Take It to the Limit" (Suzy Bogguss)	Randy Meisner, Henley, Frey	Suzy Bogguss	4:32
7.	"I Can't Tell You Why" (Vince Gill)	Timothy B. Schmit, Henley, Frey	Tony Brown	4:04
8.	"Lyin' Eyes" (Diamond Rio)	Henley, Frey	Monty Powell	6:30
9.	"New Kid in Town" (Trisha Yearwood)	Henley, Frey, Souther	Garth Fundis	5:07
10.	"Saturday Night" (Billy Dean)	Meisner, Henley, Frey, Bernie Leadon	Lynn Peterzell, Billy Dean	3:25
11.	"Already Gone" (Tanya Tucker)	Tempchin, Robb Stradlund	Jerry Crutchfield	5:00
12.	"Best of My Love" (Brooks & Dunn)	Henley, Frey, Souther	Don Cook, Scott Hendricks	4:38
13.	"The Sad Café" (Lorrie Morgan)	Henley, Frey, Joe Walsh, Souther	Richard Landis	4:45

== Personnel ==
Compiled from liner notes.

Musicians

"Take It Easy"

- Larry Byrom – acoustic guitar
- Sonny Garrish – steel guitar
- Byron House – bass guitar
- Dann Huff – electric guitar
- Paul Leim – drums
- Steve Nathan – keyboards
- Joe Spivey – banjo
- Curtis Wright – background vocals
- Curtis Young – background vocals

"Peaceful Easy Feeling"

- Denny Dadmun-Bixby – bass guitar
- Del Gray – drums
- Porter Howell – 6-string bass, acoustic guitar, electric guitar
- Dwayne O'Brien – lead vocals, background vocals
- Duane Propes – background vocals
- Tim Rushlow – background vocals

"Desperado"

- Dane Bryant – keyboards
- Dick Gay – drums
- Dann Huff – electric guitar
- Hayden Nicholas – electric guitar
- Nashville String Machine – strings
- Jeff Peterson – steel guitar
- Jake Willemaim – bass guitar
- Martin Young – acoustic guitar

"Heartache Tonight"

- John Anderson – background vocals
- Larry Byrom – acoustic guitar
- Dann Huff – electric guitar
- Paul Leim – drums
- Gary Smith – keyboards
- Glenn Worf – bass guitar
- Curtis Wright – background vocals
- Curtis Young – background vocals

"Tequila Sunrise"

- Eddie Bayers – drums
- Stuart Duncan – fiddle
- Paul Franklin – steel guitar
- Roy Huskey Jr. – upright bass
- Brent Mason – electric guitar
- Hargus "Pig" Robbins – keyboards
- John Wesley Ryles – background vocals
- Keith Stegall – acoustic guitar

"Take It to the Limit"

- Eddie Bayers – drums
- Suzy Bogguss – background vocals
- Beth Nielsen Chapman – background vocals
- Dan Dugmore – steel guitar
- Kirk "Jellyroll" Johnson – harmonica
- Matt Rollings – keyboards
- Tom Roady – percussion
- Brent Rowan – acoustic guitar, electric guitar
- Leland Sklar – bass guitar
- Harry Stinson – background vocals

"I Can't Tell You Why"

- Vince Gill – background vocals
- Jim Horn – soprano saxophone
- David Hungate – bass guitar
- George Marinelli – electric guitar
- Steve Nathan – Hammond B-3 organ, synthesizer
- Timothy B. Schmit – background vocals
- Milton Sledge – drums
- Pete Wasner – Wurlitzer electric piano

"Lyin' Eyes"

- Gene Johnson – mandolin, background vocals
- Jimmy Olander – acoustic guitar, electric guitar
- Brian Prout – drums
- Marty Roe – lead vocals
- Dan Truman – keyboards
- Dana Williams – bass guitar, background vocals

"New Kid in Town"

- Eddie Bayers – drums
- Joe Chemay – background vocals
- Garth Fundis – background vocals
- Al Kooper – Hammond B-3 organ
- George Marinelli – electric guitar
- Matt Rollings – keyboards
- Dave Pomeroy – bass guitar
- Steuart Smith – acoustic guitar, electric guitar
- Harry Stinson – background vocals
- Billy Joe Walker Jr. – acoustic guitar

"Saturday Night"

- Billy Dean – background vocals
- Dan Dugmore – steel guitar
- Rob Hajacos – fiddle
- John Barlow Jarvis – keyboards
- Brent Rowan – electric guitar
- Biff Watson – acoustic guitar
- Lonnie Wilson – drums
- Glenn Worf – bass guitar

"Already Gone"

- Eddie Bayers – drums
- Gary Burr – background vocals
- Larry Byrom – acoustic guitar, electric guitar
- Carol Chase – background vocals
- Steve Gibson – electric guitar
- John Barlow Jarvis – keyboards
- Michael Rhodes – bass guitar
- Dennis Wilson – background vocals

"Best of My Love"

- Bruce Bouton – steel guitar
- Mark Casstevens – acoustic guitar
- Bill LaBounty – keyboards
- Brent Rowan – electric guitar
- John Wesley Ryles – background vocals
- Dennis Wilson – background vocals
- Lonnie Wilson – drums, percussion
- Glenn Worf – bass guitar

"The Sad Café"

- Michael Black – background vocals
- Larry Byrom – acoustic guitar
- Paul Franklin – steel guitar
- Dann Huff – electric guitar
- Paul Leim – drums
- Gary Prim – keyboards
- Dennis Wilson – background vocals
- Glenn Worf – bass guitar
- Curtis Young – background vocals

Technical

- Carl Gorodetzky – string contractor on "Desperado"
- Joe Layne – string copyist on "Desperado"
- Jim Ed Norman – string arrangements on "Desperado"

Production The 1994 Country Music Association (CMA) award for Album of the Year was awarded jointly to Suzy Bogguss, Tony Brown, Don Cook, Jerry Crutchfield, Billy Dean, Christy DiNapoli, Garth Fundis, Doug Grau, Scott Hendricks, Richard Landis, Lynn Peterzell, Monty Powell, Keith Stegall, and James Stroud for their contributions in producing the album.

- Executive Production: James Stroud
- Production Assistants: Lisa Bradley, Allison Brown, Ginny Johnson, Scott Paschall, Doug Rich, Roxanne Stueve, Jane West
- Engineers: Mike Bradley, Mike Clute, John Kelton, Tim Kish, Gary Laney (also mix assistant), Steve Lowery, Steve Marcantonio, Mike McCarthy, Lynn Peterzell (also overdub engineer), Csaba Petocz, Marty Williams
- Assistant Engineers: Derek Bason (also assistant engineer for overdubs), Pasquale Delvillaggio, Mark Hagen (also mix assistant), Ken Hutton (also assistant engineer for overdubs), Julian King (also assistant engineer for overdubs & mix assistant), Russ Martin, Herb Tassin, John Thomas II (also mix assistant), Craig White
- Mixing: Mike Bradley, Garth Fundis, John Guess, John Kelton, Lynn Peterzell, Marty Williams (also mix assistant)

== Charts and certification ==
=== Weekly charts ===
Chart (1993)	Peak position
Canadian Country Albums (RPM)	1
Canada Top Albums/CDs (RPM)	22
US Billboard 200	3
US Top Country Albums (Billboard)	1

=== Year-end charts ===
Chart (1993)	Position
US Top Country Albums (Billboard)	32
Chart (1994)	Position
US Billboard 200	25
US Top Country Albums (Billboard)	2

=== Charted songs ===
Year	Single	Performed by	Peak positions	
Year	Single	Performed by	US Country	CAN Country
1993	"Desperado"	Clint Black	54	52
1993	"I Can't Tell You Why"	Vince Gill	42	26
1993	"Tequila Sunrise"	Alan Jackson	64	—
1993	"Peaceful Easy Feeling"	Little Texas	73	—
1993	"Take It Easy"	Travis Tritt	21	12
1993	"Already Gone"	Tanya Tucker	75	—
"—" denotes releases that did not chart

=== Certifications ===
Region	Certification	Certified units/sales
Canada (Music Canada)	Platinum	100,000^{^}
United States (RIAA)	3× Platinum	3,000,000^{^}
^{^} Shipments figures based on certification alone.
