= Best of My Love (Eagles song) =

1974 single by the Eagles

Single by Eagles

from the album On the Border
- B-side: "Ol' '55"
- Released: November 5, 1974
- Studio: Olympic (London, UK)
- Genre: Soft rock; country rock; folk rock
- Length: 3:25 (single edit); 4:34 (album version)
- Label: Asylum
- Songwriters: Don Henley; Glenn Frey; JD Souther
- Producer: Glyn Johns

Eagles singles chronology
"James Dean" (1974)	"Best of My Love" (1974)	"One of These Nights" (1975)

"Best of My Love" is a song written by Don Henley, Glenn Frey, and JD Souther. It was originally recorded by the Eagles (with Henley singing lead vocals), and included on their 1974 album On the Border. The song was released as the third single from the album, and it became the band's first Billboard Hot 100 number 1 single in March 1975. The song also topped the easy listening (adult contemporary) chart for one week a month earlier. Billboard ranked it as the number 12 song for 1975.

== Background ==
=== Composition ===
In 2009, JD Souther said of the writing of "Best of My Love": "Glenn found the tune; the tune I think came from a Fred Neil record... We were working on that album (On the Border) and came to London. The three of us were writing it and were on deadline to get it finished. I don't know where we got the inspiration."

Glenn Frey recalled: "I was playing acoustic guitar one afternoon in Laurel Canyon, and I was trying to figure out a tuning that Joni Mitchell had shown me a couple of days earlier. I got lost and ended up with the guitar tuning for what would later turn out to be 'The Best of My Love.'" According to Henley, most of the lyrics were written while in a booth in the Dan Tana's Restaurant close to the Troubadour. The maître d' of Dan Tana, Guido, was thanked in the liner notes of the album. The lyrics were inspired in part by Henley's break up with his then girlfriend Suzannah Martin.

=== Recording ===
"Best of My Love" was recorded at Olympic Studios in London. The Eagles had begun working on On the Border with producer Glyn Johns who had helmed their Eagles debut album and the follow-up Desperado album. Despite the success of their debut album the Eagles (Frey specifically) were unhappy over Johns' preference for country rock and toning down their own rock aspirations, and their dissatisfaction with Johns was reinforced by the similarly honed Desperado album which was a comparative failure and Johns' no-drug policy during the recording. After six weeks in London—which yielded "Best of My Love" and one other usable track, "You Never Cry Like a Lover"—the Eagles discontinued working with Johns, then spending eight weeks touring in Europe and the US, before completing the recording of On the Border at the Record Plant in their hometown of Los Angeles with Bill Szymczyk producing. "Best of My Love" was remixed by Szymczyk.

=== Single release ===
Frey was reluctant to release "Best of My Love" as a single and held off its release for some time. The release of the Eagles' "Best of My Love" as a single has been attributed to the track's airplay at WKMI-AM in Kalamazoo MI, where radio dj Jim Higgs - also station music & program director - began playing the track off its parent album On the Border soon after that album's release in the spring of 1974, favoring "Best of My Love" over the official single releases "Already Gone" and "James Dean". Advised by Higgs of the strong positive response of WKMI's listeners to "Best of My Love", Asylum Records gave the track a limited single release of 1000 copies available only in the Kalamazoo area, with reaction to this test-release securing the full release of "Best of My Love" as a single on November 5, 1974.

When the single was finally released, Asylum Records had truncated the song so that it would be more radio-friendly, but had done so without the band's knowledge or approval. It caused considerable anger in the band, and Henley demanded that the single be pulled from stores. The song however would become the most successful of their singles released so far, giving the band their first number 1 single. When the song was judged to have sold a million copies, the Eagles' manager, Irving Azoff, sent to Asylum Records a gold record with a piece cut out, mounted on a plaque with a caption that said "The Golden Hacksaw Award".

Cash Box called it "a very pretty country flavored ballad" and said "the harmonies are of the usual Eagle excellence and the instrumentation is mild and acoustic." Record World called it a "folksy ballad" which "has the easy-goin' beauty to be one of [the Eagles] biggest and best" and said that "soaring production takes their harmonies sky high."

== Personnel ==
- Don Henley – lead vocals, brushed drums
- Glenn Frey – double-tracked 12-string acoustic guitar, background vocals
- Bernie Leadon – pedal steel guitar, background vocals
- Randy Meisner – bass, background vocals

== Chart history ==
=== Weekly charts ===
Chart (1975)	Peak position
Australia (Kent Music Report)	14
Canada Top Singles (RPM)	1
Canada Adult Contemporary (RPM)	1
US Billboard Hot 100	1
US Adult Contemporary (Billboard)	1
US Cashbox Top 100	4

=== Year-end charts ===
Chart (1975)	Rank
Australia (Kent Music Report)	95
Canada RPM Top Singles	30
U.S. Billboard Hot 100	12

== Cover versions ==
Prior to the release of the Eagles version as a single, John Lees released his version of "Best of My Love" as a single in 1974. The 5th Dimension sang a cover on their 1974 Soul and Inspiration album. The song was also covered by Yvonne Elliman on her 1975 album, Rising Sun. South African trumpeter Hugh Masekela covered the song on his 1976 album Melody Maker.

In 1993, country duo Brooks & Dunn recorded their version for the Eagles tribute album Common Thread: The Songs of the Eagles. Rod Stewart included the song on his 2006 covers album Still the Same... Great Rock Classics of Our Time.

== See also ==
- List of RPM number-one singles of 1975
- List of Hot 100 number-one singles of 1975 (U.S.)
- List of number-one adult contemporary singles of 1975 (U.S.)
