= Ol' '55 =

Single by Tom Waits

from the album Closing Time
- B-side: "Midnight Lullaby"
- Released: 1973
- Recorded: Spring 1972 at Sunset Sound Recorders and United Western Recorders in Hollywood, California
- Genre: Folk
- Length: 3:58
- Label: Asylum
- Songwriter: Tom Waits
- Producer: Jerry Yester

Tom Waits singles chronology
"Ol' '55" (1973)	"Blues Skies" (1974)

"Ol' '55" is a song by American musician Tom Waits. It is the opening track and lead single from Waits' debut studio album, Closing Time, released in March 1973 on Asylum Records. Written by Waits and produced by Jerry Yester, "Ol' '55" was a minor hit. It has been described as more conventional than Waits' later songs. The title, "Ol' '55", refers to the singer's vehicle, a 1955 Buick Roadmaster, "the first real luxury automobile I had ... about as slick as deer guts on a doorknob."

The song has been covered by numerous artists, most notably by the Eagles for their 1974 album On The Border. In a 1975 interview, Waits was critical of the Eagles' cover version of his song, admitting that he was "not that particularly crazy about (their) rendition of it ... I thought their version was a little antiseptic." About one year later, in an interview with NME, he went as far as stating, "I don’t like the Eagles. They’re about as exciting as watching paint dry. Their albums are good for keeping the dust off your turntable and that’s about all.”

After the Eagles performed the song at the band’s millennium concert in 1999, Glenn Frey told the audience, “Tom didn’t really like our version of Ol’ ’55 when it first came out … and then he got the (royalties) check. Since then, Tom and I, we’re really close.”

The song was used for All Elite Wrestling's Brodie Lee tribute video during his Celebration of Life. AEW President and CEO Tony Khan purchased the rights to the song in perpetuity, saying "so the tribute will last forever".

== Notable cover versions ==
- The Eagles on the album On the Border (1974), and a live version on disc 4 of their 2000 compilation Selected Works: 1972–1999. It was also the B-side of the single Best of My Love.
