= James Dean (song) =

Single by Eagles

from the album On the Border
- B-side: "Good Day in Hell"
- Released: August 14, 1974
- Recorded: 1973
- Genre: Hard rock; rock and roll; rockabilly
- Length: 3:36
- Label: Asylum
- Songwriters: Don Henley; Glenn Frey; Jackson Browne; JD Souther
- Producer: Bill Szymczyk

Eagles singles chronology
"Already Gone" (1974)	"James Dean" (1974)	"Best of My Love" (1974)

"James Dean" is a song written by Don Henley, Glenn Frey, Jackson Browne, and JD Souther, and recorded by the American rock band Eagles for their 1974 album On the Border. It was the second single released from this album, reaching number 77 on the U.S. pop singles chart.

The song is about American actor James Dean (1931–1955). The lyrics, "too fast to live, too young to die" refer to the life and abrupt death of Dean in a car crash in 1955. Bernie Leadon played the guitar solo.

== Background ==
"James Dean" was first written for a planned album dedicated to antiheroes. According to Glenn Frey, he, together with Don Henley, Jackson Browne, and JD Souther, were jamming together after attending a Tim Hardin show at the Troubadour in 1972, and they came up with the idea of doing an album about antiheroes. From this came the songs "Doolin-Dalton" and "James Dean". The album however evolved into a wild-west themed album Desperado which was released in 1973, and "James Dean" was shelved. When recording began for On the Border, the song was immediately pulled off the shelf and completed. The song was written mostly by Jackson Browne according to Henley.

The B-side "Good Day in Hell" is the first Eagles track recorded with Don Felder, who joined the band midway through the sessions for the album.

== Reception ==
Billboard described "James Dean" as "good solid rocker" with "fine vocal harmonies" whose instrumentation is reminiscent of Jackson Browne's 1973 song "Redneck Friend," on which Eagles guitarist Glenn Frey provided backup vocals. Cash Box said that this is "one of the best rockers to come around in years", that "lyrically, the tribute to the legendary film star is letter perfect", and that "musically, well, just try to keep from dancing here." Record World said that the "legendary screen idol of the '50s still stands tall as a rebellious figure, worthy of the contemporary missive that these men definitely deliver with all due cause, speed and prowess." Ultimate Classic Rock critic Sterling Whitaker rated it as the Eagles 8th most underrated song. Classic Rock critic Paul Elliott described it as a "ghastly homage."

== Personnel ==
- Glenn Frey – lead vocals, rhythm guitar
- Don Henley – drums, background vocals
- Bernie Leadon – lead guitar, background vocals
- Randy Meisner – bass, background vocals

== Charts ==
Chart (1974)	Peak position
Canada Top Singles (RPM)	56
US Billboard Hot 100	77
