= The Sad Café =

1979 song by the Eagles

Song by Eagles

from the album The Long Run
- Released: September 24, 1979
- Genre: Rock
- Length: 5:35
- Label: Asylum
- Songwriters: Don Henley; Glenn Frey; Joe Walsh; JD Souther
- Producer: Bill Szymczyk

"The Sad Café" is a song written by Don Henley, Glenn Frey, Joe Walsh and JD Souther that first appeared on the Eagles' 1979 album The Long Run. The song was inspired by the many hours spent by Souther at the Troubadour nightclub in Los Angeles.

== Lyrics and music ==
"The Sad Café" is a "slow, gentle" song that expresses nostalgia for the past. Uncut contributor Anderson described it as "an elegaic ballad whose supply of grace provides a welcome counterbalance to the rancour elsewhere on the album." Souther stated that the song was based on "a real place and still a favorite restaurant – Dan Tana's – where for years we huddled in the back booth and schemed, dreamed and laughed more than seems possible." It is also based on the band members' experiences at the Troubadour nightclub in Los Angeles, the area later designated West Hollywood, California, where the band had played early in their careers. Souther stated that the song is about "losing your innocence, our innocence."

The song looks back at Los Angeles some years earlier when people were optimistic and everything seemed possible for young musicians. But now, a few years later, people were older and seemed bitter and some friends have even died. Henley stated that the song is an acknowledgement that those "glory days" had ended. According to Henley:

We could feel an era passing. The crowd that hung out in the Troubadour and the bands that were performing there were changing. The train tracks that had run down the middle of Santa Monica Boulevard had been ripped out...Those remarkable freewheeling times were receding into the distance.

Frey particularly liked the line "I don't know why fortune smiles on some and lets the rest go free." Music journalist John Van der Kiste felt that the line asks whether fortune is a good thing or a bad thing if it comes before someone is ready to deal with it.

Henley sings the lead vocal. The song contains a multitrack acoustic guitar solo played by Don Felder that Van der Kiste describes as "subdued and very distinctive", and "inspired by a passage on Maria Muldaur's "Midnight at the Oasis". Felder said that this guitar solo is the work he is second most proud of with the Eagles, after "Hotel California". He said "It's only about eight bars long, but I was very happy with the way I was able to take that section and create a six-track harmony that worked."

The title of "The Sad Cafe" came from Carson McCullers' 1951 book The Ballad of the Sad Café. The song was dedicated to John Barrick, who had been the Eagles road manager and a bartender at the Troubadour before he died several years earlier.

== Critical reception ==
AllMusic critic William Ruhlmann praised "The Sad Café", as the only song other than the singles that displayed the Eagles' "usual craftsmanship". Rolling Stone rated it as the Eagles' 20th best song, noting the "smooth jazz arrangement, burnished with a sax solo by David Sanborn. Eagles FAQ author Andrew Vaughan felt it was "almost as good" as "Heartache Tonight" and "shows that Henley's writing was as sharp as ever in a bittersweet lament for the past that's autobiographical and all the more poignant for it. Ultimate Classic Rock critic Nick DeRiso rated "The Sad Cafe" to be the Eagles' 11th best song and 2nd best album closing song, behind only the hit single "Best of My Love", stating that it "sets a template for Henley's subsequent solo career, as he offers a darkly ruminative examination of love lost" and also praised "Don Felder's elegiac, utterly virtuosic turn on guitar." Anderson praised Sanborn's sax solo as "gorgeous" and said that the song ends "with an expression of wistfulness, leaving listeners with the suggestion that this world might be good for something after all, even if that something has long since receded into the mists of time." Van der Kiste considered it to be a "thoughtful song", but said that "as a performance, it becomes rather bland, easy-listening fare, if pleasant enough, verging uncomfortably close to the 'smarmy cocktail music' category."

"The Sad Café" was included on several Eagles' compilation albums, including Eagles Greatest Hits Volume 2, Selected Works: 1972–1999 and The Very Best Of.
