= Already Gone (Eagles song) =

Single by Eagles

from the album On the Border
- B-side: "Is It True"
- Released: April 19, 1974
- Recorded: 1974
- Genre: Hard rock; country rock; folk rock
- Length: 4:13 (album version); 3:39 (single version)
- Label: Asylum
- Songwriters: Jack Tempchin; Robb Strandlund
- Producer: Bill Szymczyk

Eagles singles chronology
"Outlaw Man" (1973)	"Already Gone" (1974)	"James Dean" (1974)

Official audio
- "Already Gone" (2013 Remaster) on YouTube

"Already Gone" is a song recorded by the American rock band the Eagles for their 1974 album On the Border. It was written by Jack Tempchin and Robb Strandlund and produced by Bill Szymczyk.

The song was the first single released from On the Border and peaked at No. 32 on the Billboard Hot 100. Since then, the Eagles have included it in their greatest hits albums and live performances.

== Background ==
"Already Gone", which is four minutes and 13 seconds long, was written by Robb Strandlund and Jack Tempchin. In the liner notes for The Very Best Of, Glenn Frey said that Tempchin sent him a tape of the song through the mail. Tempchin had already written one of the Eagles' previous singles, "Peaceful Easy Feeling".

"Already Gone" was one of the first songs that the Eagles recorded for the album after they stopped recording in London and returned to Los Angeles, and switched their producer from Glyn Johns to Bill Szymczyk. Frey was the lead vocalist. New guitarist Don Felder played a Les Paul Special and provided the song's solo lick.

== Release ==
"Already Gone" is the opening track of the Eagles' album On the Border, which was released by Asylum Records on March 22, 1974. It was released as the first single from the album in April 1974. Its b-side was "Is It True".

The song has also been included on some of the Eagles' compilation albums, including Their Greatest Hits (1971–1975) and The Very Best Of.

=== Critical reception ===
Cash Box said that this was the Eagles' "best single release to date" calling it a "hard rocker driven by the group's incredible harmonies." Record World said that "one particular loneliness analogy here warrants repeating: 'And you'll have to eat your lunch all by yourself,'" and said that the song was "the act's best since 'Take It Easy.'" "Already Gone" has been described as a "classic". In his book To the Limit: The Untold Story of the Eagles, Marc Eliot wrote that the song "was an out-and-out rocker ... Musically it sounded like a fuel-injected rave-up, with melodic echoes of both 'Peaceful Easy Feeling' and 'Take It Easy.' In 2017, Billboard ranked the song number nine on their list of the 15 greatest Eagles songs, and in 2019, Rolling Stone ranked the song number six on their list of the 40 greatest Eagles songs.

=== Chart performance ===
The song was a "staple" on AM and FM radio. It peaked at #32 on the Billboard Hot 100 on June 29, 1974, spending three weeks on the American Top 40, and a total of 15 weeks on the chart.

== Live performances ==
The Eagles have included "Already Gone" in their live performances since the 1970s. It was one of their "best selections" at a 1979 Michigan show, according to one reviewer. At a 2002 concert in Washington, the song created a "frenzy," with the audience singing along. A performance was included on the 2005 Farewell 1 Tour DVD, which was filmed in Australia. In 2006, the band played the song in Manchester, and Frey delivered it "with humour and passion."

== Personnel ==
- Glenn Frey – lead vocals, guitar solos
- Don Henley – drums, background vocals
- Bernie Leadon – guitar, background vocals
- Randy Meisner – bass, background vocals
- Don Felder – guitar solos

== Track listing ==
7"

1. "Already Gone"
2. "Is It True"

== Charts ==
Chart (1974)	Peak position
Canada Top Singles (RPM)	12
US Billboard Hot 100	32

== Other versions ==
- "Already Gone" was recorded by Tanya Tucker for the 1993 tribute album Common Thread: The Songs of the Eagles. It reached No. 75 on the Billboard Country chart. Rolling Stone's Kara Manning wrote that Tucker's version "transforms its male bravado into a feminist battle cry."
- The song was recorded by Wilson Phillips for their 2004 album California.
- The Finnish rendering "Alan Sooloilemaan" was recorded by Karma (Finnish band)) for their 1977 album Morjens.
