= List of Black Sabbath and Heaven & Hell members =

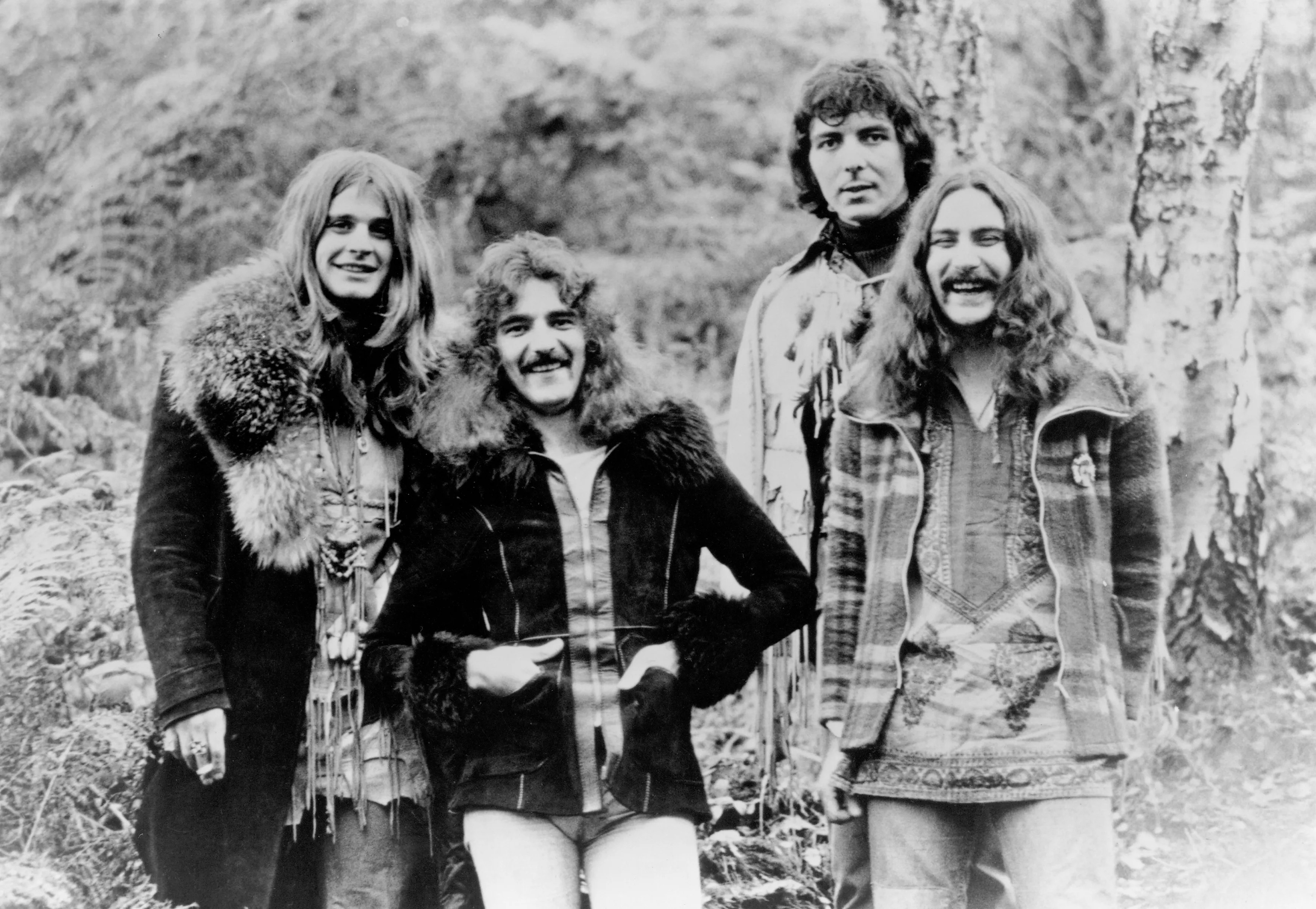
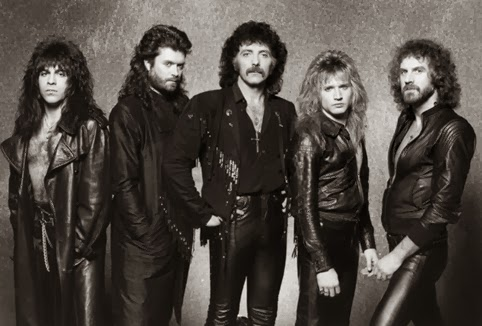
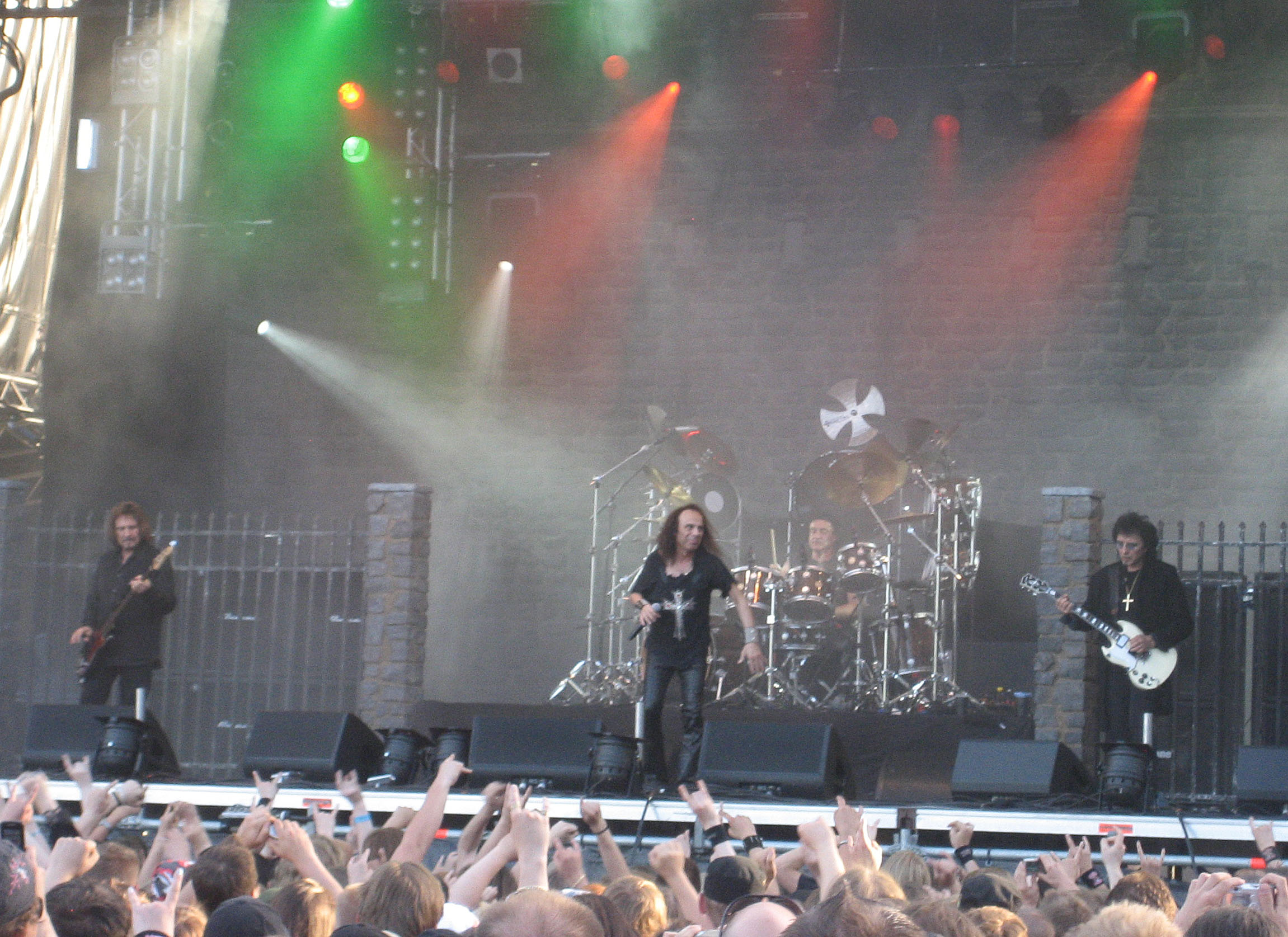
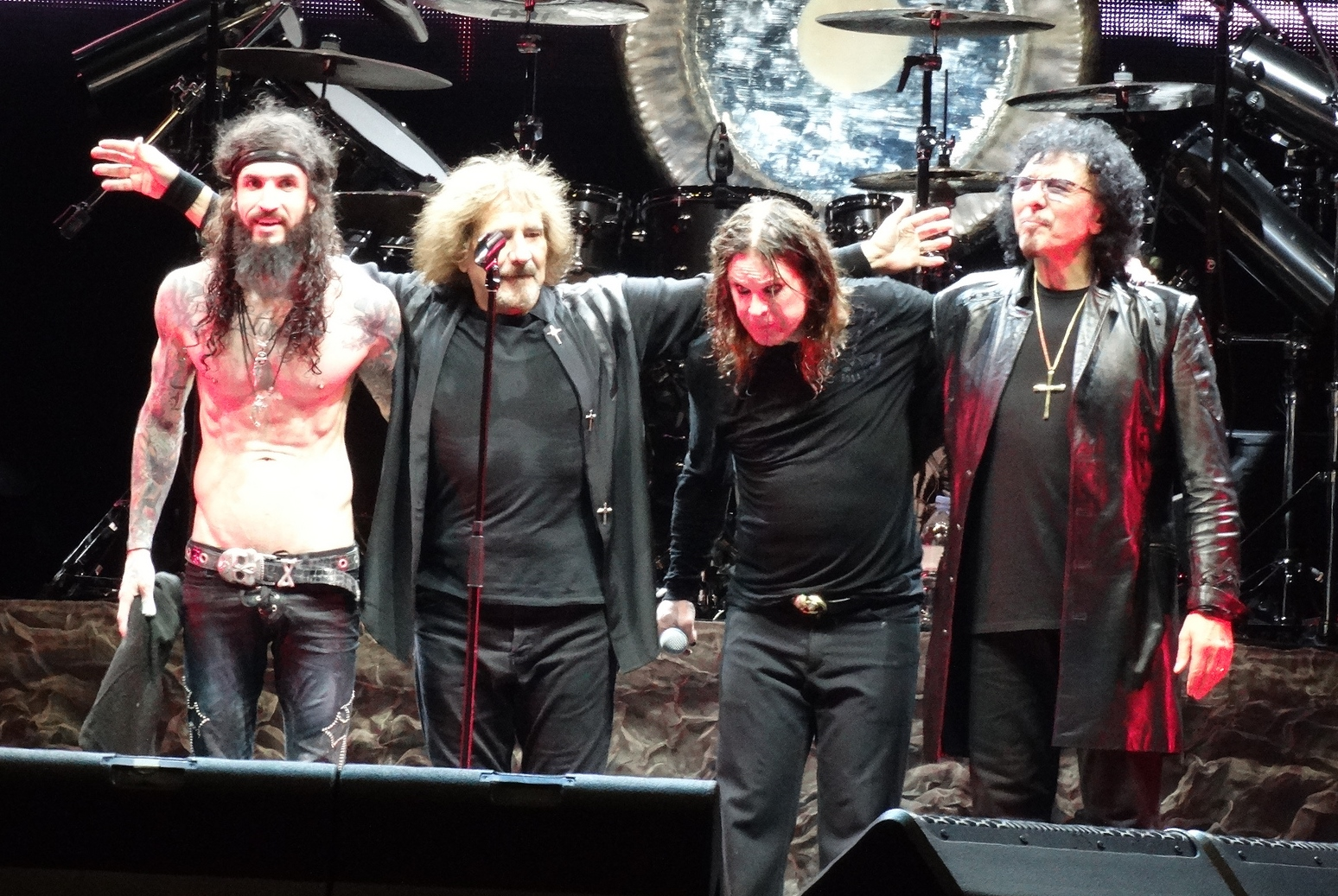
Four lineups of Black Sabbath and Heaven & Hell: 1973, 1986, 2007, and 2013.

Black Sabbath were an English heavy metal band from Aston, Birmingham. Formed in September 1968 under the initial name Earth, the group's first lineup included lead vocalist Ozzy Osbourne, guitarist Tony Iommi, bassist Geezer Butler and drummer Bill Ward. They changed their name to Black Sabbath in August 1969 and the lineup remained stable until April 1979, when Osbourne was fired. Subsequently, the band went through numerous personnel changes over the years, with Iommi remaining the only constant member. The original lineup reunited in 2011, although Ward soon exited and was replaced on tour by Tommy Clufetos until the band's retirement in 2017.

In 2006 Ronnie James Dio, Iommi, Butler, and Ward reunited as Heaven & Hell, a band which focused on performing Dio-era Black Sabbath music. The new name was intended to differentiate between the Osbourne and Dio-era lineups. Ward was soon replaced by Vinny Appice. Heaven & Hell released one studio album, The Devil You Know, before Dio died of stomach cancer on 16 May 2010. The original line-up reunited for a final show for both the band and Osbourne as a solo artist, titled Back to the Beginning, at Villa Park on 5 July 2025. Osbourne died a few weeks after their final performance.

== History ==
=== 1968–1985 ===
Black Sabbath formed in 1968, taking members from two other local bands – guitarist Tony Iommi and drummer Bill Ward from Mythology, and vocalist Ozzy Osbourne and bassist Geezer Butler from Rare Breed. Initially known as The Polka Tulk Blues Band, the group's name was changed in September 1968 to Earth, before they became Black Sabbath in August 1969 after being confused with another British act of the same name. After seven commercially and critically successful albums, Osbourne left abruptly in September 1977 to pursue a solo career. He was replaced by Dave Walker, although by the following January he had returned to the band. After one more album, Never Say Die!, Osbourne was fired on 27 April 1979, due to his reliance on alcohol and other drugs, and his reluctance to work on a new album.

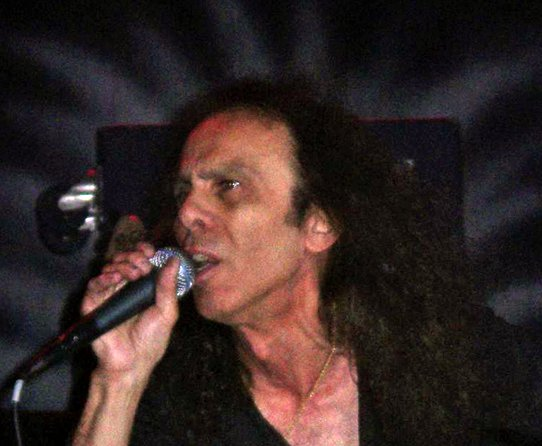
Ronnie James Dio replaced original vocalist Ozzy Osbourne in 1979, and initially recorded two studio albums.

Osbourne was replaced by former Rainbow vocalist Ronnie James Dio in June 1979. Butler chose to leave shortly after his arrival, with Geoff Nicholls taking his place in mid-July before Dio's former bandmate Craig Gruber joined and Nicholls moved to keyboards and guitar, during this time Dio also played bass. Recording began with Gruber, but Butler returned in November and performed all bass parts on Heaven and Hell. Ward abruptly left partway through the album's promotional tour after a show on 19 August 1980, with Vinny Appice enlisted to take his place from 31 August. In November 1982, after disagreements over the mixing of Live Evil, Dio and Appice left Black Sabbath and formed Dio together. The following February, the band replaced Dio with former Deep Purple frontman Ian Gillan, and brought back original drummer Ward.

After recording Born Again, Ward was forced to leave again in the summer of 1983 due to his continuing problems with alcohol abuse. He was replaced for the Born Again Tour by Electric Light Orchestra drummer Bev Bevan. Gillan departed after the tour. He was briefly replaced by former Steeler vocalist Ron Keel, although this was short-lived due to disagreements between the band and their new producer Spencer Proffer, which saw plans for a new album fall through. The planned album with Proffer and Keel included four songs written by the band Kick Axe, and the songs ended up recorded and released by W.A.S.P. and King Kobra. After Keel, a newly sober Ward returned to the band and they briefly worked with David "Donut" Donato on vocals. However, this also failed to result in a new album or tour dates, Butler left in response to the personnel changes, and the band remained inactive until the following year. Iommi subsequently began working on a planned solo album in early 1985.

=== 1985–1997 ===
For his planned solo album, Iommi began working with bassist Gordon Copley and drummer Eric Singer, then members of Lita Ford's backing band (Iommi's fiancée at the time). After a few months, Copley returned to working with Ford, and Dave Spitz was brought in as his replacement. On 13 July 1985, the original lineup of Black Sabbath reunited for a one-off appearance at Live Aid, performing the songs "Children of the Grave", "Iron Man" and "Paranoid". Iommi then returned to working on his solo album, for which he enlisted former Trapeze and Deep Purple vocalist Glenn Hughes in July. However, after pressure from his American record label Warner Bros. Records, Iommi was forced to credit Seventh Star to "Black Sabbath featuring Tony Iommi" upon its release in January 1986.

Returning on the Seventh Star Tour under the original moniker, the band were forced into another change of vocalist on 26 March 1986, when Hughes suffered an injury in a fight with manager John Downey which left him unable to sing. He was replaced by Ray Gillen, who debuted on 29 March. During the production of their next album, The Eternal Idol, the lineup of Black Sabbath changed multiple times – first, Bob Daisley replaced Spitz on 30 September 1986, before leaving on 11 November after completing his bass parts; next, Singer left on 1 January 1987, with his drum parts completed; and finally, Tony Martin replaced Gillen on 1 March. Around the time of Martin's arrival, Bevan also returned to the band. Preparing for shows in July, the band briefly rehearsed with original bassist Butler, although within a few days he had left again and Spitz was brought back in his place. Bevan left after one show, objecting to upcoming dates at Sun City, South Africa, and was replaced for the shows by Terry Chimes.

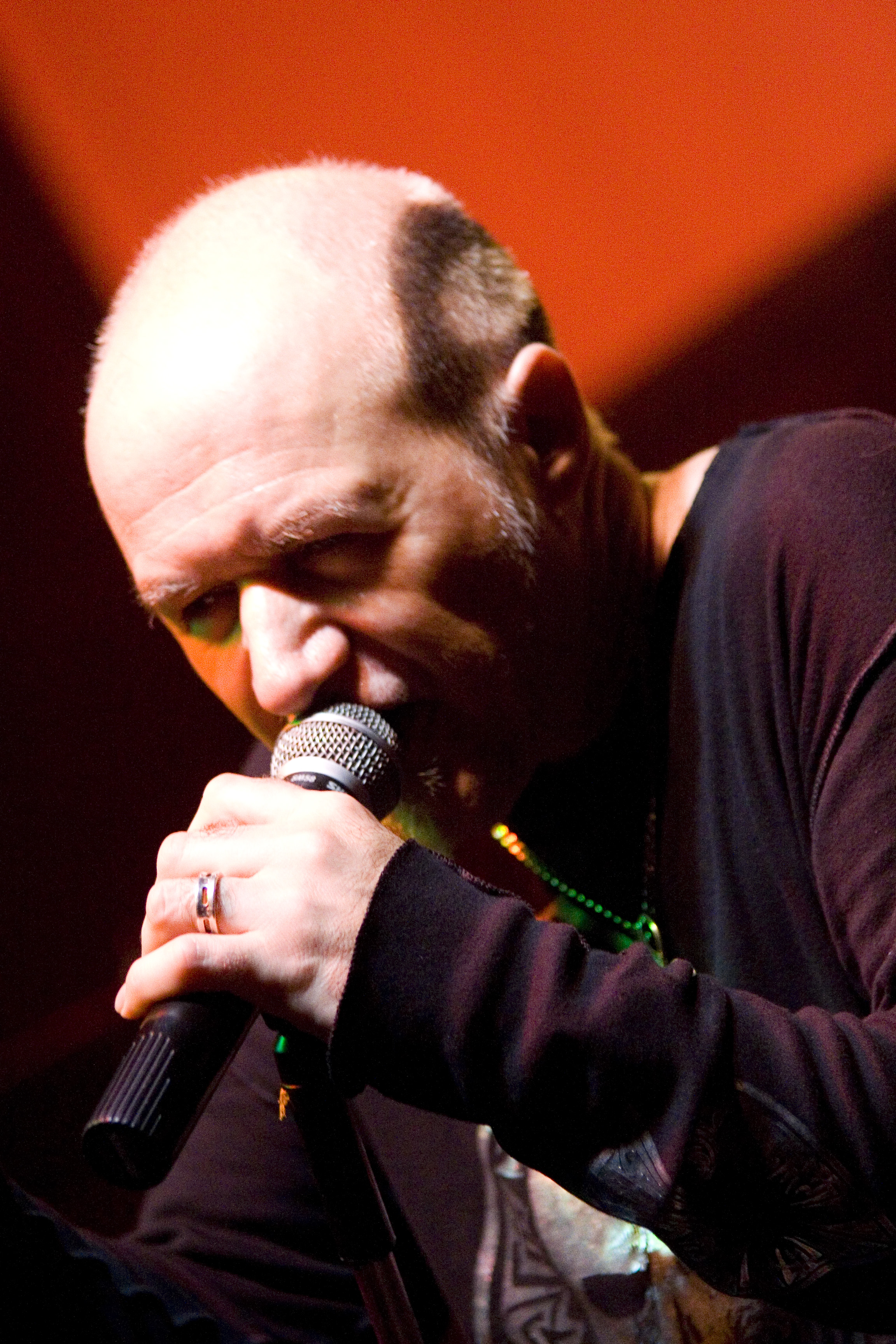
Tony Martin joined in 1987, and went on to become the second longest-serving vocalist in the band's history.

After the Sun City shows, Spitz left the band again on 15 August 1987; he was later replaced by Jo Burt on 1 October. Burt remained a member early the next year, but had left by the time the band played a charity show on 29 May 1988, at which Nicholls filled in on bass. By August, the band had started work on new album Headless Cross with drummer Cozy Powell and session bassist Laurence Cottle. Butler was slated to return for the subsequent touring cycle, but he ultimately joined Osbourne's solo band and instead Neil Murray was hired in May 1989. This lineup remained stable for more than a year, releasing Tyr in 1990 and touring until the end of the year.

After the tour in promotion of Tyr, Butler returned to the band. Despite rumours of an original reunion lineup, it was Dio who took over from Martin on vocals in January 1991. Within a few months, however, Martin was reinstated after Dio and Iommi disagreed over the vocalist's desire to bring back Vinny Appice and reunite the Mob Rules lineup. Dio eventually did return with Appice later in the year, replacing Martin and Cozy Powell respectively, and the lineup released Dehumanizer in 1992. At the end of the resulting tour, however, Dio left after refusing to perform at two shows in November supporting original vocalist Osbourne, who had announced his retirement. Rob Halford, who had recently left Judas Priest, filled in for the dates. After the original lineup reunited onstage at the second show for four songs, plans were set for a full reformation with Osbourne and Ward the next year.

The reunion with Osbourne and Ward ultimately fell through, and in early 1993 the band brought back Martin as frontman. With Appice also gone after the Dehumanizer Tour, the band auditioned drummers and hired Bobby Rondinelli in March. Cross Purposes was released and promoted on a short concert tour in 1994, after which Butler left the band again. Rondinelli was replaced by Ward for the final leg of the tour in South America, but the drummer chose to leave again when Butler departed. Butler and Ward were replaced by returning members Murray and Powell, respectively, marking a reunion of the Tyr lineup. The band toured in promotion of new album Forbidden in 1995, although Powell was replaced by Rondinelli partway through the tour in August. After the conclusion of the tour, Black Sabbath went on hiatus during 1996 as Iommi began work on a new solo album.

=== 1997–2025 ===
In March 1997, the long-awaited reunion of Osbourne, Iommi and Butler was announced for the Ozzfest tour, starting in May. Ward, however, was not invited to join; his place was instead taken by Faith No More drummer Mike Bordin. For a rescheduled show on 1 July, Shannon Larkin of Godsmack took over from Bordin, who was unavailable. Ward eventually returned in November for a pair of shows the following month, which were recorded and released alongside two new studio tracks on Reunion in 1998. A short European tour was scheduled for June 1998, however just before it began Ward suffered a minor heart attack. Appice was brought in to replace him for the shows. Ward returned later in the year, with a tour in support of Reunion taking place in 1999. After another hiatus while members worked on solo projects, Sabbath joined Ozzfest again in 2001, although a later tour was cancelled when Osbourne was ordered by his label Epic Records to complete work on his new album Down to Earth.

After another hiatus, Black Sabbath returned in 2004 with new touring keyboardist Adam Wakeman. Halford reprised his role as substitute vocalist for a show on 26 August, after Osbourne was unable to sing due to bronchitis. More tour dates followed in 2005, including another appearance on the Ozzfest tour, before Iommi began working with Dio in early 2006 on new tracks for an upcoming compilation titled The Dio Years. Butler and Ward were initially named as the rhythm section completing the project. At Iommi's behest, the group rebranded themselves as Heaven & Hell to differentiate this incarnation from the Osbourne-fronted Black Sabbath which was then only on a hiatus. Ward, would later decline to be the band's drummer before they recorded, citing musical differences. By December, the reunion had evolved into a full reformation of the Mob Rules lineup of the band with Appice taking over Ward's duties, the band was joined on tour by Dio keyboardist Scott Warren, taking Nicholls' original role. The band adopted the moniker Heaven & Hell accordingly. During this time, the official lineup of Black Sabbath continued to be Osbourne, Iommi, Butler and Ward, as it was assured by representatives of the band that Heaven & Hell was a separate project.

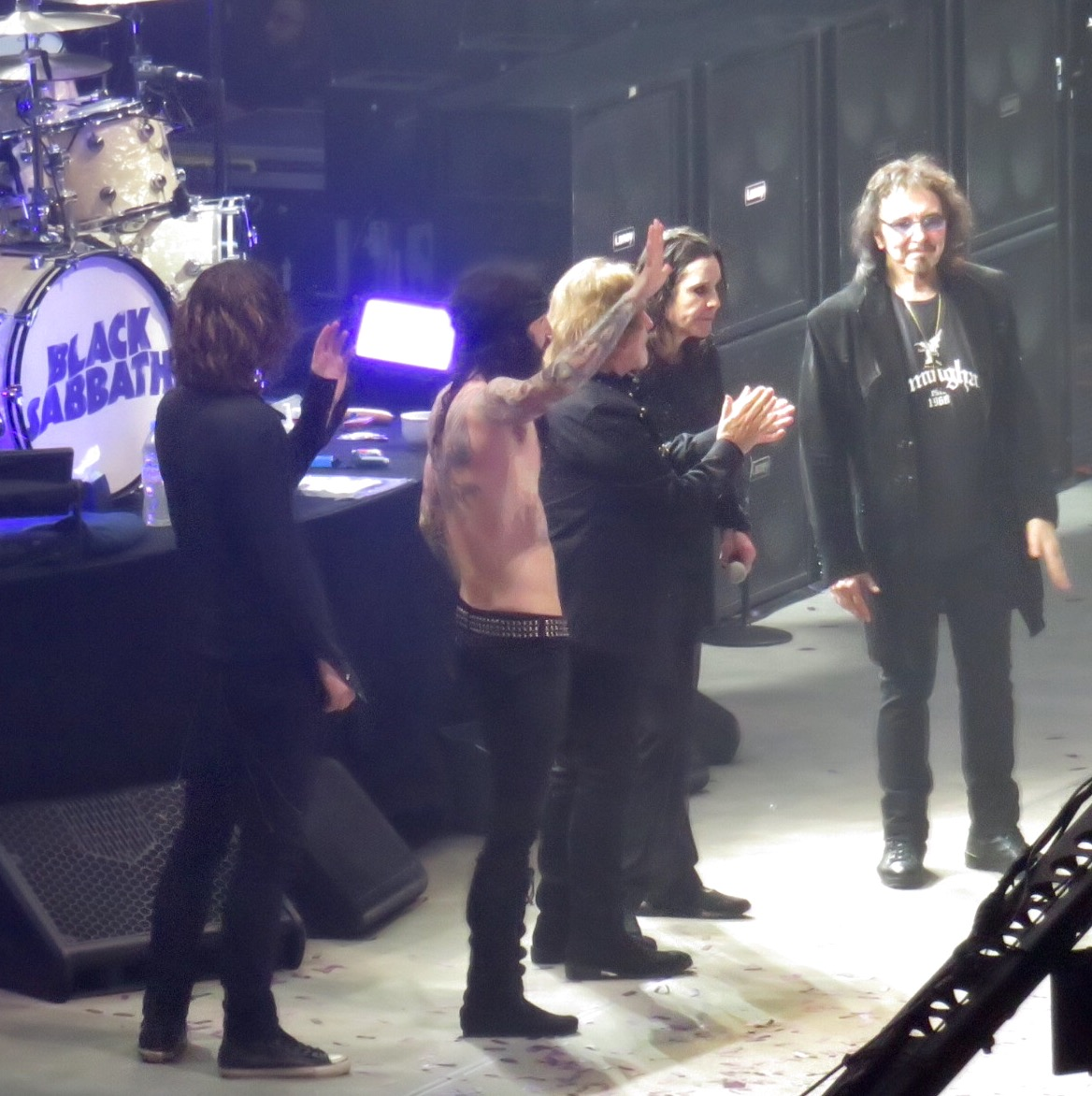
Osbourne, Iommi and Butler released 13 in 2013, and completed The End Tour in 2017 with Tommy Clufetos on drums and Adam Wakeman on keyboards.

Heaven & Hell released their only studio album, The Devil You Know, and remained active until Dio died of stomach cancer on 16 May 2010, on 24 July 2010 Jorn Lande and a returning Glenn Hughes performed with Iommi, Butler, Appice and Warren at the Dio Tribute Concert. On 11 November 2011, the original lineup announced at a press conference that they would be reuniting for their first studio album since 1978, as well as an accompanying concert tour. However, on 3 February 2012, Ward announced that he would not be joining his bandmates unless he received a "signable contract ... that reflects some dignity and respect toward me as an original member of the band". The drummer confirmed his departure in May, after failing to reach an agreement that suited him. Five days after the announcement, the band played their first live show since 2005 in Birmingham, with Tommy Clufetos – the drummer in Osbourne's solo band – in place of Ward.

Former Rage Against the Machine and Audioslave drummer Brad Wilk was enlisted to perform on new album 13, which was released in June 2013. Clufetos remained for the album's promotional touring cycle. On 3 September 2015, it was announced that the band would embark on a tour dubbed The End throughout 2016 and 2017, which would serve as their "farewell tour". Another studio album was initially announced in 2014, however this was later scrapped. The final studio recordings released by the band were four outtakes from the 13 sessions, which were issued alongside four live recordings on the EP The End in January 2016. The final Black Sabbath show took place on 4 February 2017 at the Genting Arena in Birmingham, which was recorded for The End of the End documentary film and The End: Live in Birmingham album and video release. On 7 March 2017, Black Sabbath's disbandment was officially confirmed.

On 5 July 2025, the band played their final show at Villa Park, Birmingham with the original line-up of Iommi, Ward, Butler and Osbourne. Osbourne died on 22 July 2025.

== Band members ==
=== Members ===
Image	Name	Years active	Instruments	Release contributions
	Tony Iommi	1968–2017; 2025	guitars; keyboards (1971–1976, 2012–2013); backing vocals (1978) • bagpipes (1973); harp (1975); occasional flute	All Black Sabbath and Heaven & Hell releases
	Bill Ward	1968–1980; 1982–1983; 1984; 1994; 1997–1998; 1998–2004; 2004–2006; 2011–2012; 2025 (one-off shows in 1985 and 1992)	drums; percussion; occasional lead vocals (1976–1977); backing vocals (1975, 1978); piano (1975)	All Black Sabbath releases from Black Sabbath (1970) to Live at Last (1980); Born Again (1983); Reunion (1998); The Last Supper (1999); Past Lives (2002)
	Terence "Geezer" Butler	1968–1979; 1979–1984; 1987; 1990–1994; 1997–2017; 2025 (one-off show in 1985)	bass; occasional synthesizers (1972–1976); backing vocals (1978)	All Black Sabbath releases from Black Sabbath (1970) to Born Again (1983); Dehumanizer (1992); Cross Purposes (1994); Cross Purposes Live (1995); All Black Sabbath and Heaven & Hell releases from Reunion (1998) onwards
	John "Ozzy" Osbourne	1968–1977; 1978–1979; 1997–2006; 2011–2017; 2025 (one-off shows in 1985 and 1992) (died 2025)	lead vocals; harmonica; tambourine; synthesizer (1973)	All Black Sabbath releases from Black Sabbath (1970) to Never Say Die! (1978); Live at Last (1980); Reunion (1998); The Last Supper (1999); Past Lives (2002); All Black Sabbath releases from 13 (2013) onwards
	Dave Walker	1977–1978	lead vocals; harmonica; tambourine	none
	Ronnie James Dio	1979–1982; 1991; 1991–1992; 2006–2010 (until his death)	lead vocals; bass (1979)	Heaven and Hell (1980); Black and Blue (1980); Mob Rules (1981); Live Evil (1982); Dehumanizer (1992); All Black Sabbath and Heaven & Hell releases from The Dio Years (2007) – three new studio recordings to Neon Nights: 30 Years of Heaven & Hell (2010)
	Geoff Nicholls	1979–1985 (session/touring); 1985–1997 (official); 1998–2004 (official; died 2017)	keyboards; guitar; bass (1979, 1988)	All releases from Heaven and Hell (1980) to The Last Supper (1999); Live at Hammersmith Odeon (2007)
	Craig Gruber	1979 (died 2015)	bass	none
	Vinny Appice	1980–1982; 1991–1992; 1998; 2006–2010	drums	Black and Blue (1980); Mob Rules (1981); Live Evil (1982); Dehumanizer (1992); All Black Sabbath and Heaven & Hell releases from The Dio Years (2007) – three new studio recordings to Neon Nights: 30 Years of Heaven & Hell (2010)
	Ian Gillan	1982–1984	lead vocals	Born Again (1983)
	Bev Bevan	1983–1984; 1987	drums; percussion	The Eternal Idol (1987) – percussion on "Scarlet Pimpernel" and "Eternal Idol" only; Born Again reissue bonus live tracks (2011)
	Ron Keel	1984	lead vocals	none
	David Donato	1984 (died 2021)	lead vocals	none
	Eric Singer	1985–1987	drums	Seventh Star (1986); The Eternal Idol (1987)
	Jeff Fenholt	1985 (died 2019)	vocals	none
	Gordon Copley	1985	bass	Seventh Star - "No Stranger to Love" only (1986)
	Dave Spitz	1985–1986; 1987	bass	Seventh Star (1986)
	Glenn Hughes	1985–1986 (substitute for one-off show in 2010)	lead vocals	Seventh Star (1986)
	Ray Gillen	1986–1987 (died 1993)	lead vocals	Seventh Star reissue bonus live tracks (2010); The Eternal Idol reissue "Ray Gillen Session" bonus studio tracks (2011)
	Tony Martin	1987–1991; 1991; 1992–1997	lead vocals	All Black Sabbath releases from The Eternal Idol (1987) to Forbidden (1995), except Dehumanizer (1992)
	Cozy Powell	1988–1991; 1994–1995 (died 1998)	drums; percussion	Headless Cross (1989); Tyr (1990); Forbidden (1995)
	Neil Murray	1988–1990; 1994–1997	bass	Tyr (1990); Forbidden (1995)
	Bobby Rondinelli	1993–1994; 1995–1997	drums	Cross Purposes (1994); Cross Purposes Live (1995)

== Touring and session musicians ==
Image	Name	Years active	Instruments	Release contributions
	Rick Wakeman	1973 (session)	keyboards; piano; synthesizers	Sabbath Bloody Sabbath (1973) – "Sabbra Cadabra" only
	Jezz Woodroffe	1975–1976 (session/touring)	keyboards; piano; synthesizers	Technical Ecstasy (1976) · Past Lives (2002) – Ashbury Park, NJ tracks only · Sabotage Super Deluxe bonus live tracks (2021)
	Don Airey	1978 (session)	keyboards; piano; synthesizers	Never Say Die! (1978)
	Jon Elstar	1978 (session)	harmonica	Never Say Die! (1978) – "Swinging the Chain" only
	Bob Daisley	1986 (session)	bass	The Eternal Idol (1987)
	Terry Chimes	1987–1988 (touring)	drums	none
	Jo Burt	1987 (touring)	bass	none
	Laurence Cottle	1988 (session)	bass	Headless Cross (1989)
	Brian May	1988 (session)	lead guitar	Headless Cross (1989) – "When Death Calls" only
	Ice-T	1994 (session)	additional vocals	Forbidden (1995) – "The Illusion of Power" only
	Mike Bordin	1997 (touring); 2004 (touring)	drums	none
	Adam Wakeman	2004–2006 (touring); 2011–2017 (touring)	keyboards	Live... Gathered in Their Masses (2013); The End (2016) – live tracks only; The End: Live in Birmingham (2017)
	Scott Warren	2006–2010 (touring)	keyboards	Live from Radio City Music Hall (2007); Neon Nights: 30 Years of Heaven & Hell (2010)
	Mike Exeter	2008 (session)	keyboards; engineer; production	The Devil You Know (2009) – keyboards; 13 (2013) – production
	Tommy Clufetos	2012 (touring); 2013–2017 (touring)	drums	Live... Gathered in Their Masses (2013); The End (2016) – live tracks only; The End: Live in Birmingham (2017)
	Brad Wilk	2012–2013 (session)	drums	13 (2013); The End (2016)

=== Substitutes ===
Image	Name	Years active	Instruments	Details
	Rob Halford	1992; 2004	lead vocals	Halford substituted for Dio for two shows in November 1992 and for Osbourne at one show on 26 August 2004.
	Shannon Larkin	1997	drums	Larkin substituted for Bordin, who was unavailable, at a rescheduled Ozzfest show on 1 July 1997.
	Jørn Lande	2010	lead vocals	Lande and Glenn Hughes performed with Iommi, Butler and Appice at the Dio Tribute Concert on 24 July 2010.

== Line-ups ==
Period	Members	Releases
December 1968 – October 1977 (Earth until August 1969, Black Sabbath afterwards)	Ozzy Osbourne – vocals, harmonica, occasional synthesizers; Tony Iommi – guitars, keyboards; Geezer Butler – bass, synthesizers; Bill Ward – drums, occasional vocals	Black Sabbath (1970); Paranoid (1970); Master of Reality (1971); Vol. 4 (1972); Sabbath Bloody Sabbath (1973); Sabotage (1975); Technical Ecstasy (1976); Live at Last (1980); Past Lives (2002)
October 1977 – January 1978	Dave Walker – vocals; Tony Iommi – guitars; Geezer Butler – bass; Bill Ward – drums	none
January 1978 – April 1979	Ozzy Osbourne – lead vocals; Tony Iommi – guitars, backing vocals; Geezer Butler – bass, backing vocals; Bill Ward – drums, occasional vocals	Never Say Die! (1978); Never Say Die! VHS/DVD (1978)
April – July 1979	Ronnie James Dio – vocals; Tony Iommi – guitars; Geezer Butler – bass; Bill Ward – drums	none
July 1979	Ronnie James Dio – vocals, bass; Tony Iommi – guitars; Bill Ward – drums	none
July – August 1979	Ronnie James Dio – vocals; Tony Iommi – guitars; Geoff Nicholls – bass; Bill Ward – drums	none
August – November 1979	Ronnie James Dio – vocals; Tony Iommi – lead guitar; Craig Gruber – bass; Geoff Nicholls – keyboards, rhythm guitar (session/touring); Bill Ward – drums	none
November 1979 – August 1980	Ronnie James Dio – vocals; Tony Iommi – guitars; Geezer Butler – bass; Geoff Nicholls – keyboards (session/touring); Bill Ward – drums	Heaven and Hell (1980)
August 1980 – December 1982	Ronnie James Dio – vocals; Tony Iommi – guitars; Geezer Butler – bass; Geoff Nicholls – keyboards (session/touring); Vinny Appice – drums	Black and Blue VHS (1981); Mob Rules (1981); Live Evil (1982); Live at Hammersmith Odeon (2007)
December 1982 – July 1983	Ian Gillan – vocals; Tony Iommi – lead guitar; Geezer Butler – bass; Geoff Nicholls – keyboards, rhythm guitar (session/touring); Bill Ward – drums	Born Again (1983)
July 1983 – March 1984	Ian Gillan – vocals; Tony Iommi – lead guitar; Geezer Butler – bass; Geoff Nicholls – keyboards, rhythm guitar (session/touring); Bev Bevan – drums	none
March – April 1984	Ron Keel – vocals; Tony Iommi – lead guitar; Geezer Butler – bass; Geoff Nicholls – keyboards, rhythm guitar (session/touring); Bev Bevan – drums	none
April – late 1984	David Donato – vocals; Tony Iommi – lead guitar; Geezer Butler – bass; Geoff Nicholls – keyboards, rhythm guitar (session/touring); Bill Ward – drums	none
January – May 1985	Jeff Fenholt – vocals; Tony Iommi – lead guitar; Gordon Copley – bass; Geoff Nicholls – keyboards, bass, rhythm guitar; Eric Singer – drums	none
13 July 1985 (Live Aid)	Ozzy Osbourne – lead vocals; Tony Iommi – guitars, backing vocals; Geezer Butler – bass; Bill Ward – drums	none
July 1985 – March 1986	Glenn Hughes – vocals; Tony Iommi – lead guitar; Dave Spitz – bass; Geoff Nicholls – keyboards, rhythm guitar; Eric Singer – drums	Seventh Star (1986)
March – October 1986	Ray Gillen – vocals; Tony Iommi – lead guitar; Dave Spitz – bass; Geoff Nicholls – keyboards, rhythm guitar; Eric Singer – drums	none
October 1986 – March 1987	Ray Gillen – vocals; Tony Iommi – lead guitar; Bob Daisley – bass (session); Geoff Nicholls – keyboards, bass, rhythm guitar; Eric Singer – drums	The Eternal Idol (1987) – Gillen's lead vocals were not included on the final album
March – July 1987	Tony Martin – vocals; Tony Iommi – lead guitar; Geezer Butler – bass; Geoff Nicholls – keyboards, rhythm guitar; Bev Bevan – drums, percussion	The Eternal Idol (1987) – Martin's lead vocals and Bevan's percussion overdubbed onto the previous line-up's instrumentation
July 1987	Tony Martin – vocals; Tony Iommi – lead guitar; Dave Spitz – bass; Geoff Nicholls – keyboards, rhythm guitar; Bev Bevan – drums	none
July – August 1987	Tony Martin – vocals; Tony Iommi – lead guitar; Dave Spitz – bass; Geoff Nicholls – keyboards, rhythm guitar; Terry Chimes – drums (touring)	none
November – December 1987	Tony Martin – vocals; Tony Iommi – lead guitar; Jo Burt – bass (touring); Geoff Nicholls – keyboards, bass, rhythm guitar; Terry Chimes – drums (touring)	none
29 May 1988 (one-off show)	Tony Martin – vocals; Tony Iommi – guitar; Geoff Nicholls – bass; Terry Chimes – drums	none
August – November 1988	Tony Martin – vocals; Tony Iommi – lead guitar; Laurence Cottle – bass (session); Geoff Nicholls – keyboards, bass, rhythm guitar; Cozy Powell – drums	Headless Cross (1989)
November 1988 – November 1990	Tony Martin – vocals; Tony Iommi – lead guitar; Neil Murray – bass; Geoff Nicholls – keyboards, rhythm guitar; Cozy Powell – drums	Tyr (1990)
November 1990 – January 1991	Tony Martin – vocals; Tony Iommi – lead guitar; Geezer Butler – bass; Geoff Nicholls – keyboards, rhythm guitar; Cozy Powell – drums	none
January – March 1991	Ronnie James Dio – vocals; Tony Iommi – lead guitar; Geezer Butler – bass; Geoff Nicholls – keyboards, rhythm guitar; Cozy Powell – drums	none
March – mid-1991	Tony Martin – vocals; Tony Iommi – lead guitar; Geezer Butler – bass; Geoff Nicholls – keyboards, rhythm guitar; Cozy Powell – drums	none
Mid-1991 – November 1992	Ronnie James Dio – vocals; Tony Iommi – lead guitar; Geezer Butler – bass; Geoff Nicholls – keyboards, rhythm guitar; Vinny Appice – drums	Dehumanizer (1992)
November 1992	Rob Halford – vocals (substitute for Dio); Tony Iommi – lead guitar; Geezer Butler – bass; Geoff Nicholls – keyboards, rhythm guitar; Vinny Appice – drums	none
15 November 1992 (one-off show)	Ozzy Osbourne – vocals; Tony Iommi – guitars; Geezer Butler – bass; Bill Ward – drums	none
March 1993 – August 1994	Tony Martin – vocals; Tony Iommi – lead guitar; Geezer Butler – bass; Geoff Nicholls – keyboards, rhythm guitar; Bobby Rondinelli – drums	Cross Purposes (1994); Cross Purposes Live (1995); Cross Purposes Live VHS (1995)
August – September 1994	Tony Martin – vocals; Tony Iommi – lead guitar; Geezer Butler – bass; Geoff Nicholls – keyboards, rhythm guitar; Bill Ward – drums	none
September 1994 – August 1995	Tony Martin – vocals; Tony Iommi – lead guitar; Neil Murray – bass; Geoff Nicholls – keyboards, rhythm guitar; Cozy Powell – drums	Forbidden (1995)
August 1995 – January 1997	Tony Martin – vocals; Tony Iommi – lead guitar; Neil Murray – bass; Geoff Nicholls – keyboards, rhythm guitar; Bobby Rondinelli – drums	none
March – June 1997	Ozzy Osbourne – vocals; Tony Iommi – lead guitar; Geezer Butler – bass; Geoff Nicholls – keyboards; Mike Bordin – drums (touring)	none
1 July 1997 (one-off show)	Ozzy Osbourne – vocals; Tony Iommi – lead guitar; Geezer Butler – bass; Geoff Nicholls – keyboards; Shannon Larkin – drums (substitute for Bordin)	none
November – December 1997	Ozzy Osbourne – vocals; Tony Iommi – lead guitar; Geezer Butler – bass; Geoff Nicholls – keyboards; Bill Ward – drums	Reunion (1998) – live tracks
December 1997 – May 1998	Ozzy Osbourne – vocals; Tony Iommi – guitars; Geezer Butler – bass; Bill Ward – drums	Reunion (1998) – studio tracks
May 1998	Ozzy Osbourne – vocals; Tony Iommi – lead guitar; Geezer Butler – bass; Geoff Nicholls – keyboards; Bill Ward – drums	none
May – June 1998	Ozzy Osbourne – vocals; Tony Iommi – lead guitar; Geezer Butler – bass; Geoff Nicholls – keyboards; Vinny Appice – drums	none
July 1998 – April 2004	Ozzy Osbourne – vocals; Tony Iommi – lead guitar; Geezer Butler – bass; Geoff Nicholls – keyboards; Bill Ward – drums	The Last Supper DVD (1999)
May – June 2004	Ozzy Osbourne – vocals; Tony Iommi – lead guitar; Geezer Butler – bass; Adam Wakeman – keyboards (touring); Mike Bordin – drums (touring)	none
June – 26 August 2004	Ozzy Osbourne – vocals; Tony Iommi – lead guitar; Geezer Butler – bass; Adam Wakeman – keyboards (touring); Bill Ward – drums	none
27 August 2004	Rob Halford – vocals (substitute for Osbourne); Tony Iommi – lead guitar; Geezer Butler – bass; Adam Wakeman – keyboards (touring); Bill Ward – drums	none
28 August 2004 – March 2006	Ozzy Osbourne – vocals; Tony Iommi – lead guitar; Geezer Butler – bass; Adam Wakeman – keyboards (touring); Bill Ward – drums	none
Black Sabbath enters a hiatus and Heaven & Hell forms, March 2006 – July 2010
March – December 2006	Ronnie James Dio – vocals; Tony Iommi – guitars; Geezer Butler – bass; Bill Ward – drums	none
December 2006 – March 2007	Ronnie James Dio – vocals; Tony Iommi – lead guitar; Geezer Butler – bass; Vinny Appice – drums	The Dio Years (2007) – three new tracks
March 2007 – November 2008	Ronnie James Dio – vocals; Tony Iommi – lead guitar; Geezer Butler – bass; Scott Warren – keyboards (touring); Vinny Appice – drums	Live from Radio City Music Hall (2007); Live from Radio City Music Hall DVD (2007)
November 2008	Ronnie James Dio – vocals; Tony Iommi – lead guitar; Geezer Butler – bass; Mike Exeter – keyboards (session); Vinny Appice – drums	The Devil You Know (2009)
November 2008 – 16 May 2010	Ronnie James Dio – vocals; Tony Iommi – lead guitar; Geezer Butler – bass; Scott Warren – keyboards (touring); Vinny Appice – drums	Neon Nights: 30 Years of Heaven & Hell (2010); Neon Nights: 30 Years of Heaven & Hell DVD (2010)
24 July 2010 (Ronnie James Dio Tribute Concert)	Glenn Hughes – vocals; Jørn Lande – vocals; Tony Iommi – lead guitar; Geezer Butler – bass; Scott Warren – keyboards; Vinny Appice – drums	none
Heaven & Hell disbands; Black Sabbath still on hiatus until November 2011
November 2011 – February 2012	Ozzy Osbourne – vocals; Tony Iommi – guitars; Geezer Butler – bass; Bill Ward – drums	none
February – mid-2012	Ozzy Osbourne – vocals; Tony Iommi – lead guitar; Geezer Butler – bass; Adam Wakeman – keyboards (touring); Tommy Clufetos – drums (touring)	none
Mid-2012 – early 2013	Ozzy Osbourne – vocals; Tony Iommi – lead guitar; Geezer Butler – bass; Brad Wilk – drums (session)	13 (2013); The End (2016) – studio tracks
Early 2013 – March 2017	Ozzy Osbourne – vocals; Tony Iommi – lead guitar; Geezer Butler – bass; Adam Wakeman – keyboards (touring); Tommy Clufetos – drums (touring)	Live... Gathered in Their Masses DVD/Blu-ray (2013); The End (2016) – live tracks; The End: Live in Birmingham (2017); The End: Live in Birmingham DVD/Blu-ray (2017)
Band Inactive March 2017 – July 2025
5 July 2025 (Back to the Beginning)	Ozzy Osbourne – vocals; Tony Iommi – guitars; Geezer Butler – bass; Bill Ward – drums	none

== Bibliography ==
- Keel, Ron (28 January 2014), Even Keel: Life on the Streets of Rock & Roll, Pennsauken, New Jersey: BookBaby, ISBN 978-1619277939
- Larkin, Colin (27 May 2011), The Encyclopedia of Popular Music, London, England: Omnibus Press, ISBN 978-0857125958
- McIver, Joel (15 October 2016), The Complete History of Black Sabbath: What Evil Lurks, New York City, New York: Race Point Publishing, ISBN 978-1631062728
- Popoff, Martin (1 May 2011), Black Sabbath FAQ: All That's Left to Know on the First Name in Metal, Milwaukee, Wisconsin: Backbeat Books, ISBN 978-0879309572
- Stolz, Nolan (8 November 2017), Experiencing Black Sabbath: A Listener's Companion, Lanham, Maryland: Rowman & Littlefield, ISBN 978-1442256910
- Wade, Chris (15 October 2013), The Music of Black Sabbath, Morrisville, North Carolina: Lulu.com, ISBN 978-1291589955
