= The Ultimate Collection (Black Sabbath album) =

2016 compilation album by Black Sabbath

Greatest hits album by Black Sabbath
- Released: 28 October 2016
- Recorded: 1969–1978
- Genre: Heavy metal
- Length: 150:14
- Label: BMG

Black Sabbath chronology
The End (2016)	The Ultimate Collection (2016)	The End: Live in Birmingham (2017)

The Ultimate Collection is a greatest hits album by the English heavy metal band Black Sabbath, first released on 28 October 2016. Remastered by engineer Andy Pearce and curated by the members of the band, the album was released during the band's final concert tour, The End Tour.

== Release ==
The Ultimate Collection was released on CD and digital platforms on 28 October 2016. This was followed on 18 November with the limited edition "Crucifold" box set release, which contains four vinyl LPs and folds out into the shape of a cross. The CD and LP releases were made available in the United States in February 2017.

== Reception ==
Leigh Sanders of Express & Star gave the album a positive review, calling it "[a] great collection." Ulf Kubanke of Laut.de also reviewed the album positively, complimenting the songs and the sound quality.

== Track listing ==
Disc one
No.	Title	Original release	Length
1.	"Paranoid"	Paranoid, 1970	2:48
2.	"Never Say Die"	Never Say Die!, 1978	3:50
3.	"Iron Man"	Paranoid	5:54
4.	"Black Sabbath"	Black Sabbath, 1970	6:17
5.	"Children of the Grave"	Master of Reality, 1971	5:14
6.	"Fairies Wear Boots"	Paranoid	6:13
7.	"Changes"	Vol. 4, 1972	4:42
8.	"Rat Salad"	Paranoid	2:29
9.	"Sweet Leaf"	Master of Reality	5:03
10.	"War Pigs"	Paranoid	7:54
11.	"Sabbath Bloody Sabbath"	Sabbath Bloody Sabbath, 1973	5:47
12.	"Hole in the Sky" (fade out edit)	Sabotage, 1975	4:00
13.	"Symptom of the Universe"	Sabotage	6:28
14.	"Spiral Architect"	Sabbath Bloody Sabbath	5:29
15.	"Rock 'n' Roll Doctor"	Technical Ecstasy, 1976	3:26
Total length:			75:34

Disc two
No.	Title	Original release	Length
1.	"Dirty Women"	Technical Ecstasy	7:08
2.	"Evil Woman"	Black Sabbath	3:22
3.	"A Hard Road"	Never Say Die!	6:04
4.	"Lord of This World"	Master of Reality	5:22
5.	"Into the Void"	Master of Reality	6:12
6.	"Behind the Wall of Sleep"	Black Sabbath	3:38
7.	"Snowblind"	Vol. 4	5:26
8.	"Tomorrow's Dream"	Vol. 4	3:08
9.	"The Wizard"	Black Sabbath	4:20
10.	"N.I.B."	Black Sabbath	6:04
11.	"Electric Funeral"	Paranoid	4:49
12.	"Embryo"	Master of Reality	0:27
13.	"Killing Yourself to Live"	Sabbath Bloody Sabbath	5:42
14.	"Am I Going Insane (Radio)"	Sabotage	4:16
15.	"Wicked World"	Black Sabbath	4:43
16.	"It's Alright"	Technical Ecstasy	3:59
Total length:			74:40

== Charts ==
Chart (2016)	Peak position
Australian Albums (ARIA)	113
Belgian Albums (Ultratop Wallonia)	176
French Albums (SNEP)	141
German Albums (Offizielle Top 100)	40
Scottish Albums (OCC)	20
Spanish Albums (PROMUSICAE)	45
Swiss Albums (Schweizer Hitparade)	52
UK Albums (OCC)	20
UK Independent Albums (OCC)	4
UK Rock & Metal Albums (OCC)	3
US Top Hard Rock Albums (Billboard)	13
US Indie Store Album Sales (Billboard)	17

Chart (2025)	Peak position
Croatian International Albums (HDU)	34
Irish Albums (OCC)	29
UK Albums (OCC)	14

== Certifications ==
Region	Certification	Certified units/sales
United Kingdom (BPI)	Gold	100,000^{‡}
^{‡} Sales+streaming figures based on certification alone.
