= The End: Live in Birmingham =

Live album by Black Sabbath
- Released: 17 November 2017
- Recorded: 4 February 2017
- Venue: Genting Arena (Birmingham, England)
- Genre: Heavy metal
- Length: 108:06
- Label: Eagle Vision
- Producer: Jeremy Azis

Black Sabbath chronology
The Ultimate Collection (2016)	The End: Live in Birmingham (2017)	Anno Domini 1989–1995 (2024)

Professional ratings
Review scores
Source	Rating
AllMusic	3.5/5 stars
Metal Hammer	4.5/5 stars

The End: Live in Birmingham is a live album by the English heavy metal band Black Sabbath. It features the final performance from their farewell concert tour, known as The End Tour, recorded at Genting Arena in Birmingham, England, on 4 February 2017. Performing at the show and on the album are founding Black Sabbath members Ozzy Osbourne, Tony Iommi, and Geezer Butler. They performed with session drummer Tommy Clufetos filling in for the band's original drummer, Bill Ward, as well as keyboardist and guitarist Adam Wakeman.

The End: Live in Birmingham was released on 17 November 2017, preceded by a concert film, Black Sabbath: The End of the End, which was released on 28 September. The album was released through Eagle Vision, as a CD, DVD, Blu-ray, vinyl record and a limited deluxe box set.

== Background ==
The film documents the final full Black Sabbath show, held at the Genting Arena in the band's hometown of Birmingham, England, on 4 February 2017.

In addition to the live concert, both the film and album feature "The Angelic Sessions" – five songs recorded in the days following the band's final show. These tracks are the band's final studio recordings.

== Tracklist ==
All songs written by Geezer Butler, Tony Iommi, Ozzy Osbourne and Bill Ward.

No.	Title	Original album	Length
1.	"Black Sabbath"	Black Sabbath (1970)	7:26
2.	"Fairies Wear Boots"	Paranoid (1970)	6:28
3.	"Under the Sun/Every Day Comes and Goes"	Vol. 4 (1972)	7:04
4.	"After Forever"	Master of Reality (1971)	6:26
5.	"Into the Void"	Master of Reality	7:07
6.	"Snowblind"	Vol. 4	6:39
7.	"Band Intros"	n/a	1:32
8.	"War Pigs"	Paranoid	8:32
9.	"Behind the Wall of Sleep"	Black Sabbath	3:32
10.	"Bassically/N.I.B."	Black Sabbath	6:36
11.	"Hand of Doom"	Paranoid	7:05
12.	"Supernaut" / "Sabbath Bloody Sabbath" / "Megalomania" (instrumental medley)	Vol. 4 / Sabbath Bloody Sabbath (1973) / Sabotage (1975)	3:28
13.	"Rat Salad" / "Drum Solo"	Paranoid	8:32
14.	"Iron Man"	Paranoid	7:53
15.	"Dirty Women"	Technical Ecstasy (1976)	8:22
16.	"Children of the Grave"	Master of Reality	6:33
17.	"Paranoid"	Paranoid	4:46
Total length:			1:47:57

=== "The Angelic Sessions" ===
No.	Title	Original album	Length
1.	"The Wizard"	Black Sabbath	4:05
2.	"Wicked World"	Black Sabbath	4:43
3.	"Sweet Leaf"	Master of Reality	5:17
4.	"Tomorrow's Dream"	Vol. 4	3:10
5.	"Changes"	Vol. 4	5:00

== Personnel ==
Black Sabbath

- Tony Iommi – guitars
- Geezer Butler – bass
- Ozzy Osbourne – vocals

Additional musicians

- Adam Wakeman – keyboards
- Tommy Clufetos – drums

Production

- Mike Exeter – mixing, mastering

== Charts ==
Album charts

Chart (2017)	Peak position
Austrian Albums (Ö3 Austria)	13
Belgian Albums (Ultratop Flanders)	30
Belgian Albums (Ultratop Wallonia)	27
Dutch Albums (Album Top 100)	79
Finnish Albums (Suomen virallinen lista)	11
French Albums (SNEP)	153
German Albums (Offizielle Top 100)	2
Italian Albums (FIMI)	72
Norwegian Albums (VG-lista)	20
Spanish Albums (Promusicae)	56
Scottish Albums (Official Charts)	57
Swedish Albums (Sverigetopplistan)	18
Swiss Albums (Schweizer Hitparade)	14
UK Albums (Official Charts)	68
UK Rock & Metal Albums (Official Charts)	3
US Top Hard Rock Albums (Billboard)	13
US Top Rock Albums (Billboard)	43
US Indie Store Album Sales (Billboard)	10

Video charts

Chart (2017)	Peak position
Dutch Videos	7
Swiss Videos	1

== Certifications ==
Region	Certification	Certified units/sales
Poland (ZPAV)	Gold	10,000^{‡}
^{‡} Sales+streaming figures based on certification alone.
