= Black Sabbath: The End of the End =

2017 concert documentary film

- Theatrical release poster
- Directed by: Dick Carruthers
- Produced by: Jeremy Azis
- Starring: Ozzy Osbourne; Tony Iommi; Geezer Butler
- Cinematography: Eugene O'Connor
- Edited by: Tim Woolcott
- Production company: Eagle Rock Films
- Distributed by: Trafalgar Releasing
- Release date: September 2017
- Running time: 94 minutes
- Country: United Kingdom
- Language: English

Black Sabbath: The End of the End is a 2017 concert documentary film about the English heavy metal band Black Sabbath, performing the final show of their farewell concert tour, known as The End Tour. The performance took place at the Genting Arena in Birmingham, England, on 4 February 2017, and features founding Black Sabbath members Ozzy Osbourne, Tony Iommi and Geezer Butler, with session drummer Tommy Clufetos filling in for the band's original drummer, Bill Ward. The film also features footage of "The Angelic Sessions"—the band's final studio recordings, recorded in the days following the final show.

Directed by Dick Carruthers and produced by Eagle Rock Films, Black Sabbath: The End of the End was released in theatres on 28 September 2017, as a one-night-only event. It was followed by an accompanying live album, The End: Live in Birmingham.

== Synopsis ==
The film documents the English heavy metal band Black Sabbath's final show of their farewell concert tour, The End Tour. The performance was held at the Genting Arena in Birmingham, England, hometown of the band's founding members: vocalist Ozzy Osbourne, guitarist Tony Iommi, bassist Geezer Butler, and drummer Bill Ward. Osbourne, Iommi, and Butler performed this final concert with session drummer Tommy Clufetos in place of Ward, as well as Adam Wakeman on keyboards and guitar.

The concert opens with a performance of the song "Black Sabbath". The film goes on to show the band performing "Fairies Wear Boots", "Under the Sun/Every Day Comes and Goes", "Into the Void", "Snowblind", "War Pigs", "Hand of Doom", "Iron Man", and "Children of the Grave"; at the end of the setlist, the band performs the song "Paranoid" as an encore.

Interspersed with the final concert are interviews with Osbourne, Iommi, and Butler, in which they talk about their careers and past drug addictions. Additionally, Iommi's 2012 lymphoma diagnosis, which impacted the band's 2012–14 reunion tour and the recording of their 2013 album 13, is discussed. The film also features footage of "The Angelic Sessions"—the band's final studio recordings, which took place in the days following the final show. Of these recordings, the film shows Osbourne, Iommi, and Butler performing "The Wizard", "Wicked World", and "Changes".

== Release ==
Black Sabbath: The End of the End was released in theatres on 28 September 2017 as a one-night-only event, screening in 1,500 cinemas worldwide. It was followed by the release of a live album of the songs performed during the final concert; titled The End: Live in Birmingham, the album was released on 17 November. By the following year, the film was made available for streaming on Showtime.

== Reception ==
Terry Staunton of the Radio Times gave the film a score of three out of five stars, concluding: "Despite decades of ups-and-downs, estrangements and full-on animosity, there remains a strong bond between the players, although they're perhaps too polite when writing this last chapter." Total Film's Kevin Harley gave the film four out of five stars, writing that, "Between Ozzy Osbourne's cracked clown persona and the bluff address of some genuinely moving material, the veterans present winningly earthy faces." Benjamin H. Smith of Decider called the film "a compelling document of heavy metal's lions in winter", and wrote that "it shows a group whose powers have begun to wane under the ravages of time heroically rising to the occasion and often displaying all the majesty of what they were at their peak."

== See also ==
- The Black Sabbath Story, Vol. 1 and Vol. 2 — documentaries about Black Sabbath's career
