= Past Lives (Black Sabbath album) =

Live album by Black Sabbath
- Released: 20 August 2002
- Recorded: 1970–1975
- Genre: Heavy metal
- Length: 117:01
- Label: Sanctuary
- Producer: Black Sabbath

Black Sabbath chronology
| The Best of Black Sabbath (2000) | Past Lives (2002) | Symptom of the Universe: The Original Black Sabbath 1970–1978 (2002) |

Professional ratings
Review scores
| Source | Rating |
|---|---|
| AllMusic | 3/5 stars |
| Rolling Stone | 3/5 stars |

Past Lives is a live album released in 2002 by the English heavy metal band Black Sabbath. It peaked at number 114 on the Billboard 200. The first disc was previously known as Live at Last, an album not put out by Black Sabbath's record company, and therefore not an official Black Sabbath album. The second consists of recordings made for television and radio, previously only available on bootlegs. It was released as a digipak and later a standard jewel-case.

== Track listing ==
All songs written by Ozzy Osbourne, Tony Iommi, Geezer Butler and Bill Ward.

=== Disc one ===
Tracks 1–5 were recorded at the Hardrock in Manchester, England on 11 March 1973. Tracks 6–9 were recorded at the Rainbow Theatre in London, England, on 16 March 1973.

1. "Tomorrow's Dream" – 3:03
2. "Sweet Leaf" – 5:26
3. "Killing Yourself to Live" – 5:29
4. "Cornucopia" – 3:57
5. "Snowblind" – 4:46
6. "Embryo / Children of the Grave" – 4:33
7. "War Pigs" – 7:36
8. "Wicked World" (Medley/jam that contains parts of "Into the Void", "Sometimes I'm Happy", "Supernaut" and a drum solo; transitions back into "Wicked World") – 18:55
9. "Paranoid" – 3:14

=== Disc two ===
As with many bootleg releases, tracks 1, 5–9 are miscredited as being from the Olympia Theatre in Paris, France, on 20 December 1970.

In 2016, Warner Brothers/Rhino Records located the original master tapes for this concert for inclusion on the Super Deluxe Edition of Paranoid. It was then officially noted that these tracks (1, 5–9) were actually recorded by RTBF for television at Theatre 140, 140 Avenue Plasky, 1040 Bruxelles (Brussels), Belgium on 3 October 1970.

The entire performance in Brussels was first broadcast on "Pop Shop" by RTBF, Belgium on 21 January 1971 (part one) & 4 April 1971 (part two).

Tracks 2–4 were recorded at the Asbury Park Convention Hall in Asbury Park, New Jersey on 5 August 1975.

1. "Hand of Doom / Rat Salad" – 8:25
2. "Hole in the Sky" – 4:46
3. "Symptom of the Universe" – 4:52
4. "Megalomania" – 9:53
5. "Iron Man" – 6:25
6. "Black Sabbath" – 8:23
7. "N.I.B." – 5:31
8. "Behind the Wall of Sleep" – 5:03
9. "Fairies Wear Boots" – 6:39
- The "deluxe edition" contains the same tracks as the original album.

== Personnel ==
- Tony Iommi – guitars
- Bill Ward – drums
- Ozzy Osbourne – vocals
- Geezer Butler – bass

Liner notes for the 2002 CD booklet were written by Bruce Pilato. Liner notes for the 2010 Deluxe Collector's Edition CD booklet were written by Alex Milas.

== Charts ==
| Chart (2002) | Peak position |
|---|---|
| Japanese Albums (Oricon) | 289 |
| US Billboard 200 | 114 |
