= Live... Gathered in Their Masses =

Live album and film by Black Sabbath
- Released: 26 November 2013
- Recorded: 29 April – 1 May 2013
- Venue: Rod Laver Arena (Melbourne)
- Genre: Heavy metal
- Length: 107:59 (DVD/Blu-ray); 69:11 (CD); 40:24 (Bonus DVD/Blu-ray)
- Label: Vertigo

Black Sabbath chronology
13 (2013)	Live... Gathered in Their Masses (2013)	The End (2016)

Professional ratings
Review scores
Source	Rating
Kerrang!	5/5 stars
Record Collector	3/5 stars
Classic Rock	8/10 stars

Live... Gathered in Their Masses is a live album and film by the English heavy metal band Black Sabbath. It features performances from their 2013 world tour, recorded at Rod Laver Arena in Melbourne, Australia on 29 April and 1 May 2013. It was released 26 November 2013 as a CD, DVD, Blu-ray, and a deluxe box set.

The title is drawn from the opening line of "War Pigs".

== Track listing ==
DVD/Blu-ray

No.	Title	Length
1.	"War Pigs"	8:33
2.	"Into the Void"	6:46
3.	"Loner (Butler, Iommi, Osbourne)"	5:58
4.	"Snowblind"	7:14
5.	"Black Sabbath"	7:44
6.	"Behind the Wall of Sleep"	3:32
7.	"N.I.B."	6:19
8.	"Methademic (Butler, Iommi, Osbourne)"	5:21
9.	"Fairies Wear Boots"	6:34
10.	"Symptom of the Universe (instrumental) / Drum Solo"	7:52
11.	"Iron Man"	7:41
12.	"End of the Beginning (Butler, Iommi, Osbourne)"	8:36
13.	"Children of the Grave"	6:29
14.	"God Is Dead? (Butler, Iommi, Osbourne)"	8:52
15.	"Sabbath Bloody Sabbath (Intro) / Paranoid"	7:02
Total length:		107:59

CD

No.	Title	Length
1.	"War Pigs"	8:12
2.	"Loner"	4:58
3.	"Black Sabbath"	7:56
4.	"Methademic"	5:15
5.	"N.I.B."	6:11
6.	"Iron Man"	7:35
7.	"End of the Beginning"	8:09
8.	"Fairies Wear Boots"	6:59
9.	"God Is Dead?"	9:00
10.	"Sabbath Bloody Sabbath (Intro) / Paranoid"	5:04
Total length:		69:11

Deluxe Box Set Bonus DVD/Blu-ray

No.	Title	Length
1.	"Under the Sun"	4:28
2.	"Dirty Women"	7:19
3.	"Electric Funeral"	5:27
4.	"Interview with Black Sabbath"	15:10
5.	"Showday – Behind the Scenes"	8:31
Total length:		40:24

== Charts ==
Album charts

Chart (2013)	Peak position
Australian Albums (ARIA)	146
French Albums (SNEP)	173
German Albums (Offizielle Top 100)	11
Swiss Albums (Schweizer Hitparade)	92

Video charts

Chart (2013)	Peak position
Austrian Videos	4
Dutch Videos	14
Finnish Videos	1
Swiss Videos	4

== Certifications ==
Region	Certification	Certified units/sales
Brazil (Pro-Música Brasil)	Platinum	30,000^{*}
Canada (Music Canada)	Platinum	10,000^{^}
Poland (ZPAV)	Gold	5,000^{*}
^{*} Sales figures based on certification alone.^{^} Shipments figures based on certification alone.

== Personnel ==
Black Sabbath

- Tony Iommi – guitars
- Geezer Butler – bass
- Ozzy Osbourne – vocals

Additional musicians

- Adam Wakeman – keyboards
- Tommy Clufetos – drums
