= The End Tour =

2016–17 concert tour by Black Sabbath

- Tour by Black Sabbath
- Location: Europe; North America; Oceania; South America
- Associated album: The End
- Start date: 20 January 2016
- End date: 4 February 2017
- Legs: 6
- No. of shows: 81
- Box office: $85 million

Black Sabbath concert chronology
- Black Sabbath Reunion Tour (2012–14); The End Tour (2016–17); Back to the Beginning (2025)

The End Tour was the final concert tour for the English heavy metal band Black Sabbath, featuring founding members Ozzy Osbourne, Tony Iommi and Geezer Butler. They performed on the tour with session drummer Tommy Clufetos filling in for the band's original drummer, Bill Ward, along with keyboardist and guitarist Adam Wakeman. The tour concluded Sabbath's over-four-decade career, and was accompanied by the release of an exclusive EP, The End, which contains leftover tracks from the sessions for the band's final studio album, 13, as well as live tracks from their 2012–2014 reunion tour.

The End Tour consisted of 81 shows across North America, Europe, Oceania, and South America, and grossed a total of $84.8 million. The final concert took place on 4 February 2017, in the band's home city of Birmingham, England. The final show was documented as a concert film, Black Sabbath: The End of the End, and the songs from the final show were released as a live album, The End: Live in Birmingham.

== Background ==
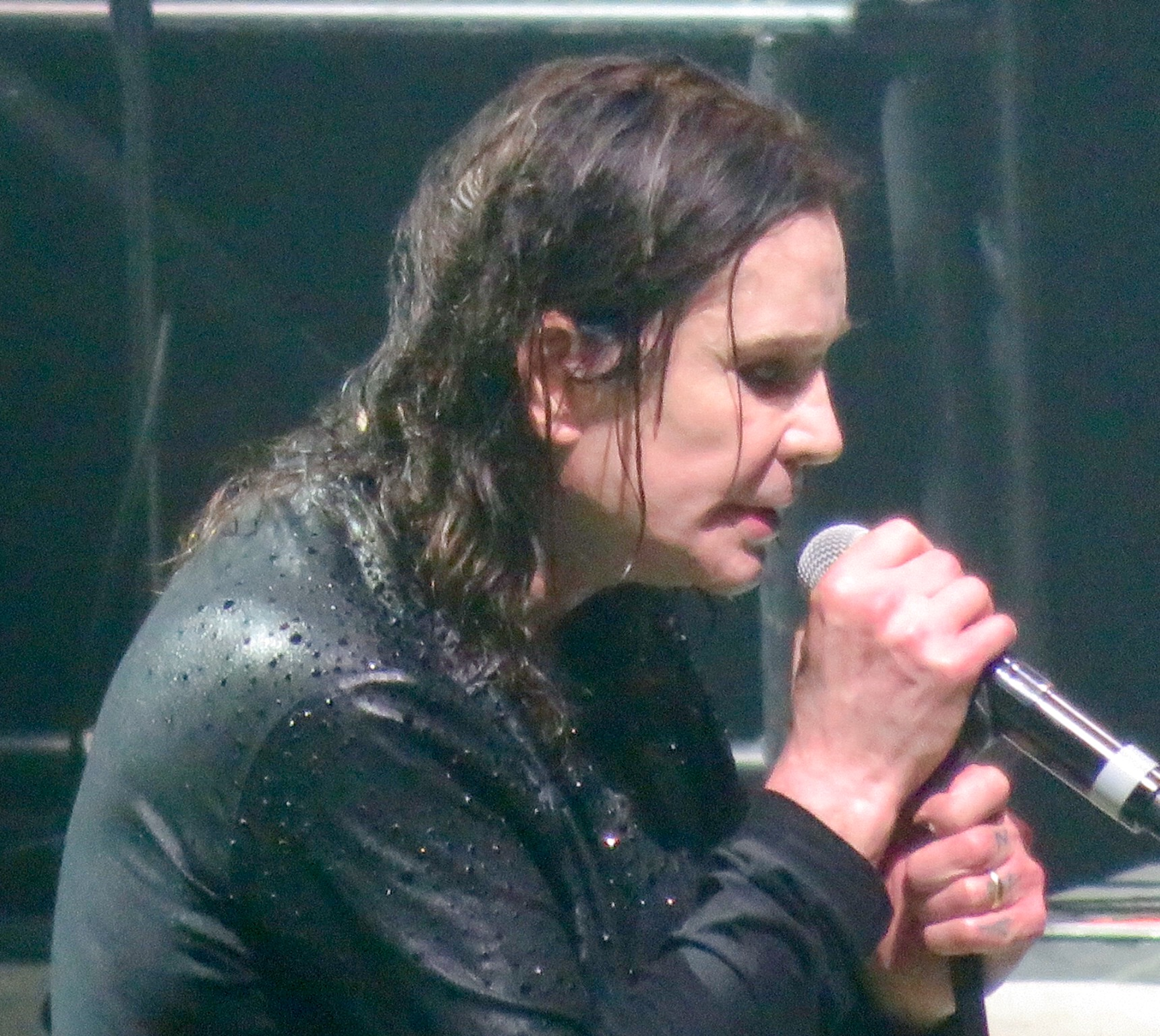
Ozzy Osbourne at the last concert, 4 February 2017, Birmingham

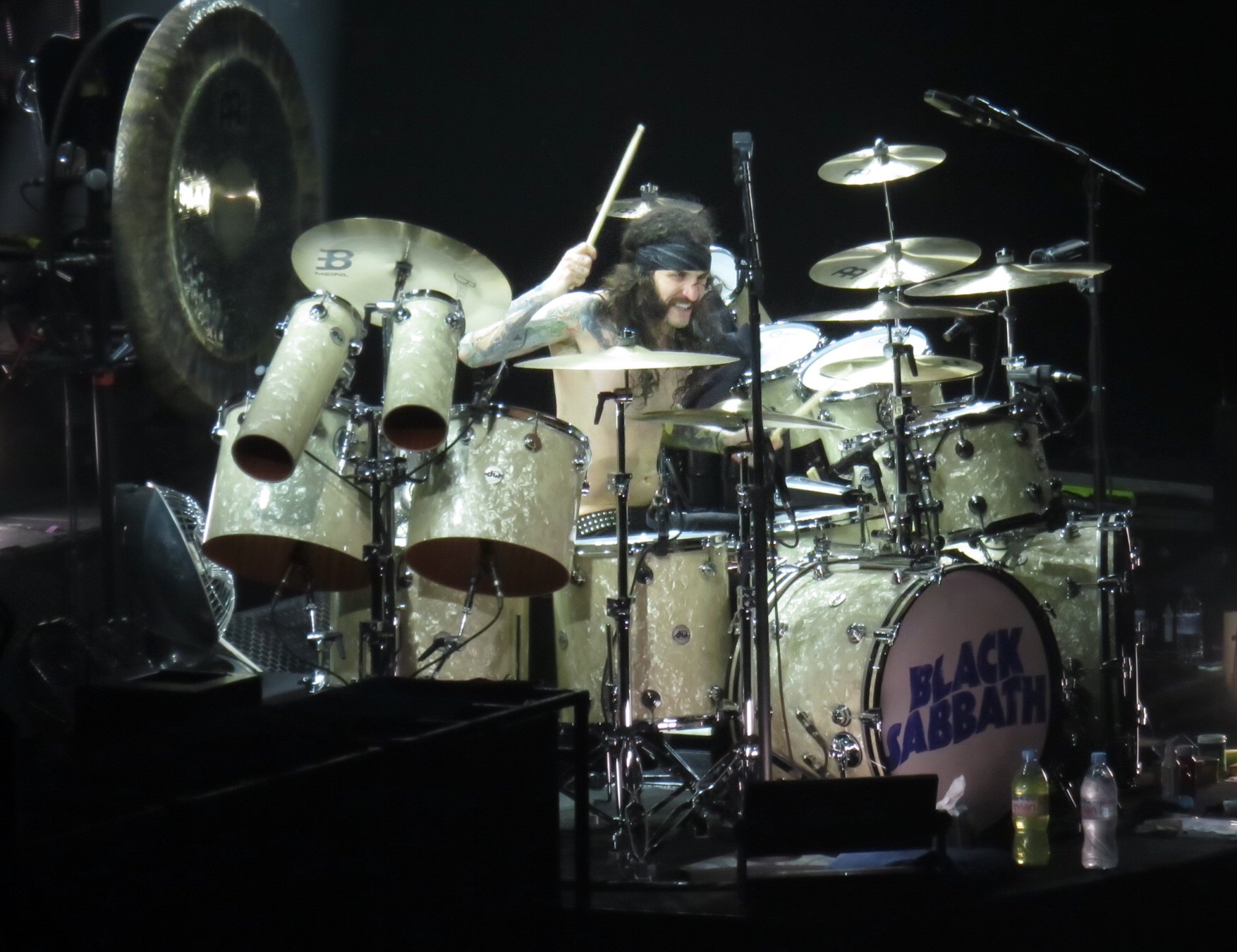
Tommy Clufetos at the last concert, 4 February 2017, Birmingham

Initial dates were announced in a video on the band's YouTube channel on 3 September 2015, with more announced in October 2015. As with the previous tour, Tommy Clufetos filled in for original drummer Bill Ward, due to the latter's departure and animosity towards singer Ozzy Osbourne. An eight-track EP, entitled The End, released to coincide with this tour, was available only at shows.

Rival Sons were the sole support act for all of Black Sabbath's headlining shows. Five Finger Death Punch planned to join the Oceanic leg of the tour, but backed out following the hospitalization of frontman Ivan Moody.

Osbourne said of the farewell tour: "This is it. It's definitely run its course."

The tour concluded in February 2017 with two gigs in the band's native Birmingham. The last was streamed live on the band's Facebook page. "The feeling built as we crept towards the final gig at the Genting Arena," recalled guitarist Tony Iommi, "but it didn't really sink in till the day of the show. Looking out at the audience during the last few songs, people were crying. Those people idolise you and love what you do. In a way, it felt like we were letting them down. It was a shame."

Prior to the gig, Osbourne discussed his emotions, suggesting he would cry after the farewell. He was adamant this was the end, but intended to carry on with solo work, having returned following a 1992 'final' solo tour. Iommi confirmed no more world tours, but remained open to a new album or one-off show. The guitarist had been diagnosed with lymphoma in 2012, and the toll on his health was the main reason to end touring.

Osbourne intended to say something to the crowd but did not prepare a speech. He closed the show with a simple, "Thank you, goodnight, thank you so much."

== Opening acts ==
- Rival Sons
- Volbeat (9 July 2016 in Stockholm, Sweden)
- Bombus (9 July 2016 in Stockholm, Sweden)

== Set list ==
The following set list was performed at the Rogers Arena in Vancouver, Canada, and is not intended to represent all the shows on the tour.

1. "Black Sabbath"
2. "Fairies Wear Boots"
3. "After Forever"
4. "Into the Void"
5. "Snowblind"
6. "War Pigs"
7. "Behind the Wall of Sleep"
8. "Bassically" (Geezer Butler bass solo)
9. "N.I.B."
10. "Hand of Doom"
11. "Rat Salad"
12. Tommy Clufetos drum solo
13. "Iron Man"
14. "Dirty Women"
15. "Embryo"/"Children of the Grave"
  Encore
16. "Paranoid"

== Tour dates ==
List of 2016 concerts, showing date, city, country, venue, attendance and revenue
Date	City	Country	Venue	Attendance	Revenue
20 January 2016	Omaha	United States	CenturyLink Center Omaha	10,317 / 13,681	$875,263
22 January 2016	Chicago	United States	United Center	14,517 / 15,648	$1,525,127
25 January 2016	Minneapolis	United States	Target Center	10,871 / 12,928	$965,445
27 January 2016	Winnipeg	Canada	MTS Centre	—	—
6 February 2016	Tacoma	United States	Tacoma Dome	17,480 / 18,284	$1,465,059
9 February 2016	San Jose	United States	SAP Center	12,226 / 13,533	$1,182,483
11 February 2016	Inglewood	United States	The Forum	14,013 / 14,013	$1,237,836
13 February 2016	Las Vegas	United States	Mandalay Bay Events Center	8,555 / 9,283	$962,808
15 February 2016	Denver	United States	Pepsi Center	12,257 / 14,280	$1,202,717
17 February 2016	Kansas City	United States	Sprint Center	10,715 / 13,115	$868,001
19 February 2016	Auburn Hills	United States	The Palace of Auburn Hills	13,030 / 14,231	$1,204,212
21 February 2016	Hamilton	Canada	FirstOntario Centre	13,575 / 14,287	$1,039,540
23 February 2016	Montreal	Canada	Bell Centre	13,840 / 15,043	$1,079,950
25 February 2016	New York City	United States	Madison Square Garden	29,411 / 29,411	$3,471,530
27 February 2016	New York City	United States	Madison Square Garden	29,411 / 29,411	$3,471,530
2 March 2016	Edmonton	Canada	Rexall Place	—	—
4 March 2016	Calgary	Canada	Scotiabank Saddledome	—	—
7 March 2016	Vancouver	Canada	Rogers Arena	—	—
15 April 2016	Perth	Australia	Perth Arena	7,570 / 7,570	$795,368
17 April 2016	Adelaide	Australia	Adelaide Entertainment Centre	—	—
19 April 2016	Melbourne	Australia	Rod Laver Arena	11,778 / 12,256	$1,273,680
23 April 2016	Sydney	Australia	Qudos Bank Arena	13,717 / 13,717	$1,458,830
25 April 2016	Brisbane	Australia	Brisbane Entertainment Centre	9,623 / 9,623	$1,020,320
28 April 2016	Auckland	New Zealand	Vector Arena	—	—
30 April 2016	Dunedin	New Zealand	Forsyth Barr Stadium	—	—
1 June 2016	Budapest	Hungary	László Papp Budapest Sports Arena	—	—
3 June 2016	Nuremberg	Germany	Rock im Park	—	—
8 June 2016	Berlin	Germany	Waldbühne	—	—
11 June 2016	Castle Donington	England	Download Festival	—	—
13 June 2016	Verona	Italy	Verona Arena	—	—
15 June 2016	Zürich	Switzerland	Hallenstadion	12,017 / 13,000	$1,338,150
17 June 2016	Dessel	Belgium	Graspop Metal Meeting	—	—
19 June 2016	Clisson	France	Hellfest	—	—
23 June 2016	Halden	Norway	Tons of Rock	—	—
25 June 2016	Copenhagen	Denmark	Copenhell	—	—
28 June 2016	Vienna	Austria	Wiener Stadthalle	—	—
30 June 2016	Prague	Czech Republic	O_{2} Arena	—	—
2 July 2016	Kraków	Poland	Tauron Arena Kraków	—	—
5 July 2016	Riga	Latvia	Arēna Rīga	—	—
7 July 2016	Helsinki	Finland	Kaisaniemi Park	—	—
9 July 2016	Stockholm	Sweden	Friends Arena	—	—
12 July 2016	Moscow	Russia	Olympic Stadium	—	—
17 August 2016	Wantagh	United States	Nikon at Jones Beach Theater	—	—
19 August 2016	Camden	United States	BB&T Pavilion	—	—
21 August 2016	Bristow	United States	Jiffy Lube Live	—	—
23 August 2016	Holmdel	United States	PNC Bank Arts Center	—	—
25 August 2016	Mansfield	United States	Xfinity Center	—	—
27 August 2016	Uncasville	United States	Mohegan Sun Arena	7,361 / 7,373	$1,013,384
29 August 2016	Toronto	Canada	Molson Canadian Amphitheatre	—	—
31 August 2016	Clarkston	United States	DTE Energy Music Theatre	—	—
2 September 2016	Noblesville	United States	Klipsch Music Center	—	—
4 September 2016	Tinley Park	United States	Hollywood Casino Amphitheatre	—	—
7 September 2016	Dallas	United States	Gexa Energy Pavilion	—	—
9 September 2016	Albuquerque	United States	Isleta Amphitheater	—	—
11 September 2016	West Valley City	United States	USANA Amphitheatre	—	—
13 September 2016	Ridgefield	United States	Sunlight Supply Amphitheater	—	—
15 September 2016	Oakland	United States	Oracle Arena	10,307 / 12,722	$955,430
17 September 2016	Las Vegas	United States	MGM Grand Garden Arena	10,718 / 11,835	$1,025,145
19 September 2016	Los Angeles	United States	Hollywood Bowl	16,338 / 16,338	$1,573,560
21 September 2016	Phoenix	United States	Ak-Chin Pavilion	13,728 / 19,954	$713,423
24 September 2016	San Bernardino	United States	San Manuel Amphitheater	—	—
8 November 2016	Tulsa	United States	BOK Center	—	—
10 November 2016	Houston	United States	Toyota Center	10,585 / 11,484	$956,628
12 November 2016	San Antonio	United States	AT&T Center	12,405 / 14,316	$1,222,412
16 November 2016	Mexico City	Mexico	Foro Sol	60,506 / 62,423	$2,720,454
19 November 2016	Santiago	Chile	Estadio Nacional	—	—
23 November 2016	Córdoba	Argentina	Orfeo Superdomo	—	—
26 November 2016	Buenos Aires	Argentina	José Amalfitani Stadium	—	—
28 November 2016	Porto Alegre	Brazil	Estacionamento da Fiergs	15,298 / 29,960	$1,079,100
30 November 2016	Curitiba	Brazil	Pedreira Paulo Leminski	22,934 / 25,000	$2,094,680
2 December 2016	Rio de Janeiro	Brazil	Praça da Apoteose	26,764 / 35,000	$2,173,890
4 December 2016	São Paulo	Brazil	Estádio do Morumbi	64,744 / 65,596	$5,502,050

List of 2017 concerts, showing date, city, country, venue, attendance and revenue
Date	City	Country	Venue	Attendance	Revenue
17 January 2017	Cologne	Germany	Lanxess Arena	—	—
20 January 2017	Dublin	Ireland	3Arena	—	—
22 January 2017	Manchester	England	Manchester Arena	14,886 / 15,425	$1,336,720
24 January 2017	Glasgow	Scotland	SSE Hydro	10,029 / 10,955	$930,968
26 January 2017	Leeds	England	First Direct Arena	—	—
29 January 2017	London	England	The O_{2}	30,370 / 35,097	$2,724,560
31 January 2017	London	England	The O_{2}	30,370 / 35,097	$2,724,560
2 February 2017	Birmingham	England	Genting Arena	—	—
4 February 2017	Birmingham	England	Genting Arena	—	—

== Gross ==
The tour grossed $84.8 million, with 1,074,495 tickets sold from 74 shows.

== Personnel ==
- Ozzy Osbourne – vocals
- Tony Iommi – lead guitar
- Geezer Butler – bass guitar

Additional musicians

- Tommy Clufetos – drums and percussion
- Adam Wakeman – keyboards and rhythm guitar
