= The End (EP) =

EP by Black Sabbath
- Released: 20 January 2016
- Recorded: 2012–2014
- Studios: Shangri La Studios (tracks 1–4) (Malibu, California)
- Genre: Heavy metal
- Length: 55:08
- Label: BS Productions Limited
- Producer: Rick Rubin (tracks 1–4)

Black Sabbath chronology
Live... Gathered in Their Masses (2013)	The End (2016)	The Ultimate Collection (2016)

The End is an extended play by the English heavy metal band Black Sabbath and is their final release as a band. It was released on 20 January 2016. The exclusive, limited-edition CD was only available for purchase at tour dates for their final tour The End Tour. The first half of the album is leftover tracks from the 13 sessions and the second half is live tracks recorded on tour between 2013 and 2014.

== Background ==
The band recorded tracks at Shangri-La Studios in Malibu with producer Rick Rubin during the sessions for 13, their nineteenth album. While Sabbath had been planning a follow-up to 13, the album was ultimately scrapped. Guitarist Tony Iommi had written "a whole load of riffs" for the abandoned LP, but bassist "Geezer (Butler) didn't particularly want to do another album." Lead singer Ozzy Osbourne also voiced not wanting to record another album, saying "If we were to do an album before the tour, it would take three or four years to complete the album."

== Release ==
The EP was intended to be promoted with The End Tour, being only available for purchase at live dates. Cover art for the disc was created by OBEY founder and artist Shepard Fairey. The End was placed at number 20 on Rolling Stone's top metal albums of 2016.

== Track listing ==
No.	Title	Length
1.	"Season of the Dead"	7:22
2.	"Cry All Night"	6:58
3.	"Take Me Home"	4:57
4.	"Isolated Man"	5:31
5.	"God Is Dead?" (Live in Sydney, Australia on 27 April 2013)	9:49
6.	"Under the Sun" (Live in Auckland, New Zealand on 20 April 2013)	4:36
7.	"End of the Beginning" (Live in Hamilton, Ontario, Canada on 11 April 2014)	8:09
8.	"Age of Reason" (Live in Hamilton, Ontario, Canada on 11 April 2014)	7:46
Total length:		55:08

== Personnel ==
- Ozzy Osbourne – vocals
- Tony Iommi – guitars
- Geezer Butler – bass

Additional musicians

- Brad Wilk – drums (tracks 1–4)
- Tommy Clufetos – drums (tracks 5–8)
- Adam Wakeman – keyboards (tracks 5–8)

Production

- Mike Exeter – mixing, mastering

== Charts ==
Chart performance for The End
Chart (2026)	Peak position
Japanese Western Albums (Oricon)	25
