= Symptom of the Universe =

1975 song by Black Sabbath

Song by Black Sabbath

from the album Sabotage
- Released: 28 July 1975
- Recorded: Early 1975
- Studio: Morgan, London
- Genre: Heavy metal; thrash metal
- Length: 6:29
- Label: Vertigo
- Songwriters: Geezer Butler; Tony Iommi; Ozzy Osbourne; Bill Ward
- Producers: Black Sabbath; Mike Butcher

"Symptom of the Universe" is a song by English heavy metal band Black Sabbath from their 1975 album Sabotage.

== Overview ==
"Symptom of the Universe" was composed largely by guitarist Tony Iommi, with lyrics by Geezer Butler. Its closing passage, very unlike the rest of the song, evolved from an in-studio jam, created spontaneously in a single day.

Live versions can be heard on the albums Past Lives, Cross Purposes Live and Live... Gathered in Their Masses, as well as the Never Say Die! concert video. It is also the opening track on Ozzy Osbourne's 1982 live album, Speak of the Devil.

"Symptom of the Universe" was ranked the 19th-best Black Sabbath song in the 2013 book Rock - Das Gesamtwerk der größten Rock-Acts im Check.

== Musical style ==
The main riff to "Symptom of the Universe" is considered to be a structural and sonic predecessor to thrash metal, a heavy metal subgenre which emerged in the early 1980s. Tony Iommi said of the song "It starts with an acoustic bit. Then it goes into the up-tempo stuff to give it that dynamic, and it does have a lot of changes to it, including the jam at the end."

== Personnel ==
- Ozzy Osbourne – vocals
- Tony Iommi – electric and acoustic guitars
- Geezer Butler – bass
- Bill Ward – drums, bongos, claves
