= Mike Exeter =

English sound engineer

Mike Exeter is an English sound engineer and record producer who came to prominence via his work with British rock bands Cradle of Filth, Judas Priest Black Sabbath and more.

He is also known for his work with the British guitar player Tony Iommi, being his longstanding creative studio partner.

In 2013 he received a Grammy for his work on the Black Sabbath album 13.

== Discography ==
The Specials

- 1995 - Hypocrite (Engineer)

Ruby Turner

- 1996 - Guilty (Engineer)

Cradle of Filth

- 1996 - Dusk and Her Embrace (Engineer, keyboards)
- 1998 – Cruelty and the Beast (Producer)
- 1999 – From the Cradle to Enslave (Engineer, mixer)
- 2002 – Lovecraft & Witch Hearts (Remixing)
- 2006 – The Cradle of Filth Box Set (Producer, Remixing)

UB40

- 1997 - Guns In The Ghetto (Engineer)

Tony Iommi

- 2004 - The 1996 DEP Sessions (Engineer, Audio Engineering, Main Personnel, Keyboards)
- 2005 - Fused (Engineer, Programming)

Crown of Thorns

- 2005 - Crown Jewels (Engineer)

Ian Gillan

- 2006 - Gillan’s Inn (Engineer, Guitar Engineer)

Black Sabbath

- 2007 - The Dio Years (Engineer, mixing)
- 2013 - 13 (Engineer)
- 2017 - The End DVD (Mixing, Mastering)
- 2017 - The End (Mixing, Mastering)
- 2024 - Forbidden (Remix engineer)

Jeff Beck

- 2007 - Official Bootleg USA ‘06 (Mastering)

Girlschool

- 2008 - Legacy (Engineer)

Various Artists

- 2008 - Heavy Metal Xmas & a Headbanging New Year (Engineer)

Heaven & Hell

- 2009 - The Devil You Know (Producer, Engineer, Audio Engineer)

Sonic Altar

- 2010 - No Sacrifice (Producer, Engineer, Mixing, Keyboards)

WhoCares

- 2010 - Out of My Mind (Engineer, Mixing)

Judas Priest

- 2014 - Redeemer of Souls (Producer, Mixer)
- 2018 – Firepower (Engineer)

Rob Halford

- 2019 - Celestial

Snakecharmer

- 2017 - Second Skin (Mixing, Mastering))

Those Damn Crows

- 2018 - Murder & The Motive (Additional production)

Massive Wagons

- 2018 - Full Nelson (Co-writer of song 'Robot' with additional production)

Dark Embrace

- 2023 - Dark Heavy Metal (Mixing, Mastering)

Orange Goblin

- 2024 – Science, Not Fiction (Producer, Mixer)
