= The Wizard (Black Sabbath song) =

Song by Black Sabbath

- Cover artwork for the Paranoid single, as used in the Netherlands

Single by Black Sabbath

from the album Black Sabbath
- A-side: "Paranoid"
- Released: 24 March 1970 (France)
- Studio: Regent Sounds (London)
- Genre: Heavy metal; blues rock
- Length: 4:24
- Label: Vertigo
- Songwriters: Geezer Butler; Tony Iommi; Ozzy Osbourne; Bill Ward
- Producer: Rodger Bain

Black Sabbath singles chronology
"Evil Woman" (1970)	"The Wizard" (1970)	"Paranoid" (1970)

Audio sample
- file; help

"The Wizard" is a song by the English heavy metal band Black Sabbath from their 1970 album Black Sabbath. "The Wizard" was selected as their debut single in France, backed by "Evil Woman", which was released as A-side in many other countries. It was also the B-side to the 1970 single "Paranoid", which reached number 4 on the UK singles chart and number 61 on the Billboard Hot 100.

== Information ==
"The Wizard" is about a wizard who uses his magic to encourage people he encounters. In a 2005 interview with Metal Sludge, Black Sabbath bassist and lyricist Geezer Butler said the song's lyrics were influenced by the wizard Gandalf from The Lord of the Rings.

== Personnel ==
- Ozzy Osbourne – vocals, harmonica
- Tony Iommi – guitars, slide guitar
- Geezer Butler – bass
- Bill Ward – drums

== Covers and influence ==
The song was covered by Bullring Brummies, a short-lived project featuring Black Sabbath founding members Geezer Butler and Bill Ward, for the 1994 tribute album Nativity in Black.
