= Paranoid (Black Sabbath song) =

1970 single by Black Sabbath

- 1976 UK reissue picture sleeve, featuring "Snowblind" as the B-side.

Single by Black Sabbath

from the album Paranoid
- B-side: "The Wizard" (1970); "Snowblind" (1976)
- Released: August 1970
- Recorded: 16 June 1970
- Studio: Island Studios, London
- Genre: Heavy metal; proto-punk
- Length: 2:48
- Label: Vertigo
- Songwriters: Geezer Butler; Tony Iommi; Ozzy Osbourne; Bill Ward
- Producer: Rodger Bain

Black Sabbath singles chronology
"The Wizard" (1970)	"Paranoid" (1970)	"Children of the Grave" (1971)

Alternative cover
- 2000 UK promotional reissue picture sleeve featuring the original B-side, "The Wizard". (Note: The sleeve design was first used on a 1970 Dutch release.)

Music video
- "Paranoid" on YouTube

"Paranoid" is a song by the English heavy metal band Black Sabbath, released in 1970 on the band's second studio album, Paranoid (1970). It is the first single from the album, while the B-side is the song "The Wizard". The song is widely regarded as one of the greatest heavy metal songs of all time. It reached number 4 on the UK singles chart and number 61 on the US Billboard Hot 100, becoming Black Sabbath's first song to place on both of those charts.

== Song information ==
"Paranoid" was the first Black Sabbath single release, coming six months after their self-titled debut was released. Black Sabbath bassist Geezer Butler (from Guitar World magazine, March 2004):

A lot of the Paranoid album was written around the time of our first album, Black Sabbath. We recorded the whole thing in about 2 or 3 days, live in the studio. The song "Paranoid" was written as an afterthought. We basically needed a 3 minute filler for the album, and Tony came up with the riff. I quickly did the lyrics, and Ozzy was reading them as he was singing.

The song is an E minor pentatonic and only uses power chords. The guitar solo is a dry signal on the left channel, which is patched through a ring modulator and routed to the right channel; this effect was used again on the 1978 song, "Johnny Blade".

According to extant lyric sheets, "Paranoid" was at one time titled "The Paranoid".

"Paranoid" eventually became the name of the album. Originally, the band had wanted to call the album War Pigs after the song of the same name, but the record company persuaded them to use "Paranoid" instead because it was less offensive.

"Paranoid" drew controversy for apparently encouraging suicide, much like Osbourne's later solo song "Suicide Solution". Particularly, the lyric "I tell you to enjoy life" was misheard as a mondegreen: "I tell you to end your life".

== Reception ==
Cash Box described the song as being "as dense, musically as 'Whole Lotta Love'", stating that "crashing, non-stop beat with gobs of bass and drums laced liberally with stinging, echoey vocals and hot guitar licks move the song along at a blistering pace."

"Paranoid" was ranked No. 34 on VH1's 40 Greatest Metal Songs. In March 2005, Q magazine placed it at number 11 in its list of the 100 Greatest Guitar Tracks. Rolling Stone ranked it number 250 on their list of the 500 Greatest Songs of All Time and 13th on their 2023 list "100 Greatest Heavy Metal Songs of All Time". "Paranoid" was ranked the fifth best Black Sabbath song by Rock – Das Gesamtwerk der größten Rock-Acts im Check. In 2020, Kerrang! ranked the song number five on their list of the 20 greatest Black Sabbath songs, and in 2021, Louder Sound ranked the song number six on their list of the 40 greatest Black Sabbath songs.

== Personnel ==
- Ozzy Osbourne – vocals
- Tony Iommi – guitars
- Geezer Butler – bass
- Bill Ward – drums

== Accolades ==
Publication	Country	Accolade	Year	Rank
NME	United Kingdom	"All Time Top 100 Singles"	1976	41
Spin	United States	"100 Greatest Singles of All Time"	1989	81
Radio Veronica	Netherlands	"Super All-Time List"	1989	16
Rock and Roll; Hall of Fame	United States	"The Rock and Roll Hall of Fame's 500 Songs that Shaped Rock and Roll"	1994	*
Guitarist	United Kingdom	"Top 100 Guitar Solos of All-Time"	1998	84
Rolling Stone	United States	"500 Greatest Songs of All Time"	2004	253
Q	United Kingdom	"1010 Songs You Must Own!"	2004	*
Q	United Kingdom	"100 Greatest Guitar Tracks Ever!"	2005	11
Q	United Kingdom	"100 Greatest Songs of All Time"	2006	100
VH1	United States	"40 Greatest Metal Songs"	2006	1
VH1	United States	"100 Greatest Hard Rock Songs"	2008	4
Planet Rock (radio station)	United Kingdom	"Top 500 Greatest Rock Songs of All Time"	2026	12

(*) designates unordered lists.

== Track listing ==
- 7" single (Vertigo 6059 010)
1. "Paranoid" – 2:45
2. "The Wizard" – 4:20
- 7" single (Vertigo 6059 014)
1. "Paranoid" – 2:50
2. "Rat Salad" – 2:30
- 7" singles (Vertigo AS 109)
1. "Paranoid" – 2:50
2. "Happy Being Me"^{[I]} – 15:54
- 7" 1977 re-release (Immediate 103 466)
1. "Paranoid" – 2:50
2. "Evil Woman" – 3:25
- 7" 1977 re-release (Nems SRS 510.044)
1. "Paranoid" – 2:50
2. "Tomorrow's Dream" – 3:11
- 7" 1980 re-release (Spiegelei INT 110.604)
1. "Paranoid" – 2:45
2. "Snowblind" – 5:25
- Digital Single (Reunion Live Promo Single)
1. "Paranoid" (Live at the NEC, Birmingham, UK - December 1997) - 3:49
2. "Psycho Man" (Radio Edit) - 4:03
3. "Psycho Man" (Danny Saber Remix Edit) - 4:14

Note

- I "Happy Being Me" is performed by Manfred Mann Chapter Three and appears on their second album Manfred Mann Chapter Three Volume Two.

== Charts ==
=== Weekly charts ===
Weekly chart performance for "Paranoid"
Chart (1970–1971)	Peak position
Australian Go-Set National Top 60	18
Austrian Singles Chart	3
Canadian Singles Chart	54
Danish Singles Chart	1
French Singles Chart	7
German Singles Chart	1
Irish Singles Chart	12
Italian Singles Chart	9
Netherlands (Dutch Top 40)	2
Norwegian Singles Chart	6
South African Springbok Radio Top 20	3
Swiss Singles Chart	2
UK Singles Chart	4
US Billboard Hot 100	61
US Cashbox Top 100	79

1980 chart performance for "Paranoid"
Chart (1980)	Peak position
UK Singles Chart	14

Chart (2023)	Peak position
Hungary (Single Top 40)	20

2025 chart performance for "Paranoid"
Chart (2025)	Peak position
Canada Hot 100 (Billboard)	44
Czech Republic Singles Digital (ČNS IFPI) 2009 Remaster	33
Finland (Suomen virallinen lista)	46
Germany (GfK)	50
Global 200 (Billboard)	25
Greece International (IFPI)	61
Ireland (IRMA)	28
Japan Hot Overseas (Billboard Japan)	10
New Zealand (Recorded Music NZ)	34
Norway (IFPI Norge)	48
Poland (Polish Streaming Top 100)	46
Portugal (AFP)	175
Russia Streaming (TopHit)	97
Slovakia Singles Digital (ČNS IFPI) 2009 Remaster	39
Sweden (Sverigetopplistan)	21
UK Singles (Official Charts)	20
UK Indie (Official Charts)	1
UK Rock & Metal (Official Charts)	1
US Hot Rock & Alternative Songs (Billboard)	8

=== Yearly charts ===
1970 year-end chart performance for "Paranoid"
Chart (1970)	Position
Netherlands (Dutch Top 40)	9

2025 year-end chart performance for "Paranoid"
Chart (2025)	Position
US Hot Rock & Alternative Songs (Billboard)	78

== Certifications ==
Region	Certification	Certified units/sales
Denmark (IFPI Danmark)	Platinum	90,000^{‡}
Germany (BVMI)	Platinum	600,000^{‡}
Italy (FIMI)	Platinum	50,000^{‡}
New Zealand (RMNZ)	4× Platinum	120,000^{‡}
Poland (ZPAV)	Gold	25,000^{‡}
Portugal (AFP)	2× Platinum	50,000^{‡}
Spain (Promusicae)	Gold	30,000^{‡}
United Kingdom (BPI)	Platinum	600,000^{‡}
Streaming
Greece (IFPI Greece)	Platinum	2,000,000^{†}
^{‡} Sales+streaming figures based on certification alone.^{†} Streaming-only figures based on certification alone.

== Cover versions ==
=== Cindy & Bert version ===
In 1971, German schlager vocal duo Cindy & Bert covered the song with lyrics based on Arthur Conan Doyle's The Hound of the Baskervilles as "Der Hund von Baskerville". The unlikely cover version with a heavy Hammond organ, featured in a TV show with a tiny Pekingese dog standing in as "hound" and dancers getting ushered back to their seats, has become a collector's curiosity and a document of 1971 zeitgeist.

=== The Dickies version ===
American punk rock group the Dickies covered the song for their debut album The Incredible Shrinking Dickies (1979). Released as single, it charted at No. 45 in the UK.

=== Type O Negative version ===
American gothic metal band Type O Negative covered the song for the remastered 1994 reissue of their second album, The Origin of the Feces. Running for 7 minutes and 20 seconds, the cover features a slower, more extended arrangement than the original and incorporates a section of Black Sabbath's Iron Man midway through the song.

=== Megadeth version ===
Megadeth's cover of "Paranoid" for the tribute album Nativity in Black: A Tribute to Black Sabbath received a Grammy nomination in 1995 for 'Best Metal Performance'. This track also famously ends with drummer Nick Menza forgetting to end the song and continuing to play as Dave Mustaine repeatedly yells his name.

=== Weezer version ===
In 2019, American rock band Weezer released a cover version of "Paranoid" for their twelfth studio album, Weezer (also known as the Teal album). Rhythm guitarist Brian Bell handles the lead vocals instead of frontman Rivers Cuomo.

== Legacy ==
- On 5 July 2025, Ozzy Osbourne and Black Sabbath held their final live performance titled Back to the Beginning. "Paranoid" was the final song that they performed. Osbourne died 17 days after the concert at the age of 76.
- The Band of the Coldstream Guards performed the song in tribute to Osbourne during the Changing of the Guards ceremony at Buckingham Palace, London on the day of Osbourne's funeral procession at Aston, Birmingham on 30 July.

== Popular culture ==
- In Finland, "Paranoid" has the same status as Lynyrd Skynyrd's "Free Bird" in the United States as a song the audience finds humorous to request during a concert. So regardless of a band or the style of music in question, somebody may shout "Soittakaa 'Paranoid'!" ("Play 'Paranoid'!") during a gig.
