= Fairies Wear Boots =

1970 song by Black Sabbath

Song by Black Sabbath

from the album Paranoid
- A-side: "After Forever"
- Released: 18 September 1970
- Recorded: 1970
- Genre: Heavy metal
- Length: 6:14
- Label: Vertigo
- Songwriters: Tony Iommi; Ozzy Osbourne; Geezer Butler; Bill Ward
- Producer: Rodger Bain

"Fairies Wear Boots" is a song by the English heavy metal band Black Sabbath, appearing on their 1970 album Paranoid. It was released in 1971 as the B-side to the single "After Forever".

On original 1970 US copies of the Paranoid album, the song's intro was listed under the title "Jack the Stripper", formatted as "Jack the Stripper/Fairies Wear Boots".

The song has been ranked the 11th best Black Sabbath song by German author Christoph Rehe.

== Background ==
The exact inspiration behind "Fairies Wear Boots" is unclear. In the 2010 documentary film Classic Albums: Black Sabbath's Paranoid, the band's bassist Geezer Butler states that Ozzy Osbourne composed the lyrics after a group of skinheads in London called him a "fairy" because of his long hair. However, Butler also stated Ozzy’s lyrics often went off in random tangents, and the second half of the song was about LSD. Osbourne, in the same documentary, said he wrote the lyrics about LSD. In 2010, Osbourne stated in his autobiography I Am Ozzy that he did not recall what the song was written about.

== Versions ==
A live version of "Fairies Wear Boots", taken from a session for the BBC's John Peel Sunday Show dated April 26, 1970, is featured on the bonus disc of a 1997 Ozzy Osbourne compilation entitled The Ozzman Cometh. The song also appears on the Black Sabbath's first compilation album, We Sold Our Soul for Rock 'n' Roll.

Osbourne released a live rendition of the song on his 1982 solo album Speak of the Devil.

== Personnel ==
- Ozzy Osbourne – vocals
- Tony Iommi – guitars
- Geezer Butler – bass
- Bill Ward – drums
