= Iron Man (song) =

1970 single by Black Sabbath

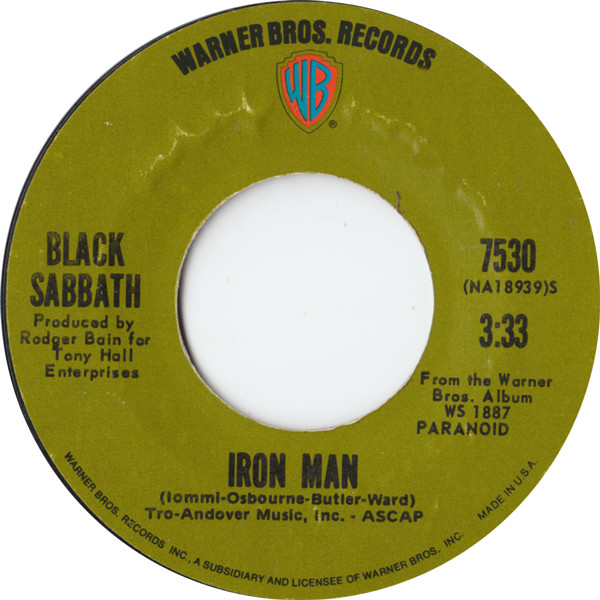

Single by Black Sabbath

from the album Paranoid
- B-side: "Electric Funeral"
- Released: 7 October 1971 (US)
- Recorded: June 1970
- Genre: Heavy metal
- Length: 5:56 (album version); 3:33 (single version)
- Label: Warner Bros.
- Songwriters: Tony Iommi; Ozzy Osbourne; Geezer Butler; Bill Ward
- Producer: Rodger Bain

Black Sabbath singles chronology
"Paranoid" (1970)	"Iron Man" (1971)	"Tomorrow's Dream" (1972)

"Iron Man" is a song by the English heavy metal band Black Sabbath, released in 1970 from the band's second studio album, Paranoid.

== Background and composition ==
The "Iron Man" riff

While recording the song, producer Rodger Bain and studio engineer Tom Allom had tremendous difficulty capturing the "power and depth of the sound" of Bill Ward's bass drum in the studio due to the limitations of the microphones available at that time. While some sources state that Ozzy Osbourne recorded the spoken opening line "I am Iron Man" by speaking into a metal fan, others dispute this as unlikely.

The lyrics, composed by bassist and lyricist Geezer Butler, tell the story of a self-fulfilling prophecy in which a man travels into the future and witnesses the apocalypse. In the process of returning to the present day to warn the human race, he is turned into steel by a magnetic field and is subsequently ridiculed and ignored by the people he intended to save. Feeling resentful, Iron Man retaliates by actually causing the apocalypse seen in his vision.

Butler has been clear that there is no link between the song and the Marvel Comics superhero of the same name, explaining that he had not read American comics as a child. Rather, he took his lyrical inspiration from Osbourne's "iron bloke" remark and he decided to compose the lyrics as a science fiction story. Raised in a devout Catholic family, Butler also intended the song's subject as an allegory for Jesus Christ, but rather than forgiving his doubters and tormentors, Iron Man instead seeks vengeance. Butler recalled, "I liked the Hammer horror films in the 1960s and magazines such as Man, Myth and Magic, but I had a few supernatural experiences as a child and dreams that came true and that, more than anything, shaped my interest in the occult", additionally citing H. G. Wells's novels as inspiration.

== Reception and legacy ==
The song peaked at number 52 on the Billboard Hot 100 in 1972, becoming their highest-charting single on the chart. It also reached number 68 on the Canadian RPM Magazine Top 100. The live rendition of the song from their Reunion (1998) album won them the 2000 Grammy Awards for Best Metal Performance.

"Iron Man" was used in the end credits of Iron Man (2008), as well in its video game adaptation and the trailer for the 2010 sequel, Iron Man 2. The character Tony Stark, alter-ego of Iron Man, also wears a Black Sabbath t-shirt in the 2012 film The Avengers. The song won spot number 317 in Rolling Stone's list of the 500 Greatest Songs of All Time as of 2004, and number 7 on their "100 Greatest Heavy Metal Songs of All Time" list in March 2023. "Iron Man" was ranked the sixth best Black Sabbath song by Rock – Das Gesamtwerk der größten Rock-Acts im Check. VH1 ranked the song as the greatest heavy metal song of all time.

The wrestling team Road Warriors used a reworked version called "We are Iron Men" as their entrance theme throughout the 1980s.

"Iron Man" was covered by Californian punk rock band NOFX on one of their first EPs "Maximum Rocknroll"

== Personnel ==
- Ozzy Osbourne – vocals
- Tony Iommi – guitars
- Geezer Butler – bass
- Bill Ward – drums

== Charts ==
2011–2025 weekly chart performance for "Iron Man"
Chart (2011–2025)	Peak position
Global 200 (Billboard)	116
Sweden (Sverigetopplistan)	83
UK Singles (Official Charts)	48
UK Independent (Official Charts)	13
UK Rock & Metal (Official Charts)	7
US Hot Rock & Alternative Songs (Billboard)	12

== Certifications ==
Certifications for "Iron Man"
Region	Certification	Certified units/sales
Denmark (IFPI Danmark)	Gold	45,000^{‡}
Italy (FIMI)	Gold	50,000^{‡}
New Zealand (RMNZ)	Platinum	30,000^{‡}
United Kingdom (BPI)	Platinum	600,000^{‡}
^{‡} Sales+streaming figures based on certification alone.
