= War Pigs =

1970 song by Black Sabbath

Song by Black Sabbath

from the album Paranoid
- Released: 18 September 1970
- Recorded: 1970
- Genre: Heavy metal; stoner rock
- Length: 7:57
- Label: Vertigo
- Songwriter: Tony Iommi · Ozzy Osbourne · Geezer Butler · Bill Ward
- Producer: Rodger Bain

Audio sample
- "War Pigs": file; help

"War Pigs" is an anti-war protest song by English heavy metal band Black Sabbath. It is the opening track from the band's second studio album, Paranoid (released in 1970).

== Overview ==
The original title of "War Pigs" was "Walpurgis", dealing with the Witches' Sabbath. "Walpurgis is sort of like Christmas for Satanists. And to me, war was the big Satan", said bassist and lyricist Geezer Butler. "It wasn't about politics or government or anything. It was Evil itself. So I was saying 'generals gathered in the masses / just like witches at black masses' to make an analogy. But when we brought it to the record company, they thought 'Walpurgis' sounded too Satanic. And that's when we turned it into 'War Pigs'. But we didn't change the lyrics, because they were already finished."

National service had ended in 1963 in the United Kingdom but with the Vietnam War still ongoing, many young men feared they would be conscripted to fight in it. "That's what started this whole rebellion thing about not going to war for anybody", said Butler. "I was dreading being called up", the lyricist recalled.

Prior to its official release, the band often altered the lyrics significantly when performing it live. An example of this can be found on Ozzy Osbourne's compilation The Ozzman Cometh, which features an early version recorded by Black Sabbath for BBC Radio 1 on 26 April 1970. While Butler has said that "War Pigs" is "totally against the Vietnam War, about how these rich politicians and rich people start all the wars for their benefit and get all the poor people to die for them", vocalist Osbourne has stated that the group "knew nothing about Vietnam. It's just an anti-war song." The song's instrumental outro is entitled "Luke's Wall" on US releases of the album, formatted as "War Pigs/Luke's Wall".

Drummer Bill Ward's first memory of performing the song was at the Beat-Club in the hotel Hirschen in Zurich, Switzerland, in 1969. The band was required to play multiple sets every night and had little material in their repertoire at that point, so they would perform lengthy jam sessions to fill in the sets. Co-writer and lead guitarist Tony Iommi has said that "War Pigs" originated from one of those jam sessions.

The addition of the air-raid siren and the speeding up of the song's end were done by producer Rodger Bain and engineer Tom Allom. The band had no input in these decisions, although they were pleased with the results.

== Legacy ==
Music journalist Martin Popoff has called the song an "ugly, antiwar classic now considered one of Sabbath's top two or three most enduring compositions". Guitar World described the song as "the greatest HM song ever." The magazine also included the song on their list of the "100 Greatest Guitar Solos" and ranked it in 56th place. Steve Huey of AllMusic called the song a "standard".

Kelefa Sanneh wrote, "What is memorable is the way Osbourne evokes not merely war's cost but its seductive appeal. Part of what made Black Sabbath seem new was a disinclination to uplifting, or hopeful, or self-righteous."

"War Pigs" is widely considered one of Black Sabbath's greatest songs. In 2020, Kerrang! ranked the song number four on their list of the 20 greatest Black Sabbath songs, and in 2021, Louder Sound ranked the song number one on their list of the 40 greatest Black Sabbath songs.

"War Pigs" was ranked the best Black Sabbath song by Rock - Das Gesamtwerk der größten Rock-Acts im Check.

The song is notable for its publication in the American folk music magazine Broadside, which normally did not feature rock songs.

The song's guitar riff largely inspired that of Arctic Monkeys' 2014 single "Arabella", to the extent that the band often perform an interlude of the song, to enable front man Alex Turner to pick up his guitar in time for his solo. In more recent times, when performing a live rendition of Arabella, the Arctic Monkeys often end the live performance of the song with a tease of the songs riff.

War Pigs was featured in the credits of the 2014 film 300: Rise of an Empire, a sequel to the 2007 film 300.

War Pigs was one of the 40 songs featured in the Music Monday series of the Newseum, and thus part of the Reporting Vietnam exhibit as a major musical reflection of the time.

WWE has used the song for their NXT TakeOver: WarGames events, as well as their Survivor Series WarGames event since the 2022 edition.

Several of the University of Arkansas' sports teams, known as the Razorbacks (a term for feral pigs, which are known for their ferocity), use War Pigs as their run-out/tunnel walk music. The song is also part of the regular repertoire of the Razorback Marching Band.

In 2023, Rolling Stone ranked the song number five on their list of the 100 greatest heavy metal songs.

Judas Priest has used War Pigs as their walk on music since late 2011. On July 2nd, 2025, Judas Priest released a cover of War Pigs on their official YouTube channel. Black Sabbath also posted the video to their official YouTube channel.

During the 2026 Grammy Awards ceremony, the song was played live during the "in memoriam" portion of the show with a band consisting of Guns n Roses guitarist Slash and bassist Duff McKagan, vocalist Post Malone, Andrew Watt on the guitar, and Red Hot Chili Peppers drummer Chad Smith, in order to pay posthumous homage to Ozzy Osbourne.

== Personnel ==
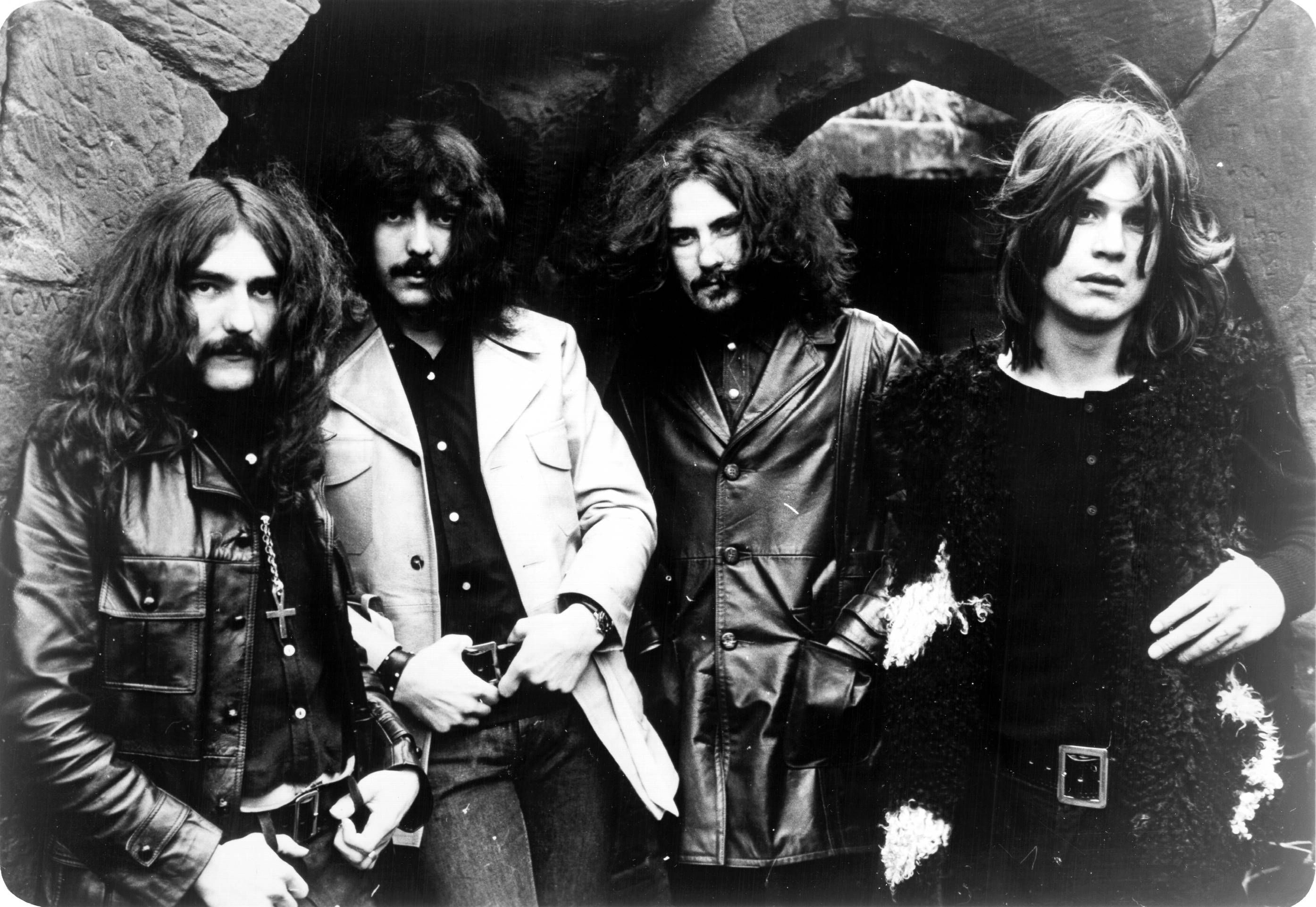
Black Sabbath in 1970. From left to right: Butler, Iommi, Ward, Osbourne.

- Ozzy Osbourne – vocals
- Tony Iommi – guitars
- Geezer Butler – bass
- Bill Ward – drums

== Covers ==
Faith No More released a cover of the song on their 1989 album The Real Thing (non-vinyl bonus number). On 9 November 1990, Ozzy Osbourne performed the song together with Faith No More and James Hetfield of Metallica on guitar at the Hollywood Palladium. The song was also covered by different other artists. T-Pain covered the song on his 2023 album On Top of the Covers. Geezer Butler approved of the version and Ozzy Osbourne described it as "the best cover of 'War Pigs' ever". The Ethiopian band uKanDanZ released a cover of the song on their 2025 album Evil Plan with the lyrics sung in the Amharic language.

At the GRAMMYs in 2026 a performance of the song was done in tribute by vocalist Post Malone, joined by Slash, Duff McKagan, Chad Smith & Andrew Watt.

== Charts ==
2014–2025 weekly chart performance for "War Pigs"
Chart (2014–2025)	Peak position
Global 200 (Billboard)	190
Sweden Heatseeker (Sverigetopplistan)	16
UK Singles (Official Charts)	47
UK Independent (Official Charts)	11
UK Rock & Metal (Official Charts)	4
US Hot Rock & Alternative Songs (Billboard)	15

== Certifications ==
Certifications for "War Pigs"
Region	Certification	Certified units/sales
New Zealand (RMNZ)	2× Platinum	60,000^{‡}
United Kingdom (BPI)	Gold	400,000^{‡}
^{‡} Sales+streaming figures based on certification alone.

== See also ==
- List of anti-war songs
