= Greatest Hits 1970–1978 =

2006 greatest hits album by Black Sabbath

Greatest hits album by Black Sabbath
- Released: 14 March 2006
- Recorded: 1969–1978
- Genre: Heavy metal
- Length: 74:28
- Labels: Rhino; Warner Bros.
- Producers: Black Sabbath; Rodger Bain; Patrick Meehan; Mike Butcher

Black Sabbath chronology
Black Box: The Complete Original Black Sabbath 1970–1978 (2004)	Greatest Hits 1970–1978 (2006)	Black Sabbath: The Dio Years (2007)

Professional ratings
Review scores
Source	Rating
AllMusic	4/5 stars
Pitchfork Media	6.2/10.0
The Rolling Stone Album Guide	4/5 stars

Greatest Hits 1970–1978 is a compilation album from the English heavy metal band Black Sabbath, released in 2006.

This album features only the original line-up of Black Sabbath with all the albums Ozzy Osbourne worked on presented from 1970's self-titled debut album to 1978's Never Say Die!.

The album debuted on the Billboard 200 album chart on 1 April 2006 at number 96. It spent 10 weeks on the chart.

It was released to coincide with the band's induction into the American Rock and Roll Hall of Fame.

== Track listing ==
All songs written by Black Sabbath (Tony Iommi, Ozzy Osbourne, Geezer Butler, and Bill Ward).

No.	Title	Original album	Length
1.	"Black Sabbath"	Black Sabbath, 1970	6:16
2.	"N.I.B."	Black Sabbath	5:22
3.	"The Wizard"	Black Sabbath	4:20
4.	"War Pigs"	Paranoid, 1970	7:54
5.	"Paranoid"	Paranoid	2:48
6.	"Iron Man" (Single version)	Paranoid	3:29
7.	"Sweet Leaf"	Master of Reality, 1971	5:03
8.	"Children of the Grave"	Master of Reality	5:15
9.	"Changes"	Vol. 4, 1972	4:43
10.	"Snowblind"	Vol. 4	5:27
11.	"Supernaut"	Vol. 4	4:41
12.	"Sabbath Bloody Sabbath"	Sabbath Bloody Sabbath, 1973	5:42
13.	"Hole in the Sky"	Sabotage, 1975	4:02
14.	"Rock 'n' Roll Doctor"	Technical Ecstasy, 1976	3:26
15.	"Never Say Die"	Never Say Die!, 1978	3:48
16.	"Dirty Women"	Technical Ecstasy	7:13

== Personnel ==
Black Sabbath

- Ozzy Osbourne - vocals, harmonica on "The Wizard"
- Tony Iommi - guitars, cough on "Sweet Leaf", synthesiser on "Children of the Grave", piano and mellotron on "Changes"
- Geezer Butler - bass, Mellotron on "Changes", fuzz bass on "Sabbath Bloody Sabbath"
- Bill Ward - drums, percussion on "Children of the Grave", "Supernaut", "Sabbath Bloody Sabbath" and "Hole In The Sky"

=== Production ===
- Sharon Osbourne – executive production
- Rodger Bain, Patrick Meehan, Mike Butcher – production
- Dan Hersch, Bill Inglot – remastering

== Charts ==
Chart (2006)	Peak position
US Billboard 200	96

Chart (2025)	Peak position
New Zealand Albums (RMNZ)	6

== Release history ==
United Kingdom	14 March 2006	Rhino Records
United States	???	Warner Bros. Records
Canada	???	Warner Bros. Records
