= Greatest Hits (Black Sabbath album) =

Greatest hits album by Black Sabbath
- Released: 15 June 2009
- Recorded: 1969–1978
- Genre: Heavy metal
- Length: 72:59
- Label: Universal/UMC
- Producers: Black Sabbath; Rodger Bain; Patrick Meehan; Mike Butcher

Black Sabbath chronology
The Rules of Hell (2008)	Greatest Hits (2009)	13 (2013)

Alternative cover
- Iron Man: The Best of Black Sabbath 2012 album cover

Professional ratings
Review scores
Source	Rating
AllMusic	4/5 stars

Greatest Hits is a compilation album from the English heavy metal band Black Sabbath, released by Universal in 2009.

This album features only the original line-up of Black Sabbath with most of the albums Ozzy Osbourne worked on presented. This compilation features songs from 1970's self-titled debut album to Sabbath Bloody Sabbath, as well as one song from Never Say Die!.

This compilations used the same masters from the Universal 2009 album remasters.

A similar compilation of the same name was released outside North America by NEMS Records in 1977.

The album was re-released in 2012 as Iron Man: The Best of Black Sabbath to support the band's 2012 tour, and featured different artwork.

== Track listing ==
No.	Title	Original release	Length
1.	"Paranoid"	Paranoid, 1970	2:47
2.	"Iron Man"	Paranoid	5:55
3.	"Changes"	Vol. 4, 1972	4:43
4.	"Fairies Wear Boots"	Paranoid	6:13
5.	"War Pigs"	Paranoid	7:54
6.	"Never Say Die"	Never Say Die!, 1978	3:48
7.	"Children of the Grave"	Master of Reality, 1971	5:15
8.	"The Wizard"	Black Sabbath, 1970	4:20
9.	"Snowblind"	Vol. 4	5:27
10.	"Sweet Leaf"	Master of Reality	5:05
11.	"Evil Woman"	Black Sabbath	3:22
12.	"Sabbath Bloody Sabbath"	Sabbath Bloody Sabbath, 1973	5:48
13.	"Black Sabbath"	Black Sabbath	6:16
14.	"N.I.B."	Black Sabbath	6:07

== Personnel ==
Black Sabbath

- Ozzy Osbourne - vocals, harmonica on "The Wizard"
- Tony Iommi - guitars, piano, mellotron on "Changes", synthesizer on "Children Of The Grave"
- Geezer Butler - bass, mellotron on "Changes", fuzz bass on "Sabbath Bloody Sabbath"
- Bill Ward - drums, percussion

== Release history ==
Europe & Australasia	9 June 2009	Universal Music

== Charts ==
=== As Greatest Hits ===
Chart (2009)	Peak position
Austrian Albums (Ö3 Austria)	73
Scottish Albums (Official Charts)	28
Swedish Albums (Sverigetopplistan)	3
UK Albums (Official Charts)	19
UK Rock & Metal Albums (Official Charts)	2

== Certifications ==
=== As Greatest Hits ===
Region	Certification	Certified units/sales
United Kingdom (BPI)	Gold	100,000^{^}
^{^} Shipments figures based on certification alone.

=== As Iron Man: The Best of Black Sabbath ===
Region	Certification	Certified units/sales
Australia (ARIA)	Platinum	70,000^{^}
^{^} Shipments figures based on certification alone.
