= Black Box: The Complete Original Black Sabbath 1970–1978 =

Box set by Black Sabbath
- Released: 27 April 2004
- Recorded: 1969–1978
- Genre: Heavy metal
- Length: 5:35:01
- Labels: Rhino; Warner Bros.

Black Sabbath chronology
Symptom of the Universe: The Original Black Sabbath 1970–1978 (2002)	Black Box: The Complete Original Black Sabbath 1970–1978 (2004)	Greatest Hits 1970–1978 (2006)

Professional ratings
Review scores
Source	Rating
AllMusic	4.5/5 stars
The Rolling Stone Album Guide	5/5 stars

Black Box: The Complete Original Black Sabbath 1970–1978 is a collection of the first eight albums by the English heavy metal band Black Sabbath and a DVD of 4 videos. The set contains the albums recorded with original singer Ozzy Osbourne, who was fired in 1979 after completion of the band's Never Say Die! tour. This marked the end of the group's original line-up that featured Osbourne, guitarist Tony Iommi, bassist Geezer Butler and drummer Bill Ward. All eight albums are digitally remastered and repackaged in mock vinyl LP packaging, including an 80-page booklet with liner notes written by Henry Rollins, Chris Welch, and Brian Ives.

The discs included in the set are as follows:

- 1970 Black Sabbath
- 1970 Paranoid
- 1971 Master of Reality
- 1972 Vol. 4
- 1973 Sabbath Bloody Sabbath
- 1975 Sabotage
- 1976 Technical Ecstasy
- 1978 Never Say Die!
- 2004 Bonus DVD:

1. "Black Sabbath"
2. "Paranoid"
3. "Iron Man"
4. "Blue Suede Shoes"

They are represented as they appeared when first released, with the exception of the debut album, which has a revised track order as it includes both the song "Evil Woman" from the original European LP—deleted from North American editions because of copyright problems—and "Wicked World", which was substituted for it. The discs are kept in digipak cases, with all original LP artwork intact. The CDs themselves are entirely black, but retain the lettering used for each individual release, as opposed to a uniform stylized font.

True to its title, the nine discs are housed in a solid black case, complete with gothic imagery and lettering. Inside, there are two smaller boxes containing four CDs each. Also enclosed is a booklet, which contains the DVD in a sleeve attached to the inside back cover. The booklet traces the entire history of the band, with essays, interviews, timelines, and the lyrics to every song personally checked by Geezer Butler, the band's main lyricist.

Previously, a 1996 remastered box set had been issued by Castle Communications, which used unknown source tapes and did not involve any input from the band. For the Rhino set, all of the songs have been digitally remastered from the original Warner Bros. tape archives, as was the earlier Rhino compilation Symptom of the Universe.

== Personnel ==
Black Sabbath

- Ozzy Osbourne - lead and backing vocals, harmonica, tambourine, synthesisers, handclaps
- Tony Iommi - guitars, acoustic guitar, slide guitar, keyboards, synthesisers, piano, organ, mellotron, harpsichord, flute, bagpipes, harp, sound effects, cough, backing vocals, handclaps
- Geezer Butler - bass, synthesisers, mellotron, backing vocals, handclaps, noise
- Bill Ward - drums, percussion, congas, bongos, sleigh bells, timpani, backing, scat and lead vocals, piano, handclaps

Additional

- Rick Wakeman - piano, minimoog (Sabbath Bloody Sabbath)
- Gerald Woodruffe - keyboards (Technical Ecstasy)
- Don Airey – keyboards (Never Say Die!)
- John Elstar – harmonica (Never Say Die!)
- Dan Hersch, Bill Inglot – remastering

== Release history ==
Region	Date	Label
United Kingdom	27 April 2004	Rhino Records
United States	2004	Warner Bros. Records
Canada	???	Warner Bros. Records
Australia	???	Warner Bros. Records
