= Symptom of the Universe: The Original Black Sabbath 1970–1978 =

Greatest hits album by Black Sabbath
- Released: 22 October 2002
- Recorded: 1969–78
- Genre: Heavy metal
- Length: 152:05
- Label: Rhino; Warner Bros.
- Producer: Sharon Osbourne

Black Sabbath chronology
| Past Lives (2002) | Symptom of the Universe: The Original Black Sabbath 1970–1978 (2002) | Black Box: The Complete Original Black Sabbath 1970–1978 (2004) |

Professional ratings
Review scores
| Source | Rating |
|---|---|
| Allmusic | 4.5/5 stars |
| The Rolling Stone Album Guide | 4/5 stars |
| Tom Hull – on the Web | B |

Symptom of the Universe: The Original Black Sabbath 1970–1978 is a compilation album released by the English heavy metal band Black Sabbath in 2002.

All songs have been remastered for this compilation. The Black Box set, which was released in 2004, contained versions of the band's first eight albums remastered during the same sessions as this compilation.

== Track listing ==
All songs written by Tony Iommi, Geezer Butler, Bill Ward, Ozzy Osbourne, except where noted.

=== Disc one ===
| No. | Title | Original album | Length |
|---|---|---|---|
| 1. | "Black Sabbath" | Black Sabbath, 1970 | 6:19 |
| 2. | "N.I.B." | Black Sabbath | 6:07 |
| 3. | "The Wizard" | Black Sabbath | 4:24 |
| 4. | "Warning" (The Aynsley Dunbar Retaliation cover; Aynsley Dunbar, Alex Dmochowski, Victor Hickling, John Moorshead) | Black Sabbath | 10:32 |
| 5. | "Evil Woman†" (Crow cover; Larry Weigand, Dick Weigand, David Wagner) | Black Sabbath | 3:25 |
| 6. | "Paranoid" | Paranoid, 1970 | 2:47 |
| 7. | "Iron Man" | Paranoid | 5:58 |
| 8. | "War Pigs" | Paranoid | 7:55 |
| 9. | "Fairies Wear Boots" | Paranoid | 6:13 |
| 10. | "Sweet Leaf" | Master of Reality, 1971 | 5:05 |
| 11. | "Children of the Grave" | Master of Reality | 5:18 |
| 12. | "Into the Void" | Master of Reality | 6:13 |
| 13. | "Lord of This World" | Master of Reality | 5:27 |

† - Previously unavailable in the US

=== Disc two ===
| No. | Title | Original album | Length |
|---|---|---|---|
| 1. | "After Forever" | Master of Reality | 5:25 |
| 2. | "Snowblind" | Vol. 4, 1972 | 5:33 |
| 3. | "Laguna Sunrise" | Vol. 4 | 2:55 |
| 4. | "Changes" | Vol. 4 | 4:44 |
| 5. | "Tomorrow's Dream" | Vol. 4 | 3:11 |
| 6. | "Supernaut" | Vol. 4 | 4:49 |
| 7. | "Sabbath Bloody Sabbath" | Sabbath Bloody Sabbath, 1973 | 5:45 |
| 8. | "Fluff" | Sabbath Bloody Sabbath | 4:11 |
| 9. | "Sabbra Cadabra" | Sabbath Bloody Sabbath | 5:56 |
| 10. | "Am I Going Insane (Radio)" | Sabotage, 1975 | 4:16 |
| 11. | "Symptom of the Universe" | Sabotage | 6:29 |
| 12. | "Hole in the Sky" | Sabotage | 3:59 |
| 13. | "Rock 'n' Roll Doctor" | Technical Ecstasy, 1976 | 3:30 |
| 14. | "Dirty Women" | Technical Ecstasy | 7:13 |
| 15. | "Never Say Die" | Never Say Die!, 1978 | 3:50 |
| 16. | "A Hard Road" | Never Say Die! | 6:04 |

== Personnel ==
- Dan Hersch, Bill Inglot – remastering

== Release history ==
| Region | Date | Label |
|---|---|---|
| United Kingdom | 22 October 2002 | Rhino Records |
| United States | 15 October 2002 | Warner Bros. Records |
| Canada | ? | Warner Bros. Records |
