= Reunion (Black Sabbath album) =

Live album by Black Sabbath
- Released: 19 October 1998
- Recorded: 4–5 December 1997 (live tracks); April–May 1998 (studio tracks)
- Venue: NEC (Birmingham)
- Studio: A&M (Hollywood)
- Genre: Heavy metal
- Length: 107:36
- Label: Epic
- Producer: Thom Panunzio (live tracks); Bob Marlette (studio tracks)

Black Sabbath chronology
Under Wheels of Confusion (1996)	Reunion (1998)	The Best of Black Sabbath (2000)

Singles from Reunion
- 1. "Psycho Man" Released: 20 October 1998

Professional ratings
Review scores
Source	Rating
AllMusic	3/5 stars
Entertainment Weekly	(B+)
NME	7/10
Pitchfork	2.1/10
The Rolling Stone Album Guide	3/5 stars

Reunion is a live album by the English heavy metal band Black Sabbath, released on 19 October 1998. As implied by the title, the album features a reunion of the original lineup of vocalist Ozzy Osbourne, guitarist Tony Iommi, bassist Geezer Butler and drummer Bill Ward for the first time since Never Say Die! (1978). "Psycho Man", one of two studio tracks on the album, was the last to feature Ward on drums. Black Sabbath received their first ever Grammy Award in 2000 for the live recording of "Iron Man" taken from Reunion.

On 13 October 2023, the album was released, remastered from the original source tapes and released world-wide with the two studio songs remastered by Danny Saber.

== Background ==
Six years after founding member Ozzy Osbourne departed Black Sabbath under less than amicable circumstances, he briefly rejoined his former bandmates for a single performance on 13 July 1985 at the Live Aid benefit concert in Philadelphia, and again in 1992 for the climax of his No More Tours farewell tour. Much to the dismay of fans, neither brief reconciliation had resulted in a full-fledged Black Sabbath reunion resulting in a new album and tour. A serious attempt at a reunion in 1993 proved fruitless as the band members lamented the reappearance of old animus. In 1997, Osbourne, Iommi and Butler reunited for the 1997 Ozzfest shows as Black Sabbath. Ward was absent due to health issues, and he was replaced by Faith No More's Mike Bordin. Ward had made a brief return to Black Sabbath for a short South American tour in 1994, but it was with Tony Martin fronting the band. Anticipation for a full and meaningful reunion of the Osbourne-era version of the band was high.

== Recording ==
By late 1997, all four original members put aside their differences and misgivings and two shows in their hometown at the NEC were booked. On 4 and 5 December 1997, the four original members of Black Sabbath performed together with the shows recorded for a highly anticipated live album release. Ward had a heart condition, and concern regarding his health and ability to perform at a high level meant that another former Black Sabbath drummer, Vinny Appice, was on standby for the two homecoming shows. "We hadn't done a show with Bill for 18 years," remarked Iommi. Ward made it through both shows – albeit not without incident:

Bill hit a gong and it fell on him, I creased up. His arm was black and blue in the morning, because those things weigh a ton. When it hit him and fell onto the kit, it sounded like someone was throwing pots and pans around. We were waiting for something like that to happen.

— Tony Iommi

Along with live versions of classics such as "Paranoid", "N.I.B.", "Black Sabbath" and "Iron Man", the double album also included two newly recorded studio tracks: "Selling My Soul" and "Psycho Man". These two new tracks were also released on a CD single in the United States. Music critics applauded the band's decision to surprise fans by including unexpected songs which had not been played live in many years, such as "Spiral Architect" and "Behind the Wall of Sleep".

== Track listing ==
All tracks are written by Tony Iommi, Geezer Butler, Ozzy Osbourne and Bill Ward, except where noted.

Disc one
No.	Title	Original album	Length
1.	"War Pigs"	Paranoid (1970)	8:28
2.	"Behind the Wall of Sleep" ("Bassically" starts at 3:28)	Black Sabbath (1970)	4:07
3.	"N.I.B."	Black Sabbath	6:45
4.	"Fairies Wear Boots"	Paranoid	6:19
5.	"Electric Funeral"	Paranoid	5:02
6.	"Sweet Leaf"	Master of Reality (1971)	5:07
7.	"Spiral Architect"	Sabbath Bloody Sabbath (1973)	5:40
8.	"Into the Void"	Master of Reality	6:32
9.	"Snowblind"	Vol. 4 (1972)	6:08

Disc two
No.	Title	Original album	Length
1.	"Sabbath Bloody Sabbath"	Sabbath Bloody Sabbath	4:43
2.	"Orchid/Lord of This World"	Master of Reality	7:07
3.	"Dirty Women"	Technical Ecstasy (1976)	6:29
4.	"Black Sabbath"	Black Sabbath	7:07
5.	"Iron Man"	Paranoid	8:21
6.	"Embryo/Children of the Grave"	Master of Reality	6:30
7.	"Paranoid"	Paranoid	4:28
8.	"Psycho Man" (Iommi, Osbourne)	Reunion (1998)	5:18
9.	"Selling My Soul" (Iommi, Osbourne)	Reunion	3:10

== Personnel ==
Black Sabbath

- Ozzy Osbourne – vocals
- Tony Iommi – guitars
- Geezer Butler – bass
- Bill Ward – drums (all except "Selling My Soul")

Additional personnel

- Geoff Nicholls – keyboards (live tracks)

Technical personnel

- Thom Panunzio – producer, engineer (live tracks)
- Bob Marlette – producer and engineer (studio tracks), mixing at Rockfield Studios and A&M Studios
- Greg Hackett, Barry Clempson – engineers
- Phil Ault, John Aguto, Phil Hopkins – assistant engineers
- Andrew Garver – digital editing
- David Collins – mastering
- Glen Wexler – cover design and photography

== Charts ==
=== Album ===
Chart (1998)	Peak position
Canadian Albums (Billboard)	6
Estonian Albums (Eesti Top 10)	10
European Albums Chart	81
Finnish Albums (Suomen virallinen lista)	29
French Albums (SNEP)	65
German Albums (Offizielle Top 100)	40
Japanese Albums (Oricon)	29
Scottish Albums (OCC)	59
Swedish Albums (Sverigetopplistan)	11
UK Albums (OCC)	41
UK Rock & Metal Albums (OCC)	2
US Billboard 200	11

2023–2025 chart performance for Reunion
Chart (2023–2025)	Peak position
German Albums (Offizielle Top 100)	32
Greek Albums (IFPI)	53
Swiss Albums (Schweizer Hitparade)	84

Singles – Billboard (North America)

Year	Single	Chart	Position
1998	"Psycho Man"	Mainstream Rock Tracks	3
1999	"Selling My Soul"	Mainstream Rock Tracks	17

== Certifications ==
Region	Certification	Certified units/sales
Canada (Music Canada)	Platinum	100,000^{^}
United Kingdom (BPI)	Silver	60,000^{‡}
United States (RIAA)	Platinum	1,000,000^{^}
^{^} Shipments figures based on certification alone.^{‡} Sales+streaming figures based on certification alone.
