= Psycho Man (song) =

Single by Black Sabbath

from the album Reunion
- Released: 20 October 1998
- Recorded: A&M Studios, Hollywood, California, April–May 1998
- Genre: Doom metal, heavy metal
- Length: 5:18
- Label: Epic
- Songwriters: Ozzy Osbourne, Tony Iommi
- Producer: Bob Marlette

Black Sabbath singles chronology
| "Master of Insanity" (1992) | "Psycho Man" (1998) | "God Is Dead?" (2013) |

"Psycho Man" is a single by the English heavy metal band Black Sabbath. It was originally released on the Reunion album in 1998, and was the first of two new singles from the album, the other being "Selling My Soul". The song reached number 3 on the U.S. Mainstream Rock chart. The song was later included in Ozzy Osbourne's 2005 box set Prince of Darkness. The music and lyrics were written by singer Ozzy Osbourne and guitarist Tony Iommi. "Psycho Man" and "Selling My Soul" are the only Black Sabbath songs to be credited just to these two members. In Canada, the song reached number 24 on the RPM chart.

In 1999, "Psycho Man" was remixed by Danny Saber for No Boundaries: A Benefit for the Kosovar Refugees; music critic Robert Christgau regarded it as a highlight of the album.

As a drum machine would be used for "Selling My Soul", "Psycho Man" would prove to be the last original Black Sabbath song to feature Bill Ward on drums and hence, the final Black Sabbath song recorded by all four original members of the band.

== Track listing ==
1. "Psycho Man" (Danny Saber remix) – 4:17
2. "Psycho Man" (radio edit) – 4:06
3. "Psycho Man" (album version) – 5:23

== Personnel ==
- Ozzy Osbourne – vocals
- Tony Iommi – guitars
- Geezer Butler – bass guitar
- Bill Ward – drums
- Bob Marlette – producing, engineering
