= Technical Ecstasy Tour =

1976–77 concert tour by Black Sabbath

- Tour by Black Sabbath
- Poster to the concert in Brussels, Belgium
- Location: Europe; North America
- Associated album: Technical Ecstasy
- Start date: 22 October 1976
- End date: 22 April 1977
- Legs: 2
- No. of shows: 81

Black Sabbath concert chronology
- Sabotage Tour (1975–76); Technical Ecstasy Tour (1976–77); Never Say Die! Tour (1978)

The Technical Ecstasy Tour was a concert tour by the English heavy metal band Black Sabbath. It began on 22 October 1976 and ended on 22 April 1977.

== Overview ==
=== North America leg ===
Having toned down the band's 'black magic' image for Technical Ecstasy, Geezer Butler assured Circus, "Parents can take their kids to our shows now."

=== Europe leg ===
A notorious encounter occurred between Geezer Butler and Malcolm Young of support band AC/DC when the tour reached Europe. "Flick-knives were banned in England," Butler recalled, "but, when we were playing in Switzerland, I bought one. I was just flicking it, when Malcolm Young came up to me and started slagging Sabbath… He came over and said, 'You must think you're big, having a flick-knife.' I said, 'What are you talking about?' And that was it. Nobody got hurt."

AC/DC's support slot had, in any case, begun inauspiciously. "All the gear was blowing up," reported Angus Young of their first show, in Paris. "We played about twenty minutes then destroyed the stage."

== Tour dates ==
List of 1976 concerts
Date	City	Country	Venue
22 October 1976	Tulsa	United States	Tulsa Assembly Center Arena
23 October 1976	Houston	United States	Sam Houston Coliseum
24 October 1976	San Antonio	United States	Convention Center Arena
26 October 1976	Dallas	United States	Dallas Memorial Auditorium
28 October 1976	Des Moines	United States	Veterans Memorial Audtiorium
29 October 1976	Lincoln	United States	Pershing Memorial Auditorium
30 October 1976	Kansas City	United States	Memorial Hall
31 October 1976	Denver	United States	McNichols Sports Arena
1 November 1976	Phoenix	United States	Arizona Veterans Memorial Coliseum
2 November 1976	San Francisco	United States	Winterland Ballroom
3 November 1976	Santa Monica	United States	Santa Monica Civic Auditorium
4 November 1976	Bakersfield	United States	Bakersfield Civic Auditorium
5 November 1976	San Diego	United States	San Diego Sports Arena
6 November 1976	Long Beach	United States	Long Beach Arena
7 November 1976	San Bernardino	United States	Swing Auditorium
9 November 1976	Fresno	United States	Selland Arena
11 November 1976	Portland	United States	Veterans Memorial Coliseum
12 November 1976	Spokane	United States	Spokane Coliseum
13 November 1976	Seattle	United States	Seattle Center Arena
23 November 1976	Knoxville	United States	Knoxville Civic Coliseum
24 November 1976	Chicago	United States	International Amphitheatre
25 November 1976	Charleston	United States	Charleston Civic Center
26 November 1976	Detroit	United States	Cobo Center
28 November 1976	Richfield	United States	Richfield Coliseum
29 November 1976	Chicago	United States	International Amphitheatre
30 November 1976	Kalamazoo	United States	Wings Stadium
1 December 1976	Providence	United States	Providence Civic Center
2 December 1976	Providence	United States	Providence Civic Center
3 December 1976	Boston	United States	Music Hall
4 December 1976	Philadelphia	United States	Spectrum
6 December 1976	New York	United States	Madison Square Garden
7 December 1976	Springfield	United States	Civic Center
8 December 1976	Pittsburgh	United States	Civic Arena
9 December 1976	Landover	United States	Capital Centre
10 December 1976	Niagara Falls	United States	Niagara Falls Convention Center
11 December 1976	New Haven	United States	New Haven Coliseum
12 December 1976	Syracuse	War Memorial Auditorium	

List of 1977 concerts
Date	City	Country	Venue
20 January 1977	Miami	United States	Miami Jai-Alai Fronton Arena
25 January 1977	Birmingham	United States	Boutwell Memorial Auditorium
26 January 1977	Atlanta	United States	Omni Coliseum
28 January 1977	Memphis	United States	Mid-South Coliseum
29 January 1977	Charlotte	United States	Charlotte Coliseum
30 January 1977	Fayetteville	United States	Cumberland County Memorial Arena
2 February 1977	Norfolk, Virginia	United States	Norfolk Scope
4 February 1977	Cincinnati	United States	Riverfront Coliseum
6 February 1977	Erie	United States	Erie County Field House
7 February 1977	Salem	United States	Salem Civic Center
9 February 1977	Columbus	United States	Veterans Memorial Auditorium
10 February 1977	Nashville	United States	Nashville Municipal Auditorium
11 February 1977	Terre Haute	United States	Hulman Center
12 February 1977	St. Louis	United States	Kiel Auditorium
13 February 1977	Springfield	United States	Hammons Student Center
14 February 1977	Indianapolis	United States	Indiana Convention Center
15 February 1977	Fort Wayne	United States	Allen County War Memorial Coliseum
16 February 1977	Little Rock	United States	Barton Coliseum
18 February 1977	Lexington	United States	Rupp Arena
20 February 1977	San Francisco	United States	Winterland
23 February 1977	Inglewood	United States	Inglewood Forum
2 March 1977	Glasgow	Scotland	The Apollo
4 March 1977	Newcastle	England	Newcastle City Hall
6 March 1977	Stafford	England	New Bingley Hall
7 March 1977	Liverpool	England	Liverpool Empire Theatre
9 March 1977	Cardiff	Wales	Capitol Theatre
10 March 1977	Southampton	England	Southampton Gaumont Theatre
12 March 1977	London	England	Hammersmith Odeon
13 March 1977	London	England	Hammersmith Odeon
14 March 1977	London	England	Hammersmith Odeon
15 March 1977	London	England	Hammersmith Odeon
5 April 1977	Paris	France	Pavillon de Paris
6 April 1977	Colmar	France	Colmar Expo Hall
7 April 1977	Offenbach	West Germany	Stadthalle Offenbach (Easter Rock Festival)
9 April 1977	Cologne	West Germany	Sporthalle (Easter Rock Festival)
10 April 1977	Nuremberg	West Germany	Messezentrum (Easter Rock Festival)
11 April 1977	Ludwigshafen	West Germany	Friedrich-Ebert-Halle (Easter Rock Festival)
13 April 1977	Thonex	Switzerland	Thonex Party Hall
14 April 1977	Zürich	Switzerland	Volkshaus
15 April 1977	Odense	Denmark	Fyns Forum
16 April 1977	Brussels	Belgium	Cirque Royal
17 April 1977	Amsterdam	Netherlands	RAI Arena
18 April 1977	Hamburg	West Germany	Ernst-Merck-Halle
19 April 1977	Copenhagen	Denmark	Falkoner Center
21 April 1977	Lund	Sweden	Olympen
22 April 1977	Gothenburg	Sweden	Scandinavium
~~24 April 1977~~	~~Helsinki~~	~~Finland~~	~~House of Culture~~

=== Box office score data ===
List of box office score data with date, city, venue, attendance, gross, references
Date	City	Venue	Attendance	Gross	Ref(s)
8 December 1976	Pittsburgh, United States	Civic Arena	15,000 / 15,000	$112,500	
10 December 1976	Niagara Falls, United States	Niagara Falls Convention Center	8,012	$52,078	
11 December 1976	New Haven, United States	New Haven Coliseum	7,800	$53,500	

== Personnel ==
- Ozzy Osbourne – vocals
- Tony Iommi – guitar
- Geezer Butler — bass
- Bill Ward – drums
- Gerald Woodroffe – keyboards
