= Accountable Beasts =

Studio album by Bill Ward
- Released: 25 April 2015
- Genres: Heavy metal, hard rock
- Length: 41:32
- Label: Aston Cross Music
- Producers: Kevin Keller & Bill Ward

Bill Ward chronology
When the Bough Breaks (1997)	Accountable Beasts (2015)

Professional ratings
Review scores
Source	Rating
Classic Rock	7/10 stars
Classic Rock Revisited	A

Accountable Beasts is the third solo album by Black Sabbath drummer Bill Ward. It was released as a digital download on 25 April 2015, 18 years after his previous solo album, When the Bough Breaks.

== Background ==
After recording his second solo album, When the Bough Breaks, in 1996, Ward found himself without a record contract or means of publishing the album. During this period, he began work on a third solo album, titled Beyond Aston. When the Bough Breaks was eventually released in 1997, and Ward continued to work on Beyond Aston sporadically for a number of years. In 2008, Ward started work on Accountable Beasts as a means of taking a break from Beyond Aston. He first announced that he was working on the album in September 2013 and it was released on 25 April 2015.

The song "Straws" was previously given a limited release as a charity single in 2002.

== Track listing ==
All tracks are written by Bill Ward.

Accountable Beasts track listing
No.	Title	Length
1.	"Leaf Killers"	4:38
2.	"Accountable Beasts"	3:15
3.	"Katastrophic World"	4:14
4.	"D.O.T.H."	4:12
5.	"First Day Back"	3:55
6.	"As It Is in Heaven"	2:25
7.	"Ashes"	5:32
8.	"Straws"	3:02
9.	"The Wall of Death"	10:15
Total length:		41:32

== Musicians ==
- Bill Ward – vocals, drums, keyboards
- Keith Lynch – guitar, bass, keyboards, vocals
- Paul Ill – bass
- Ronnie Ciago – drums, percussion
- Walter Earl – percussion
