= Ward One: Along the Way =

Studio album by Bill Ward
- Released: 10 January 1990
- Recorded: 1989
- Genre: Heavy metal
- Length: 49:09
- Labels: Chameleon, Capitol (US)
- Producer: Peter R. Kelsey

Bill Ward chronology
Ward One: Along the Way (1990)	When the Bough Breaks (1997)

Alternative cover
- The original print cover art

Professional ratings
Review scores
Source	Rating
Allmusic	4.5/5 stars

Ward One: Along the Way is the debut studio album by former Black Sabbath and English heavy metal drummer Bill Ward. Originally released January 10, 1990, it features a wide array of guest musicians, including then-former Black Sabbath band member Ozzy Osbourne.

== Cover art issue ==
As originally released, Ward One featured a cover art image with a white background and a "one man band" motif. Bill Ward has stated in interviews and on his website that this artwork was not intended to be the proper artwork, and was replaced for a reprint with a much more somber "black" cover. Shortly after the black cover was issued, the record label (Chameleon) went out of business, and as such, the black cover art, while being Bill's preferred, is much harder to come by than the white one. The cover image for the white version does remain in the black version, albeit as interior artwork.

== Track listing ==
1. "(Mobile) Shooting Gallery" (Ward, Phillips, Lynch) – 5:11
2. "Short Stories" (Ward, M. Bruce) – 1:06
3. "Bombers (Can Open Bomb Bays)" (Ward, Phillips, Lynch) – 4:23
4. "Pink Clouds an Island" (Ward) – 3:15
5. "Light Up the Candles (Let There Be Peace Tonight)" (Ward, Phillips, J. Bruce) – 3:35
6. "Snakes & Ladders" (Ward, Phillips) – 6:35
7. "Jack's Land" (Ward, Yeager) – 4:41
8. "Living Naked" (Ward, Lynch) – 6:03
9. "Music For a Raw Nerve Ending" (Ward) – 2:05
10. "Tall Stories" (Ward, Lynch) – 5:04
11. "Sweep" (Ward) – 4:00
12. "Along the Way" (Ward, Phillips, Lynch) – 3:09

== Musicians ==
- Bill Ward – drums (3–4,6–12); vocals (1–2,4,6–12); keyboards (4,8); percussion (5,9); piano (6,9)
- Mike Slarve – voice & effects (1,3)
- Nickie Slarve – voice & effects (1)
- Rick Caughron – voice & effects (1)
- Lorraine Perry – vocals (10); backing vocals (3)
- Ozzy Osbourne – vocals (3,7)
- Peter Kelsey – harmony vocals (8)
- Keith Lynch – guitar (1,3,5–6,8–12); vocals (10)
- Rue Phillips – guitar (1,3,6,11 – 12); vocals (1,6,8,10–11); slide guitar (10)
- Zakk Wylde – guitar (4)
- Malcolm Bruce – guitar (5)
- Lanny Cordola – guitar (7)
- Richard Ward – guitar solo (11)
- Marco Mendoza – bass (1,6,8–9,11)
- Gordon Copley – bass (1,4,12)
- Bob Daisley – bass (3,7)
- Jack Bruce – bass & vocals (5,10)
- Lee Faulkner: bass (11)
- Eric Singer – drums (1,4)
- Leonice Shinneman – percussion (4,5,10)
- Steve Freidman – didgeridoo (10)
- Mike Rodgers – keyboards (1,3–4,10–12)
- Jimmy Yeager – keyboards (7)
- Malcolm Bruce – piano (2)
- Bob Applebaum – mandolin (3)
- Dave Gage – harmonica (10)
- Frank Silvagni – harmonica (10)
