= Never Say Die! Tour (Black Sabbath) =

1978 concert tour by Black Sabbath

- Tour by Black Sabbath
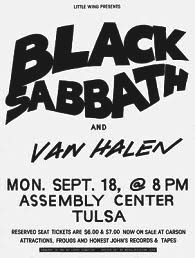
- Ad for the concert in Tulsa, Oklahoma
- Location: Europe; North America
- Associated album: Never Say Die!
- Start date: 16 May 1978
- End date: 11 December 1978
- Legs: 4
- No. of shows: 100

Black Sabbath concert chronology
- Technical Ecstasy Tour (1976–77); Never Say Die! Tour (1978); Heaven & Hell Tour (1980–81)

The Never Say Die! Tour was a concert tour by the English heavy metal band Black Sabbath. The tour began on 16 May 1978 in Sheffield and ended on 11 December 1978 in Albuquerque, New Mexico. It was the last full tour with Ozzy Osbourne until the band reunited for Ozzfest 1997.

== Background ==
=== Europe (1st leg) ===
Van Halen opened. "We did 23 shows in 25 days," recalled Eddie Van Halen. "I didn't know they had that many places! But to meet Tony Iommi when I was so into him was really incredible." David Lee Roth summed up the experience as "a real shot in the ass". The Liverpool Empire Theatre date was attended by future members of Apollo 440 – who, in 1997, issued an adaptation of Van Halen's 'Ain't Talkin' 'bout Love' as 'Ain't Talkin' 'bout Dub'.

"We had a great time with the Sabbath guys…" recalled Alex Van Halen. "It was really special because Ed and I were big fans of the band. Every time they came to LA, I was out there in the audience, fighting tooth and nail to get to the front so I could get my eardrums destroyed. But I learnt a lot from them about audience participation… One time, we were up near Leicester, about half an hour before showtime, and Ozzy and Bill Ward were out there on the front lawn with the punters, having a beer. I thought, 'Fuck me, none of this star-type shit.' I was really impressed."

"Ozzy used to tell a funny story…" recalled onetime Osbourne sidekick Don Airey. "Sabbath had done a tour for a year [sic] with Kiss… and it nearly killed him because Kiss had been so good. And he said, 'We're never doing that again. Next tour, we just want a bar band from LA. That's all we want.' And then he got to the first gig. Ozzy said they walked in as 'Eruption' was going on. Ozzy said, 'We just went into the dressing room. We sat there going, That was incredible… and then it finished, and we were just too stunned to speak. Then there was a knock on the door and the best-looking man in the world walked in and said, Hello' – you know, David Lee Roth. I think they only lasted about two months on that tour. Then the record broke… I went to see them at the Rainbow when they supported Sabbath. By the time they played the Rainbow again a month later, they were headlining. Incredible!"

Support for the end of the UK leg of the tour was from psychedelic punk group Tanz Der Youth who received a hostile response from the audience.

=== North America (1st leg) ===
"At all our shows on this tour," Ozzy told Circus, "there's one guy that gives me the evil eye. It's not the same guy at each show – at least I don't think it's the same guy. But it's kind of frightening to feel those vibes." Of the tour, he said: "The crowds are going fucking wild. In Cape Cod the other night [4 September], they were going fucking insane. Man, it was scary up there. We didn't expect this response." Van Halen, he said, "are so good they ought to be headlining the tour."

== Tour dates ==
List of 1978 concerts
Date	City	Country	Venue
16 May 1978	Sheffield	England	Sheffield City Hall
17 May 1978	Southport	England	Southport Theatre
18 May 1978	Glasgow	Scotland	The Apollo
19 May 1978	Aberdeen	Scotland	Capitol Theatre
21 May 1978	Newcastle	England	Newcastle City Hall
22 May 1978	Manchester	England	Manchester Apollo
23 May 1978	Stoke	England	Victoria Hall
25 May 1978	Portsmouth	England	Portsmouth Guildhall
26 May 1978	Bristol	England	Colston Hall
27 May 1978	Lewisham	England	Lewisham Odeon
28 May 1978	Ipswich	England	Ipswich Gaumont Theatre
30 May 1978	Coventry	England	Coventry Theatre
31 May 1978	Leicester	England	De Montfort Hall
1 June 1978	Hammersmith	England	Hammersmith Odeon
2 June 1978	Oxford	England	Apollo Theatre Oxford
3 June 1978	Southampton	England	Southampton Gaumont Theatre
5 June 1978	Birmingham	England	Birmingham Odeon
7 June 1978	Bradford	England	St George's Hall
8 June 1978	Preston	England	Preston Guild Hall
10 June 1978	Hammersmith	England	Hammersmith Odeon
12 June 1978	Birmingham	England	Birmingham Odeon
13 June 1978	Birmingham	England	Birmingham Odeon
14 June 1978	Manchester	England	Manchester Apollo
15 June 1978	Manchester	England	Manchester Apollo
16 June 1978	Bridlington	England	Royal Hall
17 June 1978	Liverpool	England	Liverpool Empire Theatre
19 June 1978	Hammersmith	England	Hammersmith Odeon Theatre
22 August 1978	Milwaukee	United States	MECCA Arena
23 August 1978	Chicago	United States	International Amphitheatre
24 August 1978	Chicago	United States	International Amphitheatre
25 August 1978	Terre Haute	United States	Hulman Arena
27 August 1978	New York City	United States	Madison Square Garden
28 August 1978	Hempstead	United States	Nassau Coliseum
29 August 1978	Philadelphia	United States	Spectrum
31 August 1978	Erie	United States	Erie County Field House
1 September 1978	Hampton	United States	Hampton Coliseum
2 September 1978	Pittsburgh	United States	Civic Arena
4 September 1978	South Yarmouth	United States	Cape Cod Coliseum
5 September 1978	Portland	United States	Cumberland County Civic Arena
7 September 1978	Utica	United States	Utica Memorial Auditorium
8 September 1978	Niagara Falls	United States	Niagara Falls Civic Center
9 September 1978	Baltimore	United States	Baltimore Civic Center
10 September 1978	New Haven	United States	New Haven Coliseum
12 September 1978	Indianapolis	United States	Indiana Convention Center
14 September 1978	Detroit	United States	Cobo Center
15 September 1978	Richfield	United States	Richfield Coliseum
16 September 1978	St. Louis	United States	Checkerdome
17 September 1978	Kansas City	United States	Kansas City Municipal Arena
18 September 1978	Tulsa	United States	Tulsa Assembly Center
21 September 1978	Bakersfield	United States	Bakersfield Convention Center
22 September 1978	Fresno	United States	Selland Arena
23 September 1978	Anaheim	United States	Anaheim Stadium (Summerfest)
24 September 1978	Anaheim	United States	Anaheim Stadium (Summerfest)
26 September 1978	Vancouver	Canada	Pacific Coliseum
27 September 1978	Portland	United States	Veterans Memorial Coliseum
28 September 1978	Spokane	United States	Spokane Coliseum
29 September 1978	Seattle	United States	Seattle Center Arena
30 September 1978	Seattle	United States	Seattle Center Arena
9 October 1978	Hamburg	West Germany	Audimax Theatre
10 October 1978	Essen	West Germany	Grugahalle
11 October 1978	Offenbach	West Germany	Stadthalle Offenbach
13 October 1978	Uhingen	West Germany	Haldenberg Hall
14 October 1978	Ludwigshafen	West Germany	Friedrich-Ebert-Halle
15 October 1978	Kuernach	West Germany	Kuernach Hall
17 October 1978	Neunkirchen	West Germany	Hemmerleinhalle
18 October 1978	Bad Rappenau	West Germany	Bad Rappenau Sports Hall
20 October 1978	Cambrai	France	Grottos Palace
3 November 1978	St. Petersburg	United States	Bayfront Center
4 November 1978	Jacksonville	United States	Jacksonville Coliseum
5 November 1978	Pembroke Pines	United States	Hollywood Sportatorium
8 November 1978	Birmingham	United States	Boutwell Memorial Auditorium
10 November 1978	Memphis	United States	Mid-South Coliseum
11 November 1978	Cincinnati	United States	Riverfront Coliseum
12 November 1978	Nashville	United States	Nashville Municipal Auditorium
13 November 1978	Atlanta	United States	Omni Coliseum
14 November 1978	Mobile	United States	Mobile Municipal Arena
15 November 1978	Huntsville	United States	Von Braun Center
17 November 1978	Austin	United States	Austin Municipal Auditorium
18 November 1978	Midland	United States	Chaparral Center
19 November 1978	Houston	United States	Sam Houston Coliseum
20 November 1978	Oklahoma City	United States	Myriad Convention Center
22 November 1978	Corpus Christi	United States	Memorial Coliseum
23 November 1978	Houston	United States	Sam Houston Coliseum
24 November 1978	San Antonio	United States	San Antonio Convention Center Arena
25 November 1978	Dallas	United States	Dallas Convention Center Arena
26 November 1978	Dallas	United States	Dallas Convention Center Arena
28 November 1978	Denver	United States	McNichols Sports Arena
29 November 1978	Ogden	United States	Dee Events Center
1 December 1978	San Bernardino	United States	Swing Auditorium
2 December 1978	Oakland	United States	Oakland Arena
3 December 1978	San Diego	United States	San Diego Sports Arena
4 December 1978	Long Beach	United States	Long Beach Arena
5 December 1978	Phoenix	United States	Arizona Veterans Memorial Coliseum
7 December 1978	Abilene	United States	Taylor County Expo Center
8 December 1978	El Paso	United States	El Paso County Coliseum
10 December 1978	Albuquerque	United States	Johnson Gymnasium
11 December 1978	Albuquerque	United States	Johnson Gymnasium

=== Box office score data ===
List of box office score data with date, city, venue, attendance, gross, references
Date (1978)	City	Venue	Attendance	Gross	Ref(s)
September 4	South Yarmouth	Cape Cod Coliseum	7,100	$53,888	
September 5	Portland	Cumberland County Civic Center	7,744	$57,606	
September 8	Niagara Falls	Convention Center	8,186	$62,267	
September 9	Baltimore	Civic Center	9,253	$65,887	
September 10	New Haven	Coliseum	7,438	$52,289	

== Personnel ==
- Tony Iommi – guitar
- Geezer Butler – bass
- Bill Ward – drums
- Ozzy Osbourne – lead vocals
