= Live at Last (Black Sabbath album) =

Live album by Black Sabbath
- Released: June 1980
- Recorded: 11 March 1973 at the Hardrock Concert Theatre, Manchester; 16 March 1973 at the Rainbow Theatre, London
- Genre: Heavy metal
- Length: 57:08
- Label: NEMS
- Producer: Patrick Meehan

Black Sabbath chronology
Heaven and Hell (1980)	Live at Last (1980)	Mob Rules (1981)

Professional ratings
Review scores
Source	Rating
AllMusic	2/5 stars

Live at Last is a 1980 live album by the English heavy metal band Black Sabbath. Despite its wide distribution and success (it peaked at No. 5 on the UK Albums Chart), the album was released without the permission or knowledge of the band. It was, however, released legally by the band's former manager Patrick Meehan who owned the rights to the recording. It was re-released officially, with the approval of the band, on 20 August 2002 (in the US) as disc 1 of the two-disc Past Lives set.

The nature of the album's initial release as being without the band's approval is demonstrated by a notoriously embarrassing goof in the original version, which falsely credited the singer as "Ossie Osbourne".

== Background ==
After dismissing manager Patrick Meehan in the late 1970s, Black Sabbath became embroiled in a long legal dispute with their former management. Later, in 1980, Meehan arranged the reissue of the entire Black Sabbath catalogue, and the release of a live album of old recordings, all on the NEMS label without the band's consent. The live album consisted of 1973 concert recordings the band intended to use for a live album, but shelved indefinitely after being unhappy with the recording.

The release of Live at Last, combined with the 1982 release of Ozzy Osbourne's Speak of the Devil live album consisting entirely of Black Sabbath songs, prompted Black Sabbath to release their first official live album, 1982's Live Evil.

== Recording ==
During the band's Volume 4 tour, the concerts held on 11 March 1973 at the Hardrock Concert Theatre in Manchester, and 16 March 1973 at the Rainbow Theatre in London, were recorded for use in a planned live album release, but the project was ultimately scrapped despite its plans being already promoted in UK newspaper articles. Despite the liner notes of a 1996 reissue of Live at Last stating the Manchester concert was held at the Free Trade Hall, this is easily proven incorrect when referencing historical documentation such as tour listings and ticket stubs.

== Release history ==
Remastered versions of the original Live at Last recording have been released since the 1990s by various record labels. In the liner notes of the reissue on CD by Castle Communications in 1996, it is stated that the recordings were taken at Free Trade Hall in Manchester, and at the Rainbow Theatre in North London. This album was re-released by Sanctuary Records in 2002 as the first CD of Past Lives. Past Lives itself was re-released again in 2010 in a "Deluxe Edition". According to the Past Lives liner notes, the Live at Last performance was recorded on the 11 and 16 of March 1973.

== Reviews and responses ==
The album has received a mixed to negative review from AllMusic, with critic Alex Henderson stating that he found the band "in decent form" but criticizing the shortness of the release and the absence of some of Black Sabbath's best known material such as "Iron Man" and their title track "Black Sabbath". Mixed to positive reviews have appeared in the Encyclopaedia Metallum.

== Track listing ==
All tracks are written by Ozzy Osbourne, Tony Iommi, Geezer Butler, and Bill Ward.

Side A
No.	Title	Length
1.	"Tomorrow's Dream"	3:04
2.	"Sweet Leaf"	5:27
3.	"Killing Yourself to Live"	5:29
4.	"Cornucopia"	3:57
5.	"Snowblind"	4:47
6.	"Embryo / Children of the Grave" ("Embryo" not listed on the sleeve)	4:32

Side B
No.	Title	Length
7.	"War Pigs"	7:38
8.	"Wicked World" (A medley/jam that contains parts of "Into the Void", "Sometimes I'm Happy", "Supernaut" and a drum solo; transitions back into "Wicked World". Only "Wicked World" is listed on the sleeve and label.)	18:59
9.	"Paranoid"	3:10

=== Live In the UK 1973 ===
On 12 February 2021, Vol. 4 was reissued as a "Super Deluxe" edition in 4 CD and 5 LP formats with alternate mixes, outtakes and studio dialogue. In addition to the studio outtakes and new mixes, the original analog tape recordings from 11 March 1973 at the Hardrock Concert Theatre and 16 March 1973 at the Rainbow Theatre in London which were used for Live at Last were remixed and remastered for inclusion as the last CD/last 2 LP in the set. With this release, an additional 12 minutes of audio has been added due to some different selections from the concerts being used as well as leaving in more stage banter and tune ups from the band. The remastered selections from the concerts were reordered to create a more accurate representation of a 1973 Black Sabbath concert, as Live at Last changed the track listing.

2021 Vol. 4 Super Deluxe, Disc Four (Live in the UK 1973)
No.	Title	Length
1.	"Tomorrow's Dream"	3:21
2.	"Sweet Leaf"	5:31
3.	"War Pigs"	7:52
4.	"Snowblind"	5:17
5.	"Killing Yourself to Live"	5:45
6.	"Cornucopia"	4:55
7.	"Wicked World (Includes Excerpts of: Guitar Solo, Orchid, Into the Void and Sometimes I'm Happy)"	19:57
8.	"Supernaut / Drum Solo"	3:57
9.	"Wicked World (Reprise)"	2:17
10.	"Embryo"	0:23
11.	"Children of the Grave"	5:37
12.	"Paranoid"	4:11

== Personnel ==
- Ozzy Osbourne – vocals
- Tony Iommi – guitars
- Geezer Butler – bass guitar
- Bill Ward – drums

Album sleeve design by Dave Field

== Charts ==
Chart (1980)	Peak position
Swedish Albums (Sverigetopplistan)	26
UK Albums (Official Charts)	5
