= When the Bough Breaks (album) =

Studio album by Bill Ward
- Released: 27 April 1997
- Recorded: 1997
- Genres: Heavy metal, hard rock
- Length: 66:53
- Label: Cleopatra
- Producer: Peter R. Kelsey

Bill Ward chronology
| Ward One: Along the Way (1990) | When the Bough Breaks (1997) | Accountable Beasts (2015) |

Alternative cover
- Original print cover art

Professional ratings
Review scores
| Source | Rating |
|---|---|
| Allmusic | 4/5 stars |

When the Bough Breaks is the second solo album by Black Sabbath drummer Bill Ward. It was originally released on April 27, 1997, on Cleopatra Records. It is his only album to date where he does not play any drums, relegating duties to Ronnie Ciago.

== Track listing ==
1. "Hate" – 5:00
2. "Children Killing Children" – 3:51
3. "Growth" – 5:45
4. "When I was a Child" – 4:54
5. "Please Help Mommy (She's a Junkie)" – 6:40
6. "Shine" – 5:06
7. "Step Lightly (On the Grass)" – 5:59
8. "Love & Innocence" – 1:00
9. "Animals" – 6:32
10. "Nighthawks Stars & Pines" – 6:45
11. "Try Life" – 5:35
12. "When the Bough Breaks" – 9:45

CD Cleopatra CL9981 (US 1997)

== Musicians ==
- Bill Ward – vocals, lyrics, musical arrangements
- Keith Lynch – guitars
- Chuck Kavooras – Dobro [slide]
- Paul Ill – bass, double bass, synthesizer, tape loops
- Ronnie Ciago – drums

== Cover art and reprint issues ==
As originally released, this album featured cover art that had two roses on it. After it was released, Bill Ward (as with Ward One, his first solo album) stated on his website that the released cover art was not the correct one that was intended to be released. Additionally, the liner notes for the original edition had lyrics that were printed so small, most people needed a magnifying glass to read them. This was eventually corrected in 2000 when the version of the album with Bill on the cover from the 1970s was released. The album was later released in a special digipak style of case, but this was later said to have been released prematurely, and was withdrawn.
