= Bill Ward (musician) =

English drummer (born 1948)

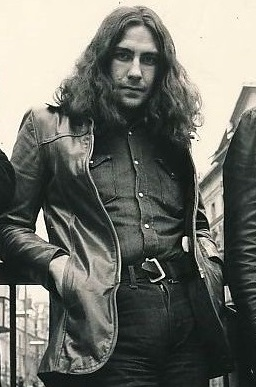
- Ward in 1970

Background information
- Born: William Thomas Ward; 5 May 1948 (age 78); Aston, Birmingham, England
- Genres: Heavy metal; blues rock; hard rock
- Occupation: Musician
- Instruments: Drums, vocals
- Years active: 1966–1984; 1989–present
- Formerly of: Mythology; Black Sabbath
- Website: billward.com

William Thomas Ward (born 5 May 1948) is an English drummer. He is the original drummer of Black Sabbath, co-founding the pioneering heavy metal band in 1969 alongside Ozzy Osbourne, Tony Iommi and Geezer Butler. He has released three solo albums, the most recent being Accountable Beasts in 2015.

== Early life and career ==
Born in Aston, Birmingham on 5 May 1948, Bill Ward started to play drums as a child, listening to the big bands of the 1940s; his early influences were Gene Krupa, Buddy Rich and Louie Bellson. Later he was influenced by drummers such as Larrie Londin, Bernard Purdie, Joe Morello, Keef Hartley, Hughie Flint, John Bonham, Ringo Starr, Jim Capaldi, Clive Bunker, Mitch Mitchell, and John Densmore. In the mid-1960s Ward sang and played drums in a band called the Rest, before he and guitarist Tony Iommi played together in a band called Mythology, and upon that band's dissolution joined vocalist Ozzy Osbourne and bassist Geezer Butler, who had previously played together in a band called The Rare Breed. The new band called themselves Earth, but were soon renamed Black Sabbath. During this time Ward played occasionally with the band Bakerloo.

=== Black Sabbath ===
Bill Ward is credited as one of the four original and founding members of Black Sabbath, having played on the first eight albums with frontman Ozzy Osbourne, dubbed the "Osbourne-era". Ward would leave the band for good in 1983, occasionally making appearances until the final Black Sabbath show in 2025.

==== Black Sabbath (1970) and Paranoid (1970) ====
After recording a series of demos under the name Earth with then-manager Jim Simpson, the band was renamed Black Sabbath at the suggestion of Geezer Butler, and debuted their first album in February 1970. Butler has said that the song "N.I.B." was named after Bill Ward's beard "because it was pointy" and resembled a pen nib. Four months later, Black Sabbath recorded their follow-up Paranoid, on which Ward performed the instrumental drum solo "Rat Salad". According to Butler, the track resulted from the band having to play eight 3/4-hour spots a night in Europe early in their career. "Bill used to fill out a whole 45 minutes doing a drum solo just to get rid of that 45 minutes" he revealed to Classic Albums. "I have no idea where the title came from, though." In 1971, Butler was on record stating that the title came from a joke about Ward's hair having not been combed.

==== Master of Reality (1971) and Vol. 4 (1972) ====
Recorded and released in 1971, Master of Reality saw a heavier sound in the band in terms of production. "Master of Reality is where we found ourselves[...] I know people feel that Sabbath invented heavy metal with our debut album – and that is true to some extent. But I believe that it's with Master of Reality that we proved the potential and power of the music." Bill Ward has cited the band's intake of "uppers, downers, Quaaludes, whatever you want[...] It was after Master of Reality that I remember Geezer broaching the issue for the first time of how out of control everything had become. He started saying he was getting tired..."

After Master of Reality, the band traveled to Los Angeles, California to record Vol. 4 at the Record Plant.

Master of Reality, I always felt, was the last album in terms of the constant touring. We went around the world multiple times and we played just about everywhere. We needed to take a break, so we decided to make our next record in California, and so some of the sunshine and some of the effects of that bled into Vol. 4.

And this included the aftermath of the counter-culture; there were still a lot of people still wearing flowers in their hair – and this is in 1972 – and that was still very prominent, especially in California. Geezer, Ozzy and myself even visited a lot of the hippy ranches and communes. We’d hang out there and we’d get high, man. They were all singing and banging tambourines.

A song came out of that. We went to Laguna Beach in southern California and we came back absolutely impressed. We must have looked changed to Tony but before too long "Laguna Sunrise" appeared; he just wrote the song. And I thought, 'Oh my God! That's exactly what it was like.' He’d just taken a musical photograph of it and he must've seen it in us when we got back. He's a phenomenal songwriter; absolutely brilliant. And every time I play "Laguna Sunrise", it's smack on the money.

Things like that were a huge influence and by that time I was using cocaine and become addicted to it. I'm now in my 32nd year of being clean and sober but back then I was using a lot of cocaine on Vol. 4.

"The band were definitely in their heyday, in the sense that nobody had burnt out quite yet" recalled Ward. Struggling to record the song "Cornucopia" after "sitting in the middle of the room, just doing drugs", Ward was nearly fired. "I hated the song, there were some patterns that were just... horrible." Ward said. "I nailed it in the end, but the reaction I got was the cold shoulder from everybody. It was like, 'Well, just go home; you're not being of any use right now.' I felt like I'd blown it, I was about to get fired." The record company changed the album title from Snowblind to Vol. 4 at the last minute. "There was no Volume 1, 2 or 3, so it's a pretty stupid title, really", Ward observed.

==== Sabbath Bloody Sabbath (1973) and Sabotage (1975) ====
Bill Ward returned to England with Black Sabbath to record Sabbath Bloody Sabbath in September 1973, and it was released two months later. Ward described the album's artwork as "brilliant".

Two years after Sabbath Bloody Sabbath was released, the band recorded Sabotage. The album art featured a picture of the band with Ward in red leggings. "I had this old pair of jeans that were really dirty, so I borrowed my wife's tights"..."and so that my bollocks wouldn't be showing under the tights, I also borrowed Ozzy's underpants, because I had none." he told Classic Rock.

==== Technical Ecstasy (1976) and Never Say Die! (1978) ====
The ballad "It's Alright" on the Technical Ecstasy album was written and sung by Bill Ward. Initially reluctant to sing the song for fear of offending Osbourne, he was encouraged by the band to do it. In his autobiography, Osbourne praised the performance, enthusing, "He's got a great voice, Bill, and I was more than happy for him to do the honours." It was released as a single because, said Iommi, "We want to break out as far as we can… so we've decided to hit the singles market." It has since been covered live by Guns N' Roses, and features on their Live Era '87–'93 album. It also featured in the 2010 film It's Kind of a Funny Story.

In the summer of 1977, Ward visited Geezer Butler at his home to inform him that he had been fired from Black Sabbath after a band meeting, telling him that Iommi and Osbourne questioned his commitment. Ward later invited Butler to rehearsals which were starting the next day. When Butler returned to the band, Iommi and Osbourne both denied any involvement in his firing and Ward claimed that he had just been the messenger.

At the time of recording Never Say Die!, the band's members were struggling with heavy substance abuse. Before sessions began, vocalist Ozzy Osbourne temporarily left the band and was briefly replaced by Dave Walker, known for his work with Savoy Brown and Fleetwood Mac. Osbourne eventually returned, but refused to sing any of the material written during Walker’s tenure. One of those songs, "Swinging the Chain", was sung by Ward instead. Despite these challenges, Ward defended the album years later, suggesting the band did their best under the circumstances and even experimented creatively, particularly on tracks like "Johnny Blade" and "Air Dance". Although Ward performed vocals on Swinging the Chain, the lyrics were mistakenly credited to Butler when they were actually written by Ward himself.

Shortly after the Never Say Die! Tour in 1979, Ward was tasked with informing Osbourne that he had been fired from the band. In 2015, Ward recalled:

[...] I'm like the fucking janitor in that band. Most of the time I always got the shit jobs that nobody wanted to do. I don't do that anymore. I recognized I was co-dependent as well as being an alcoholic so I don't do shit like that anymore[...] Oz was like a brother[...] But at the time, I thought maybe I was the best guy to do it. I kind of volunteered to do it: up went my hand and it was one of the worst things I've ever done in my life, to be honest with you. I didn't want him to leave the band but I could understand the reasons why but yeah, that was a tragic day. That was the day the band imploded.

==== Heaven and Hell (1980) and Born Again (1983) ====
Bill Ward's drug and alcohol use increased throughout his tenure in Black Sabbath. By the late 1970's he was drinking during gigs, something he had never done before. He also began experiencing panic attacks. Ward has stated that he cannot remember the recording of the 1980 album Heaven and Hell due to his alcohol abuse. According to Tony Iommi, Ward walked out in the middle of the tour after a telephone call to then-Black Sabbath vocalist Ronnie James Dio informing him "I'm off then, Ron." Black Sabbath were forced to cancel their sold-out show at McNichols Sports Arena in Denver, although Blue Öyster Cult performed and received the sizeable proceeds. "I escalated into such oblivion that I just was incapable of confronting my losses and dealing with them in a healthy way..." Ward explained. "I blamed everybody and everything for my problems and I just fell apart... that's why I left the Heaven & Hell tour." Ward was replaced with Vinny Appice after the band missed six dates.

In 2015 when asked about leaving the band, Ward replied:

[...] I was absolutely missing Oz; really missing him and I wasn't coping with my grief that well because I was so drunk. My mother had died and I wasn't coping with the grief for my mother and I was feeling overwhelmed with loss[...] as much as I loved Ronnie James Dio, it didn't work for me. It didn't jive properly, especially when we were doing old Sabbath stuff. It worked when Ozzy sang it but when anybody else tried to sing old Sabbath stuff then it didn’t work. It's exactly the same when Black Sabbath go out on the road now with other drummers: it doesn't work. I'm not saying that to be rude or anything but it doesn't fucking work; it doesn't sound the same.

Ward sat out 1981's Mob Rules, briefly playing in a band called Max Havoc, before returning to Black Sabbath to record Born Again in 1983. Ward had been completely sober during those sessions, but the prospect of touring scared him and he fell back into old habits. Ward once again left the band, and he was replaced by Bev Bevan on the Born Again Tour.

There had been conversations during the Born Again sessions about going on tour, and I was barely making it through the sessions, let alone touring. The thought of touring put me in such a state of panic, anxiety and dread that I couldn't possibly face the idea… but I was too ashamed to tell everybody. And rather than tell everybody, I drank and I disappeared. I escaped. That's how I used to do things: when I couldn't handle a situation, I would just drink and just run away… I came back to the United States, got hospitalized a couple of times, ended up back on the streets and, in the early part of January 1984, I went into my final detox. And from that point on I haven't taken a drink. And I haven't used any narcotics.

He briefly rejoined Black Sabbath in 1984 to record some demos with Iommi, Geezer Butler and vocalist Dave Donato, but nothing with this line-up ever materialized. Ward gave Donato the nickname "Donut" because Donato would show up to rehearsals and eat doughnuts.

==== Sporadic appearances, Reunion (1998) and Ozzfest ====
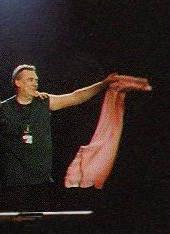
Ward onstage with Black Sabbath in Stuttgart, Germany in 1999

In 1985, Bill Ward joined the original Black Sabbath members for Live Aid, and then in 1992 for Ozzy Osbourne's retirement show in Costa Mesa, California.

Ward made a brief return to the band for the South American leg of the Cross Purposes Tour in 1994 with vocalist Tony Martin fronting.

In 1997, Osbourne, Iommi and Butler went on tour as Black Sabbath with Mike Bordin filling in on drums for Ozzfest 1997. Ward rejoined when the original line-up gathered for two shows in Birmingham that became the Reunion album. Ward had a heart condition, and concern regarding his health and ability to perform at a high level meant that former Black Sabbath drummer Vinny Appice would be on standby. "We hadn't done a show with Bill for 18 years" remarked Iommi. Ward made it through both shows – albeit not without incident:

Bill hit a gong and it fell on him, I creased up. His arm was black and blue in the morning, because those things weigh a ton. When it hit him and fell onto the kit, it sounded like someone was throwing pots and pans around. We were waiting for something like that to happen.

— Tony Iommi

Ward was again forced to skip all but the last two shows on the Ozzfest 1998 tour while he recovered from a heart attack that he suffered in May. As the band rehearsed, Ward stopped and asked for his assistant and informed the band that his arm had gone numb. Iommi and Butler then left for a short time and upon returning to the rehearsal space, a frantic Osbourne informed them "Bill has had a heart attack! Bill has had a heart attack!" Ward was temporarily replaced by Vinny Appice, and he would return for Ozzfest 1999.

In the spring of 2001, Ward, along with Osbourne, Iommi and Butler, gathered in Wales to record about six demos for producer Rick Rubin that were to be used on a Black Sabbath album. One of the songs written during this period called Scary Dreams was performed by the band on the Ozzfest 2001 tour. Plans were abandoned when Osbourne was called to work on his next solo album Down to Earth.

Ward declined to participate in the Ozzfest 2004 tour, stating that he received a proposal with "no room to negotiate". He was once again replaced by Mike Bordin. Black Sabbath's last Ozzfest tour would be in 2005 with Ward on drums.

==== Final years with Black Sabbath ====
In October 2006, news leaked that Bill Ward would be reuniting with Tony Iommi, Geezer Butler and Ronnie James Dio under the moniker "Heaven & Hell". However, Ward later decided not to participate due to musical differences with "a couple of the other bandmembers" and a reported concern about extended touring. Heaven & Hell continued with Vinny Appice on drums.

On 11 November 2011, Ward joined Ozzy Osbourne, Iommi, Butler, and Rick Rubin to announce a new album and tour as the original Black Sabbath line-up. Ward however left the project in February 2012, stating that he had failed to reach an agreement regarding his contract. In 2015, Osbourne took to Facebook and responded to Ward in an open letter, stating that Ward's decision was down to his health.

Rage Against the Machine and Audioslave drummer Brad Wilk replaced Ward for Black Sabbath's final album 13, with Tommy Clufetos assuming touring duties. Ward later admitted that his health would have been an issue.

In May 2015, Ward joined Tony Iommi and Geezer Butler as Black Sabbath to accept the Ivor Novella Lifetime Achievement award, and once again in Los Angeles in May 2019 to accept the Lifetime Achievement Grammy. Although Black Sabbath did not perform for the latter, Rival Sons covered a set.

In June 2019, Osbourne told Kerrang! that he was interested in playing with Ward again one day, saying:

I didn't like the fact that Bill Ward wasn't there, for a start. People put that down to me, but it wasn't me, honestly. We didn't have the fucking time to hang around, we had to get going, but I'm sorry it didn't work out with Bill. Tommy [Clufetos] did great, but the four of us started this, and it should have been the four of us ending it. Those final gigs in Birmingham were bittersweet because you think of how far we came, and how much we did, and it would have been good to have shared that together. Maybe one day there'll be one last gig, I don't know.

On 5 July 2025, Ward performed with Black Sabbath at Back to the Beginning at Villa Park, for what was billed as Ozzy Osbourne's final concert two weeks before his death. One week before the concert, Ward and the other original members of Black Sabbath were each made Freemen of the City of Birmingham.

=== Solo career ===
After a few years in hiatus, Bill Ward decided to return to playing music in the late 1980s. In 1989 he went to work on a solo album, which featured a huge array of guest musicians, including former Black Sabbath bandmate Ozzy Osbourne and his guitarist, Zakk Wylde. Released in January 1990, Ward One: Along the Way showcased Ward's versatility in musical tastes and abilities; he sang lead on some of the songs. It would be seven years before he released his second solo album, When the Bough Breaks, in 1997.

In 2002 he released the song Straws as a single for charity. The song would reappear on his 2015 album Accountable Beasts. Ward's surgery on his shoulder prevented him from playing drums again until May 2014, delaying his third studio album Accountable Beasts. He had also expressed a desire to tour behind the album.

=== Other projects ===
In 2000, Bill Ward appeared as a guest musician on Tony Iommi's solo album along with Ozzy Osbourne on the track Who's Fooling Who.

Since mid-2002, Ward has done a monthly internet-only radio show named Rock 50 on radio station WPMD from Cerritos College in California. Ward plays a variety of metal, hard rock, and some classic rock.

In 2016, Ward debuted a new band called Day of Errors, which played its first gig in June that year at Gaslamp in Long Beach, California. The band featured Joe Amodea on guitar/vocals and Kill Devil Hill singer Jason "Dewey" Bragg on vocals. Ward was due to play a string of dates with his Day of Errors in December 2017, but had to cancel when he was hospitalised with heart problems.

== Personal life ==
Bill Ward has been married four times. He has two sons and one daughter.

In a 2010 interview, Ward expressed his distaste for religion, saying that he grew up in a "heathen" family and did not believe in a "fire and brimstone god". He did however enjoy singing in Sunday church choirs growing up.

=== Pranks ===
Tony Iommi claims that Bill Ward almost died after a prank-gone-wrong during recording of Vol. 4 in 1972. The band were renting a Bel Air mansion belonging to John DuPont of the DuPont chemical company. The band found several spray cans of gold DuPont paint in a room of the house; finding Ward naked and unconscious after a night of heavy drinking, they thought it would be funny to cover the drummer from head to toe in gold paint. Ward soon became violently ill and had a seizure and an ambulance had to be called. The paint had blocked all of Ward's pores, which his bandmates were subsequently informed can be fatal.

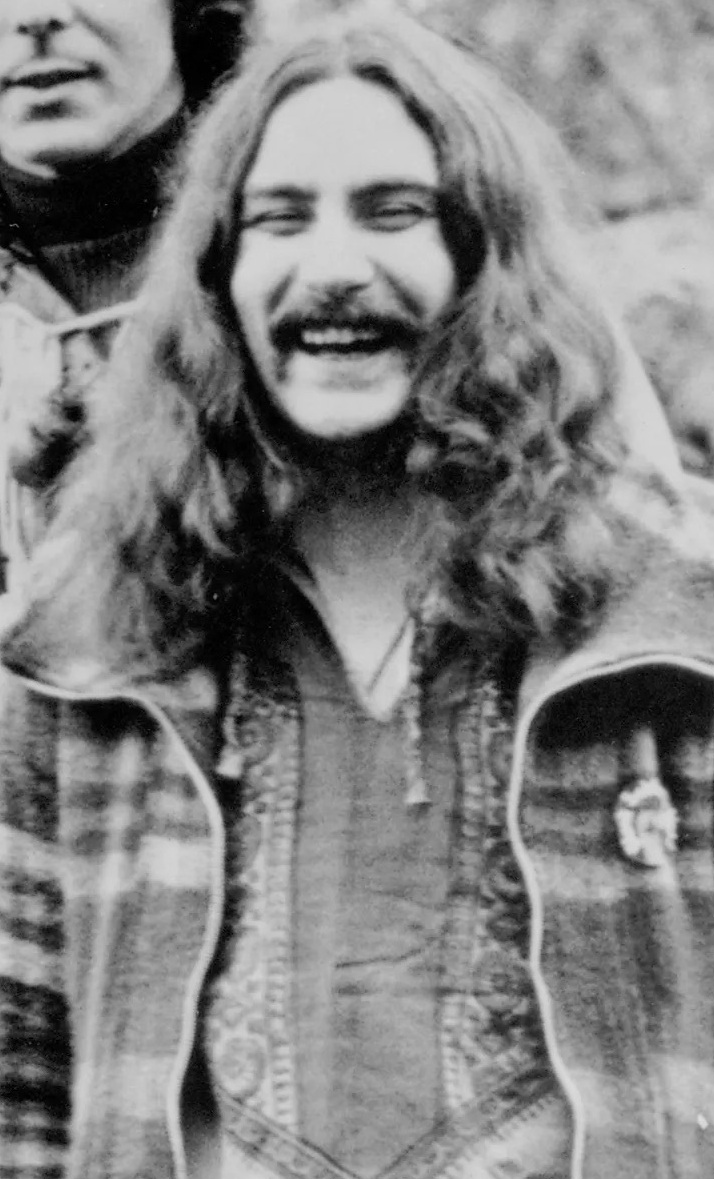
Ward with Black Sabbath in 1973

According to Iommi, he and the band would often set Ward's beard on fire. On one occasion, Ward even received third-degree burns. In an interview with Guitar World, Iommi described it as follows:

Bill and I were in the studio rehearsing one day and out of the blue I asked him, "May I set you on fire, Bill?" And he said, "Well, not now, not now." And then I forgot about it. Later on when the day ended, he said to me, "Well, I'm going home now; you still want to set me on fire or what?" And I said, "Sure." So I took a small can of lighter fluid and sprayed it on him, lit a match, and whoomph. He was wearing these polyester pants so they burned really quickly and he was on the floor screaming and crying. I could not help him because I was so busy laughing. It actually turned out to be quite serious. I felt really bad for him. He was sent to the hospital. Later on, his mother called me on the phone and said, "You barmy bastard, it's about time you grew up. Our Bill is going to have his leg off." But things like that always happened to Bill.

=== Health ===
Ward suffers bouts of agoraphobia, which has greatly affected his career. For years, he heavily drank alcohol to deal with his anxiety. Ward dramatically changed his lifestyle since Black Sabbath's heyday following a series of suicide attempts, the last of which occurred after the Christmas of 1983 when he put a loaded 12 gauge shotgun in his mouth. Tony Iommi said that Ward stopped smoking, gave up alcohol, became a vegan, and does not use drugs of any kind.

In March 1998, Ward suffered a heart attack in Wales while rehearsing with Black Sabbath and subsequently underwent an angioplasty. He spent over a month recovering in Welsh hospitals. In November 2017, Ward suffered another heart attack.

On 9 July 2026 Ward revealed on his Facebook page that he was required to use a wheelchair, but clarified that he could walk short distances and was still able to play drums.

== Legacy ==
Drumming website Totaldrumsets has listed Ward among "The 100 Most Influential Drummers Ever!" and defined him "the mastermind behind the unholy birth of heavy metal drumming".

In 2016, he was ranked 42nd in Rolling Stone's list 100 Greatest Drummers of All Time.

== Equipment ==
In the early years of Black Sabbath, Ward used Ludwig and Slingerland drum kits, as well as Zyn and Zildjian cymbals and Speedking drum pedals. Currently, he uses Tama drums, Sabian cymbals, Vic Firth drumsticks, Evans Drumheads and Gibraltar hardware.

== Discography ==
=== with Black Sabbath ===
==== Studio albums ====
- Black Sabbath (1970)
- Paranoid (1970)
- Master of Reality (1971)
- Vol. 4 (1972)
- Sabbath Bloody Sabbath (1973)
- Sabotage (1975)
- Technical Ecstasy (1976)
- Never Say Die! (1978)
- Heaven and Hell (1980)
- Born Again (1983)

==== Live albums ====
- Live at Last (1980)
- Reunion (1998)
- Past Lives (2002)

=== with Ozzy Osbourne ===
- Live & Loud (1993)

=== with Tony Iommi ===
- Iommi (2000)

=== Solo ===
- Ward One: Along the Way (1990)
- When the Bough Breaks (1997)
- Straws (single) (2002)
- The Dark Half Hour (web mix) (2004)
- Accountable Beasts (2015)

=== with Bill Ward Band ===
- Arrows (song dedicated to the victims of the 2017 Las Vegas shooting) (2019)
- Once This Was A Road (2019)
- Powder on the Moon (2020)
- Bombers "The Remake" (a remake of "Bombers Can Open Bomb Bays"), featuring drummer Walter Earl (2020)
- Mon Dieu (2022)

=== with Day of Errors ===
- Blaspheming at Creation (2017) - Day of Errors/Blaspheming at Creation
- Dark (2019)
- Ghost Train (2019)

=== with The Mezmerist ===
- The Innocent, The Forsaken, The Guilty (demo) (1983)

=== Compilations ===
- We Sold Our Soul for Rock & Roll (1975)
- The Sabbath Stones (1996)
- The Best of Black Sabbath (2000)
- Symptom of the Universe: The Original Black Sabbath 1970–1978 (2002)
- Black Box: The Complete Original Black Sabbath 1970–1978 (2004)
- Greatest Hits 1970–1978 (2006)
- Greatest Hits (2009)
- Iron Man: The Best of Black Sabbath (2012)
- The Ultimate Collection (2016)
- The Ten Year War (2017)

=== Tribute ===
- Nativity in Black: A Tribute to Black Sabbath (1994)
