= Technical Ecstasy =

1976 studio album by Black Sabbath

- Cover design by Hipgnosis

Studio album by Black Sabbath
- Released: 8 October 1976
- Recorded: June 1976
- Studio: Criteria (Miami)
- Genre: Hard rock
- Length: 40:35
- Label: Vertigo
- Producer: Black Sabbath

Black Sabbath chronology
We Sold Our Soul for Rock 'n' Roll (1976)	Technical Ecstasy (1976)	Never Say Die! (1978)

Singles from Technical Ecstasy
- 1. "It's Alright" Released: November 1976; 2. "Gypsy" Released: 1977 (Netherlands)

Technical Ecstasy is the seventh studio album by the English heavy metal band Black Sabbath, produced by guitarist Tony Iommi and released on 8 October 1976 by Warner Bros. Records in the United States and Canada and Vertigo Records elsewhere.

An attempt by the band to experiment and explore other musical territory, Technical Ecstasy features more varied and complex songs than earlier records, with prominent keyboard parts and effects. One song, the pop ballad "It's Alright", is sung by drummer Bill Ward, becoming the band's first song not sung by frontman Ozzy Osbourne.

== Composition and recording ==
After frustrating legal battles that accompanied the recording of 1975's Sabotage, Sabbath chose Miami's Criteria Studios for the making of Technical Ecstasy, which continued the band's separation from the doom and darkness that had been a trademark of their earlier albums. "Some people may have heard the band in 1970", noted Iommi, "and be thinking, 'Oh no, not them again!' But if they heard us now, they probably might like us."

In the July 2001 issue of Guitar World, Dan Epstein wrote, "The sessions proved extremely relaxing for everyone except Iommi, who was left to oversee the production while the others sunned themselves on the beach." Iommi explained to the same magazine in 1992, "We recorded the album in Miami, and nobody would take responsibility for the production. No one wanted to bring in an outside person for help, and no one wanted the whole band to produce it. So they left it all to me!"

In the liner notes to the band's 1998 live album Reunion, Phil Alexander writes that, while the band struggled to finish the album, "rock had spawned a new set of iconoclasts as the Sex Pistols, the Clash and the Damned… Suddenly Sabbath found themselves both unsure of their musical direction and labeled as has-beens." "It's not like now: If you're a heavy metal band, you put out a heavy metal album", Butler explained to Uncut in 2014. "Back then, you had to at least try to be modern and keep up. Punk was massive then and we felt that our time had come and gone."

To make matters worse for the band, manager Don Arden began spending more of his time focusing on another of his acts, Electric Light Orchestra, whose 1975 album Face The Music was their first to make the US top ten. Iommi's determination to move Sabbath in a new direction was misguided according to some, with Mick Wall noting in the 2013 book Black Sabbath: Symptom of the Universe that while future soft rock million-sellers Hotel California and Rumours were just around the corner, "to try and force that sound on Black Sabbath was like trying to put lamb's wool on a suit of armour. It just didn't work, pleasing nobody."

In his autobiography I Am Ozzy, vocalist Ozzy Osbourne admitted he had begun to consider leaving the band during this time: "I'd even had a T-shirt made with 'Blizzard of Ozz' written on the front. Meanwhile, in the studio, Tony (Iommi) was always saying, 'We've gotta sound like Foreigner', or 'We've gotta sound like Queen.' But I thought it was strange that the bands we'd once influenced were now influencing us." Osbourne also wrote that the cost of recording in Florida "was astronomical" and that he'd "lost the plot with the booze and the drugs" during the recording of Technical Ecstasy, eventually checking himself into the Stafford County Asylum on his return to England.

"That was the beginning of the end, that one", bassist Geezer Butler confessed to Guitar World in 2001. "We were managing ourselves because we couldn't trust anybody. Everybody was trying to rip us off, including the lawyers we'd hired to get us out of our legal mess. It was really just getting to us around then, and we didn't know what we were doing. And obviously, the music was suffering; you could just feel the whole thing falling apart."

While the band were recording the album, the Eagles were recording Hotel California in an adjacent studio at Criteria Studios in Miami. "Before we could start recording we had to scrape all the cocaine out of the mixing board", Geezer divulged to Uncut in 2014. "I think they'd left about a pound of cocaine in the board." The Eagles were forced to stop recording on numerous occasions because Sabbath were too loud and the sound was coming through the wall.

=== Musical styles and songs ===
Technical Ecstasy was an attempt by Black Sabbath to mature as a group and explore novel musical directions. Compared to the band's earlier albums, the record's songs are more eclectic, complex and flowery, with studio effects and synthesisers appearing prominently. Greg Prato of AllMusic applauds "the raging opener, "Back Street Kids" but then elaborates that "The band was getting further and further from their original musical path, as they began experimenting with their trademark sludge-metal sound", citing the funky "All Moving Parts (Stand Still)" and the melodic, Bill Ward-sung "It's Alright" as examples. The latter song – the first time Osbourne did not take lead vocals on a Black Sabbath track – has been compared to the work of Paul McCartney and Badfinger and its presence is divisive amongst the band’s fanbase. The prominence of guest keyboardist Gerald Woodroffe throughout the album was considered a "surprise left turn", though Steven Rosen of Sounds considers his work on the album to be "supplemental in nature", adding that "the new synthesized wheezings are nice and so long as he remains in a back-up role there should be little problem with his being accepted by the Sabbath fans."

Butler has described Technical Ecstasy as a response to punk rock. Music journalist Michael Hann disputed this, saying: "Given it was recorded in June 1976, that suggests they were either way ahead of the curve, or that Butler is mistaken." In a 2021 interview, Ward cited Technical Ecstasy in asserting the band's "punk and prog credentials" while admiring punk rock because "I came from a violent band as well." He said, "We never made music to fit into anything or to reach a certain audience" , asserting that “Tony Iommi and bassist Geezer Butler still helped deliver “big songs” in a “sonic landscape” that was “very panoramic…(a)ll the things that we had initiated in the first few albums still existed on Technical Ecstasy. The band had not lost any of its vitality…( the music) stands up and shows that we were open-minded and progressive. But you can tell it’s the same band. We didn’t jettison our loudness. Those chords on ‘You Won’t Change Me’ are huge.‘Gypsy’ is huge”.

With regard to Iommi being the only member determined to work on the album, Peter Watts of Uncut comments that Technical Ecstasy is "the sound of Tony Iommi being left to his own devices and getting pulled in several different directions at once", believing that he wished to eschew heavy metal for hard rock, while also "nodding at punk and soft rock" but still remaining "quintessentially Black Bloody Sabbath", with the resulting record combining aspects from all their earlier albums – including the drive of their earliest work and experimentation of Sabbath Bloody Sabbath (1973) – as well as a straight pop song with vocals by Ward.

Technical Ecstasy's lyrics dealt with a variety of topics. Tony Iommi's autobiography Iron Man: My Journey Through Heaven & Hell with Black Sabbath reveals that "Dirty Women" was about "all these hookers" Butler had seen around Florida. "All Moving Parts (Stand Still)" is about "a transvestite who becomes President of the United States," Butler told biographer Mick Wall in 2013, "because America was such a misogynistic society at the time." As with its previous two albums, the band continued experimenting with keyboards and synthesisers on Technical Ecstasy. The music itself was less dark and more atypical than previous albums, especially on ballads "It's Alright" and "She's Gone."

"It's Alright" was written and sung by drummer Bill Ward. Initially reluctant to sing the song for fear of offending Osbourne, he was encouraged by Iommi and Butler to do it. In his autobiography, Osbourne praises the performance, enthusing, "He's got a great voice, Bill, and I was more than happy for him to do the honours." It was released as a single because, said Iommi, "We want to break out as far as we can… so we've decided to hit the singles market." It was covered live by Guns N' Roses on their Live Era '87–'93 album. It also featured in the 2010 film It's Kind of a Funny Story.

== Artwork ==
The cover art was designed by Hipgnosis. Osbourne once described it as "two robots screwing on an escalator". Hipgnosis' Storm Thorgerson, who had been assisted by graphic designer George Hardie, discussed the cover with Zoom magazine in 1979: "We're very fond of that cover. From the title of the piece, Technical Ecstasy, I thought of something ecstatic rather than something technical, and I immediately thought of ecstasy in sexual terms: some sort of mechanical copulation, which would be tricky to do. I then thought of ecstasy as falling in love, perhaps during a brief encounter on an escalator – and, since it was 'technical', I thought of two robots ... It's really quite simple – he's just done curves for the female and hard, angular, macho lines for the male. It's really quite sexist, actually – stereotyped. Anyway, it's love at first sight, but I felt robots wouldn't do it like humans would do it, so instead they're squirting lubricating fluid at one another." The UK release had a two-sided insert of lyrics and credits.

== Tour ==
During the subsequent 1977 European tour in support of Technical Ecstasy, the band was supported by AC/DC. The relationship between bassist Geezer Butler and AC/DC rhythm guitarist Malcolm Young was quite tense. Guitarist Tony Iommi recalls the atmosphere between the two being "heavy" and that the pair did not get along at all. Ward's drum tech Graham Wright and Osbourne's personal assistant David Tangye stated in their 2004 book How Black Was Our Sabbath that the problems between the two originated after a show the two bands performed earlier in Switzerland. An altercation occurred in an hotel bar in which Butler removed a switch-blade comb from his pocket and opened it. Young thought it was a switchblade knife and believed Butler was pointing it at him. In the Bon Scott biography Highway To Hell: The Life and Times of AC/DC Legend Bon Scott, Clinton Walker writes of the tour: "Sabbath, by 1976, were well past their prime, and AC/DC were all but blowing them right off the stage. Substance abuse in the band was rampant." Graham and Tangye also disclose that during the tour drummer Ward had begun driving from gig to gig in a rented Winnebago due to a fear of flying.

Osbourne briefly left following the Technical Ecstasy Tour. Although he would eventually return for the follow-up Never Say Die!, the band temporarily replaced him with former Savoy Brown vocalist Dave Walker. The band wrote a handful of songs with Walker, and performed an early version of what would become "Junior's Eyes" on the BBC programme Look Hear with him.

== Critical reception ==
Professional ratings
Review scores
Source	Rating
AllMusic	2/5 stars
Classic Rock	3.5/5 stars
Encyclopedia of Popular Music	3/5 stars
The Great Rock Discography	5/10
The Rolling Stone Album Guide	2/5 stars
Spin Alternative Record Guide	2/10

The album received mixed reviews, with Phil Alexander writing in 1998: "While today hardcore Sabs fans defend some of the bold steps taken on Technical Ecstasy, it was a confused offering which still hit Number 13 in the UK but limped into the US charts at 52." In 2001, Guitar World was less kind, calling it perhaps the "least-loved effort of the original lineup" with the band "trying to stretch its sound in several different directions, none of them exceptionally successful". It deemed "Rock 'N' Roll Doctor" "a bad Kiss imitation", while eschewing "It's Alright" as "a sub-par Paul McCartney-style pop ballad". In 2013, Mojo magazine opined: "Technical Ecstasy is the sound of Sabbath trying to make a grown-up, radio-friendly rock record and, in some parts, it works ... Mostly, however, it doesn't with tracks like 'Back Street Kids', 'Rock 'N' Roll Doctor' and 'Dirty Women' resorting to clichéd and ill-fitting rock moves." Greg Prato of AllMusic agrees: "it was not on par with Sabbath's exceptional first five releases", but praises "Dirty Women", the "funky" "All Moving Parts (Stand Still)" and the "raging opener" "Back Street Kids".

In The Great Rock Discography (2006), Martin C. Strong bemoaned the album's "ill-advised experimentation" and believed it marked "the beginning of the end". In The Rolling Stone Album Guide (2004), Technical Ecstasy is described as "the Seventies-era Sabbath album least likely to be found in a hard-rock fan's collection. It's not horrible, but you wonder if anyone in the band remembers making it. Is it an ill-fated attempt to snag some of the boogie-rock money that Ted Nugent was rolling around in? Or had they just run out of steam? Tony Iommi's guitar is the only thing left alive." In his Uncut piece, Watts wrote: "Punk is on the horizon and Sabbath try reinvention, with mixed results." Writing in the Spin Alternative Record Guide (1995), Rob Michaels deemed Technical Ecstasy far inferior to the surrounding Sabbath records, adding: "While the album's aimless synthesized wankery is arguably technical, ecstasy comes only to those who consign its cover to permanent dope de-seeding detail."

In 1992, Iommi admitted to Guitar World: "Black Sabbath fans generally don't like much of Technical Ecstasy. It was really a no-win situation for us. If we had stayed the same, people would have said we were still doing the same old stuff. So we tried to get a little more technical, and it just didn't work out very well."

In rankings of the band's albums, Technical Ecstasy was listed 10th by Eduardo Rivadavia of Ultimate Classic Rock, 11th by Paul Elliott of Classic Rock, and 13th by John Hadusek of Consequence of Sound, Nick Ruskell of Kerrang!, and Michael Hann of The Guardian. Hadusek believed Technical Ecstasy marked "where Black Sabbath changed, and not for the better", adding: "On one hand, the songs had become more complex, flowery, and aurally varied — nothing wrong there. But it’s awkwardly executed by Iommi, who produced the album. Instead of coming off as progressive, these experiments reek of a band losing touch with the traits that made them great. The studio effects and synthesizers often overtake the bass and guitar." Ruskell believes the album is "actually pretty good", despite its reputation as the first Black Sabbath album to reveal "cracks", but still believed it lacked the "hungry, stoned-out blues" of the band's first three albums, or the "coke-guzzling creativity" of the next three. Rivaavia called it a "bold but ill-fated attempt to mature and explore novel musical directions", believing it could have been comparable to Sabbath Bloody Sabbath (1973) if not for "the largely unimpressive songs to carry those innovations to fruition" Elliott believes that it was the first album on which the band "faltered", believing some songs, such as "Back Street Kids", to be "hokey", but adding that there are several great songs, including "Dirty Women" and the ballad "It's Alright". Hann wrote that while "Back Street Kids" may back Butler's claim that the album was a response to punk, "most of the rest of Technical Ecstasy was a mess."

In a review of the 2021 reissue album in Louder Sound fanzine, Dave Everley reflects on the group’s career trajectory, observing that "Sabbath lore has it that that seventh album was the point where the whole edifice that was the Ozzy era started to crumble. Certainly it sounded like the work of a band who had spent half a decade flogging themselves into the ground and had to be dragged, groaning, out of the cocaine igloo they’d built around themselves to make a new record."

"The original album", he opines, "remains as hit-and-miss as ever. Meat-and-potato rockers "Back Street Kid" (and) "Rock’N’Roll Doctor"...are weighed down by the kind of tired riffs and clichéd lyrics that Sabbath had previously left to lesser mortals", going on to observe that "(i)t’s when they head off-piste that things get interesting: "All Moving Parts (Stand Still)" is…enlivened by an uncharacteristically funky, Stevie Wonder-inspired bass line; the heavily orchestrated "She’s Gone" sounds like it was written for the world’s bleakest Disney film; and the Beatles-y, Bill Ward-sung "It’s Alright" shows that the drummer really was the beating heart of the band. Best of all is "You Won’t Change Me", an epic cri de cœur that’s one part defiance and one part desperation.”

The box set reissue, he concludes, "won’t suddenly re-frame Technical Ecstasy as Sabbath’s great lost masterpiece, but it does go some way to boosting its reputation."

== Track listing ==
All tracks are written by Tony Iommi, Geezer Butler, Bill Ward and Ozzy Osbourne.

Side A
No.	Title	Length
1.	"Back Street Kids"	3:47
2.	"You Won't Change Me"	6:36
3.	"It's Alright"	4:04
4.	"Gypsy"	5:14

Side B
No.	Title	Length
5.	"All Moving Parts (Stand Still)"	5:07
6.	"Rock 'n' Roll Doctor"	3:30
7.	"She's Gone"	4:58
8.	"Dirty Women"	7:13
Total length:		40:35

=== 2021 Super Deluxe Edition ===
Disc one
No.	Title	Length

Disc two (New Mix)
No.	Title	Length
1.	"Back Street Kids"	3:49
2.	"You Won't Change Me"	6:33
3.	"It's Alright (Mono Single)"	4:00
4.	"Gypsy"	5:10
5.	"All Moving Parts (Stand Still)"	4:58
6.	"Rock 'n' Roll Doctor"	3:26
7.	"She's Gone"	4:55
8.	"Dirty Women"	7:42

Disc three (Outtakes & Alternative Mixes)
No.	Title	Length
1.	"Back Street Kids"	3:58
2.	"You Won't Change Me"	6:46
3.	"Gypsy"	5:16
4.	"All Moving Parts (Stand Still)"	5:32
5.	"Rock 'n' Roll Doctor"	3:34
6.	"She's Gone (Outtake Version)"	5:52
7.	"Dirty Women"	7:27
8.	"She's Gone (Instrumental Mix)"	4:05

Disc four (Live World Tour 1976-77)
No.	Title	Length
1.	"Symptom of the Universe"	4:49
2.	"War Pigs"	7:25
3.	"Gypsy"	5:13
4.	"Black Sabbath"	7:33
5.	"All Moving Parts (Stand Still)"	6:13
6.	"Dirty Women"	7:16
7.	"Drum Solo / Guitar Solo"	3:57
8.	"Electric Funeral"	3:27
9.	"Snowblind"	6:15
10.	"Children of the Grave"	4:46

==== Notes ====
- "It's Alright" and "She's Gone" were swapped on some copies, most notably the UK cassette version.
- Disc four of the 2021 Super Deluxe edition features a partial live recording of the band's performance on 8 December 1976 at the Civic Arena in Pittsburgh, Pennsylvania.

== Personnel ==
Personnel taken from Technical Ecstasy liner notes.

Black Sabbath

- Ozzy Osbourne – vocals (all except "It's Alright")
- Tony Iommi – guitars
- Geezer Butler – bass
- Bill Ward – drums, vocals on "It's Alright"

Additional musicians

- Gerald "Jezz" Woodroffe – keyboards and additional arrangements (credited as "Gerald Woodruffe")
- Mike Lewis – string arrangements and conducting on "She's Gone"

Technical personnel

- Black Sabbath – production, arrangements
- Robin Black – engineering
- Spock Wall – engineering assistance
- Tony Iommi – mastering
- Bob Hata – mastering
- Hipgnosis – sleeve design
- George Hardie – "robot" design
- Richard Manning – "robot" drawing

== Charts ==
Chart (1976)	Peak position
Canada Top Albums/CDs (RPM)	38
Swedish Albums (Sverigetopplistan)	33
UK Albums (Official Charts)	13
US Billboard 200	51

Chart (2021)	Peak position
Belgian Albums (Ultratop Wallonia)	123
German Albums (Offizielle Top 100)	27
Scottish Albums (Official Charts)	46
Swiss Albums (Schweizer Hitparade)	81
UK Independent Albums (Official Charts)	14
UK Rock & Metal Albums (Official Charts)	9

== Certifications ==
Region	Certification	Certified units/sales
United Kingdom (BPI)	Silver	60,000^{^}
United States (RIAA)	Gold	500,000^{^}
^{^} Shipments figures based on certification alone.

== Release history ==
Region	Date	Label
United States	1976	Warner Bros. Records
United Kingdom	October 1976	Vertigo Records
Canada	1976	Warner Bros. Records
United Kingdom	1996	Castle Communications
United Kingdom	2004	Sanctuary Records
