= Vol. 4 (Black Sabbath album) =

1972 studio album by Black Sabbath

Studio album by Black Sabbath
- Released: 22 September 1972
- Recorded: May–June 1972
- Studio: Record Plant (Los Angeles)
- Genres: Heavy metal; hard rock
- Length: 42:18
- Labels: Vertigo (Europe); Warner Bros. (US)
- Producers: Black Sabbath; Patrick Meehan

Black Sabbath chronology
| Master of Reality (1971) | Vol. 4 (1972) | Sabbath Bloody Sabbath (1973) |

Singles from Vol. 4
- 1. "Tomorrow's Dream" Released: 22 September 1972

Vol. 4 is the fourth studio album by the English heavy metal band Black Sabbath, released on 22 September 1972, by Vertigo Records. It was the first album by Black Sabbath not produced by Rodger Bain; guitarist Tony Iommi assumed production duties. Patrick Meehan, the band's then-manager, was listed as co-producer, though his actual involvement in the album's production was minimal.

The album continues the extremely heavy direction taken on the band's previous album, Master of Reality, while also featuring more experimental elements, such as on "Changes" and "FX".

Though it again failed to win the admiration of the music press, the album was again a major commercial success, peaking at No. 5 in the UK and No. 13 in the US, eventually being certified platinum in the latter. The album is today regarded as one of Sabbath's best albums, and has appeared on multiple lists of the greatest heavy metal albums.

== Background ==
In spite of the success of the band's previous three albums, Black Sabbath, Paranoid, and Master of Reality, the band had begun to struggle. These issues mainly arose due to the band's drug usage, which had accelerated during the recording of Master of Reality.

== Recording ==
Though the production of Vol. 4 is officially credited to Black Sabbath and Patrick Meehan, the bulk of the actual production was performed by guitarist Tony Iommi. "It's the first album we've produced ourselves," said vocalist Ozzy Osbourne in 1972. "Previously we had Rodger Bain as a producer – and, although he's very good, he didn't really feel what the band was doing. It was a matter of communication. This time, we did it with Patrick (Meehan), our manager, and I think we're all very happy… It was great to work in an American studio." Meehan had little actual involvement in the album's production but nonetheless insisted he be listed as producer, according to Iommi.

The recording was plagued with problems, many due to substance abuse. In the studio, the band regularly had speaker boxes full of cocaine delivered.

Struggling to record "Cornucopia" after "sitting in the middle of the room, just doing drugs", drummer Bill Ward feared that he was about to be fired: "I hated the song, there were some patterns that were just horrible. I nailed it in the end, but the reaction I got was the cold shoulder from everybody. It was like 'Well, just go home, you're not being of any use right now.' I felt like I'd blown it, I was about to get fired." According to the book How Black Was Our Sabbath, Ward "was always a drinker, but rarely appeared drunk. Retrospectively, that might have been a danger sign. Now, his self-control was clearly slipping." Iommi claims in his autobiography that Ward almost died after a prank-gone-wrong during recording. The Bel Air mansion the band was renting belonged to John du Pont and the band found several spray cans of gold DuPont paint in a room of the house; finding Ward naked and unconscious after drinking heavily, they proceeded to cover the drummer in gold paint from head to toe, blocking his pores and causing him to suffer a seizure.

In his autobiography I Am Ozzy, Osbourne speaks at length about the sessions: "In spite of all the arsing around, musically those few weeks in Bel Air were the strongest we'd ever been." But he admits, "Eventually we started to wonder where the fuck all the coke was coming from ... that coke was the whitest, purest, strongest stuff you could ever imagine. One sniff, and you were king of the universe." During a show in support of Vol. 4 at the Hollywood Bowl, the cocaine abuse caught up to Iommi. "Tony had been doing coke literally for days. We all had, but Tony had gone over the edge. He walked off the stage and collapsed," said Osbourne. During soundcheck earlier that same day, a crazed Christian man attempted to storm the stage and stab Iommi with a dagger, but he was tackled by members of the band's crew. According to Butler, "we wanted to take a break" at that point.

Osbourne also recounts the band's ongoing anxiety over the possibility of being busted, which worsened after they went to the cinema to see The French Connection (1971), about undercover New York City cops busting an international heroin-smuggling ring. "By the time the credits rolled," Osbourne recalled, "I was hyperventilating." In 2013, Butler admitted to Mojo magazine that heroin, too, had entered the picture: "We sniffed it, we never shot up ... I didn't realise how nuts things had gotten until I went home and the girl I was with didn't recognise me."

== Composition ==
Vol. 4 saw Black Sabbath expand beyond the heavy sound they had become known for. In June 2013 Mojo declared, "If booze and dope had helped fuel Sabbath's earlier albums, Vol. 4 is their cocaine ... Despite their spiraling addictions, musically Vol. 4 is another ambitious outing. The band's heavy side remains intact on the likes of 'Tomorrow's Dream', 'Cornucopia' and the seismic 'Supernaut' (a favourite of Frank Zappa, featuring Bill Ward's soul-inspired breakdown), but the guitar intro on 'St. Vitus Dance' possesses a jaunty, Led Zeppelin-flavoured quality, while 'Laguna Sunrise' is an evocative neo-classical Iommi instrumental." After being up all night and watching the sunrise at Laguna Beach, Iommi composed the song. In the studio, an orchestra accompanied Iommi's guitar, although they refused to perform until their parts were properly written out. The same orchestra performed on "Snowblind".

"Snowblind" is the band's most obvious reference to cocaine, their drug of choice during this period. Snowblind was also the album's working title, but Vertigo Records executives were reluctant to release an album with such an obvious drug reference. The liner notes thank "the great COKE-cola" and, in his autobiography, Osbourne notes, "Snowblind was one of Black Sabbath's best-ever albums – although the record company wouldn't let us keep the title, 'cos in those days cocaine was a big deal, and they didn't want the hassle of a controversy. We didn't argue."

Although most of the album is in the band's trademark heavy style, some songs demonstrate a more sensitive approach. "Changes", for example, written by Iommi with lyrics by Butler, is a piano ballad with Mellotron. Iommi taught himself to play the piano after finding one in the ballroom of the Bel-Air mansion they were renting. It was on this piano that "Changes" was composed. "Tony just sat down at the piano and came up with this beautiful riff," Osbourne writes in his memoir. "I hummed a melody over the top, and Geezer wrote these heartbreaking lyrics about the break-up Bill was going through with his wife. I thought that was brilliant from the moment we recorded it."

"FX" came about unexpectedly in the studio. After smoking hashish, the crucifix hanging from Iommi's neck accidentally struck the strings of his guitar and the band took an interest in the odd sound produced. An echo effect was added and the band proceeded to hit the guitar with various objects to generate odd sound effects. Iommi calls the song "a total joke".

Of "Wheels of Confusion", Henry Rollins said: "It's about alienation and being lost in the wheels of confusion, which is the way I find myself a lot of the time. Sabbath could be my favourite band. It's the ultimate lonely man's rock. There's something about their music that's so painful and yet so powerful."

The album, Tony Iommi told Circus's sister magazine Circus Raves, "was such a complete change – we felt we had jumped an album, really ... We had tried to go too far."

== Artwork ==
Sleeve Photo

The album was originally to be titled Snowblind in reference to both the song "Snowblind" and the amount of cocaine they took while recording. However, according to Geezer, the record label thought this was too edgy and retitled the album Vol. 4 and changed the artwork while the band was on vacation. Vol. 4's final cover features a monochrome photograph of Ozzy Osbourne with hands raised and two fingers extended, taken during a Black Sabbath concert at Birmingham Town Hall in January 1972 by Keith McMillan (credited as Keef). The album's original release (on Vertigo in the UK, on Warner Bros. in the United States and on Nippon Phonogram in Japan) features a gatefold sleeve with a page glued into the middle. Each band member is given his own photo page, with the band on-stage at the very centre. All photos were from the aforementioned Birmingham gig.

The album's original cover art has proved iconic, and has been imitated and parodied on numerous occasions, such as on the 1992 Peaceville Volume 4 compilation album, the 1992 Volume Two EP by the band Sleep, Longmont Potion Castle Vol. 4 by the prank caller Longmont Potion Castle, and the 1994 Planet Caravan EP by Pantera.

The U.S. 8-track tape and cassette releases of the album feature alternate artwork: a yellow background with Ozzy silhouetted in black.

== Release and reception ==
Professional ratings
Aggregate scores
| Source | Rating |
|---|---|
| Metacritic | 96/100 (super deluxe) |
Review scores
| Source | Rating |
| AllMusic | 5/5 stars |
| Classic Rock | 3.5/5 stars |
| Encyclopedia of Popular Music | 4/5 stars |
| The Great Rock Discography | 8/10 |
| Pitchfork | 9.0/10 |
| The Rolling Stone Album Guide | 3/5 stars |
| Rolling Stone | favourable |
| Spin Alternative Record Guide | 8/10 |
| Sputnikmusic | 1.5/5 |

Vol. 4 was released in September 1972, and while most critics of the era were dismissive of the album, it achieved gold status in less than a month, and was the band's fourth consecutive release to sell one million copies in the United States. It reached number 13 on Billboard's pop album chart and number 8 on the UK Albums Chart. The song "Tomorrow's Dream" was released as a single but failed to chart. Following an extensive tour of the United States, the band toured Australia for the second time in 1973, and later Europe.

Rock critic Lester Bangs, who had derided the band's earlier albums, applauded Vol. 4, writing in Creem, "We have seen the Stooges take on the night ferociously and go tumbling into the maw, and Alice Cooper is currently exploiting it for all it's worth, turning it into a circus. But there's only one band that's dealt with it honestly on terms meaningful to vast portions of the audience, not only grappling with it in a mythic structure that's both personal and powerful but actually managing to prosper as well. And that band is Black Sabbath." Bangs also compared the band's lyrics to those of Bob Dylan and William S. Burroughs.

In a retrospective overview of the band’s releases throughout their career,The Guardian comments that “Vol 4 is..blank and unrelenting...“Wheels of Confusion” reduces the idea of the riff to its bare minimum. “Snowblind” – originally intended to be the title track – captures the essence of Vol 4. All your nihilist needs met in one place.”

== Legacy ==
In June 2000, Q placed Vol. 4 at number 60 in its list of The 100 Greatest British Albums Ever and described the album as "the sound of drug-taking, beer-guzzling hooligans from Britain's oft-pilloried cultural armpit let loose in LA." In his 2013 biography on the band Black Sabbath: Symptom of the Universe, Mick Wall insists "Under the Sun" would become the "sonic signpost" for bands that would follow Sabbath in years to come, such as Iron Maiden and Metallica. Frank Zappa identified "Supernaut" as one of his all-time favorites. (In a 1994 interview with Guitar for the Practicing Musician, Butler revealed, "I loved Zappa's lyric approach. That influenced me lyrically, definitely.") "Supernaut" was also one of Led Zeppelin drummer John Bonham's favourite songs. Spin named Vol. 4 the 14th greatest metal album of all time in 2002, deeming it "the first (and perhaps last) truly industrial metal album."

Kerrang! magazine listed the album at No. 48 among the "100 Greatest Heavy Metal Albums of All Time". Rolling Stone ranked it 14th on their 2017 list of "100 Greatest Metal Albums of All Time". The album was also included in the book 1001 Albums You Must Hear Before You Die. In 1991, Chuck Eddy ranked Vol. 4 at number 139 in his list of the 500 best heavy metal albums. Noting that some early fans 'jumped ship' with Vol. 4, Eddy says that other fans regard it as Black Sabbath's best album, which he credits to the album's 'jazz', highlighting parts of "Cornucopia" and a section near the end of "Wheels of Confusion" for boasting a captivating "trancy mesh of thump" in the beat, also adding that "Supernaut" is an "astonishing funk-frug" that is comparable to Miles Davis' "Black Satin" (1972). "FX", an electronic experiment, has been cited by Eddy as "pre-dub dub-metal" for its psychedelic-style delay, with "protodub echoes".

== Track listing ==
All lyrics are written by Geezer Butler; all music is composed by Black Sabbath (Geezer Butler, Tony Iommi, Ozzy Osbourne and Bill Ward).

Side A
| No. | Title | Length |
|---|---|---|
| 1. | "Wheels of Confusion" | 8:02 |
| 2. | "Tomorrow's Dream" | 3:12 |
| 3. | "Changes" | 4:44 |
| 4. | "FX" (instrumental) | 1:44 |
| 5. | "Supernaut" | 4:50 |

Side B
| No. | Title | Length |
|---|---|---|
| 6. | "Snowblind" | 5:33 |
| 7. | "Cornucopia" | 3:55^{[A]} |
| 8. | "Laguna Sunrise" (instrumental) | 2:53 |
| 9. | "St. Vitus Dance" | 2:30 |
| 10. | "Under the Sun" | 5:53 |
| Total length: | | 42:18 |

=== 2021 Super Deluxe Edition ===
Disc one
| No. | Title | Length |

Disc two (Outtakes, New Mixes)
| No. | Title | Length |
|---|---|---|
| 1. | "Wheels of Confusion" | 8:14 |
| 2. | "Changes" | 3:06 |
| 3. | "Supernaut" | 4:11 |
| 4. | "Snowblind" | 5:02 |
| 5. | "Laguna Sunrise" | 2:31 |
| 6. | "Under the Sun" (instrumental) | 3:44 |
| Total length: | | 24:26 |

Disc three (Alternative Takes, False Starts & Studio Dialogue)
| No. | Title | Length |
|---|---|---|
| 1. | "Wheels of Confusion" (False Start with Studio Dialogue) | 0:26 |
| 2. | "Wheels of Confusion" (Alternative Take 1) | 4:03 |
| 3. | "Wheels of Confusion" (Alternative Take 2) | 5:20 |
| 4. | "Wheels of Confusion" (Alternative Take 3) | 5:24 |
| 5. | "Wheels of Confusion" (Alternative Take 4) | 5:30 |
| 6. | "The Straightener" (Outtake) | 3:18 |
| 7. | "Supernaut" (Outtake) | 5:10 |
| 8. | "Supernaut" (Alternative Takes with False Starts) | 13:26 |
| 9. | "Snowblind" (Alternative Take 1 - Incomplete) | 3:30 |
| 10. | "Under the Sun" (False Start with Studio Dialogue) | 2:00 |
| 11. | "Under the Sun" (Alternative Take with Guide Vocal) | 3:44 |
| Total length: | | 51:53 |

Disc four (Live in the UK 1973)
| No. | Title | Length |
|---|---|---|
| 1. | "Tomorrow's Dream" | 3:21 |
| 2. | "Sweet Leaf" | 5:31 |
| 3. | "War Pigs" | 7:52 |
| 4. | "Snowblind" | 5:17 |
| 5. | "Killing Yourself to Live" | 5:45 |
| 6. | "Cornucopia" | 4:55 |
| 7. | "Wicked World / Guitar Solo / Orchid / Into the Void / Sometimes I'm Happy" | 19:57 |
| 8. | "Supernaut / Drum Solo" | 3:57 |
| 9. | "Wicked World" (Reprise) | 2:17 |
| 10. | "Embryo" | 0:23 |
| 11. | "Children of the Grave" | 5:37 |
| 12. | "Paranoid" | 4:11 |
| Total length: | | 69:04 |

Notes

- Discs two and three of the 2021 Super Deluxe edition feature alternate versions from the May 1972 recording sessions that have been mixed in 2020 by Steven Wilson.
- Disc four of the 2021 Super Deluxe edition features live recordings from two performances from 1973 that have been mixed in 2020 by Richard Digby-Smith. Tracks 1–4 and 7–12 were recorded on 16 March 1973 at the Rainbow Theatre in London, England, and tracks 5–6 were recorded on 11 March 1973 at the Hardrock Concert Theatre in Manchester, England. Tracks 3 and 5–12 were previously released on the 1980 live album Live at Last, while tracks 1, 2 and 4 were previously unreleased. The March 11 and 16 concerts were originally recorded for use in a planned live album release, but the project was ultimately scrapped despite its plans being already promoted in UK newspaper articles. The master tapes of the March 11 and 16 recordings were taken out and remastered for accurately compiling a complete 1973 concert setlist for the 2021 Volume 4 Super Deluxe release.
- Some North American pressings have parts of the songs titled as "The Straightener" and "Every Day Comes and Goes"; the former is the coda of "Wheels of Confusion", while the latter is a two-minute segment that serves as the bridge for "Under the Sun". These parts are not titled on original releases or any European release except the European release of the 2021 Volume 4 Super Deluxe edition.

== Personnel ==
Black Sabbath

- Ozzy Osbourne – vocals
- Tony Iommi – guitars, piano, Mellotron, sound effects on "FX"
- Geezer Butler – bass, Mellotron
- Bill Ward – drums, percussion

Additional

- Colin Caldwell, Vic Smith – engineering
- Patrick Meehan – production

== Charts ==
| Chart (1972) | Peak position |
|---|---|
| Australian Albums (Kent Music Report) | 1 |
| Canada Top Albums/CDs (RPM) | 5 |
| Finnish Albums (The Official Finnish Charts) | 2 |
| German Albums (Offizielle Top 100) | 8 |
| Italian Albums (Musica e Dischi) | 18 |
| Japanese Albums (Oricon) | 46 |
| Norwegian Albums (VG-lista) | 7 |
| UK Albums (Official Charts) | 5 |
| US Billboard 200 | 13 |

| Chart (2021) | Peak position |
|---|---|
| Austrian Albums (Ö3 Austria) | 58 |
| Belgian Albums (Ultratop Wallonia) | 142 |
| Scottish Albums (Official Charts) | 32 |
| Swedish Hard Rock Albums (Sverigetopplistan) | 1 |
| Swedish Physical Albums (Sverigetopplistan) | 3 |
| Swedish Vinyl Albums (Sverigetopplistan) | 2 |
| Swiss Albums (Schweizer Hitparade) | 17 |
| UK Independent Albums (Official Charts) | 12 |
| UK Rock & Metal Albums (Official Charts) | 4 |

| Chart (2025) | Peak position |
|---|---|
| Greek Albums (IFPI) | 94 |

== Certifications ==
| Region | Certification | Certified units/sales |
|---|---|---|
| Canada (Music Canada) | Platinum | 100,000^{^} |
| United Kingdom (BPI) | Gold | 100,000^{‡} |
| United States (RIAA) | Platinum | 1,000,000^{^} |
^{^} Shipments figures based on certification alone.^{‡} Sales+streaming figures based on certification alone.

== Notes ==
- A Original North American Warner Bros. Records pressings of Vol. 4 (catalog no. BS 2602) incorrectly list "Cornucopia"'s running time as 4:52.

== Bibliography ==
- Rosen, Steven (1996). The Story of Black Sabbath: Wheels of Confusion. Castle Communications. ISBN 1-86074-149-5.
- Chow, Jason (2006). Dimery, Robert (ed.). 1001 Albums You Must Hear Before You Die. Quintet Publishing Limited. ISBN 0-7893-1371-5.
