= Patrick Meehan (producer) =

British record producer

Patrick Anthony Meehan (born 29 June 1948) is a British record producer, who is best known to have worked with English heavy metal band Black Sabbath until he was fired in 1975 by the band.

Meehan founded Worldwide Artiste Management at No. 4 Leicester Street, London, in 1970 along with his father (also called Patrick), Wilf Pine and Malcolm Koss. Meehan Sr was a former stuntman who had roadied for Gene Vincent and worked with Small Faces manager Don Arden. As well as Black Sabbath, the group managed the progressive rock band Gentle Giant (remnants of 1960s pop band Simon Dupree and the Big Sound), Snafu (featuring original Procol Harum drummer Bobby Harrison), Black Widow, the Dutch band Cobra, Catapilla, Redbone and Mama Lion.

The company was listed on the London Stock Exchange in late 1970 after Black Sabbath became commercially successful. In 1971, Worldwide Artiste Management merged with Hemdale Ltd (named after founders, actors David Hemmings and John Daley) and moved to Mayfair. In 1973 Meehan launched the World Wide Artists (WWA) record label, which released albums by Black Sabbath, Gentle Giant, Snafu and The Groundhogs, with distribution by Phonogram. After 36 releases, the company closed in 1975.

Meehan fell out with Black Sabbath in the late 1970s after the band realized they were paid $250,000 for their Cal Jam performance, yet received only $1000 each. This led the band to discover that all of their property, including their houses and cars, was owned by Meehan, they literally owned nothing and had been swindled. He acquired HandMade Films in the late 1990s, becoming its executive chairman.
