= Never Say Die! =

- Cover design by Hipgnosis

Studio album by Black Sabbath
- Released: 29 September 1978
- Recorded: 1978
- Studio: Sounds Interchange (Toronto)
- Genres: Heavy metal; hard rock; pop rock
- Length: 45:41
- Label: Vertigo
- Producer: Black Sabbath

Black Sabbath chronology
Technical Ecstasy (1976)	Never Say Die! (1978)	Heaven and Hell (1980)

Singles from Never Say Die!
- 1. "Never Say Die!" Released: 19 May 1978; 2. "Hard Road" Released: 29 September 1978

Never Say Die! is the eighth studio album by the English heavy metal band Black Sabbath, released on 29 September 1978. It was the last studio album with the band's original line-up and the last studio album to feature original vocalist Ozzy Osbourne until the 2013 album 13. It was certified Gold in the U.S. on 7 November 1997 and as of November 2011 has sold 133,000 copies in the United States since the SoundScan era. The album received mixed reviews, with critics calling it "unbalanced" and insisting its energy was scattered in too many directions.

== Recording ==
At the time of recording Never Say Die!, Black Sabbath's members were struggling with heavy substance abuse. Before sessions began, vocalist Ozzy Osbourne temporarily left the band and was briefly replaced by Dave Walker, known for his work with Savoy Brown and Fleetwood Mac. According to guitarist Tony Iommi, although both parties likely wanted to reunite, no one communicated directly, leading to Walker's short-lived stint. The band even performed early material with him, including an early version of “Junior’s Eyes” on the BBC show Look Hear.

Osbourne eventually returned, but refused to sing any of the material written during Walker’s tenure. One of those songs, “Swinging the Chain,” was sung by drummer Bill Ward instead. Because the band was often writing songs during the day and recording them at night, they had little time for revisions, resulting in an album Iommi later described as lacking cohesion.

Osbourne also declined to contribute vocals to “Breakout,” which remained instrumental. The lyrics to “Junior’s Eyes” were revised to reflect the recent passing of Osbourne’s father.

Personal issues further delayed the album’s production. Osbourne later explained that his father’s death led to a three-month hiatus for mourning and funeral arrangements. Although the band eventually regrouped in the studio, tensions lingered—especially between Osbourne and Iommi—and the sense of unity had faded.

The album was recorded at Sounds Interchange Studios in Toronto. Iommi recalled that the band chose the studio largely for tax reasons, but it proved ill-suited for their needs. To improve the studio’s acoustics, they had to remove carpeting to create a more vibrant sound, which delayed progress due to the lack of better alternatives.

In a 2001 interview, Iommi recalled that the band rehearsed in a freezing cinema during the harsh Toronto winter and recorded sessions at night, adding further discomfort to an already strained process. Bassist Geezer Butler characterized the album as a patchwork effort. He noted that despite the album's defiant title, the band sensed it might be their final collaboration. During their 10th anniversary tour with Van Halen, Butler recalled feeling doubtful about the band's future despite public optimism.

Butler also expressed frustration over Osbourne’s frequent rejection of his lyrics, revealing that last-minute rewrites became common late in their partnership. Iommi, in a 2004 retrospective, described a chaotic studio environment where the band was often too intoxicated to work effectively, with members contributing inconsistently and lacking focus.

Osbourne, in a later interview, described the band as overwhelmed and dysfunctional, plagued by addiction and interpersonal conflict. He was ultimately dismissed from the group, describing the atmosphere as toxic and unsalvageable.

Despite these challenges, Ward defended the album years later, suggesting the band did their best under the circumstances and even experimented creatively, particularly on tracks like “Johnny Blade” and “Air Dance.” Osbourne, however, criticized these jazz-influenced tracks in his memoir, particularly “Breakout,” which he found artistically incompatible with the band’s identity.

Although Ward performed vocals on “Swinging the Chain,” the lyrics were mistakenly credited to Butler when they were actually written by Ward himself.

== Artwork ==
The album’s sleeve was designed by Storm Thorgerson’s Hipgnosis, their second collaboration with the band following Technical Ecstasy (1976). The UK and US versions featured slight differences in background imagery, including faint silhouettes of British military pilots. The album’s inner sleeve featured consistent artwork and credits but omitted lyrics. The cover aircraft resembles a North American T-6 Texan. An alternate design featuring masked doctors was rejected by the band but later used by Rainbow for their 1981 album Difficult to Cure.

== Release and critical reception ==
Professional ratings
Review scores
Source	Rating
AllMusic	1.5/5 stars
Classic Rock	3.5/5 stars
Encyclopedia of Popular Music	3/5 stars
The Great Rock Discography	5/10
The Rolling Stone Album Guide	3/5 stars
Spin Alternative Record Guide	7/10

In the UK the title track, released well ahead of the album as the band's first UK picture sleeve single, reached No. 21 in the chart and gave the band its first Top of the Pops appearances since 1970. In the UK the album reached No. 12, one place higher than its predecessor Technical Ecstasy. In the US it peaked at number 69 on the Billboard Pop Album chart. In the UK, "Hard Road" was released as the second single from the album and reached the UK Top 40, 25,000 copies being pressed in a limited-edition purple-vinyl. There was no picture-sleeve release but a video for "A Hard Road" was made during the Never Say Die! Tour to promote the single. The song marks the first and last time guitarist Tony Iommi sings backing vocals. Iommi explains in his autobiography Iron Man: My Journey Through Heaven & Hell with Black Sabbath, that when he sang, bassist Geezer Butler couldn't keep a straight face.

The album received mostly negative reviews; according to Terry Staunton of Uncut, "even diehard fans among the music press [were] unsure of muddling excursions towards electronica ('Johnny Blade') and passages that veered worryingly close to jazz ('Air Dance', the curious horns in the instrumental 'Breakout'). More than one critic described the overall sound as 'murky'." It is not held in high esteem today, with AllMusic critic Eduardo Rivadavia referring to the album as "unfocused", saying it "will hold little interest to the average heavy metal fan". Rolling Stone says it was "not a blaze of glory for the original foursome" but added that it may be "better than people might remember". In his own Uncut piece, Staunton bemoaned the experiments, but believed that the "few occasions where the stars align and ducks form an orderly row" are "worth celebrating", singling out the title track for its power and "Junior's Eyes" for having a vitality and tension missing elsewhere. Rob Michaels of the Spin Alternative Record Guide (1995) writes that "the rhythm section has a spry spring in its leaden step and the songs are tough and catchy." In 2013 Phil Alexander of Mojo referred to the album as "disastrous".

Speaking in October 1978 of the new album, Osbourne said, "It's a combination of what we've all been through in the last 10 years. It's a very varied album. Like, we started out playing in blues clubs, because British blues – like John Mayall and early Fleetwood Mac – was the thing at the time. We were into a twelve-bar trip and early Ten Years After-style stuff. So it's part of that sort of trip. Then there's the heavy thing and the rock thing. It's not just steamhammer headbanging stuff all the way through ... We got rid of all our inner frustrations: what each of us individually wanted to put down over the years but couldn't because of the pressures of work. So we put a lot of painstaking hours into developing this album." However, Osbourne quickly soured on the LP, telling After Hours in a 1981 interview "The last album I did with Sabbath was Never Say Die! and it was the worst piece of work that I've ever had anything to do with. I'm ashamed of that album. I think it's disgusting". He went on to claim that the band flew to Toronto in January during sub-zero temperature "purely because the Rolling Stones had recorded a live album there." In 2013, Osbourne told Mojo, "I'd go down to the studio and I heard what sounded like a jazz band playing. Is this really Black Sabbath? I'd just fuck off." Osbourne was fired by the band eight months later.

Wil Malone, who oversaw the jazz-inflected horns arrangements on the album, is a British music producer and arranger, who, besides working with Black Sabbath, went on to work with Iron Maiden, Todd Rundgren, The Verve, Massive Attack, and Depeche Mode.

Jon Elstar, who was recruited to play harmonica on "Swinging the Chain," had also played on releases by R & B proto-punk band The Pretty Things, as well as appearing on reggae releases on Trojan Records label.

Despite the negative reception, Soundgarden guitarist Kim Thayil cited Never Say Die! as one of his favourite Black Sabbath albums. Megadeth covered the title track for the 2000 tribute album Nativity In Black II, with singer Dave Mustaine telling Nick Bowcott in 2008, "The simplicity of Iommi's style makes this rhythm progression one of my all-time favorites: fast, classic English riff-stylings with a climactic arrangement." Andy LaRocque, guitarist for King Diamond, was influenced by the album in the making of the melodic guitar part of "Sleepless Nights", from the Conspiracy album.

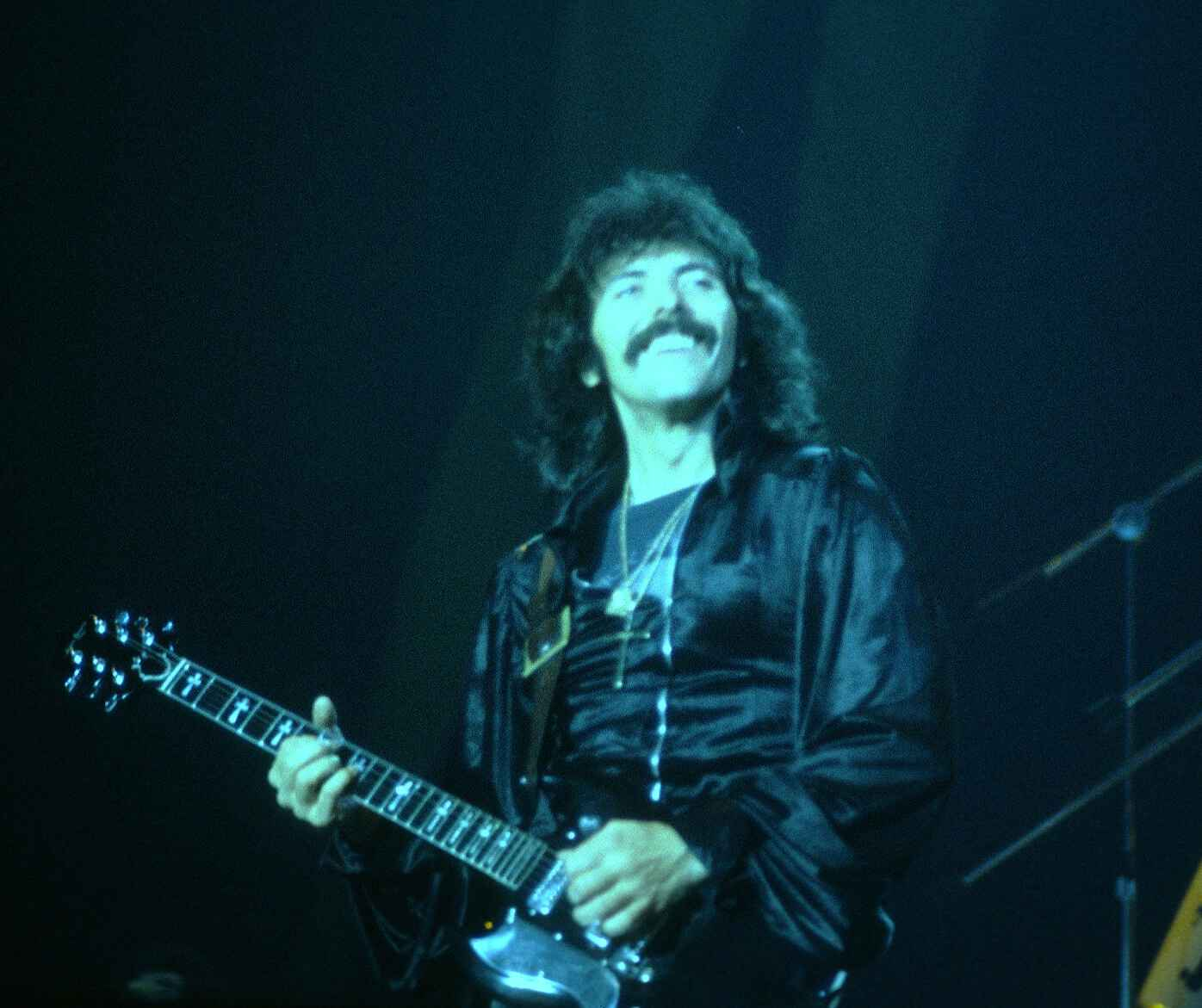
Tony Iommi in 1978.

In March 2017, Jon Hadusek of Consequence of Sound ranked Never Say Die! 10th out of 19 Black Sabbath studio albums. He called it "straight-up pop rock, primed for heavy rotation", but felt it had merits, complimenting Osbourne's confident vocals and Iommi's guitar for "[not being] buried like it was on Technical Ecstasy, and the rigid melodies force his playing to be concise and punchy." Among other similar lists, Kerrang! ranked it 15th, praising the choice of a punky opening track but panning the inclusion of a Ward-song sung and noting a lack of creative enthusiasm throughout. Ultimate Classic Rock ranked it 12th, praising the energetic title track, "Johnny Blade" and "A Hard Road", but believing they and the abundance of weaker songs "paled next to the colossal metal anthems recorded just a few years earlier". Classic Rock ranked it 10th, believing both it and Technical Ecstasy to be the band's most underrated albums. Also ranking it 10th, The Guardian comments that the album "has a terrible reputation, but it's a quirky and enjoyable record, as long as you don't expect Sabbath Even Bloodier Sabbath. The title track has garage-band rawness; Air Dance is – dare one say it – oddly beautiful. It’s hit and miss, but it’s still better than almost everything from 1981 onwards."

Geezer Butler told Metal Edge that Never Say Die! is easily the worst album that the band made. He explained, "The reason for that is we tried to manage ourselves and produce the record ourselves. We wanted to do it on our own, but in truth, not one of us had a single clue about what to do. By that point, we were spending more time with lawyers and in court rather than being in the studio writing. It was just too much pressure on us, and the writing suffered."

== Never Say Die! Tour with Van Halen ==
Black Sabbath's Never Say Die! Tour opened on 16 May 1978 in Sheffield with Van Halen as their opening act, who'd just scored a hit in the United States with a cover of The Kinks' "You Really Got Me." Ward's drum tech Graham Wright and Osbourne's personal assistant David Tangye, who write extensively about the tour in their 2004 book How Black Was Our Sabbath, reveal that relations between the bands got off to a shaky start at the 22 May show at the Apollo Theatre in Manchester. After Sabbath finished their soundcheck, Van Halen "hit the stage and started to play Sabbath tunes. It was their way of paying tribute to the Sabs, but Tony Iommi was annoyed by it. He may have misinterpreted the gesture as a piss-take, which it certainly was not. Van Halen were in awe of Sabbath, and their lead guitarist, Eddie Van Halen, was a big fan of Tony. The unwitting faux pas was soon forgotten. The two bands came to get along very well together, and Alex Van Halen would often sit ... behind Bill's drum kit, watching and listening to him play onstage." On the U.S. leg of the tour, Van Halen's presence had a major influence on ticket sales since they were a much bigger draw at home than they were in the UK. Wright and Graham also recount two riots that occurred on the Never Say Die! tour, the first happening in Neunkirchen am Brand, Germany, in front of a hall crammed with "thousands of extremely stoned, drunk and rowdy GIs" when, three songs into a show, Iommi stalked off the stage because of a buzzing from his guitar stack. When the audience realised the band had quit the gig they wrecked the hall. Another riot ensued at the Municipal Auditorium in Nashville when Osbourne didn't show up and the band had to cancel; it later came to light that Osbourne had "slept right round the clock, woken up, seen that it was six o'clock, and thinking that it was still the evening before, had got ready for the show. Even more incredibly, he'd been sleeping in the wrong room." A video from this period, professionally recorded on the UK tour at the Hammersmith Odeon in June 1978, can be seen on the Sanctuary Visual Entertainment DVD, also entitled Never Say Die.

Several US dates featured the Ramones as an opener, either in addition to, or in lieu of Van Halen. The NYC punk rock band was eager to expand their fanbase, and considered themselves to have more in common with the hard rock bands of 1978 than with a band like the Sex Pistols. In part due to one promoter billing the event as “punk vs. metal”, Sabbath's audience responded to the opener with open hostility.

== Top of the Pops appearance ==
With the success of the "Never Say Die" single, Black Sabbath was invited to perform on Top of the Pops. The band twice appeared live in the studio, miming to a pre-recorded version of the song. One of these appearances was included on the official The Black Sabbath Story, Vol. 1 video release. In his autobiography, Osbourne remembers the appearance fondly "'cos we got to meet Bob Marley. I'll always remember the moment he came out of his dressing room – it was next to ours – and you literally couldn't see his head through the cloud of dope smoke. He was smoking the biggest, fattest joint I'd ever seen – and believe me, I'd seen a few. I kept thinking, He's gonna have to lip-synch, no one can do a live show when they're that high. But no – he did it live. Flawlessly, too." In his autobiography, Iommi reveals that because drummer Bill Ward had his hair in braids at the time, "everybody thought he was taking the mickey out of Bob (Marley). It wasn't like that at all; it was just the way he happened to have his hair in those days."

== Track listing ==
All tracks are written by Black Sabbath (Geezer Butler, Tony Iommi, Ozzy Osbourne, and Bill Ward).

Side A
No.	Title	Length
1.	"Never Say Die"	3:50
2.	"Johnny Blade"	6:28
3.	"Junior's Eyes"	6:42
4.	"A Hard Road" ( (Note: Track 4 is titled "Hard Road" on the releases by Vertigo (the UK and Europe) and "A Hard Road" on releases by Warner (United States and Canada).))	6:04

Side B
No.	Title	Length
5.	"Shock Wave"	5:15
6.	"Air Dance"	5:17
7.	"Over to You"	5:22
8.	"Breakout" (instrumental)	2:35
9.	"Swinging the Chain"	4:06
Total length:		45:41

== Personnel ==
Black Sabbath

- Tony Iommi – guitars, backing vocals on "A Hard Road"
- Ozzy Osbourne – lead and backing vocals
- Geezer Butler – bass guitar, backing vocals on "A Hard Road"
- Bill Ward – drums, lead vocals on "Swinging the Chain", backing vocals on "A Hard Road"

Additional musicians

- Don Airey – keyboards
- Jon Elstar – harmonica
- Wil Malone – brass arrangements

Technical personnel

- Black Sabbath – production
- Dave Harris – engineering
- Spock Wall – special assistance
- Hipgnosis – sleeve design

== Charts ==
Chart (1978)	Peak position
Canada Top Albums/CDs (RPM)	90
French Albums (SNEP)	33
Swedish Albums (Sverigetopplistan)	37
UK Albums (Official Charts)	12
US Billboard 200	69

Chart (2023)	Peak position
Scottish Albums (Official Charts)	84
UK Independent Albums (Official Charts)	20
UK Rock & Metal Albums (Official Charts)	9

== Certifications ==
Region	Certification	Certified units/sales
United States (RIAA)	Gold	500,000^{^}
^{^} Shipments figures based on certification alone.
