= List of cover versions of Black Sabbath songs =

This is a list of notable Black Sabbath covers or samples by various artists. It does not include bootleg or unrecorded live performances, or any unreleased demo recordings.

== A National Acrobat ==
Second track on album Sabbath Bloody Sabbath (1973).

- The heavy metal band Metallica covered this song and "Sabbra Cadabra" on their Garage Inc. cover album in one condensed song entitled "Sabbra Cadabra".
- Swedish stoner/doom metal band DoomDogs covered "A National Acrobat" on their album "Unleash the Truth".
- Czech singer Jiří Schelinger covered "A National Acrobat" as a member of "František Ringo Čech" band. The song appeared on their debut album "Nemám hlas jako zvon" (My voice does not ring the bell) in 1974 under a name "Metro, dobrý den" (Hello, underground).
- American psychedelic rock band ACIDTHRONE covered "A National Acrobat" as their 12th song in their 2021 album "The Philosopher's Stoned".

== After Forever ==
Second track on their album Master of Reality (1971).

- "After Forever" has been covered by Biohazard for Nativity in Black, a Black Sabbath tribute album.
- Aurora Borealis for Hell Rules: Tribute to Black Sabbath, Vol. 2.
- Deliverance on their 1992 album What a Joke.
- Frost Like Ashes on their debut EP Pure As the Blood Covered Snow.
- Shelter on their 1992 album Quest for Certainty.
- Stryper on their 2015 album Fallen.
- Troglodyte Dawn with rewritten lyrics and titled "Forever After" on their 2003 debut album Troglodyte Dawn.
- Finnish Black Sabbath tribute band Sapattivuosi covered this song on their album Sapattivuosi Vol. 2 in Finnish as 'Ikuisuuden jälkeen'.

== Behind the Wall of Sleep ==
Third track on their album Black Sabbath (1970).

- Jazz Sabbath in 2022 on their album Vol.2.
- Static-X covered this on their album Beneath... Between... Beyond....
- Macabre covered this on their EP Behind the Wall of Sleep.

== Black Sabbath ==
First track on their album Black Sabbath (1970).

- Jazz Sabbath in 2022 on their album Vol.2.
- Amber Asylum in 2000, on their album The Supernatural Parlour Collection.
- Flower Travellin' Band in 1970, on their album Anywhere.
- For Record Store Day 2014 Gonga released a 12" single "Black Sabbeth" (sic) containing a cover of "Black Sabbath" featuring guest vocals by Beth Gibbons of Portishead.
- Halo on their album Massive Corporate Disease
- Iced Earth in 2002, on their album Tribute to the Gods.
- LA Guns in 1996, on their album American Hardcore (bonus track on Japan release).
- Rotting Christ, on the tribute album "Sabbath Cadabra: A Greek Tribute to Black Sabbath".
- The Throwaways in 1993, on their album Postmadonna Primadonna.
- Type O Negative in 1994, for the Black Sabbath tribute album Nativity in Black.
- Vader in 1994, on their EP Sothis, later included on their album Future of the Past.
- Van Helsing's Curse in 2004, on their album Oculus Infernum.
- The main riff of the song has been sampled by Ice-T in his song "Shut up! Be happy!" (featuring Jello Biafra) on the album The Iceberg/Freedom of Speech... Just Watch What You Say!.
- The main riff of the song has also been sampled by Ice-T in his song "Midnight" on the album O.G. Original Gangster.
- Magoo on a 1998 split single with Mogwai on Fierce Panda Records.
- Venetian Snares released this song and "Electric Funeral" in 2007 as a dub remix 12" under the name Snares.
- Brownout released this song on their 2014 "Brown Sabbath" LP on Ubiquity Records.
- Nürnberg (Post-Punk band from Minsk, Belarus) in 2025, on "The Black Album" by Cleopatra Records.

== Changes ==
Third track on their album Black Sabbath Vol. 4 (1972).

- Country musician Billy Walker recorded a version of the song on his 1973 album The Hand of Love.
- Sampled by rapper Eminem on the song "Going Through Changes" for his Recovery album.
- A new version with altered lyrics appeared on Prince of Darkness with Kelly Osbourne and Ozzy singing a duet version.
- Hell Is for Heroes covered this song as a B-side to their single "Night Vision".
- Fudge Tunnel covered this song on Earache's Masters of Misery compilation.
- Overkill covered the song on their 1999 cover album Coverkill.
- Japanese melodic punk band Hi-Standard covered this song on their Making the Road album.
- In 2013, soul singer Charles Bradley released a single with his version of the song.
- UK based Heavy/Doom Metal band Raven Black Night covered this song on their 2013's album Barbarian Winter.
- Jazz Sabbath released an instrumental jazz rendition of this song on their self-titled debut album.
- Yungblud released a live rendition recorded during the Back to the Beginning performance on July 11, 2025.

== Children of the Grave ==
Fourth track on their album Master of Reality (1971).

- Canadian rockers Jet Set Satellite covered the song on their 2008 album End of an Era.
- American band Racer X released a cover of the song that can be heard on the Japanese version of Technical Difficulties.
- The song has been covered by German heavy metal band Grave Digger.
- Also, hardcore punk band The Fartz covered it for their Because This Fuckin' World Still Stinks album.
- It has also been covered by the Finnish band Tarot on To Live Forever.
- The American straight edge hardcore band Earth Crisis covered the song for their covers album "Last Of The Sane."
- The Swedish stoner metal band Hellfueled covered this song on their 2002 demo album "The Red One."
- The band White Zombie covered "Children of the Grave" for the Black Sabbath tribute album Nativity in Black. It was later released as a promo single in 1994.
- Melodic death metal band from Sweden Amon Amarth on their compilation album Hymns to the Rising Sun.
- American death metal band Master on their 1990 self-titled debut album.
- Cancer Bats covered Children of the Grave on their EP "Bat Sabbath Bastard of Reality".
- American thrash metal band Havok on their 2013 album Unnatural Selection.
- Peruvian black metal band Two Face Sinner covered the song on their EP "Buried Alive in Black".
- Italian doom metal band Firelord covered the song on their 2013 album "Among the Snakes".
- Neurosis in 1999, on a split EP with Soilent Green that is Volume 6 of the In These Black Days tribute series.
- American alternative metal band Stone Sour covered this song on their 2015 EP "Meanwhile in Burbank..."
- Finnish Black Sabbath tribute band Sapattivuosi covered this song on their debut album in Finnish as 'Hautuumaan lapset'.
- Jazz Sabbath released an instrumental jazz rendition of this song on their self-titled debut album.
- Brownout released this song on their 2016 "Brown Sabbath, Vol. 2" LP on Ubiquity Records.

== Children of the Sea ==
Second track on the album Heaven and Hell (1980).

- Jag Panzer covered the song on the album Holy Dio: A Tribute to the Voice of Metal.
- Silver Fist covered this song on their album Ave Fenix.
- Finnish Black Sabbath tribute band Sapattivuosi covered this song on their album Ihmisen Merkki in Finnish as "Uneen Hukkuneet".

== Cornucopia ==
Seventh track on their album Black Sabbath Vol.4 (1972).

- In 1999, the thrash metal band Overkill covered the song for their cover album Coverkill.
- British sludge metal band Iron Monkey covered it on their album Ruined By Idiots.
- Rochester, NY-based grindcore band Brutal Truth covered it on In These Black Days: Vol. 2.
- Brazilian thrash metal band Sepultura covered it on their live album Under a Pale Grey Sky.

== Die Young ==
Sixth track on the album Heaven and Hell (1980).

- Fates Warning covered the song on their album Awaken the Guardian.
- Suicide Silence covered the song acoustic live at the Mitch Lucker Memorial Show.
- Primal Fear covered the song on their album Devil's Ground.
- Dragonfly covered the song on their 2011 album Non Requiem.
- Finnish Black Sabbath tribute band Sapattivuosi covered this song on their album Ihmisen merkki in Finnish as "Yö saa".

== Dirty Women ==
Eighth track on album "Technical Ecstasy"

- The Hellacopters covered the song on their album "Cream of the Crap Vol. 2"
- Finnish Black Sabbath tribute band Sapattivuosi covered this song on their album Sapattivuosi Vol. 2 in Finnish as 'Tarvin pimuu'.

== Disturbing the Priest ==
Third track on the album "Born Again".

- American death metal band Coffin Texts covered the song on the 1999 tribute album Hell Rules. The same recording later appeared on their debut album Gods of Creation, Death & Afterlife.

== Electric Funeral ==
Fifth track on their album "Paranoid".

- Jazz Sabbath in 2024 on their album The 1968 Tapes.
- Pantera covered the song for Black Sabbath tribute album "Nativity in Black II".
- Iced Earth covered the song on their album "The Melancholy E.P.".
- Vitamin String Quartet covered the song on the album "The String Quartet Tribute to Black Sabbath".
- Cavalera Conspiracy covered the song on their second album "Blunt Force Trauma"
- Primus covered the song live "Les Claypool".
- American death metal band Brutality, in 1994 on their album When the Sky Turns Black
- Candlemass third album Ancient Dreams has a bonus track titled Black Sabbath Medley which includes 1:04 snippet of Electric Funeral.
- Finnish Black Sabbath tribute band Sapattivuosi covered this song on their album Sapattivuosi Vol. 2 in Finnish as 'Sähköhauta'.
- Krisiun in 2015, on their album Forged in Fury.
- The 2017 covers album by Slothrust, titled Show Me How You Want It To Be, includes a cover version of "Electric Funeral".
- Brownout released this song on their 2016 "Brown Sabbath, Vol. 2" LP on Ubiquity Records.

== Fairies Wear Boots ==
Last track on the album "Paranoid".

- American all-female metal band Phantom Blue covered the song on their 1995 album Prime Cuts & Glazed Donuts.
- American thrash metal band Flotsam & Jetsam recorded the song in 2008 and included it on the remastered version of their fifth studio album, Drift.
- American glam rock band Toilet Böys include the song on their EP Sinners and Saints.
- Rose Hill Drive, an American power trio, covered "Fairies Wear Boots" at the 2007 Hyde Park Calling festival.
- American jam band Widespread Panic covered the song during their summer 2007 tour and opened the 31 Oct 2010 NOLAween show in tribute to Ozzy who was playing at the nearby Voodoo Experience.
- American metal band Fozzy released a cover of the song as a bonus track on their 2012 album Sin and Bones.
- Finnish Black Sabbath tribute band Sapattivuosi covered this song on their debut album in Finnish as 'Keijujen kengät'.
- Jazz Sabbath released an instrumental jazz rendition of this song on their self-titled debut album.
- Brownout released this song on their 2016 "Brown Sabbath, Vol. 2" LP on Ubiquity Records.

== Hand of Doom ==
Sixth track on the album "Paranoid".

- Danzig in 1996, on their album Blackacidevil.
- Orange Goblin on a their EP Nuclear Guru.
- Slayer in 2000, on the tribute album "Nativity in Black II".
- Reverend on their 1990 album "World Won't Miss You" (bonus track).
- Tool live at the Back to the Beginning festival in 2025.

== Heaven and Hell ==
Fourth track on the album "Heaven and Hell".

- The American doom metal band Solitude Aeturnus covered the song for their album Adagio.
- The song's intro was used during The Freddie Mercury Tribute Concert to introduce Tony Iommi.
- Benedictum covered the song on their debut album, Uncreation.
- Liechtenstein based gothic metal band Elis covered the song on their 2006 album Griefshire.
- The song was also briefly covered by Tenacious D for Dio's music video for the song "Push". At the beginning of the music video, Jack Black and Kyle Gass are shown standing on a sidewalk busking and singing "Heaven and Hell" with alternate lyrics. They stop when Dio walks up to them and tells them that he will pay them to play some Tenacious D songs.
- Thrash band Overkill can be heard rehearsing the song at the end of their 1994 album W.F.O., along with "The Ripper" of Judas Priest.
- Progressive metal band Dream Theater covered the song and released it under their official bootleg "Uncovered 2003–2005".
- Heavy metal band Manowar covered the song at the Sonisphere Festival in Bucharest. A studio version of the cover was released on the album Magic: A Tribute to Ronnie James Dio.
- Thrash metal band Anthrax covered some of the song at "The Big 4" Sonisphere concert in Sofia, Prague, Warsaw, Bucharest, Istanbul, Stockholm and Athens, and also at other Sonisphere events such as Knebworth House. The concert was released as the DVD/Blu-ray The Big Four: Live from Sofia, Bulgaria.
- Christian glam metal band Stryper released a cover of the song as the first single from their 2011 album, The Covering.
- Rock band Coheed and Cambria covered the song.
- American thrash metal band Death Angel recorded cover of Heaven and Hell as bonus track on US limited digipack The Dreams Call for Blood.
- American rock band Bridger covered the song on their self-titled album.
- Finnish Black Sabbath tribute band Sapattivuosi covered this song on their album Ihmisen merkki in Finnish as 'Tuli ja maa'.
- Belarusian rock band Molchat Doma covered the song with a dark wave sound and Russian lyrics for the tribute/compilation album What Is This That Stands Before Me?.

== Hole in the Sky ==
First track on the album "Sabotage".

- Jazz Sabbath in 2024 on the Record Store Day edition of their album The 1968 Tapes.
- Overkill covered the song on the album "Fuck You and Then Some".
- Pantera covered this on the album "The Best of Pantera: Far Beyond the Great Southern Cowboys' Vulgar Hits!".
- Confessor covered the song on the album "Masters of Misery: The Black Sabbath Earache Tribute".
- Metallica covered this during Black Sabbath's rock and roll hall of fame induction in 2006.
- Machine Head cover the song on the 2008 bonus disc of the album "The Blackening".

== I ==
Ninth track on the album "Dehumanizer".

- Viking/Folk metal band Týr (band) covers "I" on the 2011 album "The Lay of Thrym".
- Brazilian thrash metal band Ancesttral covers "I" on the 2012 EP "Bloodshed and Violence".

== Into the Void ==
Last track on the album "Master of Reality".

Various artists have covered the song, including

- Jazz Sabbath
- Kyuss
- Sleep
- Dr. Know
- Cavity
- Exhorder
- Lumsk
- Soundgarden
- Melvins
- Monster Magnet
- Orange Goblin
- Cancer Bats
- Jiří Schelinger
- Candlemass
- Las Cruces
- Brownout released this song on their 2014 "Brown Sabbath" LP on Ubiquity Records.

== Iron Man ==
Fourth track on the album Paranoid (1970).

- Green Day covered part of the song live
- The Cardigans covered the song on their 1996 album First Band on the Moon.
- Cat Rapes Dog covered the song for the 1990 single "Fundamental"
- Electric Eel Shock from Japan recorded an up tempo version on their 2005 album Beat Me they also often open live shows with the intro.
- Giant Sand covered the song on their 2002 album Cover Magazine.
- The Bad Plus covered the song on their 2004 album Give.
- Sir Mix-a-Lot (backed by metal band Metal Church) covered the song with new lyrics on Mix-A-Lot's 1988 album Swass.
- NOFX recorded a cover of the song which was released years later on their 1992 compilation, Maximum Rocknroll.
- Northern Irish band Therapy? covered the song for the 1994 Black Sabbath tribute album Nativity in Black. Vocals on the track were provided by Ozzy Osbourne, who sang on the original.
- Busta Rhymes used the song on his 1998 album, E.L.E. (Extinction Level Event): The Final World Front, as the backing for the song "This Means War", keeping the original chorus. Ozzy Osbourne is featured as a guest vocalist. This song is also featured on the second Nativity in Black tribute album.
- Marilyn Manson and the Spooky Kids covered the song on their 1990 demos, albeit with the lyrics altered to make reference to the Son of Sam murders.
- Metallica covered the song when Black Sabbath was introduced in the Rock and Roll Hall of Fame in 2006.
- Pearl Jam vocalist Eddie Vedder has, on occasion, such as at the Reading Festival 2007, played the song humorously on ukulele.
- Kanye West samples the song on his song "Hell of a Life" on his album, My Beautiful Dark Twisted Fantasy.
- Four Tet performs an instrumental cover on the Black Sabbath covers album Everything Comes & Goes.
- William Shatner covers the song alongside Zakk Wylde (former Ozzy Osbourne guitarist) on his 2011 album Seeking Major Tom.
- Comedian Bob Rivers recorded a parody as the title track of his album I Am Santa Claus.
- Cancer Bats covered Iron Man on their EP "Bat Sabbath Bastard of Reality".
- Finnish Black Sabbath tribute band Sapattivuosi covered this song on their debut album in Finnish as 'Rautamies'.
- Electroclash group Add N To (X) performed a cover version as the B side of their 7-inch single "Revenge Of The Black Regent".
- Jazz Sabbath released an instrumental jazz rendition of this song on their self-titled debut album.
- Brownout released this song on their 2014 "Brown Sabbath" LP on Ubiquity Records.

== It's Alright ==
Third track on the album "Technical Ecstasy".

- Guns N' Roses covered the song on their album "Live Era '87-'93".

== Jerusalem ==
Third track on the album "Tyr"

- Tony Martin on "Back Where I Belong" 1992

== Killing Yourself to Live ==
Fifth track on the album "Sabbath Bloody Sabbath".

- Anal Cunt covered the song on the album "Masters of Misery:The Black Sabbath Earache Tribute".
- Finnish Black Sabbath tribute band Sapattivuosi covered this song on their debut album in Finnish as 'Elävinä kuolleisiin'.

== Letters from Earth ==
Fourth track on the album "Dehumanizer".

- Jørn Lande covers "Letters from Earth" with the song "Lonely is the Word" on his album "Unlocking the Past" and on his tribute to Ronnie James Dio.

== Lord of This World ==
Sixth track on the album "Master of Reality".

- Corrosion of Conformity covered the song on the album "Nativity in Black:A Tribute to Black Sabbath".
- Brutal Truth covered the song on the album "Extreme Conditions Demand Extreme Responses".
- Quix*o*tic covered the song on the album "Mortal Mirror".
- Helmet covered the song on the album "Volume Eleven: Reading Special".
- A live cover of the song is included on the EP "Volume Two" by Sleep.
- Clutch started covering this song in 2022 and a version is included on the digital release PA Tapes (Live In Seattle, 10/10/2022).

== Megalomania ==
Fourth track on the album "Sabotage".

- Venom covered the song on the album "Prime Evil".

== The Mob Rules ==
Fifth track on the album "Mob Rules".

- Fozzy covered the song on the album "Happenstance".
- Benedictum covered the song on their debut album, Uncreation
- Adrenaline Mob covered the song on the album "Adrenaline Mob EP".
- Iced Earth covered the song on their 2011 album "Dystopia".
- Finnish Black Sabbath tribute band Sapattivuosi covered this song on their album Ihmisen merkki in Finnish as 'Laki 666'.
- Blue Manner Haze covered the Song on the Album 'Blue Manner Haze'.

== Neon Knights ==
First track on the album "Heaven and Hell".

- Steel Prophet covered the song on the album "Holy Dio:A Tribute to the Voice of Metal (disc 2)".
- Iron Savior covered the song on the album "Unification".
- Westworld covered the song on the album "Cyberdreams".
- Queensrÿche covered the song on the album "Take Cover".
- Barón Rojo covered the song on the album "Perversiones".
- Greek power metal band Innerwish covered Neon Knights on compilation "Sabbath Cadabra: A Greek Tribute to Black Sabbath".
- Anthrax covered the song on the tribute album "Ronnie James Dio – This Is Your Life".
- Finnish Black Sabbath tribute band Sapattivuosi covered this song on their album Ihmisen merkki in Finnish as 'Pelon lait'.
- Witchery covered this song

== Never Say Die! ==
First track on the album "Never Say Die!".

- The song was covered by Megadeth on the Black Sabbath tribute album "Nativity in Black II".
- It was also covered by Overkill on their 1999 cover album "Coverkill".
- Karma to Burn's 2011 album 'V' closes with a cover of "Never Say Die."
- Ozzy Osbourne performed "Never Say Die" for his live album "Speak of the Devil".
- Baltimoore released a covers album in 2003 titled "Ultimate Tribute" with track 4 being "Never Say Die!".
- Finnish Black Sabbath tribute band Sapattivuosi covered this song on their album Sapattivuosi Vol. 2 in Finnish as 'Ei saa luovuttaa'.

== N.I.B. ==
Fourth track on the album "Black Sabbath".

- Jazz Sabbath in 2022 on their album Vol.2.
- Ugly Kid Joe covered the song on the album "Nativity in Black: A Tribute to Black Sabbath".
- Pitchshifter covered the song on the "Triad" single.
- Ozzy Osbourne performed the song for his live album "Speak of the Devil".
- Type O Negative covered the song on the album "Nativity in Negativity (Nativity disc)".
- Cave In covered the song on the album "Relapse Sampler 1999".
- Primus covered the song on the album "Nativity in Black II: A Tribute to Black Sabbath".
- Acid Drinkers covered the song on the album "Fishdick".
- Cancer Bats covered N.I.B. on their EP "Bat Sabbath Bastard of Reality".
- Danzig covered the song on their 2015 album Skeletons.
- Krokus open the 2017 album "Big Rocks" with a 1:16 snippet of the N.I.B. riff
- Finnish Black Sabbath tribute band Sapattivuosi covered this song on their debut album in Finnish as 'S.Ä.N.K.I.'.
- Carnivore (band) covered N.I.B at a show at L'Amour BKLYN in 1989.
- Zakk Wylde covered the song for Loudwire YouTube Channel, on a Hello Kitty Mini-Guitar, as well as an acoustic cover for SiriusXM YouTube Channel.
- Brownout released this song on their 2014 "Brown Sabbath" LP on Ubiquity Records.

== Over and Over ==
Last track on the album "Mob Rules".

Cover versions of "Over and Over were performed by:

- Pallbearer on their "Fear and Fury" EP.

== Paranoid ==
Second track on the album "Paranoid".

Cover versions of "Paranoid" were performed by:

- Cindy & Bert: "Der Hund von Baskerville" – German schlager version, 1971. This version has been covered in turn by Church of Misery.
- Jazz Sabbath in 2022 on their album Vol.2.
- Heavy metal band Megadeth for the Black Sabbath tribute album, Nativity in Black. At the end of the recording, while the rest of the band stops, drummer Nick Menza continues playing until singer Dave Mustaine shouts to him, to which Menza replies profanely. The cover was later nominated for a Grammy, and appeared on the Hidden Treasures EP.
- The Dickies on their album The Incredible Shrinking Dickies.
- The Dillinger Escape Plan for the reissue of their Under the Running Board EP.
- Avenged Sevenfold on a tribute album called Covered, A Revolution in Sound.
- Hellsongs on their debut EP Lounge and again on Hymns in the Key of 666.
- Type O Negative on their Origin Of The Feces EP.
- The Clay People for the Black Sabbath tribute album, Tribute To Black Sabbath: Eternal Masters.
- 3rd Strike on their album Lost Angel.
- Soviet (later Russian) heavy/thrash-metal band Master(rus. Мастер) on their album Talk of the Devil.
- Mystic Prophecy as a bonus track on their album Satanic Curses.
- Steel Pole Bath Tub as a track on their debut album Butterfly Love.
- Gus Black as a track on his album Uncivilized Love.
- George Lynch as a track on his album Guitar Slinger (with Mötley Crüe's singer Vince Neil).
- Adam Parfrey in the album A Sordid Evening of Sonic Sorrows.
- Green Day played it live on their 21st Century Breakdown World Tour
- Big Country Recorded it and released in on Disc2 of the Ships UK Limited Edition 2 x CD Single Set
- Queens of the Stone Age live at the VH1 Rock Honors in 2007.
- New wave of British heavy metal band Angel Witch covered this song in their 1980's tours
- Metallica played it live at the 25th Anniversary of Rock and Roll Hall of Fame in 2009, with Osbourne guest singing. This track is playable in the video game Guitar Hero: Warriors of Rock.
- Show of Hands played a comedic snippet of the song live, which features in the hidden track on As You Were.
- Ministry on their album Undercover
- Kylesa on their album Exhausting Fire
- Extra Hot Sauce on their album Taco of Death
- German grindcore band Nyctophobic, as a ghost track on their album Insects
- Weezer on their album Teal Album
- Avenged Sevenfold on their album Live in the LBC & Diamonds in the Rough
- Skrewdriver, a neo-Nazi band, covered the song on their live album Live at Waterloo '92. The end of the track includes a monologue from their lead singer about a police attempt to shut down the gig, as well as some anti-Semitic comments.
- "Corporal Gander's Fire Dog Brigade", a short-lived German rock band, covered the song on their only studio album "On The Rocks" in 1970.

== Planet Caravan ==
Third track on the album "Paranoid".

- The Anomoanon covered this song on the Black Sabbath tribute album Everything Comes & Goes.
- Pantera covered the song on the album Far Beyond Driven.
- Mercury Rev as part of a 2001 John Peel radio session and as a B-side on CD1 of their 2002 single The Dark Is Rising.
- Clive Jones of Black Widow and Agony Bag in 2007.
- Cable on In These Black Days: Volume 4, a tribute to Black Sabbath.
- Estonian band Rondellus covered this song in Medieval style, on their tribute album Sabbatum, for voice, lute and psaltery. In their version the lyrics are translated into Latin, and the song has been retitled "Planetarum Vagatio" (literally, "Wandering of the Planets").
- Finnish Black Sabbath tribute band Sapattivuosi covered this song on their album Vol. 2 in Finnish as 'Planeettakaravaani'.
- Brownout released this song on their 2014 "Brown Sabbath" LP on Ubiquity Records.

== Rat Salad ==
Seventh track on the album "Paranoid".

- Jazz Sabbath released an instrumental jazz rendition of this song on their self-titled debut album.

== Sabbath Bloody Sabbath ==
First track on the album "Sabbath Bloody Sabbath".

- Bruce Dickinson covered the song with American band Godspeed on the tribute album Nativity in Black.
- Swedish pop band The Cardigans covered this song on their 1994 album, Emmerdale (album).
- The thrash metal band Anthrax also covered the song on their 1987 EP I'm the Man.
- Bluegrass band Iron Horse covered "Sabbath Bloody Sabbath" on their album Black & Bluegrass: A Tribute to Ozzy Osbourne & Black Sabbath.
- Melbourne, Australia-based group bZARK covered "Sabbath Bloody Sabbath" on their 1998 EP, "I Don't Know How It Is (But I'm Gonna Tell You Anyway)."
- Covered by Today Is the Day on the Hydra Head seven inch tribute In These Black Days. Included as a hidden bonus track on their album Temple of the Morning Star.
- Horror metal band Ripper has covered the song for their album 'Third Witness' released in 2015 by Black Widow Records
- Austrian blackened death metal group Belphegor for their debut album the Last Supper.
- Swedish melodic death metal band Amon Amarth on the Viking Edition bonus disc of their album Versus the World.
- German hard rock band iRockers Crew has covered this song on YouTube in 2014.
- Epic Doom Metal band Candlemass included 50 seconds on Black Sabbath Medley which is a bonus track on Ancient Dreams.
- Brownout released this song on their 2016 "Brown Sabbath, Vol. 2" LP on Ubiquity Records.

== Sabbra Cadabra ==
Fourth track on the album "Sabbath Bloody Sabbath".

- Jazz Sabbath in 2022 on their album Vol.2.
- The heavy metal band Metallica covered this song and "A National Acrobat" on their Garage Inc. cover album in one condensed song entitled "Sabbra Cadabra".
- American punk rock band Hed PE covered "Sabbra Cadabra" for the tribute album Nativity in Black II.

== The Shining ==
First track on the album "The Eternal Idol"

- Ronnie Romero from "Raised On Heavy Radio" 2023

== Shock Wave ==
Fifth track on the album "Never Say Die!".

- Cathedral covered the song on the album "Masters of Misery - Black Sabbath: An Earache Tribute".

== Sleeping Village ==
The intro to "Sleeping Village" has been performed by many Black Sabbath tribute bands.

== Snowblind ==
Sixth track on the album "Black Sabbath Vol. 4"

- Jazz Sabbath in 2022 on their album Vol.2.
- Alternative metal band System of a Down for the Black Sabbath tribute album Nativity in Black II. This version also appears on The Osbourne Family Album, as a B-side of "Aerials" vinyl and on "Lonely Day" single.
- Converge live on their EP Y2K.
- Zakk Wylde's Black Label Society on Alcohol Fueled Brewtality.
- Stoner metal band Sleep on Masters of Misery-Black Sabbath: The Earache Tribute and later on a re-issue of their album Sleep's Holy Mountain.
- Rock band Pigboat on their 2009 release Float.
- Finnish Black Sabbath tribute band Sapattivuosi covered this song on their debut album in Finnish as 'Hankikanto'.
- John Frusciante
- Brownout released this song on their 2016 "Brown Sabbath, Vol. 2" LP on Ubiquity Records.

== Solitude ==
Seventh track on the album "Master of Reality".

- UK doom metal band Cathedral as a bonus track for the European version of the 1994 Black Sabbath tribute album "Nativity in Black".
- Norwegian group Ulver on the 2007 album "Shadows of the Sun".
- Swedish Progressive group Opeth as a bonus track on their 2014 album "Pale Communion".
- Finnish Black Sabbath tribute band Sapattivuosi on their 2003 self-titled debut as 'Yksinään', with lyrics in Finnish.
- Norwegian Progressive Metal outfit Green Carnation on the 2020 album Leaves of Yesteryear.
- American Metal band Kill Devil Hill on "Seas Of Oblivion" 2023

== Spiral Architect ==
Last track on the album "Sabbath Bloody Sabbath".

- This song was covered by Finnish cello metal band Apocalyptica for a free tribute CD issued by Metal Hammer magazine, as well as the iTunes deluxe edition of their album 7th Symphony.
- Finnish tribute band Sapattivuosi covered this song on their Vol 2. album in Finnish as 'Kierteen arkkitehti'.
- Jazz Sabbath in 2024 on their album The 1968 Tapes.

== St. Vitus Dance ==
Ninth track on the album "Black Sabbath Vol. 4".

- Cathedral covered the song on the album "After Forever".

== Supernaut ==
Fifth track on the album "Black Sabbath Vol. 4".

- Jazz Sabbath in 2024 on their album The 1968 Tapes.
- 1000 Homo DJs on their Supernaut single, and for the Black Sabbath tribute album Nativity in Black. An alternate version featuring vocals by Trent Reznor of Nine Inch Nails appears on the Black Box – Wax Trax! Records: The First 13 Years compilation.
- Coalesce on the 2007 reissue of their Led Zeppelin tribute EP entitled There is Nothing New Under the Sun and also on the Hydra Head Records Black Sabbath tribute album In These Black Days: Vol. 3.
- Ministry on their 1992 Psalm 69 tour, and on their album Cover Up.
- O'Connor (from Argentina) for Hay un Lugar (1999).
- Turisas for a cover CD issued by UK magazine Metal Hammer.
- The joint venture of Los Coronas and Arizona Baby covered the song in their 2011 live album Dos Bandas y un Destino.
- The Mexican Rock Band Supernauta named the band after the Black Sabbath's song.
- Candlemass included a minute of this song in Black Sabbath Medley on their album Ancient Dreams.
- Finnish Black Sabbath tribute band Sapattivuosi covered this song on their album Sapattivuosi Vol. 2 in Finnish as 'Supernautti'.
- Brownout released this song on their 2016 "Brown Sabbath, Vol. 2" LP on Ubiquity Records.
- Doom Metal band Trouble often covered the song live

== Sweet Leaf ==
First track on the album "Master of Reality".

- Ugly Kid Joe on their 1991 EP As Ugly as They Wanna Be.
- Six Yard Box on their 1993 Imagination Is Greater Than Knowledge
- Storm Orphans on the 1993 Marijuana's Greatest Hits Revisited.
- Sacred Reich on the 1995 compilation album Hempilation: Freedom Is NORML.
- Stuck Mojo on their 1996 EP Violated.
- Mogwai on a 1998 split single with Magoo on Fierce Panda Records
- Ancient on the 1999 Det Glemte Riket.
- Godsmack on the 2000 Black Sabbath tribute album Nativity in Black II.
- Six Feet Under on their 2000 album Graveyard Classics.
- Bigelf on their 2001 EP Goatbridge Palace.
- Galactic on their 2001 live album We Love 'Em Tonight: Live at Tipitina's.
- Gov't Mule on their 2003 DVD The Deepest End, Live In Concert.
- Widespread Panic on their 2004 live album Jackassolantern.
- Sapattivuosi on their 2005 Vol. 2.
- Alexisonfire on the 2006 Trailer Park Boys The Movie Soundtrack.
- Thou on the 2009 EP Through the Empires of Eternal Void.
- Candlemass bonus track song Black Sabbath Medley on Ancient Dreams includes 54 seconds.
- Brownout released this song on their 2016 "Brown Sabbath, Vol. 2" LP on Ubiquity Records.

== Symptom of the Universe ==
Third track on the album "Sabotage".

- Jazz Sabbath in 2022 on their album Vol.2.
- The thrash metal band Sepultura covered the song for the Black Sabbath tribute album, "Nativity in Black".
- The song has also been covered by Helmet, noticeably in the film The Jerky Boys: The Movie, in which they are featured as the club band with Ozzy Osbourne guest-starring as their manager.
- Finnish thrash metal band Stone released a version as a bonus track on their 2008 compilation Stoneage 2.0.
- American rock band Comes With the Fall have also covered in on their album Live 2002.
- In the documentary A Year and a Half in the Life of Metallica, Metallica guitarist Kirk Hammett can be seen jamming the main riff to the song in his hotel room. It was also covered in 2010 by Orange Goblin for a Metal Hammer tribute CD to Black Sabbath and by the Melvins in 1989 on their Melvins/Mudhoney split 7-inch Album.
- Ukrainian thrash metal band Violent Omen covered the song on their full-length album "Lunatic's Revenge" released in April 2011.
- UK based thrash metal band Deathwish covered the song on their second full-length album "Demon Preacher".
- Candlemass open the song Black Sabbath Medley with 1:30 of this song on the album Ancient Dreams.
- Finnish Black Sabbath tribute band Sapattivuosi covered this song on their album Sapattivuosi Vol. 2 in Finnish as 'Matka universumiin'.
- Brownout released this song on their 2016 "Brown Sabbath, Vol. 2" LP on Ubiquity Records.
- English crustcore band Doom on their "Peel Sessions" album.

== The Sign of the Southern Cross ==
Third track on the album "Mob Rules".

- Fates Warning covered the song on the album "Holy Dio: A Tribute to the Voice of Metal (disc 1)".
- Finnish Black Sabbath tribute band Sapattivuosi covered this song on their album Ihmisen merkki in Finnish as 'Ihmisen merkki'.

== The Wizard ==
Second song on the album "Black Sabbath".

- Jazz Sabbath in 2024 on their album The 1968 Tapes.
- The song was covered by Rob Halford's band Bullring Brummies for the Black Sabbath tribute album "Nativity in Black".
- The song was covered by Zakk Wylde's band Pride & Glory on the second disc of the reissue of "Pride & Glory". Wylde had also been a member of Ozzy Osbourne's solo band at the time.
- Scorn covered the song on the album "Masters of Misery: The Black Sabbath Earache Tribute".
- Zakk Wylde also covered the song on the album "Rare Trax".
- Botch covered the song on the album "Cave in/Botch".
- Finley Quaye covered the song on the album "Spiritualized".
- Shihad covered the song on the EP album "Devolve".
- Brand New Sin covered this song as track 16 on their 2011 album "United State".
- Finnish Black Sabbath tribute band Sapattivuosi covered this song on their debut album in Finnish as 'Parantaja'.
- Brownout released this song on their 2014 "Brown Sabbath" LP on Ubiquity Records.

== Time Machine ==
Sixth track on the album "Dehumanizer".

- Pegasus covered the song on the album "Death... Is Just the Beginning, Volume 6 (disc 1)".

== Tomorrow's Dream ==
Second track on the album "Black Sabbath Vol. 4".

- Seattle band Screaming Trees as the b-side of their 1992 single "Dollar Bill".
- Canadian band Sheavy on their Untitled 3-song 7-inch.

== TV Crimes ==
Third track on the album "Dehumanizer".

- Plan 4 covered the song on the album "Sabbath Crosses: Tributo a Black Sabbath".

== Under the Sun/Every Day Comes and Goes ==
Last track on the album "Black Sabbath Vol. 4

- Soulfly for the Black Sabbath tribute album Nativity in Black II.
- Bongzilla for Stash.
- Entombed for Family Favourites.

== War Pigs ==
First track on the album "Paranoid".

- Jazz Sabbath in 2024 on their album The 1968 Tapes.
- Future Sabbath member Ronnie James Dio's early 1970s band, Elf, covered the song regularly in concert.
- Sacred Reich on the EP Surf Nicaragua and their live EP Alive at the Dynamo.
- PIG on the Prime Evil EP.
- Faith No More on the CD release of their 1989 album The Real Thing and the 1991 Live at the Brixton Academy concert album. The Brixton performance was also released on the Nativity in Black tribute album.
- Psychedelic punk band Alice Donut have recorded a brass band version of this song on their 1991 opus, Revenge Fantasies of the Impotent.
- Gov't Mule on their 1999 album Live... With a Little Help from Our Friends.
- Hayseed Dixie on A Hot Piece of Grass.
- Tesla on Real to Reel.
- Cake on their 2007 album B-Sides and Rarities.
- Alex Skolnick Trio on their 2002 album Goodbye to Romance: Standards for a New Generation.
- The Acacia Strain covered the song for the video game Homefront.
- Cover version is featured in Guitar Hero 2 and is downloadable content for Rock Band.
- Celldweller released a mash-up of War Pigs and Metallica's "Disposable Heroes", titled "Disposable War Pigs", as a free download in 2011.
- Reef covered the song live in 2003 and it was recorded at the Bristol Academy and put out on the B-side to the Waster single.
- The Dresden Dolls covered the song live numerous times. Also it can be found on Live: In Paradise DVD.
- Weezer covered the song in concert during their 2009 tour.
- Magdalen on their 1994 album The Dirt
- Bathory covered the song on the album In Memory of Quorthon Volume II.
- Cancer Bats covered War Pigs on their EP "Bat Sabbath Bastard of Reality".
- The Flaming Lips have covered "War Pigs" regularly in concert.
- Arctic Monkeys often play part of the song during the live performance of "Arabella", from the AM album (2013).
- Foo Fighters and Zac Brown from Zac Brown Band also covered the song
- iRockers Crew has covered this song on YouTube in 2015.
- Finnish Black Sabbath tribute band Sapattivuosi covered this song on their album Sapattivuosi Vol. 2 in Finnish as 'Sotasiat'.
- Dutch DJ and Film Composer Junkie XL orchestrated and remixed this song, which was used at the end of 300: Rise of an Empire, He also composed the score for the film.
- Ruthie Foster covered the song on her 2017 album Joy Comes Back.
- Brass Against recorded a version for their album Brass Against II in 2019.
- Post Malone performed a cover of the song for a New Year's Eve performance on 31 December 2020.
- Japanese post-rock band toe covered the song as a bonus track on the Japanese release of their Our Latest Number EP. They have also played it in concert.
- The song has been sampled by Ice-T in his song "Intro/Rhyme Pays" on the album Rhyme Pays.
- T-Pain recorded a version for his covers album On Top of the Covers in 2023.
- Judas Priest released a cover in 2025.
- Buckethead covered the song on his 2024 and 2025 concert tours.

== Wheels of Confusion/The Straightener ==
First track on the album "Black Sabbath Vol. 4".

- Estonian band Rondellus on their tribute album Sabbatum, sung by two female voices accompanied by a frame drum. Their version has lyrics translated into Latin, and the song has been retitled "Rotae Confusionis".
- Doom metal band Cathedral on the tribute album Masters of Misery - The Earache Tribute.

== When Death Calls ==
Fourth track on the album "Headless Cross".

- Sorcerer in 2021 as a single.

== Who are You ==
Sixth track on the album "Sabbath Bloody Sabbath".

- OLD covered the song on the album "Tribute to Black Sabbath: Eternal Masters".
- Goatsnake covered the song on the album "1 + Dog Days".

== Wicked World ==
Last track on the North American edition of the album "Black Sabbath".

- Skinless band covered the song on the album "Trample the Weak, Hurdle the Dead".
- Doom/stoner metal band Spirit Caravan recorded the song for the 2002 compilation album "Sucking the 70s"

== Zero the Hero ==
Fifth track on the album "Born Again".

- Cannibal Corpse covered the song on the album "Tribute to Black Sabbath: Eternal Masters", which also appeared on their 1993 "Hammer Smashed Face" EP.
- German/American hard rock band Thunderhead covered the song on their 1995 album "Were You Told the Truth About Hell?".
- Godflesh covered the song on the tribute album Masters of Misery - The Earache Tribute.
