= Sapattivuosi =

Finnish tribute band

Sapattivuosi is a Finnish Black Sabbath tribute band singing in Finnish. The band was initiated as a project by vocalist Hannu Paloniemi, drummer Simo Vehmas, and guitarist Janne Halmkrona (also of CMX). Sapattivuosi's first two albums covered songs from the Ozzy Osbourne era. When vocalist Paloniemi left the band, he was replaced by Marko Hietala, known from bands such as Nightwish, Tarot and Northern Kings. Hietala first appeared with Sapattivuosi on their single Pelon lait (a cover of Neon Knights), which came out on 4 March 2009. The band's third full-length album, Ihmisen merkki, also covers songs from Black Sabbath's Ronnie James Dio era. It was released on 1 April 2009.

All three Sapattivuosi albums made the Finnish charts, with two making the top ten. At least two singles have also spent weeks at #4 on the charts.

== Members ==
- Janne Halmkrona (guitar)
- Antero Aunesluoma (bass)
- Simo Vehmas (drums)

=== Former members ===
- Hannu Paloniemi (vocals) (2000–2009)
- Marko Hietala (vocals, acoustic guitar) (2009–2013)

== Discography ==
=== Albums ===
==== Sapattivuosi (2003) ====
No.	Title	Length	Original
1.	"Hautuumaan lapset"	4:44	Children of the Grave
2.	"Elävinä kuolleisiin"	5:44	Killing Yourself to Live
3.	"Parantaja"	4:06	The Wizard
4.	"Hankikanto"	5:37	Snowblind
5.	"Yksinään"	4:22	Solitude
6.	"Rautamies"	6:14	Iron Man
7.	"Keijujen kengät"	5:59	Fairies Wear Boots
8.	"S.Ä.N.K.I."	5:29	N.I.B.

==== Sapattivuosi Vol. 2 (2005) ====
No.	Title	Length	Original
1.	"Ei saa luovuttaa"	3:56	Never Say Die
2.	"Kännin piikkiin"	4:30	Sweet Leaf
3.	"Sotasiat"	7:35	War Pigs
4.	"Kierteen arkkitehti"	5:17	Spiral Architect
5.	"Planeettakaravaani"	3:26	Planet Caravan
6.	"Ikuisuuden jälkeen"	5:10	After Forever
7.	"Sähköhauta"	4:31	Electric Funeral
8.	"Matka universumiin"	7:02	Symptom of the Universe
9.	"Tarvin pimuu"	7:24	Dirty Women
10.	"Supernautti"	4:29	Supernaut

==== Ihmisen merkki (2009) ====
No.	Title	Length	Original
1.	"Pelon lait"	3:52	Neon Knights
2.	"Maalaistyttö"	3:58	Country Girl
3.	"Uneen hukkuneet"	5:39	Children of the Sea
4.	"Tuli ja maa"	6:19	Heaven and Hell
5.	"Laki 666"	3:23	The Mob Rules
6.	"Valtaa"	4:45	Voodoo
7.	"Yö saa"	4:34	Die Young
8.	"Ihmisen merkki"	8:31	The Sign of the Southern Cross

=== Singles ===
- "Hautuumaan lapset" (2003)
- "Kännin piikkiin" (2005)
- "Pelon lait" (2009)
