= Veronica Freeman =

American singer

- Also known as: The V
- Born: December 17, 1967 (age 58)
- Origin: San Diego, California, U.S.
- Genres: Heavy metal, power metal
- Occupation: Singer
- Years active: 2005–present
- Website: benedictum.net

Veronica Freeman (born December 17, 1967), also known by her stage name "The V", is an American singer and the lead vocalist of the heavy metal band Benedictum. Her most recent album with Benedictum is Obey, released through Frontiers Records in 2013. In 2015, she released her first solo album, Now or Never, which includes two songs written and produced by Stryper frontman, Michael Sweet.

== Biography ==
When she was introduced to metal she felt in love with the power and the energy of it and was encouraged to try singing by her longtime friend Craig Goldy. Freeman and Pete Wells became close friends and she has said that there is something about his playing that inspires her to this day. They started writing together and were in a few bands together, including Medusa and then Malady. They felt that after playing quite a few local shows in San Diego that it was time to move forward and see what they could do musically on a new level and that is when they embarked on the project that is now Benedictum. With some help from Craig they were introduced to the musician Jeff Pilson, who helped promote the group. Freeman got married in 2007.

In July 2015, Freeman as The V, released her debut solo album, Now or Never, which features numerous guest appearances including Michael Sweet as writer and producer on the tracks, "Again" and "Love Should Be to Blame"; Tony Martin as vocalist on "King For a Day", and Chastain vocalist, Leather Leone on "Kiss My Lips".

== Influences ==
Her influences include Ronnie James Dio, Tina Turner, Melissa Etheridge, Etta James, Billie Holiday, Sarah Vaughan and Freddie Mercury.

== Discography ==
With Benedictum

- Uncreation (2006)
- Seasons of Tragedy (2008)
- Dominion (2011)
- Obey (2013)

As The V

- Now or Never (2015)

=== Albums (guest sessions) ===
Grave Digger

- Ballads of a Hangman (2009)

A Sound of Thunder

- Queen of Hell (2013) (duet vocals on title track)

Vastator

- Machine Hell (2010)

Lyraka

- Lyraka Volume 1 (2010)
- Lyraka Volume 2 (2012)
