= Miriam Slater =

American artist (born 1952)

Miriam Slater (born February 9, 1952, Los Angeles, California) is an American artist who paints both objects and paintings. She studied painting at California State University, Fullerton. After graduating in 1975 she began exhibiting in Los Angeles in shows such as “Imagination” curated by Llyn Foulkes at LAICA. She developed a celebrity clientele including Jack Nicholson, Brooke Astor, Quincy Jones and Jeff Bridges. From 1980 to 1990 she studied figure drawing with Harry Carmean at Art Center College of Design in Pasadena and exhibited at the Tobey Moss Gallery in Los Angeles with Lorser Feitelson and Helen Lundeberg.

Her work is in several museums including the Los Angeles County Museum of Art and the Experience Music Project Museum in Seattle. Miriam Slater is the daughter of hard edge artist Eva Slater and was married to the late figurative artist Harry Carmean until his death. She lives in Santa Barbara, California.

== Television & Radio ==
- 2011: “Arts and Antique Show” featured guest, AM 1290, Santa Barbara, 3/19/11
- 2008: "Carmean/Slater, the Figurative Tradition", 2007, Channel 21, Santa Barbara CA
- 2008: "Creative Community", featured guest 2007, Channel 21 Santa Barbara, CA
