= Eva Slater =

German-American painter (1922–2011)

- Born: 17 June 1922; Berlin, Germany
- Died: 2 May 2011 (aged 88); Santa Barbara, California
- Movement: Hard-Edge

Eva Slater (June 17, 1922 – May 2, 2011), a Hard-Edge artist was born in Berlin, Germany in 1922 and studied art at the Lette-Verein Academy. After World War II ended she moved to the United States where she worked as a fashion illustrator in New York City. After meeting her husband, John Slater, they moved to Los Angeles, California where she began studying painting at Art Center School of Design. It was there that she met Lorser Feitelson who founded the Los Angeles-based hard-edge art movement. Slater became a prominent member of the hard-edge movement from 1950 through the late 1960s.

Slater's hard-edge paintings are characterized by smooth, meticulously painted surfaces with elegant colors. Her unique contribution to the hard-edge movement was the use of intricate small triangles that would flow across the painting in irregular patterns. She referred to them as being much like “cells” which interlocked and helped to define the structure of the painting. The triangles concept was abandoned in the early sixties and she went on to make a small number of pure hard edge landscapes with large areas of flat color. She stopped painting in the late 1960s and became a scholar and collector of American Indian basketry, writing the book Panamint Shoshone Basketry, an American Art Form.

Slater died in Santa Barbara, in 2011.

== Publications ==
- 2011 “Finding Cool in Death Valley”, Ann Japanga Orange Coast Magazine, July
- 2011 "Rancho Mirage", Mallette, Leo, Arcadia Publishing, South Carolina
- 2010 “Eva Slater: The Death Valley Journey of a Modern Artist”, Ann Japenga, California Desert Art
- Slater, Eva, "Panamint Shoshone Basketry", Sagebrush Press 2000
- Frank, Peter, "Driven to Abstraction – Southern California and the Non-Objective World", 1950–80, Riverside Art Museum, 2006

== See also ==
- Hard-edge
- John Mclaughlin
- Karl Benjamin
- Frederick Hammersley
- Helen Lundeberg
- Lorser Feitelson
- Miriam Slater
