= Adam Wakeman =

English musician (born 1974)

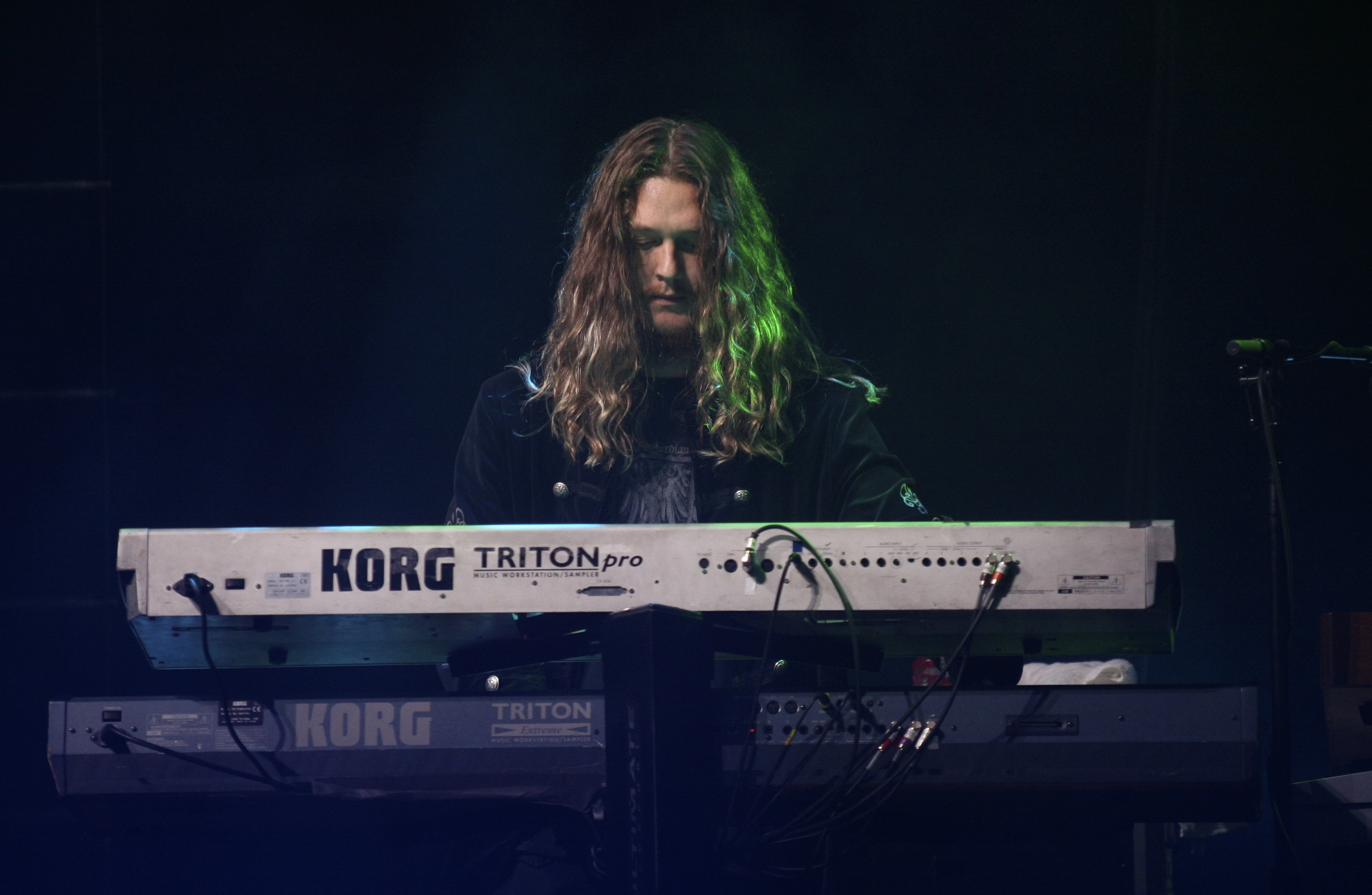
- Wakeman on Ozzy Osbourne's Black Rain world tour 2008

Background information
- Born: 11 March 1974 (age 52)
- Origin: England
- Genres: Progressive rock, pop, heavy metal, jazz
- Occupations: Musician
- Instruments: Keyboards, guitar
- Years active: 1992–present
- Member of: Headspace, Jazz Sabbath
- Formerly of: Ozzy Osbourne band, Black Sabbath, Strawbs, Snakecharmer
- Website: adamwakeman.co.uk

Adam Wakeman (born 11 March 1974) is an English musician, known as the keyboardist and rhythm guitarist for Ozzy Osbourne's band; he also played keyboards off-stage for Black Sabbath. Wakeman has also worked with Annie Lennox, Travis, the Company of Snakes, Strawbs, Will Young, Victoria Beckham, Atomic Kitten, Martin Barre, Uriah Heep and Deep Purple. He created the fictional character Milton Keanes, a disillusioned jazz pianist from the 1960s and released several YouTube mockumentaries and albums under the name Jazz Sabbath, with the album Volume 2 reaching number 6 on the Billboard Jazz Chart in 2022.

Wakeman has often collaborated with his father, Rick Wakeman, and has released albums with him. He has also released solo albums Soliloquy, 100 Years Overtime, Real World Trilogy and Neurasthenia. In 2006, he created his own band, Headspace, with Damian Wilson.

== Biography ==
Wakeman was born into a musical family as the younger brother of Oliver Wakeman and the son of long-term Yes keyboardist Rick Wakeman. He started playing classical piano at the age of eight. He cites Dr. John, Monty Alexander, Jordan Rudess of Dream Theater and Mark Kelly of Marillion as influences, with the solo from Marillion's "Incommunicado" one of the first he learned to play as a child. By the age of seventeen he had obtained grade eight from the ABRSM and had recorded the first album with his father. Father and son toured extensively, the two of them sitting at grand pianos to full scale rock performances with orchestra and choir. At the age of 24, Adam won the Keyboard Magazine Best New Talent award and promptly started a session career of his own in London.

In the mid-1990s, Wakeman formed Jeronimo Road with Fraser Thorneycroft-Smith. An album, Live at the Orange, was released after the band broke up on the Explore Multimedia label. In 2000 and 2001, he toured with his father's old band the Strawbs.

In 2006, he put together the progressive rock band Headspace, with vocalist Damian Wilson, guitarist Pete Rinaldi, bass player Lee Pomeroy and drummer Richard Brook. Their EP entitled I am... was released in 2007 to coincide with support shows at Wembley Arena, Birmingham's NIA and Dublin's The Point with Ozzy Osbourne. They released their debut concept album I Am Anonymous worldwide on 22 May 2012 on the Inside Out / Century Media record label.

He recorded several albums with Rick, as Wakeman with Wakeman, and he also participated on three of his father's solo albums. He also participated in Rick's tours from 1992, and he appeared in the Border TV's 1996 broadcast and VHS presentation of The New Gospels from the Isle of Man, the DVD from the Gran Rex, Argentina as well as 2009's Six Wives of Henry VIII at Hampton Court Palace. The 2010 release, Scream, from Ozzy Osbourne featured five songs co-written by Adam Wakeman, although an error in the liner notes means the track "I Want It More" was wrongly credited to only Osbourne and Kevin Churko.

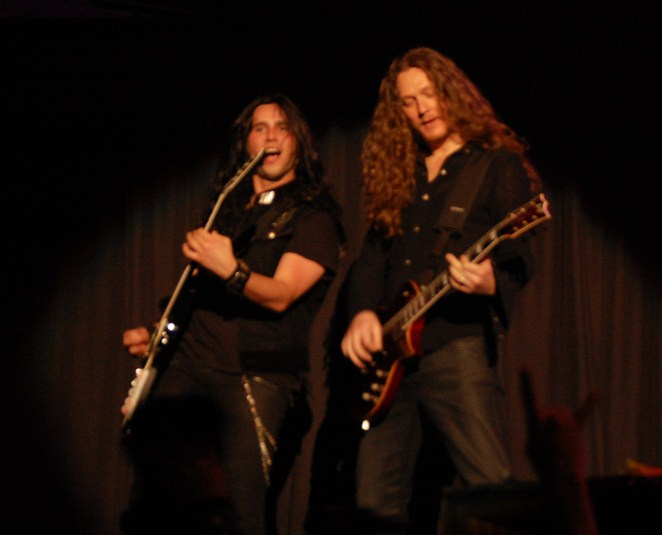
Wakeman (right) performing in 2011

With over 200 pieces of music composed for several production music libraries, Wakeman started www.theperfectmusiclibrary in 2010 representing and creating music for film, television and media. As director of the company, he has placed music across most major TV networks including the BBC, ITV and Sky.

On 2 July 2011, Wakeman started his own radio show on TotalRock radio in London along with fellow members of Headspace, where he (once a month, every first Saturday) playing "the best rock, metal and prog over the last 30 years".

Also in 2011, Wakeman joined with original Whitesnake members Micky Moody and Neil Murray, Laurie Wisefield (Wishbone Ash), Harry James (Thunder, Magnum), and Chris Ousey (Heartland) to form the band Snakecharmer.

In November 2012, Wakeman joined the Strawbs, a band which also previously featured his brother and father, for their tour of that year, he toured with them again in 2015.

In 2020, Adam Wakeman joined Martin Barre for his Latin-American tour.

In February 2020, Wakeman released an album under the moniker Jazz Sabbath, playing songs by Black Sabbath in a jazz style. He is credited as "Milton Keanes".

Adam stepped in to cover for Don Airey with Deep Purple in Bangalore, India December 19th 2023 after Don fell ill a week before. In 2025, he took part in Back to the Beginning.

== Discography ==
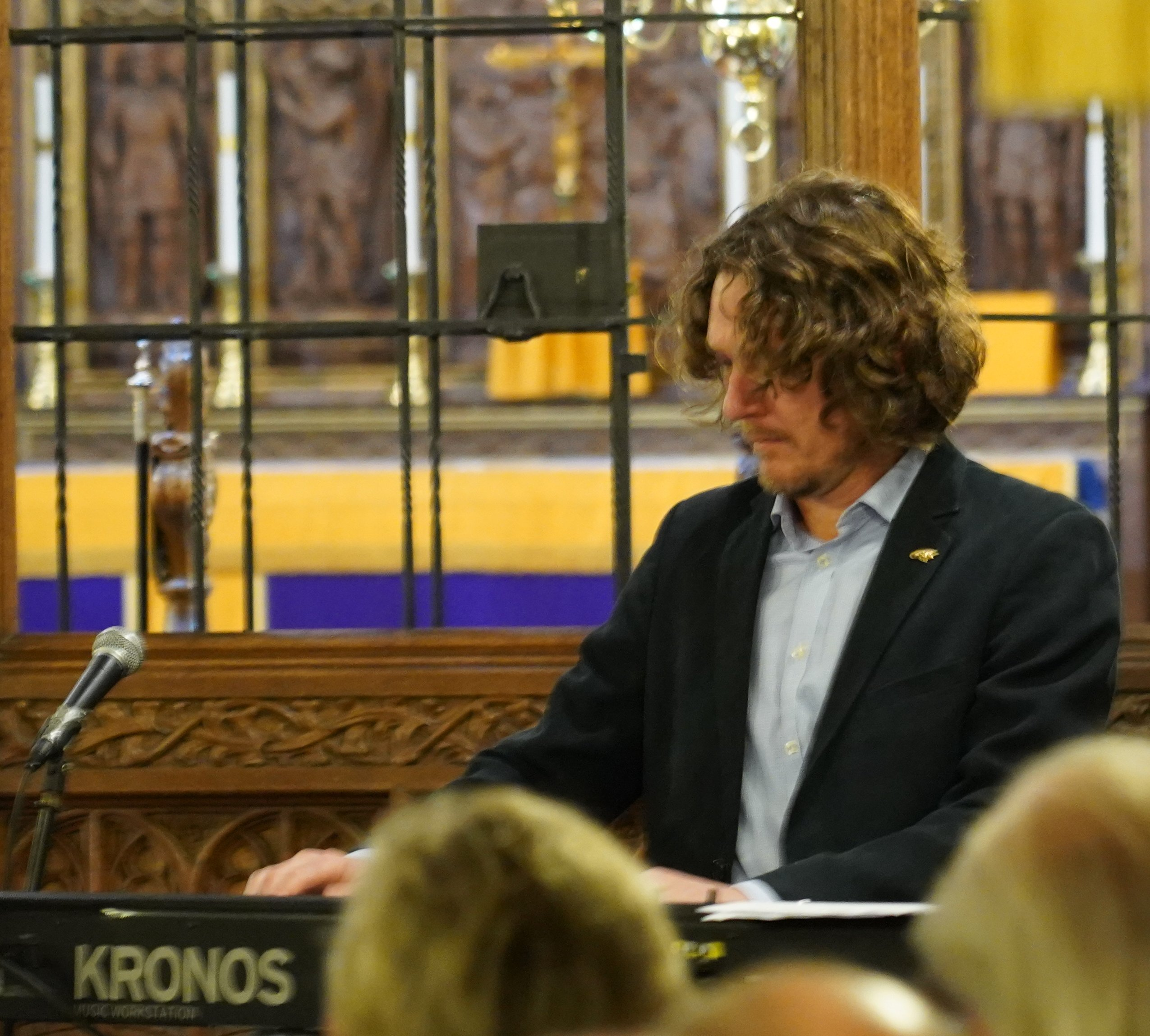
Wakeman performing in 2024

=== Solo ===
- 1993: Soliloquy
- 1994: 100 Years Overtime
- 1997: Real World Trilogy
- 2003: Neurasthenia
- 2021: A Handful of Memories

=== Wakeman with Wakeman ===
- 1992: Wakeman With Wakeman – AKA Lure of the Wild
- 1993: No Expense Spared
- 1994: The Official Bootleg
- 1994: Wakeman with Wakeman Live

=== Rick Wakeman and Adam Wakeman ===
- 1994: Romance of the Victorian Age
- 1996: Vignettes
- 1996: Tapestries

=== Damian Wilson and Adam Wakeman ===
- Weir Keeper's Tale (2016)
- The Sun Will Dance In Its Twilight Hour (2018)
- Stripped (2019)
- Can We Leave The Light On Longer? (2024)

=== Jazz Sabbath ===
- Jazz Sabbath (2020, as Milton Keanes)
- Jazz Sabbath Vol. 2 (2022, as Milton Keanes)
- Jazz Sabbath The 1968 Tapes (2024, as Milton Keanes)

=== Collaborations ===
- 1994: Light Up The Sky – Rick Wakeman
- 2001: The Revealing Songs of Yes – Various Artists
- 2001: Out of the Blue – Rick Wakeman and the English Rock Ensemble
- 2005: Live at the Orange – Jeronimo Road
- 2009: The Six Wives of Henry VIII Live at Hampton Court Palace – Rick Wakeman
- 2010: Scream – Ozzy Osbourne
- 2012: I Am Anonymous – Headspace
- 2013: Snakecharmer – Snakecharmer
- 2016: The End - Black Sabbath - keyboards (tracks 5–8)
- 2016: All That You Fear Is Gone – Headspace
- 2017: Second Skin – Snakecharmer
- 2017: The End: Live in Birmingham – Black Sabbath
- 2023: Live at the London Palladium 2023 – Rick Wakeman and the English Rock Ensemble
