= Heaven and Hell (Black Sabbath album) =

Studio album by Black Sabbath
- Released: 18 April 1980
- Recorded: 1979–1980
- Studios: Criteria, Miami; Ferber, Paris
- Genre: Heavy metal
- Length: 39:46
- Label: Vertigo
- Producer: Martin Birch

Black Sabbath chronology
Never Say Die! (1978)	Heaven and Hell (1980)	Live at Last (1980)

Singles from Heaven and Hell
- 1. "Neon Knights" Released: June 1980; 2. "Lady Evil" Released: 1980 (US); 3. "Die Young" Released: November 1980

Heaven and Hell is the ninth studio album by the English heavy metal band Black Sabbath, released on 18 April 1980. It is the first Black Sabbath album to feature vocalist Ronnie James Dio, who replaced original vocalist Ozzy Osbourne in 1979.

Produced by Martin Birch, the album was a commercial success, particularly in the United States, where it reached number 28 on the Billboard 200 chart and was certified platinum for one million sales. In the UK, it sold well enough to be certified silver by the British Phonographic Industry in April 1982.

== Overview ==
The initial sessions for what became Heaven and Hell began with Ozzy Osbourne following the conclusion of Black Sabbath's Never Say Die! Tour. The band convened in Los Angeles for 11 months to record a new album, a process described by guitarist Tony Iommi as a "highly frustrating, never-ending process". Osbourne has stated that he had become fed up with the experimentation on the preceding albums Technical Ecstasy and Never Say Die!, preferring the band's earlier, heavier sound. In his memoir, Iommi revealed that he still possesses a recording featuring Osbourne singing an early version of what would become "Children of the Sea" with different lyrics and "a totally different" vocal melody.

Ronnie James Dio was introduced to Iommi in 1979 by Sharon Arden, who would later marry Osbourne. Initially, Dio and Iommi discussed forming a new band, rather than a continuation of Black Sabbath. The pair met again by chance at The Rainbow on Sunset in Los Angeles later that year. Both men were in similar situations: Dio was seeking a new project and Iommi required a vocalist. "It must have been fate," Dio recalled, "because we connected so instantly." The pair kept in touch via telephone until Dio arrived at Iommi's Los Angeles house for a relaxed, getting-to-know-you jam session. On that first day, the duo finished "Children of the Sea", a song Iommi had abandoned prior to Osbourne's firing.

"Sabbath was a band that was floundering," Dio observed. "And, with my inclusion in it, we pulled ourselves up by our bootstraps, cared a lot about each other, and knew that we could do it again – especially under the banner of a band that had been so successful."

Sabbath's line-up was in a state of chaos as the band prepared to enter the studio to record what would become Heaven and Hell. Not only had the band replaced its longtime vocalist, but drummer Bill Ward was battling personal issues that would see him also leave the band within months. Demo recordings for the album, including song titles like "Lady Evil Blues", "Slap Back", "Lord She's Handsome" and an early version of the title track featured Geoff Nicholls on bass, as longtime bassist Geezer Butler was going through a divorce and his future with the band was in question. When Dio first joined the band, he doubled for a short time as bassist and vocalist, having played bass in the band Elf in the early 1970s. At one point Iommi contacted close friend Frank Zappa for help finding a bassist. Zappa offered his bassist for the Heaven and Hell sessions but Iommi preferred a permanent member. Eventually, Butler returned to the band and Nicholls stayed on as the band's unofficial keyboardist.

Former Elf and Rainbow bassist Craig Gruber also rehearsed with the band, though the extent of his involvement is unclear. In a 1996 interview, Iommi stated that Gruber participated only "for a bit". Gruber has stated that his contribution was quite substantial; he says he cowrote most of Heaven and Hell's songs and that it was he and not Butler who played bass on the album. Despite not being credited for his contributions, Gruber says he and the band nonetheless reached "a suitable financial arrangement". Iommi conceded in his 2011 autobiography that Gruber had indeed recorded all the bass parts on Heaven and Hell, but Butler had re-recorded them upon his return, without listening to Gruber's bass tracks. Gruber later stated in an interview in 2009 that he only helped write "Die Young".

Personal issues aside, drummer Bill Ward was not completely happy with the direction Black Sabbath was moving in creatively. "Heaven and Hell for me wasn't a turning point," he recalled. "Heaven and Hell was the beginning of a new band of which I had no idea what band I was in. It was almost like Ron was capable of coming up with lyrics that seemed to fit his idea of how Black Sabbath ought to be, and I sensed a kind of unrealness about the lyrics. My favourite song on Heaven and Hell was a blues song that we did, 'Lonely Is the Word' – and that seemed to be real. But things like 'Lady Evil', they seemed almost like bandwagon-type lyrics. 'Lonely Is the Word', I definitely liked playing that song. And 'Children of the Sea' – I did like to play that too. I thought Ronnie was a very good singer."

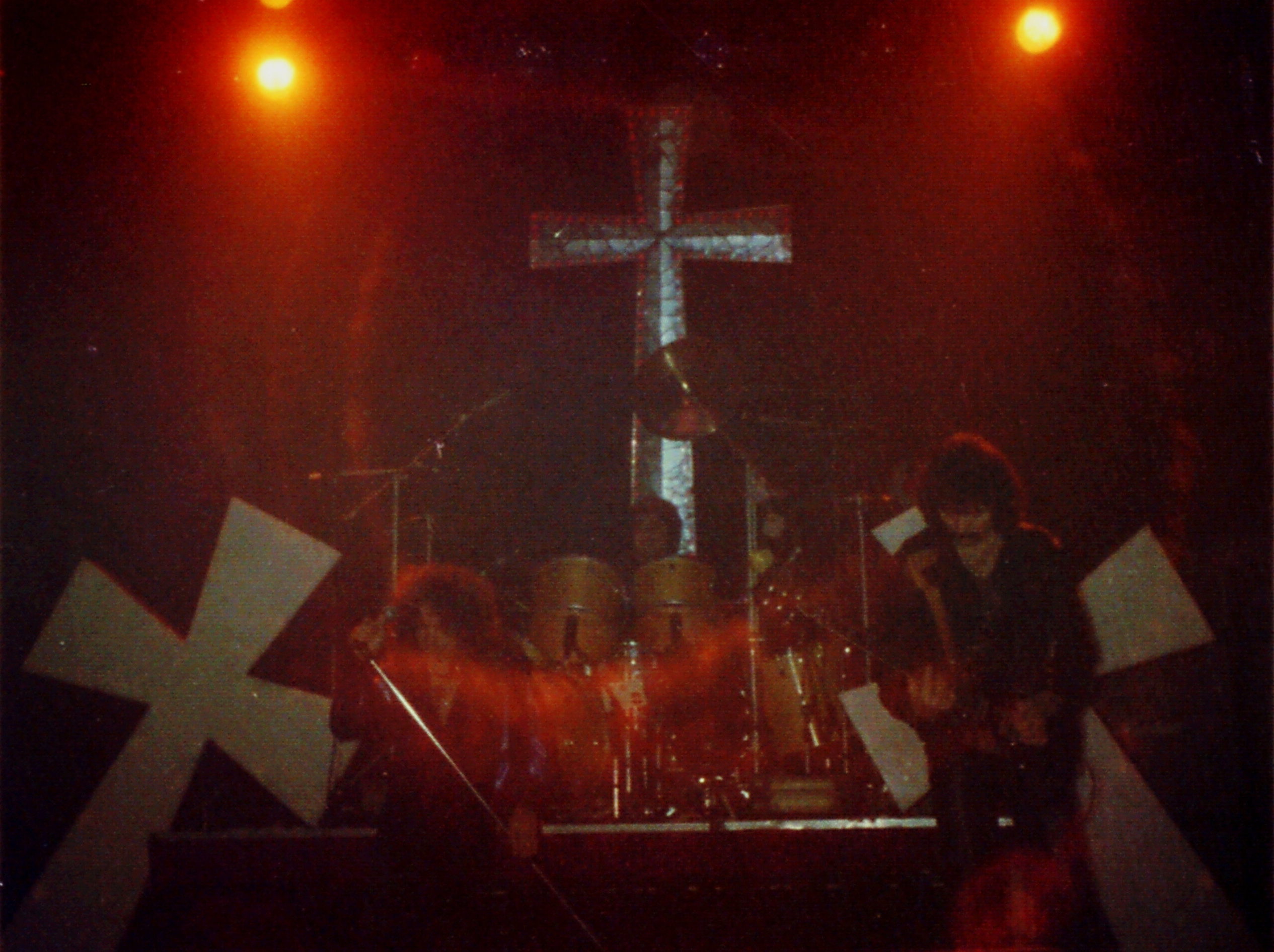
Black Sabbath performing in Cardiff in 1981

Heaven and Hell was recorded at Miami's Criteria Studios (in which the band recorded Technical Ecstasy) and Studios Ferber in Paris. Dio suggested the band hire producer Martin Birch, whom he had worked with as a member of Rainbow in the 1970s. Birch was Sabbath's first outside producer since the band parted ways with Rodger Bain following 1971's Master of Reality, with Iommi primarily producing the band's albums since that point by himself. Iommi stated that the band felt that they were creating something special in Heaven and Hell. In his memoir, he wrote, "Ozzy would sing with the riff. Just listen to 'Iron Man' and you'll catch my drift: his vocal melody line copies the melody of the music. There was nothing wrong with that, but Ronnie liked singing across the riff instead of with it, come up with a melody that was different from that of the music, which musically opens a lot more doors. I don't want to sound like I'm knocking Ozzy, but Ronnie's approach opened up a new way for me to think."

Black Sabbath had a long history of playing pranks on drummer Ward, and this continued during the recording of Heaven and Hell. During a slow day in the studio, Iommi doused Ward with a solution used by studio technicians to clean the tape heads, and he then set light to the solution, which was much more flammable than he had anticipated. Ward suffered third degree burns as a result and still has scars on his legs from the incident. Ward has stated that, due to his alcoholism, he has no memory at all of the period in which the album was recorded. His behaviour became erratic; on the Heaven & Hell Tour, Ward began dictating long and rambling press releases to the band's public relations representatives after every show, instructing them to "get that out on the news wires tonight". Ward's personal issues, which included the deaths of both his parents, would soon force him to leave the band. Dio recalled answering the telephone in his hotel room one morning mid-tour to hear Ward say "I'm off then, Ron", to which Dio replied "That's nice Bill, where are you going?" "No, I'm off mate. I'm at the airport now", indicating that he was incapable of completing the tour. American drummer Vinny Appice was quickly brought in to replace him. The Heaven and Hell album represents the only Sabbath material recorded during the Dio era that does not feature Appice on drums.

== Artwork ==
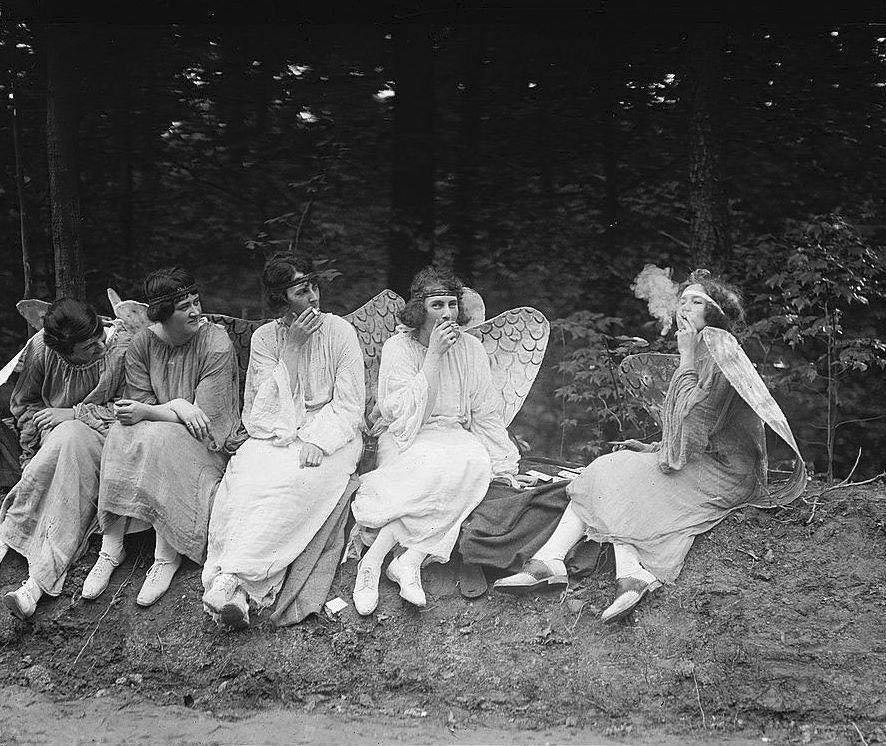
(Left): a 1928 photograph of women dressed as angels smoking backstage during a college Christmas pageant served as inspiration for the cover art; (right): back cover artwork by Harry Carmean

The album's cover art was taken from a painting by artist Lynn Curlee, Smoking Angels, inspired by a 1928 photograph of women dressed as angels smoking backstage during a break at a college pageant. The album's back cover illustration of the band was drawn by artist Harry Carmean.

== Reception ==
Professional ratings
Review scores
Source	Rating
AllMusic	4.5/5 stars
Blabbermouth.net	8/10
Collector's Guide to Heavy Metal	10/10
Drowned in Sound	8/10
The Great Rock Discography	7/10
Kerrang!	5/5 stars
MusicHound	3.5/5
Record Mirror	3.5/5 stars
The Rolling Stone Album Guide	4/5 stars
Sputnikmusic	5/5

The album was successful, becoming the band's highest-charting album (No. 9 UK, No. 28 US) since 1975's Sabotage and the third highest-selling album of Black Sabbath behind Paranoid and Master of Reality, respectively. It was eventually certified platinum in 1986 for selling 1 million copies in the United States. In the UK, it became the third Black Sabbath studio album to attain silver certification (60,000 units sold) by the British Phonographic Industry, achieving this in November 1980. It subsequently attained gold certification (100,000 units sold) in April 1982, the only Black Sabbath studio album to be thus certified. Heaven and Hell was re-released as part of the Black Sabbath box set The Rules of Hell in 2008. In 2017, it was ranked 37th at Rolling Stone's "100 Greatest Metal Albums of All Time".

Six of the album's tracks were played live, with only "Walk Away" and "Wishing Well" not making the setlists on the Heaven & Hell Tour. Four of those became mainstays in setlists for the band's tours with Dio and Tony Martin: "Children of the Sea", "Neon Knights", "Die Young" and the title track.

Some critics insisted that Dio's addition irretrievably altered the band, with Rolling Stone contending, "Although Dio could belt with the best of them, Sabbath would never be the same." In his autobiography, Iommi admits, "We were doing big shows and it was difficult for Ronnie to go out and stand in front of people who had seen Ozzy in that spot for ten years. Some of the kids hated it and they'd shout: 'Ozzy, Ozzy!' But eventually Ronnie won them over."

In an interview with Songfacts, Osbourne guitarist Zakk Wylde of Black Label Society dismissed the idea of the Dio-era being authentic Sabbath: "You listen to Black Sabbath with Ronnie James Dio in it, and it's not Black Sabbath. They should have just called it Heaven & Hell right from the beginning. Because you listen to that Heaven and Hell album, that doesn't sound anything close to Black Sabbath. I mean, that sounds about as much like Black Sabbath as Blizzard of Ozz sounds like Black Sabbath. If you were to play Black Sabbath for me – and I'm a huge Sabbath freako – and then with Father Dio over there, I'd be going, 'Oh, cool, what band is this? This is good stuff.' I mean, the songs don't even sound Black Sabbath-y. I mean, 'Neon Knights', could you picture Ozzy singing over that song?"

Mick Wall noted in his book Black Sabbath: Symptom of the Universe, "For once their timing was spot on. In Britain, Sounds magazine had begun championing a new musical phenomenon it dubbed 'The New Wave of British Heavy Metal' ... The reborn Black Sabbath, with their glistening new sound, incomparable new singer and top-drawer new album, were seen as part of a widespread revival in rock fandom."

In a retrospective overview of the band’s releases through their career, The Guardian assesses that “(t)he opener, “Neon Knights”, served notice that Black Sabbath – with Dio replacing Osbourne – were revitalised. It wasn’t the only track on which the group sounded rejuvenated by the emergent new wave of British of heavy metal…The title track still had the Sabbath plod, yet they somehow sounded nimble with it. They were leading again, not following.”

== Track listing ==
=== Standard Edition ===
All lyrics are written by Ronnie James Dio; all music is composed by Geezer Butler, Ronnie James Dio, Tony Iommi, and Bill Ward.

Side A
No.	Title	Length
1.	"Neon Knights"	3:53
2.	"Children of the Sea"	5:34
3.	"Lady Evil"	4:26
4.	"Heaven and Hell"	7:00

Side B
No.	Title	Length
5.	"Wishing Well"	4:07
6.	"Die Young"	4:45
7.	"Walk Away"	4:25
8.	"Lonely Is the Word"	5:51
Total length:		39:46

=== 2010 Deluxe Edition ===
Disc one
No.	Title	Length

Disc two
No.	Title	Original release	Length
1.	"Children of the Sea" (Live)	"Neon Knights" live B-side	6:24
2.	"Heaven and Hell" (Live)	"Die Young" live B-side	7:19
3.	"Lady Evil" (Mono 7" Edit)	"Lady Evil" 7" Mono Single	3:54
4.	"Neon Knights" (Live)	Live, Hartford, CT, 1980	4:49
5.	"Children of the Sea" (Live)	Live, Hartford, CT, 1980	5:58
6.	"Heaven and Hell" (Live)	Live, Hartford, CT, 1980 & 12" single version	12:34
7.	"Die Young" (Live)	Live, Hartford, CT, 1980	4:36
Total length:			45:24

=== 2021 Deluxe Edition ===
Disc one: Original Album (2021 Remaster)
No.	Title	Length
1.	"Neon Knights"	3:51
2.	"Children of the Sea"	5:33
3.	"Lady Evil"	4:24
4.	"Heaven and Hell"	6:57
5.	"Wishing Well"	4:06
6.	"Die Young"	4:43
7.	"Walk Away"	4:24
8.	"Lonely Is the Word"	5:48

Disc two: Bonus Tracks
No.	Title	Length
1.	"Children of the Sea (Live)" (Live B-Side of "Neon Knights")	6:25
2.	"Heaven and Hell (Live)" (Live B-Side of "Die Young")	7:18
3.	"Lady Evil (Mono 7" Edit)"	3:56

Live at Hartford Civic Center, Hartford, CT, U.S.A., August 10, 1980
No.	Title	Length
4.	"Neon Knights"	5:11
5.	"Children of the Sea"	5:52
6.	"Heaven and Hell"	12:19
7.	"Die Young"	4:36

Live at Hammersmith Odeon, London, U.K., December 31, 1981 - January 2, 1982
No.	Title	Length
8.	"E5150"	1:16
9.	"Neon Knights"	4:36
10.	"Children of the Sea"	6:00
11.	"Heaven and Hell"	14:30

== Personnel ==
Black Sabbath

- Ronnie James Dio – vocals
- Tony Iommi – guitars
- Geezer Butler – bass
- Bill Ward – drums

Additional personnel

- Geoff Nicholls – keyboards

Production

- produced and engineered by Martin Birch
- assistant engineer – Joe "C" Foglia
- equipment: Graham Wright and Mickey Balla
- Remastered by Gert Van Hoeyen (1987 reissue)
- remastered by Ray Staff (1996 reissue)
- remastered by Dan Hersch (2008 reissue)
- remastered by Andy Pearce (2010 reissue)
- album cover art Smoking Angels by Lynn Curlee
- Back cover illustration by Harry Carmean
- art direction by Richard Seireeni

== Release history ==
Region	Date	Label
United Kingdom	1980	Vertigo Records
United States	1980	Warner Bros. Records
United Kingdom	1996	Castle Communications
United Kingdom	2004	Sanctuary Records
United States	2008	Rhino Records
United States	2021	Rhino Records

== Charts ==
Chart (1980–1981)	Peak position
Canada Top Albums/CDs (RPM)	23
German Albums (Offizielle Top 100)	37
Japanese Albums (Oricon)	60
New Zealand Albums (RMNZ)	44
Norwegian Albums (VG-lista)	22
Swedish Albums (Sverigetopplistan)	25
UK Albums (Official Charts)	9
US Billboard 200	28

Chart (2020)	Peak position
Polish Albums (ZPAV)	47

Chart (2021–2025)	Peak position
Finnish Albums (Suomen virallinen lista)	39
Greek Albums (IFPI)	39
Scottish Albums (Official Charts)	48
UK Independent Albums (Official Charts)	20
UK Rock & Metal Albums (Official Charts)	8

== Certifications ==
Region	Certification	Certified units/sales
Canada (Music Canada)	Gold	50,000^{^}
United Kingdom (BPI)	Gold	100,000^{^}
United States (RIAA)	Platinum	1,000,000^{^}
^{^} Shipments figures based on certification alone.

== Notable covers ==
- In 2010, Machine Head mainman, Robb Flynn, released audio and video of an acoustic cover of "Die Young" as a tribute to his former manager, Debbie Abono, who had died on the same day as Ronnie James Dio.
- Warrior recorded "Neon Knights" for the 2010 Neon Knights – A Tribute to Black Sabbath album.
- The 2014 Ronnie James Dio – This Is Your Life tribute, overseen by Ronnie James Dio's long-time manager, Wendy Dio, included a cover of "Neon Knights" by Anthrax. Stryper's version of "Heaven and Hell" was a bonus track on the Japanese edition.

== See also ==
- Heaven & Hell Tour
