= Children of the Sea (song) =

Song by Black Sabbath

from the album Heaven and Hell
- Released: 18 April 1980
- Recorded: October 1979 at Criteria Recording Studios in Miami, Florida
- Genre: Heavy metal
- Length: 5:34
- Label: Vertigo
- Composers: Geezer Butler, Ronnie James Dio, Tony Iommi, Bill Ward
- Lyricist: Ronnie James Dio
- Producer: Martin Birch

"Children of the Sea" is a song by English heavy metal band Black Sabbath, from their ninth studio album, Heaven and Hell (1980).

== Overview ==
"Children of the Sea" was the first song written by the band following the 1979 departure of original lead singer Ozzy Osbourne. The song's melody and lyrics were composed by new singer, Ronnie James Dio, and the music was written largely by guitarist Tony Iommi.

After first meeting Iommi in 1979, Dio arrived at the guitarist's Los Angeles house for a jam session, and on that occasion the duo wrote the song. "Tony had this great riff he played me but nothing to go with it," recalled Dio. "I said, 'Gimme a minute' and went into the corner and started writing down the words." Iommi recalled the moment as a turning point in Black Sabbath's career, saying "It was exciting and challenging because we were doing things that quite frankly would have been beyond us with Ozzy. He wasn't that sort of singer." Iommi claims to still possess a very early demo recording of the song with Osbourne on vocals, though with a different melody and lyrics.

Once Dio had joined the band, a new demo recording of the song was produced featuring Geoff Nicholls on bass. The band's longtime bassist, Geezer Butler, was going through a divorce and wasn't able to commit to the band. "In the end though, Geezer sorted himself out and Geoff stayed with us to play keyboards", said Iommi.

The song was recorded live at Deeside Leisure Centre on 20 May 1980 and appears as the B-side of the single "Neon Knights".

"Children of the Sea" was ranked the 18th best Black Sabbath song by Rock - Das Gesamtwerk der größten Rock-Acts im Check.

== Covers ==
- List of cover versions of Black Sabbath songs.

== Personnel ==
Black Sabbath

- Ronnie James Dio – vocals
- Tony Iommi – guitar
- Geezer Butler – bass
- Bill Ward – drums

Additional musician

- Geoff Nicholls – keyboards
