= Jazz Sabbath =

Jazz band

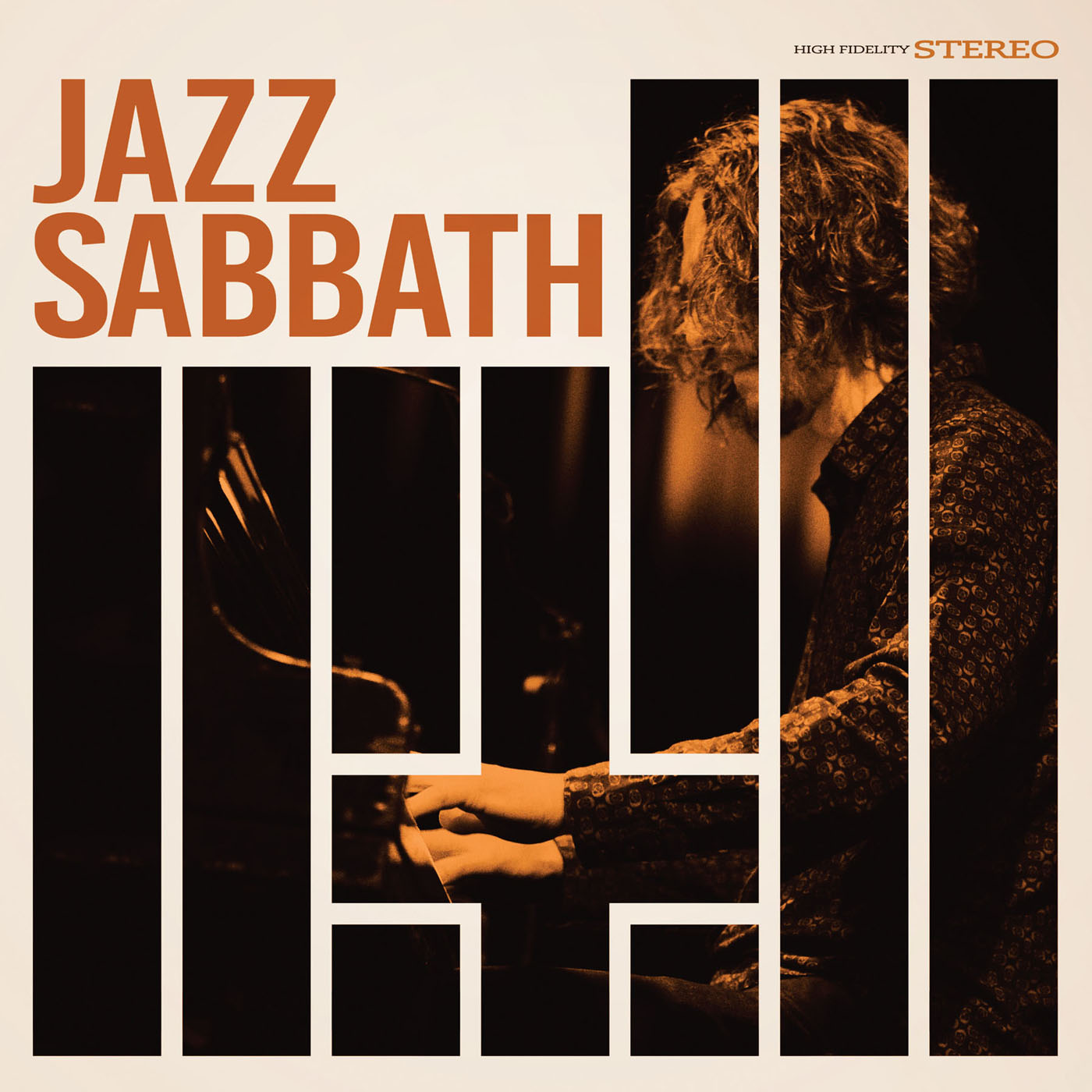

Background information
- Origin: United Kingdom
- Genres: Jazz, jazz fusion
- Years active: 2020–present
- Label: Blacklake
- Members: Adam Wakeman; Jack Tustin; Arthur Newell

Jazz Sabbath is an English jazz trio, with a fictional backstory that they are from the late sixties. The band was created by Adam Wakeman, touring keyboard and guitar player for Black Sabbath (2004–2017, 2025) and Ozzy Osbourne band member (2004–2025). Jazz Sabbath plays jazz renditions of Black Sabbath songs, claiming to be the original writers of those songs and accusing Black Sabbath of plagiarism.

The band first appeared in a mockumentary on YouTube in February 2020. In this short film band leader Milton Keanes (Adam Wakeman) was interviewed by actor Robert Powell about the early days of Jazz Sabbath, their cancelled debut album and the alleged theft of their songs by Black Sabbath. This album was later released as an actual album on 10 April 2020.

== History ==
The idea for Jazz Sabbath started in 2013 on a night off in Berlin during one of the Black Sabbath tours, when Adam and Sabbath's security guard sat at the hotel bar early in the morning. The security guard asked if Adam could play the Sabbath set on the piano in the bar. Adam thought it would be fun to play the songs as jazz improvised versions and then played until the bar staff wanted to go home.

== Discography ==
Jazz Sabbath (2020)
Released through Blacklake Records on 10 April 2020, the album contains jazz renditions of "Fairies Wear Boots", "Evil Woman", "Rat Salad", "Iron Man", "Hand of Doom", "Changes" and "Children of the Grave".

On the iTunes jazz chart, the album debuted at #4 in the UK, #3 in the US and #1 in Canada. The album peaked at #14 on the Official Jazz & Blues Albums Chart Top 30 and at #25 on the Billboard Jazz Albums Chart.

A mono edition of the album was released only in record stores on Record Store Day Black Friday, 27 November 2020. This RSD edition is pressed on blue transparent vinyl and includes the bonus track "Iron Man (Live in London 1968)" plus a bonus DVD with the Jazz Sabbath documentary. The live bonus track was later released on digital/streaming platforms on International Jazz Day, 30 April 2021.

Jazz Sabbath Vol. 2 (2022)
Jazz Sabbath Vol. 2 was released on 22 April 2022. The album contains jazz renditions of "Paranoid", "Snowblind", "Behind the Wall of Sleep", "Sabbra Cadabra", "Symptom of the Universe", "N.I.B." and "Black Sabbath". The album entered the iTunes jazz chart at #1 in the UK, the US and Canada and at #6 on the Billboard Jazz Albums Chart.

A mono edition of Vol. 2 was released as part of Record Store Day on 23 April 2022. This edition was pressed on translucent natural vinyl and included the bonus track "Orchid" and a bonus DVD.

The 1968 Tapes (2024)
Jazz Sabbath released their third album The 1968 Tapes on 29 November 2024. The album contains jazz renditions of "Into the Void", "Spiral Architect", "Warning", "The Wizard", "Electric Funeral", "Supernaut" and "War Pigs".

A mono edition of The 1968 Tapes was released as part of Record Store Day Black Friday on the same day. This edition was pressed on Coke Bottle Clear vinyl in the United States and white vinyl in the United Kingdom and included the bonus track "Hole in the Sky" and a bonus CD. Both variants also had an alternative album cover.

Jazz Sabbath Live (2026)
A live album was released on 20 February 2026. The double album features 11 live tracks and was recorded at the Paradox Jazz Club in Tilburg, The Netherlands, during Jazz Sabbath's 2025 European tour.

Tracklist: “Black Sabbath”, “The Wizard”, “War Pigs”, “Behind the Wall of Sleep”, “Iron Man”, “Fairies Wear Boots”, “Hole in the Sky”, “Paranoid”, “Into the Void”, “Rat Salad”, “Children of the Grave”.

An early edition was released on colored vinyl with alternate artwork as part of Record Store Day Black Friday in the United States and Canada on 28 November 2025.

== Members ==
In the album liner notes, the band members and session players are only mentioned by their fictional names:

=== Studio albums ===
- Adam Wakeman (as Milton Keanes) – piano, Rhodes, Moog (as Leighton B'zard) Hammond organ, clavinet, (as Allen Kees) Fender Rhodes, (as Francis Mellie) percussion
- Ash Soan (as Juan Také) – drums
- Jerry Meehan (as Jacque T'fono) – upright bass albums 1 & 2
- Jack Tustin (as Jacque T'fono) – upright bass albums 3

Album session players:

- Pete Rinaldi (as Wes Tostrayer) – guitar,
- Simon McBride (as Steven Stringer) – guitar
- Fraser T. Smith (as Chester Drawes) – guitar
- Justin Swadling (as Fenton Breezley) – saxophone, clarinet, (as Loquacious Fellaish) horn arrangements
- Jon Spanyol (as Lester Trumpton) – trombone, euphonium
- Joe Rodwell (as Elton Spanks-William) – trumpet
- Gus G (as Angus Guitaropoulos) – guitar
- Richard Barrett (as Arthur Itis and Al Dentay) – guitar
- Rupert Fenn (as Newton Abbot) – guitar
- Andrew Ross (as Hugh Jampton) – tenor saxophone
- George Hogg (as Willy Makit) – trumpet

=== Live band ===
- Adam Wakeman – piano, keyboards (2022 - now)
- Jack Tustin – upright bass (2022 - now)
- Jonny Wickham – upright bass (2023 - now)
- Dylan Howe – drums (2022)
- Arthur Newell – drums (2023 - now)

Tour guests:

- Justin Swadling – saxophone
- Jon Spanyol – trombone
- Gus G – guitar
- Rick Wakeman – keyboards
- Billy Watman – guitar
- Tim Landers – upright bass
- Tal Bergman – drums
