= Neon Knights =

Song by Black Sabbath

Single by Black Sabbath

from the album Heaven and Hell
- B-side: "Children of the Sea (live)"
- Released: June 1980
- Recorded: January 1980 at Studio Ferber (Paris, France)
- Genre: Heavy metal
- Length: 3:49
- Label: Vertigo
- Composers: Geezer Butler, Ronnie James Dio, Tony Iommi, Bill Ward
- Lyricist: Ronnie James Dio
- Producer: Martin Birch

Black Sabbath singles chronology
"Hard Road" (1978)	"Neon Knights" (1980)	"Die Young" (1980)

Audio sample
- file; help

"Neon Knights" is a song by the English heavy metal band Black Sabbath from 1980's Heaven and Hell, their first album with American vocalist Ronnie James Dio.

== Overview ==
"Neon Knights" was the last song written by the band for the Heaven and Hell album. It was quickly written and recorded at Studio Ferber in Paris during January 1980 simply to fill time on the album's first side. The lyrics were written by Ronnie James Dio. It is the only song on Heaven and Hell to definitely feature songwriting input from bassist Geezer Butler, the band's main lyricist during the Ozzy Osbourne era. Butler was absent for most of the songwriting process due personal issues as well as his own uncertainty as to whether he wanted to remain in the band. Dio occasionally performed the song during their live shows in later years.

The B-side of the 1980 single release features a live version of "Children of the Sea" from an unspecified date. The song reached number 22 on the UK charts, but failed to chart anywhere else.

In the UK, the first 25,000 copies had a picture-bag.

== Track listing ==
7" single

1. "Neon Knights" – 3:49
2. "Children of the Sea" (live) – 6:30

== Personnel ==
- Tony Iommi – guitars
- Bill Ward – drums
- Geezer Butler – bass
- Ronnie James Dio – vocals
- Geoff Nicholls – keyboards

== Chart positions ==
Chart (1980)	Position
UK Singles Chart	22

== Covers ==
"Neon Knights" (Steel Prophet cover)
Sample of "Neon Knights" as covered by Steel Prophet.

- Iron Savior covered the song on their 1999 album Unification.
- Steel Prophet covered the song on their 2000 album Genesis.
- Turbo covered the song on their 2001 album Awatar.
- Westworld covered the song on their 2002 album Cyberdreams.
- Queensrÿche covered the song on their 2007 album Take Cover.
- Sapattivuosi covered the song on their 2009 album Ihmisen merkki.
- Warrior covered the song in 2010 for the tribute album Neon Knights – A Tribute to Black Sabbath.
- Anthrax covered the song during live performances in tribute to Dio following his death in 2010. In 2014, the band recorded a studio version for the tribute album Ronnie James Dio – This Is Your Life.
