= Rondellus (ensemble) =

Estonian musical ensemble

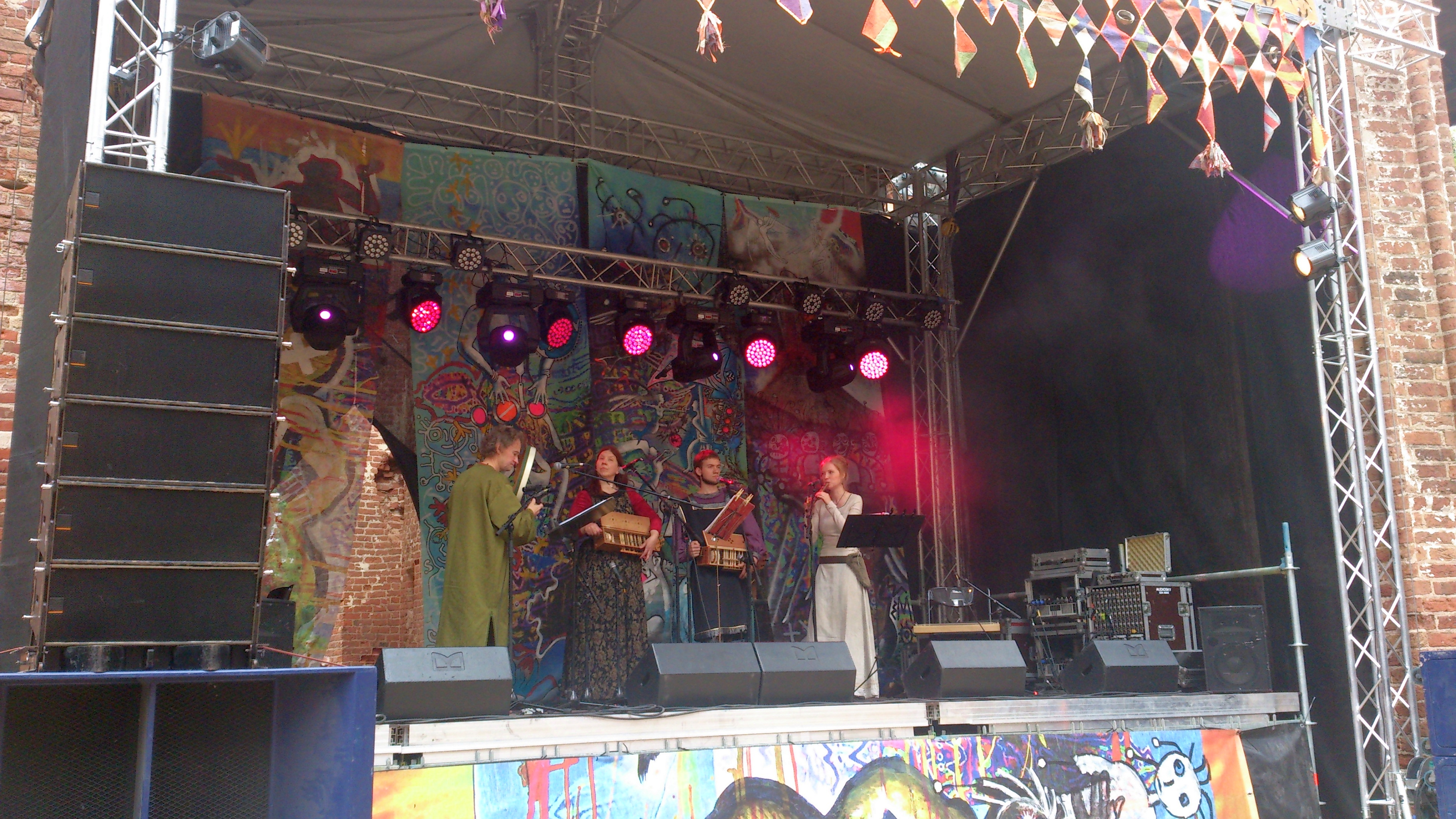
Rondellus on the Hanseatic Days of Tartu 2014, in Tartu Cathedral

Rondellus is an Estonian musical ensemble. After recording several albums of early music on period instruments they recorded Sabbatum: Medieval Tribute to Black Sabbath in the same style having translated the vocals to Latin. ("War Pigs" = "Verres Militares") Instrumentation: vocals, hurdy-gurdy, organistrum, lute, percussion, fiddle, and harp.

Though the American Classical League claims, "Metal fans will undoubtedly appreciate Sabbatum," AllMusic claims, "Black Sabbath fans are unlikely to dig music as extremely mellow as this, though the album could serve as okay background music for yoga or a massage."

Albums:

- Rondellus. Secular Music in France from the XIVth-XVth Century (1995)
- Sanctum Rosarium (1995)
- Carmina Sanctorum (1998)
- Sabbatum (2003)
- Adoratur rosa (2009)
