= Dominion (Benedictum album) =

Studio album by Benedictum
- Released: March 8, 2011
- Genre: Heavy metal
- Length: 71:15
- Label: Frontiers Records
- Producer: Ryan Greene

Benedictum chronology
Seasons of Tragedy (2008)	Dominion (2011)	Obey (2013)

Dominion is the third studio album by the American heavy metal band Benedictum, released through Frontiers Records in 2011.

AllMusic stated in its review of the album, "With only Freeman's delivery as a point of interest, and the songwriting, playing, and awkward themes lacking bite and artistry, Dominion is a mostly amateurish, juvenile affair."

== Track listing ==
Dominion track listing
No.	Title	Length
1.	"Dominion"	4:18
2.	"At the Gates"	3:59
3.	"Seer"	4:34
4.	"Grind It"	2:44
5.	"Prodigal Son"	4:55
6.	"The Shadowlands"	4:56
7.	"Beautiful Pain"	1:29
8.	"Dark Heart"	4:00
9.	"Bang"	4:30
10.	"Loud Silence"	5:07
11.	"Epsilon"	8:54
12.	"Sanctuary" (bonus track)	5:07
13.	"Overture/Temples of Syrinx" (bonus track)	8:21
Total length:		68:55

== Personnel ==
- Veronica Freeman – vocals
- Pete Wells – guitar
- Chris Shrum – bass
- Tony Diaz – keyboards
- Mikey Pannone – drums
