= Seasons of Tragedy =

Studio album by Benedictum
- Released: January 11, 2008
- Recorded: 2007
- Genre: Heavy metal
- Length: 59:03
- Label: Locomotive Music
- Producer: Jeff Pilson

Benedictum chronology
Uncreation (2006)	Seasons of Tragedy (2008)	Dominion (2011)

Seasons of Tragedy is the second studio album by the American heavy metal band Benedictum, released through Locomotive Records in 2008.

It was given a 7.5 out of 10 by Blabbermouth.net.

== Track listing ==
- All songs written by Veronica Freeman, Pete Wells, Jesse Wright & Paul Courtois, except where noted.
1. "Dawn of Seasons" (Instrumental) – 1:26
2. "Shell Shock" – 4:25
3. "Burn It Out" – 3:32
4. "Bare Bones" – 5:11
5. "Within the Solace" – 4:21
6. "Beast in the Field" – 6:37
7. "Legacy" – 5:35
8. "Nobodies Victim" – 4:44
9. "Balls to the Wall" (Accept cover; written by Udo Dirkschneider, Wolf Hoffmann, Hermann Frank, Peter Baltes & Stefan Kaufmann) – 5:44
10. "Steel Rain" – 5:46
11. "Seasons of Tragedy" – 11:37
12. "Catch the Rainbow" (Rainbow cover and bonus track; written by Ronnie James Dio & Ritchie Blackmore) - 6:34

== Personnel ==
=== Benedictum ===
- Veronica Freeman – vocals
- Pete Wells – rhythm & lead guitar
- Jesse Wright – bass
- Paul Courtois – drums, percussion

=== Additional musicians ===
- George Lynch, Craig Goldy, Manni Schmidt: Additional Lead Guitars
- Chris Morgan: Keyboards, Piano, Synthesizers, Synthesized Strings

== Production ==
- Arranged by Benedictum
- Produced by Jeff Pilson
- Recorded & Mixed by Tommy Henriksen
- Mastered by Brad Vance
