= Benedictum =

American heavy metal band

- Also known as: Bound
- Origin: San Diego, California, U.S.
- Genres: Heavy metal, power metal
- Years active: 2005–present (on hold since 2014)
- Labels: Frontiers, Locomotive
- Members: Veronica Freeman; Pete Wells; Rikard Stjernquist; Aric Avina
- Past members: Blackie Sanchez; Jesse Wright; Chris Morgan; Paul Courtois; Chris Shrum; Tony Diaz; Mikey Pannone
- Website: benedictum.net

Benedictum is an American heavy metal band formed in 2005 in San Diego, California that now resides in Phoenix, Arizona. Their current lineup consists of vocalist Veronica Freeman, guitarist Pete Wells, bassist Aric Avina, and drummer Rikard Stjernquist. Since their formation the band released four studio albums, debuting with Uncreation in 2006, followed by Seasons of Tragedy in 2008, both through Spain-based label Locomotive Music, before signing with Italian label Frontiers Records for their third album, Dominion, issued in 2011. Their fourth and most recent album, Obey, was released on Frontiers Records in 2013.

== History ==
=== Band formation ===
Benedictum was formed as Bound by vocalist Veronica Freeman and guitarist Pete Wells in San Diego, California in 2005. The two founding members had been in the band known as Malady for over ten years. Freeman and Wells recruited drummer Blackie Sanchez and keyboardist Chris Morgan, whom Freeman had played with in the Dio tribute band Evilution. Freeman's acquaintance with Dio's guitarist Craig Goldy, brought the band to meet the former Dio and Dokken bass player Jeff Pilson, who produced their first three-track demo and contributed playing bass guitar. In late 2005, they signed a deal with Spanish label Locomotive Records.

=== History ===
After signing with Locomotive Records, Benedictum entered in the studio to record their debut album with production by Jeff Pilson and mixing by Pilson and former Warlock member Tommy Henriksen. The band recorded eleven songs including the covers of Black Sabbath′s songs "Heaven and Hell" and "The Mob Rules", songs the group members had played for years in tribute bands. Both the former Rainbow and Dio member Jimmy Bain and Craig Goldy played as guests on the album. Uncreation was due for release on October 17, 2005, but was delayed to January 20, 2006, according to vocalist Veronica Freeman,

While we were all really looking forward to having Uncreation in stores this year rather than next this move is actually better are all parties involved. This is our inaugural release, which makes it all the more important that things are set up properly. Pushing the album back to January gave us a chance to tweak a few things and is giving the staff at Locomotive more time to put everything in motion. As they say, everything happens for a reason, so it's all good.

Garnering strong reviews for Uncreation, including a "bands to watch in 2006" pick by British magazine Classic Rock, the band toured Europe for the first time in the summer of that year, starting at Italy's Gods of Metal festival near Milan. Benedictum also joined the Winter 2006 Doro European tour.

For their 2008 sophomore release, Seasons of Tragedy, the group continued working with producer Jeff Pilson, who brought in former Dokken bandmate George Lynch to contribute guitar solos on "Bare Bones" and a cover of the Accept track "Balls to the Wall". Long-time friend, guitarist Craig Goldy, also made an appearance on the album. The band supported the album in Europe with several festival shows and completed a fall tour with NWOBHM veterans Girlschool.

With regard to Seasons of Tragedy, Allmusic reviewer Stewart Mason stated that "Singer Veronica Freeman has a powerful, hectoring voice, similar at times to Grace Slick's potent bellow from the Jefferson Starship days, and keyboardist Chris Morgan prefers to add subtle coloration and powerful drone parts rather than lame Keith Emerson-style twiddling."

Prior to working on their third album, Dominion, the band underwent significant lineup changes with only core members Veronica Freeman and Pete Wells remaining. Benedictum left Locomotive Music and signed with Frontiers Records. Due to Jeff Pilson's commitments with Foreigner, Grammy Award winning engineer/producer Ryan Greene, whose credits include Megadeth and NOFX, produced the album. Pilson and Craig Goldy guested on the album. Bassist Rudy Sarzo played on the song "Bang". Continuing the tradition of covering at least one cover track on each album, the band cut "Overture" / "The Temples of Syrinx" / "Grand Finale" off of 2112 by Rush, which is featured as a bonus track.

New members Rikard Stjernquist (ex-Jag Panzer) on drums and Aric Avina on bass were recruited in 2012 to record their latest album Obey, released in November 2013.

The band toured to promote the album, including supporting Y&T in their 40th Anniversary Tour in 2014, though there is no known activity from the band since then.

== Members ==
=== Current members ===
- Veronica Freeman – vocals
- Pete Wells – guitar
- Aric Avina – bass
- Rikard Stjernquist – drums

=== Former members ===
- Blackie Sanchez – drums
- Jesse Wright – bass
- Chris Morgan – keyboards
- Paul Courtois – drums
- Chris Shrum – bass
- Tony Diaz – keyboards
- Mikey Pannone – drums

== Discography ==
Studio albums

- Uncreation (2006)
- Seasons of Tragedy (2008)
- Dominion (2011)
- Obey (2013)
