= Nürnberg (band) =

Belarusian post-punk band

- Origin: Minsk, Belarus
- Genres: Post-punk, cold wave
- Years active: 2016–present
- Labels: Sierpien, Young and Cold
- Members: Yury Luhautsou; Aleh Sautin
- Website: nurnberg.band

Nürnberg is a Belarusian post-punk band from Minsk. The band performs in Europe and other countries, including Latin America.

== History ==
The musicians consider 2016 to be the year the musical group was founded. The group's name was taken from the German city Nuremberg, noting its historical association with the Grand Duchy of Lithuania.

The members of the group are: Yury Luhautsou (Юрый Лугаўцоў) (vocals, bass-guitar) and Aleh Sautin (Алег Савуцін) (guitar). Outside of the band, Sautin works as a medical professional.

The band's first performances started with covers. They started actively touring in 2017. At the start of their careers the musicians played with renowned Belarusian groups such as Akute and Petlya Pristrastiya (Пятля Прыхільнасці, lit. 'Loop of Addiction'). And so, little by little, they established their position on the "wave of Belarusian dark music".

In 2018 the music portal TuzinFM named the group the discovery of the year.

They have played for the Waves Vienna Festival and Eurosonic.

== Musical style ==
The members of the group are inspired by the grey atmosphere and general boredom. According to the musicians they do not perform pure post-punk, but blend it with other styles.

The journal Post-Punk.com characterised the album "Adkaz" as more dynamic and significantly different to their previous work. The tracks reflect individual experiences during historical events. The album touches on themes of hostility and mental health issues that relate to modern Eastern European life, as well as understanding of love and personal relationships.

== Performances and albums ==
In 2020, the album "Paharda" was released, followed by the single "Kachannie" in 2021.

In 2020, the group planned a tour around Germany, including a visit to Nuremberg, but this was cancelled due to the pandemic. In 2023 the group was finally able to perform in the German city.

In 2023 the band released their third studio album "Adkaz".

In 2024, as part of a Latin American Tour Nürnberg performed at the Amon Solar club, in the historical centre of San José, Costa Rica. In the same year the group won the hearts of Colombians. There was also a tour of Mexico.

For their performances in Europe the group works with the booking agent Swamp Booking.

== Discography ==
Title	Type	Release Details
Demo	EP	2017 Death Shadow Records (Cassette) Young And Cold Records (Vinyls, CD)
U nikudy	EP	2018 Death Shadow Records (Cassette) Young And Cold Records (Vinyl, CD)
Skryvaj	Album	2018 Recorded by Roman Komogortsev (Раман Камагорцаў) Mixing & Mastering by Roman Komogortsev Death Shadow Records (Cassette) Squall Recordings (Cassette) Underground Disco Beočin (Cassette) Fleuret Records (Vinyl) Deadcity Records (Vinyl) Young And Cold Records (Vinyl, CD)
Mora	Single	2019 Recording by Roman Komogortsev Mixing & Mastering by Roman Komogortsev Album cover by Yury Luhautsou
Paharda	Album	2020 Recording by Roman Komogortsev Mixing & Mastering by Roman Komogortsev Album cover by Ansis Rožkalns Death Shadow Records (Vinyl) MINIMALKOMBINAT (CD) Young And Cold Records (Vinyl, CD)
Kachannie	Single	2021 Recording by Roman Komogortsev Mixing & Mastering by Roman Komogortsev Album cover by Elizaveta Chepaikina
Kaniec	Single	2022 Recording by Roman Komogortsev, Andrei Babrouka Mixing & Mastering by Roman Komogortsev Album cover by Toms Kalniņš
Ahida	EP	2023 Recording by Andrei Babrouka Mixing & Mastering by Andrei Babrouka Album cover by Alexandra Mikhalkovich Young And Cold Records (Vinyl, CD)
Znajomstva	Maxi-Single	2023
Adkaz	Album	2024 Recording by Roman Komogortsev, Andrei Babrouka Mixing by Andrei Babrouka, Pavel Tretyak Mastering by Andrei Babrouka Album cover by Jonathan Sirit Young And Cold Records (Vinyl, CD)
Razlad	EP	2026 Featuring Pakuty Young And Cold Records (Vinyl, CD)

=== Other releases ===
- Paharda (Remixes) (Album, 2021)
- U nikudy (Demo, 2017)
- Skryvaj (Demo, 2018)
- Mora (Acoustic, 2019)
- Ahida (Remixes) (EP, 2023)
