= Obey (Benedictum album) =

Studio album by Benedictum
- Released: November 29, 2013
- Genre: Heavy metal; power metal
- Length: 49:30
- Label: Frontiers Records
- Producer: John Herrera

Benedictum chronology
| Dominion (2011) | Obey (2013) |

Professional ratings
Review scores
| Source | Rating |
|---|---|
| Dead Rhetoric | 7.5/10 |
| Eternal Terror | 5/6 |
| Front Row Report | 8/10 |
| Ghost Cult Magazine | 3/10 |
| Hallowed | 4/7 |
| Metal Forces | 5/10 |
| Sonic Cathedral | 9/10 |

Dominion is the third studio album by the American heavy metal band Benedictum, released through Frontiers Records on November 29, 2013. A music video was released for the song "Scream". The band toured to promote the album, including supporting Y&T in their 40th Anniversary Tour in 2014.

== Track listing ==
Obey track listing
| No. | Title | Length |
|---|---|---|
| 1. | "Dream of the Banshee" | 0:57 |
| 2. | "Fractured" | 3:59 |
| 3. | "Obey" | 4:51 |
| 4. | "Fighting for My Life" | 3:00 |
| 5. | "Scream" | 4:08 |
| 6. | "Evil That We Do" | 3:50 |
| 7. | "Crossing Over" | 6:00 |
| 8. | "Cry" | 4:06 |
| 9. | "Thornz" | 4:22 |
| 10. | "Die to Love You" | 3:40 |
| 11. | "Apex Nation" | 3:37 |
| 12. | "Retrograde" | 7:00 |
| Total length: | | 49:30 |

== Personnel ==
- Veronica Freeman – lead vocals
- Pete Wells – guitar, backing vocals
- Aric Avina – bass, backing vocals
- Mikey Pannone – drums, backing vocals
