= Solitude (Black Sabbath song) =

Song by Black Sabbath

from the album Master of Reality
- A-side: "Children of the Grave"
- Released: August 1971
- Recorded: 1971
- Genre: Psychedelic folk
- Length: 5:02 (album version); 3:45 (single version)
- Label: Vertigo
- Songwriters: Tony Iommi; Bill Ward; Geezer Butler; Ozzy Osbourne
- Producer: Rodger Bain

"Solitude" is a song by English heavy metal band Black Sabbath. It was first released on their 1971 album Master of Reality, and later as the B-side to the single, "Children of the Grave".

== Overview ==
The song is about feeling depressed after breaking up with somebody. A delay effect was added to Ozzy’s vocals on the song to provide the effect of a second vocal track. This song features the multi-instrumental talents of guitarist Tony Iommi, who also plays flute and piano on the recording.

== Legacy ==
On the Rolling Stone's 500 Greatest Albums Of All Time, author Brett Schewitz wrote, "The song that surprised me most was 'Solitude.' Another quieter song, Ozzy's voice is the most beautiful I've ever heard it. I actually had to check that it was, in fact, him singing."

Loudwire ranks "Solitude" in the top 30 (29th place) amongst all 79 songs made by Black Sabbath with singer Ozzy Osbourne.

== Covers ==
The British doom metal band Cathedral recorded a cover of the song, which appears as a European bonus track on the 1994 Black Sabbath tribute album Nativity in Black: A Tribute to Black Sabbath.

"Solitude" was also covered by Norwegian experimental electronica band Ulver in 2007, and released on the group's seventh album Shadows of the Sun.

Another cover was released by Swedish progressive metal band Opeth on their eleventh album Pale Communion in 2014.

== Personnel ==
- Ozzy Osbourne – vocals
- Tony Iommi – guitars, flute, piano
- Geezer Butler – bass guitar
- Bill Ward – percussion
