= Uncreation =

Studio album by Benedictum
- Released: March 14, 2006
- Genre: Heavy metal
- Length: 53:31
- Label: Locomotive Music
- Producer: Jeff Pilson

Benedictum chronology
Uncreation (2006)	Seasons of Tragedy (2008)

Professional ratings
Review scores
Source	Rating
Allmusic	3/5 stars

Uncreation is the debut album by the American heavy metal band Benedictum, released through Locomotive Records on March 14, 2006. The album was originally due to be released in late 2005, but was delayed to 2006 to allow for some creative tweaking.

== Track listing ==
1. "Uncreation" – 5:32
2. "Benedictum" – 3:46
3. "#4" – 3:55
4. "Misogyny" – 5:13
5. "Ashes to Ashes" – 3:50
6. "Wicca" – 4:05
7. "Heaven and Hell" – 7:47 (Black Sabbath cover)
8. "Them" – 4:02
9. "Two Steps to the Sun" – 3:22
10. "Valkyrie Rising" – 8:43
11. "The Mob Rules" – 3:14 (Black Sabbath cover)

== Personnel ==
- Veronica Freeman – vocals
- Pete Wells – guitars
- Jesse Wright – bass
- Chris Morgan – keyboards
- Blackie Sanchez – drums

== Guest musicians ==
- Craig Goldy - lead guitar on "Valkyrie Rising"
- Jimmy Bain - bass on "The Mob Rules"
- Jeff Pilson - additional bass
