= Brownout (band) =

American latin-funk band

- Origin: Austin, Texas, United States
- Genres: Funk; Latin Rock
- Years active: 2003–Present
- Labels: Six Degrees Records, Free Style Records, Nat Geo, Ubiquity Presents, Fat Beats
- Members: Gilbert Elorreaga; Greg Gonzalez; John Speice IV; Matthew "Sweet Lou" Holmes; Mark "Speedy" Gonzales; Adrian Quesada; Beto Martinez; Josh Levy; Alex Marrero; Peter Stopschinski
- Past members: Leo Gauna; Johnny Lopez
- Website: brownoutmusic.com

Brownout is an American Latin-funk band from Austin, Texas. The band was originally formed as a side project of the members of the Grammy-award-winning band Grupo Fantasma.

Though the band was formed in 2003, as Grupo Fantasma took off in the early 2000s, Brownout was left "on the backburner", and the band's first album, Homenaje, wasn't released until 2008. Since then, the band has toured regularly across the United States, at events including Bonnaroo, High Sierra Music Festival, and Utopia Festival. Brownout has also served as a backing band for artists including Prince, Daniel Johnston, GZA and Bernie Worrell.

In 2014, the group released a series of covers of the British band Black Sabbath under the moniker "Brown Sabbath", which received praise from Black Sabbath lead vocalist Ozzy Osbourne, as well as critical acclaim from NPR, AllMusic and Rolling Stone.

In 2018, Brownout released an instrumental cover album of Public Enemy songs titled Fear of a Brown Planet. The album's title is a play on Public Enemy's 1990 album Fear of a Black Planet. NPR described Fear of a Brown Planet as "a living, breathing brand of funk that can cross generations."

Brownout's latest album, Berlin Sessions, was produced by Steve Berlin of Los Lobos and was released by Fat Beats Records on March 6, 2020.

== Discography ==
- Homenaje (2008)
- Aguilas & Cobras (2009)
- Oozy (2012)
- Brownout presents Brown Sabbath (2014)
- Brownout presents Brown Sabbath II (2016)
- Fear of a Brown Planet (2018).
- Berlin Sessions (2020)
