= Harry Carmean =

American painter (1922–2022)

- Born: August 5, 1922; Anthony, Kansas, U.S.
- Died: February 3, 2022 (aged 99); Santa Barbara, California
- Education: Art Center College of Design, École des Beaux-Arts
- Movement: Renaissance, Baroque, Mannerism, Impressionism, Surrealism

Harry Carmean (August 5, 1922 – February 3, 2022) was an American painter known for his figurative paintings based on the work of the old masters. The ideas of the Renaissance, Baroque, Mannerist and Impressionist art can all be seen in his work to varying degrees. He was renown for practicing a form of drawing known as "draughstmanship" in which specific art ideas are consistently applied throughout a drawing. He was an instructor at Art Center College of Design from 1952 through 1996 and had taught thousands of students.

== Biography ==
Carmean was first a singer before becoming an artist. After serving in the US Army in World War II, he quit singing and began studying art at École des Beaux-Arts in France and later at Art Center College of Design in Los Angeles. It was there that he met the painter Lorser Feitelson who strongly influenced Carmean's work. Carmean became involved with a circle of artists including Feitelson, Helen Lundeberg, colorist Stanton Macdonald-Wright and Frederick Hammersley.

In the 1960s he began a series of paintings featuring a family theme. These were done in a simple manner with muted colors and showed the influence of the Renaissance and Baroque art. It was at this time that Carmean came into his own as a painter and his compositions became more involved. In the '60s, Carmean was featured regularly on Feitelson's award-winning television show Feitelson on Art on KNBC in Los Angeles.

In the 1970s he continued to further explore the compositional ideas of past masters culminating in a series of Spanish café paintings characterized by a strong use of light and dark and an emphasis on defining forms. In the early '70s, he began a series of etchings depicting interior scenes and nudes which continued through the 1990s. From the 1970s through the 1990s, Carmean also completed a series of small wax sculptures inspired by the work of Rodin and Degas.

In the late 1980s, his style shifted and he began a new series of paintings depicting acrobats and dancers. In contrast to his early paintings, Carmean now focused on the use of white and his paintings had a lighter, more impressionistic feel. The acrobat theme originated from his early days as a singer and from his experiences in the entertainment world. In these works the compositions became increasingly complex with Mannerist elements, setting precedents in terms of classical composition. In the late 1980s, he also began a series of erotic drawings, etchings and paintings. In 1997 upon retiring from Art Center he moved from Los Angeles to Santa Barbara, California, where he continued to draw and paint.

== Personal life and death ==
Carmean died in Santa Barbara, California, on February 3, 2022, at the age of 99.

== Exhibitions and Museums ==
- Westmont College, Montecito, 2007
- Karpeles Manuscript Museum, Santa Barbara, 2001
- Los Angeles Art Association, 1970
- Marymount College, Los Angeles, CA, 1962
- Oakland Museum of California, current
- Fullerton College, Fullerton, CA, current
- Red Deer College, Canada, current

== Television ==
- Feitelson on Art, KNBC, Los Angeles 1964-5
- "The Incredible Human Machine", National Geographic Society television program, 1975
- "Carmean/Slater, the Figurative Tradition", Channel 21, Santa Barbara CA 2007
- "Creative Community", Channel 21 Santa Barbara, CA 2007

== Sources ==
- Art International, 1971
- Art News, 1974
- American Artist Magazine, 1975
- Harwood, June; Carmean, Frye & Smith, Ltd., 1975
- Jacobson, Linda; The Drawings of Harry Carmean, Bordon Publishing Co. 1975
- The Artist's Magazine, 1987
