= Children of the Grave =

Song by Black Sabbath

Single by Black Sabbath

from the album Master of Reality
- B-side: "Solitude"
- Released: August 1971
- Recorded: Island Studios, London, England
- Genre: Heavy metal; speed metal
- Length: 5:17 (album version); 3:47 (single version)
- Label: Vertigo
- Songwriters: Ozzy Osbourne, Tony Iommi, Geezer Butler, Bill Ward
- Producer: Rodger Bain

Black Sabbath singles chronology
"Paranoid" (1970)	"Children of the Grave" (1971)	"Iron Man" (1970)

"Children of the Grave" is a song by the English heavy metal band Black Sabbath, from their 1971 album Master of Reality. The song lyrically continues with the same anti-war themes brought on by "War Pigs" and "Electric Funeral" from the band's previous album Paranoid.

The song has been featured on a number of greatest hits and live albums by Black Sabbath, as well as by the band's lead vocalist Ozzy Osbourne during his solo career.

== Track listing ==
1. "Children of the Grave" (Edit) – 3:47
2. "Solitude" – 3:45

== Legacy ==
"Children of the Grave" is widely considered one of Black Sabbath's greatest songs. In 2020, Kerrang ranked the song number six on their list of the 20 greatest Black Sabbath songs, and in 2021, Louder Sound ranked the song number five on their list of the 40 greatest Black Sabbath songs. The song was used in the 2022 film Beavis and Butt-Head Do the Universe. The song is also playable in the 2010 video game Guitar Hero: Warriors of Rock.

== Cover versions ==
=== White Zombie version ===
"Children of the Grave"

Single by White Zombie

from the album Nativity in Black: A Tribute to Black Sabbath
- Released: 1994
- Recorded: 1994
- Studio: Eldorado Recording Studios, Los Angeles, California
- Genre: Heavy metal
- Length: 5:47
- Label: Columbia
- Songwriters: Geezer Butler; Tony Iommi; Ozzy Osbourne; Bill Ward
- Producers: Bryan Carlstrom; White Zombie

White Zombie singles chronology
"I Am Hell" (1993)	"Children of the Grave" (1994)	"Feed the Gods" (1994)

The band White Zombie covered "Children of the Grave" (with slightly altered lyrics) for the Black Sabbath tribute album Nativity in Black. It was later released as a promo single in 1994. The cover did not chart, but did receive some radio airplay on active rock stations in America.

==== Track listing ====
No.	Title	Length
1.	"Children of the Grave"	5:47
2.	"Children of the Grave" (Edit)	3:51

==== Personnel ====
White Zombie

- Rob Zombie – vocals
- Jay Yuenger – guitar
- Sean Yseult – bass
- Phil Buerstatte – drums

Production

- Bryan Carlstrom – production
- White Zombie – production
- Bob Chiappardi – executive producer
- Terry Date – mixing

=== Lamb of God version ===
American groove metal band Lamb of God covered the song as part of the Back to the Beginning farewell show of Black Sabbath, which took place on 5 July 2025. The following day, the band released the cover as a standalone single.
