= Master of Reality =

1971 studio album by Black Sabbath

Studio album by Black Sabbath
- Released: 6 August 1971
- Recorded: 7–15 February 1971; 6–13 April 1971
- Studio: Island (London)
- Genres: Heavy metal; doom metal
- Length: 34:29
- Labels: Vertigo (Europe); Warner Bros. (US)
- Producer: Rodger Bain

Black Sabbath chronology
Paranoid (1970)	Master of Reality (1971)	Vol. 4 (1972)

Singles from Master of Reality
- 1. "Children of the Grave" Released: August 1971

Master of Reality is the third studio album by the English heavy metal band Black Sabbath, released on 6 August 1971 by Vertigo Records. It is regarded by some critics as the foundation of stoner rock and sludge metal. Produced by Rodger Bain, who also produced the band's prior two albums, Master of Reality was recorded at Island Studios in London from February to April 1971. This would end up being their last album produced by Bain, as production duties would be taken over by guitarist Tony Iommi for their subsequent albums.

Iommi and bassist Geezer Butler downtuned their instruments during the production, achieving what Iommi called a "bigger, heavier sound". The band generally approached the album with a more experimental lens, partly due to having more time to record and write than on their previous albums.

Master of Reality peaked at number five on the UK Albums Chart and number eight on the US Billboard 200. Though negatively received by critics on release, the album is now considered one of the greatest heavy metal albums of all time. It was certified double platinum by the Recording Industry Association of America (RIAA) after having sold over two million copies in the US.

== Background ==
By 1971, Sabbath had become a highly successful band in the UK and US, and were considered, along with Led Zeppelin and Deep Purple, part of the "unholy trinity of British hard-rock and heavy metal". Despite negative critical perceptions of their music, both their eponymous debut and their sophomore album Paranoid were commercially successful in both the US and the UK. In February 1971, after a one-off performance at the Myponga Pop Festival in Australia, Black Sabbath returned to the studio to begin work on their third album.

== Recording ==
Master of Reality was recorded at Island Studios in London from February to April 1971. The album was produced by Rodger Bain, who had also produced Black Sabbath's previous two albums, with Tom Allom handling engineering. This was to be Bain's final collaboration with Black Sabbath as guitarist Tony Iommi took over production for the band's next several albums. Drummer Bill Ward explained: "Previously, we didn't have a clue what to do in the studio, and relied heavily on Rodger. But this time we were a lot more together, understood what was involved and were more opinionated on how things should be done."

On the tracks "Children of the Grave", "Lord of This World", and "Into the Void", Iommi downtuned his guitar 1 1/2 steps in an effort to reduce string tension, thus making the guitar less painful for him to play. This pain was the result of a factory accident years earlier in which he had the tips of two of his fingers severed. The downtuning also helped the guitarist produce what he called a "bigger, heavier sound". Geezer Butler also downtuned his bass guitar to match Iommi. "It helped with the sound, too", Butler explained to Guitar for the Practicing Musician in 1994. "Then it got to the point where we tuned even lower to make it easier vocal-wise. But Ozzy [Osbourne] would then sing higher so it sort of defeated the object."

In the 2013 biography of the band Black Sabbath: Symptom of the Universe, Mick Wall writes that "the Sabbath sound took a plunge into even greater darkness. Bereft even of reverb, leaving their sound as dry as old bones dug up from some desert burial plot, the finished music's brutish force would so alarm the critics they would punish Sabbath in print for being blatantly thuggish, purposefully mindless, creepy, and obnoxious. Twenty years later groups like Smashing Pumpkins, Soundgarden, and, particularly, Nirvana, would excavate the same heaving lung sound ... And be rewarded with critical garlands." In his autobiography I Am Ozzy, vocalist Osbourne states that he cannot remember much about recording Master of Reality "apart from the fact that Tony detuned his guitar to make it easier to play, Geezer wrote 'Sweet Leaf' about all the dope we'd been smoking, and 'Children of the Grave' was the most kick-ass song we'd ever recorded."

In the liner notes to the 1998 live album Reunion, drummer Ward commented that Master of Reality was "an exploratory album". Ward elaborated in a 2016 interview with Metal Hammer magazine: "On the first album, we had two days to do everything, and not much more time for Paranoid. But now we could take our time, and try out different things. We all embraced the opportunity: Tony threw in classical guitar parts, Geezer's bass was virtually doubled in power, I went for bigger bass drums, also experimenting with overdubs. And Ozzy was so much better. But this was the first time when we didn't have gigs booked in, and could just focus on making the album a landmark." In 2013, Mojo magazine called Master of Reality "The sound of a band becoming increasingly comfortable in their studio surroundings."

Iommi believes the band might have become too comfortable, however, telling Guitar World in 1992, "During Master of Reality, we started getting more experimental and began taking too much time to record. Ultimately, I think it really confused us. Sometimes I think I'd really like to go back to the way we recorded the first two albums. I've always preferred just going into the studio and playing, without spending a lot of time rehearsing or getting sounds." The song "Into the Void" was especially problematic, with Iommi saying in the same interview: "We tried recording 'Into the Void' in a couple of different studios because Bill just couldn't get it right. Whenever that happened, he would start believing that he wasn't capable of playing the song. He'd say: 'To hell with it – I'm not doing this!' There was one track like that on every album, and 'Into the Void' was the most difficult one on Master of Reality."

In his autobiography Iron Man: My Journey Through Heaven and Hell with Black Sabbath, Iommi describes the difficulty Osbourne also experienced recording the vocal: "It has this slow bit, but then the riff where Osbourne comes in is very fast. Osbourne had to sing really rapidly: "Rocket engines burning fuel so fast, up into the night sky they blast," quick words like that. Geezer had written all the words out for him ... Seeing him try was hilarious." For "Solitude" Iommi played guitar, flute, and piano. A delay effect was later added to Osbourne's vocals on the song as a means of doubling the vocal track.

== Composition ==
During the album's recording sessions, Osbourne brought Iommi a large joint which caused the guitarist to cough uncontrollably. Iommi was recording acoustic guitar parts at the time, and his coughing fit was captured on tape. A fragment of Iommi's coughing was later added by producer Bain as the intro to "Sweet Leaf", a song which was admittedly an ode to marijuana use. Iommi recalls "We all played 'Sweet Leaf' while stoned." In an interview with Guitar World in 2001 Butler recalled: "I do remember writing "Sweet Leaf" in the studio. I'd just come back from Dublin, and they'd had these cigarettes called Sweet Afton, which you could only get in Ireland. We were going: "What could we write about?" I took out this cigarette packet, and as you opened it, it's got on the lid: "it's the sweetest leaf that gives you the taste" I was like: "Ah, Sweet Leaf!" Writing in Mojo in 2013, Phil Alexander observed: "To most it is the quintessential stoner anthem, a point borne out by Sabbath's own Olympian consumption of hashish during their early days." In the Black Sabbath concert film The Last Supper, Ward ruminates: "Did it enhance the music? Well, you know, we wrote 'Sweet Leaf': 'When I first met you / didn't realize', that's about meeting marijuana, having a relationship with marijuana ... That was part of our lifestyle at that time."

Butler, the band's primary lyricist, had a Catholic upbringing, and the song "After Forever" focuses entirely on Christian themes. At the time, Black Sabbath were suspected by some observers of being Satanists due to their dark sound, image, and lyrics. "After Forever" was released as a single along with "Fairies Wear Boots" in 1971.

Speaking of “After Forever” in an interview with Rolling Stone, Bill Ward states “I thought we were very risqué lyrically with that…and I think that was a very controversial song, especially for its time. I like that we were stepping out and breaking musical rules or lyrical rules…I thought that was quite courageous...listen to the rest of the lyrics and they’re actually quite meaningful, in terms of having harmony among different people and different races of people…It was actually supposed to be that kind of a song. But it also asks questions, and it asks quite deliberate questions.”

== Artwork ==
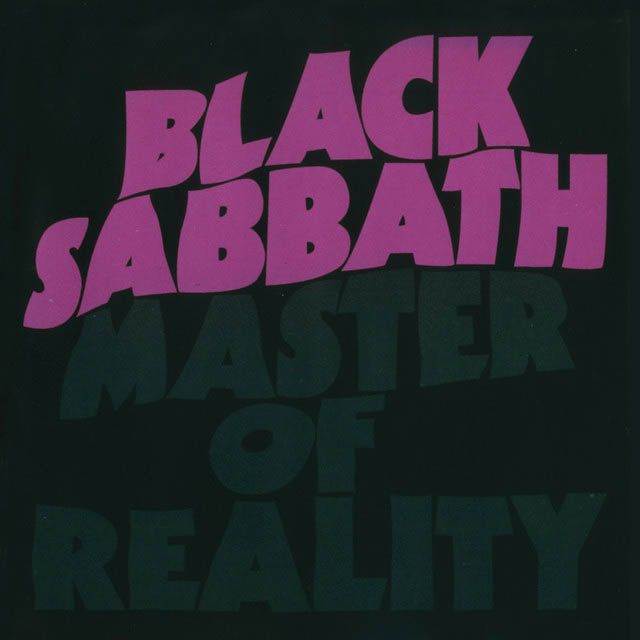
Re-released non-embossed cover

The first editions of Master of Reality came in an 'envelope sleeve' containing a poster of the band, and with the album's title embossed in black lettering, visible in relief. Later editions lacking the embossed printing would render the album title in grey. This was the first Black Sabbath sleeve on which the lyrics were reproduced on the back of the sleeve. In his autobiography Iommi describes the cover as "Slightly Spinal Tap-ish, only well before Spinal Tap". The labels of the album were different too, as Side A featured the infamous swirl label, although the black circles were white and the white circles black. Side B, which was the information label, was black with white writing instead of white with black writing. That variant of the Vertigo label was never to be used again thereafter.

On the first North American editions of the album, several songs had subtitles given to segments, making it appear that there were more songs than there actually were. The intro of "After Forever" was given the title "The Elegy", the coda of "Children of the Grave" was called "The Haunting", the intro of "Lord of This World" was titled "Step Up", and the intro of "Into the Void" called "Deathmask". This treatment had also been used on the North American editions of Black Sabbath's previous two albums. These pressings also incorrectly listed the album title as Masters of Reality. Subsequent editions corrected the album's title and removed three of the four subtitles (all but "The Elegy").

== Reception ==
Retrospective professional reviews
Review scores
Source	Rating
AllMusic	5/5 stars
Christgau's Record Guide	C−
MusicHound Rock	4.5/5 stars
Q	5/5 stars
The Rolling Stone Album Guide (1992)	3/5 stars
The Rolling Stone Album Guide (2004)	4/5 stars
Sputnikmusic	4/5
Uncut	9/10

Master of Reality peaked at number five on the UK Albums Chart, and number eight in the United States. It eventually sold two million copies in the US. Despite the album's commercial success, it was viewed with disdain by contemporary music critics. In The Village Voice, Robert Christgau called it "a dim-witted, amoral exploitation". Rolling Stone magazine's Lester Bangs described it as "monotonous" and hardly an improvement over its predecessor, although he found the lyrics more revealing because they offer "some answers to the dark cul-de-sacs of Paranoid".

Ultimate Classic Rock fanzine called the album a “down-tuned tour de force and stoner-metal linchpin.”

In a retrospective overview of the band’s releases through their career, The Guardian reflects that “Master of Reality was Black Sabbath’s most subtle album yet and their most bludgeoning. Ward’s jazzy drumming – somehow swinging and precise – propelled even the most straightforward of the tracks. (Children of the Grave would be a pretty good boogie without Ward; he makes it monstrous.) The previous album was called “Paranoid”, but this was the one that sounded paranoid. The cause was perhaps the subject of the album’s opener, “Sweet Leaf”, on which a looped cough gives way to an Iommi riff so brutal that it is almost a caricature, before Osbourne spends several minutes explaining just how much he likes weed. A masterpiece.”

== Legacy ==
In 1994, Master of Reality was ranked number 28 in Colin Larkin's Top 50 Heavy Metal Albums. Larkin described it as Sabbath's "first real international breakthrough" and "a remarkable piece of work". In MusicHound Rock: The Essential Album Guide (1999), authors Gary Graff and Daniel Durcholz described the album as a "brilliant skull crusher", singling out "Children of the Grave" and "Sweet Leaf" as "timeless". In 2001, Q included it in their list of the 50 Heaviest Albums of All Time, calling it "malevolent ... Casting Black Sabbath as a Titanic-style house band on the eve of Armageddon, cranking it as the bomb drops." A critic for the magazine cited it as "the most cohesive record of [the band's] first three albums." In 2003, Rolling Stone ranked the album number 298 in their list of the 500 greatest albums of all time, 300 in a 2012 revised list, and 234 in a 2020 revised list. They described the album as representing "the greatest sludge-metal band of them all in its prime." The same magazine also ranked the album 34th on its "100 Greatest Metal Albums of All Time".

The album has been cited as a foundational influence on numerous subgenres of heavy metal, particularly stoner rock and sludge metal. Billy Corgan, leader of the Smashing Pumpkins, considered Master of Reality the album that "spawned grunge". John Stanier, drummer for Helmet and Tomahawk, cited the record as the one that inspired him to become a musician. In 2013, Sabbath biographer Mick Wall praised Iommi's "ability to incorporate more neat riffs and sudden unexpected time changes in one song than most bands would contemplate on an entire album."

In 2017, Ward ranked Master of Reality as his favorite Black Sabbath album he has worked on.

== Track listing ==
=== Original UK LP pressing ===
All songs written by Black Sabbath (Tony Iommi, Geezer Butler, Ozzy Osbourne, Bill Ward), except "After Forever", "Embryo" and "Orchid" by Iommi.

Side A, standard edition
No.	Title	Length
1.	"Sweet Leaf"	5:05
2.	"After Forever"	5:27
3.	"Embryo" (instrumental)	0:28
4.	"Children of the Grave"	5:18
Total length:		16:18

Side B
No.	Title	Length
5.	"Orchid" (instrumental)	1:31
6.	"Lord of This World"	5:27
7.	"Solitude"	5:02
8.	"Into the Void"	6:13
Total length:		18:13; 34:29

=== Original US LP pressing ===
Side A
No.	Title	Length
1.	"Sweet Leaf"	5:02
2.	"After Forever (including The Elegy)"	5:25
3.	"Embryo"	0:29
4.	"Children of the Grave"	4:30
5.	"The Haunting"	0:45
Total length:		16:11

Side B
No.	Title	Length
6.	"Orchid"	1:30
7.	"Step Up"	0:30
8.	"Lord of This World"	4:55
9.	"Solitude"	5:02
10.	"Deathmask"	3:08
11.	"Into the Void"	3:08
Total length:		18:13; 34:30

Note that, while the overall timing of "Deathmask/Into the Void" is approximately correct, the apportioning of time between the two parts of the song may be arbitrary, as the 3:08 mark occurs during "Into the Void"'s middle-8 vocal section ("Freedom fighters sent off to the sun ..."). The revised US pressing timings, shown below, compound this likely error.

=== Revised US LP pressing, with subtitles removed ===
No.	Title	Length
1.	"Sweet Leaf"	5:02
2.	"After Forever (including The Elegy)"	5:25
3.	"Embryo"	0:30
4.	"Children of the Grave"	5:15
Total length:		16:12

Side B
No.	Title	Length
5.	"Orchid"	2:00
6.	"Lord of This World"	4:55
7.	"Solitude"	8:08
8.	"Into the Void"	3:08
Total length:		18:11; 34:29

Note that the timing of "Orchid" on revised US pressings is incorrect: it includes the "Step Up" introductory section of "Lord of This World". The timing of "Solitude" on these pressings is also incorrect, as it includes the first half of "Into the Void", whereas the timings of "Deathmask" and "Into the Void" from the original US pressing should have been grouped instead.

US-made compact disc pressings of Master of Reality continue to list the incorrect timings of the revised US LP pressing on the CD booklet. However, the songs are not indexed on the CD using those timings – the breaks between songs are correctly placed.

=== 2009 deluxe edition ===
A two-disc deluxe edition was released in the UK on 29 June 2009 and in the US on 14 July 2009 as an import. This deluxe edition was remastered by Andy Pearce who also did the deluxe editions of Black Sabbath and Paranoid.

Disc one
No.	Title	Length
1.	"Sweet Leaf"	5:05
2.	"After Forever"	5:27
3.	"Embryo"	0:28
4.	"Children of the Grave"	5:18
5.	"Orchid"	1:31
6.	"Lord of This World"	5:27
7.	"Solitude"	5:02
8.	"Into the Void"	6:13
Total length:		34:29

Disc two (bonus tracks)
No.	Title	Length
1.	"Weevil Woman '71"	3:00
2.	"Sweet Leaf" (studio outtake featuring alternative lyrics)	5:04
3.	"After Forever" (studio outtake – instrumental)	5:20
4.	"Children of the Grave" (studio outtake featuring alternative lyrics)	4:36
5.	"Children of the Grave" (studio outtake – instrumental)	6:01
6.	"Orchid" (studio outtake – with Tony count-in)	1:41
7.	"Lord of This World" (studio outtake featuring piano & slide guitar)	5:38
8.	"Solitude" (studio outtake – intro with alternative guitar tuning)	3:35
9.	"Spanish Sid (Early Version of 'Into the Void')" (studio outtake – alternative version)	6:24
Total length:		41:29

== Personnel ==
- Ozzy Osbourne – lead vocals
- Tony Iommi – guitar, synthesiser on "After Forever" and "Children of the Grave", flute and piano on "Solitude", acoustic guitar on "Orchid", cough on "Sweet Leaf"
- Geezer Butler – bass
- Bill Ward – drums, percussion on "Children of the Grave", sleigh bells on "Solitude"
- Keef – photography, poster design
- Mike Stanford – art direction

== Charts ==
=== Weekly charts ===
Initial weekly chart performance for Master of Reality
Chart (1971)	Peak position
Australian Albums (Kent Music Report)	4
Canada Top Albums/CDs (RPM)	6
Dutch Albums (Album Top 100)	10
Finnish Albums (The Official Finnish Charts)	3
German Albums (Offizielle Top 100)	5
Italian Albums (Musica e Dischi)	8
Norwegian Albums (VG-lista)	12
UK Albums (Official Charts)	5
US Billboard 200	8

Later weekly chart performance for Master of Reality
Chart (2016–2025)	Peak position
Croatian International Albums (HDU)	11
Greek Albums (IFPI)	5
Scottish Albums (Official Charts)	13
UK Albums (Official Charts)	51
UK Independent Albums (Official Charts)	3
UK Rock & Metal Albums (Official Charts)	1
US Top Catalog Albums (Billboard)	22

=== Year-end charts ===
1971 year-end chart performance for Master of Reality
Chart (1971)	Position
Dutch Albums (Album Top 100)	74
German Albums (Offizielle Top 100)	40

1972 year-end chart performance for Master of Reality
Chart (1972)	Position
US Billboard 200	76

== Certifications ==
Region	Certification	Certified units/sales
Canada (Music Canada)	Platinum	100,000^{^}
United Kingdom (BPI)	Gold	100,000^{‡}
United States (RIAA)	2× Platinum	2,000,000^{^}
^{^} Shipments figures based on certification alone.^{‡} Sales+streaming figures based on certification alone.

== Release history ==
Region	Date	Label	Format	Catalog
United Kingdom	6 August 1971	Vertigo	LP	6360 050
United Kingdom	1992	Castle	CD	CA198
United States	16 August 1971	Warner Bros.	LP	BS-2562
United States	12 May 1987	Warner Bros.	CD	2562–2
UK remastered	29 March 2009	Sanctuary	double CD	2701108
