= List of Today Is the Day members =

Today Is the Day is an American noise rock / avant-garde metal band originally formed in Nashville, Tennessee. The band's diverse sound combines influences from areas such as noise music, avant-garde metal, grindcore, post-hardcore, and alternative rock among other genres. Most of the band's recordings make extensive use of dissonance and sampling, as well as unusual production techniques and psychedelic overtones. Lyrical themes include depression, warfare, violence, altered states of consciousness, and mental disorders.

== Members ==
=== Current ===
Image	Name	Years active	Instruments	Release contributions
	Steve Austin	1992–present	lead vocals; guitars; keyboards; bass	all Today Is the Day releases
	Thomas Jack	2020–present	bass; keyboards	Never Give In (2025)
	Colin Frecknall	2021–present	drums	Never Give In (2025)

=== Former ===
Image	Name	Years active	Instruments	Release contributions
	Brad Elrod	1992–1996; 1998	drums	How To Win Friends and Influence People (1992); Supernova (1993); "I Bent Scared" (1993); Willpower (1994); Today Is the Day (1996); Live Till You Die (2000); Blue Blood (2002); Willpower Live (2007); Today Is the Day Live (2007); Live At The Whisky A Go-Go (2008)
	Mike Herrell	1992–1996; died 2025	bass	How To Win Friends and Influence People (1993); Supernova (1993); "I Bent Scared" (1993); Willpower (1994); Willpower Live (2007)
	Cody McCall	1996–1997	bass	none
	Scott Wexton	1996	keyboards	Today Is the Day (1996); Today Is the Day Live (2007)
	Philip Wiseman	1996	drums	none
	Dave Rosenberg	1996	drums	none
	Mike Hyde	1996–1998	drums	Temple of the Morning Star (1997); Live Till You Die (2000)
	Milan Dietz	1997	bass	
	Chris Reeser	1997–1999	bass; keyboards	Temple of the Morning Star (1997); Live Till You Die (2000); Blue Blood (2002); Live At The Whisky A Go-Go (2008)
	Brann Dailor	1998–2000	drums	In the Eyes of God (1999); Live Till You Die (2000)
	Bill Kelliher	1999–2000	bass	In the Eyes of God (1999); Live Till You Die (2000)
	Chris Debari	2000–2008	bass; guitar; backing vocals	Zodiac Dreaming (split with 16; 2001); The Descent (split with Metatron; 2001); Sadness Will Prevail (2002); Kiss the Pig (2004); Axis of Eden (2007); Live In Japan (2008)
	Brian Epistalla	2000	drums	none
	Marshall Kilpatric	2000–2002	drums	Zodiac Dreaming (split with 16; 2001); The Descent (split with Metatron; 2001); Sadness Will Prevail (2002)
	John Gillis	2002–2004	drums	Live In Japan (2008)
	Mike Rosswog	2004; 2008	drums	Kiss the Pig (2004)
	Jeff Lohrber	2005; 2008; 2013-2014	drums	Animal Mother (2014)
	Aaron Kotilainen	2005	keyboards	none
	Graham Leduc	2006	drums	none
	Derek Roddy	2006–2008	drums	Axis of Eden (2007)
	John Judkins	2008–2010	bass; backing vocals	none
	Julien Granger	2008–2010	drums	none
	Curran Reynolds	2010–2013	drums	Pain Is a Warning (2011)
	Ryan Jones	2010–2013	bass; backing vocals	Pain Is a Warning (2011)
	Sean Conkling	2013–2014	bass; keyboards	Animal Mother (2014)
	Douglas Andrae	2013–2017	drums	none
	Trevor Thomas	2014–2017	bass	none
	DJ Cox	2017–2020	bass; keyboards	"Parasite" (2017); No Good to Anyone (2020)
	Tom Bennett	2017–2019	drums	"Parasite" (2017); No Good to Anyone (2020)
	Vishnu Reddy	2019–2021	drums	none
