= Today Is the Day discography =

- Studio albums: 11
- Live albums: 7
- Compilation albums: 2
- Music videos: 15
- Splits: 5

Today Is the Day is an American noise rock and experimental metal band that originally formed in Nashville, Tennessee, and is currently based in Orland, Maine. The band's discography includes eleven studio albums, two compilation albums, five split releases, a demo EP, various singles, and numerous live / video releases.

== Albums ==
=== Studio albums ===
Title	Album details
Supernova	Released: April 10, 1993; Label: Amphetamine Reptile; Format: CD, LP, CS, DL
Willpower	Released: September 5, 1994; Label: Amphetamine Reptile; Format: CD, LP, CS, DL
Today Is the Day	Released: March 26, 1996; Label: Amphetamine Reptile; Format: CD, LP, CS, DL
Temple of the Morning Star	Released: September 23, 1997; Label: Relapse; Format: CD, LP, DL
In the Eyes of God	Released: July 20, 1999; Label: Relapse; Format: CD, LP, DL
Sadness Will Prevail	Released: September 3, 2002; Label: Relapse; Format: 2×CD, DL
Kiss the Pig	Released: June 29, 2004; Label: Relapse; Format: CD, LP, DL
Axis of Eden	Released: September 18, 2007; Label: SuperNova; Format: CD, DL
Pain Is a Warning	Released: August 16, 2011; Label: Black Market Activities; Format: CD, LP, DL
Animal Mother	Released: October 21, 2014; Label: Southern Lord; Format: CD, LP, DL
No Good to Anyone	Released: February 28, 2020; Label: BMG / The End; Format: CD, LP, DL
Never Give In	Released: October 3, 2025; Label: SuperNova; Format: CD, LP, DL

=== Live albums ===
Title	Album details
Blue Blood	Released: September 23, 2002; Label: Rage of Achilles; Format: CD

=== Compilation albums ===
Title	Album details
Live Till You Die	Released: August 29, 2000; Label: Relapse; Format: CD, DL
Silver Anniversary	Released: January 20, 2017; Label: The End; Format: DL

== Extended plays ==
Title	Release details
How to Win Friends and Influence People (demo)	Released: 1992; Label: Supernova, The End (reissue); Format: CS, 10", DL
Zodiac Dreaming (split with 16)	Released: 2001; Label: Trash Art!; Format: MCD
The Descent (split with Metatron)	Released: August 14, 2001; Label: Dark Reign; Format: CD, DL
Paste Studio - Feb 28, 2020	Released: February 28, 2020; Label: Paste Magazine; Format: DL

== Singles ==
Title	Release details
"I Bent Scared" / "Come On Down and Get Saved"	Released: 1993; Label: Amphetamine Reptile; Format: 7"
"Split EP" (split with Wrench)	Released: 1996; Label: ZK; Format: 7"
"Change Zine Eight" (split with The Automatic Few)	Released: 1996; Label: Change Zine; Format: 7"
"In These Black Days Volume 3" (split with Coalesce)	Released: 1997; Label: Hydra Head; Format: 7"
"The Man Who Loves to Hurt Himself"	Released: 1997; Label: Hydra Head; Format: 7"
"Sick of Your Mouth"	Released: March 5, 2013; Label: SuperNova; Format: DL
"Parasite"	Released: September 1, 2017; Label: Decibel Flexi Series; Format: 7" flexi
"No Good to Anyone"	Released: December 12, 2019; Label: BMG; Format: DL
"You're All Gonna Die"	Released: January 9, 2020; Label: BMG; Format: DL
"Burn in Hell"	Released: February 13, 2020; Label: BMG; Format: DL

== Other appearances ==
Song	Year	Compilation	Label	Notes
"Hands & Knees"	1993	Clusterfuck	Amphetamine Reptile	Included as bonus tracks on remastered versions of Today Is the Day.
"Pipedream Zero"	1994	Clusterfuck '94	Amphetamine Reptile	Included as bonus tracks on remastered versions of Today Is the Day.
"Execution Style"	1995	Dope-Guns-'N-Fucking In The Streets Volume Ten	Amphetamine Reptile	Outtake from Willpower; included as a bonus track on remastered versions of the album.
"Sadness Will Prevail"	2000	Contaminated 3.0	Relapse	Original demo version.
"Nothing Else Matters"	2005	The Old, The New, The Unreleased: Undecided Records Sampler	Undecided	Cover of a Metallica song.
"I Know That You're Lying"	2006	Threat: Music That Inspired the Movie	Halo 8	Remix by Darph/Nader of the song "Willpower".
"In the Eyes of God" (live)	2015	Maryland Deathfest: The Movie 3 Official Soundtrack	Handshake Inc	Live audio recorded at the 2012 Maryland Deathfest Festival.
"Pinnacle" (live)	2015	Maryland Deathfest: The Movie 3 Official Soundtrack	Handshake Inc	Live audio recorded at the 2012 Maryland Deathfest Festival.

== Videography ==
=== Video albums ===
Title	Album details
Willpower Live	Released: August 7, 2007; Label: SuperNova; Format: DVD
Today Is the Day Live	Released: August 7, 2007; Label: SuperNova; Format: DVD
Live in Japan	Released: September 15, 2008; Label: SuperNova; Format: DL
Live at the Whiskey A Go-Go	Released: September 15, 2008 (DVD & LP: March 24, 2017); Label: SuperNova, The End; Format: DL, DVD, LP
Axis of Eden - The Film	Released: November 2, 2008; Label: SuperNova; Format: DL
Die by the Wolf	Released: September 28, 2010; Label: Relapse; Format: DVD

=== Music videos ===
Title	Year	Director(s)
"6 Dementia Satyr"	1994	Donnie Briley
"Realization"	1996	Tom Hazelmyer
"Pinnacle"	1997	Adam Ahlbrandt
"The Descent"	2002	Adam Ahlbrandt
"Mother's Ruin"	2004	Adam Ahlbrandt
"This Machine Kills Fascists"	2004	Adam Ahlbrandt
"IED"	2008	Tate Steinsiek and David Hall
"Free at Last"	2008	David Hall
"Daddy"	2008	Bruce Millet
"Masada"	2014	David Hall
"Heathen"	2015	Neil Barrett
"Expectations Exceed Reality"	2015	Adam Ahlbrandt and Steve Austin
"Animal Mother"	2016	David Hall
"Blindspot"	2017	David Hall
"Burn in Hell"	2020	David Hall

=== Other appearances ===
Song	Year	Compilation	Label	Notes
"6 Dementia Satyr"	1994	Harakiri No.2	Harakiri Magazine	Live footage recorded in 1994 in Munich, Germany.
"I Bent Scared"	1994	Harakiri No.2	Harakiri Magazine	Live footage recorded in 1994 in Munich, Germany.
"Criminal"	2004	Contamination Festival 2003	Relapse	Live footage recorded at the 2003 Relapse Records Contamination Festival.
"Maggots and Riots"	2004	Contamination Festival 2003	Relapse	Live footage recorded at the 2003 Relapse Records Contamination Festival.
"Mayari"	2004	Contamination Festival 2003	Relapse	Live footage recorded at the 2003 Relapse Records Contamination Festival.
"The Man Who Loves to Hurt Himself"	2004	Contamination Festival 2003	Relapse	Live footage recorded at the 2003 Relapse Records Contamination Festival.
"In the Eyes of God"	2013	Maryland Deathfest: The Movie III	Handshake Inc	Live footage recorded at the 2012 Maryland Deathfest Festival.
"Pinnacle"	2013	Maryland Deathfest: The Movie III	Handshake Inc	Live footage recorded at the 2012 Maryland Deathfest Festival.

== See also ==
- Amphetamine Reptile Records discography
- SuperNova Records discography
- The End Records discography
