= Rock the Foe Hammer =

Studio album by Warlord
- Released: July 13, 1999
- Recorded: 1998–1999
- Genre: Metalcore, noise rock
- Length: 54:32
- Label: Solid State Records
- Producer: Steve Austin

Warlord chronology
Warlord EP (1997)	Rock the Foe Hammer (1999)

Professional ratings
Review scores
Source	Rating
AllMusic	2.5/5 stars
The Phantom Tollbooth	1.5/5 stars

Rock the Foe Hammer is the debut and only album by American metal band Warlord. The album was released on July 13, 1999 on Solid State Records. It was the first release to feature Bassist Phil Smith.

== Critical reception ==
AllMusic critic Steve Huey writes "Heaven's Metal group Warlord [...] offers their first full-length album for Solid State Records with Rock the Foe Hammer. Their spiritual message comes across loud and clear, but they may have concentrated on it at the expense of the music: too many songs meander from riff to riff without building to climaxes or touching on memorable musical themes. It isn't that the music isn't headbang-worthy; it's just that the compositions need a clearer, tighter focus to be really effective."

Joe Rockstroh of The Phantom Tollbooth wrote "Why the band opted not to continue to develop their "doomcore" sound will probably become one of those never-ending debates. While this album is decent in areas such as production and lyrics, it falls short with boring riffs and grooves, endless songs, and those wretched vocals. I've come to expect a certain level of quality from Solid State, and this does nothing to further that trust. Meanwhile, I'll continue to hope that some band, somewhere will pick up where the Warlord EP left off."

Chris Gramlich of Exclaim! said "With a name and title that either implies some sort of Manowar worship or black metal leanings, Warlord prove that old book and cover theory by not only being good, but by being something totally unexpected. Noise rock, metal, stomp rock? Warlord is nothing if not abrasive, tipping their axes to the likes of Unsane, Willpower-era Today is the Day and the defunct Cable. Warlord’s chosen path of righteous musically destruction was overseen by the Reverend Steve Austin (T.I.T.D.), and while Rock the Foe Hammer strays a bit to close to its influences, the non-stop noise assault is still damaging nevertheless. (Solid State)"

== Track listing ==
No.	Title	Length
1.	"Internal Combustion"	3:41
2.	"Skody's Coming"	0:16
3.	"When Reality Sinks In"	6:15
4.	"Let's Ride"	5:10
5.	"In Vain We Fail"	4:08
6.	"The Glory Days"	7:04
7.	"Wasting Time"	2:55
8.	"Wolf to Eat"	4:20
9.	"A Knife in the Dark"	3:07
10.	"Skody's Foe Hammer"	0:48
11.	"Experience the Experience"	2:39
12.	"To Die For"	14:09
Total length:		54:32

== Credits ==
Warlord

- Ricky Rodgers - Vocals, Guitar
- Phil Smith - Bass, Backing Vocals
- Timothy Henderson - Drums

Production

- Steve Austin - Producer
- Craig Smith - Engineer
