= In These Black Days =

- Volumes 1–6

Compilation album by various artists
- Released: 1997–1999
- Genre: Heavy metal
- Length: 66:47 (total)
- Label: Hydra Head

Professional ratings
Review scores
Source	Rating
Allmusic	(Vol. 2)

In These Black Days: A Tribute to Black Sabbath is a six-volume Black Sabbath tribute series, released in the late 1990s as a series of split 7" singles by various artists on Hydra Head Records.

A double CD compiling all of the songs from the 7"s with additional Black Sabbath covers from other bands associated with Hydra Head Records was planned for years, but has not been released.

In 2013, all six volumes were re-released in a 7×7" box set that is limited to fewer than 100 copies.

== Track listing ==
=== Volume 1 ===
No.	Title	Writer(s)	Cover artist	Length
1.	"Killing Yourself to Live" (Sabbath Bloody Sabbath, 1973)	Butler, Iommi, Osbourne, Ward	Anal Cunt	3:40
2.	"It's Alright / Sabbra Cadabra / Blow on a Jug" (Technical Ecstasy, 1976 / Sabbath Bloody Sabbath, 1973 / Sabotage, 1975)	Butler, Iommi, Osbourne, Ward	Anal Cunt	1:42
3.	"Sabbath Jam" (Medley of "Cornucopia" (Vol. 4, 1972), "Hand of Doom" (Paranoid, 1970) and "Behind the Wall of Sleep" (Black Sabbath, 1970))	Geezer Butler, Tony Iommi, Ozzy Osbourne, Bill Ward	Eyehategod	6:02

=== Volume 2 ===
No.	Title	Writer(s)	Cover artist	Length
1.	"Cornucopia" (Vol. 4, 1972)	Butler, Iommi, Osbourne, Ward	Brutal Truth	3:14
2.	"Snowblind" (Vol. 4, 1972)	Butler, Iommi, Osbourne, Ward	Converge	4:29

=== Volume 3 ===
No.	Title	Writer(s)	Cover artist	Length
1.	"Sabbath Bloody Sabbath" (Sabbath Bloody Sabbath, 1973)	Butler, Iommi, Osbourne, Ward	Today Is the Day	6:05
2.	"Supernaut" (Vol. 4, 1972)	Butler, Iommi, Osbourne, Ward	Coalesce	3:21

=== Volume 4 ===
Disc 1
No.	Title	Writer(s)	Cover artist	Length
1.	"Into the Void" (Master of Reality, 1971)	Butler, Iommi, Osbourne, Ward	Cavity	6:03
2.	"Planet Caravan" (Paranoid, 1970)	Butler, Iommi, Osbourne, Ward	Cable	2:52

Disc 2
No.	Title	Writer(s)	Cover artist	Length
1.	"Hole in the Sky" (Sabotage, 1975)	Butler, Iommi, Osbourne, Ward	Jesuit	3:48
2.	"A National Acrobat" (Sabbath Bloody Sabbath, 1973)	Butler, Iommi, Osbourne, Ward	Overcast	5:32

=== Volume 5 ===
No.	Title	Writer(s)	Cover artist	Length
1.	"N.I.B." (Black Sabbath, 1970)	Butler, Iommi, Osbourne, Ward	Cave In	4:14
2.	"The Wizard" (Black Sabbath, 1970)	Butler, Iommi, Osbourne, Ward	Botch	4:26

=== Volume 6 ===
No.	Title	Writer(s)	Cover artist	Length
1.	"Children of the Grave" (Master of Reality, 1971)	Butler, Iommi, Osbourne, Ward	Neurosis	5:40
2.	"Lord of the Southern Priest" (Medley of "Lord of This World" (Master of Reality, 1971), "The Sign of the Southern Cross" (Mob Rules, 1981) and "Disturbing the Priest" (Born Again, 1983))	Butler, Ronnie James Dio, Ian Gillan, Iommi, Osbourne, Ward	Soilent Green	5:42

== Cancelled CD ==
The unreleased double CD compilation was intended to be a split release between Hydra Head and Relapse Records, with additional Sabbath covers provided by Goatsnake, Isis, Agoraphobic Nosebleed, Amber Asylum, Drowningman, and The Dillinger Escape Plan. Goatsnake's cover of "Who Are You" was instead included on a repress of the Dog Days EP; Isis' cover of "Hand of Doom" was included on the Sawblade EP; Amber Asylum's cover of "Black Sabbath" was included on The Supernatural Parlour Collection; The Dillinger Escape Plan's cover of "Paranoid" was included on a reissue of the Under the Running Board EP.
