= Blue Blood =

Blue Blood, bluebloods, blue blood, or, blue-blooded, may refer to:

== Societal categories ==
- Nobility, a social class
- Police, sometimes referred to as bluebloods

== Blood ==
- Hemolymph, circulatory fluid colored blue by hemocyanin, a respiratory protein evident in most molluscs and some arthropods
- Venous blood, on blood circulation diagrams, using blue colored veins
- Deoxygenated blood, when hemoglobin is laden with carbon dioxide and not oxygen, conceptually labelled as blue blood

== People and characters ==
- Andrew "Blueblood" McMahon (1926–1984), American blues musician

=== Fictional characters ===
- Prince Blueblood, a character from My Little Pony
- Blueblood, a fictional rapper from the 2022 Atlanta episode "The Most Atlanta"

== Places ==
- Coal Harbour, Vancouver, British Columbia, Canada; a neighbourhood also known as "Blueblood Alley"
- Blueblood Steakhouse, Casa Loma, Toronto, Ontario, Canada
- Blue Blood Brewing, Lincoln, Nebraska, USA; see List of breweries in Nebraska

== Groups, organizations, companies ==
- Bluebloods, the jazz backing band of Mike Henderson
- Blue Blood (also spelled "Blue Blud"), a successor band to Trespass (band)

=== Fictional ===
- Bluebloods, a fictional military unit from Warhammer 40K from the milieu of Gaunt's Ghosts
- Blue Blood, a fictional coven from Blue Bloods (novel series)

== Arts, entertainment, media ==
- Blue Bloods, 2010 American TV police drama series on CBS
- Blue Blood, a play by Georgia Douglas Johnson

=== Film ===
- Blue Blood (1914 film), Italian silent drama film
- Blue Blood (1925 film), silent film
- Blue Blood (1951 film), American film
- Blue Blood (1973 film), British horror film directed by Andrew Sinclair
- Blue Blood (2006 film), a documentary film directed by Stevan Riley
- If I Didn't Care (film), also released as Blue Blood, a 2007 American mystery film
- Blue Blood (2014 film), Brazilian film
- Kingsman: The Blue Blood, a future film, a planned sequel to Kingsman: The Golden Circle

=== Literature ===
- Blue Bloods (novel series), a series of vampire novels by Melissa de la Cruz, and the first book in the series from 2006
- Blue Blood, a 1997 detective novel by Stevan Eldred-Grigg
- Bluebloods, a 1990 novel by David Drake
- "BlueBlood", an anthology chapter of the serial manga comic Rising Stars of Manga
- Blue Blood, a 1989 non-fiction book about Rebekah Harkness by Craig Unger
- Blue Blood, a 2004 non-fiction book by Edward Conlon about his time as a police officer

=== Music ===
- Blue Blood Tour, a 1989 concert tour by X Japan in support of their eponymous album Blue Blood

==== Albums ====
- Blue Blood (X Japan album), 1989; and its title track song
- Blue Blood (James Blood Ulmer album), 2001
- Blue Blood, a 2002 album by 'Today Is the Day'
- Blue Blood, a 2015 album by 'W-inds'
- Blueblood (album), a 1998 album by Silkworm
- Blue Blood, an EP by Atrocity

==== Songs ====
- "Bluebloods", a song from the stage musical Kiss of the Spider Woman (musical)
- "Blue Blood", a 1989 song by X Japan, the title track off the eponymous album Blue Blood
- "Blue Blood", a 2010 song and single by Foals off the album Total Life Forever
- "Blue Blood", a 2023 song by Ive from I've Ive
- "The Blue Blooded", a 2006 song by Hilltop Hoods off the album The Hard Road

== Sports ==
- Blue Bloods (professional wrestling), a wrestling stable from World Championship Wrestling in the 1990s and early 2000s
- Blue bloods (college basketball), NCAA Division 1 basketball programs in the U.S.A.

== See also ==
- Blue (disambiguation)
- Blood (disambiguation)
