= On the Lam =

On the Lam may refer to:

- On the lam or "on the run", slang for the status of someone who is a fugitive
- On the Lam (album), a 2001 album by Cavity
- "On the Lam" (song), a 2010 song by Kele Okereke
- "On the Lam" (Adventure Time), an episode of Adventure Time
