= Northern Failures =

Studio album by Cable
- Released: 2001
- Genre: Metalcore
- Label: Hydra Head Records (CD) (HH666-56)
- Producer: Steve Austin

Cable chronology
Gutter Queen (1999)	Northern Failures (2001)	Skyhorse Jams (2001)

Professional ratings
Review scores
Source	Rating
Rock Sound	4/5 stars

Northern Failures is an album by American metal band Cable, released in 2001 by Hydra Head Records. The album was produced by Steve Austin of Today Is The Day, the first of three releases he would produce for the group, and the band's last record for Hydra Head Records. "Can't You See" is Marshall Tucker Band cover. According to drummer Vic Szalaj, much of the album, from its title to the lyrics, were inspired by a 10-day trip he and bassist/vocalist Randy Larsen took to the White Mountains in New Hampshire.

== Track listing ==
All tracks written by Cable except #11.

1. "Wings of Hope" – 2:50
2. "The Big Rock" – 2:54
3. "Climb the Cactus" – 6:25
4. "Irish Tan" – 3:24
5. "The City Dump" – 2:34
6. "Black Leather Mustache" – 3:10
7. "Fours and Whores" – 1:59
8. "Happy Accidents" – 4:57
9. "Whiskey Mountain Mantra" – 4:19
10. "Homewrecker" – 5:13
11. "Can't You See" – 5:14

== Personnel ==
- Randy Larsen - vocals, bass
- Bernie Romanowski - guitar
- Vic Szalaj - drums
