= Cavity (band) =

American sludge metal band

- Origin: Miami, Florida, U.S.
- Genres: Sludge metal
- Years active: 1992–2003, 2015–present
- Labels: Valley King, Hydra Head, Rhetoric, Bacteria Sour, Man's Ruin, City of Crime
- Members: Daniel Gorostiaga; Rene Barge; Ed Matus; Andrew McLees; Patrick Forrest
- Past members: Raf Luna; Juan Montoya; Steve Brooks; Anthony Vialon; Ryan Weinstein; Jason Lederman; Beatriz Monteavaro; Henry Wilson; Jason Landrian; Jorge Alvarez; Buddha; Rick Smith; Bryan Adams

Cavity is an American sludge metal band from Miami, Florida. They first formed in 1992, releasing a multitude of albums and singles before breaking up in 2003. Steve Brooks and Juan Montoya would go on to play in Torche and Floor. Anthony Vialon, Henry Wilson and Beatriz Monteavaro also played in Floor. Jason Landrian went on to form Black Cobra.

In 2015, the group reunited and toured the United States for the first time since their dissolution. The group issued their first album since their reunion, titled After Death, through Valley King in 2017.

== Discography ==
=== Studio albums ===
- Human Abjection (1995, City of Crime)
- Somewhere Between the Train Station and the Dumping Grounds (1997, Rhetoric)
- SuperCollider (1999, Man's Ruin)
- On the Lam (2001, Hydra Head)
- After Death (2017, Valley King)
- Wraith (2019, Valley King)

=== Singles and EPs ===
- Cavity demo tape (1992, self-released)
- Scalpel 7-inch (1996, City of Crime)
- Crawling 7-inch (1996, Bacteria Sour)
- Goin' Ann Arbor 7-inch (1996, Rhetoric)
- Sourflower/Damaged III split 7-inch with Daisycutter (1996, Starcrunch)
- Fuck Diablo 7-inch (1997, Arm)
- Wounded 7-inch (1998, No!)
- In These Black Days Volume 4 split 2×7″ with Cable, Jesuit, and Overcast (1998, Hydra Head)
- Laid Insignificant CD (1999, Bacteria Sour) (reissued through Hydra Head in 2008)
- Live split 2×7″ with Bongzilla (1998, Rhetoric)

=== Compilation albums ===
- Drowning (1996, Bacteria Sour)
- Miscellaneous Recollections 92-97 (2001, Kapow)
