= Animal Mother =

Animal Mother may refer to:

- Animal Mother, a character in the 1987 film Full Metal Jacket
- Animal Mother (album), a 2014 album by Today Is the Day
