= We Sold Our Soul for Rock 'n' Roll =

Compilation album by Black Sabbath
- Released: January 1976
- Recorded: 1969–1975
- Genre: Heavy metal
- Length: 90:35
- Labels: NEMS (UK); Vertigo (Europe); Warner Bros. (US/Canada)
- Producers: Rodger Bain; Mike Butcher; Patrick Meehan; Black Sabbath

Black Sabbath chronology
Sabotage (1975)	We Sold Our Soul for Rock 'n' Roll (1976)	Technical Ecstasy (1976)

We Sold Our Soul for Rock 'n' Roll is a compilation album by the English heavy metal band Black Sabbath, originally released in January 1976 in the UK and 3 February 1976 in the US.

== Album information ==
When Black Sabbath signed with NEMS, the label which would release their 1975 album Sabotage in the UK, NEMS acquired the band's back catalogue and wasted little time compiling this release. Authorized without the band's awareness by their previous manager, Patrick Meehan, the band would make no money whatsoever from the release. Although the band had six studio albums to its name at this point, this compilation drew heavily on the first four albums: this would also be a feature of most of the Osbourne-era compilations later released.

The original UK gatefold album, with a matte finish, featured a woman in a coffin holding what looks like a tin foil cross. Additionally, the original record retained Geezer Butler's bass solo before "N.I.B.", but this would be edited from later issues. Some US copies of the LP do not actually include "Wicked World" on the label or on the record itself, though it does appear on the cover. In the UK, "Wicked World" had been only a B-side and was relatively obscure.

Despite the album being an official release, Iommi has been quoted as saying that the first time the band knew of it was when asked to autograph copies which fans presented after concerts.

== Reception ==
Professional ratings
Review scores
Source	Rating
AllMusic	4.5/5 stars
Robert Christgau	(C)
The Rolling Stone Album Guide	4/5 stars

It was certified Silver in the UK by the BPI on 1 October 1976. In the US the RIAA certified the album as Gold on 7 February 1980, Platinum on 13 May 1986 and 2x Multi-Platinum (generally known as 'Double Platinum' outside the offices of the RIAA) on 16 March 2000.

== Track listing ==
All tracks are written by Ozzy Osbourne, Tony Iommi, Geezer Butler, and Bill Ward, except where noted.

Side A
No.	Title	Writer(s)	Original release	Length
1.	"Black Sabbath"		1970 ~ Black Sabbath	6:20
2.	"The Wizard"		1970 ~ Black Sabbath	4:22
3.	"Warning"	Aynsley Dunbar; Alex Dmochowski; Victor Hickling; John Moorshead	1970 ~ Black Sabbath	10:30

Side B
No.	Title	Original release	Length
4.	"Paranoid"	1970 ~ Paranoid	2:45
5.	"War Pigs"	1970 ~ Paranoid	7:55
6.	"Iron Man"	1970 ~ Paranoid	5:47
7.	"Wicked World"	1970 ~ [Non album B Side single]	4:35

Side C
No.	Title	Original release	Length
8.	"Tomorrow's Dream"	1972 ~ Vol. 4	3:06
9.	"Fairies Wear Boots"	1970 ~ Paranoid	6:07
10.	"Changes"	1972 ~ Vol. 4	4:41
11.	"Sweet Leaf"	1971 ~ Master of Reality	5:02
12.	"Children of the Grave"	1971 ~ Master of Reality	5:15

Side D
No.	Title	Original release	Length
13.	"Sabbath Bloody Sabbath"	1973 ~ Sabbath Bloody Sabbath	5:43
14.	"Am I Going Insane (Radio)"	1975 ~ Sabotage	4:20
15.	"Laguna Sunrise"	1972 ~ Vol. 4	2:49
16.	"Snowblind"	1972 ~ Vol. 4	5:25
17.	"N.I.B."	1970 ~ Black Sabbath	5:51

== Personnel ==
- Ozzy Osbourne – vocals, harmonica
- Tony Iommi – guitars, piano, mellotron on "Changes", synthesiser on "Children of the Grave" and "Am I Going Insane (Radio)", cough on "Sweet Leaf"
- Geezer Butler – bass, mellotron on "Changes"
- Bill Ward – drums, percussion

== Charts ==
Chart (1976)	Peak position
Canada Top Albums/CDs (RPM)	40
Swedish Albums (Sverigetopplistan)	21
UK Albums (Official Charts)	35
US Billboard 200	48

Chart (1998–1999)	Peak position
UK Independent Albums (Official Charts)	33
UK Rock & Metal Albums (Official Charts)	15

== Certifications ==
Region	Certification	Certified units/sales
United Kingdom (BPI)	Gold	100,000^{‡}
United States (RIAA)	2× Platinum	2,000,000^{^}
^{^} Shipments figures based on certification alone.^{‡} Sales+streaming figures based on certification alone.

== Release history ==
Region	Date	Label
United Kingdom	January 1976	NEMS
United States	3 February 1976	Warner Bros. Records
Canada	1976	Warner Bros. Records
United Kingdom	1996	Castle Communications
United Kingdom	2004	Sanctuary Records
