= Warlord (hardcore band) =

American metal band

- Origin: Portland, Oregon, U.S.
- Genres: Doom metal; hardcore punk; noise rock
- Years active: 1997–1999, 2015
- Label: Solid State
- Past members: Ricky Rodgers; Brian Fletcher; Phil Smith; Tim Henderson

Warlord was an American band whose sound was described as "doomcore", a mix between doom metal and hardcore punk. Formed in 1997, Warlord was signed to Solid State Records during their brief existence. Before disbanding, the band did a tour with fellow Solid State band, Training for Utopia. The band has a compilation coming out, to help drummer Timothy Henderson with his health problems. The compilation has a new song and an unreleased track from Rock the Foe Hammer.

In their tenure, the band released an EP, titled Warlord, and a debut album Rock the Foe Hammer, both of which came out through Solid State.

== Members ==
Last known lineup

- Ricky Rodgers – vocals, lead guitar (1997–1999, 2015) (formerly of Fuse of Ire and Catechuman)
- Phil Smith – bass (1998–1999, 2015) (World Against World)
- Timothy Henderson – drums, backing vocals (1997–1999, 2015) (formerly of Mr. Bishop's Fist and Catechuman)

Fill-in musicians

- Jonathon Ford – bass, backing vocals (1997–1998) (formerly of Roadside Monument, Catechuman and Mr. Bishop's Fist)

Former

- Brian Fletchner – rhythm guitar, backing vocals (1997–1998) (Pilgrims, AAPOAA)

Timeline

== Discography ==
EPs

- Warlord (1997; Solid State)

Studio album

- Rock the Foe Hammer (1999; Solid State)

Compilation appearances

- "Set Sail to the Kingdom" on We Bear the Scars (2017)
