= Gutter Queen =

Studio album by Cable
- Released: 1999
- Genre: Metalcore
- Length: 45:03
- Label: Hydra Head Records (CD) (HH666-26)
- Producer: Jeff Caxide

Cable chronology
Cable (1997)	Gutter Queen (1999)	Northern Failures (2001)

Gutter Queen is an album by Cable, released in 1999 by Hydra Head Records. The album was produced by Jeff Caxide, the group's original bass player.

== Track listing ==
All tracks written by Cable, except "Planet Caravan", originally written by Black Sabbath.

1. "The Sunday Dinner" – 5:45
2. "Not Today I'm Not" – 6:16
3. "Clinton St. Blues" – 2:47
4. "Human Interest Story" – 2:53
5. "Work Related Injury" – 4:19
6. "Long Distance Dedication" – 3:46
7. "Both Barrels" – 5:11
8. "Dot. Com." – 2:13
9. [Silence] – 4:29
10. [Silence] – 0:04
11. "Planet Caravan" – 2:50
12. [Silence] – 0:24
