= Am I Going Insane (Radio) =

Song by Black Sabbath

- cover art for Japanese release

Single by Black Sabbath

from the album Sabotage
- B-side: "Hole in the Sky"
- Released: 13 February 1976
- Recorded: Morgan Studios in London, England
- Genre: Psychedelia; rock
- Length: 4:17
- Label: Vertigo
- Songwriters: Ozzy Osbourne; Tony Iommi; Geezer Butler; Bill Ward

Black Sabbath singles chronology
| "Sabbath Bloody Sabbath" (1974) | "Am I Going Insane (Radio)" (1976) | "Never Say Die!" (1978) |

"Am I Going Insane (Radio)" is a single by the English heavy metal band Black Sabbath from the 1975 album Sabotage. Although common conception is that the suffix "Radio" was said to be added to the title because it was made for the purpose of being played on the radio, drummer Bill Ward said that it was Cockney rhyming slang for "mental"—radio-rental. Critics have noted the coincidence of the title and the fact that all Black Sabbath members except Tony Iommi were later clinically depressed. Also, as the song fades, there is a disturbing cry that sounds like someone going 'mental.' It has been theorized that the recording was of Jessica, Ozzy's daughter, but a 1975 interview with him suggests that it was not Jessica. The engineer for Sabotage revealed that it came from an unmarked cassette found at the studio.

== Disappointments within the band and reception ==
Although happy with most of the songs on Sabotage, lead singer Ozzy Osbourne did not like the responses he got with "Am I Going Insane (Radio)" or "Supertzar." Osbourne felt the two tracks were distractions on what would otherwise be a perfect album. AllMusic reviewers claimed that the song was unrecognizable for Black Sabbath and that it was a reckless attempt to change the band's identity. Despite Osbourne's feeling towards the song and negative reviews its popularity caused it to appear as the only track from Sabotage on Sabbath's greatest hits album We Sold Our Soul for Rock 'n' Roll.

== Track listing ==
A side

1. "Am I Going Insane (Radio)" – 4:17

B side

1. "Hole in the Sky" – 4:00
