= Sabbath Bloody Sabbath (song) =

Song by Black Sabbath

Single by Black Sabbath

from the album Sabbath Bloody Sabbath
- B-side: "Changes"
- Released: 26 October 1973
- Recorded: 1973
- Genre: Heavy metal
- Length: 5:45 (album version); 3:33 (single version)
- Label: WWA
- Songwriters: Ozzy Osbourne; Tony Iommi; Geezer Butler; Bill Ward
- Producer: Black Sabbath

Black Sabbath singles chronology
| "Tomorrow's Dream" (1972) | "Sabbath Bloody Sabbath" (1973) | "Am I Going Insane (Radio)" (1975) |

Music video
- "Sabbath Bloody Sabbath" on YouTube

"Sabbath Bloody Sabbath" is the opening title track of the English heavy metal band Black Sabbath's 1973 album of the same name.

Its main riff has been cited as "the riff that saved Black Sabbath" because Tony Iommi, who wrote most of the band's music, had been suffering from writer's block. They resorted to drastic measures (including renting out the supposedly haunted Clearwell Castle to live in) to inspire him.

The song has been singled out for praise by hard rock and heavy metal guitar players, with Slash from Guns N' Roses stating to Guitar World in 2008: "The outro to 'Sabbath Bloody Sabbath' is the heaviest shit I have ever heard in my life. To this day, I haven't heard anything as heavy that has as much soul." Brent Hinds, former Mastodon guitarist, told Nick Bowcott in 2008, "The 'dreams turn to nightmares, Heaven turns to Hell' riff at the end of that song is unbeatable."

== Live versions ==
The song was rarely played live in the 1970s. During the Heaven & Hell Tour, it was brought back for a number of shows, then dropped. On the Cross Purposes tour, it usually closed shows, while on the Forbidden tour, it was played in the middle of the setlist and featured additional guitar by Geoff Nicholls.

During the band's late-1990s Reunion tour, the song was played but shortened, skipping the final verse due to Osbourne's diminishing vocal range. During subsequent tours and live shows, the opening riff was played as an intro to "Paranoid".

== Personnel ==
Personnel taken from Sabbath Bloody Sabbath liner notes.

- Tony Iommi – guitars
- Ozzy Osbourne – vocals
- Bill Ward – drums, percussion
- Geezer Butler – bass, fuzz bass

== Covers ==
American thrash metal band Anthrax covered this song, and it is featured as track 3 of their 1987 EP I'm The Man.

Swedish pop band The Cardigans covered "Sabbath Bloody Sabbath" on their debut album Emmerdale.

Swedish doom metal band Candlemass covered part of the song for a Black Sabbath medley on their 1988 album Ancient Dreams. They later covered the whole song on their 2025 EP Black Star.

American noise rock / experimental metal band Today Is the Day covered the song; it was featured on volume three of the In These Black Days tribute series and on the band's fourth studio album, Temple of the Morning Star.

== Reception ==
"Sabbath Bloody Sabbath" was ranked the fourth best Black Sabbath song by Rock - Das Gesamtwerk der größten Rock-Acts im Check. Cash Box said it was a "heavy metal excursion into the hard rocking world of these highly successful British rockers" but that "softer breaks incorporated with the heavy make this track Black Sabbath's strongest single possibility in some time."
