= Hole in the Sky (song) =

Song by Black Sabbath

Song by Black Sabbath

from the album Sabotage
- Released: 28 July 1975
- Recorded: Early 1975
- Studio: Morgan Studios, London, United Kingdom
- Genre: Heavy metal
- Length: 3:59
- Label: Vertigo
- Songwriter(s): Geezer Butler; Tony Iommi; Ozzy Osbourne; Bill Ward
- Producer(s): Black Sabbath; Mike Butcher

"Hole in the Sky" is a song by the English heavy metal band Black Sabbath. It is the opening track on their sixth studio album, Sabotage, released in 1975.

== Composition ==
=== Musical structure ===
Author Mick Wall wrote that the song features a "door-slamming riff that wouldn't have been out of place on Paranoid" (the band's second album, released in 1970). Music scholar Nolan Stolz identifies three guitar riffs played by guitarist Tony Iommi in the song: a main riff, a second riff heard at both around 24 seconds and 58 seconds into the track ("similar to—and a logical outgrowth of—the first"), and a third, four-second-long riff present during the song's chorus after the first two verses. Stolz notes that the third riff "is based on a one-second-long rhythmic idea played four times, but with the chords changing on the third and fourth times." This is paired with drummer Bill Ward playing a tom drum and cymbal at both about 120 beats per minute (bpm) and 180 bpm, applying "an Afro-Cuban-like feel". After the fourth verse, the second riff is recalled, and the main riff is played three-and-a-half times before the song comes to an abrupt end.

Following the song's sudden cutoff, the album segues immediately into the next track, "Don't Start (Too Late)", an acoustic instrumental that runs for under a minute in length. Wall asserts that the abrupt ending of "Hole in the Sky" emphasises "the sheer anger of the song".

=== Vocals and lyrics ===
"Hole in the Sky" features vocals by Ozzy Osbourne. Author Mick Wall wrote that, in the song, "Ozzy rants and raves about going through a hole in the sky, 'seeing nowhere through the eyes of a lie.'" Philosopher and writer William Irwin characterizes the song as having themes of "cosmic travel" and "apocalyptic warfare".

Bassist and lyricist Geezer Butler described "Hole in the Sky" as being about pollution.

== Reception ==
In 2020, Joe DiVita and Eduardo Rivadavia of Loudwire ranked "Hole in the Sky" number 23 in their ranking of every Black Sabbath song from the era in which Osbourne was the band's vocalist. In 2021, Louder Sound's Paul Brannigan ranked the song number 19 on his list of the 40 best Black Sabbath songs, referring to the track as "a master class in straight-to-the-point metal."

== Personnel ==
- Ozzy Osbourne – vocals
- Tony Iommi – guitars
- Geezer Butler – bass guitar
- Bill Ward – drums, percussion
