= Scott Wexton =

American musician

- Born: Detroit, Michigan, U.S.
- Genres: Noise rock, post-hardcore, sludge metal
- Occupation: Musician
- Instruments: Keyboards, sampler, theremin, vocals
- Years active: 1991–present
- Formerly of: Batterie:Acid, Today Is the Day
- Website: voodooorganist.com

Scott Wexton, also known by his stage name Voodoo Organist, is an American vocalist and keyboardist. He has also served as a member of the noise rock/post-hardcore group Today Is the Day and as a founding member of the band Batterie:Acid. Since 2001, he has recorded solo work and performed under the name Voodoo Organist.

== Biography ==
Scott Wexton was born in Detroit, Michigan and began playing the organ at the age of ten as a Catholic altar boy. He started Tribe in Detroit with percussionist Christopher Gwizdala in 1991. The duo expanded its membership to five members and became Batterie:Acid in 1992. Their releases were limited to several hundred pressings on cassette tape. The group dissolved in 1995 and Wexton moved to Nashville where he was recruited to play the sampler in Today Is the Day with singer/guitarist Steve Austin and drummer Brad Elrod. He recorded an album with them, the self-titled Today Is the Day released in 1996. The following year, he and Elrod collaborated on a project known as Trance End.

In 2001, Wexton had a near death experience when he began bleeding internally and was rushed to the emergency room, where he was diagnosed with Crohn's disease. The episode affected Wexton, who became aware of his own mortality and his need to express his individual musical creativity. He quit his day job and began a solo musical project called Voodoo Organist, booking two consecutive tours for himself and composing an album's worth of material.

== Discography ==
Year	Artist	Album	Label
1993	Batterie:Acid	Atazir	Anathemus
1994	Batterie:Acid	re:evolution now•here	Anathemus
1996	Today Is the Day	Today Is the Day	Amphetamine Reptile
2002	Voodoo Organist	Exotic Demonic Blues	Witch Doctor
2003	Voodoo Organist	The Return of the Voodoo Organist	Dead Teenager
2005	Voodoo Organist	Holy Ghost Town	Dead Teenager
2006	Voodoo Organist	The Serpent Dance	Voodoo Man Music
2008	Voodoo Organist	This Burning Hell	Voodoo Man Music
2008	Voodoo Organist	Darwin Dance Hall Days	Voodoo Man Music
2012	Voodoo Organist	Organeddon!	Voodoo Man Music
2013	Voodoo Organist	Vampire Empire	Voodoo Man Music
