= On the Lam (album) =

Studio album by Cavity
- Released: 23 October 2001
- Recorded: December 2000
- Studios: Dungeon Studios, North Miami, Florida
- Genre: Sludge metal
- Length: 52:11
- Label: Hydra Head Records
- Producers: Cavity & Jeremy Du Bois

Cavity chronology
SuperCollider (1999)	On the Lam (2004)	After Death (2017)

On the Lam is the third studio album by American sludge metal band Cavity released on 23 October 2001 on the Hydra Head Records label. The album was recorded during the month of December 2000 at Dungeon Studios in the band's home state of Florida and was produced by the band and Jeremy Du Bois. The album was well received by music critics with some calling it their most accessible album to date and Eduardo Rivadavia of AllMusic went so far as to call the album "remarkable".

== Composition and reception ==
On the Lam is essentially sludge metal and the band makes extensive use of guitar feedback which was described as a musical theme across the album. AllMusic's Eduardo Rivadavia went on to say of the album: "they don't so much compose music as harness feedback, their songs are barely cognizant of traditional rock & roll structures and utterly ignorant of commercial aspirations, comprising a gloriously disorganized whole." He concluded his review with "A dense, difficult work to digest, On the Lam leaves a lasting first impression nonetheless, for lovers of unpredictable, unorthodox, and of course extremely heavy music."

In a March 2002 Exclaim! review, Chris Ayers described the album as "more groove-based but no less heavy" while band founder and bassist Daniel Gorostiaga explained in the review that this was the first album where all band members contributed to the writing and composition process saying "It's really the first time we've done that so effectively; basically on albums like Laid Insignificant, I wrote most of the music." Discussing Cavity and On the Lam's similarities to Eyehategod, Gorostiaga said "Eyehategod are more popular than us, but I do recognize the comparisons because we both came from the same roots of punk/hardcore and metal."

Professional ratings
Review scores
Source	Rating
Allmusic	4.5/5 stars
Sputnikmusic	4.7/5

== Track listing ==
No.	Title	Length
1.	"Cult Exciter"	8:33
2.	"Boxing the Hog"	4:06
3.	"Sung From a Goad"	3:05
4.	"Pulling Up the Stakes"	7:33
5.	"Willy Williams"	3:59
6.	"On the Lam"	6:45
7.	"Leave Me Up"	7:18
8.	"Sweat and Swagger"	5:30
9.	"9"	5:22
Total length:		52:11

== Personnel ==
Cavity

- Rene Barge – vocals
- Ryan Wienstein – guitar & piano
- Jason Landrian – guitar
- Daniel Gorostiaga – bass guitar
- Jorge Alvarez – drums

Technical personnel

- Cavity & Jeremy Du Bois – production
- Jeremy Du Bois – engineering
- Art concept by Cavity
- Design and construction by A. Turner with assistance from J. Hellmann
- Original photos by Benjamin Carrillo
