= Blue bloods (college basketball) =

Elite teams of US college basketball

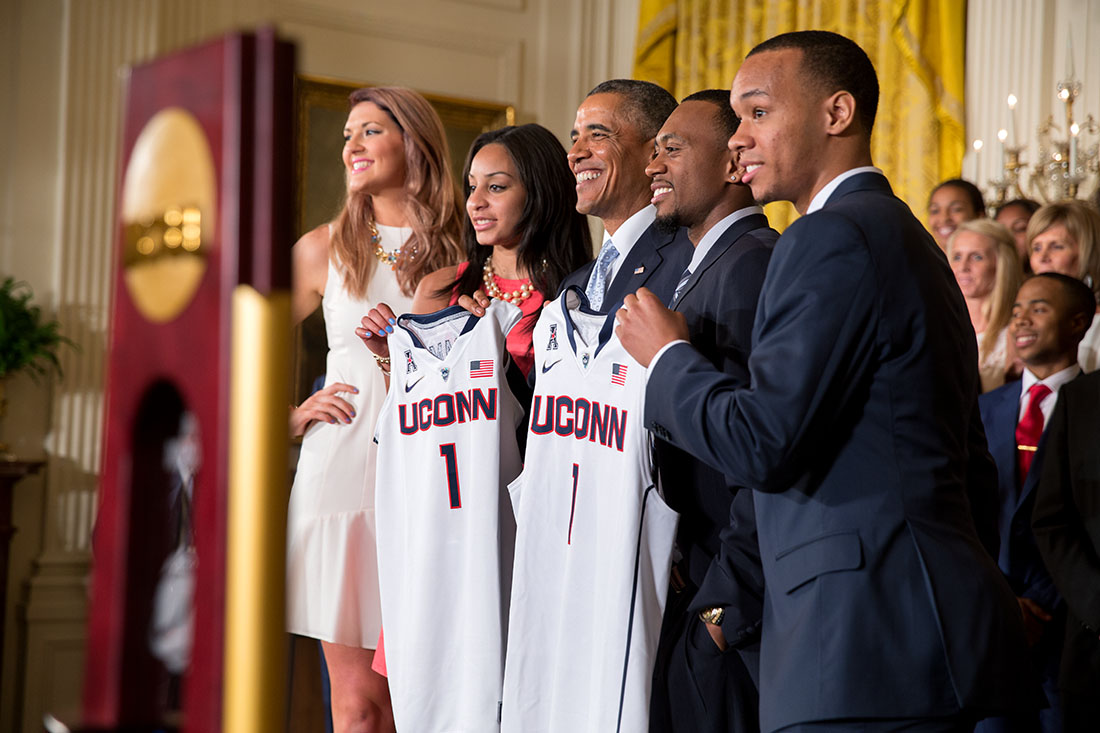
Members of both the UConn Huskies men's and women's basketball teams at the White House after each team won NCAA championships in 2014

In American college basketball, blue bloods refers to National Collegiate Athletic Association (NCAA) Division I basketball programs considered to be among the most elite, either contemporaneously or historically. Outside of sports, blue blood is used as an alternative term for nobility.

Basketball media writers often debate which men's programs are considered blue bloods. The men's programs of Duke, Indiana, Kansas, Kentucky, UCLA, UNC, and UConn are often included when listing blue bloods. For women's basketball, UConn and Tennessee are often listed.

== Origins and definition of the phrase ==
The term "blue blood" or being "blue-blooded" is rooted in nobility, with royals being dubbed as such. The modern-day usage referring to an exclusive list of elite college basketball programs has an unclear history. Writing for NCAA.com, Andy Wittry cited a January 3, 1927, sub-headline in the Brooklyn Times-Union as the "oldest example" he could find of the phrase being used. However, the Times-Union's sub-headline of "Centrals Made Up of Basketball Blue Bloods" referred to players rather than teams. The phrase was also featured in The Indianapolis News on March 9, 1942. The oldest usage of the phrase in specific reference to college basketball was used by Dick Dunkel of The Charlotte News, who used "blue bloods" in his men's basketball rating system. During the 1950s, the Associated Press (AP) and Cincinnati Enquirer used the phrase in a casual sense, describing teams ranked near the top of the AP poll.

When writing about its modern-day usage, Dana O'Neil of The Athletic wrote that "the term blue blood is, in fact, nebulous and left to the eye of the beholder, the standards of neither admission nor eviction not exactly clear. Tradition and success seem to matter but how deep that success has to go is also subject to interpretation." It has also been noted that the teams with most widespread consideration as blue bloods all wear shades of blue.

== Schools considered blue bloods ==
=== Men's basketball ===
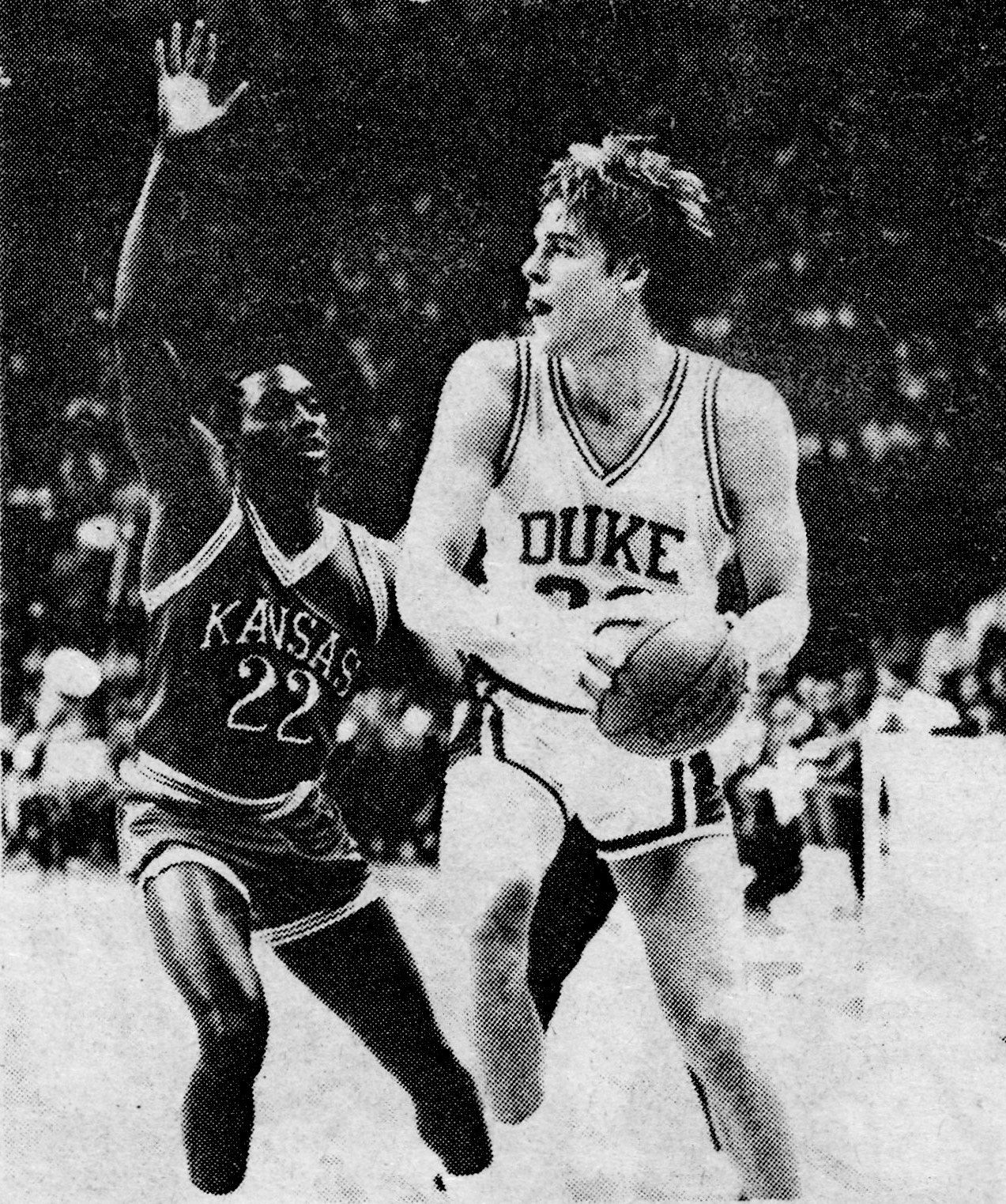
Cedric Hunter of Kansas defending Mark Alarie of Duke. Their two teams are widely considered firm blue bloods.

There is debate among which teams should be considered blue bloods. Duke, Kansas, Kentucky, North Carolina (UNC), UCLA and Indiana have historically been the schools most often written about by sports media when discussing blue bloods. Sports media writers generally consider these schools among the best due to being among the winningest teams in the regular season, as well as having won a considerable amount of championships. UCLA and Indiana are sometimes excluded from lists of blue bloods, or have had their status as a blue blood program called into question. This is due to the majority of their success and championships coming under one coach or occurring during one particular stretch. In 2022, Will Backus of 247Sports noted that Indiana's inclusion on listings of blue bloods has become more "tenuous" in recent years. The blue blood status for Duke, Kansas, Kentucky, and UNC have a wider consensus. Writing for Sports Illustrated's FanNation in 2021, Davis Wallace described UCLA and Indiana as "True Bloods", also dubbing Michigan State and UConn as such, stating that these schools "aren't consistent enough to be considered a top-tier Blue Blood, but they still have a history that's respected." Wallace also listed Virginia, Gonzaga, Villanova, and Michigan as "New Bloods" due to their then more recent success.

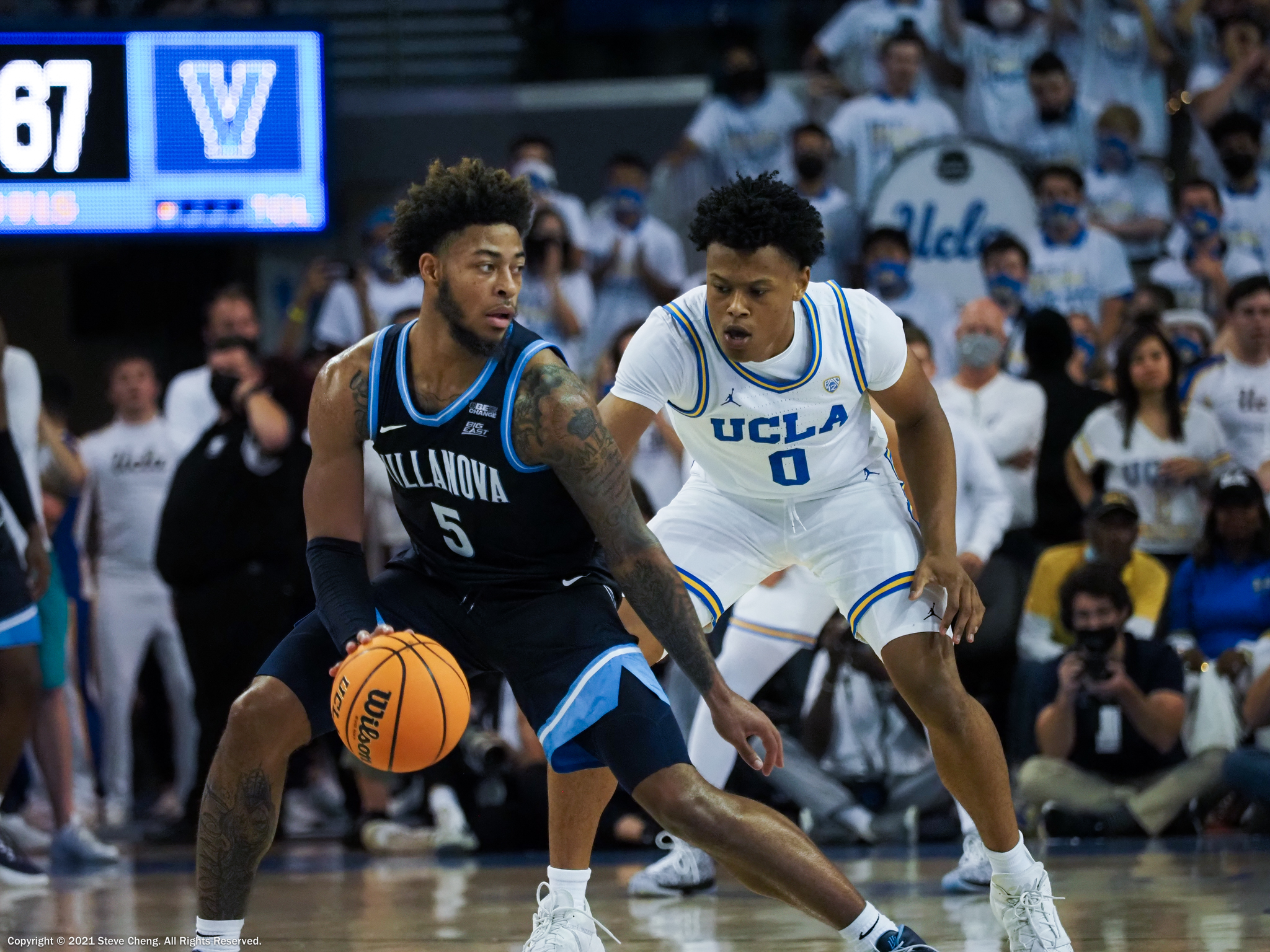
Justin Moore of Villanova being defended by Jaylen Clark of UCLA. Their two teams are often debated as blue bloods.

From 2016 to 2025, UConn, Villanova, and Florida won a combined five of the nine championships during the decade, (Note: The COVID-19 pandemic led to the cancellation of the 2020 tournament.) with their wins giving all of them three or more each in their respective school histories and leading to their assessments for blue blood status by sportswriters. UConn were already sometimes thought of as a blue blood prior to their championship wins in the 2020s. The program gained much consideration as a bona fide blue blood among many media writers and fans alike following their 2023 championship, and when they secured a title in the following tournament as well, media writers were in even more agreement about the program's blue blood status. O'Neil wrote that "Maybe UConn's delayed entry [into blue blood membership] is due to the fact that the Huskies don't quite fit the mold. The Huskies are more feisty than refined," adding that "they also read more blue-collar than blue-blooded." Following UConn's 2024 tournament victory, Matt Norlander of CBS Sports wrote that "Last year was about UConn cementing its case as a blue blood. It was so convincing, you never heard it brought up this season or this tournament. It was accepted as fact. Because it is." Villanova's Final Four and championship game appearances in the 2010s and 2020s also garnered them consideration for blue blood status. When Duke, Kansas, UNC, and Villanova all made the Final Four in the 2022 NCAA tournament, numerous basketball media writers discussed the occasion as the first time all Final Four teams were blue bloods. As they won the 2025 championship, their third in school history, the Florida Gators also began to garner some consideration as a potential blue blood.

=== Women's basketball ===
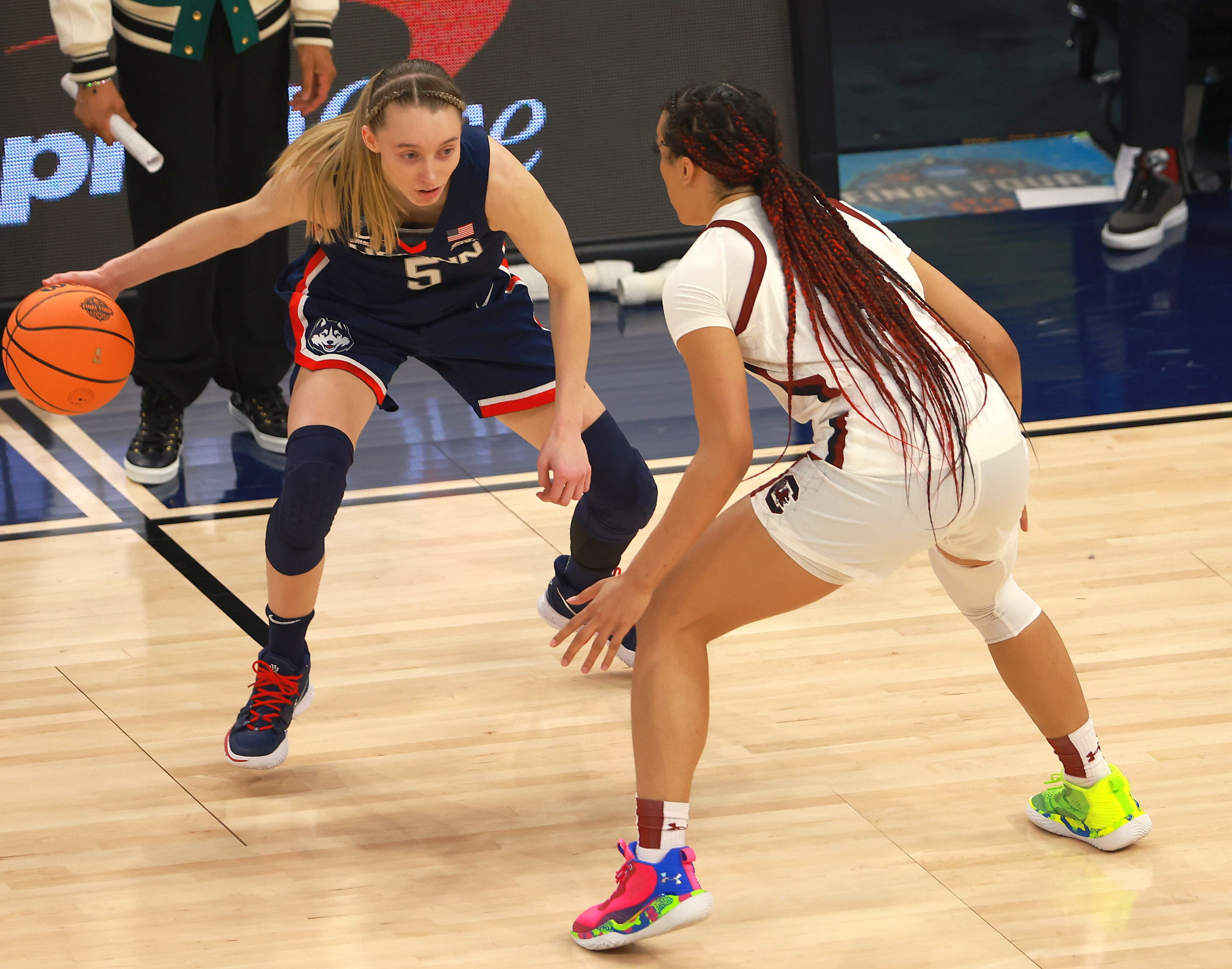
Paige Bueckers of UConn being guarded by Brea Beal of South Carolina in the 2022 national championship game.

The term has less usage in regards to college women's basketball. However, UConn's women's team is widely considered a blue blood, having won 12 NCAA championships mainly in the 2000s and 2010s, all under head coach Geno Auriemma. Stanford and Tennessee have also historically "reigned supreme" in the women's side, earning blue blood consideration. The latter won eight titles under head coach Pat Summitt from the 1980s through the 2000s. In the mid-2010s, South Carolina began to emerge as a successful program under head coach Dawn Staley; their three championships and eight Final Four appearances since 2015 have led to blue blood consideration from sportswriters.
