= Temple of the Morning Star =

1997 studio album by Today Is the Day

Studio album by Today Is the Day
- Released: September 23, 1997
- Recorded: July 1997
- Studio: Austin Enterprise, Nashville, Tennessee
- Genre: Noise rock; avant-garde metal; alternative metal; post-hardcore
- Length: 57:16
- Label: Relapse
- Producer: Steve Austin

Today Is the Day chronology
Today Is the Day (1996)	Temple of the Morning Star (1997)	In the Eyes of God (1999)

Professional ratings
Review scores
Source	Rating
AllMusic	4/5 stars
Chronicles of Chaos	9/10
Collector's Guide to Heavy Metal	8/10
Kerrang!	4/5 stars

Temple of the Morning Star is the fourth studio album by the American noisecore band Today Is the Day, released on September 23, 1997, by Relapse Records. Since its release in 1997, the album has garnered much praise from critics and is considered to be one of the band's best albums. The album was reissued twice, first in 2006 on CD formats, and again in 2017 to celebrate its 20th anniversary. In 2017, the album was included in Decibel magazine's "Hall of Fame" list.

== Background, production, and release ==
By 1996, after the release of the group's self-titled album, Amphetamine Reptile Records began to slow down due to financial reasons. Thus, the band signed onto Relapse Records. At this point, drummer and founding member Brad Elrod, as well as keyboardist Scott Wexton, left the band. To replace them, frontman Steve Austin gained drummer Mike Hyde and keyboardist/bassist Christopher Reeser.

The album was recorded in July 1997 at Austin's Austin Enterprise studio, and was released through Relapse on September 23, 1997, on CD and LP formats. The LP edition was limited to 1000 copies that included a track list that differed from the CD release, with "Satan Is Alive" being placed before "Crutch" and the removal of "I See You" entirely. The album was subsequently reissued on October 17, 2006, on CD format, this time with expanded liner notes written by Austin.

According to the 2006 CD reissue liner notes, Austin was very poor at the time of the album's recording and lived in an abandoned warehouse. On March 24, 2017, to celebrate the album's 20th anniversary, The End Records reissued a remastered edition of the album on double LP and double CD sets. To promote this re-release, a music video for the track "Blindspot" was produced. The video acts as a mockery of cable TV news.

== Touring ==
The band embarked on a tour to support the album. By 1998, Hyde left the group while the band was still touring. To fill in, Elrod briefly rejoined the band to help complete the rest of the shows they scheduled. One of these shows with Elrod, which was performed at the Whisky a Go Go in 1998, was released as a video download in 2008 through Austin's independent label SuperNova Records. A DVD edition of this live show was released as part of the 20th anniversary double CD set, and the audio from the show was released on the double LP edition.

To promote the 20th Anniversary reissue, the band announced a US tour in which they will perform the entire album each show during the month of July. Kayo Dot will join them for the tour. The band also announced via their official Facebook page that a second leg will be made of the tour for the month of August.

== Track listing ==
All tracks are written by Steve Austin.

No.	Title	Length
1.	"Temple of the Morning Star"	2:51
2.	"The Man Who Loves to Hurt Himself"	4:06
3.	"Blindspot"	1:49
4.	"High as the Sky"	2:13
5.	"Miracle"	2:32
6.	"Kill Yourself"	3:15
7.	"Mankind"	2:41
8.	"Pinnacle"	1:37
9.	"Crutch"	1:16
10.	"Root of All Evil"	3:48
11.	"Satan Is Alive"	2:59
12.	"Rabid Lassie"	2:52
13.	"Friend for Life"	0:25
14.	"My Life with You"	2:33
15.	"I See You"	2:59
16.	"Hermaphrodite"	8:19
17.	"Temple of the Morning Star" (features an unlisted cover of "Sabbath Bloody Sabbath")	10:55

2017 remastered edition bonus tracks
No.	Title	Length
18.	"Miracle" (demo)	2:28
19.	"Pinnacle" (demo)	1:43
20.	"Sabbath Bloody Sabbath" (demo)	5:25
21.	"Temple of the Morning Star" (acoustic demo)	2:18
Total length:		69:10

2017 remastered edition bonus DVD (Live at the Whiskey A Go-Go 1997)
No.	Title	Length
1.	"Crutch"	5:01
2.	"High as the Sky"	2:16
3.	"Pinnacle"	1:49
4.	"Hermaphrodite"	6:06
5.	"Kai Piranha"	1:54
6.	"Bugs (Death March)"	4:57
7.	"Willpower"	3:55
8.	"My First Knife"	3:19
9.	"The Man Who Loves to Hurt Himself"	3:28
10.	"Blindspot"	1:46
11.	"Miracle"	2:23
Total length:		36:59

== Accolades ==
Year	Publication	Country	Accolade	Rank
2000	Terrorizer	United Kingdom	"Albums of the Year"	7
2011	Terrorizer	United Kingdom	"Top 21 Relapse Records"	5
"*" denotes an unordered list.

== Personnel ==
Adapted from the Temple of the Morning Star liner notes.

Today Is the Day

- Steve Austin – vocals, guitar, sampler, production
- Mike Hyde – drums, percussion
- Christopher Reeser – bass guitar, sampler

Production and design

- Matthew F. Jacobson – executive production
- Joe Kimball – cover art
- Dave Shirk – mastering
- William J. Yurkiewicz Jr. – executive production

== Release history ==
Region	Date	Label	Format	Catalog
United States	September 23, 1997	Relapse	CD, LP	RR 6964
United States	October 17, 2006	Relapse	CD	RR 6613
United States	March 24, 2017	The End	2CD, 2LP	TE 731
