= Sabotage (Black Sabbath album) =

1975 studio album by Black Sabbath

Studio album by Black Sabbath
- Released: 28 July 1975
- Recorded: February–March 1975
- Studio: Morgan (London)
- Genres: Heavy metal; progressive metal
- Length: 43:37
- Labels: NEMS (UK); Vertigo (Europe); Warner Bros. (US)
- Producers: Black Sabbath; Mike Butcher

Black Sabbath chronology
Sabbath Bloody Sabbath (1973)	Sabotage (1975)	We Sold Our Soul for Rock 'n' Roll (1976)

Singles from Sabotage
- 1. "Am I Going Insane (Radio)" Released: 13 February 1976

Sabotage is the sixth studio album by the English heavy metal band Black Sabbath, released on 28 July 1975. The album was recorded in the midst of a legal battle with the band's former manager, Patrick Meehan. The stress that resulted from the band's ongoing legal woes infiltrated the recording process, inspiring the album's title. It was co-produced by guitarist Tony Iommi and Mike Butcher.

A continuation of the band's experimentation from the previous two albums, Sabotage mixes the band's usual heaviness with experimental offerings, incorporating acoustic guitar and choirs.

Like the album preceding it, Sabbath Bloody Sabbath, the album initially received positive reviews and attained commercial success. However, it became the band's first release to not be certified platinum in the United States. Like its predecessors, the album continues to receive acclaim as a classic album in the band's discography.

== Background ==
Black Sabbath began work on their sixth album in February 1975, again in England, at Morgan Studios in Willesden, London. The title Sabotage was chosen because the band was at the time being sued by their former management and felt they were being "sabotaged all the way along the line and getting punched from all sides", according to Iommi. "It was probably the only album ever made with lawyers in the studio," said drummer Bill Ward. Iommi credits those legal troubles for the album's angry, heavier sound.

In 2001, bassist Geezer Butler explained to Dan Epstein, "Around the time of Sabbath Bloody Sabbath, we found out that we were being ripped off by our management and our record company. So, much of the time, when we weren't onstage or in the studio, we were in lawyer's offices trying to get out of all our contracts. We were literally in the studio, trying to record, and we'd be signing all these affidavits and everything. That's why it's called Sabotage – because we felt that the whole process was just being totally sabotaged by all these people ripping us off." In his autobiography I Am Ozzy, singer Ozzy Osbourne confirms that "writs were being delivered to us at the mixing desk". In the liner notes to the 1998 live album Reunion, Butler claimed the band suffered through 10 months of legal cases and admitted, "Music became irrelevant to me. It was a relief just to write a song."

== Recording ==
On the recording process, Iommi explained, "We could've continued and gone on and on, getting more technical, using orchestras and everything else, which we didn't particularly want to. We took a look at ourselves, and we wanted to do a rock album – Sabbath Bloody Sabbath wasn't a rock album, really." According to the book How Black Was Our Sabbath, "The recording sessions would usually carry on into the middle of the night. Tony Iommi was working really hard on the production side of things with the band's co-producer Mike Butcher, and he was spending a lot of time working out his guitar sounds. Bill, too, was experimenting with the drums, especially favouring the 'backwards cymbal' effect." Osbourne, however, grew frustrated with how long Black Sabbath albums were taking to record, writing in his autobiography, "Sabotage took about four thousand years."

According to Iommi, the Sabotage sessions were the scene of a legendary jam session between Black Sabbath and Led Zeppelin. Iommi's recollection may be inaccurate, however, as records show that Zeppelin were on tour in the US at the time Sabotage was being recorded. Ward's recollection of the exact timing of the Zeppelin jam session is also fuzzy. "I don't even know what album we were working on", the drummer explained. "But one of John (Bonham)'s favourite songs was 'Supernaut' – so, when they came down to the studio, he wanted to jam 'Supernaut'." It is more likely that the jam session took place during the recording of the previous album, Sabbath Bloody Sabbath.

== Composition ==
Sabotage is a mix of heavy, powerful songs and experimental tunes such as "Supertzar" and "Am I Going Insane (Radio)". In 2013, Mojo observed, "Opener 'Hole in the Sky' and the crunching 'Symptom of the Universe' illustrate that, for all their problems, Sabbath's power remained undimmed on what was what many consider one of their finest offerings." In the article "Thrash Metal - An Introduction" in University Times Magazine, Vladimir Rakhmanin cites "Symptom of the Universe" as one of the earliest examples of thrash metal, a heavy metal subgenre which emerged in the early 1980s. Tony Iommi describes the song's dynamics in his autobiography Iron Man: "It starts with an acoustic bit. Then it goes into the up-tempo stuff to give it that dynamic, and it does have a lot of changes to it, including the jam at the end." The final part of "Symptom of the Universe" evolved from an in-studio improvisation, created very spontaneously in a single day, and the decision was made to use it in that song. The English Chamber Choir was brought in to perform the song "Supertzar". When vocalist Ozzy Osbourne arrived at the studio and saw them, he thought he was in the wrong studio and left. The title of the pop-leaning "Am I Going Insane (Radio)" caused some confusion due to the "(Radio)" part, which led people to believe the song was a radio cut or radio version. However, this is the only version of the song: the term "radio-rental" is rhyming slang for "mental".

The brief instrumental "Don't Start (Too Late)" is an acoustic guitar showpiece for Iommi, titled for tape operator David Harris, who often despaired at Sabbath being prone to start playing before he was ready to start recording.

"The Writ" is one of only a handful of Black Sabbath songs to feature lyrics composed by vocalist Osbourne, who typically relied on bassist Butler for lyrics. The song was inspired by the frustrations Osbourne felt at the time, as Black Sabbath's former manager Patrick Meehan was suing the band after having been fired. The song viciously attacks the music business in general and is a savage diatribe directed towards Meehan specifically ("Are you Satan? Are you man?"), with Osbourne revealing in his memoir, "I wrote most of the lyrics myself, which felt a bit like seeing a shrink. All the anger I felt towards Meehan came pouring out." During this period, the band began to question if there was any point to recording albums and touring endlessly "just to pay the lawyers". Thematically, "The Writ" and "Megalomania" are intertwined, according to drummer Ward, as they both deal with the same tensions arising from these ongoing legal troubles.

The hidden track "Blow on a Jug" at the end of "The Writ" was performed by Ozzy Osbourne and Bill Ward as they were playing around at the piano between recording sessions; the song was recorded without their knowledge. The 31-second skit was a parodic tribute to the band Mungo Jerry who used jugs in their performances. According to Ward, "Blow on a Jug" was "a drunken song that Ozzy and me would sing together in a van or on a plane. That’s me on piano and Ozzy blowing on one of those brown cider jugs, playing it like a tuba."

== Artwork ==
Sabotage's front cover art has garnered mixed reactions over the years and is regarded by some as one of the worst album covers in rock history. The inverted mirror concept was conceived by Graham Wright, Bill Ward's drum tech, who was also a graphic artist. The band attended what they believed was a test photo shoot for the album cover, thus explaining their choice of clothing. Said Ward, "The only thing we didn't discuss was what we'd all wear on the day of the shot. Since that shoot day, the band has survived through a tirade of clothing comments and jokes that continue to this day". Ward, in fact, was wearing his wife's red tights in the photo. Wright recalls in the book How Black Was Our Sabbath that the plan was for each band member to appear on the cover dressed in black and had been instructed to bring some stage clothes for preliminary photos, but when they arrived, no black costumes had been laid out by the designers, and "the original concept had been overruled." The designers "carried on with the shoot, explaining they would superimpose the images at a later stage and that it would look great, to be honest. The session was unbelievably rushed, and the outcome was far from what had been originally envisaged. Ironically, the sleeve design that was intended to illustrate the idea of sabotage had instead become a victim of sabotage itself. By the time they saw it, it was too late to change."

== Release ==
Sabotage was released in the United States on 28 July 1975 and in September 1975 in the United Kingdom where it peaked at number 7. In the US, it peaked at the Billboard 200 at number 28. The album was certified Silver (60,000 units sold) in the UK by the BPI on 1 December 1975 and Gold in the US on 16 June 1997, but was the band's first release not to achieve platinum status in the US.

The band toured the US in support of Sabotage in 1975, which included a filmed appearance for the prestigious series Don Kirshner's Rock Concert at the Santa Monica Civic Auditorium. Sabbath played "Killing Yourself to Live", "Hole in the Sky", "Snowblind", "War Pigs" and "Paranoid". During Iommi's guitar solo during "Snowblind", plastic snowflakes were dropped from above on the audience and the band, a gimmick used during the band's live shows during this period. According to the book How Black Was Our Sabbath, "The audience was limited to just a couple thousand fans, and it seemed like the whole of LA got wind of it." Due to the band's expanding use of orchestras and other new sounds in the studio, the tour in support of Sabotage was the first in which Black Sabbath used a full-time keyboardist onstage, Gerald "Jezz" Woodroffe. Black Sabbath toured with openers Kiss but were forced to cut the tour short in November 1975 after vocalist Osbourne was injured in a motorcycle accident.

== Reception ==
Professional ratings
Aggregate scores
Source	Rating
Metacritic	92/100 (super deluxe)
Review scores
Source	Rating
AllMusic	4.5/5 stars
Classic Rock	4.5/5 stars
Encyclopedia of Popular Music	3/5 stars
The Great Rock Discography	7/10
Rolling Stone	favourable
The Rolling Stone Album Guide	4/5 stars
Sputnikmusic	4.7/5
MusicHound Rock	3/5
Spin Alternative Record Guide	9/10

For the second time, a Black Sabbath album initially saw favourable reviews, with Rolling Stone stating, "Sabotage is not only Black Sabbath's best record since Paranoid, it might be their best ever." Later reviews were also favourable; Greg Prato of AllMusic said that "Sabotage is the final release of Black Sabbath's legendary First Six" but noted that "the magical chemistry that made such albums as Paranoid and Vol. 4 so special was beginning to disintegrate." Guitarist Yngwie Malmsteen told Nick Bowcott of Guitar Player in 2008 that the riff to "Symptom of the Universe" was the first Tony Iommi riff he ever heard and that "Tony's use of the flat fifth would have got him burned at the stake a couple hundred years ago." In 2017, Rolling Stone ranked it 32nd on their "100 Greatest Metal Albums of All Time" list.

In 1991, Chuck Eddy ranked Sabotage 20th in his 1991 book of the 500 best heavy metal albums, naming it the band's best and most eccentric album, consisting of "strange cut-up pastiches inside stranger cut-up pastiches" that hark back to the Firesign Theatre and William Burroughs and ahead to Queensrÿche's Operation: Mindcrime (1988). He added: "Everything—concise solos, voices chanting 'opcit, opsist, obsessed...', evil laughs, seven seconds from some ancient jugband 78, choruses grunting 'suck me!'—jumps out from nowhere. Like in a great hip-hop mix, every sound disorients you, surprises you, but somehow every sound fits so perfectly that you couldn't imagine it anywhere else". Rob Michaels of the Spin Alternative Record Guide comments that the album's use of strings and "studio trickery" represented a maturation over Sabbath Bloody Sabbath, resulting in the group's most consistent recording.The Guardian describes it as "The last of the run of great albums (the fact you can see drummer Bill Ward’s underpants through his wife’s red tights on the cover is a handy metaphor for a band that was about to lose its grip), and still fantastic...it is an album full of invention.”

== Track listing ==
All tracks are written by Black Sabbath (Geezer Butler, Tony Iommi, Ozzy Osbourne and Bill Ward).

Side A
No.	Title	Length
1.	"Hole in the Sky"	3:59
2.	"Don't Start (Too Late)" (instrumental)	0:49
3.	"Symptom of the Universe"	6:29
4.	"Megalomania"	9:42

Side B
No.	Title	Length
5.	"The Thrill of It All"	5:55
6.	"Supertzar" (instrumental - with vocalizing choir)	3:44
7.	"Am I Going Insane (Radio)"	4:14
8.	"The Writ" (includes hidden track (Note: Some versions of Sabotage contain a short hidden track entitled "Blow on a Jug" starting at a very low volume 8:15 after "The Writ".))	8:45
Total length:		43:44

=== 2021 Super Deluxe Edition ===
Disc one
No.	Title	Length

Disc two (North American Tour Live '75, Part 1)
No.	Title	Length
1.	"Supertzar / Killing Yourself to Live"	6:45
2.	"Hole in the Sky"	4:36
3.	"Snowblind"	6:44
4.	"Symptom of the Universe"	4:34
5.	"War Pigs"	8:23
6.	"Megalomania"	10:59
7.	"Sabbra Cadabra"	5:20
8.	"Jam 1 / Guitar Solo"	7:52
9.	"Jam 2 / Drum Solo"	6:06
10.	"Supernaut"	2:21
11.	"Iron Man"	6:16
Total length:		69:58

Disc three (North American Tour Live '75, Part 2)
No.	Title	Length
1.	"Guitar Solo / Orchid / Rock 'n' Roll Doctor / Don't Start (Too Late)"	8:46
2.	"Black Sabbath"	6:46
3.	"Spiral Architect"	5:15
4.	"Embryo / Children of the Grave"	6:00
5.	"Paranoid"	3:03
Total length:		29:50

Disc four (Japanese Single)
No.	Title	Length
1.	"Am I Going Insane (Radio) - Single Edit"	3:27
2.	"Hole in the Sky"	3:59
Total length:		7:26

Notes

- Discs two and three of the 2021 Super Deluxe edition feature a live recording of the band's performance on 5 August 1975 at the Convention Hall in Asbury Park, New Jersey. Tracks 2, 4, and 6 of disc two were previously released on the 2002 live album Past Lives, while tracks 1, 3, 5, 7–11 of disc two and tracks 1–5 of disc three were all previously unreleased. Despite that, this entire recording has been available on bootleg releases for many years.
- Disc four of the 2021 Super Deluxe edition features a single edit for “Am I Going Insane (Radio)”, followed by “Hole In The Sky” (being the B-side on the vinyl version), with artwork replicating the very rare Japanese release of the single.

== Personnel ==
=== Black Sabbath ===
- Ozzy Osbourne – lead vocals
- Tony Iommi – guitars, piano, synthesiser, organ, harp on "Supertzar"
- Geezer Butler – bass guitar
- Bill Ward – drums, percussion, piano and backing/scat vocals on "Blow on a Jug"

=== Additional personnel ===
- Will Malone – arrangements for the English Chamber Choir (track 6)
- Black Sabbath – co-producer
- Mike Butcher – co-producer / engineer
- Robin Black – engineer
- David Harris – tape operator and saboteur

== Charts ==
Chart (1975)	Peak position
Austrian Albums (Ö3 Austria)	6
Canada Top Albums/CDs (RPM)	33
German Albums (Offizielle Top 100)	17
New Zealand Albums (RMNZ)	33
Norwegian Albums (VG-lista)	6
UK Albums (Official Charts)	7
US Billboard 200	28

Chart (2021)	Peak position
Australian Albums (ARIA)	124
Belgian Albums (Ultratop Wallonia)	109
German Albums (Offizielle Top 100)	17
Scottish Albums (Official Charts)	51
Swiss Albums (Schweizer Hitparade)	25
UK Independent Albums (Official Charts)	32
UK Rock & Metal Albums (Official Charts)	7

Chart (2025)	Peak position
Croatian International Albums (HDU)	30
Hungarian Physical Albums (MAHASZ)	40

== Certifications ==
Region	Certification	Certified units/sales
United Kingdom (BPI)	Silver	60,000^{^}
United States (RIAA)	Gold	500,000^{^}
^{^} Shipments figures based on certification alone.
