= Sadness Will Prevail =

2002 studio album by Today Is the Day

Studio album by Today Is the Day
- Released: September 3, 2002
- Recorded: December 1, 1999 – April 26, 2002
- Studio: Austin Enterprise, Nashville, Tennessee; Mastering, Clinton, Massachusetts
- Genre: Noise rock; post-hardcore; avant-garde metal; grindcore; sludge metal
- Length: 145:06 (US), 153:05 (JP)
- Label: Relapse
- Producer: Steve Austin

Today Is the Day chronology
Live Till You Die (2000)	Sadness Will Prevail (2002)	Kiss the Pig (2004)

Professional ratings
Review scores
Source	Rating
Allmusic	2.5/5 stars
Apeshit	Very Positive
Blistering	Very Negative
BraveWords	8.0/10 stars
Chronicles of Chaos	6.5/10 stars
Maelstrom Zine	Positive

Sadness Will Prevail is a double album and the sixth studio album by Today Is the Day, released on September 3, 2002 through Relapse Records. At over two hours and twenty-five minutes in length, it is currently the longest album of the band's career as well as their most polarizing in terms of critical reception.

== Background ==
The album took three years to write and six months to record, mix, and master all at Steve Austin's self run studio Austin Enterprise. Reoccurring themes of the album include isolation, depression, death, suicide, and violence. The album, for the most part, was inspired by a period of time when Austin was stuck in his home due to a severe snow storm with his family. Another big inspiration for the album was the rise of technology and the internet, which according to Austin, influenced his decision to stop using his phone to instead use E-Mail to communicate with other people.

According to Austin, the biggest inspiration for him to do a two-hour double disc album was in attempt to progress from the "really fast and stripped down" In the Eyes of God. Each track on the album was intentionally mixed so that there was a continuous flow between one track to the next, this was done in attempt to give the album a tone similar to that of a movie soundtrack. The artwork for the album, a grainy black-and-white photograph of a drug addicted woman sitting in the corner of an empty room, was specifically chosen for the album's cover because it goes along with the album's themes of despair and impending doom.

The audio sample from "Christianized Magick" was taken from the 2000 film Paradise Lost 2: Revelations, a documentary about the West Memphis Three.

== Reception ==
Upon its initial release in 2002, Sadness Will Prevail received mixed critical reception. William York, of AllMusic, gave the record two and a half stars out of five, questioning the album's low-end lacking mixing and critiquing what he refers to as "the abundance of filler on [the] two discs". Xander Hoose of Chronicles of Chaos gave the album six and a half stars out of a possible ten, stating that Austin's performance on the album is "far below his capabilities" and criticizing his vocals and production work on the album. R. Temin of Blistering.com gave the album a thumbs down for its vocals, long runtime, and packaging, referring to it as "pretentious crap".

Maelstrom Zine's Roberto Martinelli, on the other hand, praised the album and called it the group's "most diverse and complete effort". Extreme metal fanzine Apeshit also gave the album a positive review, stating that Sadness Will Prevail contained "the darkest, most miserable, schizophrenic suicidal sounds you're most likely find" and ending their review stating that it is "the most original, albeit miserable album in recent memory". Similarly, BraveWords editor Chris Bruni called the album "one of the harshest, most insane releases [he's] heard all year".

== Track listing ==
All tracks are written by Steve Austin.

Disc One (X)
No.	Title	Length
1.	"Maggots and Riots"	2:58
2.	"Criminal"	4:40
3.	"Distortion of Nature"	2:45
4.	"Crooked"	2:59
5.	"Butterflies"	3:07
6.	"Unearthed"	3:16
7.	"The Descent"	4:59
8.	"Death Requiem"	4:17
9.	"Christianized Magick"	5:24
10.	"Voice of Reason: Vicious Barker"	2:20
11.	"Face After the Shot"	4:09
12.	"The Ivory of Self-Hate"	3:40
13.	"The Nailing"	5:35
14.	"Mistake"	3:35
15.	"Invincible"	7:30
16.	"Aurora"	3:02
17.	"Sadness Will Prevail"	8:04
18.	"You Gotta Give a Man a Mile" (Japanese CD bonus track)	2:26
Total length:		72:20 74:46

Disc Two (Y)
No.	Title	Length
1.	"Myriad"	6:09
2.	"Spaceship"	1:54
3.	"Flowers Made of Flesh"	3:21
4.	"Your Life Is Over"	4:31
5.	"Control the Media"	6:39
6.	"Vivicide"	2:33
7.	"Miasma"	1:01
8.	"Times of Pain"	4:02
9.	"Breadwinner"	1:20
10.	"Friend"	2:08
11.	"Never Answer the Phone"	23:15
12.	"I Live to See You Smile"	4:28
13.	"Sadness Will Prevail Theme"	11:25
14.	"The Good Life" (Japanese CD bonus track)	5:33
Total length:		72:46 78:19

== Accolades ==
Year	Publication	Country	Accolade	Rank
2002	Rockdelux	Spain	"Albums of the Year"	9
2002	Terrorizer	United Kingdom	"Albums of the Year"	27
2006	Exclaim!	Canada	"Top Ten Albums of 2002"	10
"*" denotes an unordered list.

== Personnel ==
Adapted from the Sadness Will Prevail liner notes.

Today Is the Day

- Steve Austin – vocals, guitar, bass guitar, sampler, piano, keyboards, production, mixing, recording, mastering, cover art, design
- Chris Debari – bass guitar, guitar
- Marshall Kilpatric – drums, percussion

Production and additional personnel

- Shawn Briggs – design
- Kris Force – electric violin, acoustic violin
- Jackie Gratz – cello
- Orion Landau – cover art, design
- Mark Morton – additional guitar
- Seth Putnam – vocals on "Butterflies"
- Wrest – sampler

== Release history ==
Region	Date	Label	Format	Catalog
United States	2002	Relapse	2CD	RR 6532-2
Japan	2002	Ritual	2CD	HWCY-1101
Worldwide	2021	SuperNova	Streaming	N/A
