= Pain Is a Warning =

2011 studio album by Today Is the Day

Studio album by Today Is the Day
- Released: August 16, 2011
- Recorded: March 2011
- Studio: Godcity Recording Studio, Salem, Massachusetts
- Genre: Noise rock; alternative metal; sludge metal; post-hardcore
- Length: 43:24
- Label: Black Market Activities
- Producer: Steve Austin

Today Is the Day chronology
Axis of Eden (2007)	Pain Is a Warning (2011)	Animal Mother (2014)

Professional ratings
Review scores
Source	Rating
MetalSucks	4/5 stars
Revolver	4/5 stars

Pain Is a Warning is the ninth album by Today Is the Day, released on August 16, 2011, by Black Market Activities.

== Background and recording ==
Pain Is a Warning is considered by both fans and critics as the band's most accessible work. According to frontman Steve Austin, the intent of the album was to simply be "honest and raw". In an interview with NPR, Austin described their mindset during the writing process of the album as "make up an idea, keep it, make the next idea and then connect it all together."

Lyrically, the album was inspired by the 2008 financial crisis which, according to Austin in a video interview, nearly caused him and his family to go into poverty. The track "Remember to Forget" was written about Austin's mother, who at the time was suffering from Alzheimer's disease. The album's title was inspired from a conversation Austin had with his son.

== Track listing ==
All tracks are written by Steve Austin.

No.	Title	Length
1.	"Expectations Exceed Reality"	3:09
2.	"Death Curse"	2:53
3.	"Pain Is a Warning"	6:32
4.	"Wheelin'"	2:38
5.	"The Devil's Blood"	5:51
6.	"Remember to Forget"	6:45
7.	"Slave to Serenity"	6:14
8.	"This Is You"	3:59
9.	"Samurai"	5:23

== Accolades ==
Year	Publication	Country	Accolade	Rank
2011	Terrorizer	United Kingdom	"Albums of the Year"	11
"*" denotes an unordered list.

== Personnel ==
Adapted from the Pain Is a Warning liner notes.

Today Is the Day

- Steve Austin – vocals, guitar, production
- Ryan Jones – bass guitar, backing vocals
- Curran Reynolds – drums

Production and additional personnel

- Kevin Baker – backing vocals
- Kurt Ballou – mixing, recording; guitar on "This Is You"
- Alan Douches – mastering
- Nate Newton – backing vocals
- Mike Wohlberg – design

== Release history ==
Region	Date	Label	Format	Catalog
United States	2011	Black Market Activities	CD, LP	BMA041
