= Axis of Eden =

2007 studio album by Today Is the Day

Studio album by Today Is the Day
- Released: September 18, 2007
- Recorded: 2003–2007
- Studio: Austin Enterprise, Nashville, Tennessee; Mastering, Clinton, Massachusetts
- Genre: Noise rock; avant-garde metal; extreme metal
- Length: 41:55
- Label: SuperNova
- Producer: Steve Austin

Today Is the Day chronology
Kiss the Pig (2004)	Axis of Eden (2007)	Pain Is a Warning (2011)

Professional ratings
Review scores
Source	Rating
Allmusic	3.5/5 stars
Last Rites	Positive
Punk News	3.5/5 stars
Revolver	Positive
Scene Point Blank	6/10 stars

Axis of Eden is the eighth album by Today Is the Day, released on September 18, 2007 by SuperNova Records, an independent label run by Steve Austin. It is the last album to feature bassist Chris Debari and the only Today Is the Day album to feature Derek Roddy. In 2008, a film was produced based on the album, titled Axis of Eden – The Film, which was released via digital download through SuperNova.

The track "Free At Last" was written on piano after a fight broke out between Steve Austin and his wife. The track "Broken Promises and Dead Dreams" was written about Relapse Records.

== Track listing ==
All tracks are written by Steve Austin, except "The Worst Thing That Ever Happened to Me" co-written by Shawn Crahan and Chris Debari.

No.	Title	Length
1.	"IED"	1:18
2.	"Free at Last"	3:48
3.	"Broken Promises and Dead Dreams"	2:00
4.	"If You Want Peace Prepare for War"	6:02
5.	"No Lung Baby"	3:57
6.	"Black Steyr Aug"	4:11
7.	"My Wish Is Your Command"	2:06
8.	"Circus Maximus"	3:58
9.	"Total Resistance"	4:10
10.	"The Worst Thing That Ever Happened to Me"	2:53
11.	"Axis of Eden"	3:29
12.	"Desolation"	4:03

== Personnel ==
Adapted from the Axis of Eden liner notes.

Today Is the Day

- Steve Austin – vocals, guitar, piano, production, mixing, mastering, cover art
- Chris Debari – bass guitar
- Derek Roddy – drums

== Release history ==
Region	Date	Label	Format	Catalog
United States	2007	SuperNova	CD	SNR008
