= Kiss the Pig =

2004 studio album by Today Is the Day

Studio album by Today Is the Day
- Released: June 29, 2004
- Recorded: November 29, 2003 – April 22, 2004
- Studio: Austin Enterprise, Nashville, Tennessee; Mastering, Clinton, Massachusetts
- Genre: Grindcore
- Length: 36:26
- Label: Relapse, Rococo
- Producer: Steve Austin

Today Is the Day chronology
Sadness Will Prevail (2002)	Kiss the Pig (2004)	Axis of Eden (2007)

Professional ratings
Review scores
Source	Rating
Allmusic	4/5 stars
Chronicles of Chaos	7.5/10 stars
Lambgoat	6/10 stars
Last Rites	Positive

Kiss the Pig is the seventh album by Today Is the Day, released on June 29, 2004 through Relapse Records. Lyrically, the album takes inspiration from the presidency of George W. Bush and the Iraq War. Steve Austin wrote most of the album after a live performance the band played with Slayer in Japan. The same show is where the group met Japanese charcoal artist Takanami Kazuhiko, whose painting titled Evileyes was chosen for the album's cover before recording even began.

The album's title is supposed to be a reference to Austin's critique of capitalism and American society, and was inspired by how "all of us, from the day we are born are taught to love and worship money, even though money is the ruin of mankind."

== Track listing ==
All tracks are written by Steve Austin.

No.	Title	Length
1.	"Why They Hate Us"	3:35
2.	"Kiss the Pig"	2:00
3.	"Mother's Ruin"	2:27
4.	"This Machine Kills Fascists"	2:46
5.	"Outland"	1:40
6.	"Don't Tread on Hope"	2:25
7.	"Sympathy Junky"	0:44
8.	"Platinum Pussy"	4:43
9.	"Train Train"	0:40
10.	"Bee's Wax and Star Wars"	3:13
11.	"Birthright"	12:13

== Accolades ==
Year	Publication	Country	Accolade	Rank
2004	Rock Sound	United Kingdom	"Albums of the Year"	45
"*" denotes an unordered list.

== Personnel ==
Adapted from the Kiss the Pig liner notes.

=== Today Is the Day ===
- Steve Austin – vocals, guitar, sampler, production, engineering
- Chris Debari – bass guitar, backing vocals
- Mike Rosswog – drums

=== Production ===
- Aaron Kotilainen – assistant engineering
- Dave Wilson – assistant engineering

== Release history ==
Region	Date	Label	Format	Catalog
United States	2004	Relapse	CD	RR 6619
United States	2004	Rococo	LP	RCC-0004
