= Live Till You Die =

2000 compilation album by Today Is the Day

Compilation album by Today Is the Day
- Released: August 29, 2000
- Recorded: 1996–1999
- Studio: Austin Enterprise, Nashville, Tennessee; Mastering, Clinton, Massachusetts
- Genre: Noise rock, avant-garde metal, grindcore
- Length: 33:56
- Label: Relapse
- Producer: Steve Austin

Today Is the Day chronology
In the Eyes of God (1999)	Live Till You Die (2000)	Sadness Will Prevail (2002)

Professional ratings
Review scores
Source	Rating
AllMusic	3/5 stars

Live Till You Die is a compilation album by Today Is the Day, released on August 29, 2000, through Relapse Records. It collects various unreleased studio, live, and demo tracks.

"Feel Like Makin' Love", "Wicked Game", and "Why Don't We Do It in the Road?" are covers of songs originally from Bad Company, Chris Isaak, and The Beatles, respectively.

== Track listing ==
All tracks are written by Steve Austin, except where noted.

No.	Title	Writer(s)	Length
1.	"The Color of Psychic Power" (live)		2:14
2.	"Pinnacle" (live)		1:29
3.	"Feel Like Makin' Love"	Mick Ralphs, Paul Rodgers	2:08
4.	"Temple of the Morning Star" (acoustic, live)		2:32
5.	"Wicked Game"	Chris Isaak	2:11
6.	"Crutch" (live)		1:12
7.	"Ripped Off" (acoustic)		3:28
8.	"High as the Sky" (live)		2:11
9.	"In the Eyes of God" (live)		3:07
10.	"Users"		0:25
11.	"TDA"		3:22
12.	"Blindspot" (acoustic, live)		1:59
13.	"Why Don't We Do It in the Road?"	Lennon–McCartney	1:10
14.	"Afterlife" (live)		2:07
15.	"The Man Who Loves to Hurt Himself" (live)		4:21

== Release history ==
Region	Date	Label	Format	Catalog
United States	2000	Relapse	CD	RR 6457

== Personnel ==
Today Is the Day

- Steve Austin – vocals, guitar, production, engineering, mixing, recording, mastering
- Brann Dailor – drums (tracks 1–3, 5, 8, 9, 13–15)
- Bill Kelliher – bass guitar (tracks 1–3, 5, 8, 9, 13–15)
- Christopher Reeser – bass guitar, sampler (tracks 4, 6, 12)
- Mike Hyde – drums, percussion (tracks 4, 12)
- Brad Elrod – drums (track 6)
