= Supernova (Today Is the Day album) =

1993 studio album by Today Is the Day

Studio album by Today Is the Day
- Released: April 10, 1993
- Recorded: 1993
- Studio: AmRep Recording Division, Minneapolis, Minnesota
- Genre: Noise rock; avant-garde metal; alternative metal
- Length: 53:30
- Label: Amphetamine Reptile
- Producer: Steve Austin, Tim Mac

Today Is the Day chronology
Supernova (1993)	Willpower (1994)

Supernova is the debut studio album by American band Today Is the Day, released in April 1993 by Amphetamine Reptile Records. In 2008, a remastered version of the album, including tracks from the band's "I Bent Scared" 7" single, was released via Steve Austin's self run SuperNova Records. A music video was produced for the track "6 Dementia Satyr".

== Reception ==
Professional ratings
Review scores
Source	Rating
Allmusic	4.5/5 stars
Last Rites	Very Positive
Prefix Magazine	8.5/10 stars
Scene Point Blank	8/10 stars

Since its initial release in 1993, Supernova has been awarded with praise from critics for its style and musicianship. Patrick Kennedy of Allmusic awarded it 4 and a half out of 5 stars, hailing it as a "landmark recording" that "indicates that metal could indeed be far more than a simple, formulaic system of chugging riffs, screamed vocals, and stampeding drums." Last Rites' Andrew Edmunds called the album "an essential purchase" and mentioned how the band "would lay the groundwork for a seemingly never-ending wave of spastic metal bands" in his review for the 2008 edition of the album.

In an interview with the Lords of Metal fanzine, Steve Austin showed much satisfaction with older Today Is the Day work, mentioning how both Supernova and its successor Willpower are "the most fucked up albums that have ever been on planet Earth" and even suggested that the album played a key role in the development of heavy metal music, citing that artists such as The Dillinger Escape Plan and Botch were influenced by the sound of Today Is the Day. Deadguy drummer Dave Rosenberg, who was briefly a member of Today Is the Day in 1996, described Supernova as one of his favorite albums of all time.

== Track listing ==
All tracks are written by Steve Austin.

No.	Title	Length
1.	"Black Dahlia"	3:31
2.	"6 Dementia Satyr"	4:11
3.	"Silver Tongue"	4:19
4.	"Blind Man at Mystic Lake"	4:07
5.	"Adult World"	5:15
6.	"The Begging"	2:28
7.	"The Kick Inside"	5:47
8.	"Goose Is Cooked"	6:27
9.	"Timeless"	0:39
10.	"Rise"	4:42
11.	"The Guilt Barber"	2:08
12.	"Self Portrait"	9:51

2008 Remastered CD bonus tracks
No.	Title	Length
13.	"I Bent Scared"	4:45
14.	"C'mon Down and Get Saved"	5:07
Total length:		63:32

== Personnel ==
Adapted from the Supernova liner notes.

Today Is the Day

- Steve Austin – vocals, guitar
- Mike Herrell – bass guitar
- Brad Elrod – drums

Production

- Tim Mac – production

== Release history ==
Region	Date	Label	Format	Catalog
United States	1993	Amphetamine Reptile	CD, CS, LP	AMREP 047
Germany	1993	Amphetamine Reptile	CD, CS, LP	ARR 44/290
United States	2008	SuperNova	CD	SNR014
United States	2010	Relapse	2LP	RR 7086
