= Cable (American band) =

American metal band

- Origin: Rockville, Connecticut, U.S.
- Genres: Metalcore, sludge metal
- Years active: 1994–2006; 2008–present
- Labels: Doghouse Records; Hydra Head Records; The End Records

Cable is an American band formed in 1994 in Rockville, Connecticut. They combine a hardcore punk and emo aesthetic with a rhythmically complex, often discordant metal-influenced musical approach. Lineup changes and delays between recordings may have hindered their notoriety over the years.

== History ==
The quartet formed in 1994, at which time it consisted of Randy Larsen (guitar/vocals), Vic Szalaj (drums), Matt Becker (guitar), and Jeff Caxide (bass) and were players in Connecticut's "noise-core" scene. This line-up recorded a demo and appeared on a split 7-inch with Malcolm's Lost. Vocalist Aaron Lazauski joined the band briefly and appeared on the "Part Three"/"Feed Me Glass" 7-inch in 1995. Soon, both Lazauski and Larsen left the band and Bernie Romanowski joined the group as vocalist/guitarist. In the documentary Last Call, Jeff Caxide stated that he was unhappy with Larsen's departure and soon, he parted ways with Cable, only to, ironically, be replaced by a returning Randy Larsen, who picked up the bass upon re-entry into the band. In 1997, their debut album Variable Speed Drive was released by Doghouse Records. Larson briefly joined Caxide's new band Isis, and they toured with Cable during the summer of 1998. Isis drummer Aaron Harris filled in for Cable during this tour after their drummer quit the band.

After a brief split, the band's second full-length (and first for label Hydra Head Records), Gutter Queen, was released in 1999. Cable was down to just a three-piece for Gutter Queen, with Becker having left by this point. The next couple of years saw shows with bands including Neurosis, Today is the Day, Cave In, Botch, Isis, and others. The group split again when Romanowski moved to Colorado without informing the rest of the group. After a year, he returned and Cable reunited. In 2001, the trio of Larsen, Romanowski, and Szalaj recorded Northern Failures, their last release for Hydra Head, as well as a new EP entitled Skyhorse Jams, issued by This Dark Reign Recordings in 2001. The group was back to a quartet lineup for this EP after the addition of second guitarist Ben Cowles.

The Skyhorse Jams EP showed the group moving towards more of a Southern rock-influenced hardcore/metal style. In 2003, the band released Never Trust A Gemini, which saw the band adding another member, second vocalist Peter Farris. After what was termed as a "nasty falling out with the other dudes in the band", Cable regrouped again for 2004's Pigs Never Fly, which saw the band move to Philadelphia's Translation Loss Records and swap Ben Cowles for Aaron Lewis, who also recorded the album. Chris Fischkelta joined the band after its recording and Bernie Romanowski departed once again. The band's final performance was on December 18, 2005, at NYC's now defunct CBGB. The band called it quits shortly after. 2006's Last Call CD/DVD compiled a new song with a selection of previously released tracks, a documentary on the band, and included audio and video of the CBGB show.

The band became active again after re-forming in 2008. In mid-2008, Cable re-released the Variable Speed Drive record on Translation Loss Records. In 2009, they recorded a new album, The Failed Convict with Joel Hamilton at Studio G in Brooklyn, NY. The Failed Convict was released on August 8, 2009, on The End Records. This album features 13 songs, which is the band's longest album to date. The Failed Convict was engineered by Joel Hamilton. featured artwork by Aaron Horkey (Mogwai, Pelican) and guest vocals by Mike Watt on the track "Outside Abeline."

== Members ==
Current members

- Bernie Romanowski (guitar)
- Randy Larsen (bass, vocals)
- Vic Szalaj (drums)
- Chris Fischkelta (guitar)
- Peter Farris (vocals)

Original lineup (1994–1996)

- Randy Larsen (guitar, vocals)
- Vic Szalaj (drums)
- Matt Becker (guitar)
- Jeff Caxide (bass)

Later members

- Bernie Romanowski (guitar)
- Aaron Lazauski (vocals)
- Ben Cowles (guitar)
- Aaron Lewis (guitar)

Former touring members

- Aaron Harris (drums)

== Discography ==
- 1994: Demo Cassette (self-released)
- 1995: Cable/Malcom's Lost split 7-inch (Moo Cow Records 004)
- 1995: Part Three/Feed Me Glass 7-inch (Atomic Action Records)
- 1996: Variable Speed Drive (Doghouse Records)
- 1997: Cable 7-inch (Atomic Action)
- 1999: Gutter Queen (Hydra Head Records)
- 2001: Northern Failures (Hydra Head)
- 2001: Skyhorse Jams (This Dark Reign)
- 2003: Never Trust a Gemini (This Dark Reign)
- 2004: Pigs Never Fly (Translation Loss Records)
- 2006: Last Call CD/DVD Retrospective (Translation Loss)
- 2008: Variable Speed Drive re-issue w/Bonus Tracks (Translation Loss)
- 2009: The Failed Convict (The End Records)
- 2017: It Cost Me Everything 1994–1995 (compilation) (Atomic Action)
- 2019: Take The Stairs To Hell (Translation Lost)
