= Today Is the Day (Today Is the Day album) =

1996 studio album by Today Is the Day

Studio album by Today Is the Day
- Released: March 26, 1996
- Recorded: 1996
- Studio: Austin Enterprise, Nashville, Tennessee
- Genre: Noise rock; avant-garde metal; alternative metal
- Length: 36:43
- Label: Amphetamine Reptile
- Producer: Steve Austin

Today Is the Day chronology
Willpower (1994)	Today Is the Day (1996)	Temple of the Morning Star (1997)

Professional ratings
Review scores
Source	Rating
Allmusic	4/5 stars
Scene Point Blank	7.5/10 stars

Today Is the Day is the third studio album by American noise rock band Today Is the Day. It was released on March 26, 1996 by Amphetamine Reptile Records. It was the band's only studio album to feature keyboardist Scott Wexton.

In 2008, a remastered version of the album containing two bonus tracks that originated from the Amphetamine Reptile Clusterfuck compilations was released through Steve Austin's SuperNova Records. A live performance DVD was released a year earlier. It was filmed during the tour for the self-titled album, titled Today Is the Day Live.

== Track listing ==
All tracks are written by Steve Austin.

No.	Title	Length
1.	"Kai Piranha"	1:15
2.	"Marked"	4:48
3.	"Bugs Death March"	5:25
4.	"A Man of Science"	0:58
5.	"Realization"	4:26
6.	"Black Iron Prison"	1:57
7.	"Mountain People"	2:15
8.	"Ripped Off"	3:37
9.	"The Tragedy"	2:53
10.	"She Is in Fear of Death"	4:11
11.	"I Love My Woman"	0:26
12.	"Dot Matrix"	4:28

2008 remastered CD bonus tracks
No.	Title	Length
13.	"Hands and Knees"	2:55
14.	"Pipe Dream Zero"	4:01
Total length:		43:39

== Personnel ==
Adapted from the Today Is the Day liner notes.

Today Is the Day

- Steve Austin – vocals, guitar, sampler, production, engineering
- Brad Elrod – drums
- Scott Wexton – synthesizer, sampler

== Release history ==
Region	Date	Label	Format	Catalog
United States	1996	Amphetamine Reptile	CD, CS, LP	AMREP 046
Germany	1996	Amphetamine Reptile	CD, CS, LP	ARR 71/014
United States	2008	SuperNova	CD	SNR 015
United States	2010	Relapse	LP	RR 7088
