= No Good to Anyone =

2020 studio album by Today Is the Day

Studio album by Today Is the Day
- Released: February 28, 2020
- Studio: AERM (Orland, Maine)
- Genre: Avant-garde metal; noise rock; post-hardcore; post-metal
- Length: 49:32
- Label: BMG; The End
- Producer: Steve Austin

Today Is the Day chronology
Animal Mother (2014)	No Good to Anyone (2020)	Never Give In (2025)

Singles from No Good to Anyone
- 1. "No Good to Anyone" Released: December 12, 2019; 2. "You're All Gonna Die" Released: January 9, 2020; 3. "Burn in Hell" Released: February 13, 2020

No Good to Anyone is the eleventh studio album by American band Today Is the Day, released on February 28, 2020 through BMG and The End Records, the first recording by the group to be issued through a major label. The album went through a lengthy production process as a result of health complications frontman Steve Austin faced, and was released five years after the band's 2014 album Animal Mother, marking the longest gap between albums for the band. Jef Whitehead of black metal band Leviathan painted the cover artwork for the album.

The album was promoted with three digital-only singles: "No Good to Anyone", "You're All Gonna Die", and "Burn in Hell", the third of which had a music video produced for it.

== Background ==
Production for the album begun in 2016, and shortly thereafter the band signed to The End Records for its release as well as the reissue of the band's back catalogue. Many of the album's lyrics were inspired by health problems Austin faced before and during production of the album: both he and his pet dog Callie contracted Lyme disease, and as a result Callie had to be euthanized. The track "Callie" was written to commemorate her. Before that, Austin had been involved in an accident in late 2014 during the band's tour in promotion of Animal Mother, in which the band's van collided with another vehicle, resulting in Austin breaking his ribs.

The track "Orland" was performed by Austin's son, Will Austin, who also played piano on "Rockets and Dreams".

== Reception ==
Professional ratings
Review scores
Source	Rating
Blabbermouth	9/10
Kerrang!	4/5 stars
Metal Storm	(8.2/10)

Writing for Kerrang!, Angela Davey wrote positively about the album stating that it's "a disconcerting listening experience" and "one hell of a trip", ultimately awarding the album four out of five stars. Similarly, writing for Blabbermouth.net, Jay H. Goraina praised the variety of styles used on the songs, stating that "there is no weak link in No Good to Anyone".

== Track listing ==
All tracks are written by Steve Austin.

No Good to Anyone track listing
No.	Title	Length
1.	"No Good to Anyone"	7:28
2.	"Attacked by an Angel"	2:16
3.	"Son of Man"	4:27
4.	"Burn in Hell"	2:41
5.	"You're All Gonna Die"	2:29
6.	"Orland"	0:30
7.	"Cocobolo"	2:42
8.	"Agate"	0:27
9.	"Callie"	4:22
10.	"OJ Kush"	2:15
11.	"Mercy"	4:01
12.	"Born in Blood"	3:35
13.	"Mexico"	4:13
14.	"Rockets and Dreams"	8:06
Total length:		49:32

== Personnel ==
Adapted from the No Good to Anyone liner notes.

Today Is the Day

- Steve Austin – vocals, guitar, production, engineering, mastering
- Tom Bennett – drums, percussion
- DJ Cox – bass guitar, Moog

Additional musicians

- Will Austin – piano on "Orland" and "Rockets and Dreams"
- Mark Ablasou – "Agate" and introduction to "Mexico"
- Jon Morse – "The Last Call"

Artwork

- Jef Whitehead – Cover artwork
- Gianni Tbay – Graphic layout

== Release history ==
Release formats for No Good to Anyone
Region	Date	Label	Format	Catalog
United States	2020	BMG/The End Records	LP, CD	538559971
