= In the Eyes of God =

1999 studio album by Today Is the Day

Studio album by Today Is the Day
- Released: July 20, 1999
- Recorded: March 1999
- Studio: Austin Enterprise, Nashville, Tennessee; Mastering, Clinton, Massachusetts
- Genre: Noise rock; avant-garde metal; alternative metal; grindcore; post-hardcore
- Length: 50:40
- Label: Relapse
- Producer: Steve Austin

Today Is the Day chronology
Temple of the Morning Star (1997)	In the Eyes of God (1999)	Live Till You Die (2000)

Professional ratings
Review scores
Source	Rating
AllMusic	4/5 stars
Alternative Press	4/5 stars
Collector's Guide to Heavy Metal	7/10

In the Eyes of God is the fifth studio album by the American noisegrind band Today Is the Day, released on July 20, 1999, by Relapse Records. It is the only album by the group to feature Brann Dailor and Bill Kelliher, who would both move on to form Mastodon. First issued in 1999 on CD and vinyl formats, the LP was a limited edition of 1,000 total: 900 black copies sold to the public, and 100 clear copies that were given away as gifts to the staff of Relapse.

In 2010, a deluxe reissue of the album was released as a CD, containing six demos written during the early stages of the album's production and a DVD that contain footage of a live concert filmed during the tour for the album. The 2010 reissue was released as an edition of 3000 The album was reissued again on CD and LP formats through The End Records, with digital and CD versions containing an extra disc containing early demo versions of each track on the album. The album's title track was originally written in response to the Waco siege.

== Track listing ==
All tracks are written by Steve Austin.

No.	Title	Length
1.	"In the Eyes of God"	3:11
2.	"Going to Hell"	7:09
3.	"Spotting a Unicorn"	1:20
4.	"Possession"	1:03
5.	"The Color of Psychic Power"	2:05
6.	"Mayari"	3:22
7.	"Soldier of Fortune"	1:50
8.	"Bionic Cock"	1:54
9.	"Argali"	2:13
10.	"Afterlife"	1:46
11.	"Himself"	1:40
12.	"Daddy"	1:13
13.	"Who Is the Black Angel?"	1:27
14.	"Martial Law"	2:32
15.	"False Reality"	2:37
16.	"The Russian Child Porn Ballet"	1:36
17.	"The Cold Harshness of Being Wrong Throughout Your Entire Life"	1:43
18.	"Honor"	2:18
19.	"Worn Out"	0:57
20.	"There Is No End"	8:44

2010 remastered CD bonus tracks
No.	Title	Length
21.	"Afterlife" (demo)	1:51
22.	"Argali" (demo)	2:16
23.	"In the Eyes of God" (demo)	3:09
24.	"Martial Law" (demo)	2:39
25.	"Possession" (demo)	1:07
26.	"Why Don't We Do It In The Road" (demo)	1:51
Total length:		63:33

== Accolades ==
Year	Publication	Country	Accolade	Rank
1999	Terrorizer	United Kingdom	"Albums of the Year"	9
"*" denotes an unordered list.

== Personnel ==
Adapted from the album's liner notes.

Today Is the Day

- Steve Austin – vocals, guitar, production, engineering, mixing, recording, mastering
- Brann Dailor – drums
- Bill Kelliher – bass

Production and design

- Paul Booth – cover art
- Dave Merullo – mastering

== Release history ==
Region	Date	Label	Format	Catalog
United States	1999	Relapse	CD, LP	RR 6424
United States	2010	Relapse	CD	RR 7079
United States	2017	The End Records	2CD, LP	TE38
