= Animal Mother (album) =

2014 studio album by Today Is the Day

Studio album by Today Is the Day
- Released: October 21, 2014
- Recorded: 2013–2014
- Studio: AERM, Orland, Maine
- Genre: Sludge metal; noise rock; post-hardcore; avant-garde metal
- Length: 38:08
- Label: Southern Lord
- Producer: Steve Austin

Today Is the Day chronology
Pain Is a Warning (2011)	Animal Mother (2014)	No Good to Anyone (2020)

Professional ratings
Review scores
Source	Rating
AllMusic	3/5 stars
Echoes and Dust	Favorable
Exclaim!	9/10 stars
Punk News	4.5/5 stars
The Sleeping Shaman	Favorable
Sputnik Music	3.5/5 stars
Terrorizer	8/10 stars

Animal Mother is the tenth album by Today Is the Day, released on October 21, 2014 by Southern Lord Records.

== Background ==
Most of the album's material was written in response to the deteriorating mental and physical health, and the death of, Steve Austin's mother. Austin has described the album as being about human relationships between family and friends. The title Animal Mother was chosen for the record because Austin considered the two words to be polar opposites of each other, which he felt matched the overall theme of the album.

The album was first announced in November 2013 on the band's facebook page, in that announcement he also mentioned that the album's lineup will include bassist Sean Conkling and drummer Jeff Lohrber. The band was signed to Southern Lord Records in June 2014, and the album was released on October 21 of that same year on CD and LP formats. The LP edition of the album removed "Bloodwood" from the track list, in its place is a cover of The Melvins' "Zodiac", from their 1991 album Bullhead. The band's bandcamp page included a version of the album, on digital formats, with both "Bloodwood" and "Zodiac" in the track list. An edition of 100 hand numbered vinyl copies of the album were sold through the band's bandcamp page, all copies were signed by the band. An edition of 400 orange copies were made exclusive for European retailers. There's also an unknown amount of oxblood-orange colored copies made available.

To promote the album, music videos were produced for the tracks "Masada", "Heathen", and "Animal Mother". The band also toured twice, with their intended third tour being cancelled due to a van accident that broke Austin's ribs in his back and his left side. However, he recovered from his injuries five months after the accident and a third tour was set in motion. Before the accident, Today Is the Day were touring with Eyehategod, Iron Reagan, and Power Trip.

Inside the liner notes for the album is a quote that reads "the woods are lovely, dark, and deep, but I have promises to keep, and miles to go before I sleep, and miles to go before I sleep", which is a direct reference to the 1977 film Telefon.

== Track listing ==
All tracks are written by Steve Austin, except where noted.

No.	Title	Length
1.	"Animal Mother"	4:57
2.	"Discipline"	2:58
3.	"Sick of Your Mouth"	3:32
4.	"Imperfection"	1:25
5.	"Law of the Universe"	2:19
6.	"Outlaw" (acoustic)	3:49
7.	"Godcrutch"	2:29
8.	"Divine Reward"	0:57
9.	"Masada"	3:45
10.	"Heathen"	2:18
11.	"Mystic"	3:15
12.	"The Last Strand"	2:35
13.	"Outlaw"	3:49

Bandcamp download bonus tracks
No.	Title	Writer(s)	Length
14.	"Bloodwood" (Also on CD)		7:08
15.	"Zodiac" (Also on LP)	Buzz Osborne, The Melvins	4:10

== Personnel ==
Adapted from the Animal Mother liner notes.

Today Is the Day

- Steve Austin – guitars, vocals, keyboards, electronics
- Sean Conkling – bass, electronics
- Jeff Lohrber – drums

Production and design

- Steve Austin – production, recording, mixing, mastering
- Marc Ablasou – electronics (5, 11)
- Samantha Muljat – cover art, design

== Release history ==
Region	Date	Label	Format	Catalog
United States	2014	Southern Lord	CD, LP	LORD202
