= Willpower (Today Is the Day album) =

1994 studio album by Today Is the Day

Studio album by Today Is the Day
- Released: September 5, 1994
- Recorded: 1994
- Studio: White Room Studios, Detroit, Michigan
- Genre: Noise metal; post-hardcore; space rock; alternative metal
- Length: 29:36
- Label: Amphetamine Reptile
- Producer: Steve Austin

Today Is the Day chronology
Supernova (1993)	Willpower (1994)	Today Is the Day (1996)

Willpower is the second studio album by the American band Today Is the Day, released in September 1994 by Amphetamine Reptile Records. The album was recorded just a few months after Steve Austin's father, whom he had not seen for months at the time, died in a violent car crash. A remastered edition of the album was issued in 2007 through the then-newly formed SuperNova Records, which included the track "Execution Style", a rare extra from the Willpower sessions that was previously released on the compilation Dope-Guns-'N-Fucking in the Streets Volume Ten.

A live performance that was recorded during the tour to promote Willpower was released as a DVD via SuperNova, under the title of Willpower Live in 2007.

It is the only album of the band to have been recorded with the same lineup as the prior album.

== Reception ==
Professional ratings
Review scores
Source	Rating
AllMusic	4.5/5 stars
Kerrang!	4/5 stars
Punk News	4.5/5 stars
Last Rites	Positive

Patrick Kennedy of AllMusic awarded the album 4 and a half out of 5 stars, saying, "Though its time signatures are still tricky in a mathematical way, Willpower's greatest strength is its appeal to the human heart through whatever means necessary."

== Track listing ==
All tracks are written by Steve Austin.

No.	Title	Length
1.	"Willpower"	3:34
2.	"My First Knife"	2:57
3.	"Nothing to Lose"	3:41
4.	"Golden Calf"	3:53
5.	"Sidewinder"	5:33
6.	"Many Happy Returns"	2:33
7.	"Simple Touch"	3:30
8.	"Promised Land" (features an unlisted rendition of "Amazing Grace")	4:42

- "Willpower" contains dialogue from the 1990 film Goodfellas.
- "Promised Land" contains dialogue from the 1955 film Rebel Without a Cause.

2007 remastered CD bonus track
No.	Title	Length
10.	"Execution Style"	2:22
Total length:		31:58

== Personnel ==
Adapted from the Willpower liner notes.

Today Is the Day

- Steve Austin – vocals, guitar, sampler, production, engineering, mastering
- Brad Elrod – drums
- Mike Herrell – bass guitar

Production

- Al Sutton – engineering

== Release history ==
Region	Date	Label	Format	Catalog
United States	1994	Amphetamine Reptile	CD, CS, LP	AMREP 033
Germany	1994	Amphetamine Reptile	CD, CS, LP	ARR 57/354
United States	2007	SuperNova	CD	SNR 001
United States	2010	Relapse	LP	RR 7087
United States	2022	Supernova	LP	SNR 052
