= Today Is the Day =

American noise rock band

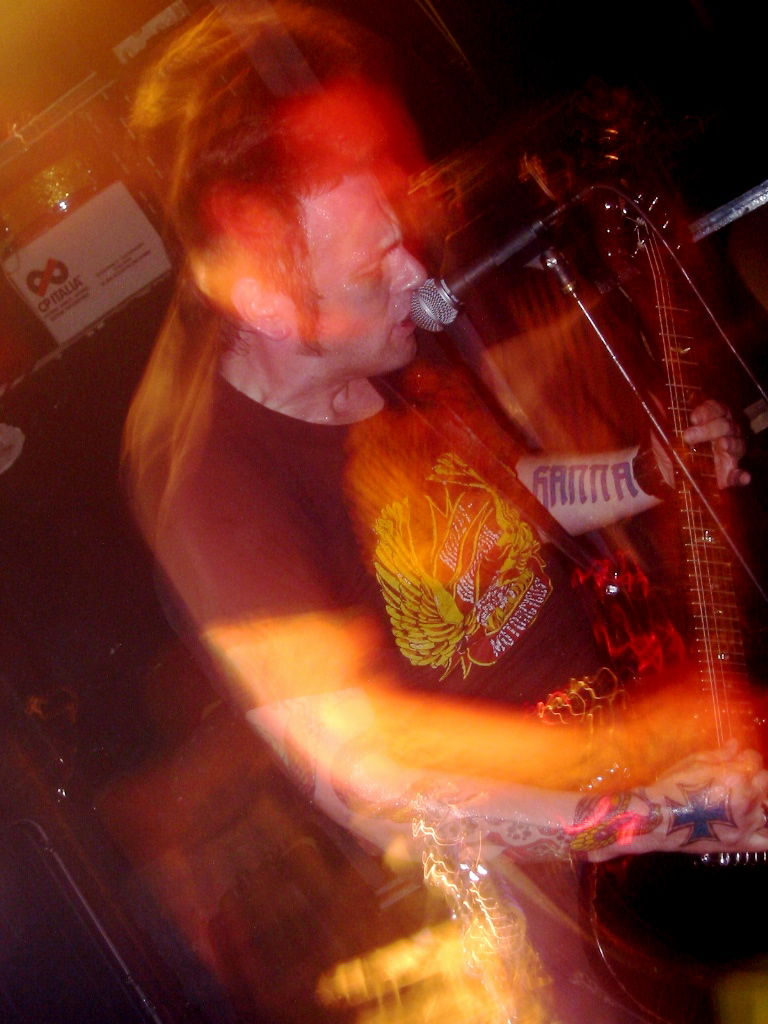
- Today Is the Day in 2003

Background information
- Origin: Nashville, Tennessee
- Genres: Noise rock; avant-garde metal; alternative metal; post-metal; extreme metal; grindcore; post-hardcore
- Years active: 1992–present
- Labels: AmRep; Relapse; SuperNova; BMA; Southern Lord; The End; BMG
- Members: Steve Austin; Thomas Jack; Colin Frecknall
- Past members: List of Today Is the Day members

Today Is the Day is an American noise rock and experimental metal band that originally formed in Nashville, Tennessee. The band's diverse sound combines influences from areas such as noise music, avant-garde metal, grindcore, post-hardcore, and alternative rock among other genres. Most of the band's recordings make extensive use of dissonance and sampling, as well as unusual production techniques and psychedelic overtones. Lyrical themes include depression, warfare, violence, altered states of consciousness, and mental disorders.

== History ==
=== Formation and early years with AmRep (1992–1996) ===
The band was founded by guitarist Steve Austin and drummer Brad Elrod, who previously played together in Alien in the Land of Our Birth. The duo would move to Nashville, Tennessee in the early 1990s and would form Today Is the Day in March 1992 after meeting bassist Mike Herrell, who previously lived in Alabama. Today Is the Day released its debut demo EP, entitled How to Win Friends and Influence People, in 1992. This self-financed release garnered the attention of Amphetamine Reptile Records (also known as AmRep) who signed the band in February 1993. The full-length Supernova was released in April that year.

In September 1994, Today Is the Day saw its popularity in the metal underground increase with the release of their second album, entitled Willpower. That same year, Willpower was followed by the Clusterfuck '94 split EP with labelmates Chokebore and Guzzard. Today Is the Day also contributed to the tenth volume of AmRep's Dope Guns and Fucking in the Streets 7-inch series with Brainiac and Steel Pole Bath Tub.

Today Is the Day's self-titled album was released in March 1996. This album was the first of the band's releases recorded at Austin's own studio, Austin Enterprise, in Nashville. Today Is the Day was the band's final recording for AmRep.

=== Move to Relapse (1997–2004) ===
In 1997, Today Is the Day left AmRep and signed with Philadelphia-based metal label Relapse Records and released Temple of the Morning Star in September 1997. In addition to Temple of the Morning Star, Today Is the Day also contributed to the In These Black Days 7-inch series, released by Hydra Head Records, with their rendition of "Sabbath Bloody Sabbath", which can also be found as a secret track at the end of Temple of the Morning Star.

For Today Is the Day's July 1999 release, entitled In the Eyes of God, Austin brought on board bassist Bill Kelliher and drummer Brann Dailor, formerly of Rochester, New York's Lethargy and current members of Atlanta, Georgia's Mastodon. After moving to Massachusetts in 1998, In the Eyes of God was the first Today Is the Day album to be recorded at Austin Enterprise's new location in Clinton, Massachusetts.

The years 2000 and 2001 were relatively quiet for Today Is the Day in terms of releasing new material. Live Till You Die was released in August 2000 and included live tracks recorded during the tours in support of Temple of the Morning Star and In the Eyes of God, covers of songs by The Beatles, Bad Company, and Chris Isaak, and various songs compiled from studio sessions held at Austin Enterprise during the late 1990s. The band also recorded a cover of Metallica's "Nothing Else Matters", originally scheduled to be released on a split 7-inch vinyl titled Crush 'Em All through Undecided Records. The split was originally to be shared with Converge, and later with Supermachiner, but after falling through, Today Is the Day's song appeared on the Undecided Records various artists compilation The Old, the New, the Unreleased in 2005. In 2001, new Today Is the Day songs were released on splits with Metatron and 16, the first new material since 1999.

The new songs put out on the split releases later appeared on Today Is the Day's double album Sadness Will Prevail, released in 2002. For this album Austin chose to work with bassist Chris Debari and drummer Marshall Kilpatric. Today Is the Day also released their second live album entitled Blue Blood in 2002. The album includes live material from the Temple of the Morning Star era.

Today Is the Day returned in June 2004 with a new album entitled Kiss the Pig. Kiss the Pig was the last album released by Today Is the Day on Relapse Records.

=== Post-Relapse years (2005–2019) ===
In December 2006, it was announced that former Hate Eternal drummer Derek Roddy had joined the band and would appear on their next studio album, Axis of Eden. It was released in 2007 through SuperNova Records, a label originally set up by Steve Austin to reissue the band's out-of-print material.

In 2007, a feature-length film based on the album Axis of Eden was produced by director David Hall. The film made its debut on September 13, 2007, the first day of the Axis of Eden tour. Shows during that tour included the film being projected while the group performed. To promote the film and tour, a section of the movie that included the track "IED" was made available on the internet as a music video. A second video, directed by Tate Steinsek, consisted of live footage from the tour and was released online. The film would later be made available for purchase as a digital download on November 2, 2008.

In April 2010, it was confirmed Today Is the Day would join former labelmates Melvins, Boss Hog, and others at Amphetamine Reptile's 25th Anniversary celebration in Minneapolis on August 28, 2010. In July 2010 Black Market Activities Records announced that they were welcoming Today Is The Day to its roster. Black Market Activities released Today Is The Day's ninth studio album, Pain Is a Warning, in 2011. It was produced by Kurt Ballou of Converge.

In June 2014, Austin announced that Today Is The Day had joined Southern Lord Records for the release of its tenth studio album, Animal Mother, which was released on October 21 of that year. By late 2015, Steve Austin, along with Chris Spencer from Unsane, formed a new project called UXO, which also featured bassist Aarne Victorine and drummer Patrick Kennedy. Their debut self-titled album was released on January 29, 2016 through Reptilian Records.

On September 26, 2016, it was announced that Today Is The Day joined The End Records for the release of their eleventh studio album, which was expected to be released in 2017. The group also announced via their Facebook page that they planned to reissue almost their entire discography (including their debut self-issued How to Win Friends and Influence People demo) to coincide the 20th anniversary of Temple of the Morning Star.

On January 20, 2017, The End Records released the digital-only sampler album Silver Anniversary on music-streaming service Spotify, containing tracks from the band's first nine albums. A deluxe 20th-anniversary edition of Temple Of The Morning Star was also released on March 24, 2017 on 2CD and 2LP formats, which included rare and unreleased material. The deluxe reissue first became available for preorder in February 2017. The band announced a tour to celebrate the album's re-release and anniversary.

A European leg of the anniversary tour was announced, as well as a deluxe reissue of In the Eyes of God, which was released on September 22, 2017.

=== Recent activities (2019–present) ===
On December 12, 2019, Decibel Magazine premiered a new song titled "No Good to Anyone", the title track from the upcoming eleventh studio album by the band. The album was slated for release in February 2020 through BMG. On January 9, 2020, Revolver premiered "You're All Gonna Die", the second single to be released from the upcoming album. "Burn In Hell", the third single from the upcoming album, was released on February 13, with a music video produced to promote it. No Good to Anyone was released on February 28, 2020, and to promote the record, the band toured the United States with 16, Child Bite, and The Obsessed. However, due to the COVID-19 pandemic, the tour was cut short and most shows had to be cancelled. In 2021, it was announced that Austin had managed to purchase the rights to the band's entire catalog, which led to SuperNova Records reissuing the material as well as announcing a new album for 2022.

Mike Herrell died in September 2025.

== Musical style and influences ==
Today Is the Day has been associated by critics with noise rock as well as multiple subgenres of heavy metal music including avant-garde metal, math metal, doom metal, post-metal, extreme metal, and grindcore as well as blending "the doom-struck fury of hardcore, grindcore, and thrash metal" together "with the precision and melodic and rhythmic diversity of progressive and alternative rock." Post-hardcore and space rock has also been used to describe their sound in the past. Steve Austin of Today Is The Day is often credited as being one of the first few artists to combine noise rock with metal (a fusion sometimes called "noise metal"), and the band's first three albums with Amphetamine Reptile Records, Supernova, Willpower, and Today Is the Day, often receive high praise from critics for their style. Since their first two records with Relapse Records, Temple of the Morning Star and In the Eyes of God, the band evolved towards a more extreme and brutal sound, including prominent grindcore and black metal influences. Around that time, they also began to incorporate more experimentation into their music. This era of the band culminated in the double album Sadness Will Prevail, which is regarded as their most ambitious and experimental record.

The band is noted for its erratic sound and experimental approach. Sampling and electronics have played an important role in the band's music since Supernova. Their 1996 self-titled album lacked any bass guitars, using keyboards and featuring prominent noise and industrial influences. Dialogues and sound clips sampled from movies are also frequently used, mostly on Temple of the Morning Star and In the Eyes of God. Some of the movies sampled throughout their discography are Memento, The Illustrated Man, The Holy Mountain, Chopper, Rosemary's Baby, Dune, Goodfellas, Carrie, and Waco: The Rules of Engagement among others. The 2002 double album Sadness Will Prevail introduced string instruments and piano and also featured extensive electronics, field recordings, sound manipulation, acoustic guitars, sampling, and unusual production techniques. Some of the band's recordings display a more stripped down and straightforward approach with less use of electronics and experimentation, such as Kiss the Pig and Pain is a Warning. Most of Today Is The Day's albums are recorded and produced by Steve Austin in his own studio, Austin Enterprise, and the band's production often displays bizarre, unorthodox recording techniques and multiple special effects, notably the multi-layered vocals and dissonant guitar work.

Steve Austin has mentioned that the music and bands promoted by record labels such as Earache Records and Touch and Go Records played a major role in the development of the band's style. Some of the bands that Austin cited as major influences include Death, Slayer, Pink Floyd, King Crimson, Motörhead, U2, Napalm Death, Butthole Surfers, Eyehategod, Miles Davis, Morbid Angel, Unsane, Melvins, Bauhaus, and the Jesus Lizard. The band is considered by critics as an important part of the development of metal-related music during the mid to late 1990s. Last Rites editor Andrew Edmunds mentioned in his review of Supernova how it "would lay the groundwork for a seemingly never-ending wave of spastic metal bands". Patrick Kennedy of allmusic described Supernova as a "landmark recording". In 2017, Decibel Magazine included Temple of the Morning Star in their "Hall of Fame" list.

Groups that have named Today Is the Day as an influence include Training for Utopia, Hatebreed, The Dillinger Escape Plan, Kittie, Deadguy, and Tantrum of the Muse.

== Media appearances ==
The band made a cameo in the 1999 dark comedy independent film Duck! The Carbine High Massacre. In the scene, the group performed at a religious after-school club after its leaders mistook them for a Christian rock band. The 2006 film Threat featured a remixed version of the track "Willpower" by producer Darph/Nadar. Steve Austin was featured in the Amphetamine Reptile documentary film The Color of Noise. In 2017, a documentary based on Steve Austin and his life as a musician was released titled The Man Who Loves To Hurt Himself. The documentary, directed by Anthony Short, premiered in France in May 2017 at the International Filmmaker Festival of World Cinema. Short was nominated for the awards for Best Director and Best New Filmmaker.

== SuperNova Records ==
In 2006, Steve Austin launched his own record label, SuperNova Records, which was founded in order to properly release material by Today Is the Day among others. As of April 2007, SuperNova has released DVDs of live Today Is the Day shows from 1995 and 1996 as well as reissued a remastered version of Willpower, previously released by Amphetamine Reptile Records. The label also released a film, Axis of Eden, based on the album of the same name. The label became inactive when the band signed to Black Market Activities in 2010. In 2021, the label was resurrected after Austin retained the masters to the bands music so as to reissue the discography on streaming platforms.

== Members ==
Current

- Steve Austin – lead vocals, guitars, keyboards, bass (1992–present)
- Thomas Jack – bass, keyboards (2020–present)
- Colin Frecknall – drums (2022–present)

== Discography ==
=== Studio albums ===
- Supernova (1993)
- Willpower (1994)
- Today Is the Day (1996)
- Temple of the Morning Star (1997)
- In the Eyes of God (1999)
- Sadness Will Prevail (2002)
- Kiss the Pig (2004)
- Axis of Eden (2007)
- Pain Is a Warning (2011)
- Animal Mother (2014)
- No Good to Anyone (2020)
- Never Give In (2025)
