= List of Overkill band members =

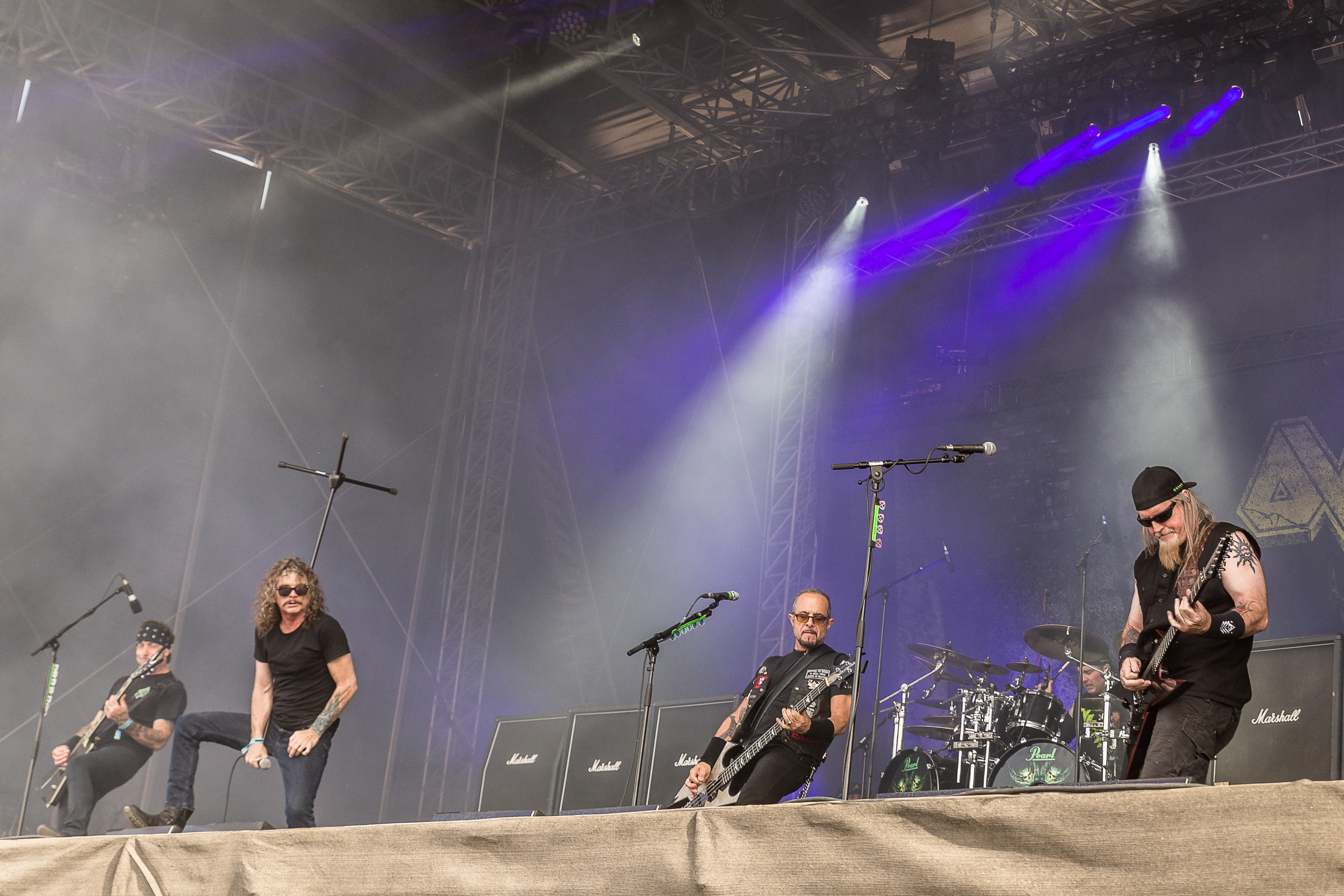
Overkill performing in 2019.

Overkill is an American thrash metal band from Old Bridge Township, New Jersey. Formed in 1980, the group was co-founded by bassist Carlo "D.D." Verni and drummer Lee "Rat Skates" Kundrat, with vocalist Bobby "Blitz" Ellsworth and guitarist Robert "Riff Thunder" Pisarek joining afterwards. The current lineup of Overkill features Verni and Ellsworth alongside lead guitarist Dave Linsk (since 1999) and rhythm guitarist Derek Tailer (since 2001).

== History ==
Overkill was formed in 1980 by D.D. Verni and Rat Skates, with Bobby "Blitz" Ellsworth and Robert Pisarek joining afterwards. During 1981, Dan Spitz and Anthony Ammendola took over on guitars. In 1982, Spitz and Ammendola were replaced by Rich Conte and Mike Sherry, before Bobby Gustafson took over as the band's sole guitarist before the end of the year. After the band released its first two albums Feel the Fire and Taking Over, Skates left in December 1987. He was replaced by Robert "Sid" Falck, formerly of Paul Di'Anno's Battlezone. The new lineup issued Under the Influence in 1988 and The Years of Decay in 1989, before Gustafson parted ways after an argument with Verni regarding an upcoming show he wanted to play. To replace the guitarist, Overkill returned to a five-piece lineup with the additions of Rob Cannavino and Merritt Gant.

During the promotional tour for Horrorscope in 1992, Falck left the band to pursue other musical styles and was replaced by former M.O.D. drummer Tim Mallare. The new incarnation released I Hear Black, W.F.O. and live album Wrecking Your Neck, before Cannavino and Gant were replaced by Sebastian Marino and Joe Comeau. Marino recorded The Killing Kind, From the Underground and Below and Necroshine, before leaving in March 1999. He was replaced by Dave Linsk, who debuted on the covers album Coverkill. After a European tour in early 2000, Comeau left Overkill to join headliner Annihilator as its new lead vocalist, but returned after the remaining four-piece recorded Bloodletting that summer. By early 2001, Comeau had left again and been replaced on tour by Derek Tailer.

After releasing Wrecking Everything, Killbox 13 and ReliXIV, Overkill changed drummers in May 2005 when Mallare was replaced by Ron Lipnicki. The new lineup remained stable for over ten years, before the band's road crew member Eddy Garcia temporarily replaced Lipnicki on tour from April 2016, after he was "forced to stay home due to undisclosed family issues". By May 2017, Lipnicki had been replaced on a permanent basis by Flotsam and Jetsam drummer Jason Bittner. The new lineup released The Wings of War in 2019. Bittner departed in August 2024 due to scheduling issues. His replacement was Jeramie Kling (ex-Venom Inc.).

== Members ==
=== Current ===
Image	Name	Years active	Instruments	Release contributions
	D.D. Verni	1980–present	bass; backing vocals	all Overkill releases
	Bobby "Blitz" Ellsworth	1980–present	lead vocals	all Overkill releases
	Dave Linsk	1999–present	lead guitar; backing vocals	all Overkill releases from Coverkill (1999) onwards
	Derek Tailer	2001–present	rhythm guitar; backing vocals	all Overkill releases from Wrecking Everything: An Evening in Asbury Park (2002) onwards
	Jeramie Kling	2024–present	drums	none to date

=== Former ===
Image	Name	Years active	Instruments	Release contributions
	Lee "Rat Skates" Kundrat	1980–1987	drums	all Overkill releases from Power in Black (1983) to Fuck You (1987)
	Robert "Riff Thunder" Pisarek	1980–1981	lead and rhythm guitar	none
	Anthony Ammendola	1981	rhythm guitar	none
	Dan Spitz	1981	lead guitar	none
	Rich Conte	1981–1982	lead guitar	none
	Mike Sherry	1981–1982	lead and rhythm guitars	none
	Joe	1982	lead and rhythm guitars	none
	Bobby Gustafson	1982–1990	lead and rhythm guitar; backing vocals	all Overkill releases from Power in Black (1983) to The Years of Decay (1989)
	Robert "Sid" Falck	1987–1992	drums	all Overkill releases from Under the Influence (1988) to Horrorscope (1991); Coverkill (1999)
	Rob Cannavino	1990–1995	lead and rhythm guitar; backing vocals	Horrorscope (1991); I Hear Black (1993); W.F.O. (1994); Wrecking Your Neck (1995); Coverkill (1999)
	Merritt Gant	1991–1995	lead and rhythm guitar; backing vocals	Horrorscope (1991); I Hear Black (1993); W.F.O. (1994); Wrecking Your Neck (1995); Coverkill (1999)
	Tim Mallare	1992–2005	drums	all Overkill releases from I Hear Black (1993) to ReliXIV (2005)
	Joe Comeau	1995–2000; 2000–2001	rhythm guitar; backing vocals	all Overkill releases from The Killing Kind (1996) to Coverkill (1999)
	Sebastian Marino	1995–1999 (died 2023)	lead guitar	all Overkill releases from The Killing Kind (1996) to Coverkill (1999)
	Ron Lipnicki	2005–2017	drums	all Overkill releases from Immortalis (2007) to The Grinding Wheel (2017); The Wings of War (2019)
	Jason Bittner	2017–2024	drums	The Wings of War (2019); Scorched (2023)

=== Touring ===
Image	Name	Years active	Instruments	Details
	Eddy Garcia	2012; 2016–2017	drums	Garcia temporarily replaced Lipnicki on the 70000 Tons of Metal cruise in 2012, and later from April 2016.
	Waldemar Sorychta	2016	lead guitar	Sorychta stepped in for lead guitarist Linsk on a European tour in late 2016 for undisclosed reasons.
	Phil Demmel	2021–2023	lead guitar	Demmel played one show with Overkill in place of Linsk in November 2021, due to scheduling conflicts. He continued to do so their 2022 spring tour with Prong.
	David Ellefson	2024	bass; backing vocals	Ellefson played bass for the band on their "Scorching Latin America 2024" tour while Verni was recovering from shoulder surgery.
	Christian "Speesy" Giesler	2024	bass; backing vocals	Giesler joined the band for a European tour.
	Christian Olde Wolbers	2024; 2026	bass; backing vocals	Wolbers joined the band for a North American tour., and again in the Thrash Of The Titans Tour March-April 2026, and also for the European tour June-August 2026.

== Lineups ==
Period	Members	Releases
1980–1981	D.D. Verni – bass; Rat Skates – drums; Bobby Blitz – lead vocals; Riff Thunder – guitars	none
1981	D.D. Verni – bass; Rat Skates – drums; Bobby Blitz – lead vocals; Dan Spitz – lead guitar; Anthony Ammendola – rhythm guitar	none
1981–1982	D.D. Verni – bass; Rat Skates – drums; Bobby Blitz – lead vocals; Rich Conte – guitars; Mike Sherry – guitars	none
Late 1982 – December 1987	D.D. Verni – bass, backing vocals; Rat Skates – drums; Bobby Blitz – lead vocals; Joe – guitars (1982); Bobby Gustafson – guitars, backing vocals	Power in Black (1983); Rotten to the Core (1984); Feel the Fire (1985); Metal Hammer Roadshow 1 (1986); Taking Over (1987); Fuck You (1987); Live to the Core (1992)
December 1987 – late 1990	D.D. Verni – bass, backing vocals; Bobby Blitz – lead vocals; Bobby Gustafson – guitars, backing vocals; Sid Falck – drums	Under the Influence (1988); The Years of Decay (1989); Sexy Flexi (1990)
Late 1990 – March 1991	D.D. Verni – bass, backing vocals; Bobby Blitz – lead vocals; Sid Falck – drums; Rob Cannavino – guitars, backing vocals	none
March 1991 – summer 1992	D.D. Verni – bass, backing vocals; Bobby Blitz – lead vocals; Sid Falck – drums; Rob Cannavino – guitars, backing vocals; Merritt Gant – guitars, backing vocals	Horrorscope (1991)
Summer 1992 – summer 1995	D.D. Verni – bass, backing vocals; Bobby Blitz – lead vocals; Rob Cannavino – guitars, backing vocals; Merritt Gant – guitars, backing vocals; Tim Mallare – drums	I Hear Black (1993); W.F.O. (1994); Wrecking Your Neck (1995)
Summer 1995 – March 1999	D.D. Verni – bass, backing vocals; Bobby Blitz – lead vocals; Tim Mallare – drums; Sebastian Marino – lead guitar; Joe Comeau – rhythm guitar, backing vocals	The Killing Kind (1996); From the Underground and Below (1997); Necroshine (1999); Coverkill (1999) – three tracks
Spring 1999 – spring 2000	D.D. Verni – bass, backing vocals; Bobby Blitz – lead vocals; Tim Mallare – drums; Joe Comeau – rhythm guitar, backing vocals; Dave Linsk – lead guitar, backing vocals	Coverkill (1999) – remaining tracks
Mid – late 2000	D.D. Verni – bass, backing vocals; Bobby Blitz – lead vocals; Tim Mallare – drums; Dave Linsk – guitars, backing vocals	Bloodletting (2000)
Late 2000 – early 2001	D.D. Verni – bass, backing vocals; Bobby Blitz – lead vocals; Tim Mallare – drums; Dave Linsk – lead guitar, backing vocals; Joe Comeau – rhythm guitar, backing vocals	none
Early 2001 – May 2005	D.D. Verni – bass, backing vocals; Bobby Blitz – lead vocals; Tim Mallare – drums; Dave Linsk – lead guitar, backing vocals; Derek Tailer – rhythm guitar, backing vocals	Wrecking Everything (2002); Killbox 13 (2003); ReliXIV (2005)
May 2005 – May 2017	D.D. Verni – bass, backing vocals; Bobby Blitz – lead vocals; Dave Linsk – lead guitar, backing vocals; Derek Tailer – rhythm guitar, backing vocals; Ron Lipnicki – drums	Immortalis (2007); Live at Wacken Open Air 2007 (2008); Ironbound (2010); The Electric Age (2013); Live from Oz (2013); White Devil Armory (2014); The Grinding Wheel (2017)
April 2016 – May 2017 (temporary touring lineup)	D.D. Verni – bass, backing vocals; Bobby Blitz – lead vocals; Dave Linsk – lead guitar, backing vocals; Derek Tailer – rhythm guitar, backing vocals; Eddy Garcia – drums (substitute)	Live in Overhausen (2018)
May 2017 – August 2024	D.D. Verni – bass, backing vocals; Bobby Blitz – lead vocals; Dave Linsk – lead guitar, backing vocals; Derek Tailer – rhythm guitar, backing vocals; Jason Bittner – drums	The Wings of War (2019); Scorched (2023)
August 2024 – present	D.D. Verni – bass, backing vocals; Bobby Blitz – lead vocals; Dave Linsk – lead guitar, backing vocals; Derek Tailer – rhythm guitar, backing vocals; Jeramie Kling – drums	none to date
