= Overkill discography =

American Band

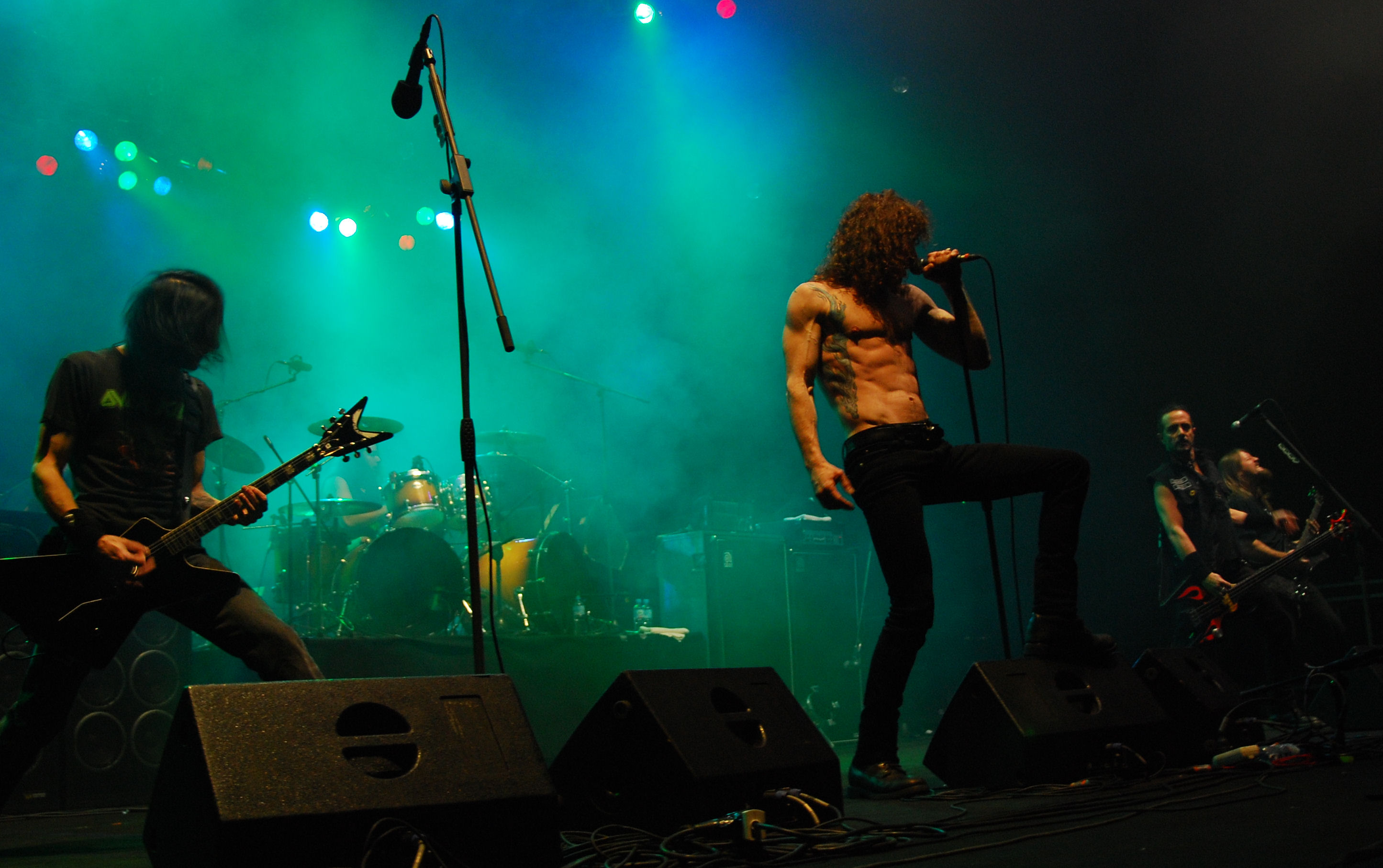
- Overkill live at Metalmania 2008
- Studio albums: 20
- Extended plays: 3
- Live albums: 3
- Compilation albums: 2
- Video albums: 2
- Music videos: 12
- Demos: 1
- Box sets: 2

The following is the discography of Overkill, an American thrash metal band formed in 1980 in New Jersey. The band has released twenty studio albums, three live albums, two compilation albums, three EPs and one box set. They were one of the early thrash metal bands to sign to a major label (Atlantic Records in 1986), and rose to fame as part of the genre's movement of the late 1980s, along with bands such as Anthrax, Exodus, Metallica, Megadeth, Slayer and Testament. In terms of chart positions and sales, the band's most successful records are Under the Influence (1988), The Years of Decay (1989), I Hear Black (1993), The Electric Age (2012), and White Devil Armory (2014), which debuted at No. 142, No. 155, No. 122, No. 77, and No. 31 respectively on the Billboard 200 chart. As of 2006, Overkill has sold over 625,000 albums in the US since the beginning of the SoundScan era, and over 5 million records worldwide throughout their career.

== Albums ==
=== Studio albums ===
Title	Album details	Peak chart positions									Sales
Title	Album details	US	GER	JPN	HUN	FIN	AUT	FRA	SWI	SWE	Sales
Feel the Fire	Released: October 15, 1985; Label: Megaforce	—	—	—	—	—	—	—	—	—	
Taking Over	Released: March 2, 1987; Label: Megaforce	191	—	—	—	—	—	—	—	—	
Under the Influence	Released: July 5, 1988; Label: Atlantic	142	42	—	—	—	—	—	—	—	
The Years of Decay	Released: October 13, 1989; Label: Atlantic	155	58	—	—	—	—	—	—	—	US: 67,000+
Horrorscope	Released: September 3, 1991; Label: Atlantic	—	—	—	—	—	—	—	—	—	US: 118,000+
I Hear Black	Released: March 9, 1993; Label: Atlantic	122	—	—	—	—	—	—	—	—	US: 70,000+
W.F.O.	Released: July 15, 1994; Label: Atlantic	—	93	—	—	—	—	—	—	—	
The Killing Kind	Released: March 5, 1996; Label: CMC	—	60	—	—	—	—	—	—	—	
From the Underground and Below	Released: September 30, 1997; Label: CMC	—	80	—	—	—	—	—	—	—	
Necroshine	Released: February 23, 1999; Label: CMC	—	82	—	—	—	—	—	—	—	US: 20,585+
Bloodletting	Released: October 24, 2000; Label: Metal-Is	—	—	—	—	—	—	—	—	—	
Killbox 13	Released: March 25, 2003; Label: Spitfire	—	93	—	—	—	—	—	—	—	
ReliXIV	Released: March 22, 2005; Label: Spitfire/Regain	—	—	—	—	—	—	—	—	—	US: 16,000+
Immortalis	Released: October 9, 2007; Label: Bodog Music	—	—	—	—	—	—	—	—	—	US: 2,800+
Ironbound	Released: February 9, 2010; Label: eOne Music	192	31	152	—	—	61	198	77	—	US: 4,100+
The Electric Age	Released: March 27, 2012; Label: eOne Music	77	34	89	35	30	73	155	62	41	US: 6,700+
White Devil Armory	Released: July 22, 2014; Label: eOne Music	31	20	91	28	28	53	—	31	—	US: 8,400+
The Grinding Wheel	Released: February 10, 2017; Label: Nuclear Blast	69	10	51	21	44	33	185	23	—	
The Wings of War	Released: February 22, 2019; Label: Nuclear Blast	158	5	—	—	—	23	153	13	—	
Scorched	Released: April 14, 2023; Label: Nuclear Blast	—	10	64	—	—	29	164	7	—	
"—" denotes a release that did not chart.

=== Live albums ===
Title	Album details	Peak chart positions
Title	Album details	GER
Wrecking Your Neck	Released: May 30, 1995; Label: CMC	65
Wrecking Everything	Released: June 18, 2002; Label: Spitfire	—
Live in Overhausen	Released: May 18, 2018; Label: Nuclear Blast	12

=== Compilation albums ===
Title	Album details	Sales
Fuck You and Then Some	Released: October 22, 1996; Label: Megaforce	
Coverkill	Released: October 26, 1999; Label: Steamhammer/SPV	US: 1,815+
Hello from the Gutter - the Best of Overkill	Released: September 10, 2002; Label: Steamhammer/SPV	

=== Box sets ===
Title	Album details
Historikill: 1995–2007	Released: October 16, 2015; Label: Nuclear Blast
The Atlantic Years 1986-1994	Released: October 29, 2021; Label: Atlantic Records

== Extended plays ==
Year	Title	Label
1985	Overkill	Azra/Metal Storm
1987	!!!Fuck You!!!	Megaforce
2012	6 Songs	Rock Hard
2013	Live from Oz	Nuclear Blast

== Demos ==
Title	Album details
Power in Black	Released: September 12, 1983; Label: Self-released

== Videos ==
=== Video albums ===
Title	Album details	
Videoscope	Released: November 1991; Label: Atlantic; Formats: VHS	
Wrecking Everything - An Evening in Asbury Park	Released: September 24, 2002; Label: Spitfire; Formats: DVD	US: 6,300+
Live at Wacken Open Air 2007	Released: February 5, 2008; Label: Bodog Music; Formats: DVD	

=== Music videos ===
Year	Title	Director	Album
1987	"In Union We Stand"	—	Taking Over
1988	"Hello from the Gutter"	—	Under the Influence
1989	"Elimination"	—	The Years of Decay
1991	"Horroscope"	—	Horrorscope
1991	"Thanx for Nothin"	—	Horrorscope
1993	"Spiritual Void"	Simeon Soffer	I Hear Black
1994	"Fast Junkie"	—	W.F.O.
1995	"Bastard Nation" (live)	—	Wrecking Your Neck
1997	"Long Time Dyin'"	—	From the Underground and Below
2007	"Skull and Bones" (featuring Randy Blythe)	Kevin Custer	Immortalis
2010	"Bring Me the Night"	Kevin Custer	Ironbound
2012	"Electric Rattlesnake"	Kevin Custer	The Electric Age
2014	"Armorist"	Kevin Custer	White Devil Armory
2014	"Bitter Pill"	Kevin Custer	White Devil Armory
2016	"Our Finest Hour" (lyric video)	—	The Grinding Wheel
2016	"Mean, Green, Killing Machine" (lyric video)	—	The Grinding Wheel
2017	"Goddamn Trouble"	Kevin Custer	The Grinding Wheel
2017	"Shine On"	Kevin Custer	The Grinding Wheel
2018	"Hammerhead" (live)	—	Live in Overhausen
2018	"Thanx for Nothing" (live)	—	Live in Overhausen
2018	"Second Son" (live)	—	Live in Overhausen
2018	"Last Man Standing" (lyric video)	—	The Wings of War
2019	"Head of a Pin" (lyric video)	—	The Wings of War
2019	"Welcome to the Garden State"	Tommy Jones	The Wings of War
2023	"Scorched"	David Brodsky	Scorched
