= Historikill: 1995–2007 =

2015 boxset by Overkill

Box set by Overkill
- Released: October 16, 2015
- Recorded: 1995–2007
- Genre: Thrash metal
- Label: Nuclear Blast

Overkill chronology
White Devil Armory (2014)	Historikill: 1995–2007 (2015)	The Grinding Wheel (2017)

Historikill: 1995–2007 is a compact disc box set by thrash metal band Overkill, which was released on October 16, 2015. The originally planned release date was September 18, 2015. The box set spans the years from 1995 to 2007, including seven of the original seventeen Overkill albums from The Killing Kind (1996) to Immortalis (2007), two of their live albums (Wrecking Your Neck and Wrecking Everything), one of their compilation albums (Hello from the Gutter: The Best of Overkill), the covers album Coverkill and a bonus disc featuring demos, remixes and one cover song. The albums are placed in chronological order, although Wrecking Everything was released three months before the Hello from the Gutter compilation album.

Professional ratings
Review scores
Source	Rating
Metal Hammer	4/5 stars

== Track listing ==
All songs were written by Bobby "Blitz" Ellsworth and D.D. Verni except where noted.

CD 1: Wrecking Your Neck Disk 1
No.	Title	Length
1.	"Where It Hurts"	7:26
2.	"Infectious"	4:05
3.	"Coma"	3:59
4.	"Supersonic Hate"	4:43
5.	"Wrecking Crew"	1:09
6.	"Powersurge"	4:13
7.	"The Wait/New High in Lows"	6:10
8.	"Skullkrusher"	6:23
9.	"Spiritual Void"	4:52
10.	"Hello From the Gutter"	2:35
11.	"Anxiety" (Instrumental)	1:50
12.	"Elimination"	5:07
13.	"Fast Junkie"	4:04
14.	"World of Hurt"	4:59
Total length:		61:42

CD 2: Wrecking Your Neck Disk 2
No.	Title	Length
1.	"Gasoline Dream"	7:40
2.	"Rotten to the Core"	5:38
3.	"Horrorscope"	5:58
4.	"Under One"	3:54
5.	"New Machine"	4:21
6.	"Thanx for Nothing"	5:03
7.	"Bastard Nation"	5:57
8.	"Fuck You/War Pigs"	7:03
Total length:		45:38

CD 3: The Killing Kind
No.	Title	Length
1.	"Battle"	4:31
2.	"God-Like"	4:11
3.	"Certifiable"	3:25
4.	"Burn You Down/To Ashes"	6:47
5.	"Let Me Shut That for You"	5:19
6.	"Bold Face Pagan Stomp"	5:42
7.	"Feeding Frenzy" (Instrumental)	4:13
8.	"The Cleansing"	5:50
9.	"The Mourning After/Private Bleeding"	4:36
10.	"Cold, Hard Fact"	5:19
Total length:		49:56

CD 4: From the Underground and Below
No.	Title	Length
1.	"It Lives"	4:31
2.	"Save Me"	4:56
3.	"Long Time Dyin'"	4:53
4.	"Genocya"	4:46
5.	"Half Past Dead"	5:29
6.	"F.U.C.T."	4:56
7.	"I'm Alright"	5:49
8.	"The Rip n' Tear"	4:18
9.	"Promises"	4:49
10.	"Little Bit o' Murder"	4:09
Total length:		47:07

CD 5: Necroshine
No.	Title	Length
1.	"Necroshine"	6:03
2.	"My December"	5:01
3.	"Let Us Prey"	6:40
4.	"80 Cycles"	5:50
5.	"Revelation"	4:39
6.	"Stone Cold Jesus"	5:19
7.	"Forked Tongue Kiss"	4:02
8.	"I Am Fear"	4:30
9.	"Black Line"	4:43
10.	"Dead Man"	4:16
Total length:		51:03

CD 6: Coverkill
No.	Title	Writer(s)	Length
1.	"Overkill (live)" (Originally released on the Overkill album)	Motörhead	4:16
2.	"No Feelings" (Originally released on the Never Mind the Bollocks, Here's the Sex Pistols album)	Sex Pistols	2:37
3.	"Hymn 43" (Originally released on the Aqualung album)	Jethro Tull	2:59
4.	"Changes" (Originally released on the Black Sabbath, Vol. 4 album)	Black Sabbath	4:58
5.	"Space Truckin'" (Originally released on the Machine Head album)	Deep Purple	4:00
6.	"Deuce" (Originally released on the Kiss album)	Kiss	3:05
7.	"Never Say Die!" (Originally released on the Never Say Die! album)	Black Sabbath	3:24
8.	"Death Tone" (Originally released on the Battle Hymns album)	Manowar	4:24
9.	"Cornucopia" (Originally released on the Black Sabbath, Vol. 4 album)	Black Sabbath	4:46
10.	"Tyrant" (Originally released on the Sad Wings of Destiny album)	Judas Priest	4:00
11.	"Ain't Nothin' to Do" (Originally released on the Young, Loud and Snotty album)	Dead Boys	2:13
12.	"I'm Against It" (Originally released on the Road to Ruin album)	Ramones	2:43
Total length:			43:22

CD 7: Bloodletting
No.	Title	Length
1.	"Thunderhead"	5:39
2.	"Bleed Me"	4:30
3.	"What I'm Missin'"	4:36
4.	"Death Comes Out to Play"	5:02
5.	"Let It Burn"	5:18
6.	"I, Hurricane"	5:04
7.	"Left Hand Man"	6:10
8.	"Blown Away"	6:43
9.	"My Name Is Pain"	4:17
10.	"Can't Kill a Dead Man"	4:05
Total length:		51:32

CD 8: Hello from the Gutter: The Best of Overkill Disk 1
No.	Title	Length
1.	"Hello From The Gutter" (Live)	2:35
2.	"Necroshine"	6:01
3.	"God-Like"	4:11
4.	"Powersurge" (Live)	4:12
5.	"Never Say Die" (Black Sabbath cover)	3:25
6.	"Coma" (Live)	3:59
7.	"The Rip N'Tear"	4:18
8.	"Battle"	4:31
9.	"Electro-Violence" (Live)	3:50
10.	"Thunderhead"	5:39
11.	"Overkill"	3:36
12.	"Fuck You" (Subhumans cover)	2:20
Total length:		48:21

CD 9: Hello from the Gutter: The Best of Overkill Disk 2
No.	Title	Length
1.	"Rotten to the Core"	4:58
2.	"Bleed Me"	4:30
3.	"Long Time Dyin'"	4:53
4.	"Fatal If Swallowed"	6:20
5.	"Elimination" (Live)	4:57
6.	"Black Line"	4:43
7.	"Overkill" (Motörhead)	4:16
8.	"World Of Hurt" (Live)	4:53
9.	"Hammerhead"	4:00
10.	"Skullcrusher" (Live)	6:19
11.	"Kill at Command"	4:47
12.	"Bastard Nation" (Live)	5:57
Total length:		60:25

CD 10: Wrecking Everything
No.	Title	Length
1.	"Necroshine"	5:56
2.	"Thunderhead"	6:22
3.	"E.vil N.ever D.ies"	4:42
4.	"Deny the Cross"	5:11
5.	"I Hate"	3:54
6.	"Shred"	3:55
7.	"Bleed Me"	4:28
8.	"Long Time Dyin'"	7:23
9.	"It Lives"	4:26
10.	"Battle"	5:28
11.	"The Years of Decay"	9:51
12.	"In Union We Stand"	5:09
13.	"Overkill"	4:02
Total length:		70:52

CD 11: Killbox 13
No.	Title	Length
1.	"Devil by the Tail"	5:24
2.	"Damned"	4:13
3.	"No Lights"	5:52
4.	"The One"	4:58
5.	"Crystal Clear"	5:03
6.	"The Sound of Dying"	4:56
7.	"Until I Die"	5:20
8.	"Struck Down"	4:42
9.	"Unholy"	4:40
10.	"I Rise"	5:08
Total length:		50:22

CD 12: ReliXIV
No.	Title	Length
1.	"Within Your Eyes"	6:06
2.	"Love"	5:40
3.	"Loaded Rack"	4:43
4.	"Bats in the Belfry"	4:47
5.	"A Pound of Flesh"	3:37
6.	"Keeper"	5:12
7.	"Wheelz"	5:10
8.	"The Mark"	5:54
9.	"Play the Ace"	5:34
10.	"Old School"	3:51
Total length:		50:39

CD 13: Immortalis
No.	Title	Length
1.	"Devils in the Mist"	4:34
2.	"What It Takes"	4:28
3.	"Skull and Bones" (featuring Randy Blythe from Lamb of God)	5:54
4.	"Shadow of a Doubt"	4:51
5.	"Hellish Pride"	5:16
6.	"Walk Through Fire"	4:08
7.	"Head On"	5:21
8.	"Chalie Get Your Gun"	4:28
9.	"Hell Is"	4:40
10.	"Overkill V... The Brand"	5:36
Total length:		49:22

CD 14: Bonus disc
No.	Title	Length
1.	"Blood Money" (Demo)
2.	"Horrorscope" (Demo)
3.	"Soulitude" (Demo)
4.	"Killogy" (Demo)
5.	"Old School" (Remix)
6.	"Skull and Bones" (Remix)
7.	"Under One" (Tracking Mix)
8.	"Man in Black" (Johnny Cash cover)
