= The Wings of War =

2019 studio album by Overkill

Studio album by Overkill
- Released: February 22, 2019
- Recorded: June–October 2018
- Studios: Gear Recording Studio, Shrewsbury, New Jersey; SKH Recording Studios, Stuart, Florida; JRod Productions, Pomona, New York; Shorefire Recording Studios, Long Branch, New Jersey
- Genre: Thrash metal
- Length: 51:03
- Label: Nuclear Blast
- Producer: Overkill

Overkill chronology
| The Grinding Wheel (2017) | The Wings of War (2019) | Scorched (2023) |

Singles from The Wings of War
- 1. "Last Man Standing" Released: December 14, 2018; 2. "Head of a Pin" Released: January 18, 2019; 3. "Welcome to the Garden State" Released: February 22, 2019

The Wings of War is the nineteenth studio album by thrash metal band Overkill, released on February 22, 2019. It is the band's first album to feature drummer Jason Bittner, making it their first one without Ron Lipnicki since ReliXIV (2005), as he had left Overkill shortly after the release of its predecessor The Grinding Wheel (2017).

== Production ==
About a year after the release of The Grinding Wheel, Overkill announced that they were in the studio working on demos for their nineteenth studio album. Two months later, Bittner announced on his Facebook page that they were "in pre-production" for the album, writing, "And were in pre production this week.......been awhile since I dusted the 'ol Rolands off but we're pressed for space..."

When asked in an April 2018 interview with Jimmy Kay of Canada's The Metal Voice what fans could expect to hear from the album, frontman Bobby "Blitz" Ellsworth stated, "I think we caught a wave on the last four records. Part of that wave was Ron Lipnicki behind the drums, and Ron is now gone, so I don't know what to expect. But the beauty of it is that when you're inside the writing team, that's what becomes motivational. Now, obviously, it's gonna be a heavy metal record; we don't deviate so much from our formula, but what is that record gonna sound like? At this point, it sounds like a metal record to me. I think Jason Bittner's addition to the band is gonna make it bombastic in some cases; he's the state of the art when it comes to hitting the skins. So I really think that we have an opportunity here to make something that is great. Who knows? It could be a new chapter, and somewhere in that realm of unknown is what excites me now." Ellsworth also stated that the album was expected to be released in February 2019, and ten songs were written "but they're all up for change. The way we kind of write is it evolves from a riff and then it becomes a song and then it becomes arranged."

On June 1, 2018, the band announced that they had begun recording their nineteenth studio album. During an interview with Eddie Trunk on Trunk Nation on October 10, 2018, bassist D. D. Verni announced that the album was finished; he was quoted as saying, "I just got the final sequencing and all that, so that's all buttoned up. We're working on the cover now. We still don't have a title — we're gonna have to come up with that soon — but we have a lot of things floating around. And the new release will probably be in February."

On November 28, 2018, Overkill announced that their nineteenth studio album was titled The Wings of War and would be released on February 22, 2019. On the making of the album, Ellsworth stated: "It was a blast making The Wings of War! It is something old feeling new again, as our chemistry was altered by the addition of Jason Bittner. I was curious from the get-go, how would it pan out? I think what we accomplished here is a new, upgraded Overkill that embraced the new chemistry, while taking our roots into the present. The new formula produced not only more raw power, but more places to go with melody, a win, win. The key is being not only interested in the change, but part of it. I'll tell you what, it's still fun as hell making Overkill records."

On January 3, 2019, the band released the first trailer of the album in the form of a documentary series entitled "Welcome to the Garden State", which tells about the history of the band. On January 28, 2019, the band announced the Wings over the USA tour, which began on April 25 in Baltimore and included support by Death Angel and Act of Defiance.

== Critical reception ==
Professional ratings
Review scores
| Source | Rating |
|---|---|
| Blabbermouth.net | 7.5/10 |
| KNAC | 4/5 |
| Metal Injection | 7.5/10 |
| Metal Hammer (GER) | 5.5/7 |
| Metal Hammer (UK) | 8/10 |
| Rock Hard | 8.5/10 |

The Wings of War has received positive reviews by music critics. Blabbermouth.net writer Jay H. Gorania gave the album a rating of seven-and-a-half out of ten, and called it "everything that longtime fans would hope for." He concluded his review, writing, "It's an impressive feat for an aging thrash metal band to release one of its best efforts three decades into the game, and that's exactly what they did with 2010's Ironbound. Now, the band is nearly 40 years old, and even though The Wings of War doesn't quite pack Ironbound's punch, it is marginally better than the three albums sandwiched between the two: The Electric Age, White Devil Armory and The Grinding Wheel. While The Wings of War isn't essential nor mandatory listening, per se, it's most certainly good and entertaining, and it serves as a fine soundtrack for working out or getting ready for a night on the town."

Nathan Dufour from KNAC.com gave The Wings of War a rating of four out of five and called it "a sparkling gem," while Agoraphobic News referred to it as Overkill's best album since Ironbound. Loudwire named it one of the 50 best metal albums of 2019.

Despite receiving positive reviews, The Wings of War was considered something of a commercial disappointment in light of its predecessors—The Electric Age, White Devil Armory and The Grinding Wheel—having entered the top 100 on the Billboard 200. The album peaked at number 158 on the chart, making it Overkill's third lowest chart position behind Taking Over and Ironbound. However, The Wings of War was well-received in Europe, particularly on the German charts where it debuted at number five, making it Overkill's highest-ever chart position.

== Track listing ==
All tracks are written by D. D. Verni and Bobby Ellsworth.

| No. | Title | Length |
|---|---|---|
| 1. | "Last Man Standing" | 5:49 |
| 2. | "Believe in the Fight" | 5:03 |
| 3. | "Head of a Pin" | 5:56 |
| 4. | "Batshitcrazy" | 4:33 |
| 5. | "Distortion" | 6:09 |
| 6. | "A Mother's Prayer" | 3:58 |
| 7. | "Welcome to the Garden State" | 4:42 |
| 8. | "Where Few Dare to Walk" | 5:25 |
| 9. | "Out on the Road-Kill" | 4:41 |
| 10. | "Hole in My Soul" | 4:47 |
| Total length: | | 51:03 |

CD bonus track
| No. | Title | Length |
|---|---|---|
| 11. | "In Ashes" | 5:35 |
| Total length: | | 56:38 |

== Personnel ==
Overkill

- Bobby "Blitz" Ellsworth – vocals
- D. D. Verni – bass
- Dave Linsk – lead guitar
- Derek Tailer – rhythm guitar
- Jason Bittner – drums

Production

- Overkill – production
- Zeuss – mixing, mastering

Artwork and design

- Travis Smith – cover art, layout

== Charts ==
| Chart (2019) | Peak position |
|---|---|
| Austrian Albums (Ö3 Austria) | 23 |
| Belgian Albums (Ultratop Wallonia) | 99 |
| Czech Albums (ČNS IFPI) | 78 |
| French Albums (SNEP) | 153 |
| German Albums (Offizielle Top 100) | 5 |
| Italian Albums (FIMI) | 99 |
| Scottish Albums (Official Charts) | 30 |
| Swiss Albums (Schweizer Hitparade) | 13 |
| US Billboard 200 | 158 |
| US Independent Albums (Billboard) | 3 |
| US Top Hard Rock Albums (Billboard) | 9 |
| US Top Rock Albums (Billboard) | 28 |
