= Live at Wacken Open Air 2007 =

Video by Overkill
- Released: February 5, 2008
- Recorded: August 2, 2007
- Venue: Wacken Open Air, Germany
- Genre: Thrash metal
- Length: 50:00
- Label: Bodog Music

Overkill chronology
Wrecking Everything (2002)	Live at Wacken Open Air 2007 (2008)

Professional ratings
Review scores
Source	Rating
Blabbermouth.net	(8/10)
Blogcritics	3/5 stars
Exclaim!	(mixed)

Live at Wacken Open Air 2007 is the third video album by thrash metal band Overkill, released on February 5, 2008 through Bodog Music.

== Track listing ==
All songs written by Overkill, except *.

1. "Rotten To The Core"
2. "Elimination"
3. "Necroshine"
4. "Thanx For Nothin'"
5. "Skull and Bones"
6. "In Union We Stand"
7. "Walk Through Fire"
8. "Wrecking Crew "
9. "Old School"
10. "Fuck You"* (Subhumans cover)

== Personnel ==
- Bobby Ellsworth - lead vocals
- D.D. Verni - bass, backing vocals
- Dave Linsk - lead guitar, backing vocals
- Derek Tailer - rhythm guitar, backing vocals
- Ron Lipnicki - drums
