= Under the Influence (Overkill album) =

1988 studio album by Overkill

Studio album by Overkill
- Released: July 5, 1988
- Recorded: March–April 1988
- Studios: Pyramid Studios, Ithaca, New York
- Genre: Thrash metal
- Length: 47:51
- Labels: Megaforce, Atlantic
- Producers: Overkill, Alex Perialas

Overkill chronology
!!!Fuck You!!! (1987)	Under the Influence (1988)	The Years of Decay (1989)

Singles from Under the Influence
- 1. "Hello from the Gutter" Released: 1988; 2. "Head First" Released: 1988

Under the Influence is the third studio album by thrash metal band Overkill, released on July 5, 1988 through Megaforce Records and Atlantic Records. This was Overkill's first album to feature drummer Sid Falck, who had replaced Rat Skates when the latter left the band in 1987 during the Taking Over tour.

== Music ==
Under the Influence is musically a thrash metal album and also draws from punk rock on some tracks. The music is considered to be technically proficient. Ellsworth's heavy metal singing is considered to be cartoonish and "over the top" in nature by AllMusic. The site described Verni's bass playing as sounding "clanky, ringing and exaggerated".

== Touring and promotion ==
Overkill toured for six months to promote Under the Influence, touring alongside thrash acts Nuclear Assault, M.O.D., Destruction and Testament. From October to December 1988, the band toured the United States with Slayer and Motörhead, followed by a European tour with Slayer and Nuclear Assault, which took place in January 1989.

== Reception and legacy ==
Professional ratings
Review scores
Source	Rating
AllMusic	3/5 stars

Jason Anderson at AllMusic awarded Under the Influence three stars out of five, calling it "another confident, if unremarkable Overkill recording", while listing "Overkill III (Under the Influence)", "Shred", "Never Say Never" and "Hello from the Gutter" as highlights. The album reached No. 142 on the U.S. Billboard 200 and remained on that chart for thirteen weeks, making it Overkill's longest Billboard run. It is also their third highest-charting album to date, with over 300,000 copies sold worldwide as of 1997.

In 2021, Simon Young of Kerrang! included the album on his list compiling "50 of the worst album covers ever".

== Track listing ==
All tracks are written by Bobby Gustafson, D.D. Verni and Bobby "Blitz" Ellsworth.

No.	Title	Length
1.	"Shred"	4:05
2.	"Never Say Never"	4:58
3.	"Hello from the Gutter"	4:14
4.	"Mad Gone World"	4:31
5.	"Brainfade"	4:08
6.	"Drunken Wisdom"	6:17
7.	"End of the Line"	7:03
8.	"Head First"	6:02
9.	"Overkill III (Under the Influence)"	6:33
Total length:		47:51

== Personnel ==
- Bobby "Blitz" Ellsworth – lead vocals
- D.D. Verni – bass, backing vocals
- Bobby Gustafson – guitars, backing vocals
- Sid Falck – drums

Additional personnel

- Overkill – production
- Alex Perialas – engineering, production
- Rob Hunter – engineering assistance
- Michael Wagener – mixing
- Lori Fumar – mixing assistance
- George Marino – mastering
- Jon Zazula, Marsha Zazula – executive production
- Dan Muro, Pat Calello – art direction
- Rich Larson, Steve Fastner – cover illustration

== Charts ==
Chart (1988)	Peak position
Finnish Albums (The Official Finnish Charts)	10
German Albums (Offizielle Top 100)	42
US Billboard 200	142
