= Power in Black =

1983 demo by Overkill

Studio album (Demo) by Overkill
- Released: 1983
- Recorded: March–September 1983
- Genre: Thrash metal, speed metal
- Length: 18:06
- Label: Self released
- Producer: Overkill

Overkill chronology
| Power in Black (1983) | Overkill (1985) |

Power in Black is the first demo from thrash metal band Overkill in 1983, although some songs had been recorded previously, such as "The Beast Within". Three of the songs from this demo ("Overkill", "There's No Tomorrow" and "Raise the Dead") were re-recorded for Overkill's debut Feel the Fire, while "The Beast Within" and "Death Rider" have never been re-recorded on future albums.

== Track listing ==
=== Side one ===
1. "Overkill" – 3:23
2. "The Beast Within" – 4:05
3. "There's No Tomorrow" – 3:35

=== Side two ===
1. "Death Rider" – 3:50
2. "Raise the Dead" – 3:13

== Personnel ==
- Bobby "Blitz" Ellsworth – vocals
- Bobby Gustafson – guitars
- D.D. Verni – bass guitar
- Rat Skates – drums
