= The Grinding Wheel =

2017 studio album by Overkill

Studio album by Overkill
- Released: February 10, 2017
- Recorded: 2016
- Studios: Gear Recording Studio, Shrewsbury, New Jersey
- Genre: Thrash metal
- Length: 60:12
- Label: Nuclear Blast
- Producer: Overkill

Overkill chronology
Historikill: 1995–2007 (2015)	The Grinding Wheel (2017)	The Wings of War (2019)

Singles from The Grinding Wheel
- 1. "Our Finest Hour" Released: November 4, 2016; 2. "Mean, Green, Killing Machine" Released: December 21, 2016

The Grinding Wheel is the eighteenth studio album by thrash metal band Overkill, released on February 10, 2017. It is the last Overkill album with drummer Ron Lipnicki, who left the band shortly after its release and was replaced by Jason Bittner (Shadows Fall and formerly of Flotsam and Jetsam) for the album's tour and its follow-up The Wings of War (2019).

== Production ==
Vocalist Bobby "Blitz" Ellsworth said about the album's style:

"At the end of the day Overkill is Overkill. Our trademark is that we are always recognizable on every release. For the three decades we have been around we were always Overkill. So sure it is a metal record and like always it will have sort of a thrash vibe to it with some melody in it. It's always best to try to make it better or at least think in your mind that it is going to be better. That becomes the challenge. I think that is what keeps the band rolling. A lot of bands are known for what they have done, but I feel being known for where you are and what you are doing is where true value lies. I feel we accomplished that on the last few albums."

The album's title was revealed in an interview with Alternative Nation in August 2016, along with a projected release date of November. It was originally planned to be released in October 2016 before being pushed back a month later; however, the album's release date was pushed back to February 2017 to coincide with the band's US tour with Nile. On November 16, 2016, it was announced that The Grinding Wheel would be released on February 10, 2017, and its artwork and track listing were revealed on the same day.

== Critical reception ==
Professional ratings
Review scores
Source	Rating
AllMusic	4/5 stars
Blabbermouth.net	9.5/10
KNAC	4.6/5
Rock Hard	8.5/10
Terrorizer	8/10

The Grinding Wheel has received generally positive reviews from critics. Blabbermouth.net writer Ray Van Horn Jr. gave the album a rating of nine-and-a-half out of ten, and said, "If you think Overkill expended its tanks producing output with such astonishing velocity, you don't know this band very well. For its eighteenth album, The Grinding Wheel, Overkill does the unthinkable: it outdoes itself. Consider that some fans dropped off after 1991's Horrorscope, which is those poor saps' folly. For the diehard wrecking crew, The Grinding Wheel is going to be a gift to cling to throughout 2017." He finished his review, saying that the album "well surpasses the recent offerings by the Big Four, noble as most of the latter's recent offerings have been. If Destruction won the thrash sweepstakes in 2016, consider Overkill early on front runners for 2017."

AllMusic writer James Christopher Monger gave the album a rating of four stars out of five, and said that it "snaps necks with impunity, but it does so with a structural inventiveness that's eluded some of Overkill's most recent offerings. While the band hasn't lost its knack for dropping unrelenting artillery blasts of breakneck, old-school thrash -- "Goddamn Trouble," "Red, White, and Blue"—there's a nervy, classic rock/NWOBHM undercurrent that runs through Grinding Wheel that owes more to Judas Priest and Accept than it does Testament and Metallica." Monger also praised the album's opening track "Mean, Green, Killing Machine" as "thrilling an opening number as the band has penned in a decade" and "Come Heavy" a "decidedly upbeat, Sabbathy doom anthem".

KNAC.com contributor Alex Yarborough, who reviewed The Grinding Wheel a week before its release, gave the album a rating of four-and-a-half out of five, and wrote, "Fans will also be happy with the thrash energy on this album, while also enjoying the diversity of the songs: more references to NWOBHM, punk, and classic rock. This band is driven by Blitz’s frenetic vocal delivery and energy. Yet no political songs can be found on the album; surprising, since Blitz has some strong political views and 2016 was the most divisive year for politics in American history. Nonetheless, Overkill's middle finger remains in your face."

== Commercial performance ==
The Grinding Wheel debuted at number 69 on the Billboard 200, making it the second highest position of Overkill's career (after its predecessor, White Devil Armory, which charted at number 31).

== Track listing ==
All tracks are written by D. D. Verni and Bobby Ellsworth.

No.	Title	Length
1.	"Mean, Green, Killing Machine"	7:29
2.	"Goddamn Trouble"	6:21
3.	"Our Finest Hour"	5:49
4.	"Shine On"	6:03
5.	"The Long Road"	6:45
6.	"Let's All Go to Hades"	4:55
7.	"Come Heavy"	4:59
8.	"Red, White and Blue"	5:05
9.	"The Wheel"	4:51
10.	"The Grinding Wheel"	7:55
Total length:		60:12

Bonus tracks
No.	Title	Length
11.	"Emerald" (Thin Lizzy cover)	3:52
12.	"Sanctuary" (Iron Maiden cover (Japanese bonus track))	3:16
Total length:		67:20

== Credits ==
Writing, performance and production credits are adapted from the album liner notes.

=== Personnel ===
Overkill

- Bobby "Blitz" Ellsworth – lead vocals
- D. D. Verni – bass, backing vocals
- Dave Linsk – lead guitar
- Derek Tailer – rhythm guitar
- Ron Lipnicki – drums

Session members

- Eddy Garcia – drums

Production

- Overkill – production
- Andy Sneap – mixing, mastering
- D.D. Verni, Dave Linsk – engineering
- Dave Linsk – engineering, recording (at SKH Studios)
- Jon Ciorciari – recording (at JRod Productions)
- Joe DeMaio – recording (at Shorefire Studio)
- Dan Korneff – editing

Artwork and design

- Travis Smith – cover art, layout
- Hakon Grav – photography

=== Studios ===
- Gear Recording Studio, Shrewsbury, New Jersey – recording
- SKH Studios, Stuart, Florida – additional recording
- JRod Productions, Pomona, New York – additional recording
- Shorefire Studio, Long Branch, New Jersey – additional recording

== Charts ==
Chart (2017)	Peak position
Australian Albums (ARIA)	55
Austrian Albums (Ö3 Austria)	33
Belgian Albums (Ultratop Flanders)	59
Belgian Albums (Ultratop Wallonia)	79
Finnish Albums (Suomen virallinen lista)	44
French Albums (SNEP)	185
German Albums (Offizielle Top 100)	10
Hungarian Albums (MAHASZ)	21
Scottish Albums (Official Charts)	92
Swedish Hard Rock Albums (Sverigetopplistan)	17
Swedish Physical Albums (Sverigetopplistan)	20
Swiss Albums (Schweizer Hitparade)	23
US Billboard 200	69
US Top Hard Rock Albums (Billboard)	2
US Independent Albums (Billboard)	4
US Top Rock Albums (Billboard)	11
US Indie Store Album Sales (Billboard)	1
