= Bloodletting (Overkill album) =

2000 studio album by Overkill

Studio album by Overkill
- Released: October 24, 2000
- Recorded: June–July 2000
- Studio: Carriage House Studio, Stamford, Connecticut
- Genre: Thrash metal; groove metal
- Length: 51:32
- Label: Metal-Is
- Producer: Overkill

Overkill chronology
Coverkill (1999)	Bloodletting (2000)	Wrecking Everything (2002)

Bloodletting is the eleventh studio album by thrash metal band Overkill, released on October 24, 2000, by Metal-Is. It is the first after the departure of guitarists Joe Comeau and Sebastian Marino and the addition of Dave Linsk. Bloodletting also marked the first and only time since 1989's The Years of Decay that Overkill had recorded together as a four-piece.

== Reception ==
Professional ratings
Review scores
Source	Rating
AllMusic	3/5 stars

The album sold around 2,450 copies in its first week of release in the U.S.

== Track listing ==
All tracks are written by Bobby "Blitz" Ellsworth and D.D. Verni except where noted.

No.	Title	Length
1.	"Thunderhead"	5:39
2.	"Bleed Me"	4:30
3.	"What I'm Missin'"	4:36
4.	"Death Comes Out to Play"	5:02
5.	"Let It Burn"	5:18
6.	"I, Hurricane"	5:04
7.	"Left Hand Man"	6:10
8.	"Blown Away"	6:43
9.	"My Name Is Pain"	4:17
10.	"Can't Kill a Dead Man"	4:05
11.	"We Gotta Get Out of This Place (The Animals cover)" (Japanese bonus track)	3:00
Total length:		51:32

== Personnel ==
- Bobby "Blitz" Ellsworth – lead vocals
- D.D. Verni – bass, backing vocals
- Dave Linsk – guitars
- Tim Mallare – drums

=== Additional personnel ===
- Produced by Overkill
- Engineered by John Shyloski and John Montegnese
- Assistant engineered by Chris Jones
- Mixed by Colin Richardson at Sonalyst Studios
- Mastered by Roger Lian at Masterdisk, New York City, USA
