= The Electric Age =

2012 studio album by Overkill

Studio album by Overkill
- Released: March 27, 2012
- Recorded: September 2011–January 2012
- Studio: Gear Recording Studio, Shrewsbury, New Jersey
- Genre: Thrash metal
- Length: 50:27
- Label: eOne Music (North America); Nuclear Blast (Europe)
- Producer: Overkill

Overkill chronology
Ironbound (2010)	The Electric Age (2012)	White Devil Armory (2014)

The Electric Age is the sixteenth studio album by thrash metal band Overkill, which was released on March 27, 2012 in the U.S. on eOne Music and in Europe three days later on Nuclear Blast.

== Reception and sales ==
Professional ratings
Review scores
Source	Rating
AllMusic	4/5 stars
Blabbermouth.net	9.5/10
Exclaim!	favorable
Metal Storm	8.9/10
Metal Forces	9/10

The album sold about 6,700 copies in the United States during the first week of release, beating the band's first week sales of their previous record, Ironbound, which totalled 4,100 copies. The Electric Age was also the first Overkill album to crack the top 100; the album peaked at #77 on the Billboard 200, making it their third highest chart position in their career (their subsequent albums, White Devil Armory and The Grinding Wheel, peaked at #31 and #69 respectively). In its second week The Electric Age sold 2,950 copies and dropped to #170 on the Billboard 200, bringing the sales total to a little under 10,000 copies.

== Track listing ==
All tracks are written by D.D. Verni and Bobby Ellsworth.

No.	Title	Length
1.	"Come and Get It"	6:17
2.	"Electric Rattlesnake"	6:19
3.	"Wish You Were Dead"	4:19
4.	"Black Daze"	3:55
5.	"Save Yourself"	3:43
6.	"Drop the Hammer Down"	6:25
7.	"21st Century Man"	4:12
8.	"Old Wounds, New Scars"	4:11
9.	"All Over But the Shouting"	5:30
10.	"Good Night"	5:36
Total length:		50:26

2013 deluxe edition bonus tracks
No.	Title	Length
11.	"Horrorscope" (live)	5:32
12.	"Long Time Dyin'" (live)	4:11
13.	"Necroshine" (live)	7:27
14.	"Walk Through Fire" (live)	4:53
Total length:		1:12:28

All bonus tracks from Australian Ironbound Tour. These tracks were also released as an EP by the label in 2013.

== Credits ==
Writing, performance and production credits are adapted from the album liner notes.

=== Personnel ===
Overkill

- Bobby "Blitz" Ellsworth – lead vocals
- D.D. Verni – bass, backing vocals
- Dave Linsk – lead guitar
- Derek Tailer – rhythm guitar
- Ron Lipnicki – drums

Production

- Overkill – production
- Greg Reely – mixing, mastering
- D.D. Verni, Dave Linsk – engineering
- Jon "Jonnyrod" Ciorciari – recording (at JRod Productions)
- Dave Linsk – recording (at SKH Recording Studios)
- Dan Korneff – editing
- Rob Shallcross – additional editing

Artwork and design

- Travis Smith – cover art, layout
- Mark Weiss – photography

=== Studios ===
- Gear Recording Studio, Shrewsbury, New Jersey – recording
- JRod Productions, Pomona, New York – additional recording
- SKH Recording Studios, Stuart, Florida – additional recording

== Charts ==
Chart (2012)	Peak position
Austrian Albums (Ö3 Austria)	73
Finnish Albums (Suomen virallinen lista)	30
German Albums (Offizielle Top 100)	34
Hungarian Albums (MAHASZ)	35
Japanese Albums (Oricon)	89
South Korean International Albums (Circle)	30
Swedish Albums (Sverigetopplistan)	41
Swiss Albums (Schweizer Hitparade)	62
UK Independent Albums (OCC)	46
UK Rock & Metal Albums (OCC)	23
US Billboard 200	77
US Independent Albums (Billboard)	13
US Top Hard Rock Albums (Billboard)	7
US Top Rock Albums (Billboard)	22
US Top Tastemaker Albums (Billboard)	15
