= D.D. Verni =

American heavy metal musician

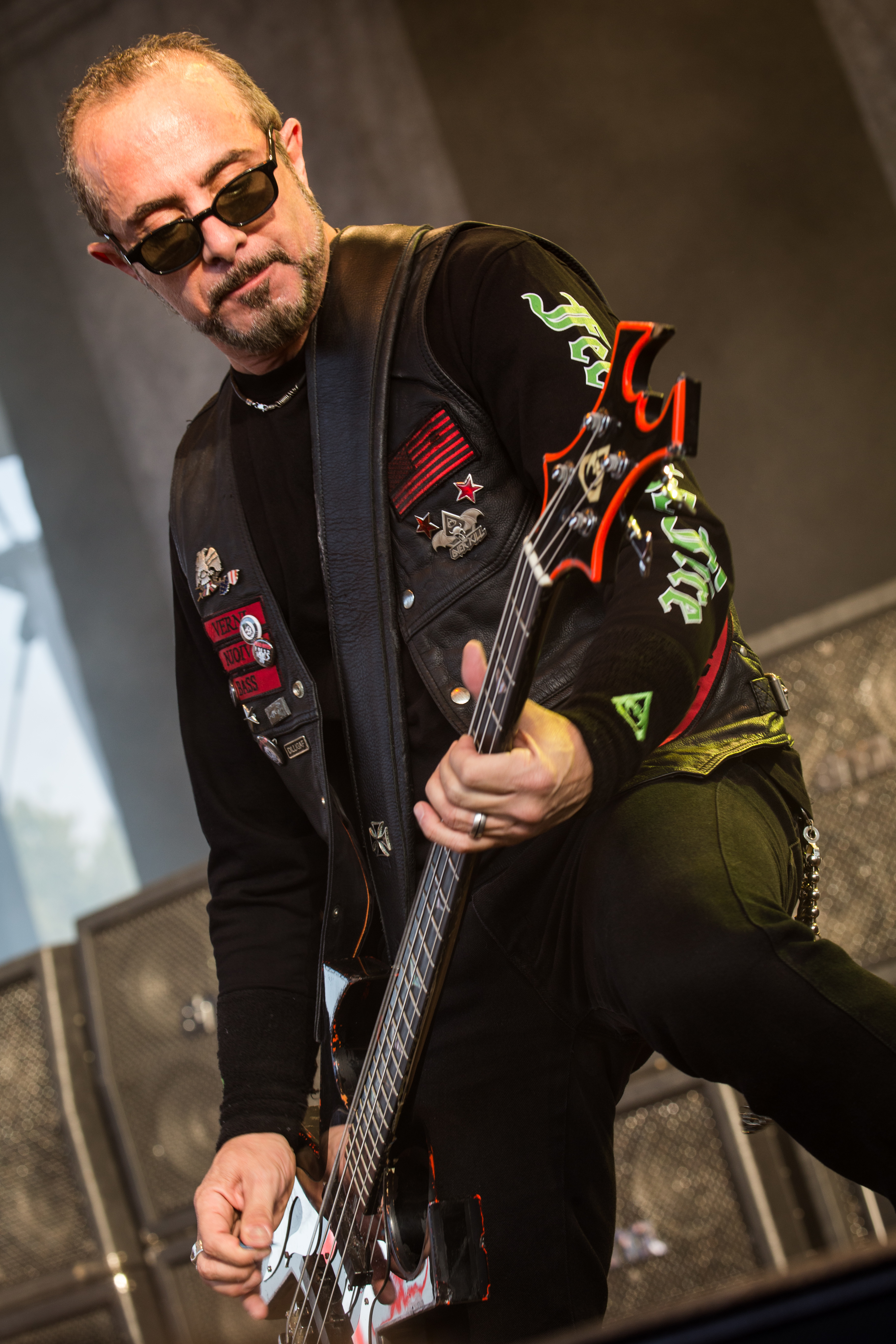
- Verni with Overkill in 2015

Background information
- Also known as: D.D. Blaze
- Born: Carlo Verni; April 12, 1961 (age 64); New Jersey, U.S.
- Genres: Thrash metal, heavy metal
- Occupations: Musician, producer, songwriter
- Instruments: Bass, vocals
- Years active: 1979–present
- Member of: Overkill, The Bronx Casket Co.

Carlo "D.D." Verni (born April 12, 1961) is an American musician, best known as a founding member, bassist and songwriter of the thrash metal band Overkill. He and vocalist Bobby "Blitz" Ellsworth are the only two original members who have remained with the band throughout its entire history. In addition to his work with Overkill, Verni has recorded four albums with his side project the Bronx Casket Co. and released several solo projects. He is also the composer of The Bronx Casket Co.... A New Musical.

== Career ==
=== Pre-Overkill bands ===
In 1976, Verni met Rat Skates, who had been learning to play drums since age 15, at New Providence High School. They shared the same musical interests in hard rock bands like Kiss, Aerosmith, Ted Nugent, Starz, Black Sabbath, and Rainbow, and were then introduced to punk music such as The Damned, The Ramones, The Vibrators, and Generation X. The three formed a punk group known as The Lubricunts in 1979. The group disbanded in 1980, and Verni, along with bandmate Skates, posted an advertisement for a vocalist and guitarist to join the band. Bobby "Blitz" Ellsworth answered the ad, and brought guitarist Rob Pisarek.

=== Overkill ===
After rejecting several names, the band finally settled on "Overkill". Their early covers included punk songs by The Ramones and The Dead Boys. By late 1980, the band had recruited dual guitarists, and the setlist was made up of songs by bands such as Motörhead ("Overkill", half of the Ace of Spades album), Judas Priest ("Tyrant" was their closer), and Riot. Along with the new influx of heavy metal covers, the band still played a smattering of punk covers, with extra distortion, intensity, and speed marking Overkill as one of the first thrash bands.

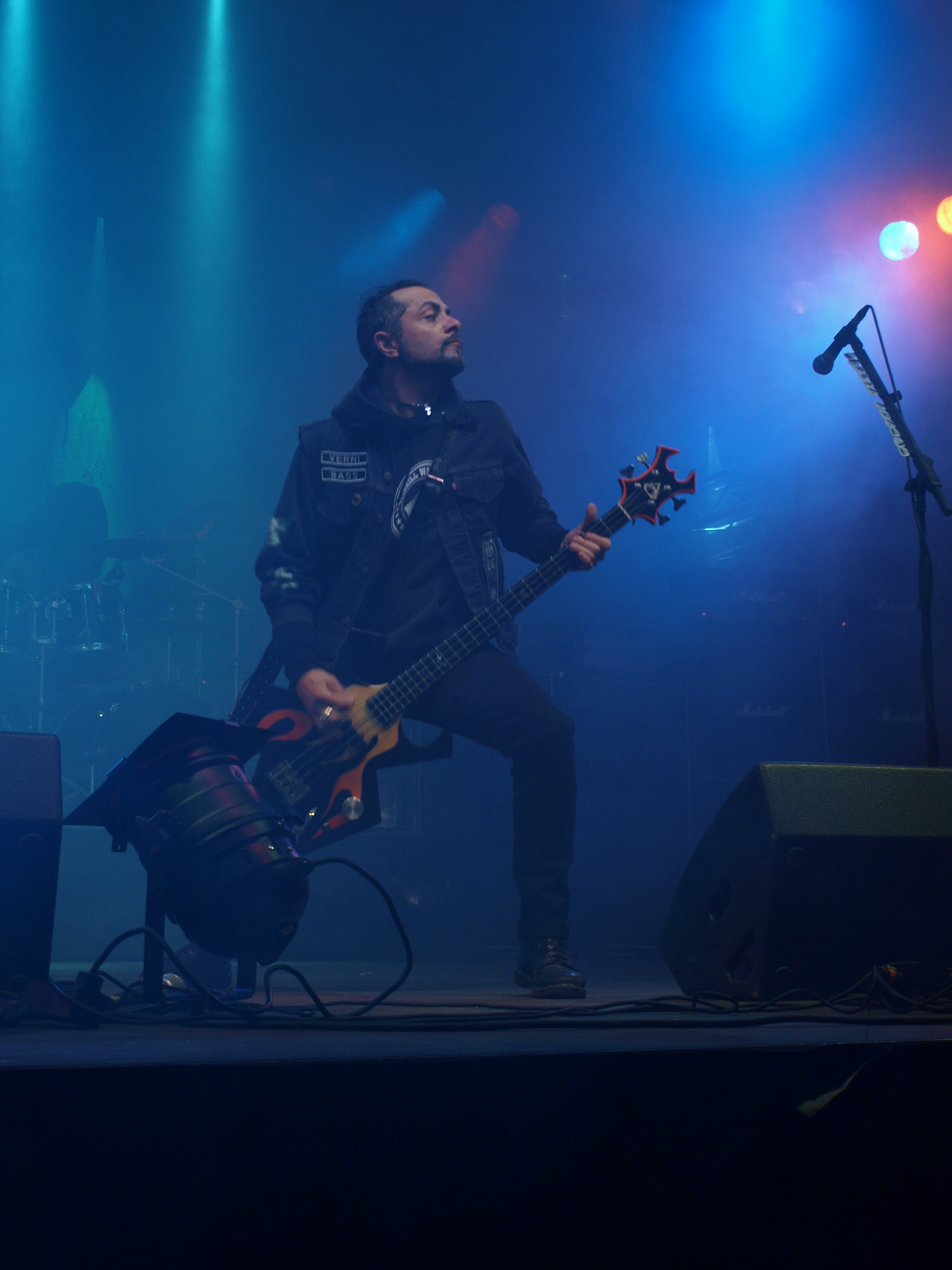
Verni with Overkill at Jalometalli Metal Music Festival 2008

At this point, the band started writing original songs, including "Grave Robbers" (later renamed "Raise The Dead"), "Overkill", and "Unleash the Beast (Within)". More songs followed, including "Death Rider" (1981) and "Rotten to the Core" (1982). Overkill had experienced a number of member changes by the time of their first demo Power in Black (1983), which featured the "classic" lineup of Verni, vocalist Bobby "Blitz" Ellsworth, drummer Rat Skates and guitarist Bobby Gustafson. The band became a staple at New York and New Jersey clubs, such as L'Amours, and Verni gave Ellsworth the nickname "Blitz" due to his over-the-top lifestyle. There have been numerous more lineup changes since the departures of Skates and Gustafson (in 1987 and 1990 respectively), and Verni and Ellsworth are the only remaining original members left in Overkill. Verni has also been the sole songwriter for the band's music since Horrorscope (1991).

Overkill released their first album Feel the Fire in 1985, and along with their contemporaries (including Metallica, Exodus, Slayer, Megadeth and Anthrax), they helped define a new genre of music, known as "thrash metal". Overkill have released 20 full-length albums as well as two live albums and EPs, and several DVDs. They have done thousands of shows for millions of fans and toured extensively. They have appeared in many major music publications and have sold millions of records worldwide. Verni's signature bass sound is regarded as one of the most definable in heavy metal. He usually plays bass with a pick as opposed to with his fingers.

=== Work outside of Overkill ===
Verni released his first solo album, Barricade, on October 12, 2018. He also released a debut album under the name D.D. Verni & The Cadillac Band, Let's Rattle, on September 17, 2021.

Verni released his second solo album, Dreadful Company, on July 26, 2024. It sees Verni move into a punk rock direction.

== Discography ==
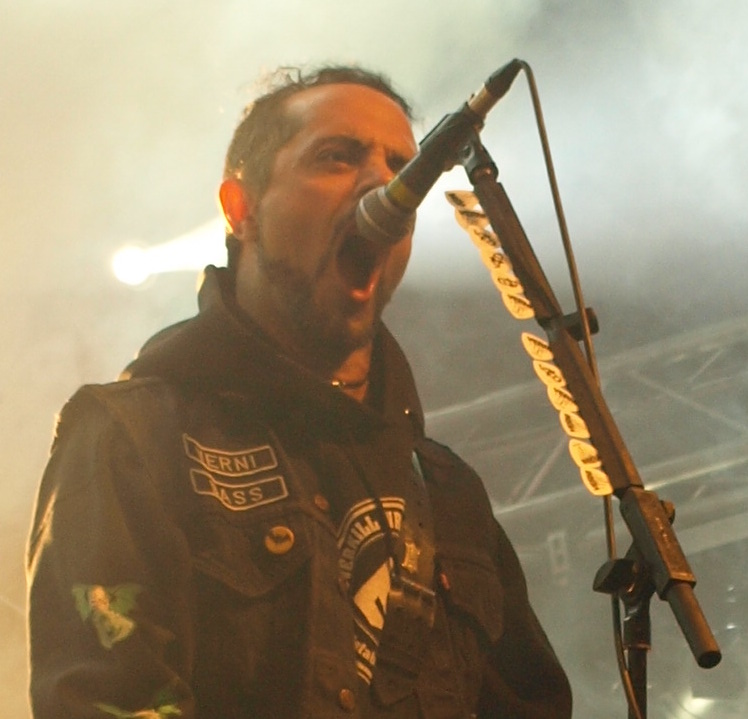
Verni in 2008

=== Solo ===
- 2018: Barricade
- 2024: Dreadful Company

=== Overkill ===
| Title | Type | Label | Year |
|---|---|---|---|
| Power in Black | Demo | Blood Metal Music | 1983 |
| Overkill | EP | Azra / Metal Storm | 1985 |
| Feel the Fire | Studio album | Megaforce | 1985 |
| Taking Over | Studio album | Megaforce / Atlantic | 1987 |
| !!!Fuck You!!! | EP | Megaforce / Caroline | 1987 |
| Under the Influence | Studio album | Megaforce | 1988 |
| The Years of Decay | Studio album | Megaforce / Atlantic | 1989 |
| Horrorscope | Studio Album | Megaforce / Atlantic | 1991 |
| I Hear Black | Studio album | Atlantic | 1993 |
| W.F.O. | Studio album | Atlantic | 1994 |
| Wrecking Your Neck | Live album | CMC International | 1995 |
| The Killing Kind | Studio album | CMC International | 1996 |
| !!!Fuck You!!! and Then Some | EP | Megaforce | 1996 |
| From the Underground and Below | Studio album | CMC International | 1997 |
| Necroshine | Studio album | CMC International | 1999 |
| Coverkill | Covers album | CMC International | 1999 |
| Bloodletting | Studio album | Metal-Is | 2000 |
| Wrecking Everything | Live album | Spitfire Records | 2002 |
| Killbox 13 | Studio album | Spitfire Records | 2003 |
| ReliXIV | Studio album | Spitfire Records | 2005 |
| Immortalis | Studio album | Bodog Music | 2007 |
| Ironbound | Studio album | Nuclear Blast | 2010 |
| The Electric Age | Studio album | Nuclear Blast | 2012 |
| White Devil Armory | Studio album | Nuclear Blast | 2014 |
| Historikill: 1995–2007 | Box set | Nuclear Blast | 2015 |
| Grinding Wheel | Studio album | Nuclear Blast | 2017 |
| The Wings of War | Studio album | Nuclear Blast | 2019 |
| Scorched | Studio album | Nuclear Blast | 2023 |
