= Overkill (band) =

American thrash metal band

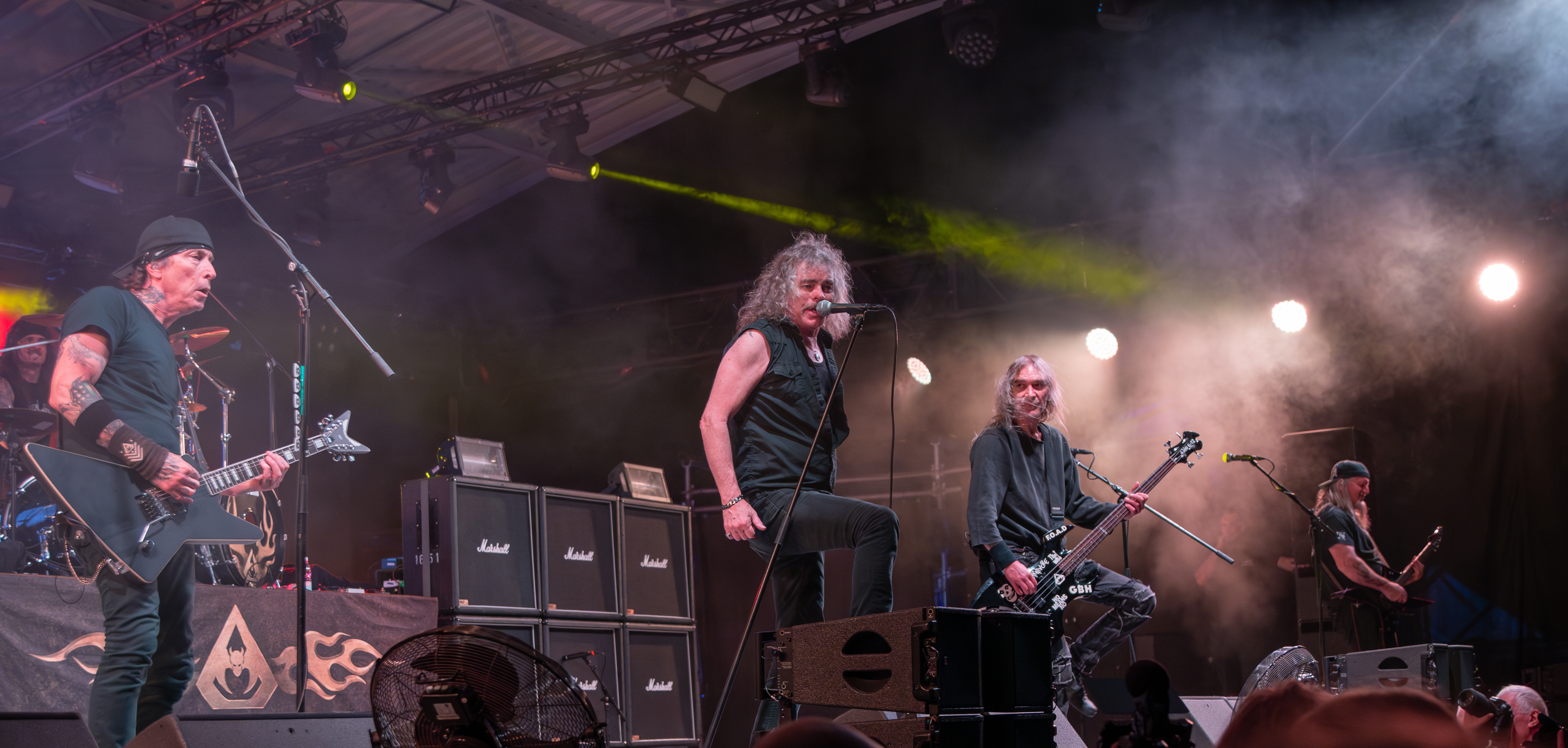
- Overkill performing in 2024

Background information
- Origin: Old Bridge Township, New Jersey, U.S.
- Genre: Thrash metal
- Works: Discography
- Years active: 1980–present
- Labels: Megaforce; Atlantic; CMC; SPV/Steamhammer; Metal-Is; Spitfire; Regain; Bodog; Entertainment One Music; Nuclear Blast; Azra/Metal Storm
- Members: D.D. Verni; Bobby "Blitz" Ellsworth; Dave Linsk; Derek Tailer; Jeramie Kling
- Past members: See List of former Overkill members
- Website: wreckingcrew.com
- Logo

Overkill is an American thrash metal band, formed in 1980 in New Jersey. They have gone through many lineup changes, leaving bassist D.D. Verni and lead vocalist Bobby "Blitz" Ellsworth as the only remaining original members. The band's current lineup includes Verni, Ellsworth, Dave Linsk on lead guitar, Derek "The Skull" Tailer on rhythm guitar, and Jeramie Kling on drums. Notable former members include guitarists Dan Spitz, Bobby Gustafson, Merritt Gant and Joe Comeau, and drummers Rat Skates and Jason Bittner.

Along with Nuclear Assault and Anthrax, the latter of which featured Spitz as a guitarist, Overkill is one of the most successful East Coast thrash metal bands, and have been called "the Motörhead of thrash metal", due to their unique playing style, which is influenced by punk and the new wave of British heavy metal (NWOBHM). The band has a mascot named Chaly (a skeletal bat with a skull-like face, horns, bony wings and green eyes) that has appeared on many of their album covers.

Overkill has released twenty studio albums, an album of cover songs, two extended plays (EPs), one demo tape, and three live albums. They were one of the first thrash metal bands to be signed to a major label (having signed to Atlantic Records in 1986), and rose to popularity as part of the genre's movement of the mid-to-late 1980s, along with the "Big Four" (Metallica, Megadeth, Slayer and Anthrax) and other bands such as Exodus and Testament. Overkill achieved its first mainstream success with their second studio album and Atlantic debut, Taking Over (1987), which peaked at number 191 on the Billboard 200. The band's next five studio albums – Under the Influence (1988), The Years of Decay (1989), Horrorscope (1991), I Hear Black (1993) and W.F.O. (1994) – were also successful on the Billboard charts, with the latter two entering the top 10 on the Top Heatseekers chart. Following their split with Atlantic in 1995, Overkill went through label changes but continued to enjoy moderate underground success, particularly in Europe and Japan. The band experienced a resurgence in the U.S. during the 2010s, with three of their studio albums released that decade – The Electric Age (2012), White Devil Armory (2014) and The Grinding Wheel (2017) – reaching the top 100 on the charts. Overkill has sold over 16 million records worldwide. They are estimated to have sold more than 625,000 records in the U.S. since the beginning of the SoundScan era.

== History ==
=== Early years and Feel the Fire (1980–1986) ===
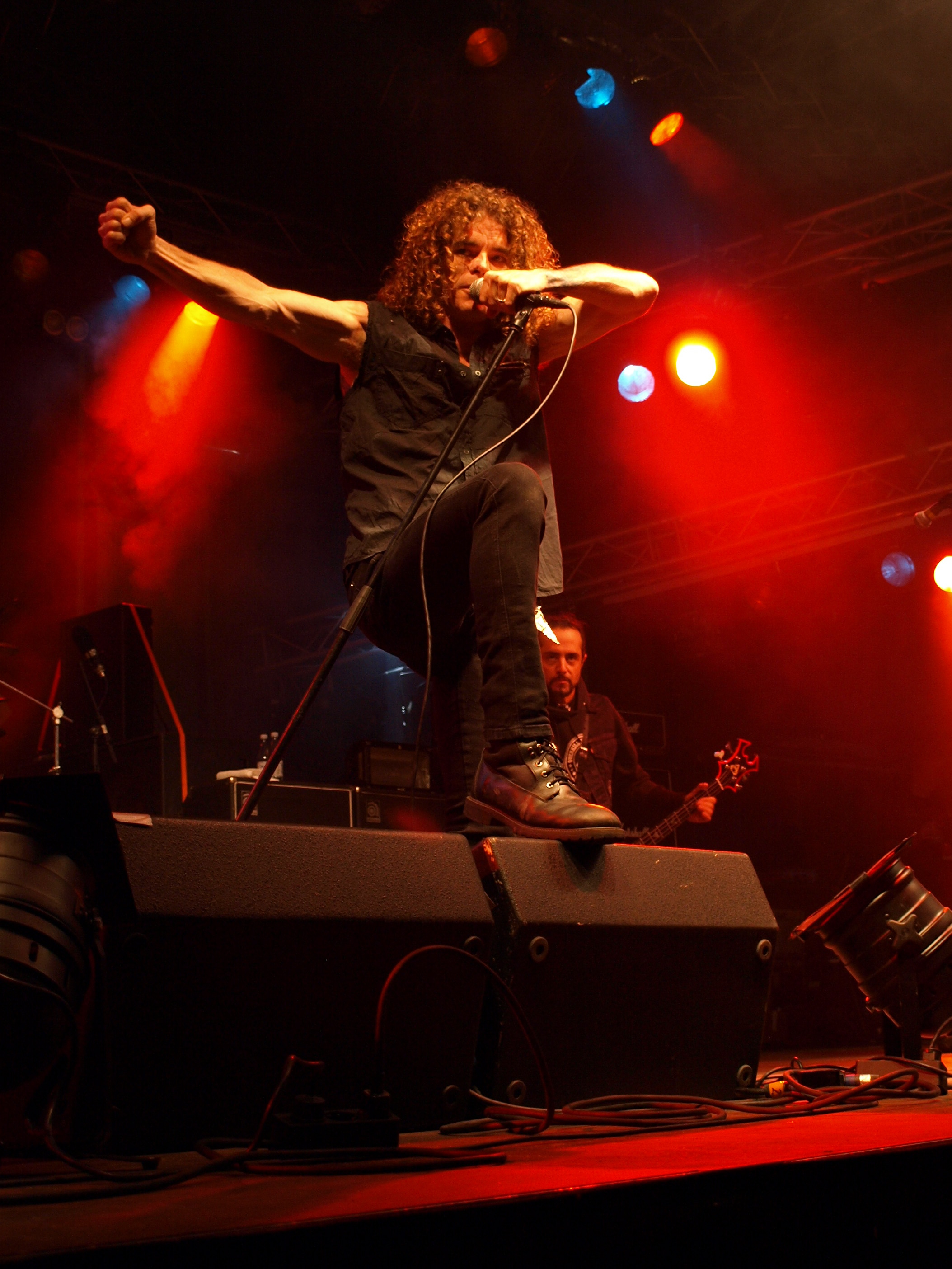
Bassist D.D. Verni (right) gave frontman Bobby Ellsworth the nickname "Blitz" due to his over the top lifestyle.

Overkill was formed in 1980 by members of the punk band the Lubricunts, which featured bassist D.D. Verni and drummer Rat Skates. Verni and Skates placed an ad looking for a guitarist and lead singer, which was answered by guitarist Robert Pisarek and singer Bobby Ellsworth, and the first incarnation of Overkill was formed. After rejecting several names (including Virgin Killer), the band settled on Overkill, naming it after Motörhead's second album.

Early on, they covered punk songs by the Ramones, the Dead Boys and others. By late 1980, the band's setlist included songs by bands such as Motörhead (including songs from Overkill and half of the Ace of Spades album), Judas Priest ("Tyrant" in particular), and Riot. Along with the influx of heavy metal covers, the band still played a smattering of punk covers, with extra distortion, intensity, and speed. In 1981, the band went through a succession of guitarists after Pisarek left, first being replaced by Dan Spitz (who later joined Anthrax) and Anthony Ammendola, then Rich Conte and Mike Sherry, before settling with Bobby Gustafson in late 1982. Around this time, the band started writing original songs, including "Grave Robbers" (later renamed "Raise the Dead"), "Overkill", and "Unleash the Beast (Within)". More songs followed, including "Death Rider" (1981) and "Rotten to the Core" (1982). As the band continued to write original material, they became a staple at clubs in New York and New Jersey, including L'Amour.

In 1983, the lineup of Verni, Skates, Ellsworth, and Gustafson released the Power in Black demo, a recording that made as much impact in the underground tape trading circuit as demos by then-up-and-coming Bay Area thrash metal bands, such as Exodus and Testament (then-called Legacy). Power in Black gained the band two compilation appearances: "Feel the Fire" was included on New York Metal '84 while "Death Rider" appeared on the fifth volume of Metal Blade Records' Metal Massacre series. The success of Power in Black also enabled the band to secure a small recording deal with Azra/Metal Storm Records, resulting in the 1985 four-track extended play (EP) Overkill, which quickly sold out, pushing the band to the forefront of the fledgling thrash metal movement. Long out of print, the vinyl-only EP is now considered a rare collector's item, and all the songs appeared eleven years later on the compilation album !!!Fuck You!!! and Then Some.

Though it is said that the band never received money from its release, the Overkill EP garnered the band massive underground interest and the attention of Jon Zazula, owner of Megaforce Records, a prominent independent heavy metal record label at the time. Megaforce signed Overkill to a multi-album record contract and released their full-length debut album, Feel the Fire, in October 1985. Hailed by many critics and fans as a thrash metal masterpiece, the album cemented the band's position as a driving force of the East Coast thrash metal movement. The band spent the better part of 1985 and 1986 touring in support of Feel the Fire, touring Europe with Anthrax and Agent Steel, and opening for Slayer on their Reign in Blood tour in North America. Overkill's tour schedule and the growing buzz for Feel the Fire resulted in several major labels courting the band. They eventually signed to Atlantic Records, making Overkill one of the early thrash metal bands to sign with a major label.

=== Rise to success (1987–1990) ===
Overkill's second album, Taking Over, was released in March 1987; it was the first to be released by Megaforce with distribution from Atlantic Records. The album featured longer songs and improved production. Taking Over brought the band public recognition, becoming their first album to enter the Billboard 200 chart, while Overkill's first-ever music video, "In Union We Stand", received significant airplay on MTV's Headbangers Ball. Another European tour followed, this time opening for Helloween. Overkill also opened for Megadeth on their Peace Sells tour in North America, and headlined their own U.S. tour, with support from Nuclear Assault and then-labelmates Testament.

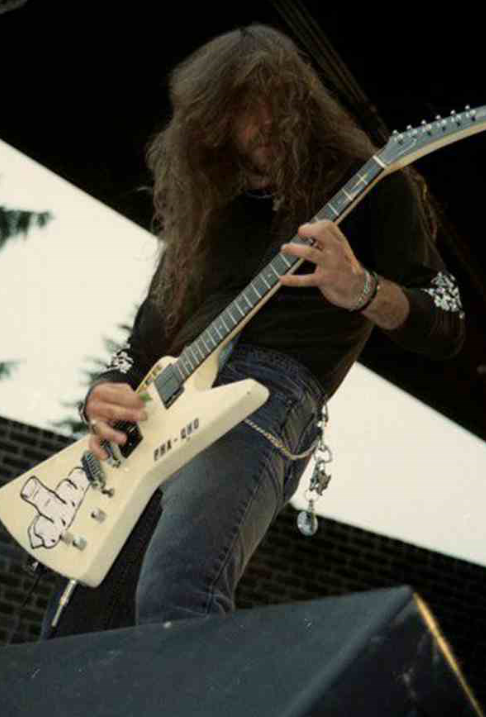
Guitarist Bobby Gustafson was a member of Overkill from 1982 to 1990.

In late 1987, the !!!Fuck You!!! EP was released, consisting of a studio cover version of the Subhumans' "Fuck You" and a handful of live tracks recorded earlier that year at the Phantasy Theater in Cleveland. 1987 also saw the departure of founding drummer Rat Skates. He was replaced temporarily by Mark Archibole, and then permanently by Danish drummer Bob "Sid" Falck, formerly of Paul Di'Anno's Battlezone. Overkill closed out the year with a one-off show at the Christmas on Earth festival in Leeds, together with Megadeth, Kreator, Nuclear Assault, Voivod, the Cro-Mags, Lȧȧz Rockit and Virus.

Overkill released their third album, Under the Influence, in July 1988. Once again produced by Alex Perialas, who worked on the band's first two albums, Under the Influence was rawer and thrashier, lacking most of the epic atmosphere heard on Taking Over. "Hello from the Gutter" was released as a single, and its music video gained regular airplay on Headbangers Ball. Overkill kept touring all over the world, furthering their reputation as one of the most active live metal bands. This included opening for Slayer on their South of Heaven tour in the United States and Europe, and performing with Anthrax, Motörhead, Anvil, Nuclear Assault, M.O.D., Testament, Vio-lence, King's X, Prong, Murphy's Law, Ludichrist and Znowhite.

Overkill released their fourth album, The Years of Decay, in October 1989. Produced by Terry Date (who later worked with the likes of Pantera, White Zombie, Soundgarden and Deftones), the album featured the band's best production value to date, as well as Overkill's most progressive and diverse work compared to previous albums. It combined the raw approach of Under the Influence with more complex song structures and epic elements of Taking Over, resulting in a more serious atmosphere and longer songs, including the eight-minute title track and the ten-minute "Playing With Spiders/Skullkrusher", the latter being the longest track Overkill has recorded to date. Although the album charted lower than Under the Influence on the Billboard 200 at number 155, The Years of Decay was a breakthrough album for Overkill, selling over 67,000 copies within the next decade-and-a-half, and includes one of the band's best-known songs, "Elimination", for which a music video received regular airplay on Headbangers Ball. That song became a fan favorite and remains a staple in the band's live repertoire. Overkill toured extensively in support of The Years of Decay between November 1989 and June 1990, with bands such as Testament, Wolfsbane, Dark Angel, Vio-lence, Mordred, Powermad, Whiplash and Excel.

=== Horrorscope, I Hear Black and W.F.O. (1990–1995) ===
After The Years of Decay tour ended in the summer of 1990, Gustafson left Overkill. Accounts vary as to how and why he split with the band: he had been either fired by Verni and Ellsworth, or had left Overkill following an argument over the band's musical direction. Gustafson said that one of the reasons he left Overkill was due to disagreements over royalties, during which he became embroiled in a feud with Verni and Ellsworth. The remaining members added two new guitarists to the band: Rob Cannavino, who had been Gustafson's guitar technician, and Merritt Gant, formerly of Faith or Fear. Ellsworth stated in an interview with Invisible Oranges years later that the reason Overkill hired two guitarists was mainly because they wanted to do something different: "We knew if we replaced Bobby with one guitarist, we'd get compared to what we were. So, it seemed like to logical thing to bring in two players. We didn't want anyone to say, 'Bobby was better than this new guy.' And we wanted to perform old stuff with two guitars to keep in fresh. We realized that change isn't a bad thing."

The "new" Overkill recorded their fifth album, Horrorscope, once again produced by Terry Date, in 1991. Featuring the furious riffs and trade-off solos of new guitarists Cannavino and Gant, and the refined songwriting of Verni and Ellsworth, Horrorscope silenced worries from fans that the band would not recover from their split with Gustafson. The album is regarded as one of Overkill's defining moments and is arguably their heaviest release. Focusing on a darker, heavier style, the album spawned the doomy single "Horrorscope", a departure from the band's earlier singles, which were traditionally uptempo songs. Horrorscope was Overkill's first album to be accompanied by more than one music video or single; there were music videos for the title track and "Thanx for Nothin'" (both of which received airplay on Headbangers Ball), while songs like "Coma", "Infectious" and the cover version of Edgar Winter's "Frankenstein" received particular attention (through radio airplay or otherwise), expanding the band's popularity in the heavy metal community, and helping the album enter the Top 30 on the Billboard Heatseekers chart. Overkill supported Horrorscope by touring North America with Anacrusis and Galactic Cowboys in 1991 and Armored Saint in 1992, after which drummer Sid Falck left the band. Admittedly never a big fan of thrash metal, Falck said he initially wanted to push his drumming to the limit by playing the most complex type of music, and in time he decided to pursue other musical interests. In an interview with Antichrist magazine, however, he said it was misquotation, and that he still listens to thrash metal exclusively.

Falck was replaced by former M.O.D. drummer Tim Mallare, with whom the next Overkill album I Hear Black was recorded. Released in March 1993, I Hear Black reunited the band with producer Alex Perialas, and was the first Overkill album released directly through Atlantic Records. The album again presented a change in style, from the heavy thrash of Horrorscope to a more stoner/blues rock-oriented style influenced by Black Sabbath. The eclectic nature of the album is often attributed to the number of songwriters involved. Verni and Ellsworth handled most of the songwriting on subsequent albums, with only minor contributions from other members. A music video was shot for "Spiritual Void" and it received minor airplay on Headbangers Ball. The European leg of the 1993 "World of Hurt Tour" featured Savatage and Non-Fiction as support acts.

Overkill's self-produced seventh album, W.F.O. (which stands for "Wide Fuckin' Open", a common biker term), was released on July 15, 1994, in response to the criticism that I Hear Black had received. The album was fast, old school thrash metal without the experimental elements of I Hear Black in favor of a groove-oriented sound. The music video for "Fast Junkie" received little or no airplay from MTV, due to changing mainstream tastes and limited airplay availability for metal bands. Overkill continued to have bigger success overseas, mounting an extensive European tour in the fall, supported by Jag Panzer and Massacra.

With grunge dominating the airwaves in the United States, many heavy metal radio stations changing formats and Headbangers Ball going off the air on MTV, W.F.O. failed to find an audience, and in 1995 Overkill split with Atlantic Records. The band was happy to leave the major label, where they felt they received little or no attention and signed to different record companies around the world (CMC International in the US).

A March 1995 show, once again in Cleveland, Ohio, was recorded for Overkill's first full-length live album, a near 100-minute double CD entitled Wrecking Your Neck. The album was released in May 1995, with the first pressing featuring a bonus CD containing the Overkill EP that had been out of print for years. A music video for the song "Bastard Nation" taken from Wrecking Your Neck was released, but failed to receive airplay in the US.

=== Post-Atlantic years (1995–2002) ===
Late in 1995, Cannavino and Gant left the band, Cannavino to focus on motorcycle racing and Gant to spend more time with his family. Overkill hired Joe Comeau, former singer of Liege Lord, on guitar. Comeau brought along former Anvil guitarist Sebastian Marino, with whom he had worked in the past. The new lineup recorded The Killing Kind in 1996, again self-produced and mixed by Chris Tsangarides (Judas Priest). While staying within the thrash genre, the album was a departure from its predecessor's more traditional thrash metal style and featured different elements such as hardcore, while the vocals showed influences from a broad spectrum of music. As Comeau was also a singer, backing vocals on The Killing Kind and subsequent albums were more elaborate and frequent than before, adding another element to the band's sound. Press response to The Killing Kind was positive, but the album remains a hotly contested topic among the band's audience, with some longtime fans resistant to the new modern elements, and others hailing The Killing Kind as one of the band's finest moments.

Overkill toured Europe twice in support of The Killing Kind first in February 1996 with Megora and Accu§er, and again in November with Anvil and Stahlhammer. In the summer of 1996, Overkill appeared on Volume 2 of Century Media's Legends of Metal – A Tribute to Judas Priest compilation, to which they contributed "Tyrant".

In October 1996, the band released !!!Fuck You!!! and Then Some. The album included the !!!Fuck You!!! EP, which had been out of print for some years, along with the Overkill EP and two live tracks from a 1990 promo single. The following year saw the release of the ninth Overkill studio album, titled From the Underground and Below. It retained some of the modern influences from The Killing Kind, while also reincorporating elements from the band's earlier efforts. Some songs on From the Underground and Below, including "Save Me", even had a slight industrial metal sound. Reportedly, a video for the track "Long Time Dyin'" was shot, but received no television exposure. In 1998, the band once again opted to tour only Europe in support of the album, touring alongside Nevermore, Angel Dust and Nocturnal Rites.

In 1998, Ellsworth was diagnosed with an aggressive form of nose cancer and underwent immediate surgery, stopping the cancer before it spread. After his recovery, the band started work on their tenth studio album. The self-produced Necroshine was released in February 1999, making Overkill the first thrash metal band to release ten full-length studio albums. While once again different from the previous records and musically not considered "classic" Overkill, the album was vocally even more experimental than The Killing Kind, and was well received by fans and critics.

Before the release of Necroshine, Sebastian Marino left Overkill to spend more time with his family. He was replaced by Dave Linsk from New Jersey hardcore/thrash metal band Anger on Anger. A two-week European trip in June was arranged to fill the gap between appearances at the Dynamo and With Full Force festivals.

October 1999 saw the release of Coverkill, an album of cover versions from bands that were especially influential to Overkill, such as Black Sabbath, Kiss, Motörhead, Manowar, and the Ramones. Some tracks had previously been available on compilations or as bonus tracks, but others had been shelved for years (the earliest recording was from the Under the Influence sessions) or were recorded immediately before the album's release. A full European tour in support of both Necroshine and Coverkill took place in February 2000, as Overkill co-headlined with Annihilator, with Dew-Scented in the opening slot.

During the European tour, Annihilator fired their lead singer Randy Rampage due to disruptive behavior. A few months later, Joe Comeau was confirmed as his replacement. The band returned to the studio as a four-piece, and in the fall of 2000, released Bloodletting. It was again produced by the band and mixed by Colin Richardson.

In November 2000, the band toured Europe as a special guest on Halford's Resurrection world tour. Since Overkill had not yet found a new second guitarist, Comeau joined on a temporary basis for the tour. For the last couple of shows, the band also utilized another session musician. With D.D. Verni's wife giving birth to their second child, Verni missed a week or two of shows, and Derek Tailer of Dee Snider's band SMFs filled in. In 2002, Tailer was announced as a permanent member of Overkill, although not on bass, but filling the vacant second guitarist position.

=== Switching labels and drummers (2002–2008) ===
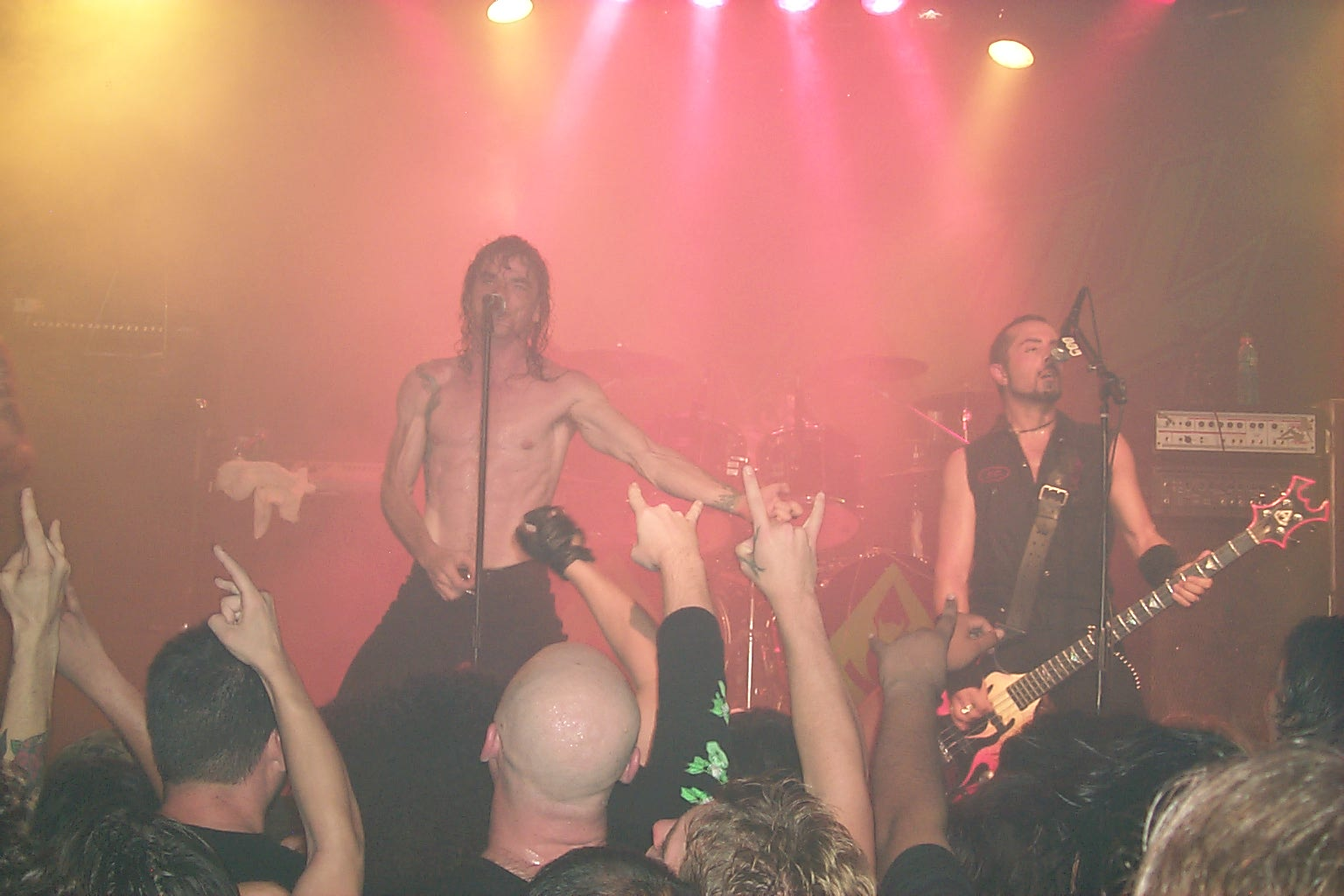
Overkill live at the Whisky a Go Go in 2005

After a break, Overkill resurfaced in 2002 with Wrecking Everything, their second full-length live album, recorded at the Paramount Theatre in Asbury Park, New Jersey. The album contained only songs that had not been on Wrecking Your Neck, some because they were released on later albums, but also a few early songs from albums such as Taking Over, Under the Influence and The Years of Decay. The same show was used for Overkill's first ever DVD, Wrecking Everything – An Evening in Asbury Park, also released in 2002.

The European tour in June 2002, supporting Bloodletting and Wrecking Everything, saw Blaze and Wicked Mystic opening for Overkill. During the second to last show of the tour in Nuremberg, Germany, Blitz suffered a stroke on stage. For nearly three days, there were rumors that Blitz was in a coma, permanently paralyzed, or dead. Three days later, the band announced that the stroke was minor and had no lasting consequences.

Overkill signed to Spitfire Records and entered the studio in late 2002 to record their twelfth studio album, Killbox 13. Produced by the band and Colin Richardson, and released in March 2003, the album was their twelfth regular studio album, but the Overkill EP was counted to make it 13. The album received critical acclaim, combining the "new" Overkill with their raw early style heard on their debut Feel the Fire. Touring for the album included a number of European festivals during the summer, and a full European tour followed in November with Seven Witches and After All. The band played without Derek Tailer, who was absent for undisclosed reasons. Nobody was hired to fill in for him, so Overkill toured as a four-piece for the first time since 1990. Tailer was still considered a full member of the band.

In late 2004, after a Japanese tour with Death Angel and Flotsam and Jetsam, the band started work on another album in D.D. Verni's own recording studio. The album, ReliXIV, was produced and mixed by the band themselves and released in March 2005.

Overkill toured the eastern US in April 2005, and before they went on a European tour in May, it was announced that Mallare would not take part in this tour, with former Hades drummer Ron Lipnicki replacing him. A few weeks later, the band announced that Mallare had permanently left and Lipnicki was his replacement. In the summer of 2005, Overkill organized their first US West Coast tour in more than ten years, playing Western Canada to Southern California. The tour was such a success that the band was added to the 2006 Gigantour as second-stage headliners, marking Overkill's first nationwide US tour since 1994.

Overkill played at Wacken Open Air in August 2007. Now with the Bodog Music label, the band rejoined forces with Jonny and Marsha Zazula, previous owners of Megaforce Records, who were part of the Bodog Team in the United States. Overkill released its 14th studio album, Immortalis, on October 9, 2007. The album featured founders Bobby Ellsworth and D.D. Verni, guitarists Dave Linsk and Derek Tailer, and new drummer Ron Lipnicki. Lamb of God vocalist Randy Blythe contributed vocals on the song "Skull and Bones".

=== Return to popularity (2009–2017) ===
On October 30, 2009, it was announced that Overkill had inked a multi-album deal with Nuclear Blast. The band's 15th album, Ironbound, described as a "thrashter-piece", was released on February 9, 2010. The album marked a "comeback" for Overkill after years of lackluster record sales and declining popularity in the U.S. since the mid-1990s. It was the band's first album to appear on the Billboard 200 chart since 1993's I Hear Black, peaking at number 192. The band was playing at Times Square in New York City on May 1, 2010, as part of their Ironbound tour when someone unsuccessfully attempted to blow up a nearby car with fireworks. The show proceeded without interruption, but some ticket holders arriving late were prevented from entering the theater by police responding to the incident. Overkill had toured for almost two years promoting Ironbound; it started with a European trek in February 2010 (supported by Suicidal Angels, Savage Messiah and Cripper), followed two months later by a U.S. tour with Vader, God Dethroned, Warbringer, Evile and Woe of Tyrants. The band performed at the Wacken Open Air music festival in 2010. The band toured the U.S. again in the fall (this time with Forbidden, Evile, Gama Bomb and Bonded by Blood), and then did a European run in March 2011 with Destruction, Heathen, After All and Bonded by Blood. The tour cycle for Ironbound ended in South America in the fall of 2011.

In July 2011, Overkill began demoing six songs and announced that they were planning to begin recording their 16th album in October for an early 2012 release. The resulting album, The Electric Age, was released on March 27, 2012, and it was the band's first album to enter the top 100 on the Billboard 200, peaking at number 77, Overkill's highest chart position at the time. In 2013, the band embarked on The Dark Roots of Thrash tour of North America, headlined by Testament, and supported by Flotsam and Jetsam and 4Arm. They canceled their February 15 show in Huntington at The Paramount Theatre due to singer Bobby Ellsworth being diagnosed with "walking pneumonia". On February 18, it was announced that Overkill dropped out of the Dark Roots of Thrash tour as Blitz's condition had gotten slightly worse after the show in Worcester, Massachusetts.

On August 31, 2013, Overkill entered Gear Recording to begin recording their seventeenth studio album. The album was going to be released on March 7, 2014. On January 14, however, it was announced that the album was postponed to July. On March 15, it was revealed that the new album would be titled White Devil Armory. After some delays, White Devil Armory was released on July 22, 2014. The album was their most successful, peaking at No. 31 on the Billboard 200, Overkill's highest chart position yet.

Overkill played a special show on April 16, 2016, in Oberhausen, where they played the Feel the Fire and Horrorscope albums in their entirety. The show was professionally filmed and recorded for the DVD Live in Overhausen, released on May 18, 2018.

Overkill released a box set, Historikill: 1995–2007, on October 16, 2015. To support the box set, Overkill embarked on a North American tour with Symphony X in September–October 2015, and a UK tour in April 2016. In a September 2015 interview, Ellsworth revealed that Overkill had begun writing their eighteenth studio album, and by March 2016, they had "fully demoed" eleven songs for it. Ellsworth said in a March 2016 interview that Overkill would begin recording the album in early May for an October release. The band toured North America in early 2017. On April 16, 2017, the band announced that drummer Ron Lipnicki would miss the European tour due to a family emergency, and he would be replaced by Eddy Garcia, which was later confirmed to be a "personal issue" from Lipnicki. On August 13, 2016, The Grinding Wheel was announced as the name of the album, and Ellsworth said the band was "looking for a first-week-of-November release"; however, the album's release date was pushed back to February 10, 2017. The Grinding Wheel was another successful album for Overkill. It reached number 69 on the Billboard 200, the band's second-highest chart position behind White Devil Armory. To support the album, Overkill toured North America with Nile, and supported former Sepultura members Max and Igor Cavalera in Europe on their Return to Roots tour. They also headlined the 2017 edition of the Metal Alliance Tour, supported by Crowbar, Havok, Black Fast and Invidia.

=== Jason Bittner-era (2017–2024) ===
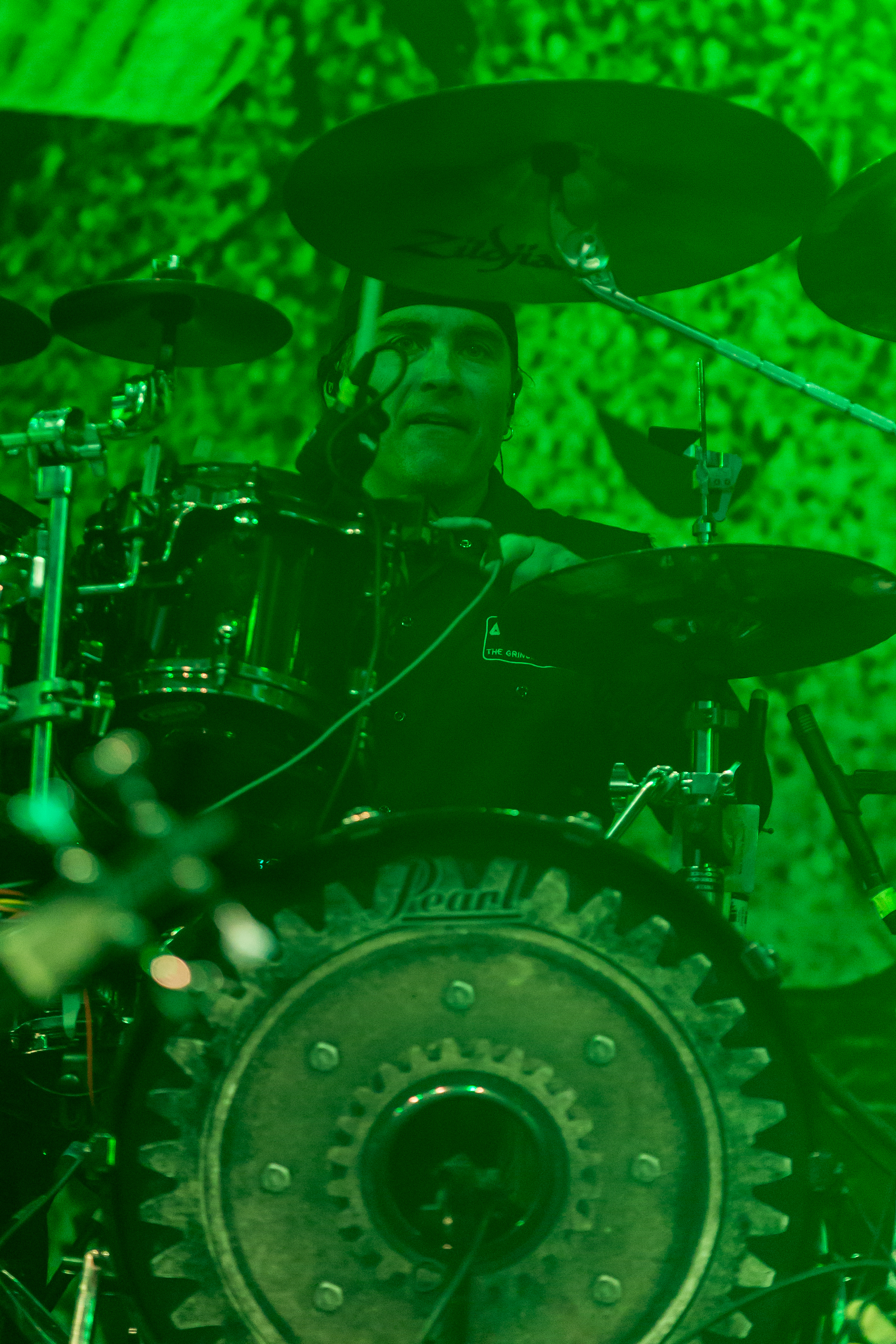
Jason Bittner was the drummer of Overkill from 2017 to 2024.

On May 4, 2017, Overkill announced that Jason Bittner (Shadows Fall and formerly of Flotsam and Jetsam) had replaced Lipnicki as the drummer of the band. Lipnicki later went on to join Whiplash.

On February 9, 2018, Overkill announced that they were in the studio working on demos for its nineteenth studio album. Pre-production of the album began that April, and Ellsworth announced that it would be released in February 2019. On June 1, 2018, the band announced that they had begun recording the album. During an interview with Eddie Trunk on Trunk Nation on October 10, 2018, Verni announced that the album was finished. He was quoted as saying, "I just got the final sequencing and all that, so that's all buttoned up. We're working on the cover now. We still don't have a title — we're gonna have to come up with that soon — but we have a lot of things floating around. And the new release will probably be in February." On November 28, 2018, Overkill announced that the album was titled The Wings of War and would be released on February 22, 2019. The band promoted the album by headlining the 2019 edition of the Killfest Tour, supported by Destruction, Flotsam and Jetsam and Meshiaak, touring North America in the spring with Death Angel and Mothership, and performing at Megadeth's first-ever MegaCruise in the Pacific Ocean that October. They continued to tour in support of The Wings of War in 2020, including touring the U.S. with Exhorder and Hydraform, and appearing at a handful of metal-related festivals in Europe.

In June 2019, it was reported that Overkill was expected to begin writing new material for their 20th studio album by the beginning of 2020. In an interview with Metal Exhumator in October 2019, Ellsworth said, "We just sat down and talked about starting to write in the spring. Maybe late spring, early summer, just say maybe we should just schedule some time to do it. But there's been no ideas with regard to where it's going to go." Bittner revealed in an April 2020 interview with Metal Pilgrim that Verni had written nine songs for the album, but added that plans to enter the studio were postponed due to the COVID-19 pandemic: "So our plan was to start working on new material, but considering the fact that we have to stay in our spaces right now, we're just kind of doing things electronically and it's just given D.D. some more time to write. Because we were kind of on a little bit of a timeline, 'cause we — well, all right, I'll say we had a plan, but everybody had a plan before last month." He mentioned that a European tour in March 2021 to support the album was in the works: "We have no idea if that's gonna even be a possibility right now, because timelines that we had for the record label and whatnot are no longer those anymore, because the record label is shut down and nobody is doing any business right this very second." Ellsworth stated in an interview with A&P Reacts in June 2020 that a new Overkill album was expected to be released in April 2021, with a tour supporting it to follow. Bittner later revealed that the band had recorded 11 demos for the album, and added, "I think right now, the last time I talked to D.D., our idea is to try to start getting drums done, like, September-ish, depending on what happens. The problem is that we really can't do our regular pre-production right now, because we all don't live in the same state." On September 5, 2020, Bittner announced on his Facebook profile that Overkill would enter the studio on September 14 to begin recording their new album. Drum tracks were finished by October, and mixing was handled by Colin Richardson, who had previously worked with Overkill in the late 1990s and early 2000s. In an interview on That Metal Interview in October 2020, Bittner said its release could be pushed back to the fall of 2021 due to the COVID pandemic, explaining, "Lord knows what's gonna happen. God forbid it gets worse. It might even be pushed back even longer. But the point is at least we're gonna get it done." Verni reiterated Bittner's comments about a possible release date, saying, "I don't know. We're trying to coordinate it maybe with some touring. We don't really have any touring till next July, I think, our first shows. We have shows [booked] in July, August, September, October. Whether any of them are gonna happen, I don't know, but probably something like that for the new Overkill release. So I'll be working on that between now and then." Bittner later said the release of the album was pushed back to February 2022. In an August 2021 interview on Trunk Nation With Eddie Trunk, Verni revealed that Overkill was still recording their 20th studio album and planned to mix it in the fall for a March 2022 release coincided with a tour. Ellsworth stated in a March 2022 interview that it was not expected to be released before April 2023.

On November 13, 2021, Overkill performed their first show in "609 f!!kin' days" at the Wellmont Theater in New Jersey. Supported by Demolition Hammer and Sworn Enemy, it was a make-up date for a show initially scheduled for March 14, 2020 but cancelled due to the COVID-19 pandemic. At this show, Phil Demmel (formerly of Machine Head and Vio-lence) filled in for guitarist Dave Linsk, who was unable to perform. Demmel again filled in for him during the band's spring 2022 U.S. tour with Prong.

On December 9, 2022, the band debuted a song, titled "Wicked Place", during their performance at the Ruhrpott Metal Meeting festival in Oberhausen from their then-upcoming 20th studio album. The resulting album, Scorched, was released on April 14, 2023. In support of the album, Overkill embarked on a headlining European and US tour with Exhorder and Heathen. The band performed at the parking lot of the MetLife Stadium in East Rutherford, New Jersey on August 6, 2023, the same day Metallica played at the venue as part of the latter's M72 World Tour. Overkill continued to tour in support of Scorched with a tour over Latin America in April 2024, where former Megadeth bassist David Ellefson filled in for Verni, who was unable to perform due to recovery from shoulder surgery. Verni played his first show back with Overkill at the Milwaukee Metal Fest on May 17, 2024.

Several months after the release of Scorched, Derek Tailer said that Overkill would begin work on their 21st studio album after the Scorched tour in 2024 for a tentative 2025 release.

=== Jeramie Kling-era and upcoming 21st studio album (2024–present) ===
On August 5, 2024, Bittner announced that he was leaving Overkill to focus on Shadows Fall and his new band Category 7. Later that month, it was revealed that Jeramie Kling was the band's new drummer, and he played his first show with Overkill on August 30, at the Posada Rock festival in Câmpulung Muscel, Romania. During the band's summer and fall 2024 European tour, former Kreator bassist Christian "Speesy" Giesler filled in for Verni, who was unable to perform due to an ongoing "shoulder issue". Overkill (along with Night Demon) supported King Diamond on their Saint Lucifer's Hospital 1920 tour in North America from October to December 2024, which saw former Fear Factory and Vio-lence bassist Christian Olde Wolbers fill in for Verni. Also on this tour, the band performed as a four-piece for the first time in years, with Tailer sitting out one show due to illness.

When asked in September 2024 when Overkill would begin work on their 21st studio album, Ellsworth said, "We're looking at, I suppose, the majority of the first half of 2025 as being that timeframe for the writing. And probably recording by the end of 2025 and then releasing in 2026." Kling announced in August 2025 that the band had begun writing and demoing new material for the upcoming album. Ellsworth confirmed in March 2026 that the album would be recorded in the spring/summer for a possible late 2026 release, although Verni later said that it would likely not be released until early 2027.

Overkill toured the U.S. with Testament and Destruction in the spring of 2026. Wolbers once again filled in for Verni on this tour, due to continued issues with his shoulder. During a follow-up tour in Europe, the band once again performed as a four-piece, due to Tailer sitting out dates such as their appearance at Sweden Rock Festival that June, while Wolbers had continued filling in for Verni. Overkill opened for Kreator on their Krushers of the World tour in Europe in November 2026, and the band will also be touring Latin America in February and March 2027.

== Artistry ==
=== Musical style and legacy ===
Overkill's beginnings predate the formation of all of the "Big Four" of thrash metal bands (Metallica, Megadeth, Anthrax and Slayer) by at least one year. While the band is often recognized for its fast and heavy style, their music lacked enough variety to rival the "Big Four"; regardless, Overkill maintained its unique sound throughout its career instead of trying to gain popularity with a more commercial style. The band has been viewed as one of the most important thrash bands from the East Coast, and they are considered to be one of the most active bands of the genre, having never disbanded or gone on hiatus, nor taken more than four years to release an album. The staff of Loudwire named them the 33rd best metal band of all time in 2016. In 2025, Zahra Huselid of Screen Rant included the band in the site's list of "10 Best Thrash Metal Bands Who Weren't The Big Four".

Along with Exodus and Testament, Overkill has been the subject of which thrash metal band should be included in an expanded "Big Four". When asked in September 2014 about the idea of either Overkill, Exodus or Testament being included in the "Big Five" of thrash metal, frontman Bobby Ellsworth said, "Aw man, that's gonna put me in a corner! We measure our success in days, not dollars! But maybe you can find the answer in what I'm going to say. When [playing thrash metal] became harder in the '90s with grunge music, we never had a question about if we would stop doing it and go work for our moms and dads or something. We just needed to make it happen. We weren't going to let grunge stop us. And if it did, we'd just go back to the underground. I liked it there anyway!" Commenting on the fact that Overkill did not become part of the "Big Four", Ellsworth stated, "When it comes to being selected and not selected, that's a simple accounting issue. When you talk numbers, numbers make the world go around, numbers put food on your table, and numbers put the 'Big Four' in arenas. And they sell enough records to do that. For me, it's not a concern. To even be asked the question from you is quite a compliment with regard to, let's say, our longevity or tenacity doing what we like doing. But this is quite simply an accounting issue. He who sells the most gets the pole positions."

Overkill's sound has influenced the genre of thrash metal. Their technique draws on bits and pieces of punk and hard rock as well as the new wave of British heavy metal (NWOBHM). These elements blend to create a fast, aggressive style unique to the band and make Overkill's sound easily recognizable to metal fans; as a result, they have been referred to as "the Motörhead of thrash metal."

Overkill has been cited as an influence by Pantera, Sepultura, Slipknot, Hatebreed, and Dope, as well as bands from the so-called "thrash metal revival" scene of the 2000s, including Evile, Havok and Mantic Ritual, the latter of whom incorporates a variety of stylistic traits reminiscent of Overkill and other thrash bands that had found success in the past. The band has also been cited as an influence on the groove metal genre; Pantera guitarist Dimebag Darrell had cited Bobby Gustafson's performance on the albums Under the Influence and The Years of Decay as one of the sources of inspiration behind the band's transition from glam metal to thrash/groove metal, as well as The Years of Decay producer Terry Date's production for Pantera's 1990 album Cowboys from Hell.

=== Influences ===
Overkill has been influenced by a variety of music, including heavy metal, hard rock and progressive rock acts such as Black Sabbath, Led Zeppelin, Deep Purple, Iron Maiden, Accept, Judas Priest, the Who, Aerosmith, Rush, Kiss, Alice Cooper, Queen, UFO, Jethro Tull, Motörhead, Saxon, Venom, Ted Nugent, Humble Pie, Rainbow, Manowar, Wishbone Ash and Starz, as well as punk rock and glam rock acts such as the Ramones, the Sex Pistols, the Damned, the New York Dolls, Lou Reed, the Vibrators, Generation X, and the Dead Boys.

== Band members ==
Current

- Carlo "D.D." Verni – bass, backing vocals (1980–present)
- Bobby "Blitz" Ellsworth – lead vocals (1980–present)
- Dave Linsk – lead guitar, backing vocals (1999–present)
- Derek Tailer – rhythm guitar, backing vocals (2001–present)
- Jeramie Kling – drums (2024–present)

== Discography ==
- Feel the Fire (1985)
- Taking Over (1987)
- Under the Influence (1988)
- The Years of Decay (1989)
- Horrorscope (1991)
- I Hear Black (1993)
- W.F.O. (1994)
- The Killing Kind (1996)
- From the Underground and Below (1997)
- Necroshine (1999)
- Bloodletting (2000)
- Killbox 13 (2003)
- ReliXIV (2005)
- Immortalis (2007)
- Ironbound (2010)
- The Electric Age (2012)
- White Devil Armory (2014)
- The Grinding Wheel (2017)
- The Wings of War (2019)
- Scorched (2023)

== Awards and nominations ==
Decibel Hall of Fame
Year	Nominee / work	Award	Result
2012	The Years of Decay	Hall of Fame	Inducted

Loudwire Music Awards
Year	Nominee / work	Award	Result
2012	Bobby "Blitz" Ellsworth	Vocalist of the Year	Nominated
2014	"Armorist"	Death Match Hall of Fame	Won
2015	"Armorist"	Metal Song of the Year	Nominated
2015	White Devil Armory	Metal Album of the Year	Nominated

Metal Storm Awards
Year	Nominee / work	Award	Result
2010	Ironbound	Best Thrash Metal Album	Nominated
2012	The Electric Age	Best Thrash Metal Album	Nominated
2014	White Devil Armory	Best Thrash Metal Album	Won
2017	The Grinding Wheel	Best Thrash Metal Album	Nominated
2019	The Wings of War	Best Thrash Metal Album	Nominated
