= The Years of Decay =

1989 studio album by Overkill

Studio album by Overkill
- Released: October 13, 1989
- Recorded: June–July 1989
- Studio: Carriage House, Stamford, Connecticut
- Genre: Thrash metal
- Length: 56:17
- Label: Atlantic, Megaforce
- Producer: Overkill, Terry Date

Overkill chronology
Under the Influence (1988)	The Years of Decay (1989)	Horrorscope (1991)

Singles from The Years of Decay
- 1. "Elimination" Released: 1989

The Years of Decay is the fourth studio album by thrash metal band Overkill, released on October 13, 1989, through Atlantic and Megaforce Records. It is the last Overkill album to feature guitarist Bobby Gustafson, who either left or was fired by the band amid a feud between himself and its founding members Bobby "Blitz" Ellsworth (vocalist) and D. D. Verni (bassist). The Years of Decay was also the first of two Overkill albums produced by Terry Date, who took on the same role for their follow-up album Horrorscope (1991).

It is considered an essential release in the thrash metal genre. The album remains popular among collectors of physical media.

== Production and musical style ==
Musically, The Years of Decay features Overkill's most progressive and diverse work compared to their previous albums. The album also has elements of doom metal. Ellsworth has cited Black Sabbath as being an influence on the band writing and recording longer pieces, specifically their longest track to date "Playing with Spiders/Skullkrusher". Gustafson has also acknowledged Terry Date's production of the album as an improvement from its predecessor, Under the Influence:

I don't know what happened with the tone of Under the Influence. For me, each album we kind of overdid the next one. Like the first album [Feel the Fire] was a little weak on guitar. It really wasn't the sound I was going for, actually my equipment blew up in the studio and I think we overdid it with Taking Over where it was too much. And then we tried to get it back in your face again with Under the Influence and it was little too dry. I mean we had Michael Wagener, and you know he did [Metallica's] Master of Puppets and can't get any better than that, but it just didn't come out right either. In comes Terry Date and he nailed it.

== Touring and promotion ==
Overkill spent nearly eight months touring in support of The Years of Decay, starting in November 1989 with a headlining U.S. trek supported by Wolfsbane and Dark Angel. The band spent the first half of 1990 touring relentlessly to support the album; it started with an East Coast tour supported by Powermad and Mordred, who also supported Overkill on the European leg of the tour. The band toured the U.S. in March and April 1990 with Vio-lence and Excel, followed by three shows in Japan in May and another U.S. tour the following month.

To date, all songs from The Years of Decay have been played live except "Nothing to Die For". According to frontman Bobby "Blitz" Ellsworth, "E.vil N.ever D.ies" is a continuation of the self-titled "Overkill" series of songs from the band's three previous albums, but was not named "Overkill IV"; this would be the last song of the series until Immortalis (2007), which features the most recent part in "Overkill V... The Brand".

== Reception and legacy ==
Professional ratings
Review scores
Source	Rating
AllMusic	4/5 stars

Jason Anderson at AllMusic gave The Years of Decay a positive review, awarding it four stars out of five. He called it a "classic by the group's fans", and that it "is often mentioned as the pinnacle of the East Coast thrashers' recording career". The album reached No. 155 on the U.S. Billboard 200 and remained on that chart for eight weeks, making it Overkill's fourth highest-charting release to date. By May 2000 it had sold over 67,000 copies in the U.S., according to Nielsen SoundScan. Although the album's only single "Elimination" never appeared on the charts, its music video received regular rotation on MTV's Headbangers Ball, and the song remains a staple in Overkill's live repertoire.

In August 2014, Revolver magazine placed the album on its list of "14 Thrash Albums You Need to Own". It was also ranked fifth on Loudwire's top ten list of "Thrash Albums NOT Released by the Big 4".

The Years of Decay has been seen as a major influence and inspiration to the groove metal scene that emerged in the early 1990s. Pantera had reportedly hired Terry Date to produce Cowboys from Hell based on his production of this album as well as Bobby Gustafson's guitar tone, which had influenced Dimebag Darrell and the band's transition away from glam to thrash/groove metal.

== Track listing ==
All tracks are written by Overkill.

No.	Title	Length
1.	"Time to Kill"	6:16
2.	"Elimination"	4:35
3.	"I Hate"	3:46
4.	"Nothing to Die For"	4:22
5.	"Playing with Spiders/Skullkrusher"	10:15
6.	"Birth of Tension"	5:04
7.	"Who Tends the Fire"	8:12
8.	"The Years of Decay"	7:58
9.	"E.vil N.ever D.ies"	5:49
Total length:		56:17

== Personnel ==
- Bobby "Blitz" Ellsworth – lead vocals
- D.D. Verni – bass
- Bobby Gustafson – guitars
- Sid Falck – drums

Additional personnel

- Overkill – production
- The Satones – backing vocals
- Terry Date – engineering, production
- Matt Lane – engineering
- Howie Weinberg – mastering
- Jon Zazula, Marsha Zazula – executive production
- Steve Fastner, Rich Larson – cover illustration

== Charts ==
Chart (1989)	Peak position
German Albums (Offizielle Top 100)	58
US Billboard 200	155
