= Ironbound (album) =

2010 studio album by Overkill

Studio album by Overkill
- Released: January 29, 2010
- Recorded: July–September 2009
- Studios: Gear Recording Studio, Shrewsbury, New Jersey
- Genre: Thrash metal
- Length: 57:50
- Labels: eOne Music (North America); Nuclear Blast (Europe)
- Producer: Overkill

Overkill chronology
Immortalis (2007)	Ironbound (2010)	The Electric Age (2012)

Ironbound is the fifteenth studio album by thrash metal band Overkill, which was released on January 29, 2010 in Europe on Nuclear Blast and in the U.S. on February 9, 2010 on eOne Music. It was their first studio album in more than two years since the release of Immortalis in the fall of 2007, and their first release on their current label Nuclear Blast.

== Reception ==
Professional ratings
Review scores
Source	Rating
About.com	4/5 stars
AllMusic	4/5 stars
Blabbermouth.net	9.5/10 stars
PopMatters	8/10 stars

Ironbound was given highly positive reviews with vocalist, Bobby "Blitz" Ellsworth, being a main point of critical acclaim. Chad Bowar of About.com states, "What makes Overkill stand out is vocalist Bobby “Blitz” Ellsworth, whose high pitched singing is unique and instantly recognizable. He's able to dial it down and sing in a lower range, but can wail when it's required." A review from Blabbermouth.net says, ""Ironbound" is one of, if not the most ripping collection of tunes this legendary act has laid to tape." Exodus and former Slayer lead guitarist Gary Holt called Ironbound "one of their best records ever; it's so good".

Ironbound was Overkill's first album to chart on the Billboard 200 in 17 years, since I Hear Black in 1993. It sold over 4,100 copies in its first week in the U.S. and over 15,000 copies in the U.S by May 2010. Ironbound has been referred to as a "comeback" for Overkill after years of lackluster album sales, as well as an experimentation with groove metal and a decline in popularity in the U.S., which the band had had since the mid-1990s.

== Track listing ==
All music is composed by D.D. Verni and Bobby 'Blitz' Ellsworth.

No.	Title	Length
1.	"The Green and Black"	8:12
2.	"Ironbound"	6:33
3.	"Bring Me the Night"	4:16
4.	"The Goal Is Your Soul"	6:41
5.	"Give a Little"	4:42
6.	"Endless War"	5:41
7.	"The Head and Heart"	5:10
8.	"In Vain"	5:13
9.	"Killing for a Living"	6:14
10.	"The SRC"	5:08
Total length:		57:50

== Charts ==
Chart (2010)	Peak position
Billboard Top Heatseekers	4
Top Independent Albums	24
Top Hard Rock Albums	20
U.S. Billboard 200	192
Germany	31
Austria	61
Switzerland	77
Tastemaker Albums	14

== Credits ==
Writing, performance and production credits are adapted from the album liner notes.

=== Personnel ===
Overkill

- Bobby "Blitz" Ellsworth – lead vocals
- D.D. Verni – bass, backing vocals
- Dave Linsk – lead guitar
- Derek Tailer – rhythm guitar
- Ron Lipnicki – drums

Production

- Overkill – production
- Peter Tägtgren – mixing (at The Abyss)
- D.D. Verni, Dave Linsk – engineering
- Jonas Kjellgren – mastering
- Jon "Jonnyrod" Ciorciari – recording (at JRod Productions)
- Dave Linsk – recording (at SKH Recording Studios)
- Dan Korneff – editing

Artwork and design

- Travis Smith – cover art, layout
- Eddie Malluk – photography

=== Studios ===
- The Abyss, Ludvika, Sweden – mixing
- Gear Recording Studio, Shrewsbury, New Jersey – recording
- JRod Productions, Pomona, New York – additional recording
- SKH Recording Studios, Stuart, Florida – additional recording
