= Coverkill =

1999 cover album by Overkill

Compilation album of cover songs by Overkill
- Released: October 26, 1999
- Genre: Thrash metal
- Length: 43:22
- Label: SPV/Steamhammer
- Producer: Overkill & Andy Katz

Overkill chronology
Necroshine (1999)	Coverkill (1999)	Bloodletting (2000)

Professional ratings
Review scores
Source	Rating
AllMusic	2.5/5 stars

Coverkill is a cover album by thrash metal band Overkill, released in 1999. The album consists of cover songs by artists that influenced the band, including Deep Purple, Black Sabbath, Motörhead, Kiss, Judas Priest, Jethro Tull, Ramones, Sex Pistols, the Dead Boys, and Manowar. This was Overkill's first release with guitarist Dave Linsk.

== Track listing ==
No.	Title	Writer(s)	Length
1.	"Overkill (live)" (Originally released on the Overkill album)	Motörhead	4:16
2.	"No Feelings" (Originally released on the Never Mind the Bollocks, Here's the Sex Pistols album)	Sex Pistols	2:37
3.	"Hymn 43" (Originally released on the Aqualung album)	Jethro Tull	2:59
4.	"Changes" (Originally released on the Black Sabbath, Vol. 4 album)	Black Sabbath	4:58
5.	"Space Truckin'" (Originally released on the Machine Head album)	Deep Purple	4:00
6.	"Deuce" (Originally released on the Kiss album)	Kiss	3:05
7.	"Never Say Die! (Black Sabbath)" (Originally released on the Never Say Die! album)	Black Sabbath	3:24
8.	"Death Tone" (Originally released on the Battle Hymns album)	Manowar	4:24
9.	"Cornucopia (Black Sabbath)" (Originally released on the Black Sabbath, Vol. 4 album)	Black Sabbath	4:46
10.	"Tyrant" (Originally released on the Sad Wings of Destiny album)	Judas Priest	4:00
11.	"Ain't Nothin' to Do" (Originally released on the Young, Loud and Snotty album)	Dead Boys	2:13
12.	"I'm Against It" (Originally released on the Road to Ruin album)	Ramones	2:43
Total length:			43:22

== Personnel ==
- Bobby Ellsworth – lead vocals
- D. D. Verni – bass, backing vocals
- Dave Linsk – guitar on a few tracks
- Joe Comeau – guitar, vocals
- Sebastian Marino - guitar
- Tim Mallare – drums

=== Additional personnel ===
- Merritt Gant – guitars, backing vocals (track 11)
- Rob Cannavino – guitars, backing vocals (track 11)
- Bobby Gustafson – guitars, backing vocals (track 12)
- Sid Falck – drums (tracks 11, 12)
- Andy Katz – producer, engineer, mixing, mastering (tracks 1, 3, 4, 6 – 9, 11)
- Colin Richardson – mixing (tracks 2 – 5)
- Alex Perialas – mixing (track 12)
- Howie Weinberg - mastering (tracks 2 – 5)
