= Wrecking Your Neck =

1995 live album by Overkill

Live album by Overkill
- Released: May 30, 1995
- Recorded: January–February 1995
- Genre: Thrash metal, groove metal
- Length: 97:11
- Label: CMC

Overkill chronology
W.F.O. (1994)	Wrecking Your Neck (1995)	The Killing Kind (1996)

Professional ratings
Review scores
Source	Rating
AllMusic	2.5/5 stars

Wrecking Your Neck is the first live album by thrash metal band Overkill, released in 1995. A March 1995 show, once again in Cleveland, Ohio, was recorded for Overkill's first full-length live album and was released in April 1995; with the first pressing featuring a bonus CD containing the Overkill EP that had been out of print for ten years. A music video for the song "Bastard Nation" was also released. Wrecking Your Neck is also the last Overkill album to feature guitarists Rob Cannavino and Merritt Gant, and their first release on CMC, following the end of their near-decade-long tenure with Atlantic Records.

== Track listing ==
Disk 1
No.	Title	Length
1.	"Where It Hurts"	7:26
2.	"Infectious"	4:05
3.	"Coma"	3:59
4.	"Supersonic Hate"	4:43
5.	"Wrecking Crew"	1:09
6.	"Powersurge"	4:13
7.	"The Wait/New High in Lows"	6:10
8.	"Skullkrusher"	6:23
9.	"Spiritual Void"	4:52
10.	"Hello From the Gutter"	2:35
11.	"Anxiety" (Instrumental)	1:50
12.	"Elimination"	5:07
13.	"Fast Junkie"	4:04
14.	"World of Hurt"	4:59
Total length:		61:42

Disk 2
No.	Title	Length
1.	"Gasoline Dream"	7:40
2.	"Rotten to the Core"	5:38
3.	"Horrorscope"	5:58
4.	"Under One"	3:54
5.	"New Machine"	4:21
6.	"Thanx for Nothing"	5:03
7.	"Bastard Nation"	5:57
8.	"Fuck You/War Pigs"	7:03
Total length:		45:38

== Personnel ==
- Bobby "Blitz" Ellsworth – lead vocals
- D.D. Verni – bass, backing vocals
- Merritt Gant – guitars, backing vocals
- Rob Cannavino – guitars, backing vocals
- Tim Mallare – drums
