= Wrecking Everything =

2002 live album by Overkill

Live album by Overkill
- Released: June 18, 2002
- Recorded: March 23, 2002
- Venue: The Paramount, Asbury Park, New Jersey
- Genre: Thrash metal
- Length: 70:52
- Label: Spitfire
- Producer: Overkill

Overkill chronology
Bloodletting (2000)	Wrecking Everything (2002)	Killbox 13 (2003)

Professional ratings
Review scores
Source	Rating
AllMusic	link

Wrecking Everything is a 2002 live album by thrash metal band Overkill which is the counterpart to Wrecking Everything – An Evening in Asbury Park VHS/DVD. Recorded at The Paramount, Asbury Park, New Jersey on March 23, 2002. As of 2006, the album had sold over 5,300 copies and according to Bobby "Blitz" Ellsworth, the VHS/DVD has sold around 15,000–20,000 copies in the U.S.

== Track listing ==
All music is composed by D.D. Verni and Bobby 'Blitz' Ellsworth.

No.	Title	Length
1.	"Necroshine"	5:56
2.	"Thunderhead"	6:22
3.	"E.vil N.ever D.ies"	4:42
4.	"Deny the Cross"	5:11
5.	"I Hate"	3:54
6.	"Shred"	3:55
7.	"Bleed Me"	4:28
8.	"Long Time Dyin'"	7:23
9.	"It Lives"	4:26
10.	"Battle"	5:28
11.	"The Years of Decay"	9:51
12.	"In Union We Stand"	5:09
13.	"Overkill"	4:02
Total length:		70:52

== Credits ==
=== Personnel ===
- Bobby "Blitz" Ellsworth – lead vocals
- D.D. Verni – bass, backing vocals
- Dave Linsk – lead guitar, backing vocals
- Derek Tailer – rhythm guitar, backing vocals
- Tim Mallare – drums

=== Production ===
- Produced by Overkill
