= White Devil Armory =

2014 studio album by Overkill

Studio album by Overkill
- Released: July 18, 2014
- Recorded: August 2013–March 2014
- Studio: Gear Recording Studio, Shrewsbury, New Jersey
- Genre: Thrash metal
- Length: 50:41
- Label: eOne Music (North America); Nuclear Blast (Europe)
- Producer: Overkill

Overkill chronology
| The Electric Age (2012) | White Devil Armory (2014) | Historikill: 1995–2007 (2015) |

White Devil Armory is the seventeenth studio album by thrash metal band Overkill. It was released on July 18, 2014 in Europe through Nuclear Blast and July 22 in North America through eOne Music.

== Reception and sales ==
Professional ratings
Review scores
| Source | Rating |
|---|---|
| AllMusic | 3.4/5 stars |
| Blabbermouth.net | (8.5/10) |
| All About The Rock | (9/10) |
| Metal Forces | (8.5/10) |

White Devil Armory has received mostly positive reviews. AllMusic's Gregory Heaney awarded White Devil Armory three-and-a-half stars out of five, and called it "a monument to classic thrash that makes it clear the band's recent form is far from a fluke." He also stated that "the album finds the band once again going from strength to strength, pursuing their muse with a relentless vigor that imbues their sound with a refreshing directness".

Reviewing the album for Get Your Rock Out, Michael Dodd cited the bass work of Verni as one of the record's strengths. He argued that Verni imbued the song "Bitter Pill" with "a heaviness that is almost industrial", and concluded that while the whole album is a "thrash juggernaut", it is the exploits of the bassist that make certain songs stand out.

George Nisbet writing for All About The Rock said "If they can continue to release records of this calibre, then we've got some great music to look forward to. If you like quality thrash, you will absolutely love this!!".

White Devil Armory was Overkill's most successful album; it peaked at number 31 on the Billboard 200, making it Overkill's highest chart position in their career and it sold 8,600 copies in its first week in the U.S. In its second week, the album sold over 2,850 copies in the U.S., bringing the sales to over 11,000 copies and dropping to number 99 on the Billboard 200. On the third week, the album dropped to number 158 on the Billboard 200 and sold 1,850 copies, totalling over 13,000 copies sold in its first 3 weeks. It won a 2014 Metal Storm Award for Best Thrash Metal Album.

== Track listing ==
All tracks are written by D. D. Verni and Bobby Ellsworth.

Main album
| No. | Title | Length |
|---|---|---|
| 1. | "XD^{M}" | 0:49 |
| 2. | "Armorist" | 3:53 |
| 3. | "Down to the Bone" | 4:04 |
| 4. | "Pig" | 5:21 |
| 5. | "Bitter Pill" | 5:48 |
| 6. | "Where There's Smoke..." | 4:20 |
| 7. | "Freedom Rings" | 6:52 |
| 8. | "Another Day to Die" | 4:56 |
| 9. | "King of the Rat Bastards" | 4:09 |
| 10. | "It's All Yours" | 4:26 |
| 11. | "In the Name" | 6:03 |
| Total length: | | 50:41 |

Bonus tracks
| No. | Title | Length |
|---|---|---|
| 12. | "The Fight Song" | 5:12 |
| 13. | "Miss Misery" (feat. Mark Tornillo; Nazareth cover) | 4:31 |
| Total length: | | 60:25 |

== Credits ==
Writing, performance and production credits are adapted from the album liner notes.

=== Personnel ===
Overkill

- Bobby Ellsworth – lead vocals
- D. D. Verni – bass, backing vocals
- Dave Linsk – lead guitar
- Derek Tailer – rhythm guitar
- Ron Lipnicki – drums

Additional musicians

- Mark Tornillo – backing vocals on "Miss Misery"

Production

- Overkill – production
- Greg Reely – mixing, mastering
- D.D. Verni, Dave Linsk – engineering
- Dan Korneff – editing
- Dave Linsk – recording (at SKH Recording Studios)
- Jon Ciorciari – recording (at JRod Productions)
- Jon D'Uva – additional recording
- Rob Shallcross – additional editing

Artwork and design

- Travis Smith – cover art, layout
- Hakon Grav, Nico Ramos – photography
- Mike Romeo – orchestrations

=== Studios ===
- Gear Recording Studio, Shrewsbury, New Jersey – recording
- SKH Studios, Stuart, Florida – additional recording
- JRod Productions, Pomona, New York – additional recording

== Charts ==
| Chart (2014) | Peak position |
|---|---|
| Austrian Albums (Ö3 Austria) | 53 |
| Belgian Albums (Ultratop Flanders) | 168 |
| Belgian Albums (Ultratop Wallonia) | 142 |
| Finnish Albums (Suomen virallinen lista) | 28 |
| German Albums (Offizielle Top 100) | 20 |
| Hungarian Albums (MAHASZ) | 28 |
| Japanese Albums (Oricon) | 91 |
| South Korean International Albums (Circle) | 26 |
| Swiss Albums (Schweizer Hitparade) | 31 |
| UK Independent Albums (OCC) | 22 |
| UK Rock & Metal Albums (OCC) | 12 |
| US Billboard 200 | 31 |
| US Independent Albums (Billboard) | 5 |
| US Top Hard Rock Albums (Billboard) | 3 |
| US Top Rock Albums (Billboard) | 10 |
| US Indie Store Album Sales (Billboard) | 4 |
