= Fuck You (EP) =

1987 extended play by Overkill

EP by Overkill
- Released: Late 1987
- Recorded: June 3, 1987
- Venue: Phantasy Theater, Cleveland, Ohio
- Genre: Thrash metal
- Length: 24:35
- Label: Megaforce
- Producer: Alex Perialas & Overkill

Overkill EP chronology
Taking Over (1987)	Fuck You (1987)	Under the Influence (1988)

Professional ratings
Review scores
Source	Rating
AllMusic	link

Fuck You (stylized as !!!Fuck You!!!) is an EP released by thrash metal band Overkill in 1987. Consisting of a cover version of the song "Fuck You" (originally by The Subhumans), the EP also featured 5 live tracks recorded at Phantasy Theater in Cleveland, Ohio. Long out of print, the EP is now extremely rare, but was re-released in 1997 with extra tracks as !!!Fuck You!!! and Then Some.

Both the cassette version of the original 1987 release and the 1990 CD reissue were sold with reversible cover art. When sold in stores, the visible side was a full sheet of white with the band's logo, the album name reading as !!!**** You!!!, and a subhead that read "The Record THEY tried to ban". A Parental Advisory logo appeared in the lower right corner on the CD. The original cover art was able to be used if the booklet/J-card was opened and reversed by creasing the cover the opposite way. One pressing was sold in a black plastic bag. As of 2006, Fuck You had sold over 6,000 copies in the U.S. since the beginning of the SoundScan era.

== Track listing ==
All tracks are written by Overkill, except where noted.

No.	Title	Writer(s)	Length
1.	"Fuck You" (The Subhumans cover)	Gerry Useless	2:21
2.	"Rotten to the Core" (Live)		6:41
3.	"Hammerhead" (Live)		3:57
4.	"Use Your Head" (Live)		5:19
5.	"Electro-Violence" (Live)		3:50
6.	"Fuck You" (Live, CD bonus track, The Subhumans cover)	Gerry Useless	2:27
Total length:			24:35
