= Bobby Ellsworth =

American singer (born 1959)

Bobby "Blitz" Ellsworth
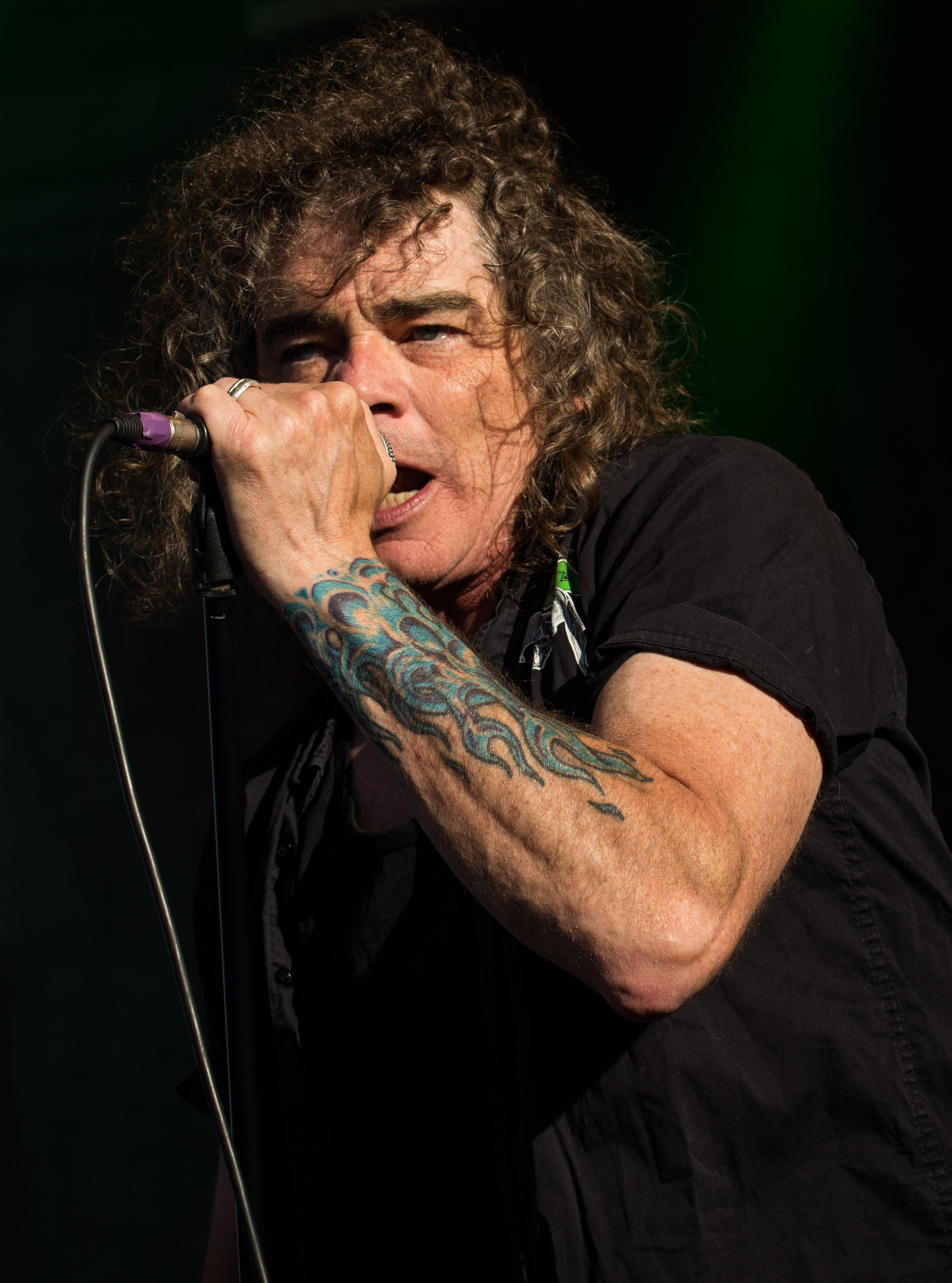
- Ellsworth in 2015

Background information
- Also known as: Blitz
- Born: Robert Ellsworth; May 3, 1959 (age 67)
- Origin: New Jersey, U.S.
- Genres: Thrash metal, heavy metal, groove metal
- Occupation: Singer
- Years active: 1980–present
- Member of: Overkill, BPMD
- Formerly of: The Cursed

Robert Ellsworth (born May 3, 1959), best known as Bobby "Blitz" Ellsworth, is an American singer who is the lead vocalist of New Jersey thrash metal band Overkill. He has been the vocalist of Overkill since its inception in 1980, and he and bassist D. D. Verni are the band's only constant members.

Ellsworth is a member of the supergroup cover band BPMD. He also previously fronted The Cursed, a now defunct band featuring guitarist Dan Lorenzo, which released the Room Full of Sinners LP in 2007.

== Personal life ==
In 1998, Ellsworth was diagnosed with a very aggressive form of nose cancer and underwent immediate surgery, which successfully removed the tumor.

Ellsworth had a focal seizure in Germany in June 2002, right in the middle of the song "Necroshine". He commented: "The beauty of a stroke is that you don't remember. I don't know what it changed, because I forget how it used to be (laughs). Occasionally I piss my pants when somebody turns a microwave on (laughs). I'm riding my motorcycle. I still swim, I work out. The idea is that when you have a problem, there's two ways to look at it – you can live in the problem or you can live through the problem. For me, I just lived through it. I thought very soon afterwards if it had actually killed me, I said 'Wouldn't it be something to die in the middle of an Overkill show?'."

Ellsworth was critical of the Obama administration. In a 2010 interview, he was asked if he felt that Obama would spawn any songs about political awareness and replied, "You could probably just do one record and call it 'Liar' (laughs)" He then outlined instances where he believed the party displayed hypocrisy and called the Democratic Party "just an awful thing."

In 2014, Ellsworth again faced health issues, battling borderline pneumonia during a German tour.

Ellsworth has been a resident of Vernon Township, New Jersey.
