= Book size =

Form a book is produced into

Comparison of some book sizes based on American Library Association

The size of a book is generally measured by the height against the width of a leaf, or sometimes the height and width of its cover. A series of terms is commonly used by libraries and publishers for the general sizes of modern books, ranging from folio (the largest), to quarto (smaller) and octavo (still smaller). Historically, these terms referred to the format of the book, a technical term used by printers and bibliographers to indicate the size of a leaf in terms of the size of the original sheet. For example, a quarto (from Latin quartō, ablative form of quartus, fourth) historically was a book printed on sheets of paper folded in half twice, with the first fold at right angles to the second, to produce 4 leaves (or 8 pages), each leaf one fourth the size of the original sheet printed – note that a leaf refers to the single piece of paper, whereas a page is one side of a leaf. Because the actual format of many modern books cannot be determined from examination of the books, bibliographers may not use these terms in scholarly descriptions.

== Book formats ==
In the hand press period (up to about 1820) books were manufactured by printing text on both sides of a full sheet of paper and then folding the paper one or more times into a group of leaves or gathering. The binder would sew the gatherings (sometimes also called signatures) through their inner hinges and attached to cords in the spine to form the book block. Before the covers were bound to the book, the block of text pages was sometimes trimmed along the three unbound edges to open the folds of the paper and to produce smooth edges for the book. When the leaves were not trimmed, the reader would have to cut open the leaf edges using a knife.

Traditional book sizes/formats used in English-speaking countries. Based on the 19-by-24-inch or 482.5-by-609.5-millimetre printing paper size, which equals two folio leaves, four quarto leaves, eight octavo leaves, etc. For comparison, common American letter size is shown in green.

Books made by printing two pages of text on each side of a sheet of paper, which is then folded once to form two leaves or four pages, are referred to as folios (from Latin, foliō, ablative of folium, leaf). Those made by printing four text pages on each side of a sheet of paper and folding the paper twice to form a gathering containing four leaves or eight pages are called quartos (fourths). Similarly, books made by printing eight pages of text on each side of a sheet, which was then folded three times to form gatherings of eight leaves or sixteen pages each, are called octavos. The size of the resulting pages in these cases depends, of course, on the size of the full sheet used to print them and how much the leaves were trimmed before binding, but where the same size paper is used, folios are the largest, followed by quartos and then octavos. The proportion of leaves of quartos tends to be squarer than that of folios or octavos.

These various production methods are referred to as the format of the book. These terms are often abbreviated, using 4to for quarto, 8vo for octavo, and so on. The octavo format, with eight leaves per gathering, has half the page size of the quarto format before trimming. Smaller formats include the duodecimo (12mo or twelvemo), with twelve leaves per sheet and pages one-third the size of the quarto format, and the sextodecimo (16mo or sixteenmo), with sixteen leaves per sheet, half the size of the octavo format and one quarter the size of the quarto. The vast majority of books were printed in the folio, quarto, octavo or duodecimo formats.

There are many variations in how such books were produced. For example, folios were rarely made by simply binding up a group of two leaf gatherings; instead several printed leaf pairs would be inserted within another, to produce a larger gathering of multiple leaves that would be more convenient for binding. For example, three two-leaf printed sheets might be inserted in a fourth, producing gatherings of eight leaves or sixteen pages each. Bibliographers still refer to such books as folios (and not octavos) because the original full sheets were folded once to produce two leaves, and describe such gatherings as folios in 8s. Similarly, a book printed as an octavo, but bound with gatherings of four leaves each, is called an octavo in 4s.

In determining the format of a book, bibliographers will study the number of leaves in a gathering, their proportion and sizes and also the arrangement of the chain lines and watermarks in the paper.

In order for the pages to come out in the correct order, the printers would have to properly lay out the pages of type in the printing press. For example, to print two leaves in folio containing pages 1 through 4, the printer would print pages 1 and 4 on one side of the sheet and, after that has dried, print pages 2 and 3 on the other side. If a printer was printing a folio in 8s, as described above, he would have to print pages 1 and 16 on one side of a leaf with pages 2 and 15 on the other side of that leaf, etc. The arrangement of the pages of type in the press is referred to as the imposition and there are a number of methods of imposing pages for the various formats, some of which involve cutting the printed pages before binding.

See Further reading for more on imposition schemes.

== Modern book production ==
As printing and paper technology developed, it became possible to produce and to print on much larger sheets or rolls of paper and it may not be apparent (or even possible to determine) from examination of a modern book how the paper was folded to produce them. For example, a modern novel may consist of gatherings of sixteen leaves, but may actually have been printed with sixty-four pages on each side of a very large sheet of paper. Similarly, the actual printing format cannot be determined for books that are perfect bound, where every leaf in the book is completely cut out (i.e., not conjugate to another leaf as in gatherings) and is glued into the spine. Modern books are commonly called folio, quarto and octavo based simply on their size rather than the format in which they were actually produced, if that can even be determined. Scholarly bibliographers may describe such books based on the number of leaves in each gathering (eight leaves per gathering forming an octavo), even where the actual number of pages printed on the original sheet is unknown or may reject the use of these terms for modern books entirely. (Note: Cf. Bowers, suggesting that a book with eight leaves per gathering where the format cannot be determined should be referred to as in 8s and not octavo.)

Today, octavo and quarto are the most common book sizes, but many books are produced in larger and smaller sizes as well. Other terms for book size have developed, an elephant folio being up to 580 mm (23 in) tall, an atlas folio 640 mm (25 in), and a double elephant folio 1,300 mm (50 in) tall.

== Paper sizes ==
During the hand press period, full sheets of printing paper were manufactured in a great variety of sizes which were given a number of names, such as pot, demy, foolscap, crown, etc. These were not standardized and the actual sizes varied across countries and times.

The size and proportions of a book depend on the size of the original full sheet. If a sheet 480 by 640 mm (19 by 25 in) is used to print a quarto, the resulting untrimmed pages, will be approximately half as large in each dimension: width 240 mm (9 1/2 in) and height 320 mm (12 1/2 in). An octavo page, oriented a quarter turn from the full sheet, would have height 240 mm (9 1/2 in)—1/2 in × 19—and width 160 mm (6 1/4 in)—1/4 in × 25. The sizes of books of the same format will differ in proportion to the full sheets used to print them. For example, a typical octavo printed in Italy or France in the 16th century is roughly the size of a modern mass market paperback book, but an English 18th-century octavo is noticeably larger, more like a modern trade paperback or hardcover novel.

== Common formats and sizes ==
=== United States and traditional United Kingdom ===
The following table is adapted from the scale of the American Library Association, which uses a basis sheet of 19-by-25-inch (483 by 635 mm) which is, confusingly if not explained by the source, half the text/book stock sheet of 25-by-38-inch (635 by 965 mm), and in which size refers to the dimensions of the cover (trimmed pages will be somewhat smaller, often by about 1/4 inch or 5 mm). The words before octavo signify the traditional names for unfolded paper sheet sizes. Other dimensions may exist as well. US Trade size corresponds with octavo and is popular for hardbacks. Mass market paperback corresponds with duodecimo.

US book formats and corresponding sizes
Name	Abbreviations	Leaves	Pages	Approximate cover size (width × height)	
Name	Abbreviations	Leaves	Pages	inch × inch	mm × mm
folio	2º or fo	2	4	12 × 19	305 × 483
quarto	4º or 4to	4	8	9 1/2 × 12	241 × 305
Imperial octavo	8º or 8vo	8	16	8 1/4 × 11 1/2	210 × 292
Super octavo	8º or 8vo	8	16	7 × 11	178 × 279
Royal octavo	8º or 8vo	8	16	6 1/4 × 10	159 × 254
Medium octavo	8º or 8vo	8	16	6 1/2 × 9 1/4	165 × 235
octavo	8º or 8vo	8	16	6 × 9	152 × 229
Crown octavo	8º or 8vo	8	16	5 3/8 × 8	137 × 203
duodecimo or twelvemo	12º or 12mo	12	24	5 × 7 3/8	127 × 187
sextodecimo or sixteenmo	16º or 16mo	16	32	4 × 6 3/4	102 × 171
octodecimo or eighteenmo	18º or 18mo	18	36	4 × 6 1/2	102 × 165
trigesimo-secundo or thirty-twomo	32º or 32mo	32	64	3 1/2 × 5 1/2	89 × 140
quadragesimo-octavo or forty-eightmo	48º or 48mo	48	96	2 1/2 × 4	63.5 × 102
sexagesimo-quarto or sixty-fourmo	64º or 64mo	64	128	2 × 3	51 × 76

=== United Kingdom ===
A common paperback size in the UK is B-format, which is used, for example, by Penguin Classics. This contrasts with A-format, which is slightly narrower than ISO B6, and C-format.

British paperback sizes
Format	mm × mm	inch × inch	Aspect ratio
A	110 × 178	4 3/8 × 7	ϕ∶1
B	129 × 198	5 1/8 × 7 3/4	1.53
C	135 × 216	5 3/8 × 8 1/2	8∶5

Formerly the descriptions octavo, quarto, duodecimo, etc. were used (see table under United States above), and indeed still are when describing older books.

=== Australia ===
Australia uses similar paperback sizes to the UK, except C-format is a bigger size. Additionally there is a B+ format.

Australian paperback sizes
Format	mm × mm	inch × inch
A Format	111 × 181	4 3/8 × 7 1/8
B Format	128 × 198	5 × 7 3/4
B+ Format	135 × 210	5 3/8 × 8 1/4
C Format	153 × 234	6 × 9 1/4

=== Japan ===
In book construction, Japan uses a mixture of ISO A-series, JIS B-series, and several traditional Japanese paper sizes. A- and B-series signatures are folded from a sheet slightly larger than ISO A1 and JIS B1, respectively, then trimmed to size. The most commonly encountered sizes are listed below.

Japanese book formats and corresponding sizes
Name	Translation	Leaves	Pages	Approximate cover size (width × height)		Notes
Name	Translation	Leaves	Pages	mm × mm	inch × inch	Notes
B4判	JIS B4	8	16	257 × 364	10 1/8 × 14 1/3	Folded from B-series standard sheets (B列本判) measuring 765 mm × 1,085 mm (30.1 in × 42.7 in).
A4判	ISO A4	8	16	210 × 297	8 1/4 × 11 17/24	Folded from A-series standard sheets (A列本判) measuring 625 mm × 880 mm (24.6 in × 34.6 in).
AB判	AB	16	32	210 × 257	8 1/4 × 10 1/8	Has the width of ISO A4 and height of JIS B5.
B5判	JIS B5	16	32	182 × 257	7 1/6 × 10 1/8	
菊判	Kiku ("Chrysanthemum")	16	32	150 × 220	5 11/12 × 8 2/3	Folded from sheets (also called "kiku") of 636 mm × 939 mm (25.0 in × 37.0 in).
A5判	ISO A5	16	32	148 × 210	5 5/6 × 8 1/4	
重箱判	Jūbako ("Tiered Box")	20	40	182 × 206	7 1/6 × 8 1/8	Name refers to squarish shape; folded from B-series standard sheets, yielding 8 more pages than JIS B5.
四六判	Shi-Roku ("4 × 6")	32	64	127 × 188	5 × 7 5/12	Name refers to approximate dimensions in sun; folded from sheets of 788 mm × 1,091 mm (31.0 in × 43.0 in). Size used for tankōbon light novels (typically high-fantasy isekai titles).
B6判	JIS B6	32	64	128 × 182	5 1/24 × 7 1/6	Size used for tankōbon manga ("comics"), especially those aimed at seinen and josei audiences.
新書判 / B40判	"Shinsho" ("New Book") / "B40"	40	80	103 × 182	4 1/24 × 7 1/6	Half the size of Jūbako. Folded from B-series standard sheets, yielding 16 more pages than JIS B6. An informal, de facto standard, with some variation in finished sizes between publishers.
小B6判	"Small JIS B6"	32	64	112 × 174	4 5/12 × 6 5/6	Some publishers' "Shinsho" dimensions are closer to this size. (Note: Kadokawa Shoten, on its Tsubasa Bunko catalog, calls this "Shinsho" size variation "B40" rather than "Small B6"; AlphaPolis, on its Kizuna Bunko catalog, uses instead "Bunkobon" to distinguish children's books printed on this size from those printed on "Shi-Roku" (denoted there as "Tankōbon").); Mostly seen in children's books (as well as many shōnen and shōjo manga).
A6判	ISO A6	32	64	105 × 148	4 1/8 × 5 5/6	Size used for bunkobon (small-format paperbacks).
三五判	San-Go ("3 × 5")	40	80	84 × 148	3 7/24 × 5 5/6	Name refers to approximate dimensions in sun; folded from A-series standard sheets, yielding 16 more pages than A6.

== Records ==
=== Largest book ===
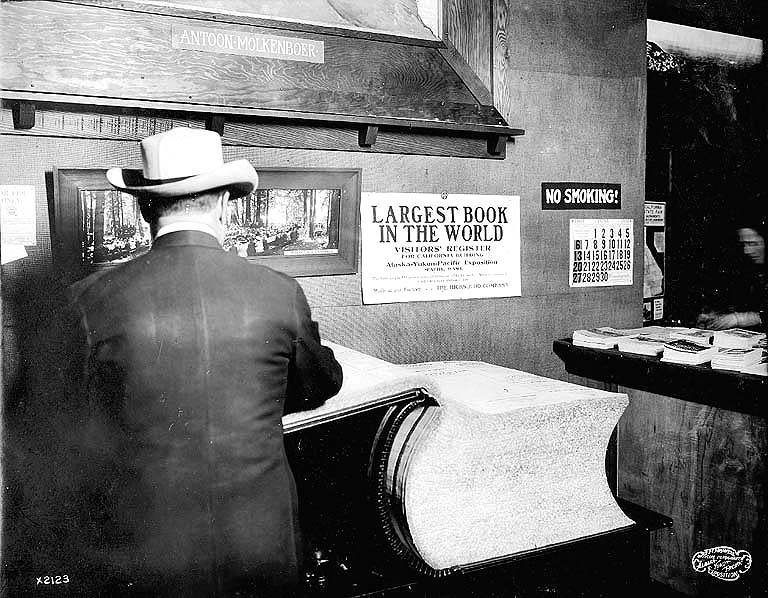
The supposed largest book in the world, as of 1909. It was the visitors' register for the California Building at the Alaska–Yukon–Pacific Exposition in Seattle. Some normal-sized books are on the table at right.

According to the 2003 Guinness World Records, the largest book in the world was Bhutan: A Visual Odyssey Across the Last Himalayan Kingdom by Michael Hawley. Its size is 1.5 m × 2.1 m (5 ft × 7 ft).

According to the 2007 Guinness World Records, the largest published book in the world was The Little Prince printed in Brazil in 2007. Its size is 2.01 m × 3.08 m (6 ft 7 in × 10 ft 1 in).

According to the 2012 Guinness World Records, the largest book in the world was This the Prophet Mohamed made in Dubai, UAE. Its size is 5 m × 8.06 m (16.4 ft × 26.4 ft). Though larger than The Little Prince, the two hold separate records, as This the Prophet Mohamed was not published.

=== Smallest book ===
The smallest book is Teeny Ted from Turnip Town measured 0.07 mm × 0.10 mm (0.0028 in × 0.0039 in). It is a micro-tablet book carved on a pure crystalline silicon page, measuring just 70 micrometres by 100 micrometres. It was etched using an ion beam at the Simon Fraser University, Canada.

=== Largest manuscript ===
The largest surviving medieval manuscript is the Codex Gigas or 'Devil's Manuscript', with dimensions of 920 mm × 500 mm (36 in × 20 in).

== See also ==
- List of booksellers' abbreviations
- Units of paper quantity
