= New Providence School District =

School district in Union County, New Jersey, US

Address
- 356 Elkwood Avenue New Providence, Union County, New Jersey, 07974; United States
- Coordinates: 40.708735°N 74.403537°W

District information
- Grades: PreK-12
- Superintendent: Lauren Zirpoli
- Business administrator: James E. Testa
- Schools: 4

Students and staff
- Enrollment: 2,382 (as of 2022–23)
- Faculty: 189.8 FTEs
- Student–teacher ratio: 12.6:1

Other information
- District Factor Group: I
- Website: www.npsd.k12.nj.us
Ind.	Per pupil	District spending	Rank (*)	K-12 average	%± vs. average
1A	Total Spending	$16,772	21	$18,891	−11.2%
1	Budgetary Cost	13,165	23	14,783	−10.9%
2	Classroom Instruction	7,983	28	8,763	−8.9%
6	Support Services	1,933	25	2,392	−19.2%
8	Administrative Cost	1,550	37	1,485	4.4%
10	Operations & Maintenance	1,221	6	1,783	−31.5%
13	Extracurricular Activities	449	49	268	67.5%
16	Median Teacher Salary	66,376	47	64,043
Data from NJDoE 2014 Taxpayers' Guide to Education Spending. *Of K-12 districts with 1,800-3,500 students. Lowest spending=1; Highest=68

The New Providence School District is a comprehensive community public school district serving students in pre-kindergarten through twelfth grade in New Providence in Union County, in the U.S. state of New Jersey. Students from the unincorporated community of Murray Hill within the borough attend the New Providence school facilities.

As of the 2022–23 school year, the district, comprised of four schools, had an enrollment of 2,382 students and 189.8 classroom teachers (on an FTE basis), for a student–teacher ratio of 12.6:1.

The district is classified by the New Jersey Department of Education as being in District Factor Group "I", the second-highest of eight groupings. District Factor Groups organize districts statewide to allow comparison by common socioeconomic characteristics of the local districts. From lowest socioeconomic status to highest, the categories are A, B, CD, DE, FG, GH, I and J.

== Awards and recognition ==
During the 2007-08 school year, New Providence Middle School was recognized with the National Blue Ribbon School Award of Excellence by the United States Department of Education, the highest award an American school can receive.

The district was selected as one of the top "100 Best Communities for Music Education in America 2005" by the American Music Conference.

The district's high school was the top-ranked public high school in New Jersey out of 328 schools statewide in New Jersey Monthly magazine's September 2012 cover story on the state's "Top Public High Schools", after being ranked 5th in 2010 out of 322 schools listed.

== Schools ==
Schools in the district (with 2022–23 enrollment data from the National Center for Education Statistics) are:

Elementary schools

- Allen W. Roberts Elementary School with 676 students in grades PreK–6
  - Jay Richter, principal
- Salt Brook Elementary School with 607 students in grades K–6
  - Jean M. Drexinger, principal

Middle school

- New Providence Middle School with 398 students in grades 7–8
  - Brian Henry, principal

High school

- New Providence High School with 666 students in grades 9–12
  - Brian Henry, principal

The middle school and high school share the same building and some of the same facilities (art rooms, auditorium, east wing, west wing, gyms, music rooms, TV production room, cafeteria). A construction project add a new gym and classrooms.

== School design ==
Allen W. Roberts School, built in 1962, was created in the style of a California high school; this means that students would have to venture outside in order to switch classes, go to the nurse, use the gym facility, etc. Unfortunately, the area does not have a climate that is ideal for this type of construction; most notably a wet and rainy fall, and occasional severe winters. In the early 1990s, a construction project was undertaken to transform the school from this style to be fully enclosed. Just recently, the open structure that connected the main building to the secondary building was closed with the addition of new classrooms.

== Population and expansion crisis ==
New Providence used to have two other elementary schools, Hillview and Lincoln. Lincoln School was sold to the borough for $1 in 1980; the property was used for a new municipal center. Hillview was being leased to a local child care provider, since student populations in the 1980s and 1990s did not necessitate a third elementary school. In the early 1990s, it was determined that it was no longer necessary to keep this school. Moreover, it was felt that the cost to modernize the school, mostly in HVAC infrastructure and asbestos removal, was too costly and would not be worth the fund allocation. In an effort spearheaded by then Superintendent Geoffrey Gordon, Hillview was sold to private and public interests: the Morris-Union Jointure Commission currently operates there. Right after the Hillview sale, 7th and 8th grade instruction was moved from the elementary schools to the high school, due to rising student populations in the lower grades. During the first few years of this facility merger, the high school population was low enough that they could effectively share facilities but did not have a need to share classrooms. However, school populations readily increased and both the middle and high schools saw the need for extra classrooms. Moreover, during the years of 1997-1998, the school population started to explode at the Kindergarten and first-grade levels, indicating that there would be a future need for expanded facilities.

The district and town recognized the need for expanded facilities. In 1998 the board of education floated bonds to pay for several construction efforts. Four new classrooms were added in 1998. A new television studio and music room was added in 2001. In 2003, a new gym was built and the cafeteria was expanded. These construction projects would not have been necessary if the town had retained its Hillview facility, causing some residents to consider the wisdom of selling the facility in the first place. The critics' main concern is the perceivable lack of long-term considerations. Currently, the owners of Hillview have no desire to sell the facility back to the borough. As of September 27, 2005 a $10 million bond was passed by referendum for additional school construction.

== Administration ==
Core members of the district's administration are:

- Lauren Zirpoli, superintendent
- James E. Testa, business administrator and board secretary

== Board of education ==
The district's board of education, comprised of seven members, sets policy and oversees the fiscal and educational operation of the district through its administration. As a Type II school district, the board's trustees are elected directly by voters to serve three-year terms of office on a staggered basis, with either two or three seats up for election each year held (since 2012) as part of the November general election. The board appoints a superintendent to oversee the district's day-to-day operations and a business administrator to supervise the business functions of the district.
