= Syd Kitson =

American football player (born 1958)

No. 64, 73
- Position: Guard

Personal information
- Born: September 27, 1958 (age 68); Orange, New Jersey, U.S.
- Listed height: 6 ft 4 in (1.93 m)
- Listed weight: 258 lb (117 kg)

Career information
- High school: New Providence (New Providence, New Jersey)
- College: Wake Forest
- NFL draft: 1980: 3rd round, 61st overall pick

Career history
- Green Bay Packers (1980–1984); Dallas Cowboys (1984)

Career NFL statistics
- Games played: 50
- Games started: 12
- Stats at Pro Football Reference

Sydney William Kitson (born September 27, 1958) is an American former professional football player who was a guard in the National Football League (NFL) for the Green Bay Packers and Dallas Cowboys. He played college football at Wake Forest University.

== Early life ==
He attended New Providence High School in New Providence, New Jersey, where he played football on the New Providence Pioneers. He accepted a scholarship from Wake Forest University. In college, he started his career at tight end, before being moved to offensive tackle and eventually to offensive guard.

== Professional career ==
=== Green Bay Packers ===
Kitson was selected by the Green Bay Packers in the third round (61st overall) of the 1980 NFL draft. As a rookie, he was a reserve guard until the tenth game, when he replaced an injured Buddy Aydelette as the team's long snapper.

On October 13, 1981, he was placed on the injured reserve list with a neck injury for five games. In 1982, he was placed on the injured reserve list, after suffering a cracked shoulder, while playing against the Los Angeles Raiders in the preseason.

In 1983, he alternated at left guard with Dave Drechsler for the first 4 games, before being moved to right guard after the 11th game of the season in place of Tim Huffman. He had a reception for 9 yards as an eligible receiver against the Minnesota Vikings.

In 1984, he was benched after the third game, in favor of using a larger Ron Hallstrom at right guard. He was released on October 23 to make room for guard Keith Uecker.

=== Dallas Cowboys ===
On November 27, 1984, he was signed as a free agent by the Dallas Cowboys and only played in one game. He was waived on August 27, 1985 season.

== Personal life ==
From 1986 to 1992, he founded a real estate company that developed and sold residential communities, commercial properties, senior housing units, retail stores and offices.

Kitson is the chairman/CEO and one of the founding partners of Kitson & Partners, a real estate development company. He and his associates planned a new solar-powered city called Babcock Ranch in Southwest Florida. Kitson also serves on the board of directors of the Florida Council of 100 and as the Chair of the Florida Chamber.
