= List of used book conditions =

This is a list of used book conditions. Booksellers use standard terms to describe the condition of the used books that they sell.

== List of used book conditions ==
The set of terms below were proposed in 1949 by AB Bookman's Weekly. They were adopted by the bookselling community and are still in use today.

- As new means that the book is in the state that it should have been in when it left the publisher. This is the equivalent of mint condition in numismatics.
- Fine (F or FN) is "as new" but allowing for the normal effects of time on an unused book that has been protected. A fine book shows no damage.
- Very good (VG) describes a book that is worn but untorn. For many collectors this is the minimum acceptable condition for all but the rarest items. Any defects must be noted.
- Good (G) describes the condition of an average used worn book that is complete. Any defects must be noted.
- Fair shows wear and tear but all the text pages and illustrations or maps are present. It may lack endpapers, half-title, and even the title page. All defects must be noted.
- Poor describes a book that has the complete text but is so damaged that it is only of interest to a buyer who seeks a reading copy. If the damage renders the text illegible then the book is not even poor.
- Ex-library copies must always be designated as such no matter what the condition of the book.
- Book club copies must always be designated as such no matter what the condition of the book.
- Binding copy describes a book in which the pages or leaves are perfect, but the binding is very bad, loose, off, or non-existent.

== Dust jackets ==
- Partially chipped (PC) describes small scuffs that remove the original colour of the dust jacket in discrete small flecks.

In all cases, the lack of a dust jacket is noted if the book was issued with one. The same applies to other possible accessories, such as inlays (like errata lists, cards, photo prints, PCBs), foldouts (like maps), media (like diskettes, CDs, DVDs) etc. There is no standard term for books in a condition below poor. Their normal fate is to be discarded or to be broken into individual pages if these have any value.

== Internet book listings ==
With the advent of the Internet, AB Bookman's Weekly magazine declined and its place was taken by Internet listing services starting with Interloc in 1994. These services, for their own purposes, have made modifications to the descriptions in listings. For example, Amazon adds the terms "acceptable".

== See also ==
- Foxing
- List of booksellers' abbreviations

== Bibliography ==
- Chernofsky, Jacob L., ed. (1991). Bookman's Yearbook 1990–1991. Clifton, NJ: Bookman's Weekly. ISBN 978-9-99-027069-3.
- Hollowell, Hugh. "The Original AB Bookman Grading Scale 1949". Archived from the original on 3 March 2016.
