= List of booksellers' abbreviations =

This is a list of abbreviations commonly used by booksellers.

- ABA: Antiquarian Booksellers' Association
- ABAA: Antiquarian Booksellers' Association of America
- A.e.g.: All edges gilt.
- A.e.s.: All edges stained.
- A.L.s.: Autograph letter, signed.
- ARC: Advance reading copy.
- BCE: Book Club edition.
- Bd.: Bound.
- Bdg.: Binding.
- Bds.: Boards.
- B.e.p.: Back endpaper.
- B.f.e.p.: Back free endpaper.
- B.L.: Blackletter.
- BOMC: Book-of-the-Month Club.
- c. or ca.: Circa; around/about (referring to date)
- C. & p.: Collated and perfect.
- Cf.: Calf.
- Cl.: Cloth.
- CR or CPR or ©: Copyright
- CWO: Check or cash with order.
- Dec.: Decorated.
- D.j.: Dust jacket.
- D.S.: Document signed.
- DW: Dustwrapper (same as dust jacket, or book jacket)
- Ed.: Edition or editor.
- Endp. or e.p.: Endpaper.
- Eng. or engr.: Engraved(ing).
- Ex-lib: Ex-Library copy, a book once held in library. Not to be confused with Ex Libris.
- Ex Libris: From the library of, referring to previous owner—often found on bookplates.
- F: Fine condition.
- Facs.: Facsimile.
- F.e.p.: Front endpaper.
- F.f.e.p.: Front free endpaper.
- FL: Flyleaf
- Frontis. or front. or fp.: Frontispiece.
- G: Good condition.
- G. or gt.: Gilt.
- G.e.: Gilt edges.
- HC/HCV: Hardcover.
- Hf. bd.: Half bound.
- Illus. or ills. or ill.: Illustrated.
- IOBA: Independent Online Booksellers Association
- Litho: Lithograph.
- Ltd. Ed.: Limited Edition.
- M.e.: Marbled edges.
- Mco., mor.: Morocco leather.
- MS(S). Manuscript(s).
- N.d.: No date.
- NF: Near Fine condition.
- N.p.: No place, publisher, or printer.
- N.p.c.: not price clipped (of the jacket).
- NYR or NYP: Not Yet Released or Not Yet Published
- OSI: Out of Stock Indefinitely
- O.p.: Out-of-Print.
- P.b. or p.p.b.: Paperback.
- P.c.: price clipped (of the jacket).
- Pl(s).: Plate(s).
- P.P.: Privately printed.
- pp: Pages; p (and then the number) for page; pp for plural pages.
- PPD: Postpaid.
- Pr.: Printing.
- Pseud.: Pseudonym.
- Pub(d).: Publisher/published.
- REP: Rear endpaper.
- RFEP: Rear free endpaper.
- RET: Returnable
- SLC or SC: Slipcase
- SGD: Signed
- T.e.g.: Top edge gilt.
- T.L.s.: Typed letter, signed.
- T.p.: Title-page.
- TS.: Typescript.
- Vol. or vols.: Volume/volumes.
- VG: Very Good condition.
- W.a.f.: With all faults.

== See also ==
- Book size
- List of used book conditions
