= New Providence, New Jersey =

Borough in Union County, New Jersey, US

- Borough
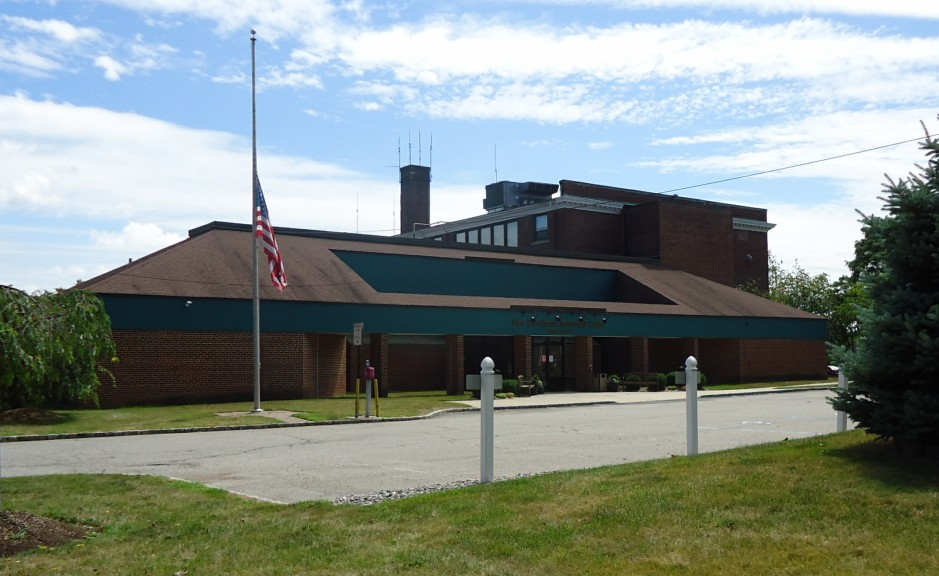
- New Providence Municipal Building

- Seal

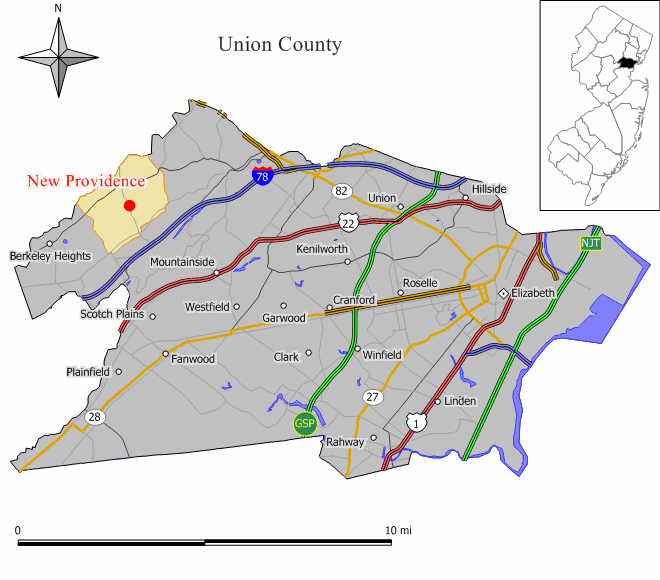
- Location of New Providence in Union County, New Jersey. Inset: Location of Union County in New Jersey.

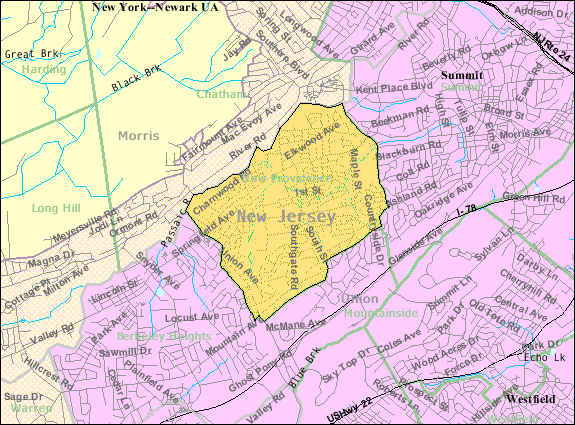
- Census Bureau map of New Providence, New Jersey

- Location in Union County Location in New Jersey Location in the United States
- Coordinates: 40.69889°N 74.406623°W
- Country: United States
- State: New Jersey
- County: Union
- Incorporated: March 14, 1899

Government
  - Type: Borough
  - Body: Borough Council
  - Mayor: Allen B. Morgan (R, term ends December 31, 2026)
  - Administrator: Bernadette C. Cuccaro
  - Municipal clerk: Denise Brinkofski

Area
  - Total: 3.71 sq mi (9.61 km^{2})
  - Land: 3.69 sq mi (9.55 km^{2})
  - Water: 0.019 sq mi (0.05 km^{2}) 0.57%
  - Rank: 307th of 565 in state 14th of 21 in county
- Elevation: 217 ft (66 m)

Population (2020)
  - Total: 13,650
  - Estimate (2023): 13,488
  - Rank: 188th of 565 in state 15th of 21 in county
  - Density: 3,701.2/sq mi (1,429.0/km^{2})
  - Rank: 182nd of 565 in state 16th of 21 in county
- Time zone: UTC−05:00 (Eastern (EST))
  - Summer (DST): UTC−04:00 (Eastern (EDT))
- ZIP Code: 07974
- Area codes: 908 and 973
- FIPS code: 3403951810
- GNIS feature ID: 0885321
- Website: www.newprov.us

New Providence is a borough on the northwestern edge of Union County, in the U.S. state of New Jersey. It is located on the Passaic River, which forms the county boundary with Morris County bordering Chatham Township. As of the 2020 United States census, the borough's population was 13,650, an increase of 1,479 (+12.2%) from the 2010 census count of 12,171, which in turn reflected increase of 264 (+2.2%) from the 11,907 counted in the 2000 census.

The borough is home to much of the Murray Hill neighborhood with the remainder lying in neighboring Berkeley Heights. Service on the NJ Transit is available at the New Providence and Murray Hill stations. More than 9% of New Providence's land is publicly-owned and protected parkland.

== History ==
The written history of New Providence begins in 1664 when James, Duke of York and brother to King Charles II, purchased the land that became known as the Elizabethtown Tract from the Lenape Native Americans. Its first European settlers were members of a Puritan colony established in 1720, which was the first permanent settlement of its type. The settlement was originally called "Turkey" or "Turkey Town", due to the presence of wild turkeys in the area.

The Presbyterian Church established in 1737 was a focal point for the community, and the lack of serious injuries when the church's balcony collapsed in 1759 was deemed to be an example of divine intervention, leading residents to change the area's name to New Providence.

According to local tradition, George Washington spent the night in a local home, which still stands to this day. Supposedly, the local stream, Salt Brook, is named for an incident when the salt supply of the colonial village was dumped into the brook to prevent passing British soldiers from taking it. Ironically, the British Army never crossed the Watchung Mountains into this region. Salt Brook winds through town, starting near the eponymous Salt Brook Elementary School.

On April 14, 1794, Springfield Township was formed, which included the present-day township, along with the towns of Summit, New Providence, and Berkeley Heights. Growth continued in the area, and on November 8, 1809, New Providence Township was formed from within Springfield Township. It included what is now Summit, New Providence, and Berkeley Heights. On March 23, 1869, Summit withdrew from the New Providence Township and reincorporated as a township without any other town.

On March 14, 1899, New Providence also withdrew from New Providence Township and was reincorporated as a borough. With Boroughitis sweeping across the state, many communities within townships were reverting to small, locally governed communities (mostly reincorporating as boroughs) due to acts of the New Jersey Legislature that made it economically advantageous for communities so do so. New Providence Township was renamed to Berkeley Heights as of November 6, 1951.

The cultivation of roses played an important role in the local economy in the 1900s.

New Providence had long been a semi-dry town, under which there were no bars and no restaurants permitted to sell alcoholic beverages. Retail liquor sales were legal and restaurant-goers may bring their own alcoholic beverages. In 2011, the borough announced that it was considering issuing on-premises liquor licenses, which could bring in as much as $500,000 for each bar granted a license, with plans to use the money raised to pay for improvements to recreation areas. Liquor licenses were granted in 2015 to a pair of restaurants, ending a 100-year period in which the borough had no on-premises liquor licenses.

The 2011 film Win Win is set at New Providence High School, having been written by Tom McCarthy and Joe Tiboni, two former students at the school.

=== Landmarks ===
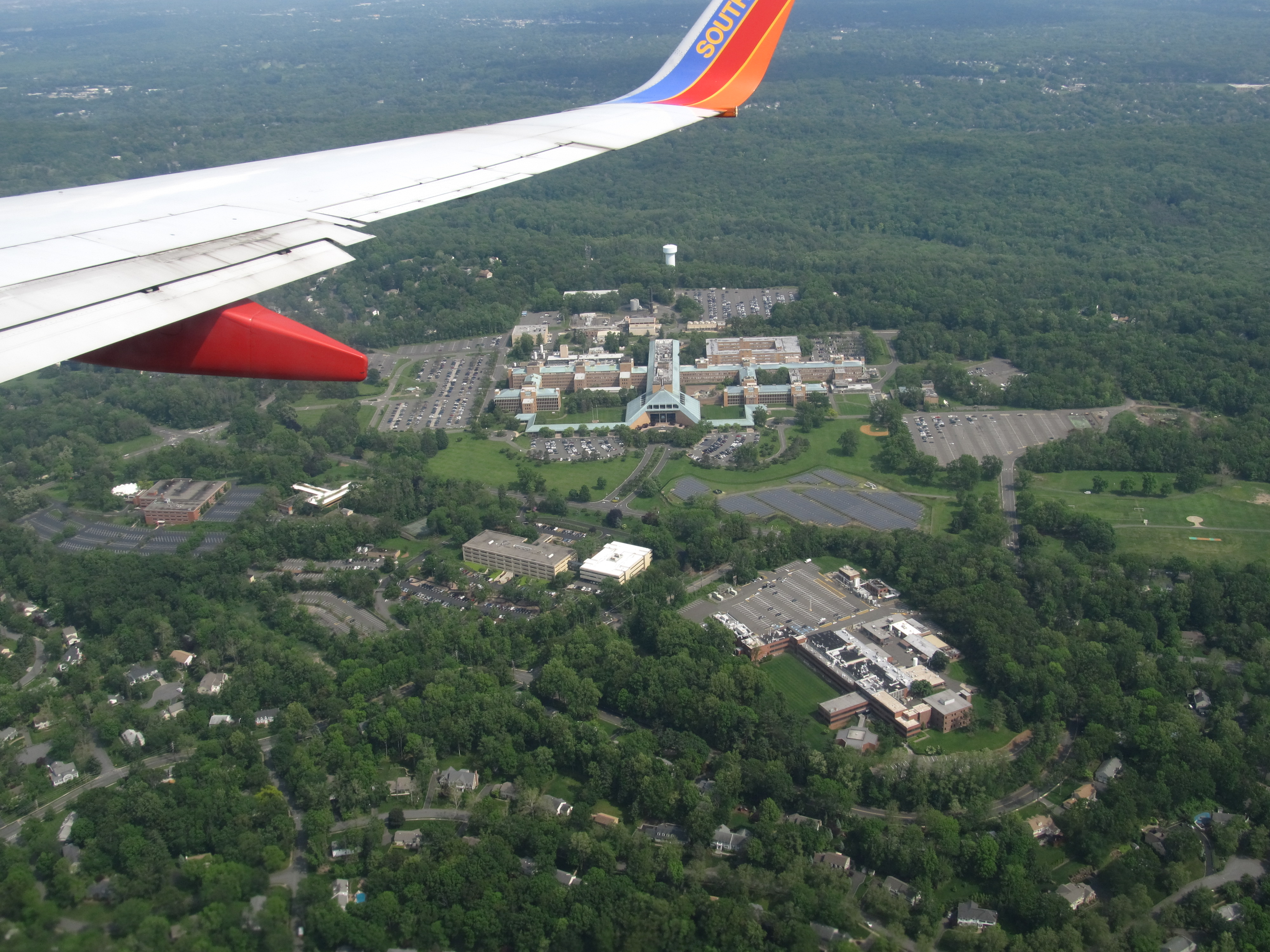
Bell Laboratories, New Providence

- Nokia Bell Labs, formerly known as Bell Telephone Laboratories, is located in the New Providence neighborhood of Murray Hill. Researchers at this facility were credited with the development of radio astronomy, the transistor, the laser, the photovoltaic cell and other advances in technology. Nine Nobel Prizes have been awarded for work completed at this facility.
- The Presbyterian Church is a large, white, historic church in the center of town.
- The Village Shopping Center is a shopping center that takes up the majority of downtown New Providence.
- New Providence School District currently links together the computer networks of its buildings by using a wireless LAN which includes Yagi antennas at two towers by the large copper pyramid-shaped roof.
- Our Lady of Peace is a Roman Catholic church and school located on South Street. The parking lot at OLP becomes the home of the town's OLP fair, held for three days each spring, complete with rides, games, food, and an indoor auction/junk fest.
- The Salt Box Museum, located at 1350 Springfield Avenue, is an 18th-century farmhouse owned by the New Providence Historical Society.

== Geography ==
According to the United States Census Bureau, New Providence borough had a total area of 3.71 square miles (9.61 km^{2}), including 3.69 square miles (9.55 km^{2}) of land and 0.02 square miles (0.05 km^{2}) of water (0.57%).

New Providence is bordered by Berkeley Heights to the southwest and south, and by Summit to the east in Union County; and to the north by Chatham Township, across the Passaic River, in Morris County.

Much of the Murray Hill neighborhood lies in New Providence, with the remainder in Berkeley Heights; Other unincorporated communities, localities and place names within the borough include Tall Oaks, Johnsons Bridge, and West Summit.

The borough lies on the western slope of Second Watchung Mountain. There are several creek beds carved into the landscape, most of which are forks and branches of Salt Brook. These creeks join near the center of town then flow into the Passaic River, along the banks of which Passaic River Parkway is found. Over nine percent of New Providence's land area is permanently protected, publicly owned parkland. Most of this land is wooded floodplain adjacent to the Passaic. Union County owns much of the riverfront parkland and New Providence owns the remainder. There are several borough-owned parks that bracket Salt Brook, including Veterans Memorial Park on South Street, Lions Park on Livingston Avenue, and Clearwater Park near the end of Central Avenue.

== Demographics ==
Historical population
Census	Pop.	Note	%±
1900	565		—
1910	873		54.5%
1920	1,203		37.8%
1930	1,918		59.4%
1940	2,374		23.8%
1950	3,380		42.4%
1960	10,243		203.0%
1970	13,796		34.7%
1980	12,426		−9.9%
1990	11,439		−7.9%
2000	11,907		4.1%
2010	12,171		2.2%
2020	13,650		12.2%
2023 (est.)	13,488	▼	−1.2%
Population sources: 1900–1920; 1900–1910 1910–1930; 1940–2000 2000; 2010 2020

=== Racial and ethnic composition ===
New Providence borough, New Jersey – Racial and ethnic composition Note: the US Census treats Hispanic/Latino as an ethnic category. This table excludes Latinos from the racial categories and assigns them to a separate category. Hispanics/Latinos may be of any race.
Race / Ethnicity (NH = Non-Hispanic)	Pop 2000	Pop 2010	Pop 2020	% 2000	% 2010	% 2020
White alone (NH)	10,359	9,870	9,429	87.00%	81.09%	69.08%
Black or African American alone (NH)	104	153	241	1.00%	1.26%	1.77%
Native American or Alaska Native alone (NH)	3	9	7	0.03%	0.07%	0.05%
Asian alone (NH)	903	1,187	2,171	8.72%	9.75%	15.90%
Native Hawaiian or Pacific Islander alone (NH)	3	0	2	0.03%	0.00%	0.01%
Other race alone (NH)	10	19	60	0.10%	0.16%	0.44%
Mixed race or Multiracial (NH)	108	150	489	1.04%	1.23%	3.58%
Hispanic or Latino (any race)	417	783	1,251	4.03%	6.43%	9.16%
Total	11,907	12,171	13,650	100.00%	100.00%	100.00%

=== 2020 census ===
As of the 2020 census, New Providence had a population of 13,650. The median age was 42.8 years. 25.2% of residents were under the age of 18 and 17.9% of residents were 65 years of age or older. For every 100 females, there were 93.1 males, and for every 100 females age 18 and over, there were 89.3 males.

100.0% of residents lived in urban areas, while 0.0% lived in rural areas.

There were 5,071 households in New Providence, of which 38.0% had children under the age of 18 living in them. Of all households, 62.2% were married-couple households, 12.9% were households with a male householder and no spouse or partner present, and 22.4% were households with a female householder and no spouse or partner present. About 24.7% of all households were made up of individuals and 14.7% had someone living alone who was 65 years of age or older.

There were 5,497 housing units, of which 7.7% were vacant. The homeowner vacancy rate was 4.9% and the rental vacancy rate was 10.4%.

=== 2010 census ===
The 2010 United States census counted 12,171 people, 4,408 households, and 3,337 families in the borough. The population density was 3,343.4 per square mile (1,290.9/km^{2}). There were 4,537 housing units at an average density of 1,246.3 per square mile (481.2/km^{2}). The racial makeup was 85.98% (10,465) White, 1.27% (155) Black or African American, 0.10% (12) Native American, 9.78% (1,190) Asian, 0.04% (5) Pacific Islander, 1.22% (148) from other races, and 1.61% (196) from two or more races. Hispanic or Latino of any race were 6.43% (783) of the population.

Of the 4,408 households, 39.2% had children under the age of 18; 66.2% were married couples living together; 7.2% had a female householder with no husband present and 24.3% were non-families. Of all households, 20.8% were made up of individuals and 8.5% had someone living alone who was 65 years of age or older. The average household size was 2.73 and the average family size was 3.20.

27.3% of the population were under the age of 18, 4.9% from 18 to 24, 24.3% from 25 to 44, 29.6% from 45 to 64, and 13.9% who were 65 years of age or older. The median age was 41.0 years. For every 100 females, the population had 94.8 males. For every 100 females ages 18 and older there were 91.4 males.

The Census Bureau's 2006–2010 American Community Survey showed that (in 2010 inflation-adjusted dollars) median household income was $113,542 (with a margin of error of +/− $12,769) and the median family income was $144,837 (+/− $13,137). Males had a median income of $103,237 (+/− $7,256) versus $60,029 (+/− $10,693) for females. The per capita income for the borough was $53,564 (+/− $3,739). About 3.2% of families and 4.5% of the population were below the poverty line, including 7.1% of those under age 18 and 0.9% of those age 65 or over.

=== 2000 census ===
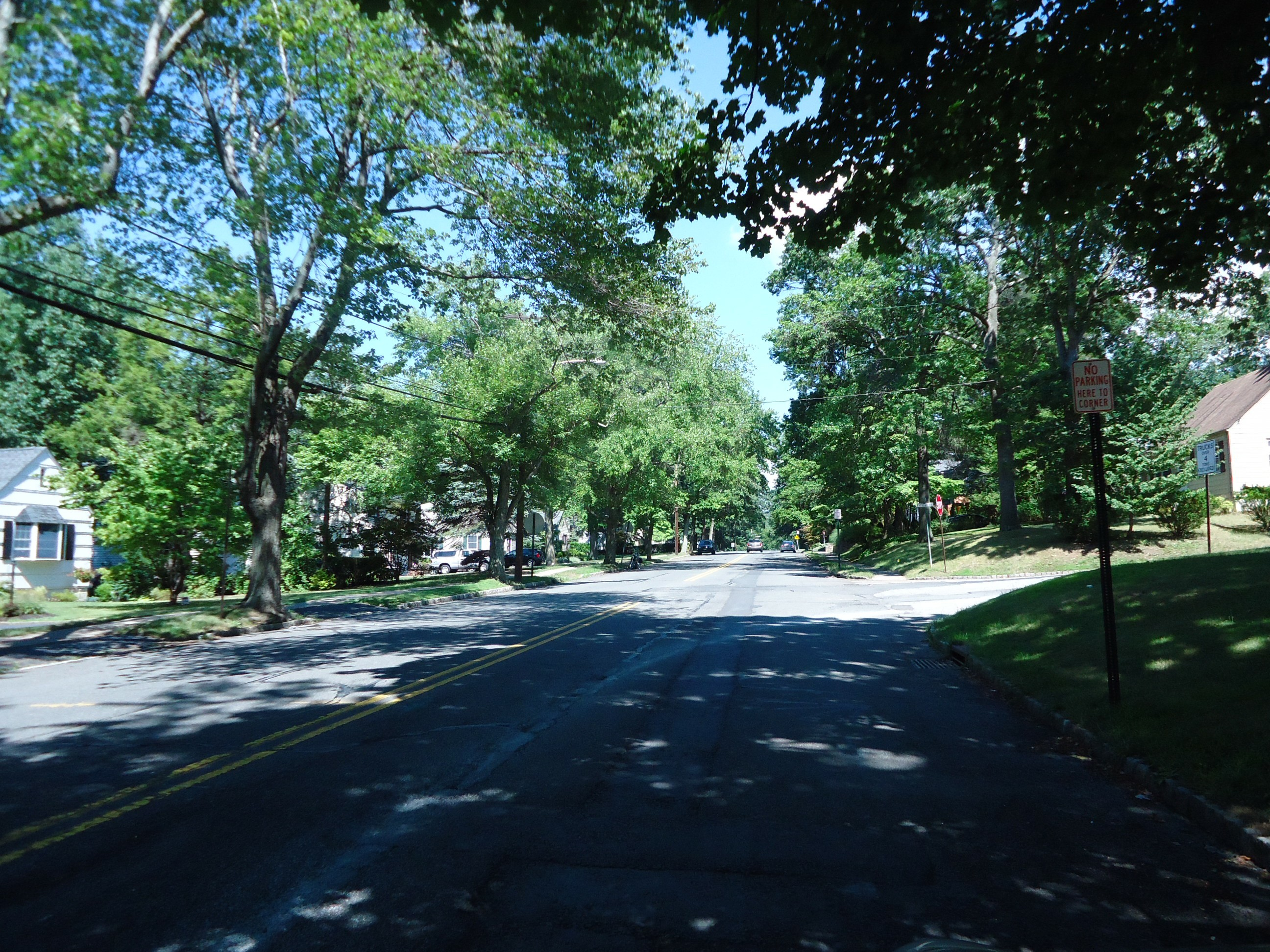
A residential street

As of the 2000 United States census there were 11,907 people, 4,404 households, and 3,307 families residing in New Providence. The population density was 3,236.9 inhabitants per square mile (1,249.8/km^{2}). There were 4,485 housing units at an average density of 1,219.2 per square mile (470.7/km^{2}). The racial makeup of the borough was 89.77% White, 0.88% African American, 0.03% Native American, 7.60% Asian, 0.03% Pacific Islander, 0.68% from other races, and 1.01% from two or more races. Hispanic or Latino of any race were 3.50% of the population.

There were 4,404 households, out of which 37.9% had children under the age of 18 living with them, 66.3% were married couples living together, 6.3% had a female householder with no husband present, and 24.9% were non-families. 21.4% of all households were made up of individuals, and 9.7% had someone living alone who was 65 years of age or older. The average household size was 2.67 and the average family size was 3.13.

In New Providence the population was spread out, with 26.3% under the age of 18, 4.0% from 18 to 24, 31.0% from 25 to 44, 23.3% from 45 to 64, and 15.3% who were 65 years of age or older. The median age was 39 years. For every 100 females, there were 94.0 males. For every 100 females age 18 and over, there were 90.3 males.

The median income for a household in the borough was $90,964, and the median income for a family was $105,013. Males had a median income of $72,926 versus $46,948 for females. The per capita income for the borough was $42,995. About 1.3% of families and 1.8% of the population were below the poverty line, including 1.0% of those under age 18 and 2.0% of those age 65 or over.

== Government ==
=== Local government ===
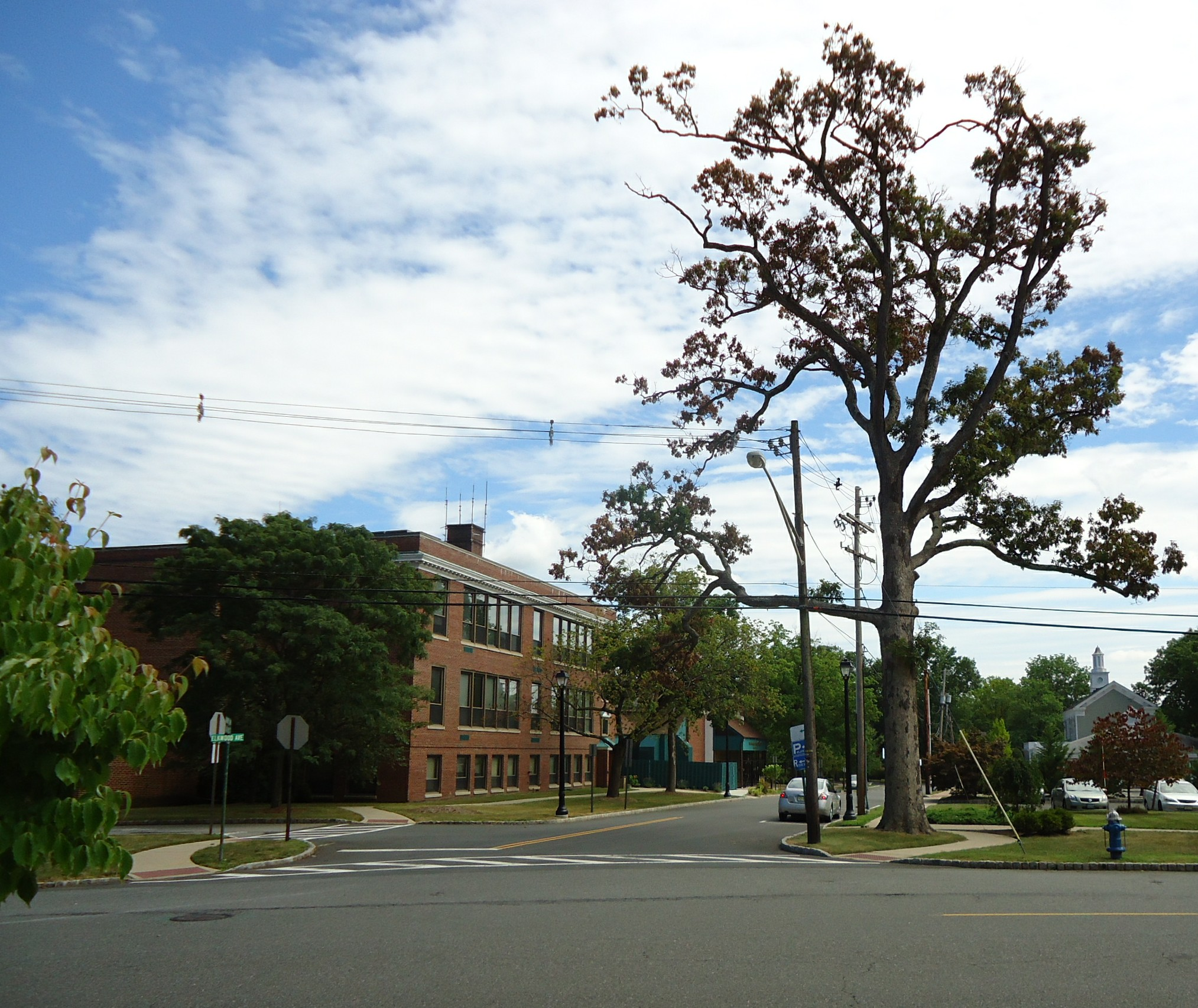
Municipal building

New Providence is governed under the borough form of New Jersey municipal government, which is used in 218 municipalities (of the 564) statewide, making it the most common form of government in New Jersey. The governing body is comprised of the mayor and the borough council, with all positions elected at-large on a partisan basis as part of the November general election. The mayor is elected directly by the voters to a four-year term of office. The borough council includes six members elected to serve three-year terms on a staggered basis, with two seats coming up for election each year in a three-year cycle. The borough form of government used by New Providence is a "weak mayor / strong council" government in which council members act as the legislative body with the mayor presiding at meetings and voting only in the event of a tie. The mayor can veto ordinances subject to an override by a two-thirds majority vote of the council. The mayor makes committee and liaison assignments for council members, and most appointments are made by the mayor with the advice and consent of the council.

As of 2026, the mayor of New Providence is Republican Allen B. Morgan, whose term of office ends December 31, 2026. Members of the New Providence Borough Council are Council President Nadine Geoffroy (R, 2026), Matthew E. Cumiskey (R, 2027), Kathleen Dolan (D, 2027), Brian Gardner (D, 2028), Alan Lerner (D, 2028), and Lisa McKnight (R, 2026).

=== List of mayors ===
Mayor	Term begins	Term ends	Notes
John W. Oakwood	1933	1946	Republican, served seven terms. Oakwood Drive and Oakwood Park in New Providence are named after Mayor Oakwood.
Ellsworth R. Hansell	1947	1952	Republican, served three terms.
Robert Badgley	1953	1954	Republican, served one term. Badgley Drive in New Providence is named after the Badgley family.
Charles Johnson	1955	1956	Republican, served one term.
Francis R. Farley	1963	1966	Democrat. In the 1962 election, Farley and Republican John C. Clay tie at 1,707 votes each. The recount goes to the New Jersey Superior Court. Farley is declared winner in February 1963. Farley is the most recent Democrat Mayor in New Providence.
Edward Bien	1967	1978	Republican, served four terms totaling 12 years. The first two terms (1967-1970) were under the old form of the Borough system of local government where mayors were elected to two-year terms. All regular elections after 1970 for mayor were for four-year terms.
Harold Weideli, Jr.	1978	1998	Republican, served as mayor for five terms.
Allen B. Morgan	1999	2006	Republican, Morgan served as mayor for two terms between 1999 and 2006, when he initially announced his bid for re-election, and then withdrew from the campaign.
John Thoms	2007	2010	Republican, Served as mayor for one term. Was denied the town's GOP endorsement for re-election in 2010, which instead went to Morgan, who went on to lose the primary to J. Brooke Hern. Thoms launched an unsuccessful bid for re-election as an independent, losing to Hern in the general election by a 2-1 margin.
J. Brooke Hern	2011	2014	Republican, upset Morgan in the primary, served one term and chose not to seek re-election after serving 10 years in elected office.
Allen B. Morgan	2015	Incumbent	Republican, re-elected following Hern's decision to not seek a second term. In 2022 he won re-election to a third consecutive. Morgan won 3,000 votes to the Democrat's 2,643.

=== Federal, state, and county representation ===
New Providence is located in the 7th Congressional District and is part of New Jersey's 21st state legislative district.

For the 119th United States Congress, New Jersey's 7th congressional district is represented by Thomas Kean Jr. (R, Westfield). New Jersey is represented in the United States Senate by Democrats Cory Booker (Newark, term ends 2027) and Andy Kim (Moorestown, term ends 2031).

For the 2026–2027 session, the 21st legislative district of the New Jersey Legislature is represented in the State Senate by Jon Bramnick (R, Westfield) and in the General Assembly by Vincent Kearney (D, Garwood) and Andrew Macurdy (D, Summit).

Union County is governed by a Board of County Commissioners, whose nine members are elected at-large to three-year terms of office on a staggered basis with three seats coming up for election each year, with an appointed County Manager overseeing the day-to-day operations of the county. At an annual reorganization meeting held in the beginning of January, the board selects a Chair and Vice Chair from among its members. As of 2026, Union County's County Commissioners are:

Vice Chair Rebecca Williams (D, Plainfield, 2028), Chairman Joesph Bodek (D, Linden, 2026), James E. Baker Jr. (D, Rahway, 2027), Michele Delisfort (D, Union Township, 2026), Lourdes M. Leon (D, Elizabeth, 2026), Alexander Mirabella (D, Fanwood, 2027) Kimberly Palmieri-Mouded (D, Westfield, 2027). Stanley J. Neron (D, Elizabeth, 2028), Joseph Signorello III (D, Roselle Park, 2028)

Constitutional officers elected on a countywide basis are: Clerk Vacant - Incumbent Clerk Joanne Rajoppi (D, Union Township) died on July 16, 2026. Her death triggered a special election for a full five-year term to be held concurrently with the November 2026 general election. Deputy Clerk Clara Fernández assumes the powers of the office until the vacancy is filled. Sheriff Peter Corvelli (D, Kenilworth, 2026) and Surrogate Christopher E. Hudak (D, Clark, 2027).

=== Politics ===
As of September 16, 2022, there were a total of 9,997 registered voters in New Providence, of which 3,190 (31.9% vs. 48% countywide) were registered as Democrats, 2,852 (28.5% vs. 15.98%) were registered as Republicans and 3,889 (38.9% vs. 34.78%) were registered as Unaffiliated. There were 66 voters registered to other parties, such as Libertarians or Greens. Among the borough's 2010 Census population, 82.3% (vs. 53.3% in Union County) were registered to vote, including 89.5% of those ages 18 and over (vs. 70.6% countywide).

United States presidential election results for New Providence
Year	Republican		Democratic		Third party(ies)	
Year	No.	%	No.	%	No.	%
2024	2,880	39.28%	4,312	58.81%	140	1.91%
2020	2,907	38.00%	4,624	60.45%	118	1.54%
2016	2,731	41.87%	3,500	53.66%	292	4.48%
2012	3,267	53.90%	2,726	44.98%	68	1.12%
2008	3,367	53.07%	2,914	45.93%	64	1.01%
2004	3,443	55.81%	2,674	43.35%	52	0.84%

In the 2016 presidential election, Democrat Hillary Clinton received 3,084 votes, ahead of Republican Donald Trump who had 2,517 votes, with others getting 261 votes; this is the first time in recent years that a Democrat carried New Providence in the past four elections. In the 2012 presidential election, Republican Mitt Romney received 3,267 votes (53.7% vs. 32.3% countywide), ahead of Democrat Barack Obama with 2,726 votes (44.8% vs. 66.0%) and other candidates with 68 votes (1.1% vs. 0.8%), among the 6,080 ballots cast by the borough's 8,493 registered voters, for a turnout of 71.6% (vs. 68.8% in Union County). In the 2008 presidential election, Republican John McCain received 3,367 votes (52.8% vs. 35.2% countywide), ahead of Democrat Barack Obama with 2,914 votes (45.7% vs. 63.1%) and other candidates with 64 votes (1.0% vs. 0.9%), among the 6,372 ballots cast by the borough's 8,086 registered voters, for a turnout of 78.8% (vs. 74.7% in Union County). In the 2004 presidential election, Republican George W. Bush received 3,443 votes (55.5% vs. 40.3% countywide), ahead of Democrat John Kerry with 2,674 votes (43.1% vs. 58.3%) and other candidates with 52 votes (0.8% vs. 0.7%), among the 6,202 ballots cast by the borough's 7,801 registered voters, for a turnout of 79.5% (vs. 72.3% in the whole county).

Gubernatorial election results for New Providence
Year	Republican		Democratic		Third party(ies)	
Year	No.	%	No.	%	No.	%
2025	2,528	40.97%	3,614	58.57%	28	0.45%
2021	2,230	46.67%	2,509	52.51%	39	0.82%
2017	1,968	49.00%	1,937	48.23%	111	2.76%
2013	2,468	71.27%	935	27.00%	60	1.73%
2009	2,559	59.04%	1,361	31.40%	414	9.55%
2005	2,283	56.58%	1,663	41.21%	89	2.21%

In the 2017 gubernatorial election, Republican Kim Guadagno received 1,968 votes (49.0% vs. 32.6% countywide), ahead of Democrat Phil Murphy with 1,937 votes (48.2% vs. 65.2%), and other candidates with 111 votes (2.8% vs. 2.1%), among the 4,131 ballots cast by the borough's 8,823 registered voters, for a turnout of 46.8%. In the 2013 gubernatorial election, Republican Chris Christie received 71.3% of the vote (2,468 cast), ahead of Democrat Barbara Buono with 27.0% (935 votes), and other candidates with 1.7% (60 votes), among the 3,516 ballots cast by the borough's 8,298 registered voters (53 ballots were spoiled), for a turnout of 42.4%. In the 2009 gubernatorial election, Republican Chris Christie received 2,559 votes (58.8% vs. 41.7% countywide), ahead of Democrat Jon Corzine with 1,361 votes (31.3% vs. 50.6%), Independent Chris Daggett with 393 votes (9.0% vs. 5.9%) and other candidates with 21 votes (0.5% vs. 0.8%), among the 4,351 ballots cast by the borough's 7,961 registered voters, yielding a 54.7% turnout (vs. 46.5% in the county).

United States Senate election results for New Providence1
Year	Republican		Democratic		Third party(ies)	
Year	No.	%	No.	%	No.	%
2024	3,028	42.40%	4,010	56.15%	104	1.46%
2018	2,554	50.50%	2,294	45.36%	209	4.13%
2012	2,990	53.69%	2,467	44.30%	112	2.01%
2006	2,612	58.58%	1,776	39.83%	71	1.59%

United States Senate election results for New Providence2
Year	Republican		Democratic		Third party(ies)	
Year	No.	%	No.	%	No.	%
2020	3,205	42.34%	4,296	56.75%	69	0.91%
2014	1,584	53.95%	1,286	43.80%	66	2.25%
2013	1,356	53.81%	1,151	45.67%	13	0.52%
2008	3,328	57.70%	2,352	40.78%	88	1.53%

== Education ==
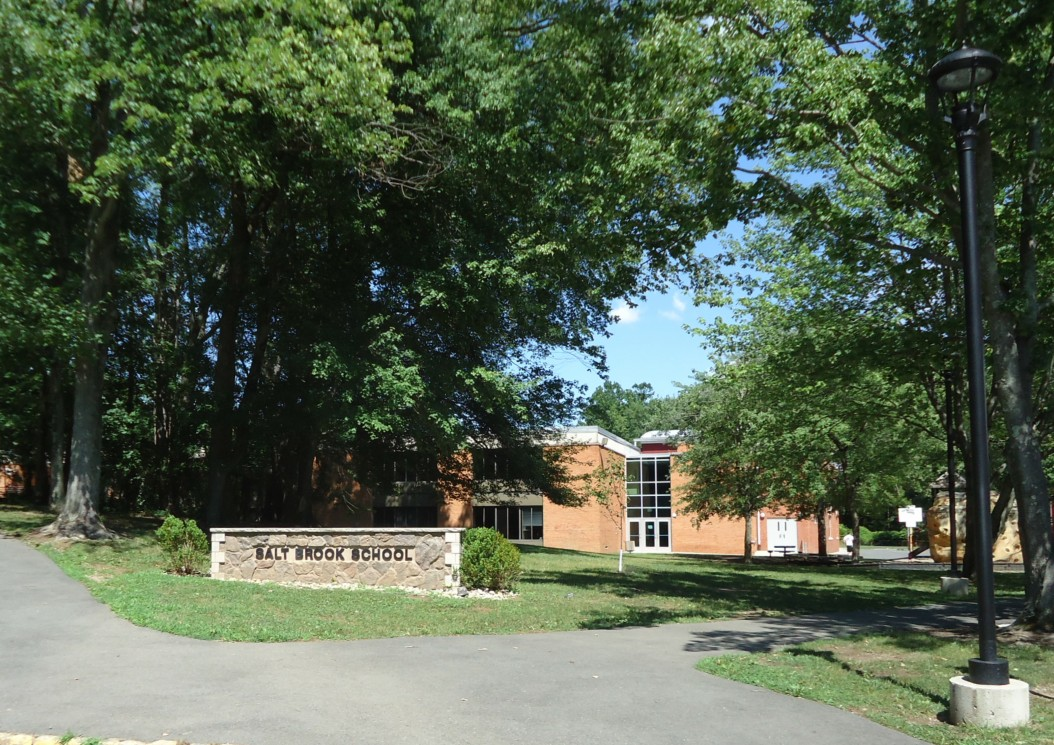
Salt Brook Elementary School

The New Providence School District serves students in public school for pre-kindergarten through twelfth grade. As of the 2022–23 school year, the district, comprised of four schools, had an enrollment of 2,382 students and 189.8 classroom teachers (on an FTE basis), for a student–teacher ratio of 12.6:1. Schools in the district (with 2022–23 enrollment data from the National Center for Education Statistics) are Allen W. Roberts Elementary School with 676 students in grades PreK–6, Salt Brook Elementary School with 607 students in grades K–6, New Providence Middle School with 398 students in grades 7–8 and New Providence High School with 666 students in grades 9–12. The middle school and high school share a common building and some of the same facilities (art rooms, auditorium, east wing, west wing, gyms, music rooms, TV production room, cafeteria).

During the 2007–08 school year, New Providence Middle School was recognized with the National Blue Ribbon School Award of Excellence by the United States Department of Education, the highest award an American school can receive. The district's high school was the top-ranked public high school in New Jersey out of 328 schools statewide in New Jersey Monthly magazine's September 2012 cover story on the state's "Top Public High Schools", after being ranked 5th in 2010 out of 322 schools listed.

Serving students in Pre-K–3 through Grade 8, The Academy of Our Lady of Peace is accredited by the Middle States Association of Colleges and Schools and operates under the auspices of the Roman Catholic Archdiocese of Newark. The school was one of eight private schools recognized in 2017 by the National Blue Ribbon Schools Program as an Exemplary High Performing School by the United States Department of Education.

== Transportation ==
=== Roads and highways ===
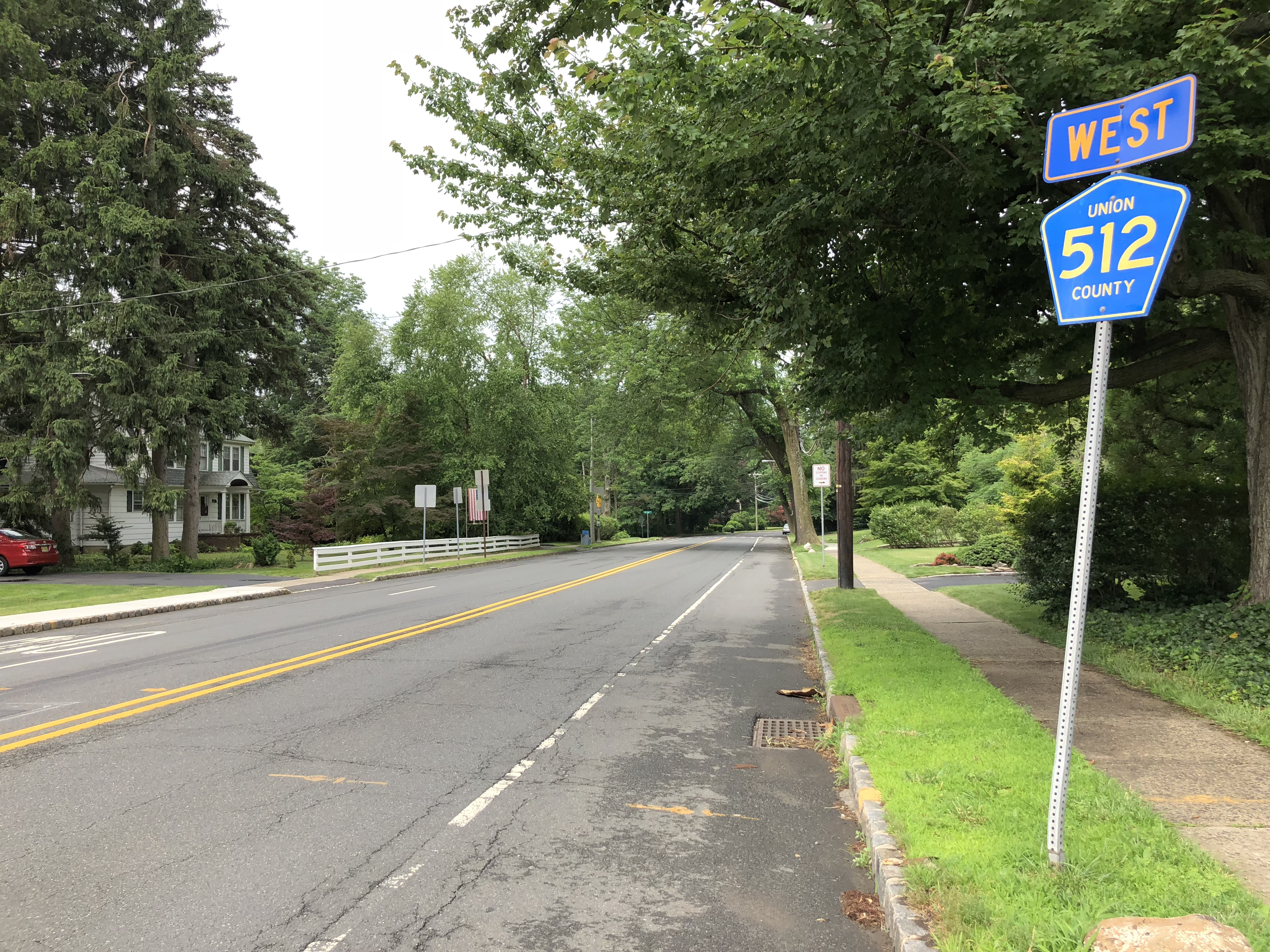
CR 512 in New Providence

As of May 2010, the borough had a total of 50.88 miles (81.88 km) of roadways, of which 44.58 miles (71.74 km) were maintained by the municipality and 6.30 miles (10.14 km) by Union County.

No state, U.S. or Interstate highways directly serve New Providence. The most prominent road through the borough is County Route 512 known as Springfield Avenue.

=== Public transportation ===
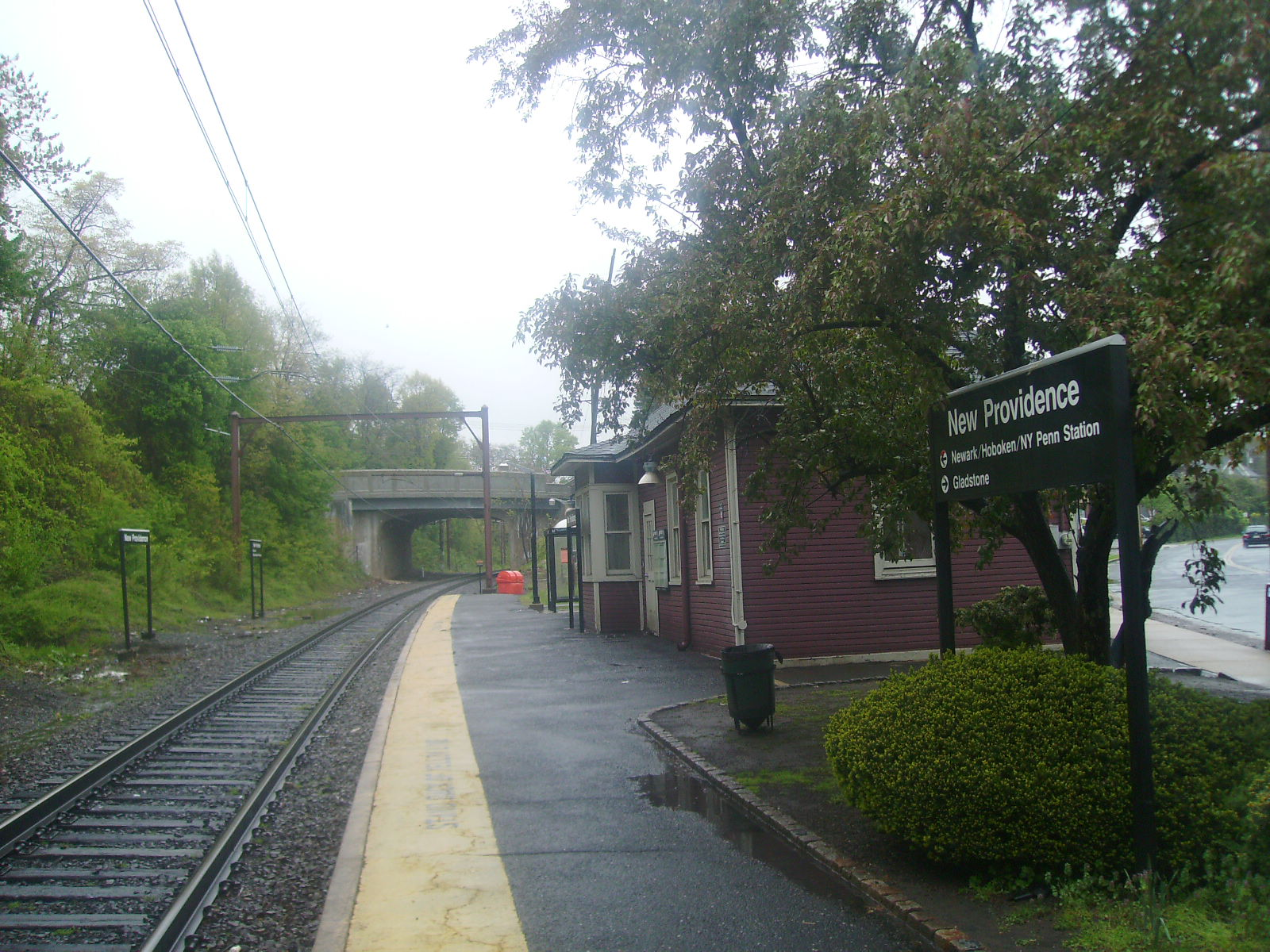
Commuter train station

Service on the NJ Transit Gladstone Branch of the Morris & Essex Lines is available at the New Providence station and Murray Hill station, offering service to Hoboken Terminal and to Penn Station in Midtown Manhattan. Two Gladstone Branch trains each weekday morning offer one-seat rides to Manhattan, and two evening trains leave New York and stop at both of New Providence's stations on the way to Gladstone. All other rail service is to or from Hoboken. These trains connect at Summit or Newark Broad Street with Manhattan-bound trains.

New Jersey Transit offer local bus service on the 986 route.

Lakeland Bus Lines offers weekday rush hour service from stops along Springfield Avenue to New York's Port Authority Bus Terminal.

Newark Liberty International Airport is approximately 16 miles (26 km) east of New Providence.

== Economy ==
Companies based in New Providence include the publishers Martindale-Hubbell and R. R. Bowker.

== Community activities ==
People and local businesses in New Providence are active in organizing community activities.

In 2017, a first annual Carved Pumpkin Contest was organized. In 2016 and 2017, Scarecrow Contest was organized.

== Notable people ==
People who were born in, residents of, or otherwise closely associated with New Providence include:

- Andrew Fastow (born 1961), convicted CFO of Enron, went to NPHS and grew up in New Providence on the same street as the Allen W. Roberts Elementary School
- Mike Ferguson (born 1970), politician who served as member of the United States House of Representatives from New Jersey's 7th congressional district from 2001 to 2009
- Jeff Grob, drummer of the 1970s rock band Looking Glass, was born and raised in New Providence and is a current resident
- Michael Hawley (1961–2020), academic and artist working in the field of digital media
- Carroll N. Jones III (1944–2017), artist in the style of American realism
- Syd Kitson (born 1958), former professional American football guard who played in the NFL for the Green Bay Packers and the Dallas Cowboys
- Andrew Lewis (born 1974), professional soccer player for the MetroStars and the Chicago Fire
- Tom McCarthy (born 1966), actor in Meet the Parents, Good Night, and Good Luck who was director of the indie film The Station Agent He won the Academy Award for Best Original Screenplay co-writing Up (2009) and then again writing Spotlight (2015) which also won the Academy Award for Best Picture.
- Elias Riggs (1810–1901), Presbyterian missionary known for his work in the Ottoman Empire
- Scott Rivkees (born 1956), Surgeon General of Florida from June 2019 to September 2021
- Rat Skates (born 1961 as Lee Kundrat), filmmaker, writer and musician most notable for being a founding member and the original drummer of the thrash metal band, Overkill
- D. D. Verni (born 1961), bass player and founding member of the thrash metal band, Overkill
- Gideon A. Weed (1833–1905), physician who served two terms as mayor of Seattle, Washington

== Gallery ==
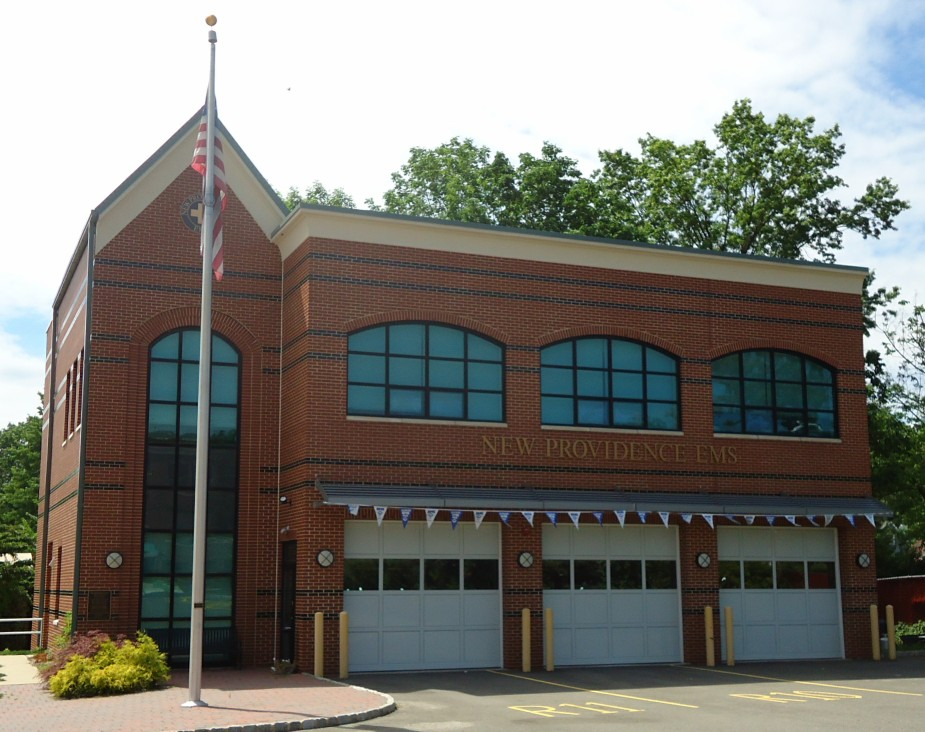
New Providence Volunteer EMS building

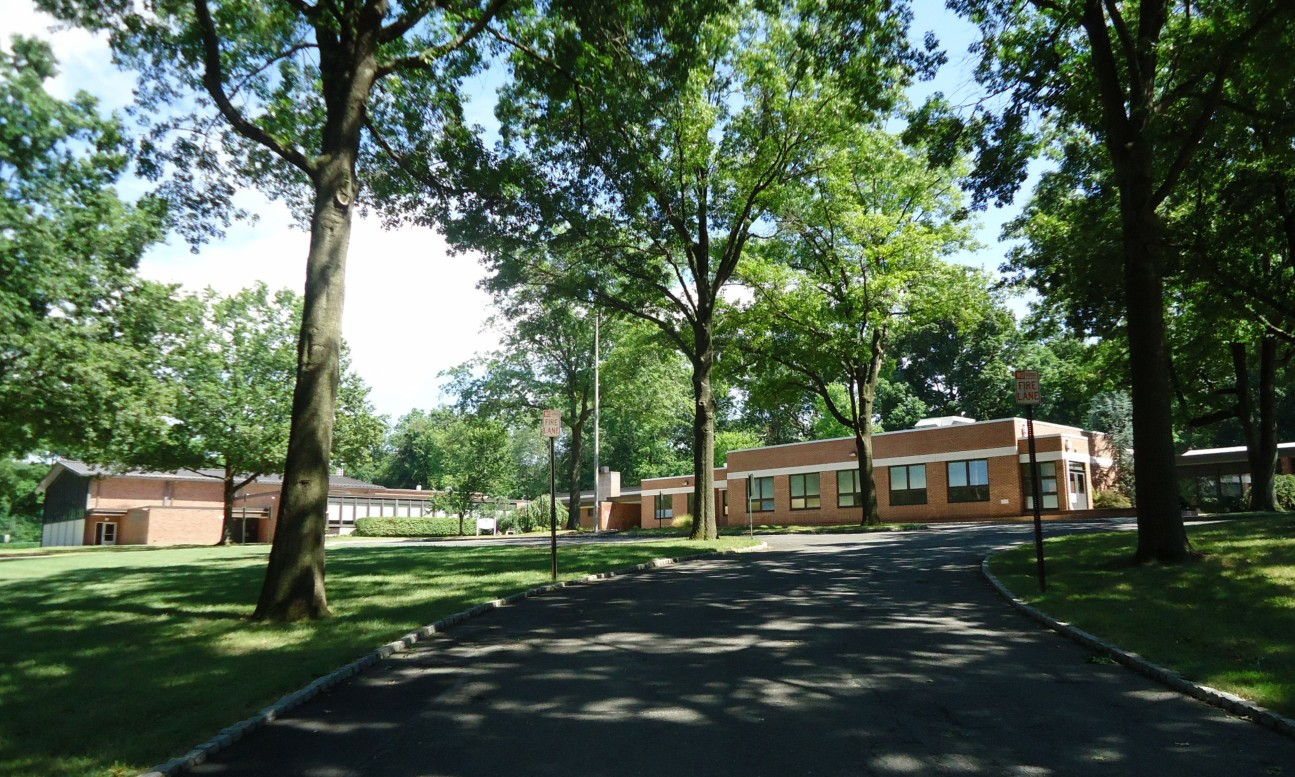
The Morris Union Jointure Commission

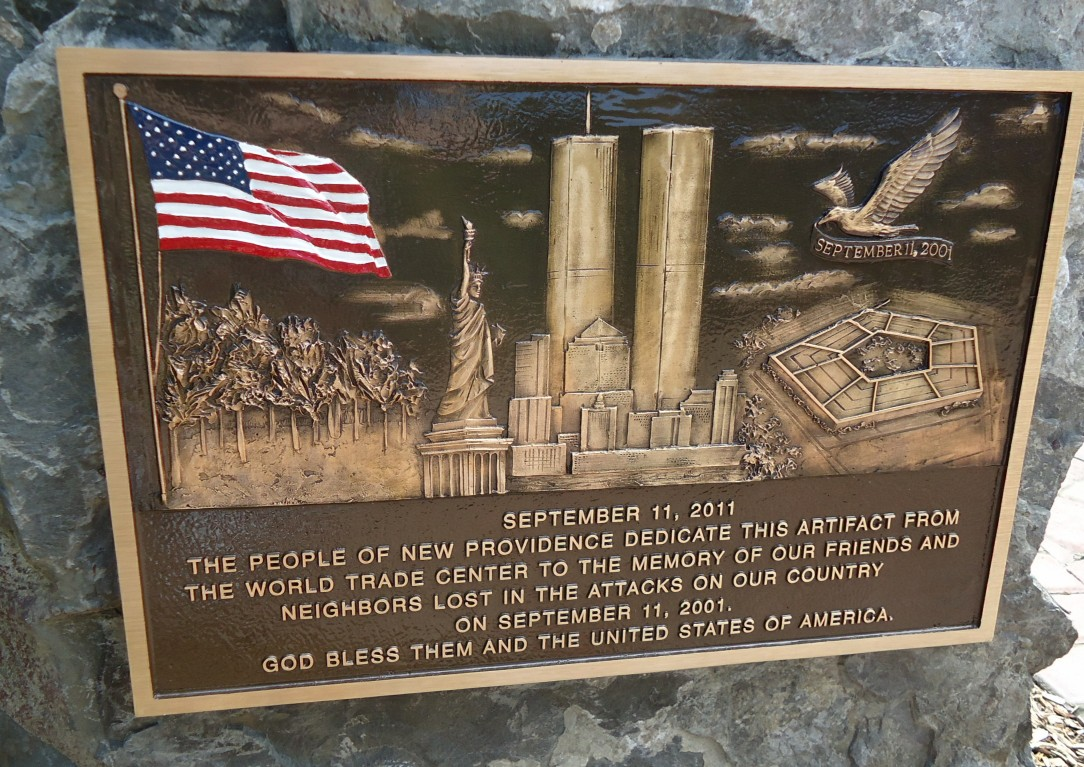
9/11 memorial

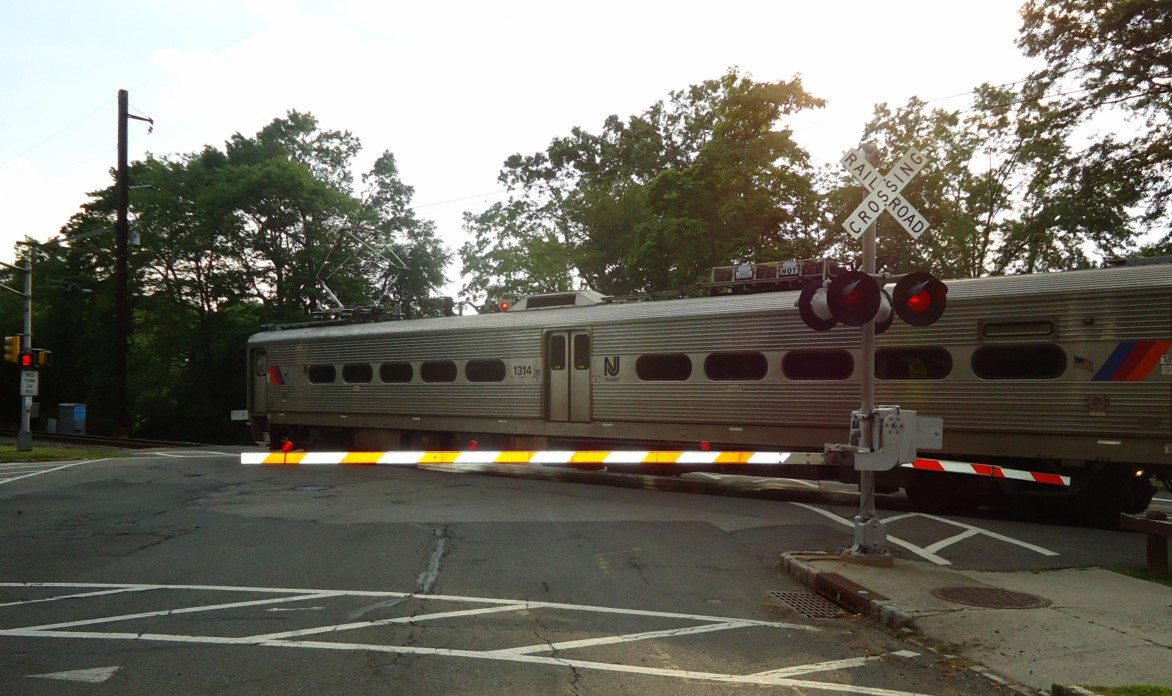
A commuter train

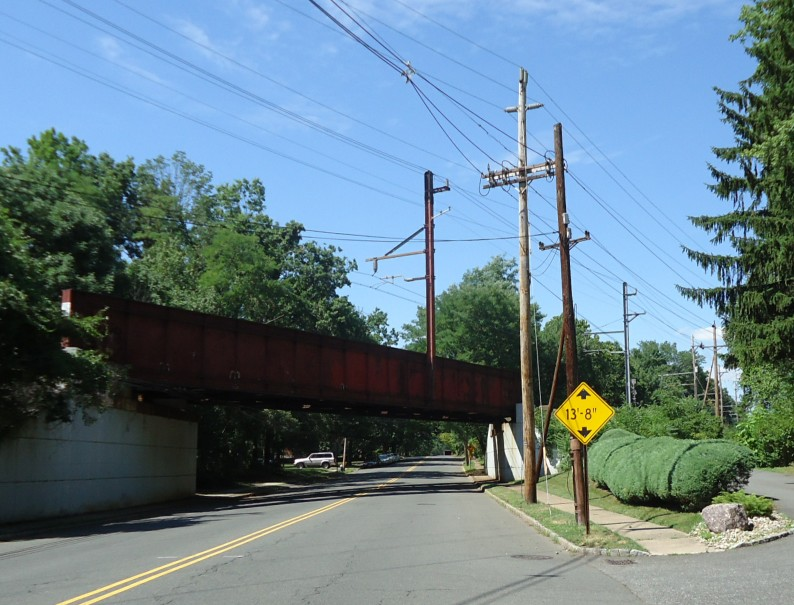
Train trestle

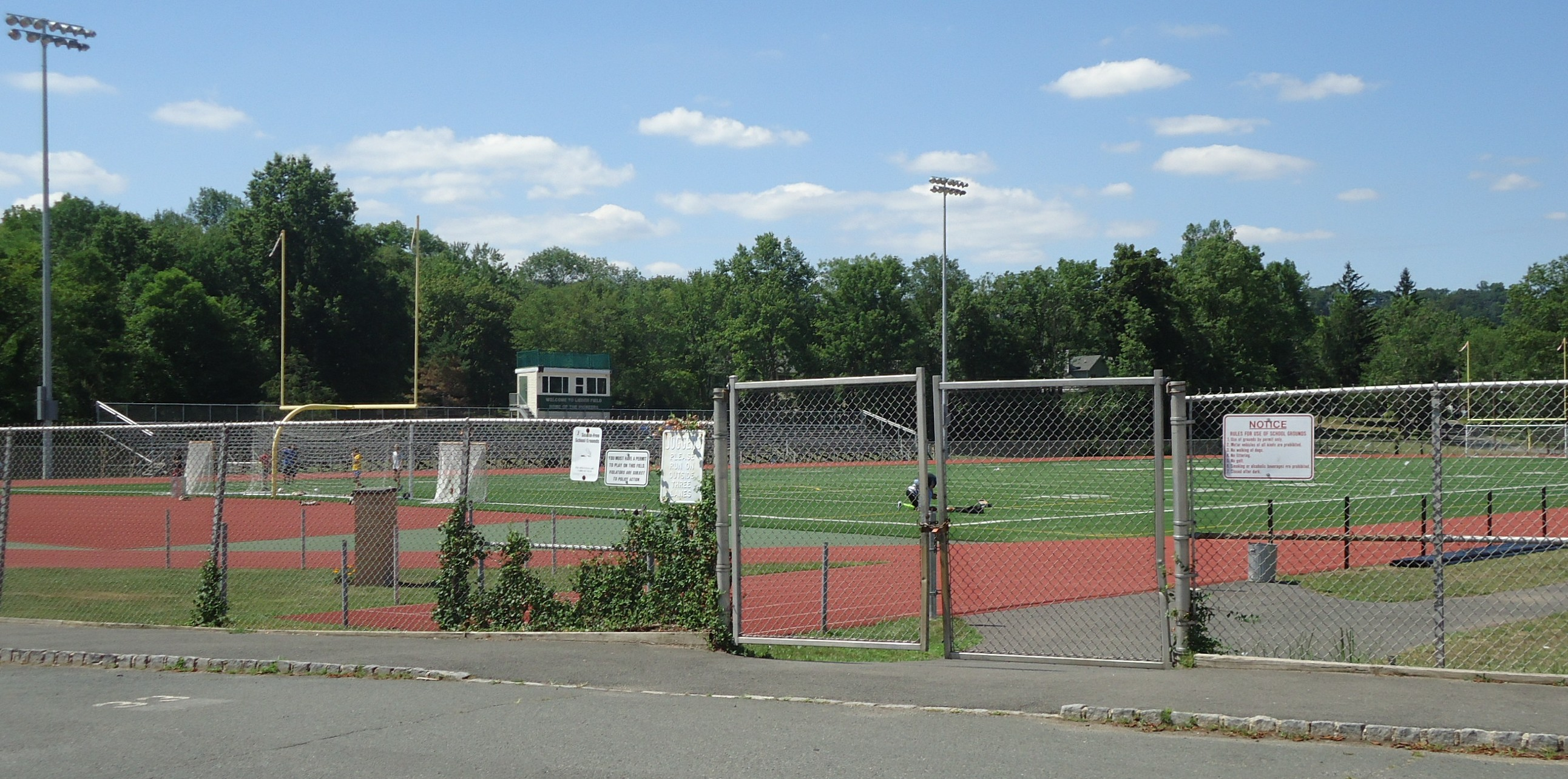
The football field

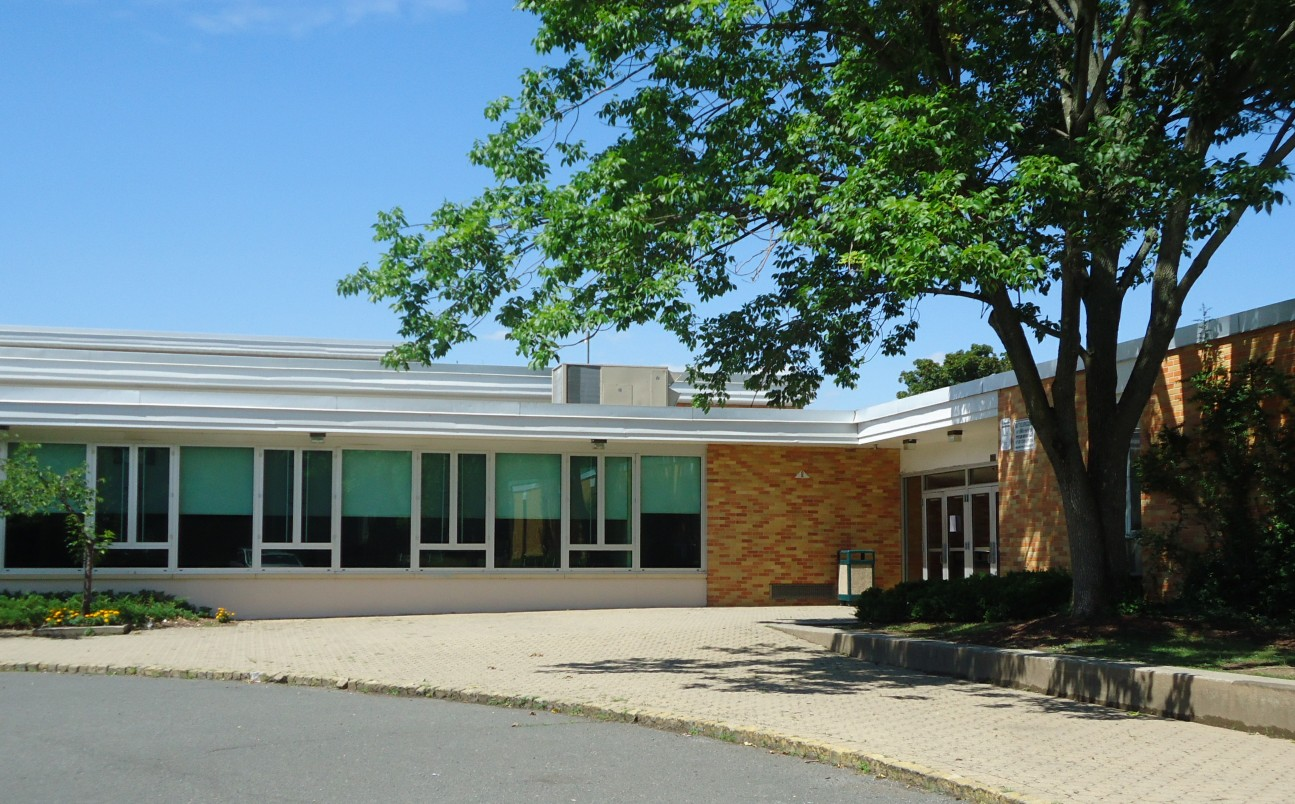
The middle and high schools

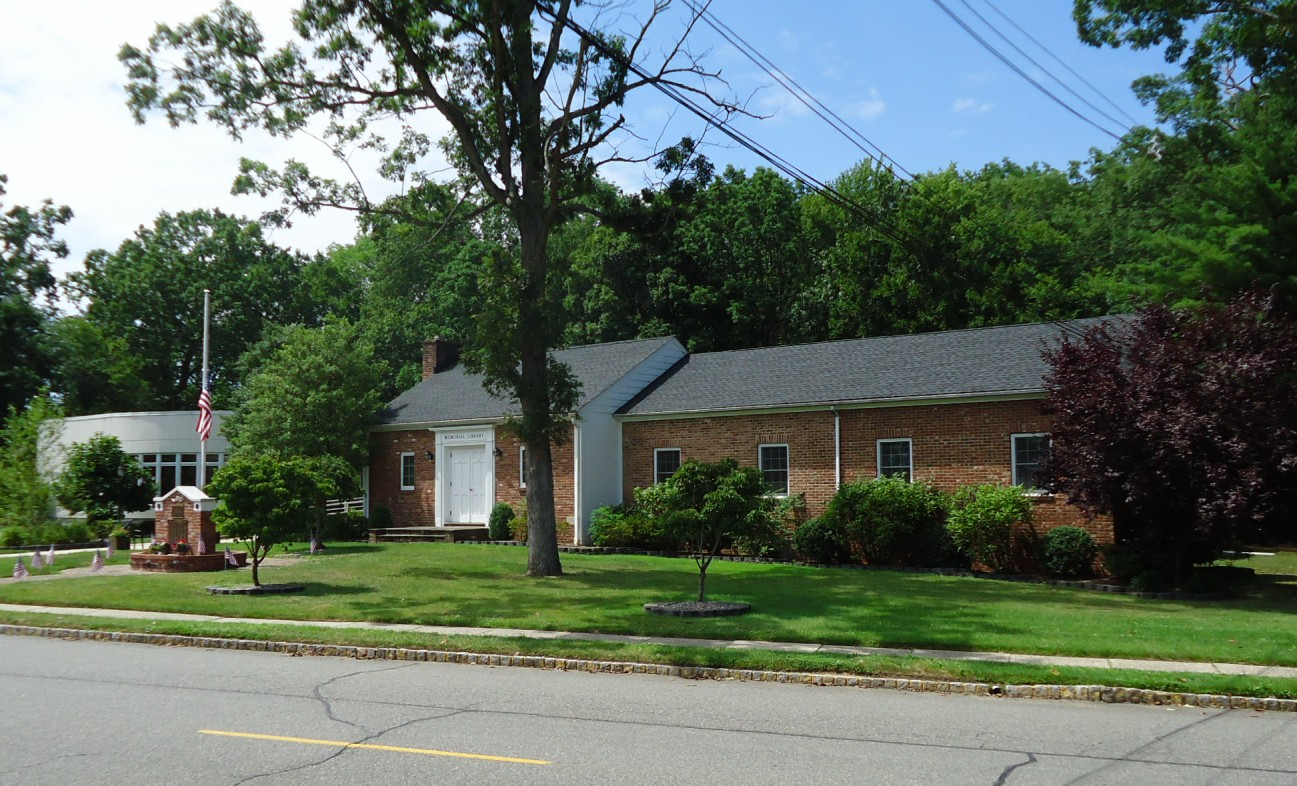
Library

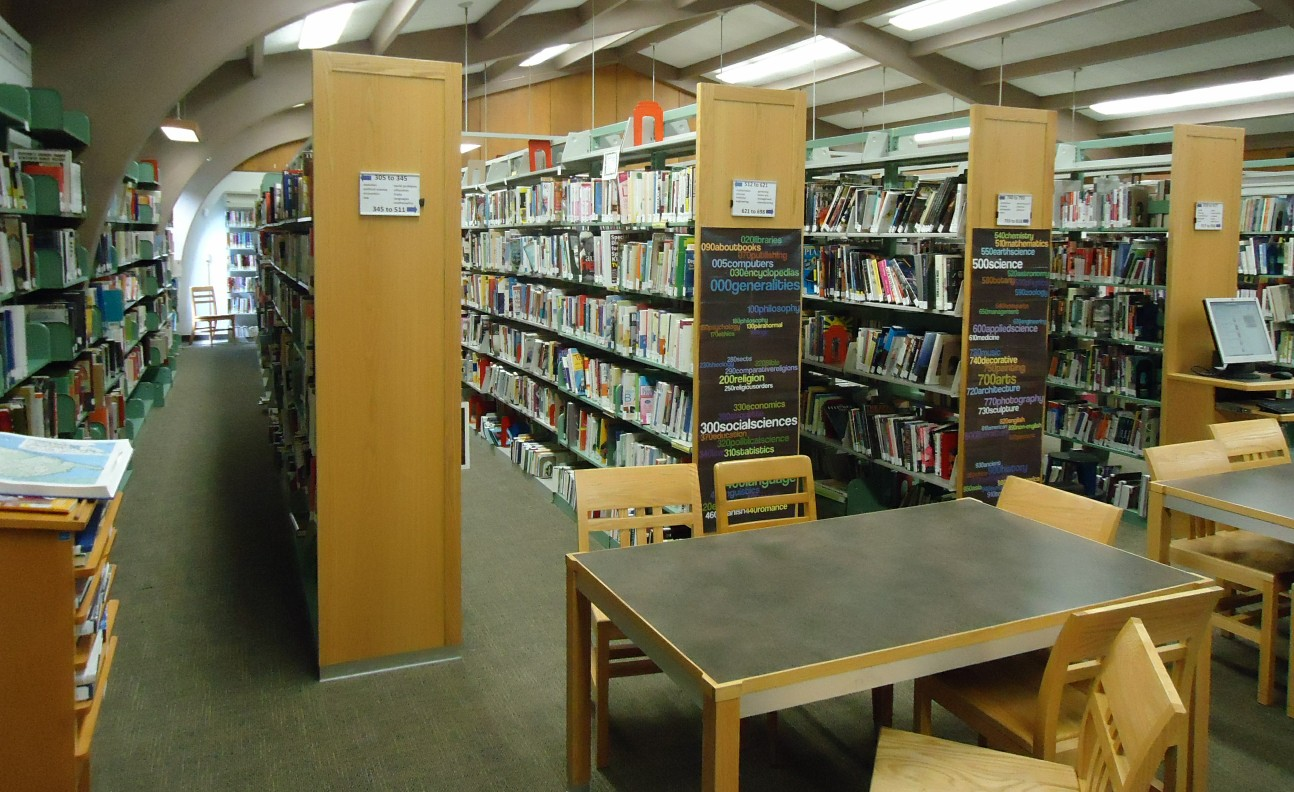
Inside the library

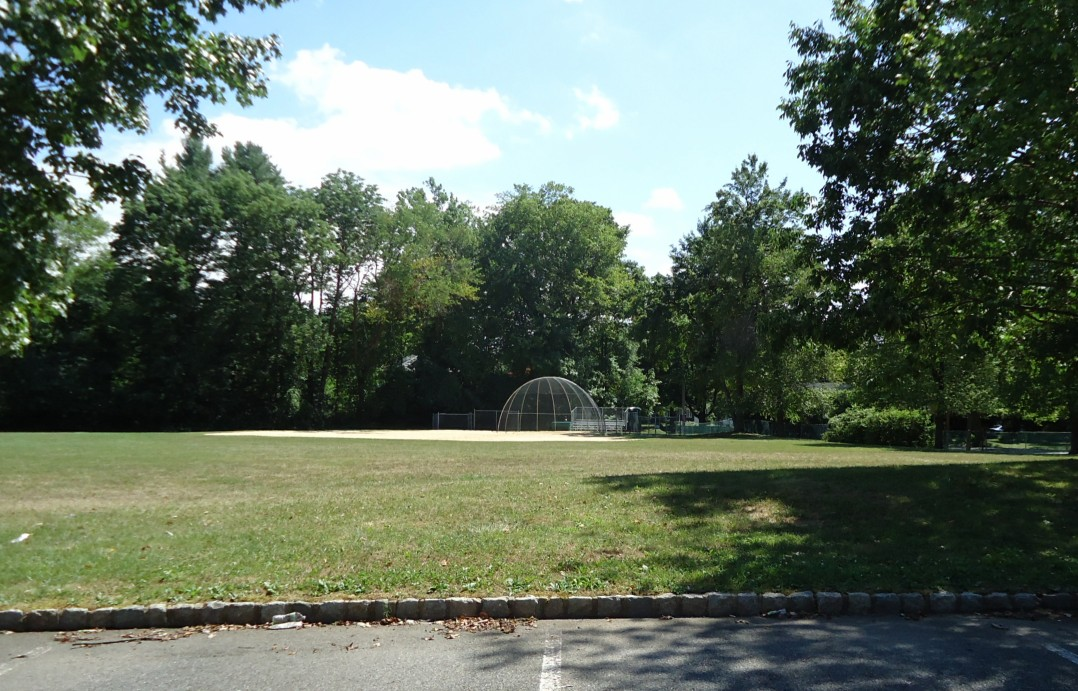
Athletic fields

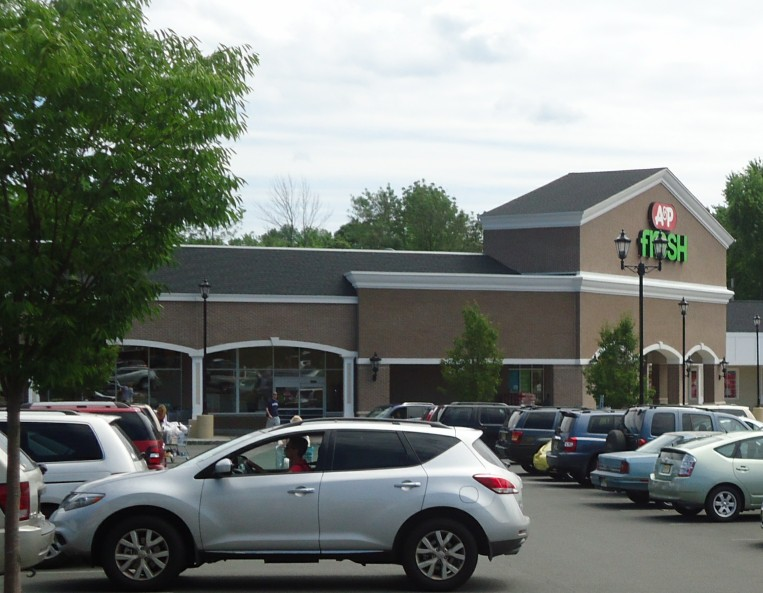
Shopping center
