= New Providence High School =

High school in Union County, New Jersey, US

Location
- 35 Pioneer Drive; New Providence, Union County, New Jersey 07974; United States; 40.7002°N 74.4087°W

Information
- Type: Public
- Motto: "Home of Champions"
- Established: 1958
- School district: New Providence School District
- NCES School ID: 341131005592
- Principal: Brian Henry
- Faculty: 57.9 FTEs
- Grades: 9−12
- Enrollment: 644 (as of 2024–25)
- Student to teacher ratio: 11.1:1
- Colors: Green and white
- Athletics conference: Union County Interscholastic Athletic Conference (general); Big Central Football Conference (football)
- Team name: Pioneers
- Website: nphs.npsd.k12.nj.us

New Providence High School is a comprehensive public high school in the borough of New Providence, in Union County, in the U.S. state of New Jersey, operating as the lone secondary school in the New Providence School District, serving students in ninth through twelfth grades. New Providence High School opened on September 8, 1958, with its first graduating class on June 23, 1960. The school has been accredited by the Middle States Association of Colleges and Schools Commission on Elementary and Secondary Schools since 1965 and received probationary accreditation in 2012. The school opened on September 8, 1958, and had its first graduating class of seniors in June 1960.

As of the 2024–25 school year, the school had an enrollment of 644 students and 57.9 classroom teachers (on an FTE basis), for a student–teacher ratio of 11.1:1. There were 20 students (3.1% of enrollment) eligible for free lunch and 0 (0.0% of students) eligible for reduced-cost lunch.

New Providence High School provides opportunities to earn college credits through Advanced Placement courses and through the Middle College Program in partnership with Fairleigh Dickinson University.

== Awards, recognition and rankings ==
The school was the ninth-ranked public high school in New Jersey out of 305 schools statewide in New Jersey Monthly magazine's September 2018 cover story on the state's "Top Public High Schools", using a new ranking methodology. The school had been ranked first in the state of 328 schools in 2012, after being ranked fifth in 2010 out of 322 schools listed. New Providence High School took over the top spot in New Jersey Monthly magazine's 2012 listing of top New Jersey public high schools, knocking off Millburn High School, which had held the top spot in the magazine's 2010 and 2008 rankings and dropped to fifth place. The magazine cited changes at New Providence that included better performance on the math portion of the HSPA, reductions in class size and reprioritization of teaching positions and assignments in the wake of reductions in state aid that saw the district receive less than half as much aid in the 2011–12 school year as it did the previous year. The magazine ranked the school 17th in 2008 out of 316 schools.

Schooldigger.com ranked the school tied for 40th out of 381 public high schools statewide in its 2011 rankings (an increase of 8 positions from the 2010 ranking) which were based on the combined percentage of students classified as proficient or above proficient on the mathematics (93.1%) and language arts literacy (98.0%) components of the High School Proficiency Assessment (HSPA).

In the 2016 "Ranking America's School Districts" issue by Niche.com, the district was ranked tenth in New Jersey and 81st nationwide.

In its 2013 report on "America's Best High Schools", The Daily Beast ranked the school 157th in the nation among participating public high schools and tenth overall (and fourth of non-magnet schools) among schools in New Jersey. The school was ranked 224th in the nation and 19th in New Jersey on the list of "America's Best High Schools 2012" prepared by The Daily Beast / Newsweek, with rankings based primarily on graduation rate, matriculation rate for college and number of Advanced Placement / International Baccalaureate courses taken per student, with lesser factors based on average scores on the SAT / ACT, average AP/IB scores and the number of AP/IB courses available to students.

== Athletics ==
The New Providence High School Pioneers compete in the Union County Interscholastic Athletic Conference, which is comprised of public and private high schools in Union County and was established following a reorganization of sports leagues in Northern New Jersey by the New Jersey State Interscholastic Athletic Association (NJSIAA). Prior to the realignment that took place in 2010, the school had participated in the Mountain Valley Conference. With 470 students in grades 10–12, the school was classified by the NJSIAA for the 2019–20 school year as Group I for most athletic competition purposes, which included schools with an enrollment of 75 to 476 students in that grade range. The football team competes in Division 1A of the Big Central Football Conference, which includes 60 public and private high schools in Hunterdon, Middlesex, Somerset, Union and Warren counties, which are broken down into 10 divisions by size and location. The school was classified by the NJSIAA as Group I North for football for 2024–2026, which included schools with 254 to 474 students. NPHS's teams have won multiple state championships in sports such as track & field, baseball, basketball, football, soccer, tennis, golf, swimming, and wrestling.

The school participates in a joint ice hockey team with Governor Livingston High School as the host school / lead agency. The co-op program operates under agreements scheduled to expire at the end of the 2023–24 school year.

The NJSIAA recognized New Providence as Group I winner of the ShopRite Cup for 2010–11, awarded for first-place finishes in girls' soccer, football and girls' basketball; tied for third in boys' tennis and fourth place girls' indoor group track & field, plus bonus points for having no disqualifications for the fall, winter and spring seasons.

The boys' basketball team won the Group I state championship in 1965 (defeating Wildwood High School in the tournament final), 1999 (vs. Highland Park High School) and 2019 (vs. Burlington City High School). The 1965 team finished the season with a 21–2 record after winning the Group I title with a 68–59 victory against defending-champion Wildwood in front of 9,500 spectators at Atlantic City Convention Hall. The 1999 team won the Group I title with a 39–37 win against Highland Park on a basket scored as time ran out on the clock. The team won the 2019 Group I title with a 66–56 win against Burlington City High School in the playoff finals.

The boys' wrestling team won the North II Group I state sectional championship in 1983, 1992 and 1994, and won the Central Jersey Group I title in 2005. The Pioneers have had four state wrestling champions: John Ferrara (1969 at 106 lbs.), Rich Billitz (1976 at 122 lbs.), Donnie DeFilippis (1999 at 140 lbs., after coming in second twice before winning the title) and Noran Elmahroukey (2020). In March 2012, DeFilippis was inducted into the Region 3 Hall of Fame for his accomplishments in high school and on the Division 1 level in college.

The football team won the North II Group II state sectional championship in 1974 and 1976, and won the North II Group I title in 1987, 1988, 1989 and 2010. The team finished the season with a record of 11–0 after winning the North II Group II sectional title in front of a crowd of 6,000 with a 20–17 win against Butler High School, in which Ted Blackwell set the state record with 254 points scored in a single season. Head football coach Frank Bottone finished the 2006 season with his 300th career victory, the fourth coach in New Jersey history to achieve that milestone. The only coach in New Providence's school history since the football program began in 1963, Bottone compiled a record of 334–125–7 in his 46 seasons before he retired after the 2010 season. His teams won 15 conference championships and eight state sectional championships, including an undefeated season in 1989 when the Pioneers went 11–0 with 9 shutouts, cumulatively outscoring their opponents 234–20. The two teams that scored against the Pioneers that season were Middlesex High School (43–13) and David Brearley High School of Kennilworth (35–7); none of the scores were against their first string defense. Bottone called it a career at the end of the 2010 season, his 49th season overall in New Providence. The Pioneers went 10–1 en route to the North II, Group I state championship with a 21–8 victory against Lincoln High School of Jersey City.

The baseball team won the Group II state championship in 1976 (defeating Hightstown High School in the final game of the tournament) and 1998 (vs. Middlesex High School). Former head baseball coach Tom Beck was inducted into the NJSIAA Hall of Fame in 2007. He won numerous Mountain Valley Conference championships along with two state sectional titles and a Group I state championship in 1998. In 1990, after winning their state sectional and North Jersey championships, Beck's team came up just short in the Group I state championship, losing 1–0 despite pitcher Ernie Schmidt throwing a no-hitter, and allowing no walks in the contest. Schmidt had a perfect game until the sixth inning when a passed ball on a dropped third strike led to a run scored without any hits.

The boys' soccer team won the Group II state championship in 1978 (defeating Lawrence High School in the tournament final) and won the Group I title in both 1984 (as co-champion with Haddonfield Memorial High School), 1999 (vs. Pitman High School). The 1999 team finished the season with a record of 22–2–1 after defeating Pitman by a score of 1–0 in the Group I championship game played at Kean University. The team won the 2003 NJSIAA North II Group I sectional championship with a 1–0 win over David Brearley High School. In 2007 the boys soccer team won the 2007 NJSIAA Central Group I Sectional Championship with a 3–2 win in over time against Metuchen High School. Alex Pellas scored the winning goal with around 4 minutes to go in the first overtime. The 2007 boys soccer team also won the Mountain Valley Conference. They went undefeated in their conference and finished with an 18–3–1 record. They lost to Arthur P. Schalick High School in the Group I semi-finals 2–0.

The girls' cross country team won the Group I state championship in 1985, 2014, 2015 and 2019.

The boys' tennis team won the Group I state championship in 1990 (vs. Haddonfield Memorial High School), 2010 (vs. Pitman High School), 2012 and 2013 (vs. Highland Park High School both years) and 2014 (vs. Pitman). The 1990 team won the program's first Group I state title, defeating Haddonfield High School. The team won the Group I state championship in 2010 with a 4–1 win over South Jersey champs Pitman High School. In 2012 the boys' team defeated reigning champs Highland Park by 3–2 in the Group I state championship. From there, the boys went on to win three consecutive Group I state championships (2012, 2013, 2014) beating Highland Park again 3–2 in 2013 and overcoming Pitman 3–2 in 2014. This dynasty became the first team in school history to win three consecutive Group I state championships. Between 2010 and 2014, the boys tennis team also won the most consecutive state sectional championships, five in a row, beating Jonathan Dayton High School each time.

The boys' track team won the Group I spring / outdoor track state championship in 1994 and 2000.

The boys' track team won the indoor track Group I state championship in 1995 (as co-champion).

The girls' soccer team has won the Group I state championship four times: in 2000 (as co-champion in with Haddon Township High School), 2003 (as co-champion with Glen Rock High School), 2010 (vs. Pennsville Memorial High School) and 2011 (vs. Haddon Township High School) In 2004 they won the Central Jersey Group I sectional championship and MVC conference. In 2010, the girls' soccer team defeated Pennsville by a 1–0 score in the tournament final for the Group I state title. In 2011, the team repeated as Group I champion with a 4–0 win in the tournament final against Haddon Township.

The girls' tennis team won the Group I state championship in 2007 (against Pennsville Memorial High School in the finals), 2008 (vs. Leonia High School), 2014 (vs. Glen Rock High School) and 2016 (vs. Kinnelon High School). The 2007 team won the Central Jersey, Group I state sectional championship with a 5–0 win over Bound Brook High School in the tournament final. The team moved on to win the Group I state championship with a 3–2 win over County Prep High School in the semifinals and Pennsville Memorial High School in the finals by a 3–2 score. The 2008 girls tennis team won the North II, Group I state sectional championship with a 4–1 win over County Prep High School. They went on to successfully defend their Group I state championship crown by defeating Pennsville Memorial High School in the semifinals and Leonia High School in the finals, both by a score of 3–2. The 2014 team defeated semifinal opponent Pennsville 4–1 before defeating Glen Rock in the tournament finals In 2016, the team defeated Shore Regional High School 3–2 in the semifinals before knocking off Kinnelon 3–2 in the Group I finals.

The girls' basketball team won the Group I title in 2010 (vs. Florence Township Memorial High School), 2011 (vs. Haddon Township High School), 2015 (vs. Haddon Township) and 2025 (vs. Glen Ridge High School), and won the Group II title in 2023 (vs. Secaucus High School). The team won its fifth state title in 2025 with a 42–36 win in the tournament final against Glen Ridge.

The New Providence High School Marching Band has won USBands New Jersey state championships in 2002, 2003, 2004, 2006, 2008, 2009, 2011, 2012, 2015, 2016, 2018, 2019, 2021, and 2022. The band has won USBands Northern States/All States Championships in Allentown, PA, in 1994, 2002, 2008, 2010, 2011, 2012, 2015, 2016, 2018, 2019, 2022, and 2026. The school's marching band won the USBands Group VI A northern states championship in 2010 with their program Love and Vengeance and the USBands Group VI A national championship in 2011 with their program The Elements, in 2012 with their program Joy!, in 2015 with their program Beethoven 5, in 2016 with their program Cityscape, in 2018 with their program The Energy Within, and in 2019 with their program The Light Prevails. The marching band scored the highest for the Group V A national championship in 2022 with their program FORM-ation, and in 2026 with their program Prisms.

The co-op hockey team won the Public Group C state championship in 2022 with a 2-0 win in the tournament final against the Morris Knolls High School / Morris Hills High School co-op team. The 2023 team repeated as Public C champion with a 5-4 win in the fourth overtime period against Woodbridge High School.

== Administration ==
The school's principal is Brian Henry. His core administration team includes the assistant principal and the athletic director.

== Notable alumni ==
- Andrew Fastow (born 1961), former Enron executive
- Michael Hawley (1962–2020), artificial intelligence researcher, concert pianist and author of Bhutan: A Visual Odyssey Across the Last Himalayan Kingdom, which at 5 by 7 feet (1.5 by 2.1 m) and 133 pounds (60 kg) became the largest book ever published
- Syd Kitson (born 1958), guard who played four years in the NFL for the Green Bay Packers and Dallas Cowboys
- Tom McCarthy (born 1966), actor, screenwriter and director
- Scott Rivkees (born 1956), Surgeon General of Florida from June 2019 to September 2021
- Rat Skates (born 1961 as Lee Kundrat), filmmaker, writer and musician most notable for being a founding member and the original drummer of the thrash metal band Overkill
- D.D. Verni (born 1961), bass player and founding member of the thrash punk metal band Overkill
