= Foxing =

Age-related process of deterioration occurring on paper products

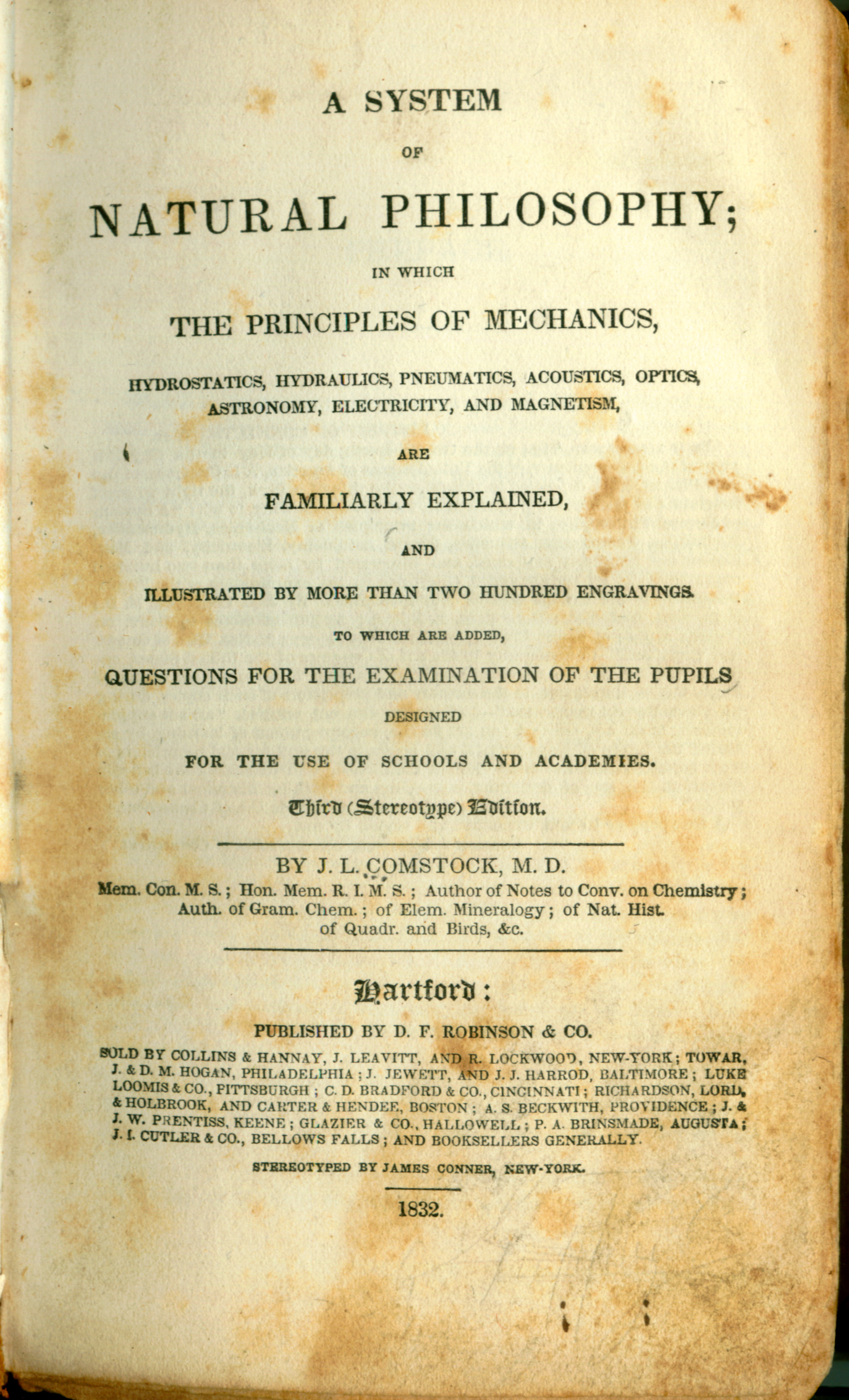
Heavy foxing on the title page of an 1832 textbook

Foxing is an age-related process of deterioration that causes spots and browning on paper documents such as books, postage stamps, old paper money and certificates, and on textiles like clothing and artists' canvasses. The name may be a variant form of the English West country dialect term foust and Scots foze, to become moldy. Alternatively, it may derive from the fox-like reddish-brown color of the stains. Paper that is affected is said to be "foxed".

== Incidence ==
Foxing is rarely found in incunabula, or books printed before 1501. Decrease in rag fibre quality may be a culprit. As demand for paper rose in later centuries, papermakers did not use as much water and spent less time cleansing the rag fibres used to make paper. An early work of art to have been affected by foxing is the Portrait of a Man in Red Chalk, a drawing on paper by Leonardo da Vinci.

Foxing also occurs in biological study skins or specimens, as an effect of chemical reactions or mold on melanin. Textiles, such as articles of clothing, that are affected may also be said to be foxed.

Aside from foxing, other types of age-related paper deterioration include destruction of the lignin by sunlight and absorbed atmospheric pollution, typically causing the paper to become brown and crumble at the edges, and acid-related damage to cheap paper such as newsprint, which manufacturers make without neutralizing acidic contaminants.

== Causes ==
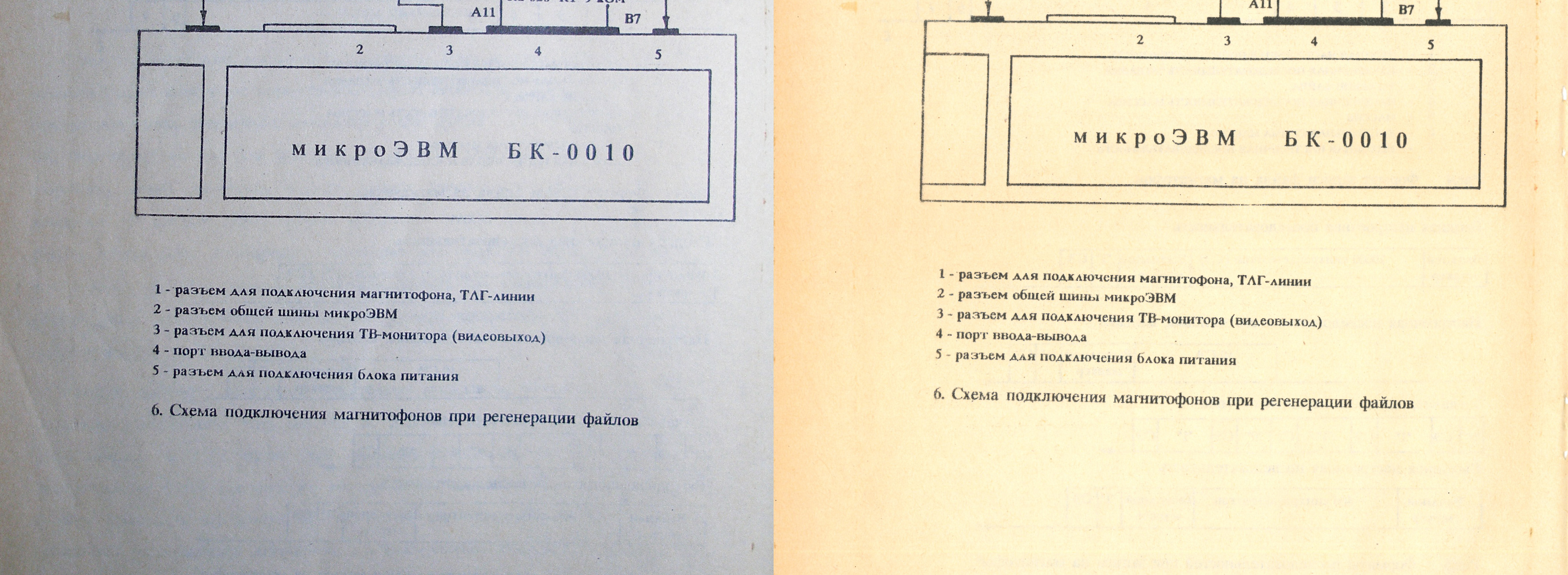
Example showing yellowing of a black-and-white paper document over time. It was printed by a print shop in 1990 and was kept under normal non-smoking household conditions at all times. The image on the left was scanned in 2018, and on the right, in 2023. Both scans were made in full color.

The causes of foxing are not well understood. One conjecture is that foxing is caused by a fungal growth on the paper. Another is that foxing is caused by the effect on certain papers of the oxidation of iron, copper, or other substances in the pulp or rag from which the paper was made. It is possible that multiple factors are involved. High humidity may contribute to foxing.

== Repair ==
Foxed documents can be repaired, with greater or lesser success, using sodium borohydride, proprietary bleaches, dilute hydrogen peroxide or lasers. Each method risks side effects or damage to the paper or ink.

Another method is to scan the image and process that image using a high-level image processing program. This can usually remove the effects of foxing while leaving text and images intact.

== In biological specimens ==
It is generally not advised to repair study specimens, except perhaps for mechanical damage. Type specimens should – if at all possible – not be altered in any way. If foxing affects the study value of a specimen (e.g. in bird or mammal skins or in insects, where it may affect diagnostic coloration), this might rather be remarked on the specimen label. Color standards can provide a means of documenting coloration before or in the early stages of foxing.

== See also ==
- List of used book conditions
- Distressing

== Cited Sources ==
- Smithe, Frank B. (1974). Naturalist's Color Guide. American Museum of Natural History. ISBN 978-0-913424-04-9.

== Related Works ==
- Smithe, Frank B (1974): Naturalists' Color Guide Supplement. American Museum of Natural History, NYC. ISBN 0-913424-04-8.
- Smithe, Frank B (1975-): Naturalist's Color Guide. American Museum of Natural History, NYC. ISBN 0-913424-03-X.
- Smithe, Frank B (1981): Naturalist's Color Guide Part III. American Museum of Natural History, NYC. ISBN 0-913424-05-6.
- Roberts, Matt; Etherington, Don (1981). Bookbinding and the Conservation of Books: A Dictionary of Descriptive Terminology. Washington, DC: Library of Congress. ISBN 978-0844403663.
