= Bhutan: A Visual Odyssey Across the Last Himalayan Kingdom =

2003 book by Michael Hawley

- "Bhutan: A Visual Journey Through the Final Himalayan Kingdom," which is a component of the Libraries Book Arts Collection, is commonly referred to as the "Big Book." It can be found on the 3rd floor of Suzzallo Library, positioned at the entrance to the Reading Room.
- Author: Michael Hawley
- Subject: Bhutan
- Publisher: Friendly Planet
- Publication date: December 15, 2003
- Media type: Print; 153 x 117 cm 133 lb (60.3 kg)
- Pages: 118
- ISBN: 0-9742469-0-5
- OCLC: 55206531

Bhutan: A Visual Odyssey Across the Last Himalayan Kingdom is a gigantic 2003 book composed of photographs taken on four trips through Bhutan.

== Background ==
The book was created by scientist Michael Hawley along with photographers Carolyn Bess, Sandy Choi, Dorji Drukpa, Becky Hurwitz, Choki Lhamo Kaka, Gyelsey Loday, Christopher Newell, David Salesin, and Ming Zhang. It was edited by Christopher Newell, and published by Friendly Planet in December 2003.

The book was certified by Guinness World Records as the largest book in the world until 2007. The 118-page tome weighs approximately 133 pounds (60.3 kg) and measures five feet by seven feet (2.13 × 1.53 m) when opened. Each image is nearly two gigabytes in size, and each copy of the book requires more than 1 US gallon (3.8 L) of ink and 24 hours to be printed. It costs $2000 to produce and sells for $10,000, which is donated to Friendly Planet, a charity that builds schools in Cambodia and Bhutan.

The University of Washington, University of Texas at El Paso, Miami University of Ohio, San Diego Public Library, and the Wichita Public Library all have copies in their Special Collections. As part of the Dalai Lama's visit to Miami University, Geshe Kalsang Damdul and Geshe Jampel Kakpa, of Dharamshala, India, turned two pages of the book as honorary guests.

A smaller edition of the book was published in November 2004. The miniature version of 216 pages is 17.2 x 12.5 inches (320 mm). When opened, the book spans over 2 ft (0.61 m). This edition weighs 6.8 pounds and sells for $100.
