= Michael Hawley =

American educator, artist and researcher (1961–2020)

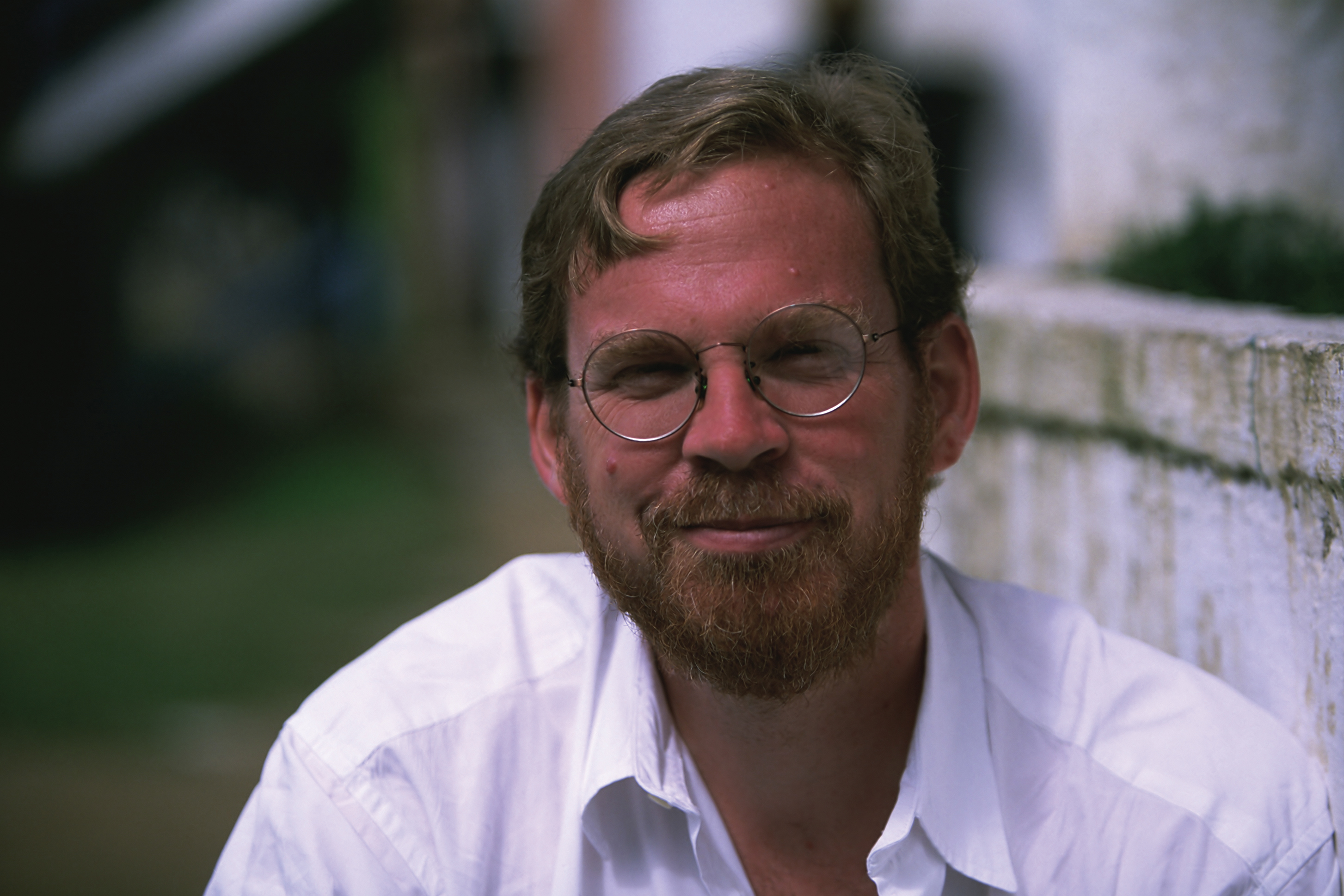
- Michael Hawley in Siem Reap 2002
- Born: November 18, 1961; Camp Pendleton, California, U.S.
- Died: June 24, 2020 (aged 58); Cambridge, Massachusetts, U.S.
- Education: Yale University, Massachusetts Institute of Technology
- Spouse: Nina You
- Children: 1
- Awards: Tetelman Fellow, Van Cliburn competition, Kilby International Awards
- Scientific career
- Fields: Computer Science
- Doctoral advisor: Marvin Minsky

Michael Jerome Hawley (November 18, 1961 – June 24, 2020) was an American academic and artist working in the field of digital media. Previously at MIT’s Media Laboratory where he was a professor and held the Alexander W. Dreyfoos, Jr. endowed chair, Hawley was the founder or co-founder of several major research programs and projects including MIT's GO Expeditions program, Things That Think, Toys of Tomorrow, Counter Intelligence (a culinary research effort), and founder of the nonprofit organization Friendly Planet. He notably was the scientific director of the American Expedition on Mount Everest in 1998, one of the first major scientific expeditions on Everest. Hawley's work has been featured in major media such as National Geographic, Time, The New York Times, and on numerous television networks. His work at MIT has, in his own words, “sought to creatively stretch digital infrastructures, embedding intelligence into all sorts of artifacts and advancing the web of communications.”

== Biography ==
Hawley was born in November 1961 at Marine Corps Base Camp Pendleton, and grew up in New Providence, New Jersey. He graduated New Providence High School in 1979. As a teenager he had a job at Bell Labs in Murray Hill, working in the linguistics department. He did his undergraduate work at Yale University in the areas of music and computer science; he went on to do his doctoral work at the Massachusetts Institute of Technology (MIT).

Hawley's audio and video projects at The Droid Works, an affiliate of Lucasfilm Ltd., are described in the book Programmers at Work, a collection of interviews published by Microsoft Press in 1986.

In the early 1990s, while working at NeXT, he was key in the development of the world's first digital library, creating digital versions of Shakespeare and other classics. From 1993-2002, he was on the faculty at MIT as the Dreyfoos chair, and from there he became Director of Special Projects at MIT's Media Laboratory. Musical work from this period appeared on a CD, Computing Systems Usenix Music, distributed as a supplement to the journal Computing Systems. Michael's work and research have spanned the topics of psychology, computer music, digital video editing, human–computer interfaces, documentary photography, and more.

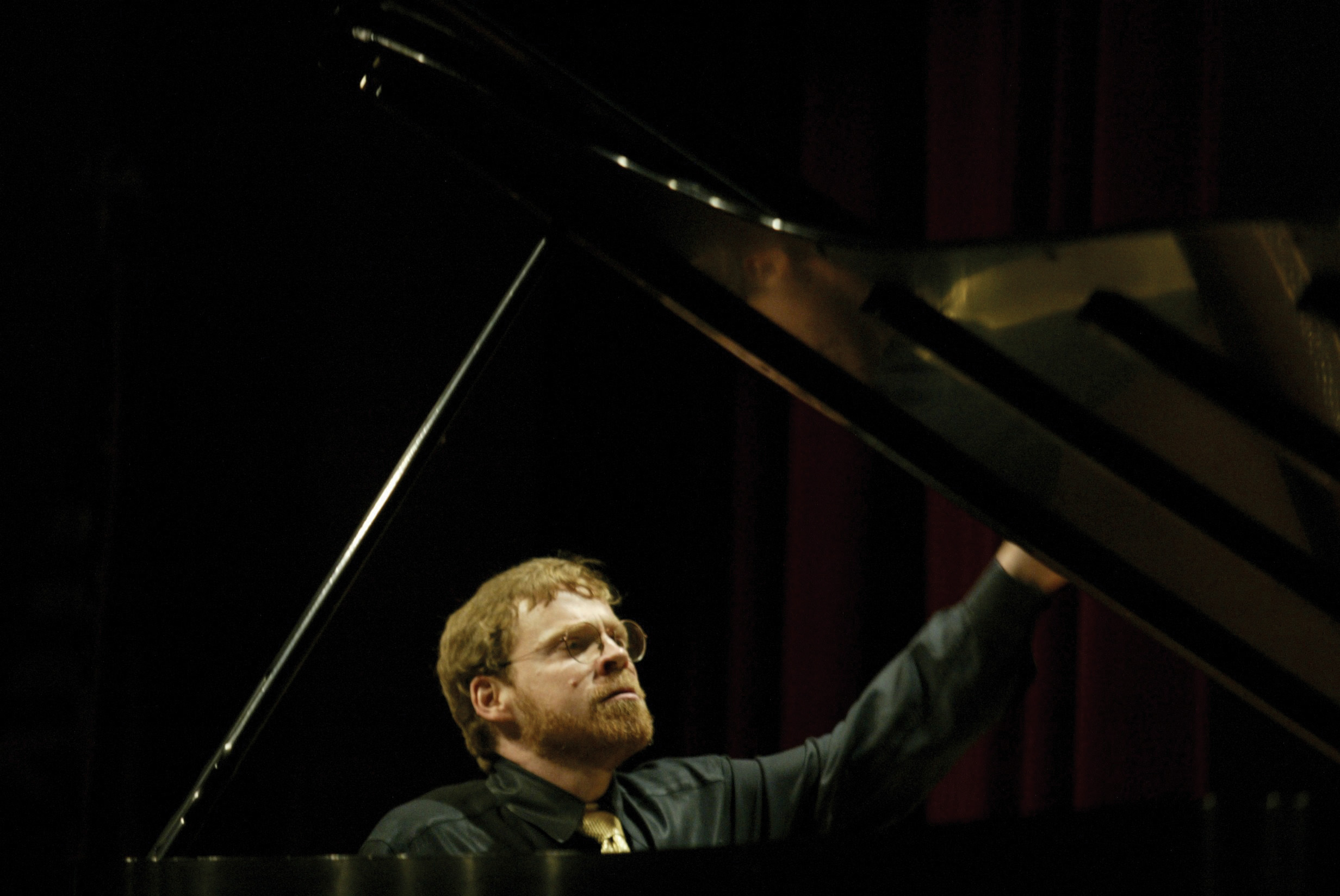
Michael Hawley at the piano in Fort Worth, TX (2002)

Hawley was also a pianist and organist. He won first place, tying with Victoria Bragin, at the third International Piano Competition for Outstanding Amateurs, hosted by the Van Cliburn Foundation in 2002. His teachers have included Earl Wild and Ward Davenny, and he has performed solo recitals, chamber concerts and appeared as soloist with major orchestras. Notably, his competition pieces included his own piano arrangement of Leonard Bernstein's Symphonic Dances from "West Side Story". He also accompanied cellist Yo-Yo Ma in performing the wedding march at the marriage of TV host and scientist Bill Nye and musician and author Blair Tindall at Richard Saul Wurman’s 2006 "The Entertainment Gathering" conference (EG1). Hawley also directed EG3 in Monterey, California, in 2008. He was prominently featured in the 2010 documentary Bach & Friends.

He was the scientific director of an expedition to Mount Everest in 1998.

== Personal life ==
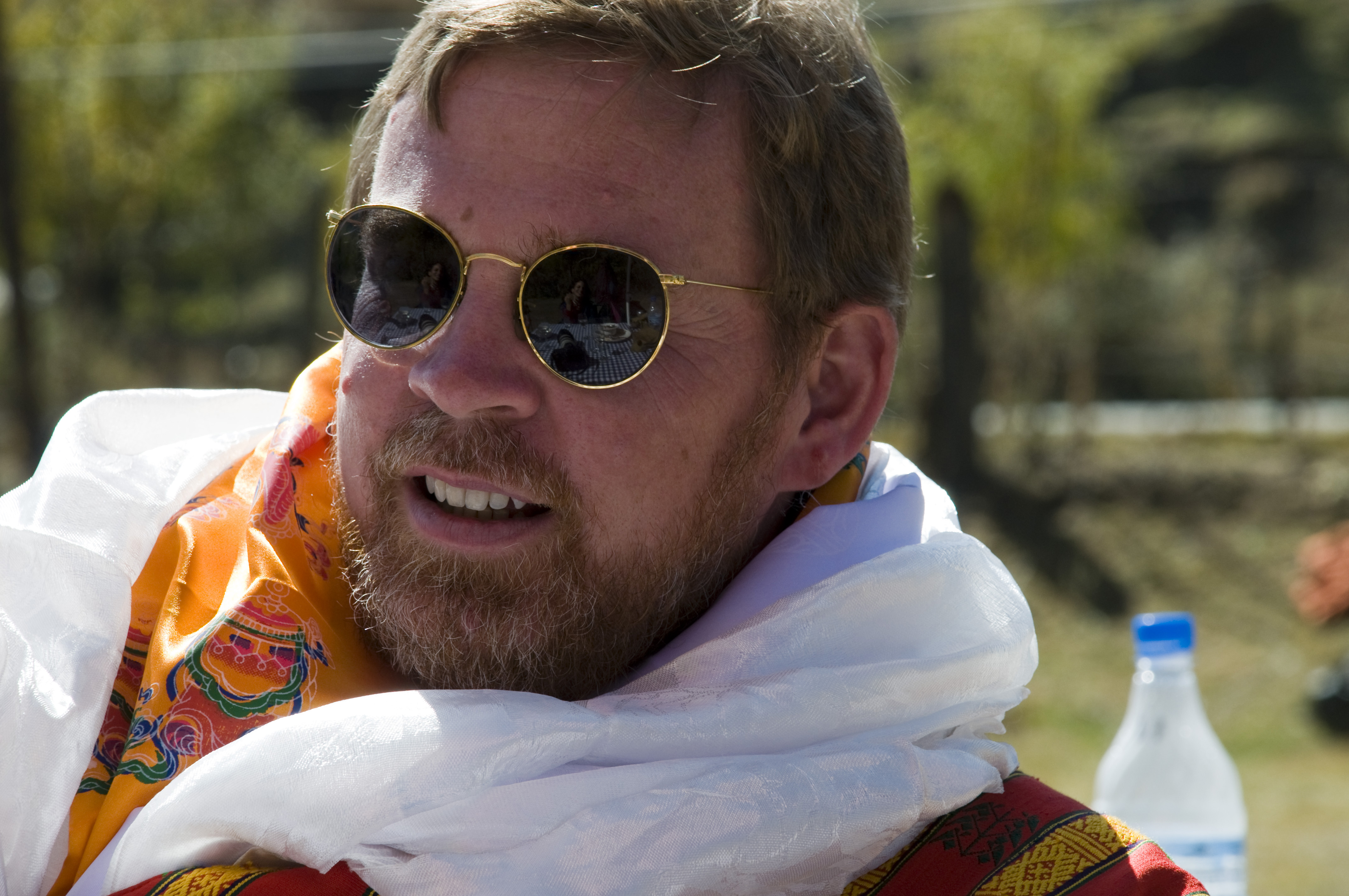
Michael Hawley in Paro, Bhutan (November 2009)

Hawley and Cambodian-born Nina You were married in Bhutan in a traditional Bhutanese blessing ceremony held at Kyichu Lhakhang, a 7th-century temple that is considered to be one of the most sacred sites in Bhutan. Previously, he and Nina eloped privately in Venice.

Hawley and You resided with their son in a historic church in Cambridge where he owned three pianos.

Their dogs, Tashi and Karma, are Bjop-chi mastiffs from Bhutan. Virtually unknown outside the Himalayas, this working breed is an ancient Bhutanese mountain form of Tibetan Mastiff and for thousands of years has been the loyal family dog of high-altitude peoples like the Brokpa seminomadic yak herders of Merak and Sakteng.

Hawley died on June 24, 2020, from colon cancer, at his home in Cambridge.

== Notable works ==
- Bhutan: A Visual Odyssey Across the Last Himalayan Kingdom (2003) – The world's largest published book, a photo documentary of the kingdom of Bhutan.
- "Michael Hawley's Bhutan" (2003) – Article and photos for National Geographic's Traveler magazine.
- Counter Intelligence project (2001:ended) – Integrating high technology into the kitchen to foster a return to the “hearth” as the center of family life.
- Toys of Tomorrow project (2002:ended) – Exploring and implementing technologies with several major toy companies to improve the way children learn and play.
- Things That Think project (2000) - Sponsor-driven effort to develop digitally augmented objects and environments.

== Advisory and founding roles ==
- Board of Directors, SiOnyx
- Board of Directors, Eastman Kodak
- Board of Directors, Color Kinetics
- Founder, Friendly Planet
- Board of Directors, Rutgers Institute of Jazz Studies
- Advisory Board, TTI/Vanguard
- Fellow/Trustee, Jonathan Edwards College, Yale University
- Founding US Editor, Personal and Ubiquitous Computing
