= Wrecking Everything – An Evening in Asbury Park =

Wrecking Everything - An Evening in Asbury Park

Video by Overkill
- Released: Sep 24, 2002
- Recorded: Mar 23, 2002
- Genre: Thrash metal
- Length: 1:58:10 (Disc 1); 90:00 (Disc 2)
- Label: Spitfire
- Producer: Overkill

Overkill chronology
Wrecking Everything - An Evening in Asbury Park (2002)	Live at Wacken Open Air 2007 (2008)

Wrecking Everything – An Evening in Asbury Park is the second video album by thrash metal band Overkill. It was recorded at The Paramount, Asbury Park, New Jersey on March 23, 2002. This is the first Overkill DVD/VHS and the video counterpart to their Wrecking Everything live album.

== Track listing ==
=== Disc 1: An Evening in Asbury Park – Live ===
1. "Necroshine"
2. "Thunderhead"
3. "Evil Never Dies"
4. "Deny the Cross"
5. "Wrecking Crew"
6. "Powersurge"
7. "Gasoline Dream"
8. "I Hate"
9. "Coma"
10. "Shred"
11. "Hello from the Gutter"
12. "Bleed Me"
13. "Long Time Dyin"
14. "It Lives"
15. "Battle"
16. "Spiritual Void"
17. "The Years of Decay"
18. "In Union We Stand"
19. "Overkill"
20. "Horrorscope"
21. "Rotten to the Core"
22. "Elimination"
23. "Fuck You/War Pigs"

=== Disc 2: Special Features ===
- Batmen: The Return (Chaly Speaks Documentary) – 85 min.
- Behind the Scenes – 5 min.
- Photo Gallery

== Credits ==
- Bobby "Blitz" Ellsworth – lead vocals
- D.D. Verni – bass, backing vocals
- Dave Linsk – lead guitar, backing vocals
- Derek Tailer – rhythm guitar, backing vocals
- Tim Mallare – drums

== Production ==
- Produced by Overkill
