= James A. Bradley =

American financier and Senator (1830 – 1921)

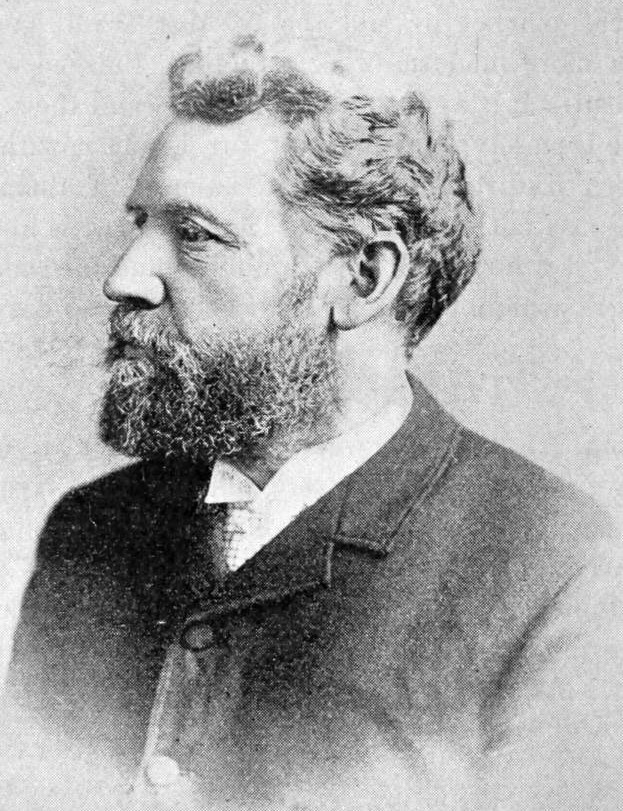
- Bradley c. 1893

Member of the New Jersey Senate from Monmouth County
- In office 1894–1897
- Preceded by: Henry S. Terhune
- Succeeded by: Charles Asa Francis

Mayor of Asbury Park, New Jersey
- In office 1893–1902

Personal details
- Born: February 14, 1830 Rossville, Staten Island, New York, U.S.
- Died: June 6, 1921 (aged 91) New York City, U.S.
- Party: Republican
- Known for: Asbury Park and Bradley Beach, New Jersey

James Adam Bradley (February 14, 1830 – June 6, 1921) was a businessman, financier, philanthropist, real estate developer, and Republican Party politician from New York City who is credited as the founder of Asbury Park, New Jersey, which he established in 1871 as the first temperance resort town on the Jersey Shore. He was also involved in the development of Ocean Grove and Bradley Beach, which bears his name.

Bradley represented Monmouth County in the New Jersey Senate from 1894 to 1897.

== Early life and education ==
James Adam Bradley was born on February 14, 1830, in Rossville, Staten Island to Hannah and Adam Bradley. He was educated in New York City.

At age sixteen, in 1846, he became an apprentice brush maker for Bernalds & Weeks in New York City.

== Business and political career ==
At the age of twelve, Bradley was sent to work on a farm in Bloomfield, New Jersey. He worked there until he was twenty-one, when he found a job on Pearl Street at Bernalds & Weeks, a brush factory. In 1857, he established his own brush making business with J. Sidney Smith, Bradley & Smith, in New York City. The business became one of the largest in the country.

By 1871, Bradley's brush business was highly successful, but health issues forced him to spend less time working and seek sea air as a cure. Through his relationships with the leaders of the Ocean Grove Camp Meeting Association who ran the summer retreat on the New Jersey shore. These relationships lead Bradley to focus his attention on developing the area around Ocean Grove. On January 24, 1871, Bradley acquired approximately 500 acres (2.0 km^{2}) of land east of the New York and Long Branch railroad, between Wesley and Deal Lakes. Bradley named the new community Asbury Park after Francis Asbury, the founder of Methodism in the United States and planned a new resort town that would be distinguished from the rest of the Jersey Shore by its devotion to the temperance movement. Lots were sold cheaply on the condition that buyers erect a building of good quality, and Bradley often personally advanced the money necessary for construction. All lots were restricted from selling liquor.

As the founder of Asbury Park, Bradley served as the town's first postmaster from 1874 to 1884 and established the city's first newspaper, the Asbury Park Journal (1876–1910), serving as its editor and proprietor until 1882. Bradley began Asbury Park's first sewerage system in 1881, and set up water & gas works in 1884. Bradley also served as the first mayor (1893–1902) and as a councilman. As mayor and councilman, Bradley strictly enforced his vision of the city as a dry town. He also strictly barred or discouraged hot dogs and female bathing dresses and enforced a 10 p.m. curfew.

In 1893, Bradley was elected to the New Jersey Senate from Monmouth County. He was a longtime member of the Republican Party, having supported the candidacy of John C. Fremont in 1856. His campaign for state senate was backed by the temperance movement in the county and buoyed by the growing dissatisfaction with the Democratic administration following the panic of 1893. The Republican Party picked up several seats in that election, but when the senators-elect arrived in Trenton, they incumbents refused to honor their credentials and sought to bar them from the chamber. Bradley was one of the most insistent senators-elect and was eventually seated following "historically wild scenes" in which he participated. He retired from the Senate after a single term and was succeeded by Charles Asa Francis.

In 1902, the City of Asbury Park sued Bradley for control of his beachfront property and sewer system; the city won.

== Personal life and death ==
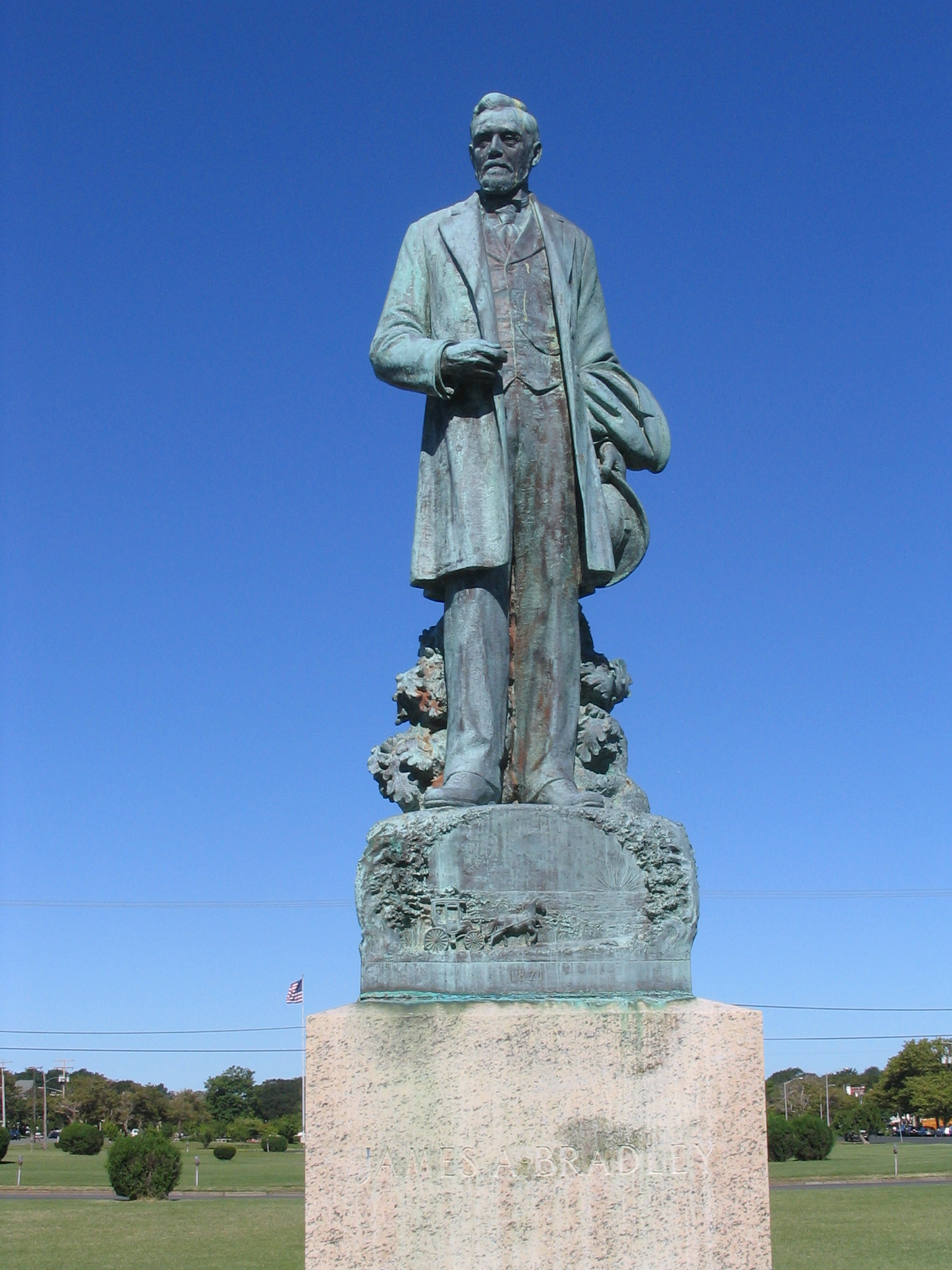
Statue at Bradley Park in Asbury Park, New Jersey

Bradley was married to Helen M. Packard of Boston; they had no children.

Although he was raised Catholic, he converted to Methodism. This conversion brought him in contact with the Ocean Grove Camp Meeting Association, a relationship that was instrumental in his selection of the site near Ocean Grove for Asbury Park.

Bradley died at his residence in the Grand Hotel on June 6, 1921. Despite the success of his resorts, he did not die a wealthy man, and much of his property was still mortgaged. He was interred at Woodlawn Cemetery in The Bronx.

=== Legacy ===
Bradley set aside park lands, waterfront areas, and urban scale blocks, that widened at the ocean. Bradley donated land to religious and civic groups, and the public library. Bradley is responsible for the creation of the mile-long oceanfront boardwalk that remains today.

A statue of Bradley stands in front of the Paramount Theater and Convention Hall complex in Bradley Park. Constructed shortly after his death to mark the 50th anniversary of the city's founding, a campaign began in 2017 to remove the statue based on Bradley's history of instituting segregation on the beach and boardwalk that he owned. Bradley was pressured into this by hotel owners and a campaign by the Asbury Park Daily Journal upon complaints of White visitors in 1885. Previously, the oceanfront was open to all. Bradley openly explained his motivations to Black groups. He felt that should Asbury Park remain integrated and cease to attract White visitors, economic ruin would result. The city's economy was negatively impacted in the 1970s when the number of White visitors declined after the beach and boardwalk were reintegrated. Members of the Asbury Park Historical Society acknowledged Bradley's use of segregation but opposed removal of the statue.
