= Warren and Wetmore =

Architecture firm in New York City

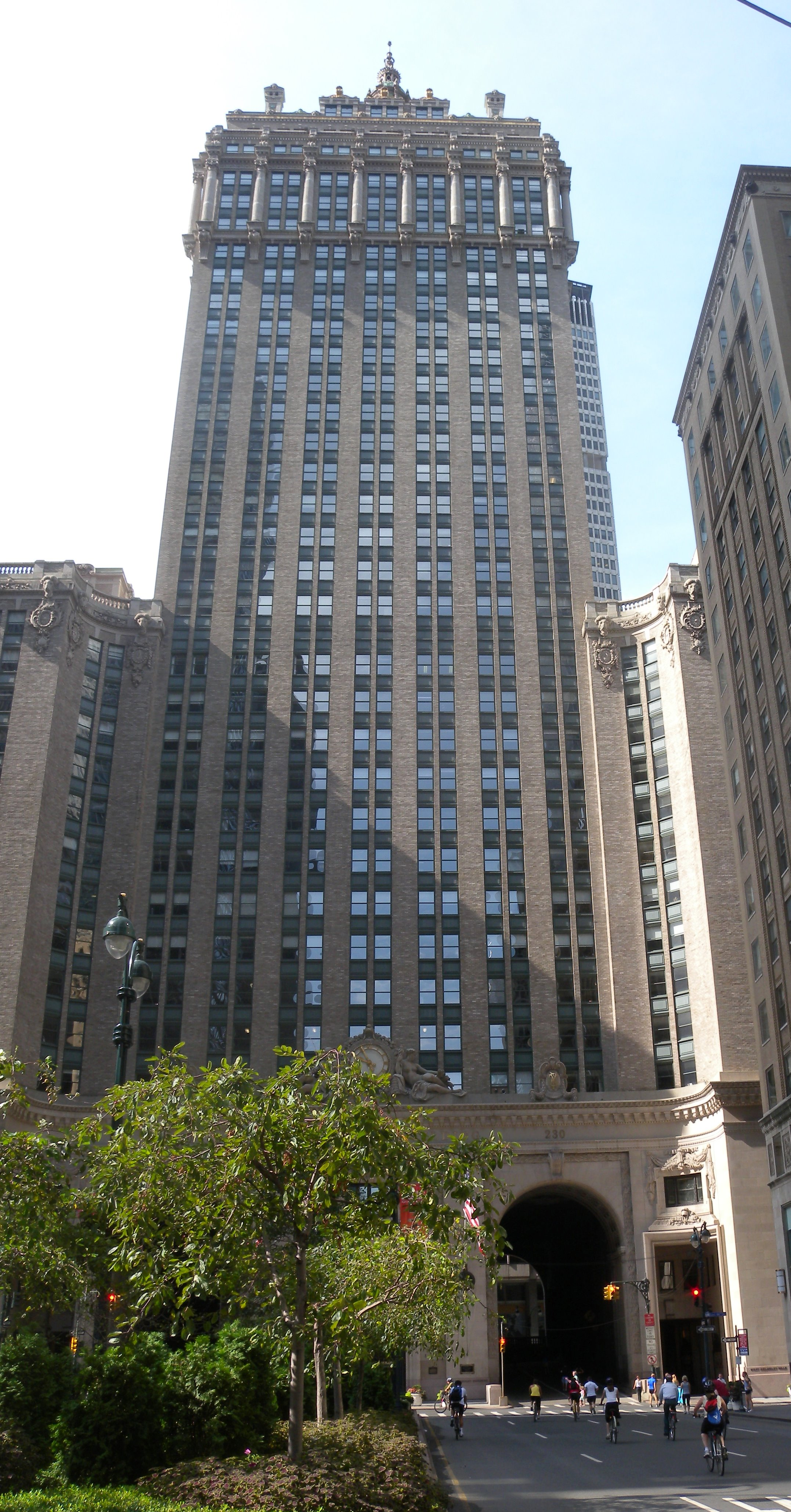
The Helmsley Building on Park Avenue in New York City is one of Warren and Wetmore’s more notable commissions

Warren and Wetmore was an architecture firm based in New York City, a partnership established about 1889 by Whitney Warren (1864–1943) and Charles D. Wetmore (1866–1941). They had one of the most extensive practices of their time, and were especially known for having designed many large hotels.

== Partners ==
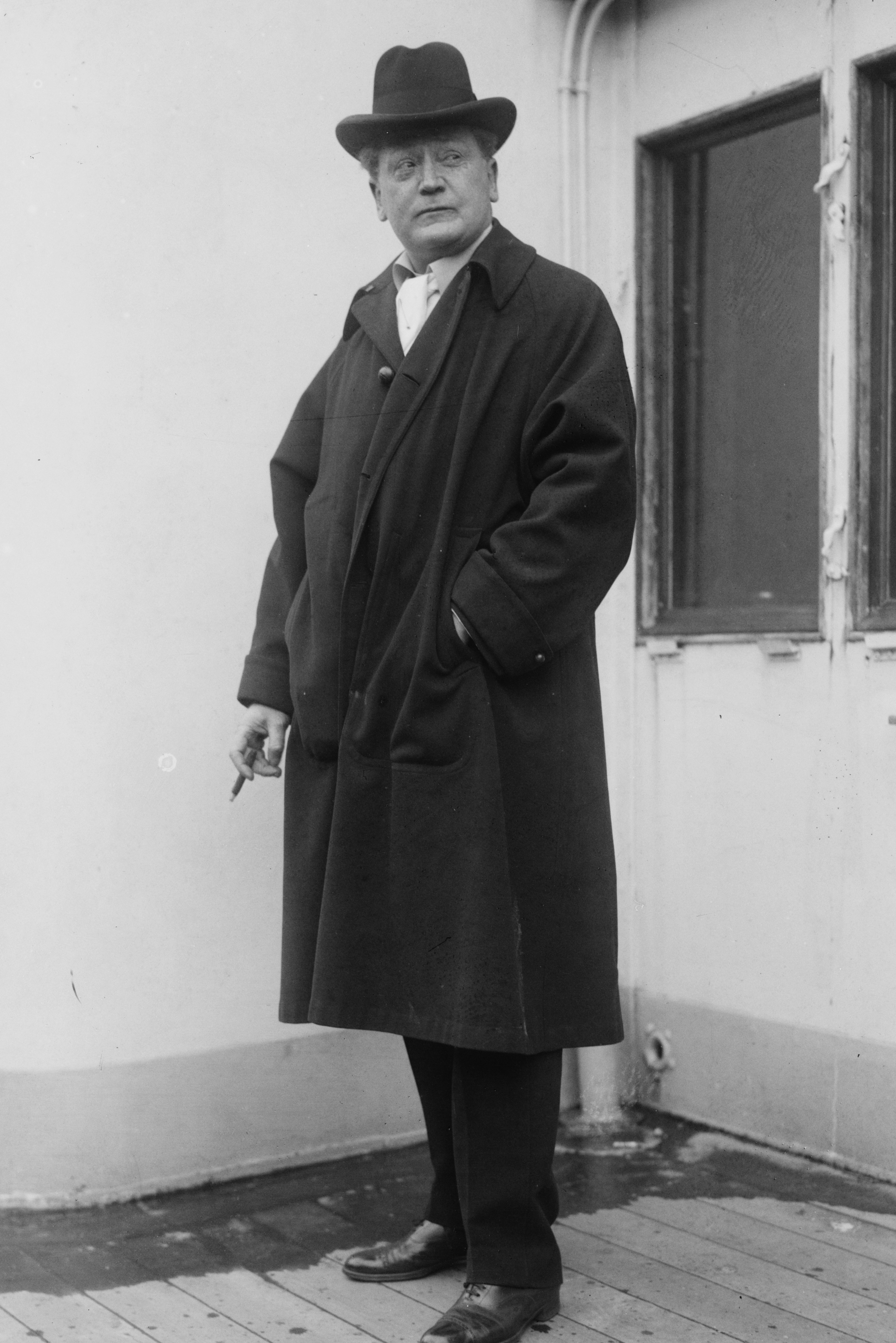
Whitney Warren

Whitney Warren was a cousin of New York's Vanderbilt family, and spent ten years at the École des Beaux Arts. There he met fellow architecture student Emmanuel Louis Masqueray, who would in 1897 join the Warren and Wetmore firm. He began practice in New York City in 1887.

Warren's partner, Charles Delevan Wetmore (usually referred to as Charles D. Wetmore), was a lawyer by training. Their society connections led to commissions for clubs, private estates, hotels and terminal buildings, including the New York Central office building, the Chelsea docks, the Ritz-Carlton, Biltmore, Commodore, and Ambassador Hotels. They were the preferred architects for Vanderbilt's New York Central Railroad.

Whitney Warren retired in 1931 but occasionally served as consultant. Warren took particular pride in his design of the new library building of the Catholic University of Leuven, finished in 1928, which he wanted to carry the inscription Furore Teutonico Diruta: Dono Americano Restituta ("Destroyed by German fury, restored by an American gift") on the facade. This post-war propaganda was never added to the building. The library was severely damaged by British and German forces during World War II, but was completely restored after the war.

The architectural records of the firm are held by the Dept. of Drawings & Archives at the Avery Architectural and Fine Arts Library, Columbia University.

== Commissions ==
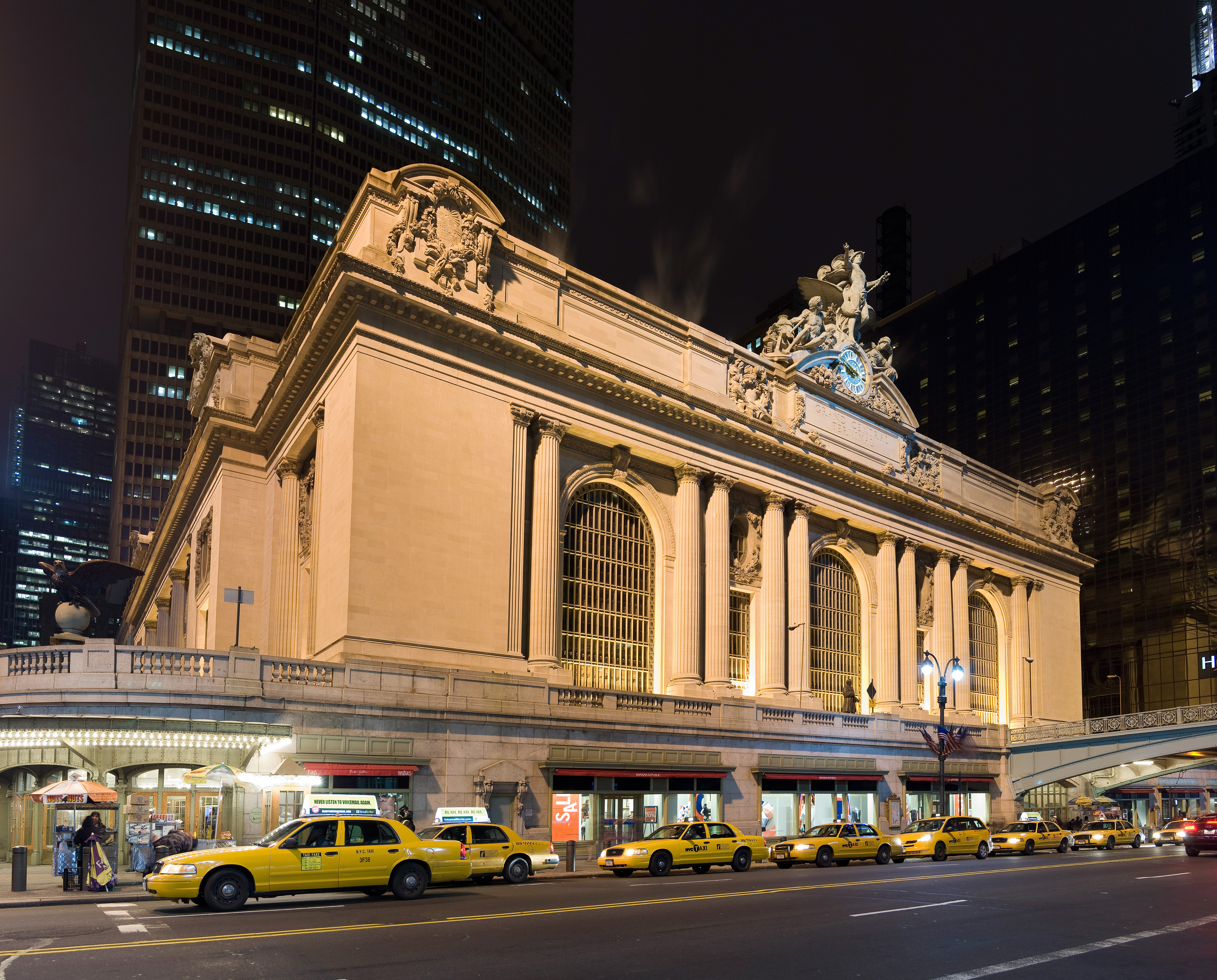
Grand Central Terminal, New York City

The firm's most important work by far is the construction of Grand Central Terminal in New York City, completed in 1913 in association with Reed and Stem. Warren and Wetmore were involved in a number of related hotels in the surrounding "Terminal City".

Among the firm's other commissions were:

- the Racquet House at the Tuxedo Club, Tuxedo Park, New York, 1890-1900
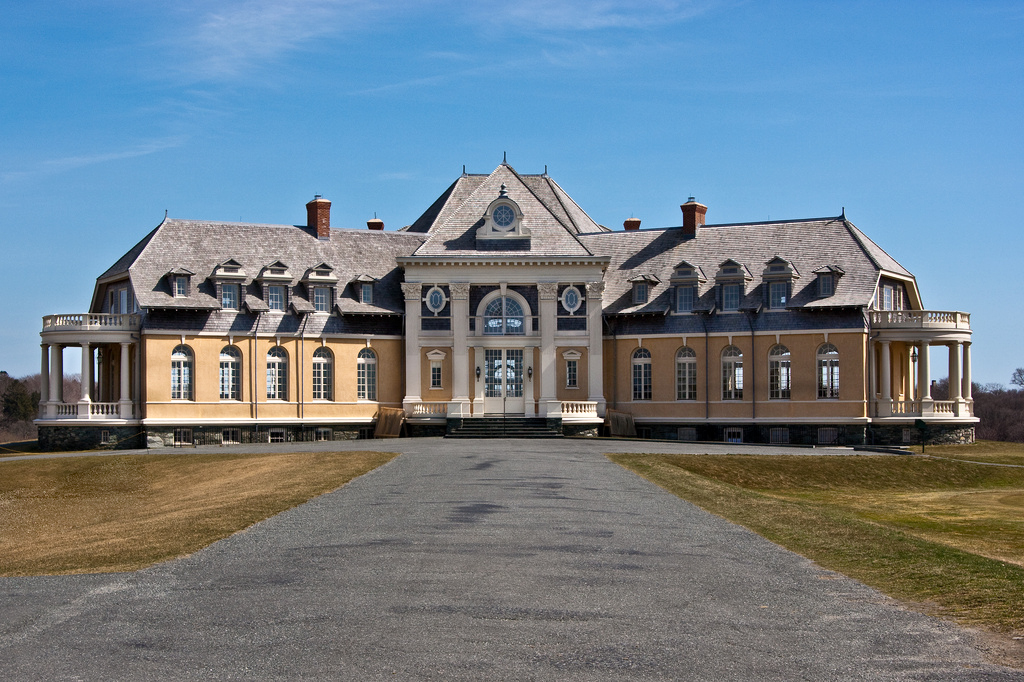
- Newport Country Club, Newport
  Newport Country Club, Newport, RI, 1895
- Westmorly Court, part of Adams House at Harvard University 1898-1902
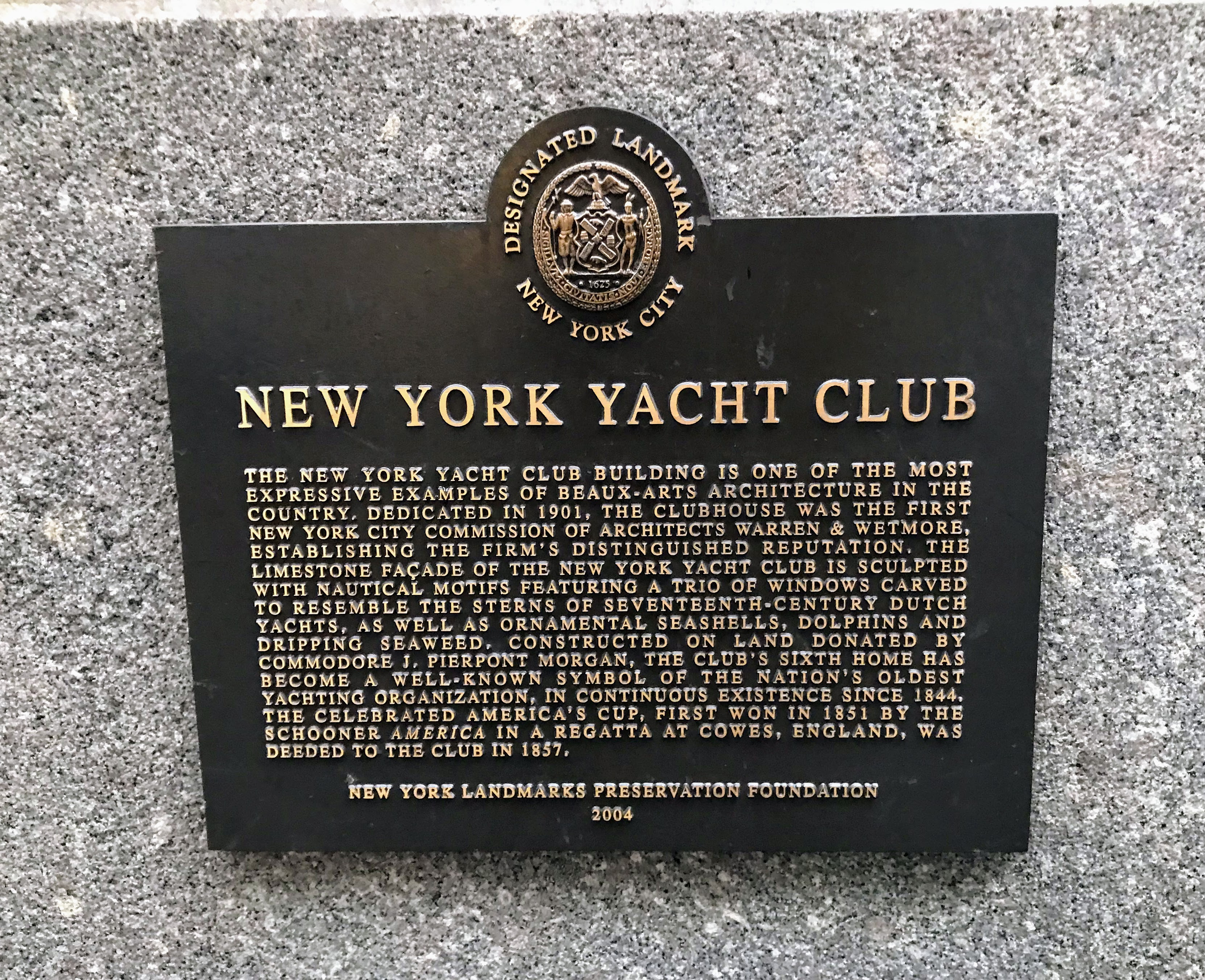
- Landmark Plaque for the NYYC in NYC
  New York Yacht Club Building, 1899–1901
- High Tide, William S. Miller residence, Newport, RI 1900
- 10 West 56th Street, the Edey Mansion, 1901
- Kirby Hill Estate (Eric Kuvykin Mansion), Long Island, New York, 1902
- the Marshall Orme Wilson House, 1903
- the Brooklyn Department of Street Cleaning's Stable and Chateau, Brooklyn, New York, 1904
- Sidney Dillon Ripley House, 16 East 79th Street, 1905
- 49 East 52nd Street, Vanderbilt guest house, New York City, 1908
- Marion P. Brookman Mansion, 5 East 70th Street, New York Coty, 1910 (demolished c. 1973)
- Green-Wood Cemetery Chapel, New York City, 1911
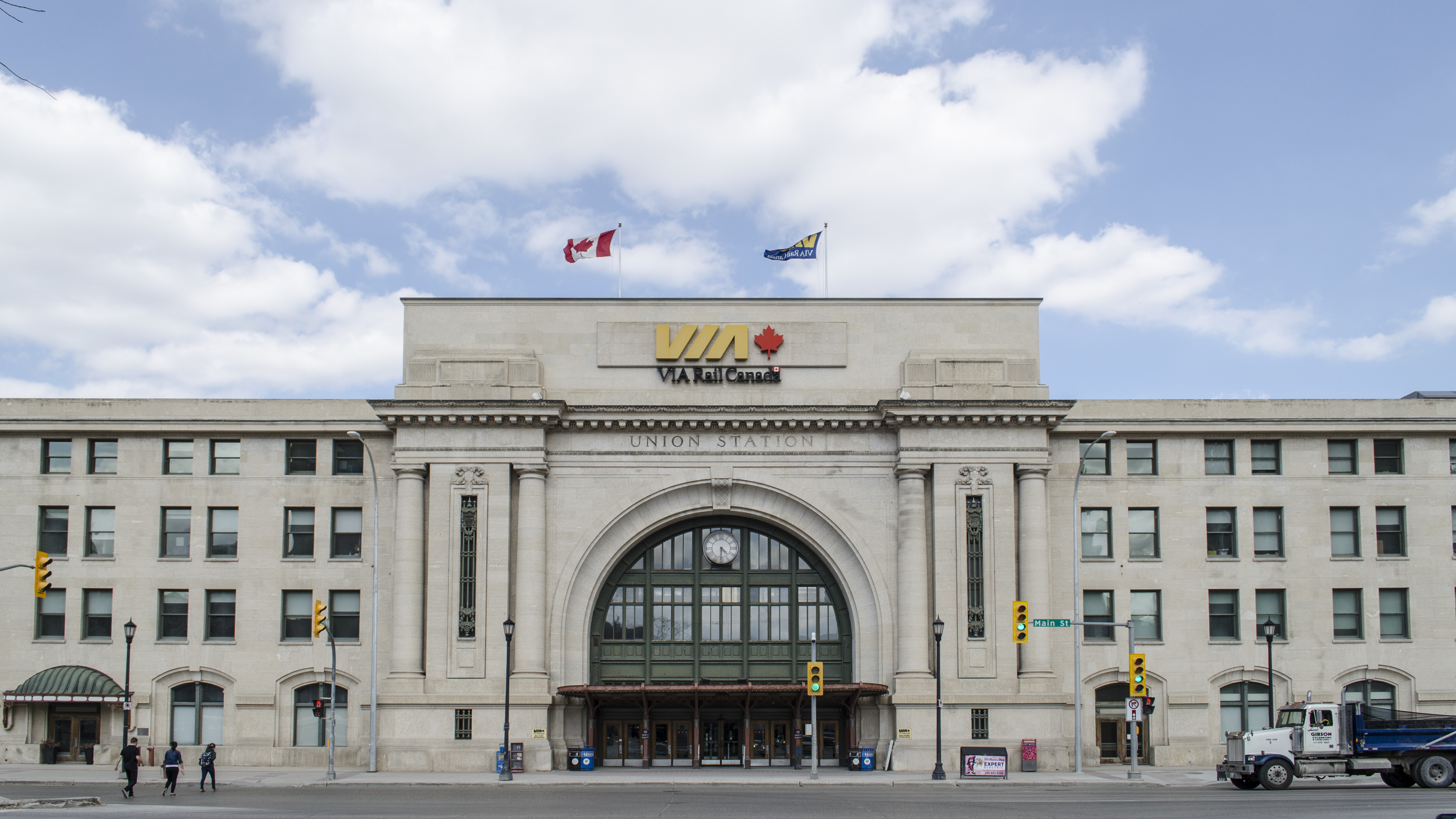
- Union Station, Winnipeg
  Union Station, Winnipeg, Manitoba, Canada, 1911
- Union Station, Houston, Texas, 1911 (Now a part of Daikin Park)
- Condado Vanderbilt Hotel, San Juan, Puerto Rico, 1911
- Aeolian Hall, New York City, 1912
- Vanderbilt Hotel, New York City, 1912
- Ritz-Carlton, Montreal, Quebec, 1912
- The Pantlind Hotel, now the Amway Grand Plaza Hotel, Grand Rapids, Michigan, 1913
- Grand Central Palace, New York City, 1913 with Reed and Stem, demolished 1964
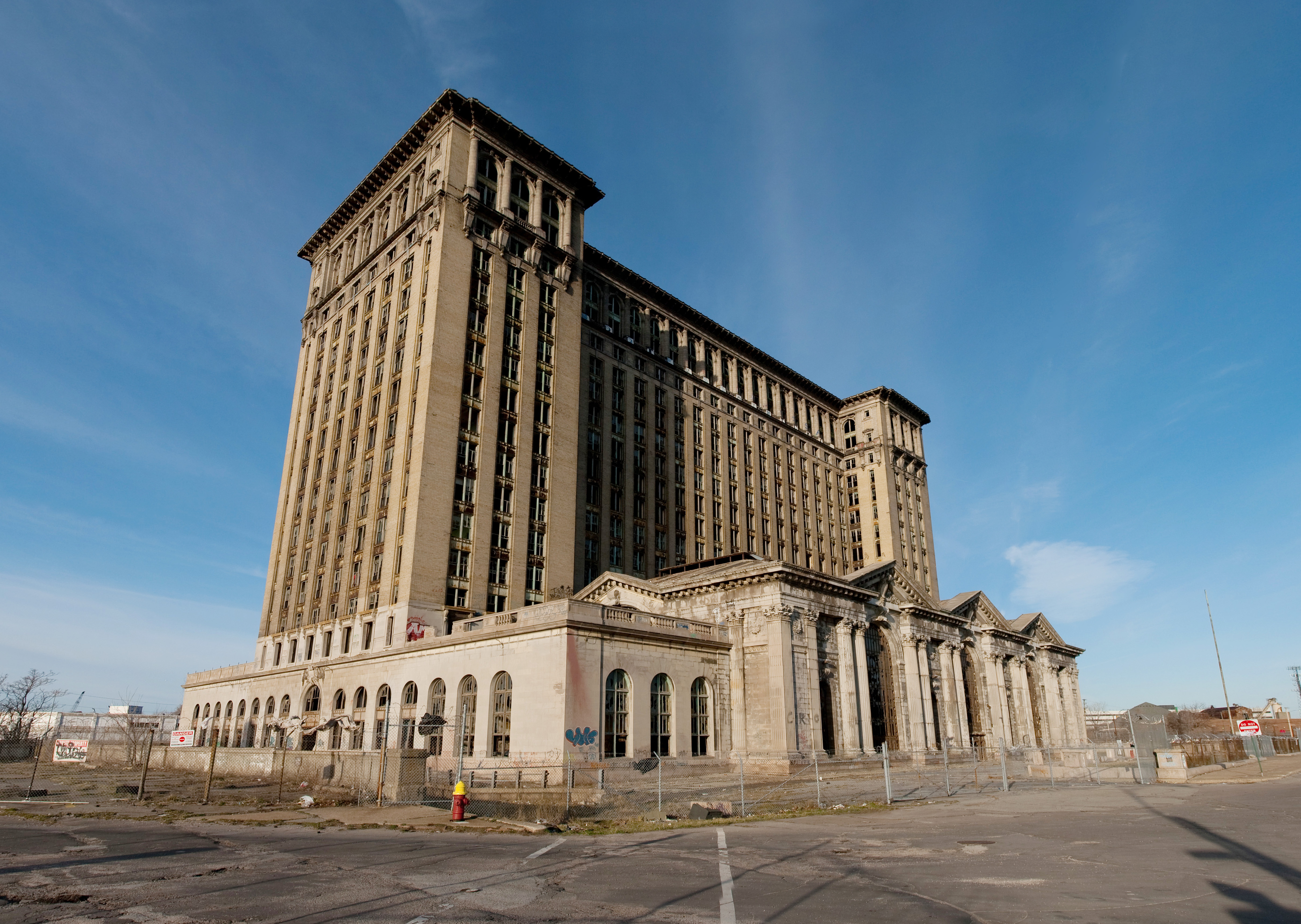
- Michigan Central Station, Detroit
  Michigan Central Station, Detroit, Michigan, 1913, also with Reed and Stem
- Ritz-Carlton, Philadelphia, PA, 1913, with Horace Trumbauer
- Packard Manor, Chautauqua, New York- A summer home for William Doud Packard, 1915
- the Texas Company, Texaco Building, Houston, Texas, 1915
- New York Central Railroad Station, 1 East Hartsdale Avenue, Hartsdale, New York
- Warren Public Library, Warren, Pennsylvania, 1916
- 927 Fifth Avenue, New York City, a cooperative apartment house, 1917
- The Broadmoor Hotel, Colorado Springs, 1918
- The Ambassador Hotel, Atlantic City, 1919
- Struthers Library Building, Warren, Pennsylvania, renovations, 1919
- The Commodore Hotel, now the Grand Hyatt New York, part of "Terminal City", 1920
- New York Biltmore Hotel, also part of "Terminal City"
- Crown Building, formerly the Heckscher Building, New York City, 1921
- The Briarcliffe, 57th Street, New York City
- Ritz-Carlton, Atlantic City, NJ, 1921
- Providence Biltmore Hotel, Providence, Rhode Island, 1922
- Mayflower Hotel, Washington, D.C., 1922, with Robert F. Beresford
- Plaza Hotel, West Market St. Wilkes-Barre, PA, 1923. Purchased by Hotel Sterling, 1927. Demolished 2007.
- Asbury Park Convention Hall, 1923, and the adjoining Paramount Theatre, 1930
- Madison Belmont Building at Madison Avenue and 34th Street, New York City, 1925
- Steinway Hall at 111 West 57th Street, New York City, 1925
- Italian Embassy building, Washington DC, 1925
- 200 Madison Avenue, New York City, 1926
- Royal Hawaiian Hotel, Honolulu, Hawaii, 1927
- 689 Fifth Avenue, New York City, 1927
- St. James Theatre, New York City, 1927
- Consolidated Edison Building at 4 Irving Place in Manhattan, 1928
- Norwood Gardens terrace homes, 36th St., Astoria, New York, planned development by W&W architect Walter Hopkins, 1928
- The Helmsley Building, originally the New York Central Building, part of the Grand Central Terminal complex, 1929
- Empire Trust Company Building, 580 Fifth Avenue, New York; currently the World Diamond Building as of 2013
- the Chelsea Piers
- 903 Park Avenue, a Bing & Bing building.

== Gallery ==
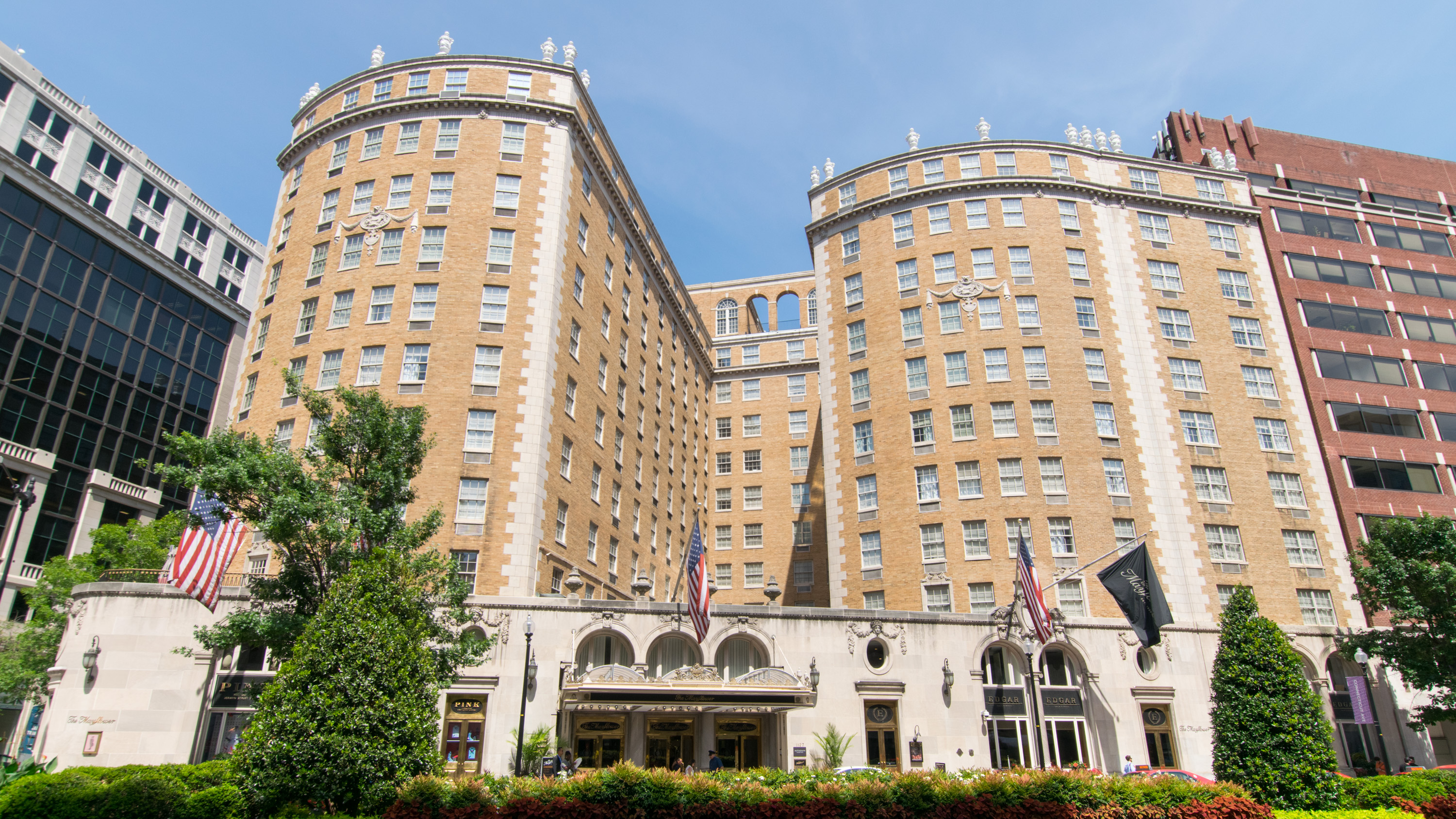
Mayflower Hotel (1922) Washington, DC

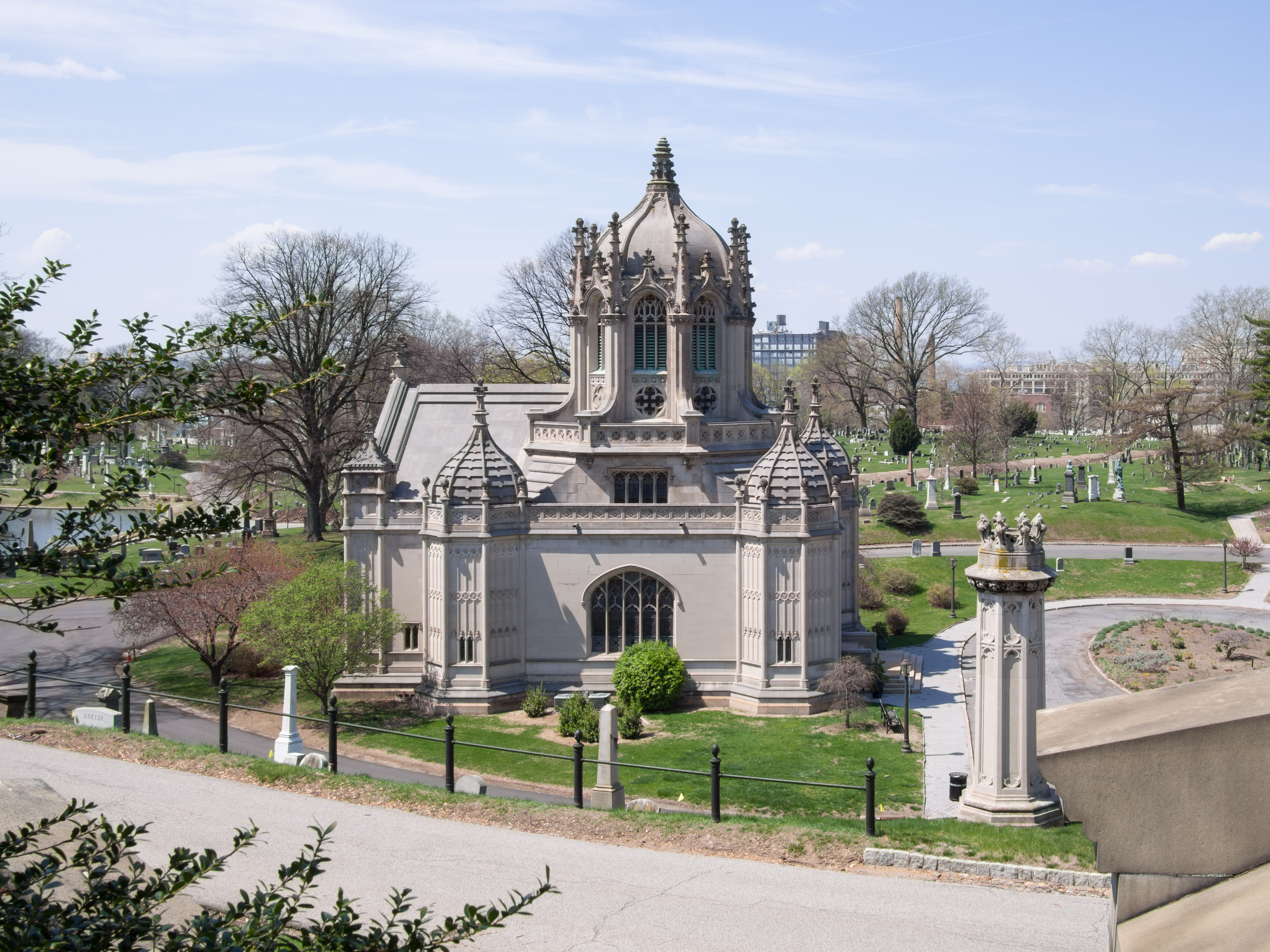
Green-Wood Cemetery Chapel (1911), New York City, NY

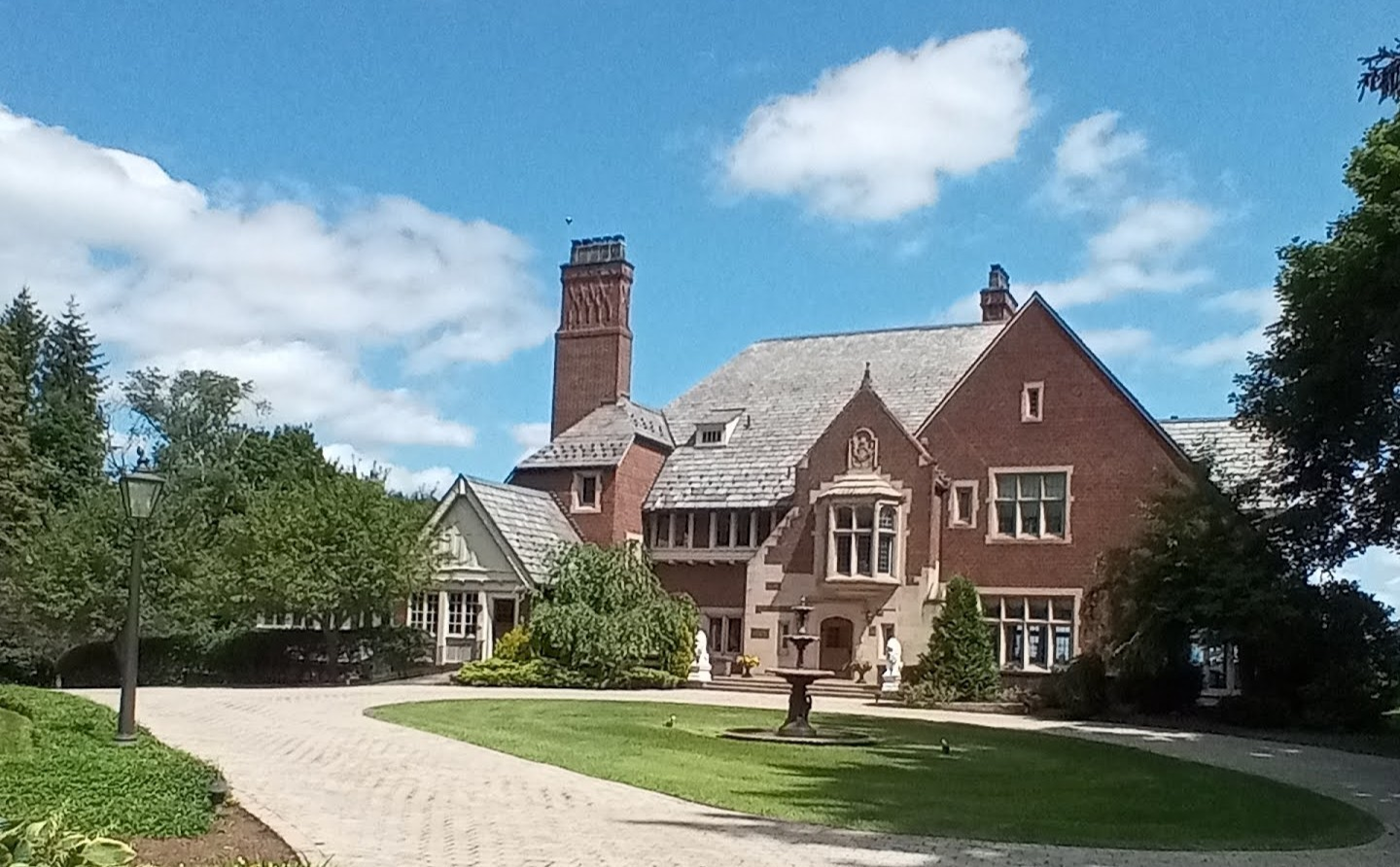
Packard Manor Estate (1915), Chautauqua, NY

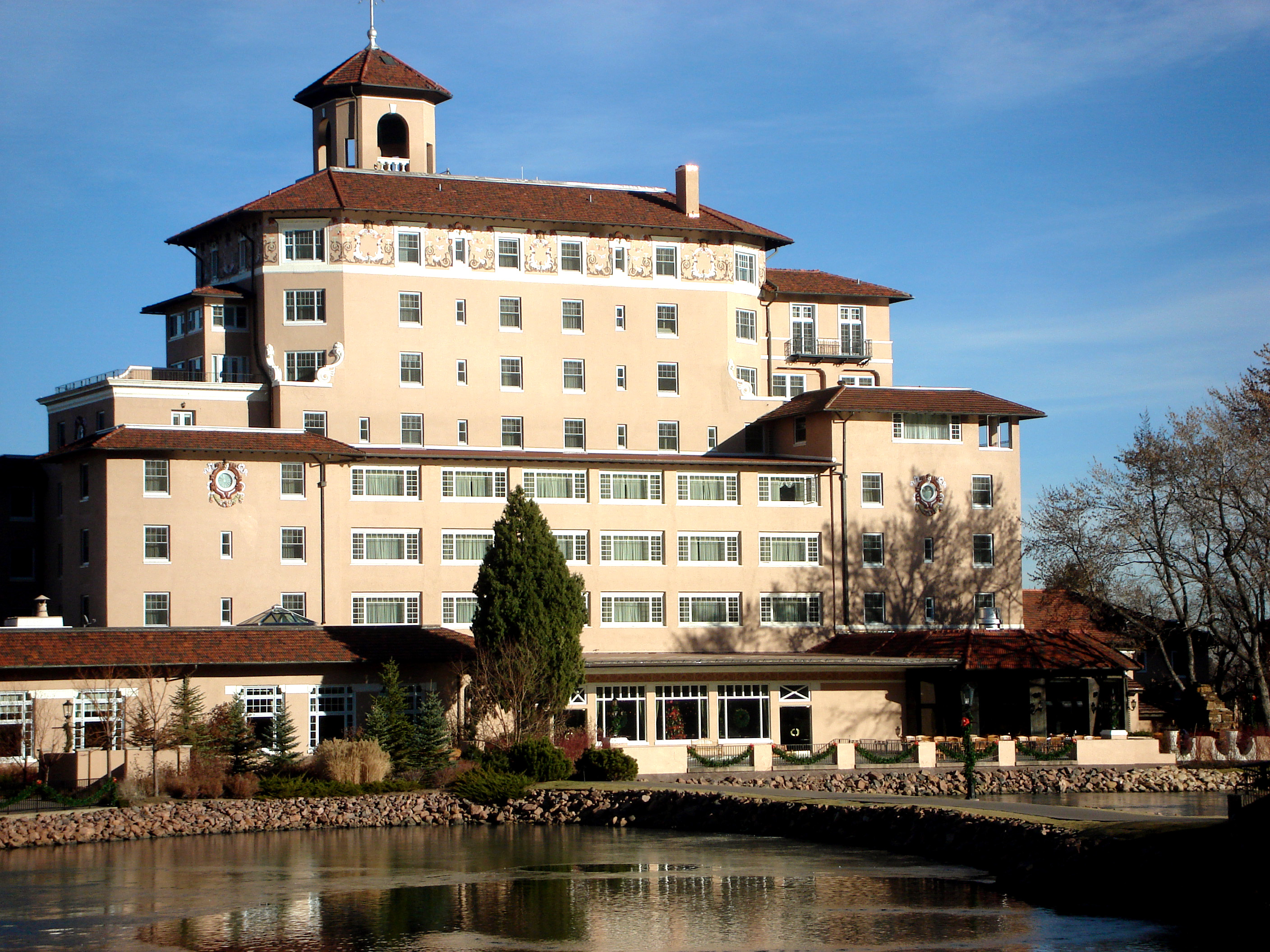
Broadmoor Hotel (1918), Colorado Springs, CO

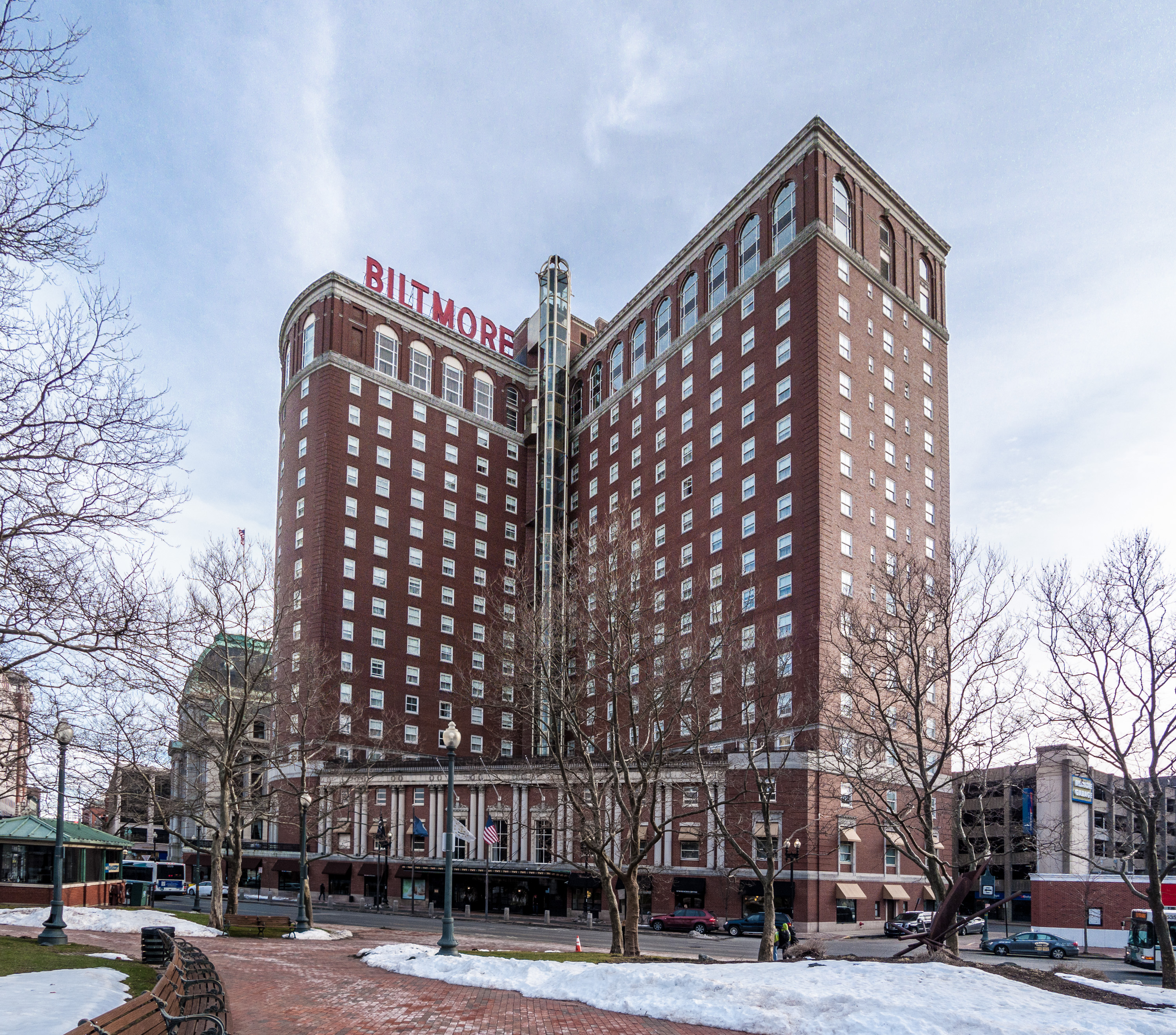
Providence Biltmore (1922), Providence, RI

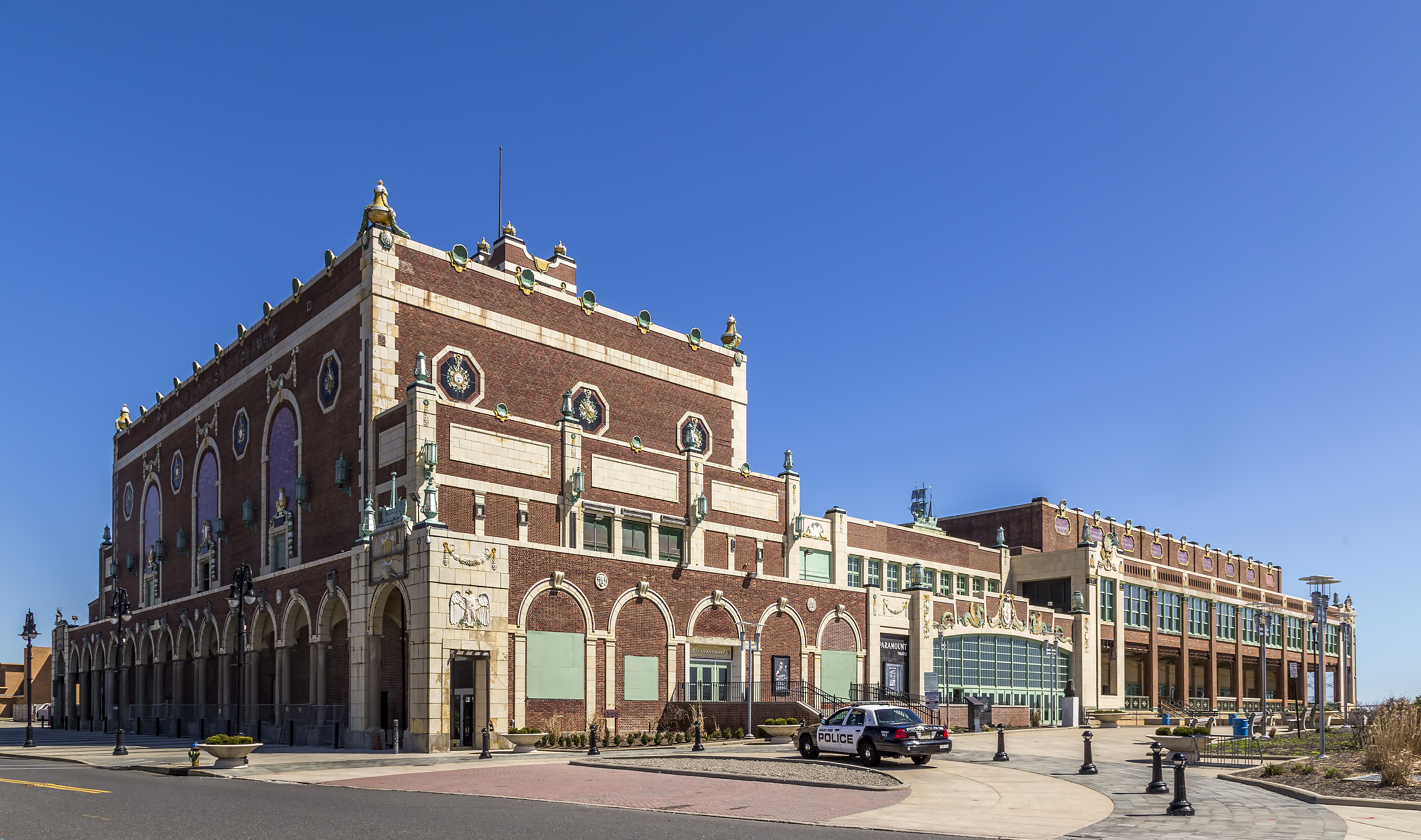
Convention Hall (1923) and Paramount Theatre (1930), Asbury Park, NJ

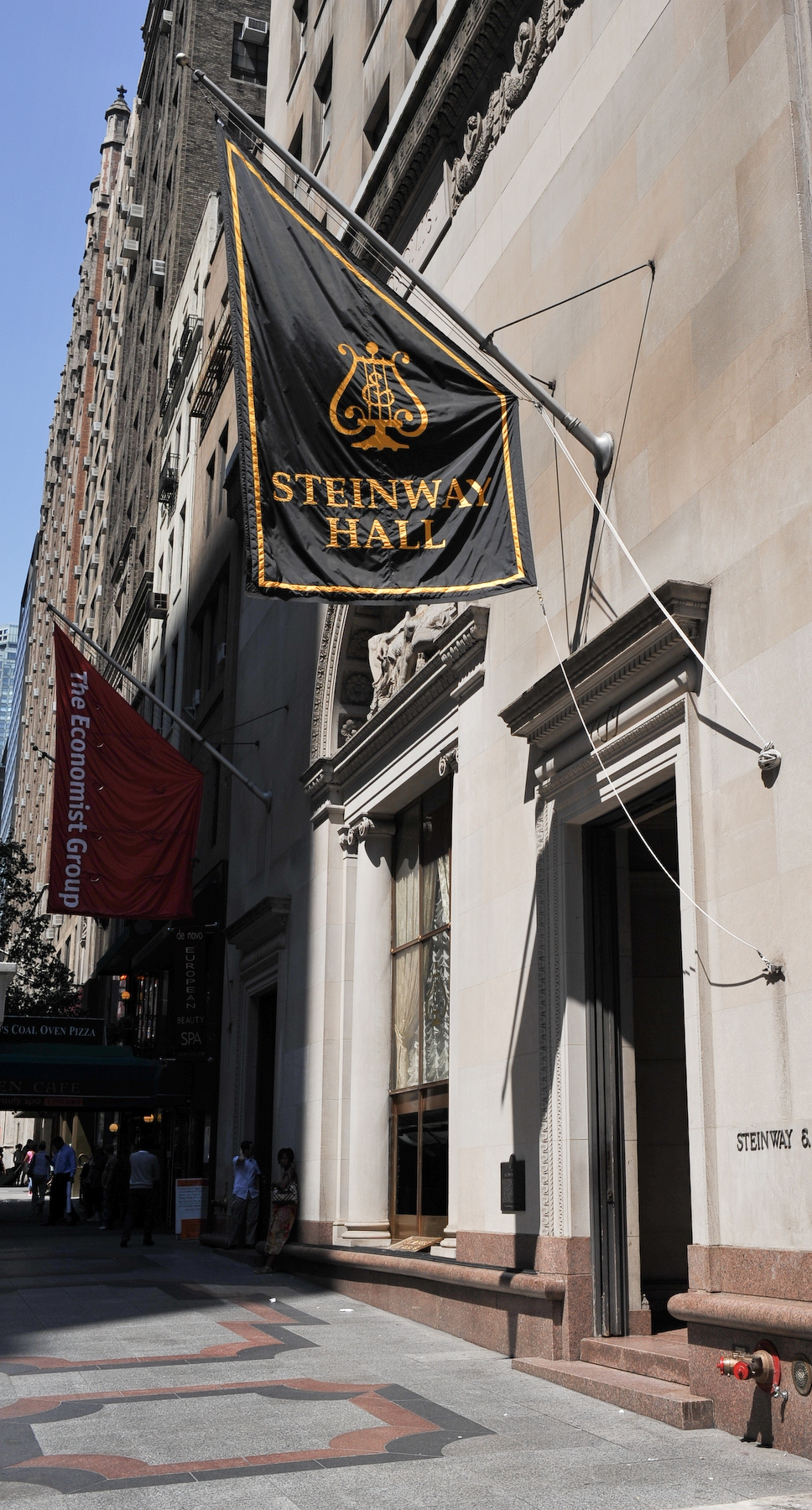
Steinway Hall (1925), New York City

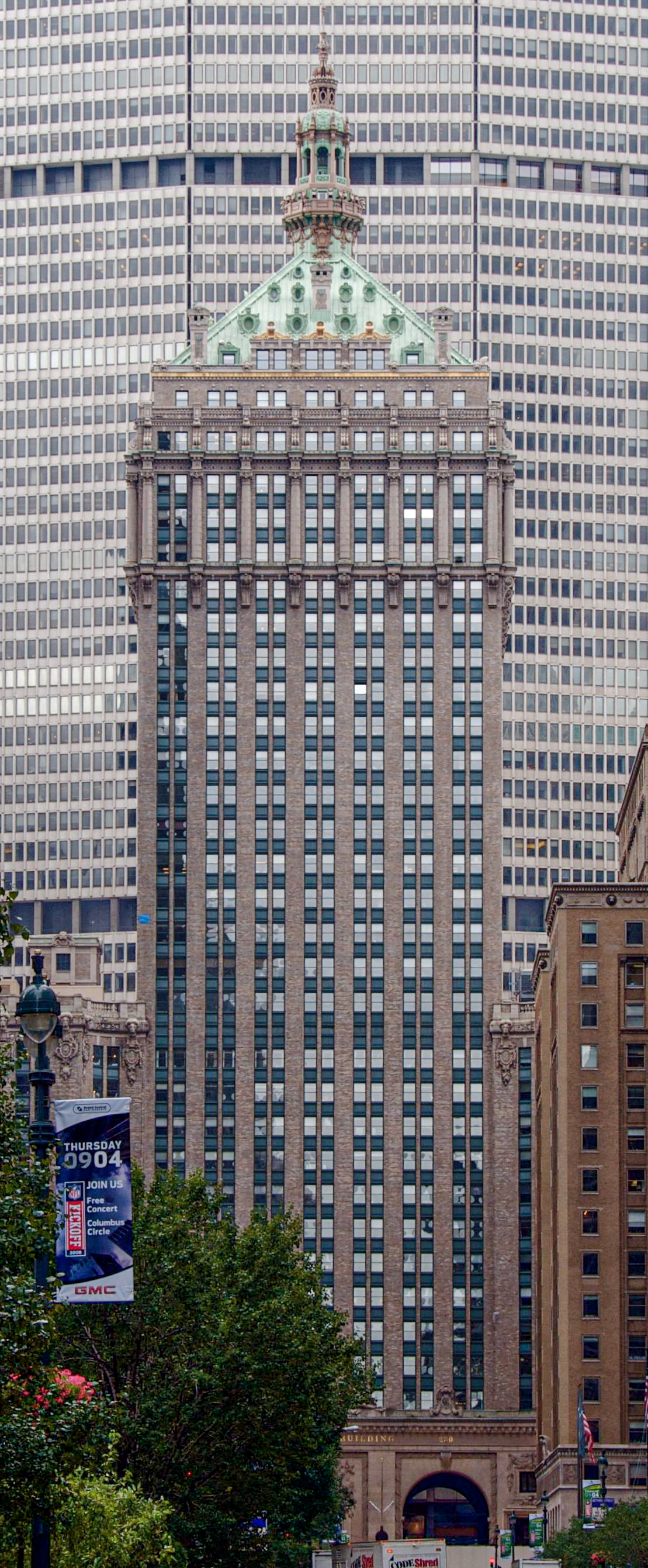
Helmsley Building (1929), New York City, NY

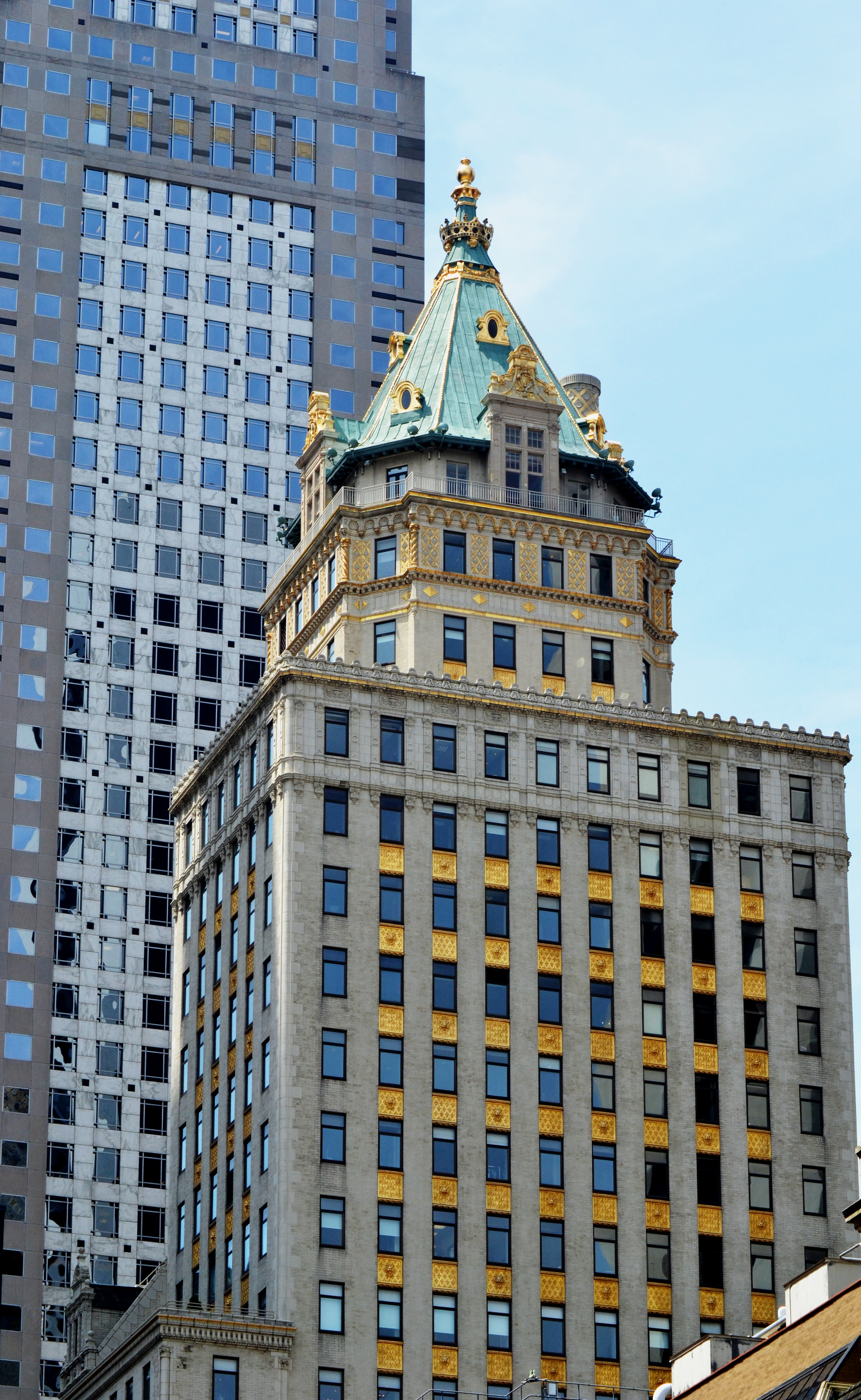
Crown Building (1921), New York City, NY
