= Norwood Gardens =

Planned community in Queens, New York

Coordinates: 40°45′49″N 73°55′7″W

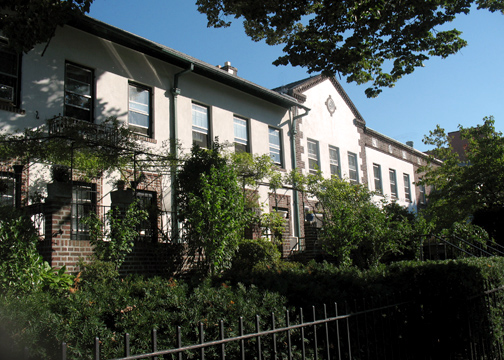
Norwood Gardens terrace homes at 36th Street in Astoria, New York

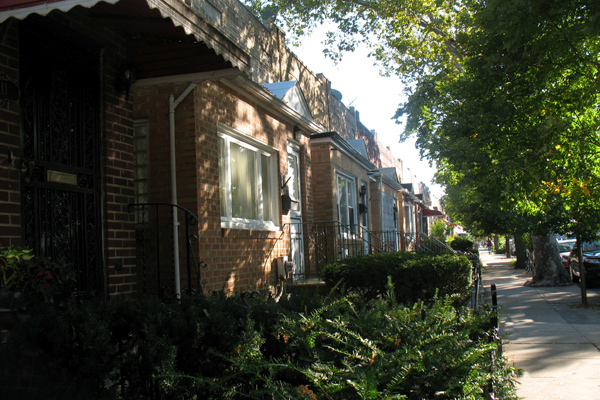
Norwood Gardens attached homes on 37th Street in Astoria, New York

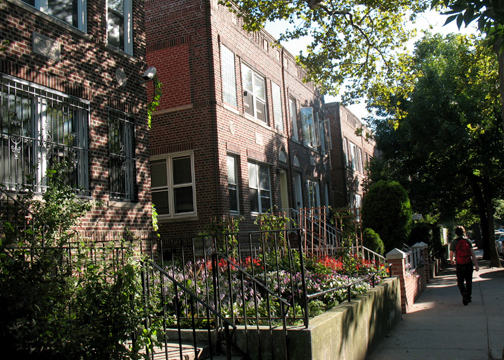
Norwood Gardens two-family garden homes 35th Street in Astoria, New York

Norwood Gardens is a small planned community in Astoria, Queens, bounded by 35th, 36th and 37th Streets between 31st Avenue and 30th Avenue. Norwood Gardens was planned and developed during a period of expansion in New York City.

With the opening of the Queensboro Bridge in 1909 and the extension of the New York City Subway to Astoria–Ditmars Boulevard in 1915, Astoria and Long Island City were forever changed from outlying suburbs to centrally connected communities. The Queens Chamber of Commerce published sales brochures advertising Norwood Gardens as "Country Living In The City". The houses were developed by Rickert Brown and designed to offer middle-income families a better quality of life than that typically found in a large, metropolitan city in the early part of the century.

Norwood Gardens includes many two-family detached homes, a unique block of one-family attached homes east side of 37th Street and thirty unique attached terrace homes on 36th Street. The 36th Street homes were popularly called Doctor’s Row due to doctors combining their practice offices under their living quarters. The 36th Street terrace homes were designed by Walter Hopkins, an architect with Warren & Wetmore, which designed other structures such as Grand Central Terminal. The thirty attached terrace homes showcased 25-foot front gardens planted with California privet hedges, over 22 kinds of evergreens (many 10–12 feet tall) and a large variety of flowering shrubs.

Norwood Gardens’ homes were designed to provide circulating fresh air and sunlight. The interior floor plans maximized use of space, making the homes attractive to families. The exterior design is a lively combination of white stucco and red tapestry brick. The mortar is a mix of bright white lime with a quartz aggregate that sparkles and accentuates the brick. Additional architectural elements include iron balconies, lattice work, green blinds, cement flower pots on the roof, red Italianate tiles, planter supports in the shape of lambs heads and a variety of architectural medallions embedded in the brick.

The original bathroom fixtures were manufactured by J. L. Mott Iron Works of Manhattan; the company's namesake also gave rise to the name of Mott Street in Chinatown, Manhattan. In 1929, Norwood Gardens terrace homes sold for $15,000 and the slightly larger corner homes for $16,000. Metropolitan Life Insurance Company underwrote the mortgages for the terrace homes. Twenty-nine exteriors of the thirty terrace homes remain in near original state.
