= Paramount Theatre (Asbury Park, New Jersey) =

- U.S. Historic district – Contributing property
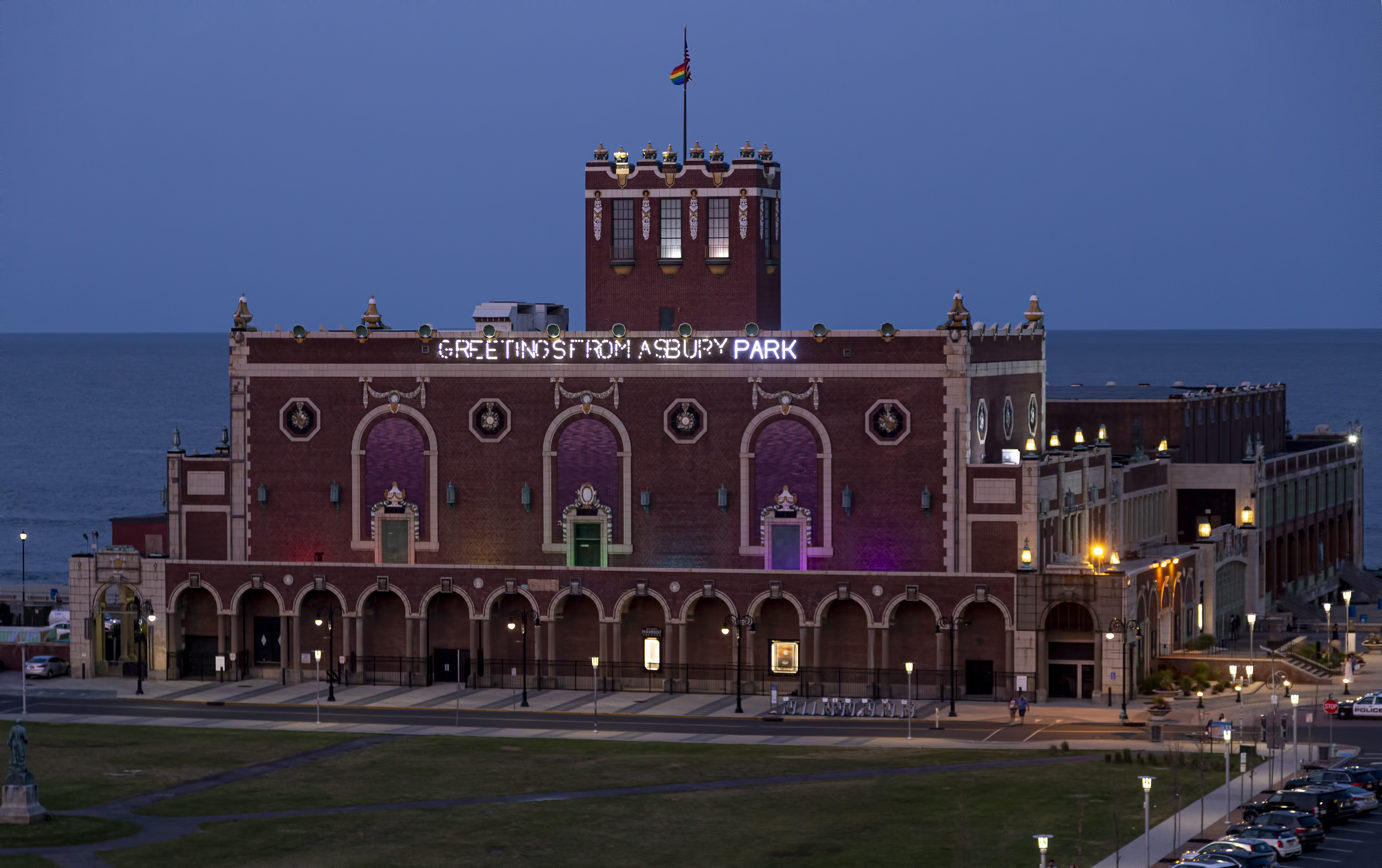
- The Paramount Theatre

- Location within Monmouth County, New Jersey Location within New Jersey Location within the United States
- Location: Ocean Avenue, Asbury Park, New Jersey
- Coordinates: 40°13′25″N 73°59′56″W
- Part of: Asbury Park Convention Hall (ID79001512)
- Added to NRHP: March 2, 1979

The Paramount Theatre in Asbury Park, New Jersey, Monmouth County, New Jersey, United States, is co-located with the Asbury Park Convention Hall on the boardwalk along the Atlantic Ocean. The two are connected by an arcade that spans the boardwalk, and is bordered by the Atlantic Ocean on the east, and Bradley Park on the west. A statue of Asbury Park founder James A. Bradley faces the buildings west facade.

The theatre has undergone recent renovations by Landmark Studio of Pittstown.

== History ==
In 1916, Asbury Park Mayor Clarence E.F. Hetrick hired famed architectural firm McKim, Mead and White to design a convention center for the block just north of the city's Atlantic Square, between 6th and Sunset Avenues. The firm submitted a plan that called for a 5000-seat venue costing $75,000 to construct. However, city founder James A. Bradley owned the block in question, then home to the aging Asbury Park Auditorium, and refused to sell the plot to the city. After Bradley's death in 1921, department store scion Arthur Steinbach purchased the Auditorium property from Bradley's estate, demolished the auditorium, and constructed the Berkeley-Carteret Hotel on the plot.

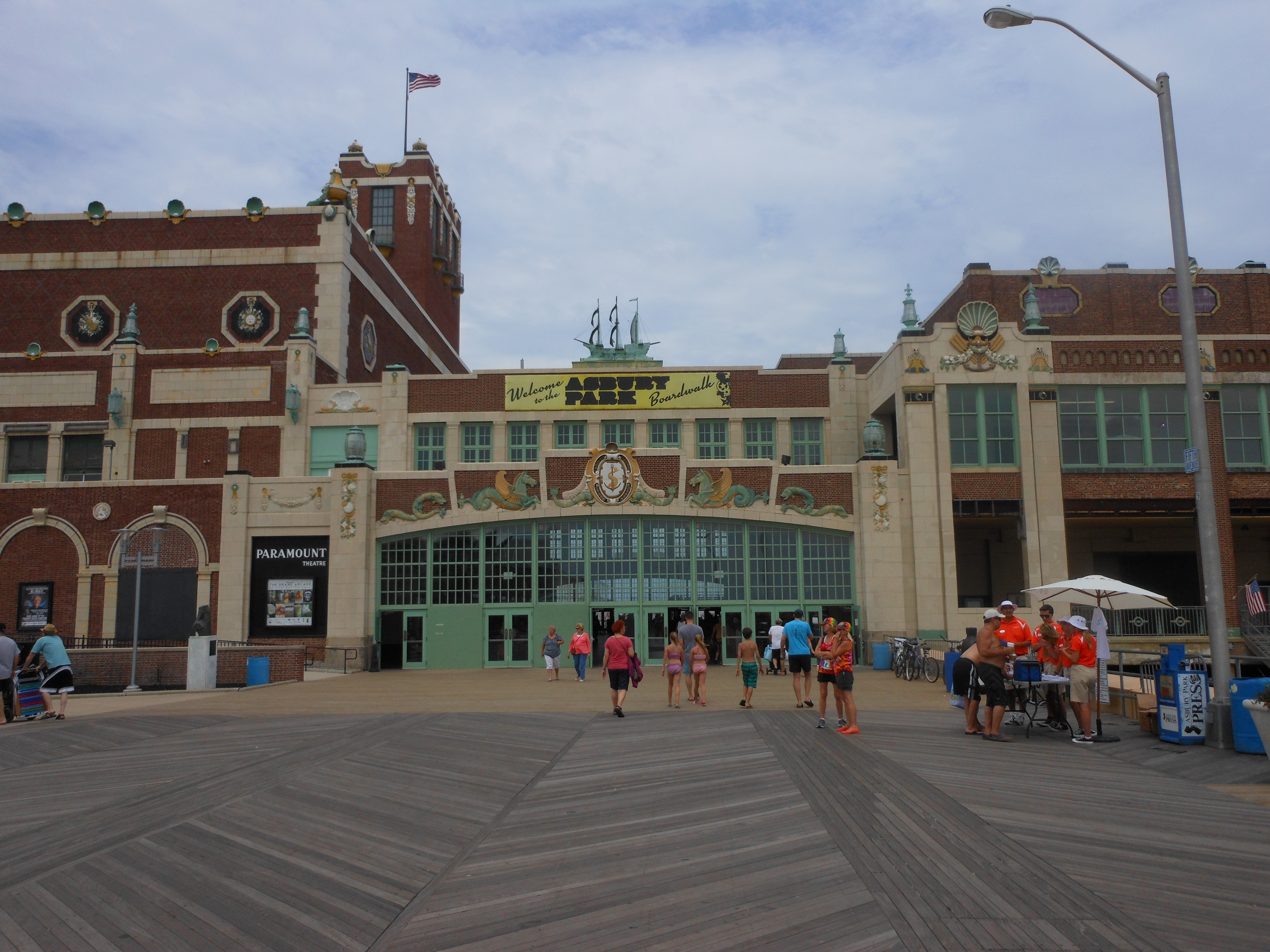
Asbury Park Grand Arcade between Paramount Theatre and Convention Hall.

The completion of the third Madison Square Garden in New York, and the approval of Atlantic City's new Convention Hall, put Hetrick under considerable pressure to construct a similar venue for Asbury Park. "While we have hesitated, Atlantic City has added $100,000,000 in valuations," he told the Asbury Park Press. "While the Traymores and Breakers and other imposing structures have been built over a period of 25 years, we can show only the Monterey, the Berkeley-Carteret, the Asbury-Carlton and the Palace (referring to four then-new seasonal hotels in the resort city)."

In 1927, after a mysterious fire destroyed the 5th Avenue Arcade just east of Atlantic Square on the Boardwalk, voters passed a bond referendum to construct a new convention center on the plot. Hetrick commissioned architects Warren and Wetmore, whose eventual design called for a 1600-seat theatre to occupy the old 5th Avenue Arcade plot. The theatre was connected to an enclosed arcade that covered the boardwalk. This arcade was connected on the east to a 3200-seat convention center. The entire complex was designed in a combination Italian-French style, with an emphasis on nautical themes in recognition of its oceanfront location. The interior of the theatre was dominated by gold, black, and purple, and featured a giant rosette on the ceiling.

Walter Reade, who owned four other theatres in Asbury Park, initially protested the new theatre's construction, saying five theaters were one too many for the town. However, just prior to the theatre's completion, he was given the contract to book movies at the venue. As part of a deal Reade brokered with film distributor Paramount-Famous Players–Lasky, the new theatre was named the Paramount Theatre.

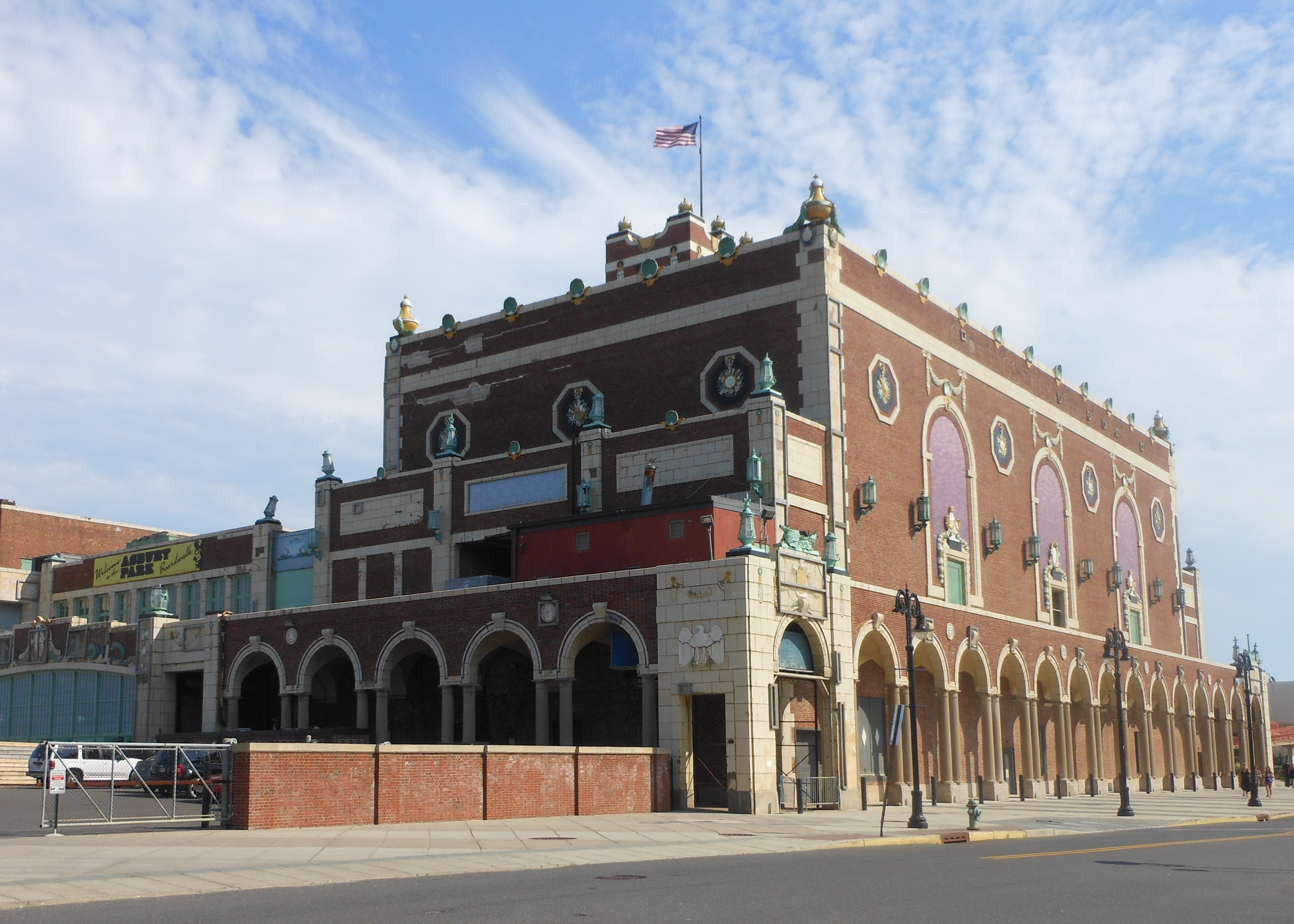
Paramount Theatre Facade

Reade inaugurated cinema at the theatre with a showing of the 1927 film Wings on New Year's Day, 1930. However, he decided to hold a much more spectacular "grand opening" of the theatre on July 11, 1930, with a second showing of Wings. In attendance were Wings leading man Charles "Buddy" Rogers, the Marx Brothers, Ginger Rogers, Ed Wynn, Fredric March, and Carole Lombard. The theatre featured a mix of movies and live performances from 1930 into the 1980s.

The 1,600-seat theatre was placed on the National Register of Historic Places in 1979.

The Premier Theatre Company was the resident theatre company for the Paramount Theatre from 2007 - 2015. Premier has been honored by The United States House of Representatives, New Jersey State Senate and Assembly, The City of Asbury Park, and The Asbury Park Chamber of Commerce for their contributions to the revitalization of the City of Asbury Park.

The theater is also the site for the annual Holy Cross celebration, hosted by the Greek Orthodox Metropolis of New Jersey. The divine liturgy services are held inside the theater, given by all the priests in every single New Jersey Greek Orthodox Church. Then, all members of the New Jersey Greek Orthodox Youth Association (aka GOYA) who are participating in the diving for the cross event go out to the beach and retrieve the cross in the ocean. It is held the third Sunday in September.

== See also ==
- New Jersey music venues by capacity
