= Jersey Shore Roller Derby =

Roller derby league

- Metro area: Toms River, New Jersey
- Country: United States
- Founded: 2007
- Teams: All Stars; Black Heart Beauties; Rum Running Rebels
- Track type: Flat
- Venue: Jackson Roller Magic
- Affiliations: WFTDA
- Website: jerseyshorerollerderby.com

Jersey Shore Roller Derby (JSRD) is a women's flat-track roller derby league based in Toms River, New Jersey. Founded in 2007, it has three intra-league home teams and two travel teams which compete against teams from other leagues. Jersey Shore is a member of the Women's Flat Track Derby Association (WFTDA).

== History ==
Founded after five local women saw the 2006 Rollergirls reality show, by 2009, the league had more than sixty skaters. Each of the league's bouts also raises funds and awareness for a charity.

Jersey Shore was accepted into the Women's Flat Track Derby Association Apprentice Program in October 2010, and became a full member of the WFTDA in September 2011.

== Rankings ==
| Season | Final ranking | Playoffs | Championship |
|---|---|---|---|
| 2011 | 23 E | DNQ | DNQ |
| 2012 | 33 E | DNQ | DNQ |
| 2013 | NR WFTDA | DNQ | DNQ |
| 2014 | 183 WFTDA | DNQ | DNQ |
| 2015 | 238 WFTDA | DNQ | DNQ |
| 2016 | 235 WFTDA | DNQ | DNQ |
| 2017 | 215 WFTDA | DNQ | DNQ |
| 2018 | 328 WFTDA | DNQ | DNQ |
| 2019 | 302 WFTDA | DNQ | DNQ |
