= WOTW =

WOTW may refer to:

- WFYY, a radio station licensed to serve Windermere, Florida, United States, which held the call sign WOTW from 2014 to 2022
- WGEN-FM, a radio station licensed to serve Monee, Illinois, United States, which held the call sign WOTW from 2007 to 2013
- Mirsky's Worst of the Web
- The War of the Worlds (disambiguation)
- Weight of the World (disambiguation)
- Will-o'-the-wisp (disambiguation)
- Window on the World (disambiguation)
- Wonders of the World (disambiguation)
- "WOTW / POTP", a song by Coldplay from their 2019 album Everyday Life
- "Writing on the Walls", a song by Underoath
