= Immortalis (album) =

2007 studio album by Overkill

Studio album by Overkill
- Released: October 9, 2007
- Recorded: October–December 2006, May–June 2007
- Studios: Gear Recording Studio, Shrewsbury, New Jersey
- Genres: Thrash metal; groove metal
- Length: 49:22
- Label: Bodog
- Producer: Overkill

Overkill chronology
| ReliXIV (2005) | Immortalis (2007) | Ironbound (2010) |

Professional ratings
Review scores
| Source | Rating |
|---|---|
| AllMusic | 3.5/5 stars |
| Blabbermouth.net | 7.5/10 stars |

Immortalis is the fourteenth studio album by thrash metal band Overkill. It was released in 2007 on Bodog Records. It is a pun of "Immortal15", and was preceded by Killbox 13 and ReliXIV (with the Roman XIV for 14). The album sold over 2,800 copies in its first week of release in the U.S and as of 2009, Immortalis sold over 15,000 copies in the U.S.

This was also the first Overkill studio album to include drummer Ron Lipnicki, who joined the band shortly after the release of its predecessor ReliXIV (2005).

== Track listing ==
All music is composed by D.D. Verni and Bobby 'Blitz' Ellsworth.

| No. | Title | Length |
|---|---|---|
| 1. | "Devils in the Mist" | 4:34 |
| 2. | "What It Takes" | 4:28 |
| 3. | "Skull and Bones" (featuring Randy Blythe from Lamb of God) | 5:54 |
| 4. | "Shadow of a Doubt" | 4:51 |
| 5. | "Hellish Pride" | 5:16 |
| 6. | "Walk Through Fire" | 4:08 |
| 7. | "Head On" | 5:21 |
| 8. | "Charlie Get Your Gun" | 4:28 |
| 9. | "Hell Is" | 4:40 |
| 10. | "Overkill V... The Brand" | 5:36 |
| Total length: | | 49:22 |

=== Asian bonus track ===
| No. | Title | Length |
|---|---|---|
| 1. | "Old School (Live)" | 3:37 |
| Total length: | | 52:59 |

=== Bonus CD/DVD version ===
| No. | Title | Length |
|---|---|---|
| 1. | "Within Your Eyes (Live)" | 6:43 |
| 2. | "Nice Day For a Funeral (Live)" | 6:00 |
| 3. | "Blood and Iron (Live)" | 3:06 |
| Total length: | | 65:11 |

== Credits ==
- Bobby "Blitz" Ellsworth - lead vocals
- D.D. Verni - bass, backing vocals
- Dave Linsk - lead guitar
- Derek Tailer - rhythm guitar
- Ron Lipnicki - drums

== Additional personnel ==
- Randy Blythe - vocals on "Skull and Bones"
- Bodog Music

== Charts ==
| Chart (2007) | Peak position |
|---|---|
| Billboard Top Heatseekers | 9 |
| Top Independent Albums | 33 |
