= Weight of the World =

The Weight of the World is an expression denoting the burdens of life. It may refer to:

== Television ==
- "The Weight of the World" (Buffy the Vampire Slayer), from the fifth season of the series Buffy the Vampire Slayer
- "Weight of the World" (The 4400), from the second season of the series The 4400

== Music ==
=== Albums ===
- The Weight of the World (The Beautiful Girls album), 2004
- Weight of the World (Harem Scarem album), 2002
- The Weight of the World (Metal Church album), 2004
- Weight of the World (This Is Hell album), 2010
- Weight of the World, a 2006 album and song by The Jimmy Swift Band
- Weight of the World, a 2020 album by Mike

=== Songs ===
- "Weight of the World" (Elton John song), 2004
- "Weight of the World" (Evanescence song), 2006
- "Weight of the World" (Lemar song), 2008
- "Weight of the World" (Ringo Starr song), 1992
- "Weight of the World" (Smilo song), 2016
- "Weight of the World" (Young Guns song), 2010
- "Weight of the World", by Black Rebel Motorcycle Club from Howl, 2005
- "Weight of the World", by Blue October from Approaching Normal, 2009
- "Weight of the World", by Chantal Kreviazuk from What If It All Means Something, 2002
- "Weight of the World", by Converge from No Heroes, 2006
- "Weight of the World", by Crown the Empire from Retrograde, 2016
- "The Weight of the World", by Editors from An End Has a Start, 2007
- "Weight of the World", by Erasure from The Innocents, 1988
- "Weight of the World", by Framing Hanley from A Promise to Burn, 2010
- "Weight of the World", by Good Riddance from A Comprehensive Guide to Moderne Rebellion, 1996
- "The Weight of the World", by Joe Satriani from Unstoppable Momentum, 2013
- "Weight of the World", by Jughead's Revenge from Just Joined, 1998
- "Weight of the World", by Keiichi Okabe from Nier: Automata Original Soundtrack, 2017
- "Weight of the World", by Misery Signals from Controller, 2008
- "Weight of the World", by Neil Young from Landing on Water, 1986
- "Weight of the World", by Overkill from I Hear Black, 1993
- "Weight of the World", by Pigeon John from And the Summertime Pool Party, 2006
- "Weight of the World", by Saliva Back into Your System, 2002
- "Weight of the World", by The Samples from Autopilot, 1994
- "Weight of the World", by Shadows Fall from Fire from the Sky, 2012
- "Weight of the World", by Tarkio from Sea Songs for Landlocked Sailors, 1999
- "Weight of the World", by Throwdown from Venom & Tears, 2007
- "Weight of the World", by Widespread Panic from Widespread Panic, 1991

== Literature ==
- The Weight of the World (book), a 1977 book by Peter Handke

== See also ==
- Weltschmerz
- Human condition
- Mass of the Earth, estimated at M_{🜨} = 5.9722×10^{24} kg.
