= ReliXIV =

Studio album by Overkill
- Released: March 22, 2005
- Recorded: October–November 2004
- Studio: Gear Recording Studio, Shrewsbury, New Jersey
- Genre: Thrash metal, groove metal
- Length: 50:39
- Label: Spitfire
- Producer: Overkill

Overkill chronology
Killbox 13 (2003)	ReliXIV (2005)	Immortalis (2007)

Professional ratings
Review scores
Source	Rating
AllMusic	3.5/5 stars

ReliXIV is the thirteenth studio album by thrash metal band Overkill, released in spring 2005. The reason the Roman numeral 14 is included in the title is because the band includes the Overkill EP in their lineup of studio albums, which would make this album the 14th by their chronology. It can also be because Overkill released the covers album Coverkill, which would have been their eleventh studio album. While this diction left it unclear how the title was to be pronounced, Blitz just mentioned it as "Relics" when announcing songs from the album on stage.

The album produced the popular track "Old School", which has been played at every Overkill show since it was first released. As of late 2007, ReliXIV sold over 16,000 copies in the U.S.

== Track listing ==
All music is composed by D.D. Verni and Bobby "Blitz" Ellsworth.

No.	Title	Length
1.	"Within Your Eyes"	6:06
2.	"Love"	5:40
3.	"Loaded Rack"	4:43
4.	"Bats in the Belfry"	4:47
5.	"A Pound of Flesh"	3:37
6.	"Keeper"	5:12
7.	"Wheelz"	5:10
8.	"The Mark"	5:54
9.	"Play the Ace"	5:34
10.	"Old School"	3:51
Total length:		50:39

Japanese bonus track
No.	Title	Length
1.	"Coma (Live at Club Citta 2004)"	4:55
Total length:		55:34

== Personnel ==
- Bobby "Blitz" Ellsworth – lead vocals
- D.D. Verni – bass, backing vocals
- Dave Linsk – lead guitar
- Derek Tailer – rhythm guitar
- Tim Mallare – drums

Production

- Produced by Overkill
- Presented by Eddie Trunk on "Old School"
- Mixed by John D'Uva and Overkill
- Engineered by D.D. Verni, Dave Linsk, and Dave Manheimer
- Mastered by Roger Lian at Masterdisk, New York City
