= Feel the Fire (Overkill album) =

1985 studio album by Overkill

Studio album by Overkill
- Released: October 15, 1985
- Recorded: 1985
- Studio: Pyramid (Ithaca, New York)
- Genre: Thrash metal
- Length: 40:14
- Label: Megaforce
- Producer: Carl Canedy

Overkill chronology
Overkill (EP) (1985)	Feel the Fire (1985)	Taking Over (1987)

Feel the Fire is the debut studio album by American thrash metal band Overkill, released on October 15, 1985 through Megaforce Records.

== Overview ==
The final track, "Sonic Reducer", is a cover of a 1977 song by punk rock band Dead Boys; it was not included on the vinyl or cassette versions of the album, and on some CD reissues it was instead placed between "Second Son" and "Hammerhead". "Rotten to the Core" has been a mainstay of the band's live setlist since 1984.

== Reception ==
Professional ratings
Review scores
Source	Rating
AllMusic	3/5 stars

Feel the Fire received a positive review from AllMusic's Alex Henderson, who awarded the album three stars out of five, saying that it "made quite a splash within the heavy metal community and listenership", and "possessed all the blistering riffs and complete abandonment fans would learn to expect from Overkill." Henderson then finished his review, saying that Feel the Fire "solidified a loyal fan base that would grow steadily as the band expanded their sound and catalog through the mid- and late '80s. The classic original band lineup of Bobby "Blitz" Ellsworth on vocals, Bobby Gustafson on guitars, Rat Skates on drums, and bassist D.D. Verni sounds surprisingly accomplished on this major-label debut, giving tight performances and ultimately helping (along with fellow second-wave thrash bands like Flotsam and Jetsam and a myriad of Bay-Area metal outfits) define a generation of spastic, but impressive second wave of aggressive thrash metal."

Feel the Fire did not initially reach the Billboard 200 charts or become a commercial success. Based on the moderate success of Feel the Fire, Overkill signed a recording contract with Atlantic Records in 1986, although they would still remain on Megaforce until Horrorscope (1991).

== Touring and promotion ==
Overkill spent most of 1985 and 1986 on tour for Feel the Fire, supported by bands such as Carnivore, S.O.D., Blessed Death, Nuclear Assault, Liege Lord and D.R.I. In 1986, Overkill was part of two major tours; they supported Anthrax on the Spreading the Disease tour in Europe, and opened for Slayer on the Reign in Blood tour in the United States.

== Track listing ==
All tracks are written by Overkill, except where noted.

No.	Title	Length
1.	"Raise the Dead"	4:18
2.	"Rotten to the Core"	5:00
3.	"There's No Tomorrow"	3:23
4.	"Second Son"	3:54
5.	"Hammerhead"	4:01
6.	"Feel the Fire"	5:52
7.	"Blood and Iron"	2:40
8.	"Kill at Command"	4:48
9.	"Overkill"	3:27
10.	"Sonic Reducer" (David Thomas, Cheetah Chrome)	2:51
Total length:		40:14

== Personnel ==
- Bobby "Blitz" Ellsworth – vocals
- D. D. Verni – bass
- Bobby Gustafson – guitars
- Rat Skates – drums

Technical

- Overkill – arrangements
- Carl Canedy – production
- Alex Perialas – engineering
- George Marino – mastering
- Jon Zazula – executive production
- Marsha Zazula, The Music Connection – project coordination
