= Fuck You and Then Some =

1996 reissue of the Overkill EPs Overkill (1985) and !!!Fuck You!!!

Compilation album by Overkill
- Released: October 22, 1996
- Recorded: October–November 1984, June 3, 1987, January 27, 1990
- Genre: Thrash metal
- Length: 58:31
- Label: Megaforce

Overkill chronology
The Killing Kind (1996)	Fuck You and Then Some (1996)	From the Underground and Below (1997)

Professional ratings
Review scores
Source	Rating
AllMusic	link

Fuck You and Then Some (stylized as !!!Fuck You!!! and Then Some) is a 1996 reissue of the Overkill EPs Overkill (1985) and !!!Fuck You!!! (1987), combined with bonus live tracks, including a cover of Black Sabbath's "Hole in the Sky". The cover of this compilation album is the same as !!!Fuck You!!! with the addition of "And Then Some" to the title.

== Track listing ==
No.	Title	Writer(s)	Length
1.	"Fuck You" (The Subhumans cover)	Gerry Useless	2:20
2.	"Rotten to the Core" (live)		6:41
3.	"Hammerhead" (live)		3:57
4.	"Use Your Head" (live)		5:18
5.	"Electro-Violence" (live)		3:50
6.	"Fuck You" (live)		2:28
7.	"Hole in the Sky" (live, Black Sabbath cover)		3:42
8.	"E.vil N.ever D.ies" (live)		6:11
9.	"Rotten to the Core"		5:14
10.	"Fatal If Swallowed"		6:20
11.	"The Answer"		8:49
12.	"Overkill"		3:41
Total length:			58:31

== Personnel ==
- Bobby "Blitz" Ellsworth – vocals
- D.D. Verni – bass
- Bobby Gustafson – guitars
- Rat Skates – drums (tracks 1–6, 9–12)
- Sid Falck – drums (tracks 7–8)
