= Lenovo Center =

Indoor arena in Raleigh, North Carolina

- The Loudest House in the NHL; The Lenny

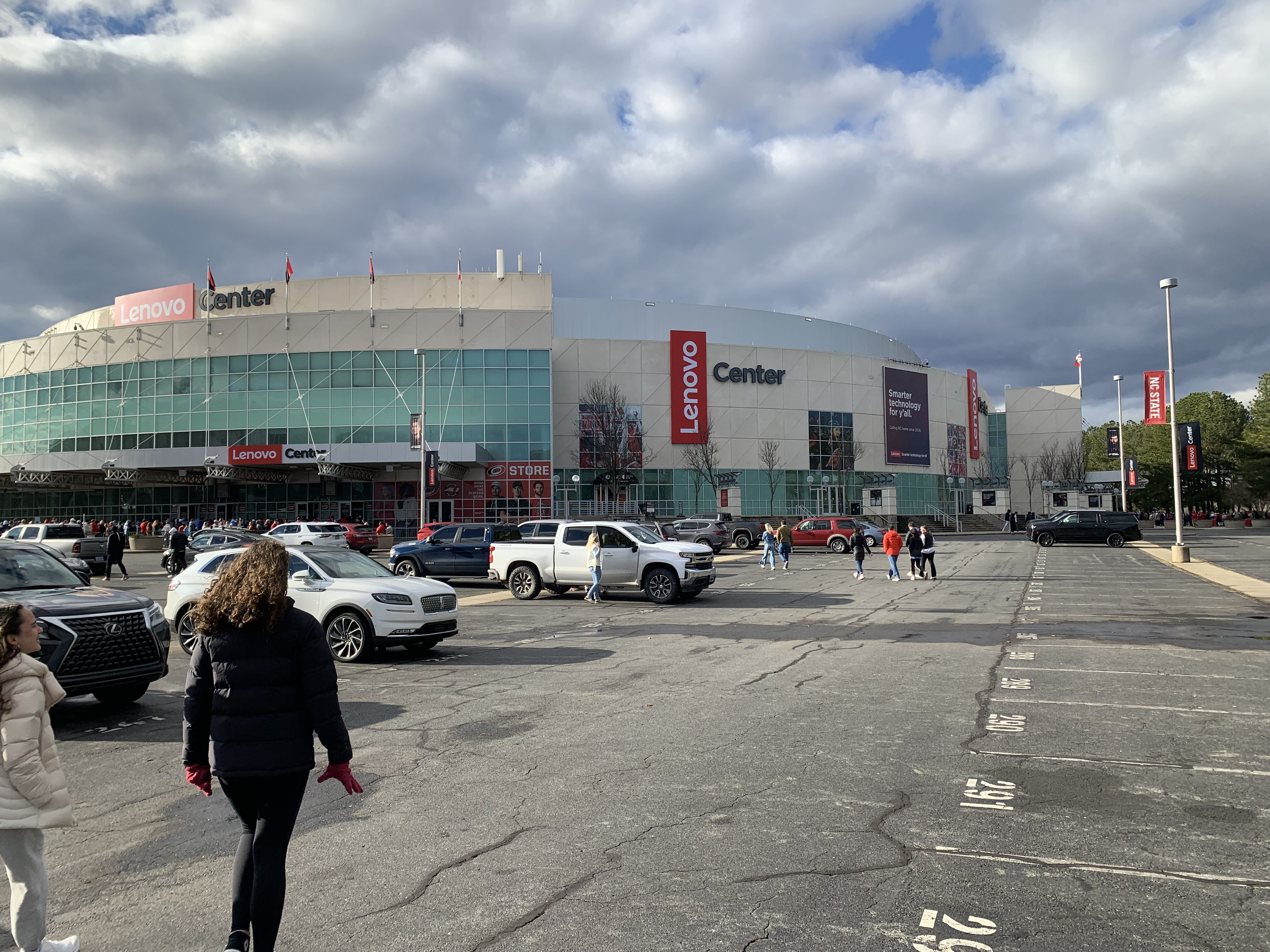

- Location in North Carolina Location in the United States
- Former names: Raleigh Entertainment & Sports Arena (1999–2002); RBC Center (2002–2012); PNC Arena (2012–2024)
- Address: 1400 Edwards Mill Road
- Location: Raleigh, North Carolina, U.S.
- Coordinates: 35°48′12″N 78°43′19″W
- Owner: Centennial Authority
- Operator: Hurricanes Holdings, LLC
- Capacity: Basketball: 19,772 (1999–2025); 19,119 (2025–2026); 19,367 (2026–present); Concerts: 20,000; Ice hockey: 18,730 (1999–2006); 18,639 (2006–2007); 18,680 (2007–2023); 18,700 (2023–2025); 18,299 (2025–2026); 18,547 (2026–present); Theatre: 4,000–10,000
- Surface: Multi-surface
- Scoreboard: 4,000 sq ft (370 m^{2})
- Record attendance: Ice hockey: 19,513 (May 14, 2022); Basketball: 19,722 (January 11, 2015); Concert: 20,052 (January 28, 2019)
- Field size: 700,000 sq ft (65,000 m^{2})
- Public transit: GoRaleigh: Route 27L; GoCary: Route 2; GoTriangle: Route 100; Wolfline: Route 60 & Red Terror
- Parking: 8,000

Construction
- Groundbreaking: July 22, 1997
- Opened: October 29, 1999
- Renovated: 2003, 2008–09, 2018, 2025
- Cost: $158 million ($305 million in 2025, adjusted for inflation.)
- Architect: Odell Associates, Inc.
- Project manager: McDevitt Street Bovis, Inc.
- Structural engineer: Geiger Engineers
- General contractor: Hensel Phelps Construction Co.

Tenants
- Carolina Hurricanes (NHL) (1999–present); NC State Wolfpack (ACC) (1999–present); Governor's Cup (ACHA) (2015–present); Carolina Cobras (AFL) (2000–2002)

Website
- lenovocenter.com

Lenovo Center is an indoor arena located in Raleigh, North Carolina, United States. The arena seats 18,547 for ice hockey and 19,367 for basketball, including 61 suites, 13 luxury boxes and 2,045 club level seats. The building has three concourses and a 300-seat restaurant.

Lenovo Center is home to the two-time Stanley Cup champion Carolina Hurricanes of the National Hockey League and the two-time national champion men's basketball program of North Carolina State University. The arena neighbors Carter–Finley Stadium, home of the North Carolina State University football team and the North Carolina State Fairgrounds. The arena also hosted the Carolina Cobras of the Arena Football League from 2000 to 2002. It is the fourth-largest arena in the ACC (after the JMA Wireless Dome, KFC Yum! Center and the Dean Smith Center) and the eighth-largest arena in the NCAA.

The arena opened in 1999 at an estimated construction cost of $158 million. Taxpayers covered half of the construction cost while the team paid the other half. In 2023, the Hurricanes signed an agreement with local government to lease the arena for 20 years in exchange for $300 million in public subsidies for renovations to the arena. As part of the deal, Hurricanes billionaire owner Tom Dundon said he would develop surrounding vacant land into an $800 million mixed-use development.

== History ==
The idea of a new basketball arena to replace the Wolfpack's longtime home, Reynolds Coliseum, first emerged in the 1980s under the vision of then-Wolfpack coach Jim Valvano. In 1989, the NCSU trustees approved plans to build a 23,000-seat arena. The Centennial Authority was created by the North Carolina General Assembly in 1995 as the governing entity of the arena, then financed by state appropriation, local contributions, and university fundraising. The Centennial Authority refocused the project into a multi-use arena, leading to the 1997 relocation agreement of the then-Hartford Whalers, who would become the Carolina Hurricanes. Construction began that year and was completed in 1999 with an estimated cost of $158 million, which was largely publicly financed by a hotel and restaurant tax. The Hurricanes agreed to pay $60 million of the cost, and the state of North Carolina paid $18 million. As part of the deal, the Hurricanes assumed operational control of the arena.

Known as the Raleigh Entertainment and Sports Arena (ESA) from 1999 to 2002, it was renamed the RBC Center after an extended search for a corporate sponsor. RBC Bank, the US division of the Royal Bank of Canada (whose headquarters were in Raleigh), acquired 20-year naming rights for a reported $80 million. On June 19, 2011, it was announced that PNC Financial Services bought US assets of RBC Bank and acquired the naming rights to the arena pending approval by the regulatory agencies. On December 15, 2011, the Centennial Authority, the landlord of the arena, approved a name change for the facility to PNC Arena.

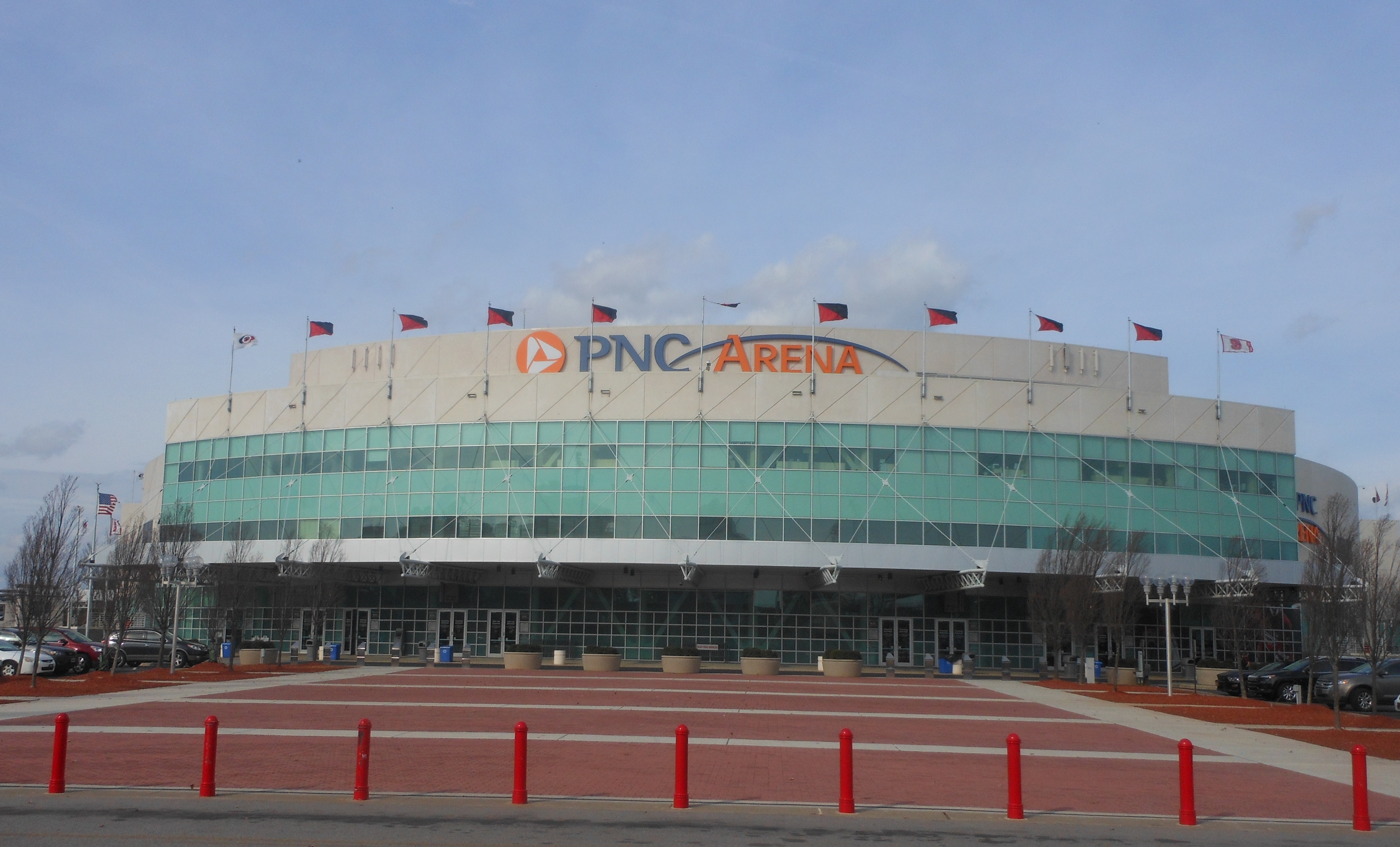
Lenovo Center (as PNC Arena) in 2013

The name change officially took place on March 15, 2012. PNC's naming rights expired on August 31, 2024. On September 12, 2024, the Centennial Authority approved a name change to Lenovo Center after the Chinese technology company Lenovo, whose American headquarters are based in nearby Morrisville, secured naming rights for ten years. On a normal hockey day, Lenovo Center has more than 400 people on duty for security and concessions.

Logo as PNC Arena

The arena has also seen use in fictional media, in The CW series One Tree Hill. The season four episode, "Some You Give Away", saw the Tree Hill High School Ravens playing a NCHSAA championship game in the venue. It was also the taping site for the 2005 Jeopardy! College Tournament.

=== Hockey ===
Raleigh experienced its first NHL game on October 29, 1999, when the Hurricanes hosted the New Jersey Devils on the building's opening night. The first playoff series at the Entertainment and Sports Arena were held in 2001 when the Hurricanes hosted the Devils in games 3, 4, and 6, of the 2001 Stanley Cup playoffs, but the Hurricanes lost in 6. The ESA (by then the renamed RBC Center) hosted games of both the 2002 Stanley Cup playoffs and Stanley Cup Final; however, the Hurricanes lost in the Stanley Cup Final. On June 19, 2006, the Hurricanes were on home ice for a decisive game seven of the Stanley Cup Final, defeating the Edmonton Oilers 3–1 to bring the franchise its first Stanley Cup and North Carolina its first major professional sports championship. The arena hosted the playoffs again in 2009, with the Hurricanes losing in the Eastern Conference Finals. In 2019, the arena hosted the Stanley Cup playoffs for the first time in 10 years, with fans setting a single-game record attendance of 19,495 in game 4 of the second round versus the New York Islanders. This record would be further extended on May 14, 2022, when the Hurricanes defeated the Boston Bruins 3–2 in game 7 of the first round, to advance to the Second Round, in front of 19,513 fans. The arena hosted the 2026 Stanley Cup Final, its third in arena history and while the Hurricanes did win their second Stanley Cup that year, they did so on the road.

On March 7, 2025, the arena hosted a PWHL Takeover Tour game between the Minnesota Frost and Ottawa Charge of the Professional Women's Hockey League during the 2024–25 PWHL season. The Frost won 5–0 in front of 10,782 fans. The PWHL returned on February 6, 2027 for a game between the San Jose Sea Lions and the Minnesota Frost.

==== Top attended Hurricanes games at the Lenovo Center ====
Attendance numbers come from press numbers from ESPN, Lenovo Center, the Raleigh News and Observer, as well as Hockey Reference.com. Numbers in italics represent playoff games.

Date	Opponent	Result	Attendance	Rank
May 14, 2022	Boston Bruins	W (3–2)	19,513	1
May 3, 2019	New York Islanders	W (5–2)	19,495	2
May 20, 2022	New York Rangers	W (2–0)	19,332	3
April 18, 2019	Washington Capitals	W (2–1)	19,202	4
May 10, 2025	Washington Capitals	W (4–0)	19,174	5
May 10, 2022	Boston Bruins	W (5–1)	19,163	6
May 12, 2025	Washington Capitals	W (5–2)	19,138	7
May 16, 2024	New York Rangers	L (5–3)	19,124	8
May 11, 2024	New York Rangers	W (4–3)	19,074	9
May 1, 2019	New York Islanders	W (5–2)	19,066	10
May 16, 2019	Boston Bruins	L (4–0)	19,041	11
March 4, 2022	Pittsburgh Penguins	W (3–2)	19,023	12
February 10, 2024	New Jersey Devils	W (1–0)	18,997	13
June 8, 2002	Detroit Red Wings	OTL (2–3)	18,982	14
June 19, 2006	Edmonton Oilers	W (3–1)	18,978	15

== Renovations ==
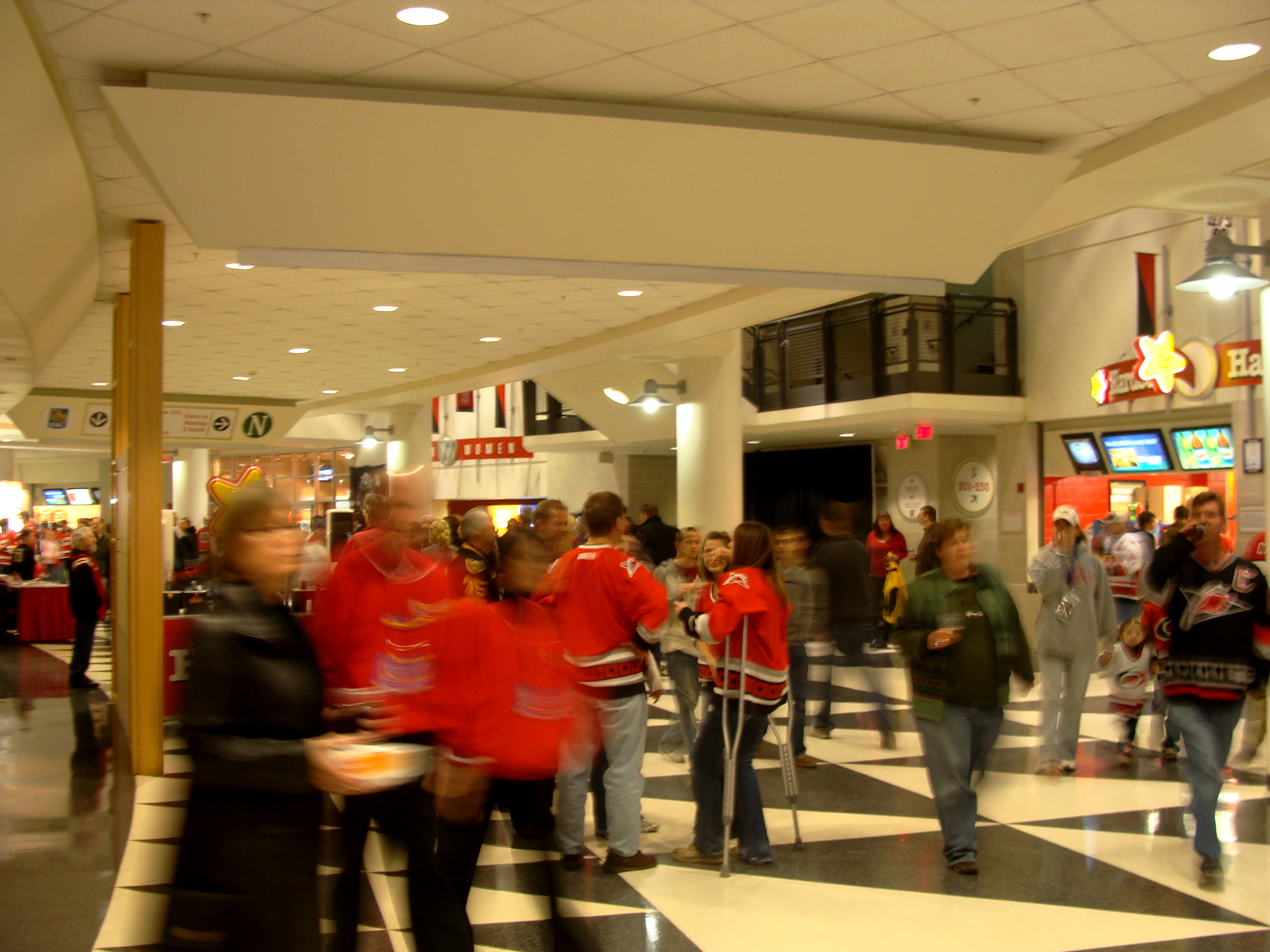
One of the main concourses inside the RBC Center during a Hurricanes game in 2009

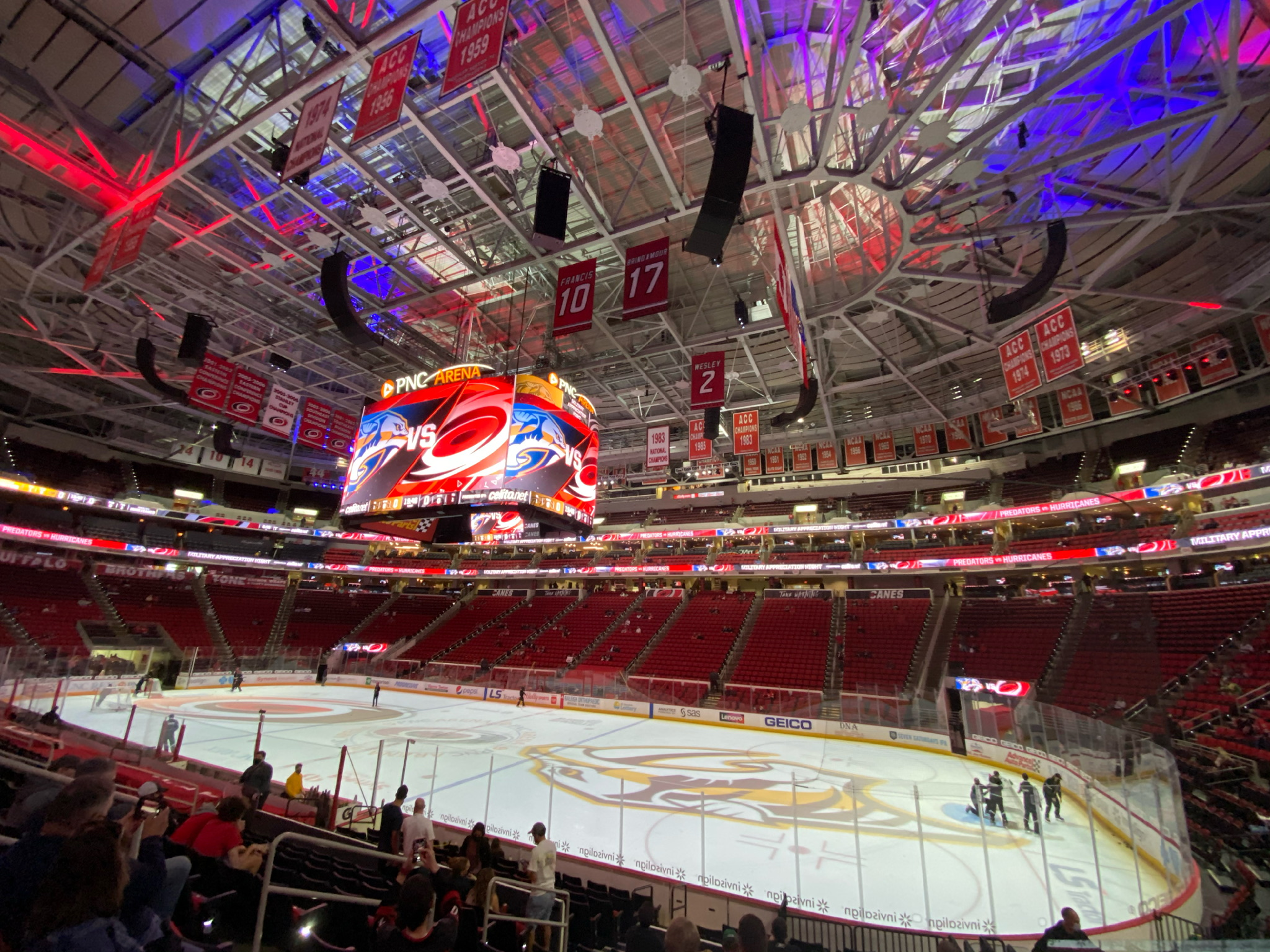
A Carolina Hurricanes Game in 2021

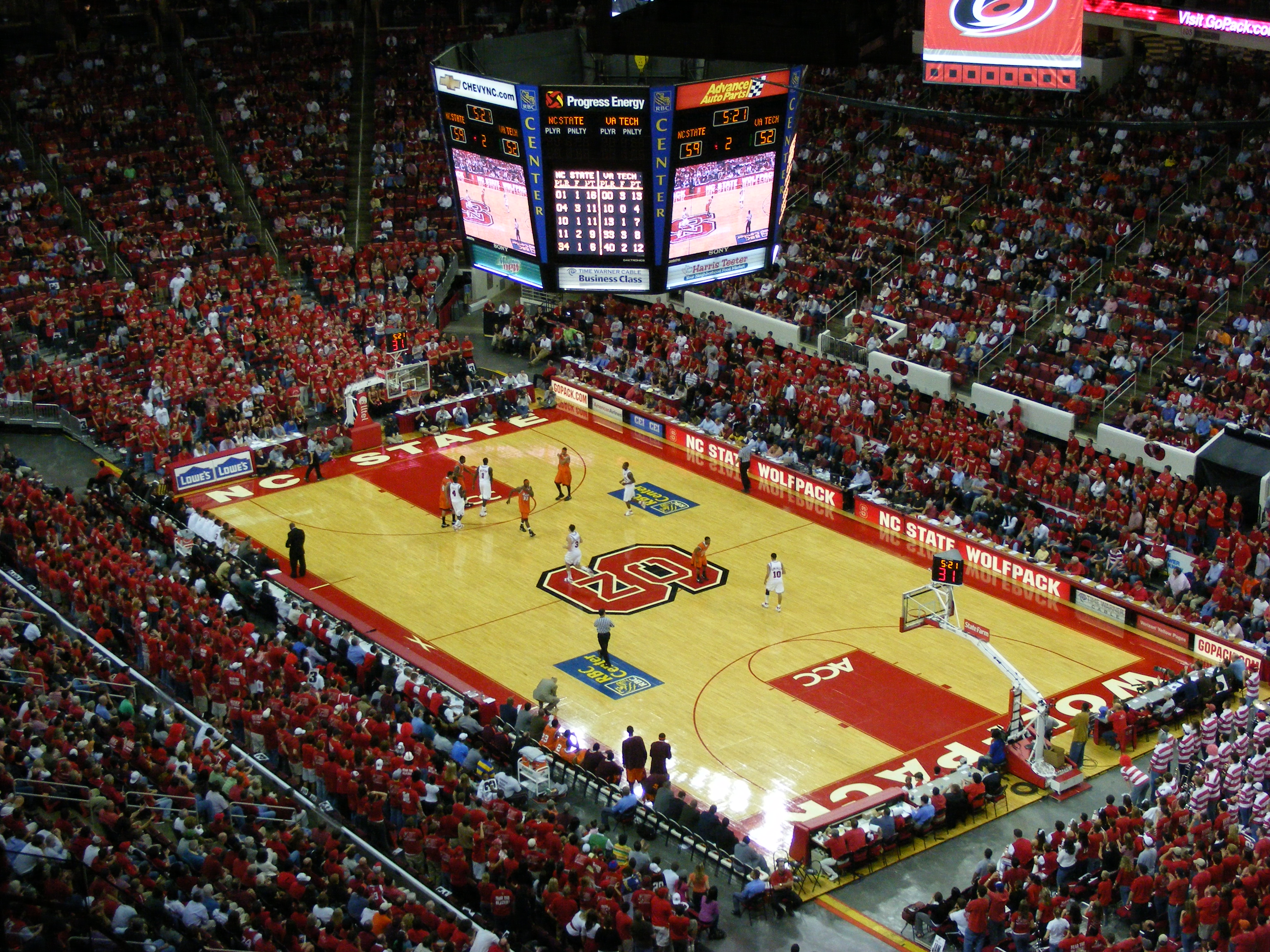
An NC State college basketball game at the arena, then known as the RBC Center, in 2008

In 2003, a ribbon board which encircles the arena bowl was installed. In 2008, the arena renovated its sound system. Clair Brothers Systems installed a combination of JBL line arrays to provide improved audio coverage for all events. In June 2009, video crews installed a new Daktronics HD scoreboard. It replaced the ten-year-old scoreboard that had been in the arena since its opening in 1999. The scoreboard was full LED and four-sided with full video displays, whereas the previous scoreboard was eight-sided; four of those sides featured alternating static dot-matrix displays (very much outdated for today's standards). In addition, the scoreboard featured an octagonal top section with full video capability, along with two rings above and below the main video screens; they were similar to the ribbon board encircling the arena.

In October 2015, architects met with the Centennial Authority to discuss a potential arena renovation. Their proposal includes all-new entrances, a new rooftop restaurant and bar, covered tailgating sections, and moving the administrative offices elsewhere in the arena as a result. The plans also call for new office spaces, additional meeting spaces, removing stairwells and aisles, adding wider seats, and perhaps building lounges on the mezzanine levels below the main concourse level. Project costs were not decided, as the architects were given until May/June 2016 to come up with estimates. The cost was estimated to be almost $200 million. The Centennial Authority would have to approve the estimates before official voting. If the funds had been approved the renovation would've started in 2020 and been completed by 2022 at the earliest. However, this would not come to pass.

During mid-2016, the ribbon boards were upgraded and a second ribbon board was added to the upper level fascia. Static advertising signs inside the lower bowl of the arena were replaced with LED video boards. In 2018, they renovated the NHL home locker rooms and replaced the seating in the upper bowl as well as an ice/court projection system that was first used December 23 at a Hurricanes game against the Boston Bruins.

In April 2019, it was announced that the arena would receive a new Daktronics video board later that year. The board would be nearly three times as large as the then-current board. The new video board would feature a full 360 degree display, two underbelly screens and two underbelly static advertising signs. It will also be the first of its kind and one of only a few 360 degree video boards in the NHL. The board would cost $4.7 million, would stretch blue line to blue line, and would be 4,000 square feet (370 m^{2}). Original plans called for a 2018 installation, but the project was postponed due to structural/roof issues. The old video board was taken down on June 1, 2019. The new board debuted on September 18, 2019.

In November 2019, Raleigh approved funding for the arena at $9 million a year for 25 years for arena enhancements, putting the grand total to $200 million. Some concessions in the arena were updated in 2019 in addition to the LED upgrade. These included a new marketplace in the upper concourse as well as other concessions renovated and a new color changing lighting system on the exterior of the South End. The Centennial Authority (operating group) and the Hurricanes are also meeting to further discuss the future renovations and the future of the Hurricanes at Lenovo Center. Most offices were expected to move out before the 2020–21 NHL season and renovations were to start. Plans for renovations are currently on hold.

In April 2022, it was announced that Invisalign would become an official arena partner, extending their partnership with the Carolina Hurricanes. Following this announcement, the East and West arena entrances were respectively renamed to become the "Invisalign East Entrance" and "Invisalign West Entrance."

After being put on hold during the COVID-19 pandemic, the renovation project was reconsidered. The Centennial Authority met with local officials, the Carolina Hurricanes, and National Hockey League Commissioner Gary Bettman in May 2022. After discussion, the Centennial Authority approved the continuation of the project, while also inviting CAA ICON to design the project. Plans call for renovations inside the arena, as well as on surrounding land to become "one of the top entertainment venues in the Southeast." Additionally, there are plans for a new outdoor concert venue on site.

In June 2022, the arena board approved a $25.8 million budget for the fiscal year (begins July 2022), that would be utilized on 17 different enhancement projects, including a $7.8 million replacement of the arena roof.

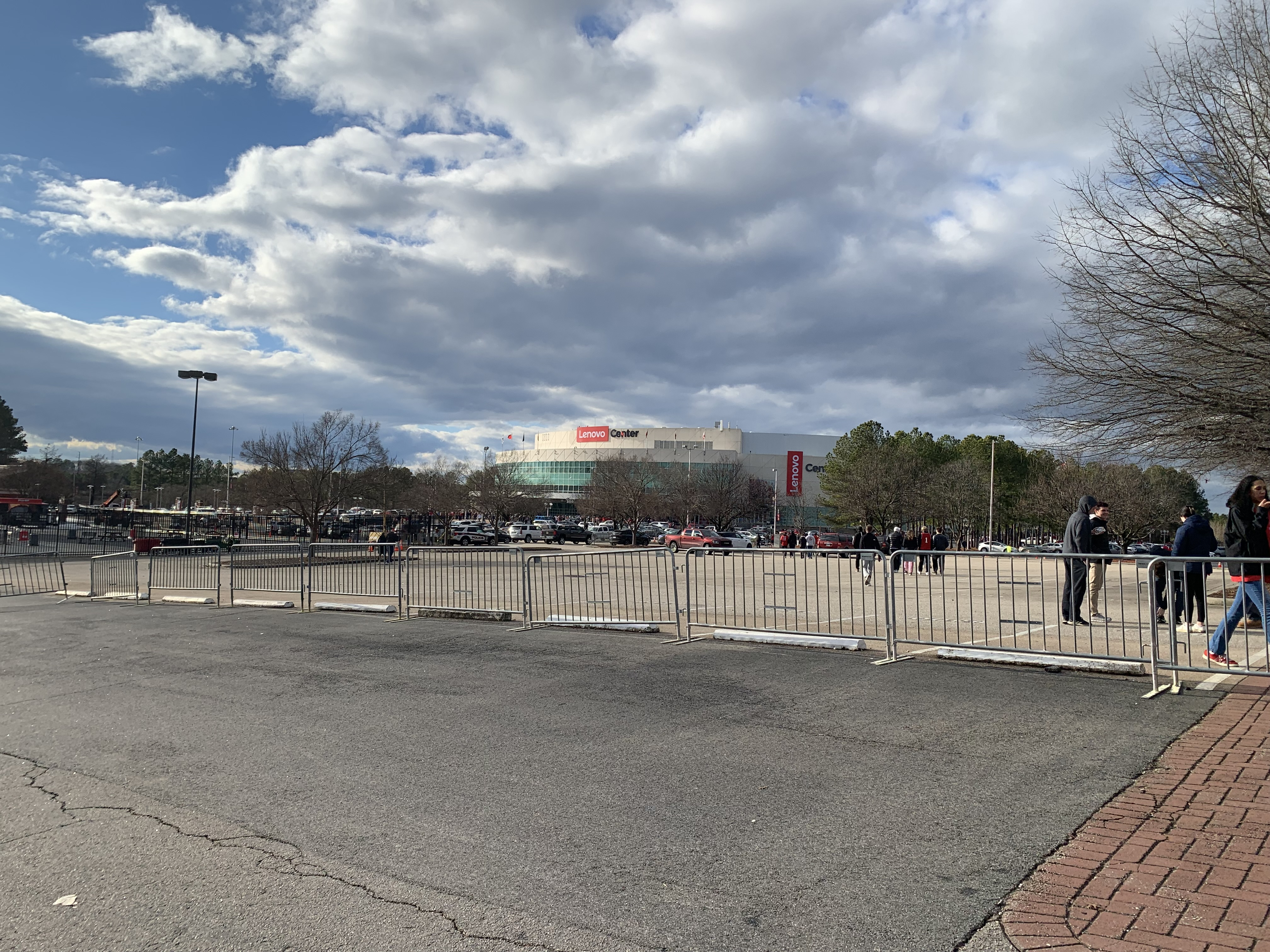
Lenovo Center Parking

On August 15, 2023, the Centennial Authority, Carolina Hurricanes, and NC State University announced intentions to move forward with renovation and redevelopment plans. Expected to begin in 2024, the arena will see $300M in renovations from public funding. In addition, the Hurricanes promised to privately fund and develop the 80 acres of land at a cost of $200M within 5 years, $400M within 10 years, and $800M within 20 years. Phase one will include at least 100,000 sq ft of retail/dining, 150,000 sq ft of office space, 200 multi-family residential units, a 150-room hotel, and a 3,000-5,000 capacity indoor music venue. 10% of residential units throughout all phases will not exceed 80% of the area's median income levels. In addition, 95% of the 4,000 surface parking spaces lost will be replaced with parking decks.

Renovations, which will take place over multiple summers, officially began in March 2025 featuring new bunker suites, luxury spaces, and a view bar.

== List of concerts and notable events ==
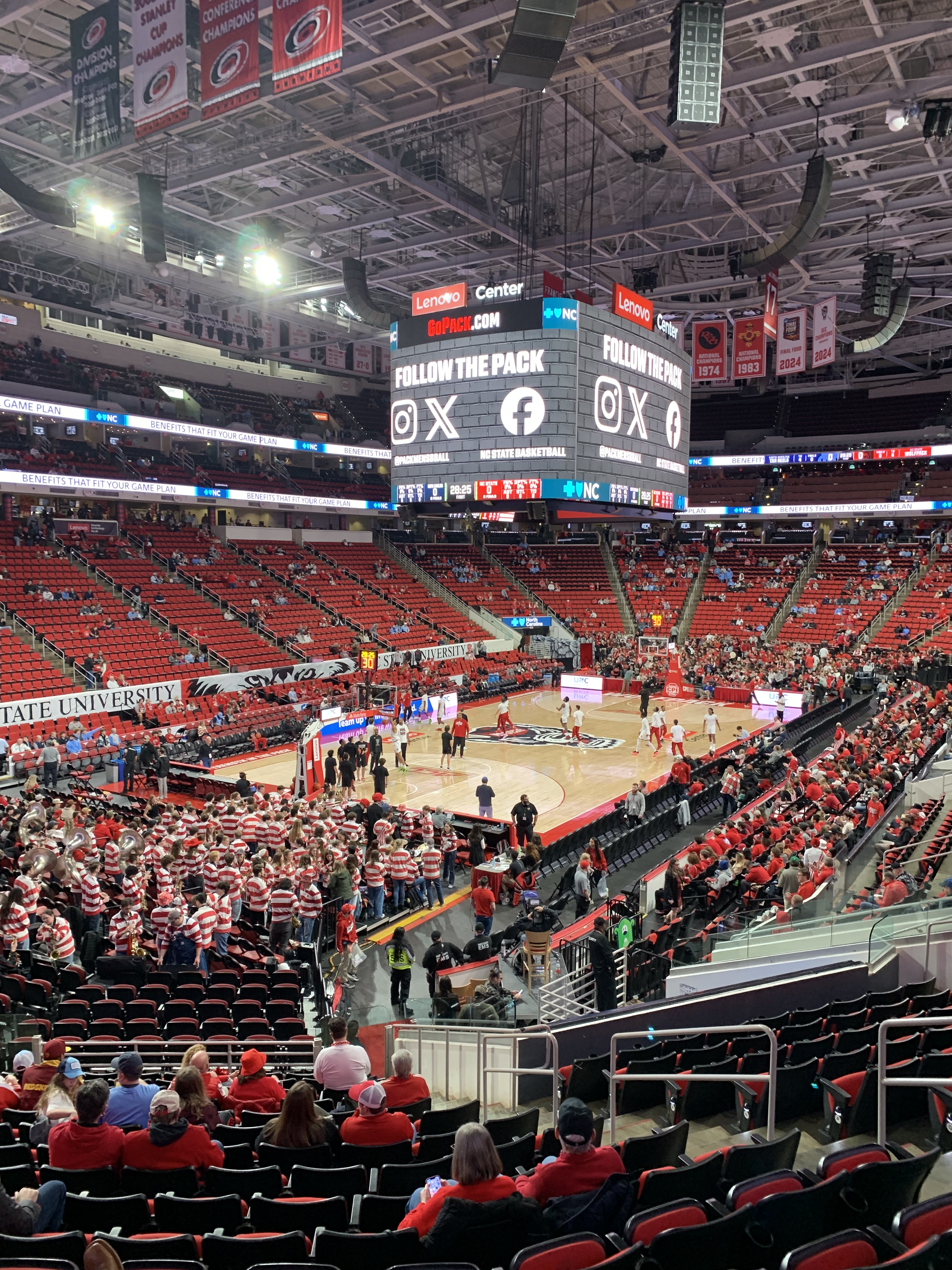
Lenovo Center setup for NC State Basketball, 2025

In addition to hockey and college basketball, the Lenovo Center hosts a wide array of concerts, family shows, and other events each year. Past concerts include Beyoncé, Paul McCartney, Ed Sheeran, Taylor Swift, Justin Timberlake, Bruno Mars, Elton John, Mariah Carey, Guns N' Roses, Post Malone, Blink-182, Lil Wayne, Celine Dion, Jelly Roll, Twenty One Pilots, Nicki Minaj, Linkin Park, Reba McEntire, One Direction, Sam Smith, Jonas Brothers, Alan Jackson, Fall Out Boy, KISS, Def Leppard, and many other artists. Family shows have included Disney on Ice, Ringling Bros. and Barnum & Bailey Circus, Sesame Street Live, Cirque du Soleil, Rodeo, Stand-up comedy, Monster Jam, WWE, and Harlem Globetrotters. The arena has also hosted several college hockey games between NC State and North Carolina.

- The arena hosted the Central Intercollegiate Athletic Association (CIAA) men's basketball tournament from 1999 to 2008.
- As the RBC Center, the arena hosted the 2005 Jeopardy College Championship November 7 through November 18 with Peter Ellis representing North Carolina State University.
- The arena was a site for Rounds 1 and 2 of the 2004, 2008, 2014, 2016, and 2025 NCAA Division I men's basketball tournament, respectively.
- The arena set a single-event attendance record of 20,052 fans on January 28, 2019, for Metallica's WorldWired Tour.
- The arena hosted Apex Legends Global Series Championship on July 7–10. June 6, 2022.

List of concerts at the arena
Artist	Event	Date	Opening act(s)
The 1975	North American Tour 2019	November 19, 2019	Laundry Day
AC/DC	Stiff Upper Lip World Tour	April 1, 2001	Wide Mouth Mason
Adam Sandler	You're My Best Friend Tour	September 11, 2025	Rob Schneider
AJR	The Maybe Man Tour	April 9, 2024	Dean Lewis
A Perfect Circle	Spring US Tour 2004	May 13, 2004	Burning Brides
Alabama	50th Anniversary Tour	October 7, 2021	Tracy Lawrence
Alan Jackson	Keepin' It Country Tour	October 27, 2017	Lauren Alaina
Andrea Bocelli	Live in Concert	February 14, 2024	—N/a
Andrea Bocelli	Romanza: 30th Anniversary World Tour	February 20, 2026	—N/a
Ariana Grande	The Honeymoon Tour	September 24, 2015	Prince Royce & Who Is Fancy
Ariana Grande	Sweetener World Tour	November 22, 2019	Social House
Avenged Sevenfold	Life Is But A Dream Tour	March 29, 2024	Sullivan King & Poppy (singer)
The Avett Brothers	True Sadness Tour	December 31, 2017	The Felice Brothers & Mandolin Orange
The Avett Brothers	New Year's Eve Concert	December 31, 2023	Marcus King
Backstreet Boys	Into the Millennium Tour	February 18, 2000	—N/a
Backstreet Boys	Black & Blue Tour	June 13, 2001	Krystal Harris & Shaggy
Backstreet Boys	DNA World Tour	August 20, 2019	—N/a
Barry Manilow	US Tour	April 26, 2013	—N/a
beabadoobee	The Powerlines Tour	October 11, 2026	wisp
Benson Boone	American Heart World Tour	September 7, 2025	Elliot James Reay
Beyoncé	The Beyoncé Experience	July 28, 2007	Robin Thicke
Billie Eilish	Where Do We Go? World Tour	March 12, 2020	—N/a
Billie Eilish	Hit Me Hard and Soft: The Tour	October 16, 2025	Young Miko
Billie Eilish	Hit Me Hard and Soft: The Tour	October 17, 2025	Young Miko
Billy Joel	Billy Joel in Concert	February 9, 2014	—N/a
The Black Eyed Peas	The E.N.D. World Tour	February 19, 2009	Ludacris & LMFAO
The Black Keys	Turn Blue Tour	December 5, 2014	St. Vincent
The Black Keys	Let's Rock	November 8, 2019	Modest Mouse
Blink-182	One More Time Tour	July 30, 2024	Pierce the Veil & Astronoid
Bob Segar & the Silver Bullet Band	Rock and Roll Never Forgets Tour	April 27, 2013	Big Daddy Love
Bon Iver	I, I Tour	October 19, 2019	Feist
Bon Jovi	Bounce Tour	March 21, 2003	—N/a
Bon Jovi	Because We Can Tour	November 6, 2013	—N/a
Bon Jovi	This House Is Not for Sale Tour	April 24, 2018	Iron Dynamite
Bon Jovi	Bon Jovi 2022 Tour	April 9, 2022	—N/a
Brandon Lake	King of Hearts Tour	March 22, 2026	Franni Cash
Brantley Gilbert	Let it Ride Tour	October 30, 2014	—N/a
Britney Spears	Dream Within a Dream Tour	December 14, 2001	LFO
Britney Spears	Femme Fatale Tour	August 21, 2011	Destinee & Paris & DJ Pauly D
Brooks & Dunn	Neon Moon Tour	March 27, 2025	David Lee Murphy & Molly Tuttle
Bruce Springsteen and the E Street Band	Bruce Springsteen and the E Street Band Reunion Tour	April 22, 2000	—N/a
Bruce Springsteen and the E Street Band	High Hopes Tour	April 24, 2014	—N/a
Bruno Mars	The Moonshine Jungle Tour	June 14, 2014	Aloe Blacc & Pharrell Williams
Bruno Mars	24K Magic World Tour	October 12, 2017	Jorja Smith
Bryan Adams	Roll with the Punches Tour	November 5, 2025	Pat Benatar & Neil Giraldo
Cardi B	Little Miss Drama Tour	April 11, 2026	—N/a
Carrie Underwood	Cry Pretty Tour 360	September 30, 2019	Maddie & Tae, Runaway June
Casting Crowns	The Very Next Thing Tour	March 10, 2017	Danny Gokey & Unspoken
Casting Crowns	Only Jesus Tour	April 19, 2019	Zach Williams & Austin French
Casting Crowns	Healer Tour	May 16, 2022	We the Kingdom
Celine Dion	Taking Chances World Tour	January 21, 2009	—N/a
Celine Dion	Courage World Tour	February 11, 2020	—N/a
The Chainsmokers	Memories Do Not Open Tour	May 24, 2017	Kiiara & Emily Warren
Charlie Wilson	Forever Charlie Tour	February 18, 2015	Kem Joe
Charlie Wilson	In It To Win It Tour	October 28, 2017	—N/a
The Chicks	Fly Tour	September 15, 2000	Ricky Skaggs
Childish Gambino	New World Tour	August 30, 2024	Willow
Cher	Dressed to Kill Tour	May 7, 2014	Cyndi Lauper
Cher	Here We Go Again Tour	January 27, 2019	Nile Rodgers & Chic
Chris Brown	Indigoat Tour	September 6, 2019	Tory Lanez, Ty Dolla Sign, Joyner Lucas, Yella Beezy
Chris Young	Losing Sleep World Tour	December 1, 2018	Dan + Shay & Morgan Evans
Chris Tomlin & MercyMe	Winter Tour 2022	December 1, 2022	—N/a
Christina Aguilera	Back to Basics Tour	May 1, 2007	Pussycat Dolls & Danity Kane
Cigarettes After Sex	X's World Tour	September 11, 2024	—N/a
Cody Johnson	2023 Concert Tour	January 28, 2023	Randy Houser & Jesse Raub Jr.
Conan Gray	Wishbone World Tour	March 4, 2026	Esha Tewari
Dave Matthews Band	Winter 2012 Tour	December 12, 2012	The Lumineers
D'Angelo & Mary J. Blige	The Liberation Tour	June 7, 2013	Bridget Kelly
Def Leppard & Journey	Def Leppard & Journey 2018 Tour	June 5, 2018	—N/a
Demi Lovato	Demi World Tour	September 12, 2014	MKTO
Disturbed	The Sickness 25th Anniversary Tour	April 14, 2025	Daughtry & Nothing More
Dolly Parton	Dolly Parton Live!	November 5, 2008	—N/a
Eagles	Long Road Out of Eden Tour	June 17, 2010	Dixie Chicks
Eagles	History of the Eagles – Live in Concert	February 28, 2014	JD & the Straight Shot
Eagles	An Evening with the Eagles	April 17, 2018	JD & the Straight Shot
Eagles	Eagles 50 Years	March 2, 2022	—N/a
Eagles	The Long Goodbye Final Tour	November 9, 2023	The Doobie Brothers
Ed Sheeran	÷ Tour	September 2, 2017	James Blunt
Elevation Worship	Outcry Tour	April 29, 2017	—N/a
Elton John	Greatest Hits Tour	March 16, 2012	—N/a
Elton John	Farewell Yellow Brick Road Tour	March 12, 2019	—N/a
Enrique Iglesias & Pitbull & Ricky Martin	The Trilogy Tour 2024	February 29, 2024	—N/a
Eric Church	The Outsiders World Tour	April 23, 2015	Dwight Yoakam, Brothers Osborne; Halestorm & Drive By Truckers
Eric Clapton	50th Anniversary Tour	April 3, 2013	The Wallflowers
Fantasia	The Sketchbook Tour	December 1, 2019	Robin Thicke, Tank, & The Bonfyre
Fantasia & Anthony Hamilton	Live In Concert	April 5, 2025	—
Fall Out Boy	So Much For (Tour) Dust	March 19, 2024	Jimmy Eat World, Hot Mulligan, Games We Play
Forrest Frank	The Jesus Generation Tour	June 16, 2026	Tori Kelly
Garth Brooks	The Garth Brooks World Tour with Trisha Yearwood	March 11, 2016	Trisha Yearwood
Garth Brooks	The Garth Brooks World Tour with Trisha Yearwood	March 12, 2016	Trisha Yearwood
Garth Brooks	The Garth Brooks World Tour with Trisha Yearwood	March 13, 2016	Trisha Yearwood
Genesis	The Last Domino? Tour	November 19, 2021	—N/a
George Strait	Road Less Traveled Tour	February 22, 2003	—N/a
Ghost	Skeletour World Tour 2025	July 15, 2025	—
Green Day	American Idiot World Tour	August 24, 2005	Jimmy Eat World
Greta Van Fleet	Dreams in Gold Tour	March 13, 2023	Robert Finley & Houndmouth
Guns N' Roses	Guns N' Roses 2020 Tour	September 29, 2021	Mammoth WVH
Harry Styles	Love On Tour	October 12, 2021	Jenny Lewis
Hank Williams Jr. & Lynyrd Skynyrd	The Rowdy Frynds Tour	April 28, 2007	38 Special
Hans Zimmer	Hans Zimmer Live	September 10, 2024	—N/a
Hilary Duff	The Lucky Me Tour	October 4, 2027	Dashboard Confessional
Hootie & the Blowfish	Tour 2023	February 17, 2023	Susto
Imagine Dragons	Mercury Tour	February 10, 2022	Grandson
Janet Jackson	All for You Tour	September 5, 2001	112
Jay-Z & R. Kelly	Best of Both Worlds Tour	November 12, 2004	—N/a
James Taylor	2022 Tour	June 25, 2022	Jackson Browne
Jimmy Buffett	Far Side of the World Tour	February 3, 2003	—N/a
Jelly Roll	Beautifully Broken Tour	September 20, 2024	Warren Zeiders & Alexandra Kay
Jonas Brothers	Happiness Begins Tour	August 14, 2019	Bebe Rexha & Jordan McGraw
Jonas Brothers	Five Albums. One Night. The World Tour	September 28, 2023	Lawrence
Jonas Brothers	Jonas20: Greetings from Your Hometown Tour	October 29, 2025	The All-American Rejects
Jonas Brothers	The Burning Up Tour All Over Again	October 1, 2026	Jamie Miller & Deleasa
JoJo Siwa	D.R.E.A.M. The Tour	March 1, 2022	The Belles
Josh Groban	Straight to You Tour	June 11, 2011	ELEW
Journey	Freedom Tour 2024	February 17, 2024	Toto
Justin Timberlake	The 20/20 Experience World Tour	November 13, 2013	The Weeknd
Justin Timberlake	The Man of the Woods Tour	January 6, 2019	Francesco Yates
Justin Timberlake	The Forget Tomorrow World Tour	June 12, 2024	—N/a
Kane Brown	In The Air Tour	June 7, 2024	Tyler Hubbard & Parmalee
Katy Perry	California Dreams Tour	June 14, 2011	Robyn & DJ Skeet Skeet
Katy Perry	The Prismatic World Tour	June 22, 2014	Capital Cities & Ferras
Katy Perry	The Lifetimes Tour	August 17, 2025	Rebecca Black
Keith Urban	Escape Together World Tour	June 19, 2009	Sugarland
Keith Urban	Get Closer 2011 World Tour	June 25, 2011	Jake Owen
Kelly Clarkson & Clay Aiken	Independent Tour	March 1, 2004	The Beu Sisters
Kem & Ledisi	Soul II Soul Tour	March 10, 2023	Musiq Soulchild & Erica Campbell
Kenny Chesney	The Big Revival Tour	May 28, 2015	Jake Owen & Cole Swindell
Kid Rock	Rock n Roll Pain Train Tour	February 14, 2004	Gov't Mule
Kid Rock	Live Trucker Tour	April 7, 2006	—N/a
Kid Rock	Rock N' Roll Revival Tour	February 22, 2008	Rev Run
Kirk Franklin	Reunion Tour	September 26, 2024	Yolanda Adams, Fred Hammond, Marvin Sapp, & The Clark Sisters
KISS	End of the Road World Tour	April 6, 2019	David Garibaldi
Lady Gaga	The Monster Ball Tour	September 19, 2010	Semi Precious Weapons
Lauren Daigle	Kaleidoscope Tour	February 23, 2024	Blessing Offor
Lil Baby	It's Only Us Tour	September 11, 2023	GloRilla, Gloss Up, Rylo Rodriguez & Hunxho
Lil Uzi Vert	Pink Tape Tour	November 3, 2023	—N/a
Lil Wayne	Live In Concert Tour	March 15, 2025	Quavo & Anella
Limp Bizkit	Billionaire Pirates Tour	November 14, 1999	Method Man & Redman; System of a Down
Linkin Park	From Zero World Tour	May 6, 2025	grandson
Little Big Town & Sugarland	Take Me Home Tour	October 25, 2024	The Castellows
Lizzo	The Special Tour	May 10, 2023	Latto
LL Cool J	The F.O.R.C.E. Tour	September 10, 2023	DJ Jazzy Jeff, Juvenile, & De La Soul
Luis Miguel	México En La Piel Tour	October 26, 2005	—N/a
Luis Miguel	México Por Siempre Tour	June 18, 2019	—N/a
Luke Combs	What You See Is What You Get 2021 Tour	September 10, 2021	Ashley McBryde & Drew Parker
Luke Combs	What You See Is What You Get 2021 Tour	September 11, 2021	Ashley McBryde & Drew Parker
Machine Gun Kelly	Mainstream Sellout Tour	June 22, 2022	Avril Lavigne & Iann Dior
Macklemore & Ryan Lewis	The Heist Tour	November 19, 2013	Talib Kweli & Big K.R.I.T.
Mariah Carey	Mariah Carey's Christmas Time	December 9, 2024	DJ Suss One
Martina McBride	Timeless Tour	April 2, 2006	The Warren Brothers
Mary J. Blige	For My Fans Tour	January 31, 2025	Ne-Yo
Matchbox Twenty	Mad Season Tour	April 16, 2001	Everclear & Lifehouse
Maverick City Music	Good News Tour	November 19, 2024	Stephen McWhirter
Megan Thee Stallion	Hot Girl Summer Tour	June 4, 2024	GloRilla
Melanie Martinez	The Trilogy Tour	May 31, 2024	Beach Bunny & Sofia Isella
MercyMe	Imagine Nation Tour	October 20, 2019	Crowder & Micah Tyler
Metallica	WorldWired Tour	January 28, 2019	Jim Breuer
Michael Bublé	Crazy Love Tour	July 9, 2010	Naturally 7
Michael Bublé	To Be Loved Tour	October 25, 2013	Naturally 7
Michael Bublé	An Evening with Michael Bublé	October 26, 2021	Naturally 7
Miley Cyrus	Bangerz Tour	April 8, 2014	Icona Pop
Motionless in White	The Sweat and Blood Tour	November 3, 2026	Dayseeker, The Devil Wears Prada, Dark Divine
Mötley Crüe	Mötley Crüe Final Tour	August 28, 2015	Alice Cooper
Mumford & Sons	Delta Tour	March 17, 2019	Cat Power
Muse	The Resistance Tour	October 26, 2010	Metric
My Chemical Romance	Reunion Tour	August 26, 2022	Soul Glo & Turnstile
NBA YoungBoy	Make America Slime Again Tour	October 24, 2025	K3, Lil Dump, Dee Baby, NoCap, Offset
Neil Diamond	World Tour 2001–2002	March 12, 2002	—
New Kids on the Block	Mixtape Tour 2019	July 7, 2019	Salt-N-Pepa, Tiffany, Debbie Gibson, & Naughty By Nature
NF	Hope Tour	May 22, 2024	—N/a
Nicki Minaj	Pink Friday 2 World Tour	October 8, 2024	Tyga, Bia & Skillibeng
Nickelback	All the Right Reasons Tour	September 3, 2006	Hoobastank & Chevelle
Nine Inch Nails	Twenty Thirteen Tour	October 21, 2013	Godspeed You! Black Emperor & Explosions in the Sky
NSYNC	No Strings Attached Tour	July 5, 2000	P!nk & Sisqó
Old Dominion	No Bad Vibes Tour	September 30, 2023	Tyler Hubbard & Kylie Morgan
One Direction	Take Me Home Tour	June 22, 2013	5 Seconds of Summer
Panic! at the Disco	Pray for the Wicked Tour	July 28, 2018	A R I Z O N A & Hayley Kiyoko
Panic! at the Disco	Viva Las Vengeance Tour	October 2, 2022	Marina & Jake Wesley Rogers
Paul McCartney	Driving World Tour	October 7, 2002	—N/a
Paul McCartney	Freshen Up	May 27, 2019	—N/a
Pearl Jam	Dark Matter World Tour	May 11-13, 2025	—
Pentatonix	Hallelujah! It's A Christmas Tour	November 30, 2024	—
Phoebe Bridgers	The Lost Tour	March 9, 2027	Paper Wings
P!nk	Trustfall Tour	November 11, 2024	Maren Morris & KidCutUp
P!nk	Trustfall Tour	November 12, 2024	Maren Morris & KidCutUp
Playboi Carti	Antagonist Tour	November 13, 2025	Ken Carson & Destroy Lonely
Post Malone	Runaway Tour	October 17, 2019	Swae Lee, Tyla Yaweh
Prince	Welcome 2	March 23, 2011	Anthony Hamilton
Rage Against the Machine	Public Service Announcement Tour	July 31, 2022	Run the Jewels
Rainbow Kitten Surprise	Love Hate Music Box Tour	October 26, 2024	—N/a
Rascal Flatts	Life Is a Highway Tour	January 15, 2026	Lauren Alaina & Chris Lane
Reba McEntire	Live in Concert	December 3, 2022	Jo Dee Messina
Red Hot Chili Peppers	Stadium Arcadium World Tour	January 22, 2007	Gnarls Barkley
Red Hot Chili Peppers	I'm With You World Tour	April 4, 2012	Santigold
Red Hot Chili Peppers	The Getaway World Tour	April 15, 2017	Babymetal & Jack Irons
R. Kelly	The After Party Tour	March 17, 2017	Monica (singer)
Robert Plant & Alison Krauss	Raising Sand Tour	July 11, 2008	Sharon Little
Rod Stewart	Rockin' in the Round Tour	May 4, 2007	—N/a
Rod Wave	Nostalgia Tour	November 14, 2023	Ari Lennox & Toosii
Rod Wave	Don't Look Down Tour	September 15, 2026	—N/a
Roger Waters	The Wall Live	July 9, 2012	—N/a
Roger Waters	This Is Not a Drill	August 18, 2022	—N/a
Rush	Clockwork Angels Tour	May 3, 2013	—N/a
Sabrina Carpenter	Short n' Sweet Tour	October 19, 2024	Griff
Sam Smith	In the Lonely Hour Tour	October 6, 2015	Gavin James
Sam Smith	Gloria the Tour	August 1, 2023	Jessie Reyez
Sarah McLachlan	Afterglow Tour	July 30, 2004	Butterfly Boucher
Shania Twain	Queen of Me Tour	October 18, 2023	Lily Rose
Shinedown	Dance, Kid, Dance Tour	August 21, 2025	Bush band
Slayer	Slayer Farewell Tour	November 3, 2019	Primus, Ministry, Philip H. Anselmo & The Illegals
Stevie Nicks	24 Karat Gold Tour	March 19, 2017	The Pretenders
Stevie Nicks	Stevie Nicks Live in Concert	May 12, 2023	Nicole Atkins
Stevie Wonder	Live in Concert	November 29, 2007	—N/a
Sugarland	Still the Same Tour	May 26, 2018	Brandy Clark & Clare Bowen
Suicideboys	Grey Day Tour	September 15, 2024	Denzel Curry, Pouya, Ekkstacy, & Shakewell
Tate McRae	Miss Possessive Tour	October 25, 2025	Alessi Rose
Taylor Swift	Fearless Tour	May 1, 2010	Kellie Pickler & Gloriana
Taylor Swift	Speak Now World Tour	November 17, 2011	NEEDTOBREATHE & Danny Gokey
Taylor Swift	The Red Tour	September 13, 2013	Ed Sheeran & Casey James
Taylor Swift	The 1989 World Tour	June 9, 2015	Vance Joy
Three Days Grace	Life Starts Now Tour	April 10, 2010	Chevelle & Adelitas Way
Three Days Grace	Alienation Tour	March 17, 2026	I Prevail & The Funeral Portrait
TLC	FanMail Tour	November 5, 1999	Ideal
Tim McGraw & Faith Hill	Soul2Soul Tour	July 15, 2000	Keith Urban
Tim McGraw & Faith Hill	Soul2Soul II Tour	June 9, 2006	—N/a
Tim McGraw & Faith Hill	Soul2Soul: The World Tour	June 22, 2018	Caitlyn Smith
Tim McGraw	Standing Room Only Tour	June 22, 2024	Carly Pearce & Timothy Wayne
Tina Turner	Twenty Four Seven Tour	October 8, 2000	Joe Cocker
Trans-Siberian Orchestra	TSO East 2016	December 14, 2016	—N/a
Trans-Siberian Orchestra	TSO East 2021	December 15, 2021	—N/a
Trans-Siberian Orchestra	TSO East 2022	December 14, 2022	—N/a
Trans-Siberian Orchestra	Naujour Tour	November 14, 2023	—N/a
Trans-Siberian Orchestra	TSO East 2023	December 13, 2023	—N/a
Trisha Paytas	The Heartbreak Tour	July 1, 2023	—N/a
Travis Scott	Astroworld – Wish You Were Here Tour	November 9, 2018	—N/a
Tom Petty and the Heartbreakers	Hypnotic Eye Tour	September 18, 2014	Steve Winwood
Tool	Fear Inoculum Tour	November 24, 2019	Killing Joke
Twenty One Pilots	The Bandito Tour	June 11, 2019	Bear Hands
Twenty One Pilots	The Clancy World Tour	September 13, 2024	Balu Brigada
Tyler, the Creator	Chromakopia: The World Tour	July 12, 2025	Lil Yachty
Usher	Truth Tour	August 7, 2004	John Legend & Ye
Van Halen	2008 North American Tour	May 5, 2008	Ryan Shaw
Weezer	Hyper-Extended Midget Tour	February 22, 2002	Saves the Day & Ozma
The Who	The Who Hits 50!	April 21, 2015	Joan Jett and the Blackhearts
The Wiggles	Pop Go the Wiggles Live!	August 22, 2008	—N/a
Winter Jam Tour Spectacular	Winter Jam 2012	January 7, 2012	—N/a
Winter Jam Tour Spectacular	Winter Jam 2014	January 3, 2014	—N/a
Winter Jam Tour Spectacular	Winter Jam 2015	March 13, 2015	—N/a
Winter Jam Tour Spectacular	Winter Jam 2016	March 25, 2016	—N/a
Winter Jam Tour Spectacular	Winter Jam 2017	January 22, 2017	—N/a
Winter Jam Tour Spectacular	Winter Jam 2018	March 24, 2018	—N/a
Winter Jam Tour Spectacular	Winter Jam 2019	March 22, 2019	—N/a
Winter Jam Tour Spectacular	Winter Jam 2022	March 19, 2022	—N/a
Winter Jam Tour Spectacular	Winter Jam 2023	March 17, 2023	—N/a
Winter Jam Tour Spectacular	Winter Jam 2024	February 9, 2024	—N/a
Winter Jam Tour Spectacular	Winter Jam 2025	February 14, 2025	—N/a
Wu-Tang Clan	The Final Chamber	June 7, 2025	Run the Jewels
Xscape	The Great Xscape Tour	December 3, 2018	—N/a
Zac Brown Band	The Owl Tour	March 4, 2020	Amos Lee & Poo Bear
ZZ Top	XXX Tour	February 20, 2000	Lynyrd Skynyrd & Laidlaw

List of other events at the arena
Year	Event
2000	WWF Summerslam
2002	Stanley Cup Final
2004	NCAA Division I men's basketball tournament first and second round
2004	NHL Draft
2004	PBR Built Ford Tough Series Tour (formerly Bud Light Cup)
2005	Jeopardy! College Championship
2006	MEAC men's basketball tournament
2006	WWE No Mercy
2006	Stanley Cup Final
2007	MEAC men's basketball tournament
2007	NCAA Division I women's basketball tournament first and second round
2007	PBR Built Ford Tough Series Tour (formerly Bud Light Cup)
2008	MEAC men's basketball tournament
2008	NCAA Division I men's basketball tournament first and second round
2011	National Hockey League All-Star game
2011	2011 WWE Draft
2012	WWE Over the Limit
2014	NCAA Division I men's basketball tournament first and second round
2016	NCAA Division I men's basketball tournament first and second round
2020	UFC Fight Night: Blaydes vs. dos Santos
2022	Apex Legends Global Series Championship
2023	League of Legends Championship Series
2025	NCAA Division I men's basketball tournament first and second round
2025	PWHL Takeover Tour
2025	Rocket League Championship Series
2026	Stanley Cup Final

== See also ==
- List of NCAA Division I basketball arenas

== Notes ==
- NCSU Athletics. RBC Center Retrieved July 12, 2004 from .
- RBC Center: History. Retrieved July 12, 2004 from .
- The Hockey News. 59.37 (2006): 6.
- Live Sound: Clair Systems Revamps RBC Center Audio with JBL Loudspeakers. Retrieved May 15, 2009 from
- RBC Center Gets New Scoreboard. Retrieved June 7, 2009 from

Events and tenants
Preceded by Greensboro Coliseum	Home of the Carolina Hurricanes; 1999–present	Succeeded by current
Preceded by Reynolds Coliseum	Home of the NC State Wolfpack; 1999–present	Succeeded by current
Preceded by none	Home of the Carolina Cobras; 2000–2002	Succeeded by Charlotte Coliseum
Preceded by Petersen Events Center	Host of the Jeopardy! College Championship; 2005	Succeeded by Galen Center
Preceded by Bell Centre	Host of the NHL All-Star Game; 2011	Succeeded by Scotiabank Place
