= Smilo =

Smilo may refer to:

- Smilo Freiherr von Lüttwitz (1895–1975), German World War II general
- John Smilo (fl. 1386 or 1387), 29th bishop of Zagreb - see Paul Horvat, his predecessor
- Smilo (band), a Swedish electronic dance music trio
- Smilo-, a taxonomic affix

== See also ==
- Piptatherum miliaceum, a grass species commonly called smilograss
