= Overkill (EP) =

1984 extended play by Overkill

EP by Overkill
- Released: 1985
- Recorded: October–November 1984
- Studio: Venture Sound Studio, Somerville, New Jersey
- Genre: Thrash metal, speed metal
- Length: 24:04
- Label: Azra/Metal Storm
- Producer: Mike Siegel & Vadim Rubin

Overkill chronology
Power in Black (1983)	Overkill (1985)	Feel the Fire (1985)

Overkill is the first extended play (EP) recorded by thrash metal band Overkill released in 1985 on Azra/Metal Storm records. It is the band's first album, preceding their debut studio album Feel the Fire. Released only on vinyl, the EP has been seen as a rare collector's item amongst Overkill fans, and all tracks are included on the !!!Fuck You!!! And Then Some compilation.

All of the songs from this EP (except for "The Answer") would be re-recorded for the band's future albums; "Rotten to the Core" and "Overkill" were re-recorded for Feel the Fire, while "Fatal If Swallowed" was re-recorded for Taking Over.

== Track listing ==
No.	Title	Length
1.	"Rotten to the Core"	5:14
2.	"Fatal if Swallowed"	6:20
3.	"The Answer"	8:49
4.	"Overkill"	3:41
Total length:		24:04

== Personnel ==
- Bobby "Blitz" Ellsworth – vocals
- Bobby Gustafson – guitars
- D.D. Verni – bass
- Rat Skates – drums
