= Necroshine =

1999 studio album by Overkill

Studio album by Overkill
- Released: February 23, 1999
- Recorded: November–December 1998
- Studio: Carriage House Studios, Stamford, Connecticut
- Genre: Thrash metal; groove metal
- Length: 51:03
- Label: CMC
- Producer: Overkill, Andy Katz

Overkill chronology
From the Underground and Below (1997)	Necroshine (1999)	Coverkill (1999)

Professional ratings
Review scores
Source	Rating
AllMusic	3/5 stars

Necroshine is the tenth studio album by thrash metal band Overkill released on February 23, 1999, on CMC International records.

It is the first Overkill album to feature a guest vocalist, with singer Blitz's sister Mary Ellsworth performing background vocals on "Let Us Prey" and a duet with Blitz on "Revelation". The title track is an almost permanent addition to Overkill's live set, being played at almost every live performance since its release. Necroshine was reissued along with From the Underground and Below (1998) as part of a box set in 2003. As of November 1999, Necroshine sold over 20,500 copies in the United States.

Necroshine marked the first time in Overkill's career that they did not make any personnel changes after more than two studio albums, although guitarist Sebastian Marino left the band shortly before its release.

== Track listing ==
All tracks are written by Bobby "Blitz" Ellsworth and D.D. Verni except where noted.

No.	Title	Length
1.	"Necroshine"	6:03
2.	"My December"	5:01
3.	"Let Us Prey"	6:40
4.	"80 Cycles"	5:50
5.	"Revelation"	4:39
6.	"Stone Cold Jesus"	5:19
7.	"Forked Tongue Kiss"	4:02
8.	"I Am Fear"	4:30
9.	"Black Line"	4:43
10.	"Dead Man"	4:16
Total length:		51:03

Japanese bonus track
No.	Title	Writer(s)	Length
11.	"No Feelings (Sex Pistols cover)" (Japanese bonus track)	Glen Matlock, Johnny Rotten, Paul Thomas Cook, and Stephen Philip Jones	2:37
Total length:			53:40

== Personnel ==
- Bobby "Blitz" Ellsworth – lead vocals
- D.D. Verni – bass, backing vocals
- Sebastian Marino – guitar
- Joe Comeau – guitar, vocals
- Tim Mallare – drums

== Additional personnel ==
- Produced and mixed by Overkill and Andy Katz
- Additional vocals by Mary Ellsworth
- Engineered by Andy Katz
- Mastered by Roger Lian at Masterdisk
- Pre-production at Gear Rehearsal Studios, Shrewsbury, New Jersey, USA

== Charts ==
Chart (1999)	Peak position
US Top Heatseekers (Billboard)	37
