= W.F.O. (album) =

1994 studio album by Overkill

Studio album by Overkill
- Released: July 15, 1994
- Recorded: April–May 1994
- Studio: Ambient Recording Co., Stamford, Connecticut
- Genre: Thrash metal, groove metal
- Length: 57:38
- Label: Atlantic
- Producer: Overkill

Overkill chronology
I Hear Black (1993)	W.F.O. (1994)	Wrecking Your Neck (1995)

W.F.O. (Wide Fucking Open) is the seventh studio album by thrash metal band Overkill, released on July 15, 1994, on Atlantic Records.

The album contains "hidden songs" on track 98 the songs start at 10:00, featuring the band warming up in the studio, playing "Heaven and Hell" by Black Sabbath, "The Ripper" by Judas Priest and "Voodoo Child (Slight Return)" by Jimi Hendrix. The instrumental song "R.I.P. (Undone)" was written as a tribute to Criss Oliva, co-founder of the band Savatage, who died nine months before the release of the album.

W.F.O. is the last Overkill album released by Atlantic Records, who released their previous five albums, and their last album with guitarists Rob Cannavino and Merritt Gant. W.F.O. and I Hear Black were re-released on Wounded Bird Records in 2005.

== Production and musical style ==
W.F.O. was the first album Overkill produced themselves. On the making of the album, frontman Bobby "Blitz" Ellsworth explained to Gavin Report:

We did it ourselves. We used Terry Date back in 1991, but he's almost unreachable now. Between the success of the Horrorscope album and the Pantera and Soundgarden albums, he's really off the map. We know our area and we just try to expand on it. We've never been one for tasting the flavor of the day. I think our longevity is due to the fact that we're not really followers. We enjoy our area and explore within it. A lot of people might say that it's not really artistic to say that you can't expand, but we just know where we're most potent. We just turned up the intensity with each record, as compared to exploring what people are calling alternative, grunge or industrial. The songs are born in a rehearsal room where everyone says 'we're there.' We put on a few finishing touches and then record it. We did this whole thing from soup to nuts this time and it was important that we saw that vision all the way through to the end. We had an option to take a producer but I've co-produced seven records with D.D., Rob is fantastic behind the board and Merritt has great ears. We just decided to go in an do it and not let anyone fuck with our vision.

While W.F.O. was said to be a return to the band's "good ol' thrashin' ways", it also retained the groove metal elements previously used on I Hear Black, but eschewed most of that album's influences from stoner and doom metal.

== Reception ==
Professional ratings
Review scores
Source	Rating
AllMusic	4/5 stars
Rock Hard	9.0/10

AllMusic's Jason Anderson gave the album a positive review, awarding it four stars out of five and stating, "W.F.O. probably represents the formal beginnings of a '90s commercial swoon for the thrash metal band." Anderson then added, "By the time of this 1994 release, the group's popularity might have been waning a little due to rock fashion trends leaning heavily away from thrash or anything that reminded listeners of the '80s. That's not to say that W.F.O. isn't a fine recording. It is probably one of the band's best, and last, thrash juggernauts."

W.F.O. reached number nine on the Billboard Heatseekers chart in 1994, making it Overkill's third-highest chart position (after I Hear Black and Ironbound, which peaked at number three and number four respectively). Unlike many of their previous albums, it did not chart on the Billboard 200.

== Track listing ==
- All songs written by Bobby "Blitz" Ellsworth and D.D. Verni.

No.	Title	Length
1.	"Where It Hurts"	5:33
2.	"Fast Junkie"	4:21
3.	"The Wait/New High in Lows"	5:46
4.	"They Eat Their Young"	4:57
5.	"What's Your Problem"	5:10
6.	"Under One"	4:14
7.	"Supersonic Hate"	4:17
8.	"R.I.P. (Undone)"	1:43
9.	"Up to Zero"	4:07
10.	"Bastard Nation"	5:38
11.	"Gasoline Dream"	6:49
Total length:		57:38

=== Hidden tracks ===
- Tracks 12 – 95 are all silence for 0:03–0:04
- 96 (blank) – 2:56
- 97 (blank) – 9:00
- 98 "Heaven and Hell", "The Ripper" and "Voodoo Child (Slight Return)" in rehearsals – (Starts at 1:00) – 4:55
- 99 (blank) – 0:04

== Sampling ==
"The Wait/New High in Lows" samples a quote from the 1993 crime film Carlito's Way.

== Personnel ==
- Bobby "Blitz" Ellsworth – lead vocals
- D.D. Verni – bass, backing vocals
- Merritt Gant – guitars
- Rob Cannavino – rhythm guitars, backing vocals, acoustic guitar
- Tim Mallare – drums

=== Additional personnel ===
- Produced by Overkill
- Keyboards by Doug Cook
- Engineered by Tom Bender and Doug Cook
- Mastered by Howie Weinberg at Masterdisk, New York City

== Charts ==
Chart (1994)	Peak position
US Top Heatseekers (Billboard)	9
