= Killbox 13 =

2003 studio album by Overkill

Studio album by Overkill
- Released: March 25, 2003
- Recorded: September–October 2002
- Studios: Gear Recording Studio, Shrewsbury, New Jersey
- Genre: Thrash metal
- Length: 50:22
- Label: Spitfire
- Producers: Colin Richardson, Overkill

Overkill chronology
Wrecking Everything (2002)	Killbox 13 (2003)	ReliXIV (2005)

Professional ratings
Review scores
Source	Rating
AllMusic	4/5 stars

Killbox 13 is the twelfth studio album by thrash metal band Overkill, released in 2003. It is the first album with rhythm guitarist Derek Tailer. The name stems from the fact that the band considers this to be their thirteenth release because they include the Overkill EP as their first, or that they had released the covers album Coverkill, which would have been their eleventh studio album. "Well, it is the thirteenth, but it's only really the thirteenth for people who followed the band. There was an EP called Overkill back in '84...", said Bobby Ellsworth.

Killbox 13 received much critical acclaim because some of the songs marked a return to the raw unpolished thrash style exhibited on the first album Feel The Fire, which Overkill had gradually moved away from afterwards.

== Track listing ==
All music is composed by D.D. Verni and Bobby 'Blitz' Ellsworth.

No.	Title	Length
1.	"Devil by the Tail"	5:24
2.	"Damned"	4:13
3.	"No Lights"	5:52
4.	"The One"	4:58
5.	"Crystal Clear"	5:03
6.	"The Sound of Dying"	4:56
7.	"Until I Die"	5:20
8.	"Struck Down"	4:42
9.	"Unholy"	4:40
10.	"I Rise"	5:08
Total length:		50:22

== Credits ==
- Bobby "Blitz" Ellsworth – lead vocals
- D.D. Verni – bass, backing vocals
- Dave Linsk – lead guitar
- Derek Tailer – rhythm guitar
- Tim Mallare – drums

== Production ==
- Produced by Colin Richardson and Overkill

== Charts ==
Chart (2003)	Peak position
US Top Independent Albums	31
