= Taking Over (Overkill album) =

1987 studio album by Overkill

Studio album by Overkill
- Released: March 16, 1987
- Recorded: September–December 1986
- Studio: Pyramid Sound Studios (Ithaca, New York)
- Genre: Thrash metal
- Length: 45:37
- Labels: Atlantic, Megaforce
- Producers: Overkill, Alex Perialas

Overkill chronology
Feel the Fire (1985)	Taking Over (1987)	!!!Fuck You!!! (1987)

Taking Over is the second studio album by American thrash metal band Overkill, released on March 16, 1987 through Atlantic and Megaforce Records. The album is Overkill's last to feature drummer Rat Skates, who left the band later in 1987 and was replaced by Sid Falck. It was also the first to be released through Atlantic, who would release all of the band's albums up to W.F.O. (1994).

== Touring and promotion ==
Overkill toured for less than a year to promote Taking Over. In March–April 1987, they opened for Helloween on their Keeper of the Seven Keys: Part I tour in Europe, and supported Megadeth on their Wake Up Dead Tour in May–June. Overkill then headlined their own shows in July–August, with Testament opening.

"Wrecking Crew" and "In Union We Stand" have been played live at almost every Overkill show to date, with the former being considered one of the band's signature songs, as well as being the title of their official website (wreckingcrew.com).

== Reception ==
Professional ratings
Review scores
Source	Rating
AllMusic	4/5 stars
Rock Hard	10/10

John Book at AllMusic gave Taking Over four stars out of five, saying "This New York band got a lot of attention with this album, although looking back at it, the vocals of Bobby 'Blitz' Ellsworth are somewhat dreadful compared to how they sound now." The album was Overkill's first to chart on the U.S. Billboard 200, reaching No. 191 and remaining on that chart for a week; it remains the band's second lowest chart position to date. In 2005, Taking Over was ranked No. 450 in Rock Hard magazine's book The 500 Greatest Rock & Metal Albums of All Time.

== Track listing ==
All tracks are written by Overkill.

No.	Title	Length
1.	"Deny the Cross"	4:43
2.	"Wrecking Crew"	4:32
3.	"Fear His Name"	5:24
4.	"Use Your Head"	4:19
5.	"Fatal If Swallowed"	6:45
6.	"Powersurge"	4:36
7.	"In Union We Stand"	4:26
8.	"Electro-Violence"	3:45
9.	"Overkill II (The Nightmare Continues)"	7:07
Total length:		45:37

== Personnel ==
- Bobby "Blitz" Ellsworth – vocals
- D. D. Verni – bass
- Bobby Gustafson – guitars
- Rat Skates – drums

Additional personnel

- Overkill – production
- Alex Perialas – engineering, mixing, production
- Tom Coyne – mastering
- Stephen Innocenzi – mastering (CD edition)
- Jon Zazula – executive production
- Bill Benson – cover painting

== Charts ==
Chart (1987)	Peak position
US Billboard 200	191
