= From the Underground and Below =

1997 studio album by Overkill

Studio album by Overkill
- Released: September 30, 1997
- Recorded: June–July, 1997
- Studio: Carriage House Studios, Stamford, Connecticut
- Genre: Groove metal; thrash metal
- Length: 47:07
- Label: CMC
- Producer: Overkill

Overkill chronology
!!!Fuck You!!! and Then Some (1997)	From the Underground and Below (1997)	Necroshine (1999)

Professional ratings
Review scores
Source	Rating
AllMusic	3/5 stars
Kerrang!	3/5 stars
Rock Hard	8.5/10

From the Underground and Below is the ninth studio album by thrash metal band Overkill, released in 1997 by CMC International. Two cover songs were recorded during these sessions: "No Feelings" by Sex Pistols and "Space Truckin'" by Deep Purple. Lead singer Bobby "Blitz" Ellsworth considers From the Underground and Below to be one of his favorite Overkill albums.

The album was re-issued along with Necroshine (1999) as part of a box set in 2003.

== Track listing ==
All tracks are written by Bobby "Blitz" Ellsworth and D.D. Verni except where noted.

No.	Title	Length
1.	"It Lives"	4:31
2.	"Save Me"	4:56
3.	"Long Time Dyin'"	4:53
4.	"Genocya"	4:46
5.	"Half Past Dead"	5:29
6.	"F.U.C.T."	4:56
7.	"I'm Alright"	5:49
8.	"The Rip n' Tear"	4:18
9.	"Promises"	4:49
10.	"Little Bit o' Murder"	4:09
Total length:		47:07

Japanese bonus track
No.	Title	Writer(s)	Length
11.	"Space Truckin' (Deep Purple cover)"	Ian Gillan, Ian Anderson Paice, Jon Lord, Ritchie Blackmore, Roger David Glover	4:00
Total length:			51:07

== Credits ==
- Bobby "Blitz" Ellsworth – lead vocals
- D.D. Verni – bass, backing vocals
- Sebastian Marino – guitar
- Joe Comeau – guitar, vocals
- Tim Mallare – drums

=== Additional personnel ===
- Produced by Overkill
- Mixed by Colin Richardson
- Tracking and mix engineer: Andy Katz
- Mastered by Howie Weinberg at Masterdisk, New York City
- Pre-production at Gear Rehearsal Studios, Shrewsbury, New Jersey
- Demos recorded by Filthy Tracks Studio, Rochester

== Charts ==
Chart (1997)	Peak position
US Top Heatseekers (Billboard)	34
