= Merritt Gant =

- Merritt Gant on stage with Overkill in the early 1990s

Background information
- Born: 18 February 1971 (age 55); Millville, New Jersey, United States
- Genres: Heavy metal, thrash metal
- Occupations: Musician
- Instruments: Guitar
- Years active: 1980s-present

Merritt Gant (born February 18, 1971) is an American guitarist most recognized for his association with the band Overkill.

Originally from Millville, New Jersey, Gant graduated from Millville Senior High School in 1989.

In the late 1980s, Gant entered the local music scene with hard rock band Drastic Measures. During Gant's tenure with Drastic Measures, one full-length album and one demo were released. In 1989, Gant was recruited by Chris Bombeke to play guitar with Faith or Fear. However, shortly after doing a series of shows and recording several songs with Faith or Fear, Gant auditioned and was hired to play for the thrash metal band Overkill.

In 1990, Overkill held auditions to replace departing guitarist Bobby Gustafson. Gustafson was replaced by two guitarists, Gant and Rob Cannavino . From 1990 to 1995, Gant toured and recorded on the albums Horrorscope, I Hear Black, W.F.O., and the live album Wrecking Your Neck. Gant appeared in several music videos featured on MTV, including the thrash metal anthem "Horrorscope." In 1995, Gant and Cannavino both left Overkill.

After leaving Overkill, Gant's involvement in the music industry evolved beyond being just a guitar player. Gant currently plays, engineers, and produces music in several bands, including his experimental music project Blood Audio. In 2001, Blood Audio released Bludgeoning Timbre and in 2003, Null Evil. In 2009, Gant also laid down several guitar tracks for New Jersey band, Dearly Beloved. In addition to being a recording artist, Gant is also a guitar instructor, producer and sound engineer, and an accomplished repairman and restorer of vintage and modern electric and acoustic guitars and other stringed instruments. In June 2009, "Faith or Fear" released a new album, Instruments of Death, featuring Gant on four previously unreleased tracks recorded in 1990.

Since then, he has settled down in southern New Jersey with his two children. He owns & operates a music learning center & recording studio in his hometown. Gant also teaches Audio Engineering at Cumberland County College. He has been a resident of Maurice River Township, New Jersey.

== Discography ==
=== Studio albums ===
Overkill

- Horrorscope (1991)
- I Hear Black (1993)
- W.F.O. (1994)
- Wrecking Your Neck (1995)

Blood Audio

- Bludgeoning Timbre (2001)
- Null Evil (2003)

Faith or Fear

- Instruments of Death (2009)
