= The Killing Kind (album) =

1996 studio album by Overkill

Studio album by Overkill
- Released: March 5, 1996
- Recorded: September–October 1995
- Studio: Carriage House Studio, Stamford, Connecticut
- Genre: Thrash metal; groove metal
- Length: 49:56
- Label: CMC
- Producer: Overkill

Overkill chronology
Wrecking Your Neck (1995)	The Killing Kind (1996)	!!!Fuck You!!! and Then Some (1996)

Professional ratings
Review scores
Source	Rating
AllMusic	4/5 stars
Rock Hard	9/10

The Killing Kind is the eighth studio album by thrash metal band Overkill, released in 1996. It was the first album to feature new guitarists Joe Comeau and Sebastian Marino, and was released on CMC International, whereas their previous studio albums were released by either Megaforce or Atlantic Records.

== Overview ==
In 1995, both guitarists Rob Cannavino and Merritt Gant decided to leave Overkill. Overkill then hired Joe Comeau, former singer of the band Liege Lord (now playing guitar). Comeau brought along former Anvil guitarist Sebastian Marino, with whom he had worked with in the past. This new line up recorded The Killing Kind in 1995. It was self-produced and mixed by Chris Tsangarides (Judas Priest, Helloween).

While staying well within the thrash genre, the album was a departure from its predecessor's more traditional thrash metal style and featured many modern elements, such as hardcore and groove metal, while vocally some influences were drawn from outside the rock and metal genres. Since Comeau was also a singer, backing vocals on The Killing Kind and subsequent albums were more elaborate and frequent than before, adding another new element to the band's sound.

== Reception ==
Press response to The Killing Kind was positive.

== Touring ==
Overkill toured Europe twice in support of The Killing Kind, first in February 1996 with Megora and Accu§er, and then again in November with Anvil and Stahlhammer.

== Track listing ==
- All tracks written by Bobby "Blitz" Ellsworth and D.D. Verni.

No.	Title	Length
1.	"Battle"	4:31
2.	"God-Like"	4:11
3.	"Certifiable"	3:25
4.	"Burn You Down/To Ashes"	6:47
5.	"Let Me Shut That for You"	5:19
6.	"Bold Face Pagan Stomp"	5:42
7.	"Feeding Frenzy (Instrumental)"	4:13
8.	"The Cleansing"	5:50
9.	"The Mourning After/Private Bleeding"	4:36
10.	"Cold, Hard Fact"	5:19
Total length:		49:56

== Personnel ==
- Bobby "Blitz" Ellsworth – lead vocals
- D.D. Verni – bass, backing vocals
- Sebastian Marino – guitar
- Joe Comeau – guitar, vocals
- Tim Mallare – drums

=== Production ===
- Recorded September–October 1995 at Carriage House Studio, Stamford, Connecticut
- Produced by Overkill
- Mixed by Chris Tsangarides and Overkill
- Engineered by Andy Katz, John Montagnese, and Phil Magnotti
- Mastered by Howie Weinberg at Masterdisk, New York City

== Sampling ==
- The audio samples for the song "Battle" were taken from the 1992 film Batman Returns. The dialog is from a scene between Selina Kyle (Michelle Pfeiffer) and Max Shreck (Christopher Walken).
