= Wisp =

Wisp or WISP may refer to:

== Acronyms ==
- Wartime Information Security Program
- WISP (particle physics), Weakly Interacting Sub-eV Particle or Weakly Interacting Slender Particle in hypothetical quantum mechanics
- WISP1, WISP2, and WISP3, the human genes encoding the WNT1 Inducible Signaling Pathway proteins 1, 2, and 3
- Wireless Internet service provider, is an Internet Service Provider (ISP) that provides connectivity via WLAN
- Wireless identification and sensing platform (WISP) is a software-configurable passive UHF RFID tag

== Mythology and fiction ==
- Night wisp, a fictional creature in the Sword of Truth series by Terry Goodkind
- Wisp, the birth name of a fictional young orphan girl who would later become known as Rainbow Brite
- Wisp, a nature spirit associated with the Night Elf race in the MMORPG World of Warcraft
- Wisp (Sonic), the alien race in the Sonic the Hedgehog games

== Other uses ==
- WISP (AM), a radio station (1570 AM) licensed to Doylestown, Pennsylvania, United States
- Wisp (musician), stage name of American singer and songwriter Natalie R. Lu (born 2004)
- Wisp, an electronic musician signed to Rephlex Records
- Wisp Ski Resort, in western Maryland
- Colgate Wisp, a single-use toothbrush
- Agriocnemis, a genus of damselfly commonly known as a wisp

== See also ==
- Will-o'-the-wisp (disambiguation)
