= Smilo (band) =

Swedish electronic dance music trio

- Also known as: Smajling Swedes; SMAJL
- Origin: Sweden
- Genres: EDM, Synth-pop, Electropop
- Years active: 2014–present
- Members: Arvid Ångström; Dennis Babic; Oscar Berglund Juhola

Smilo (previously known as Smajling Swedes and SMAJL) is a Swedish electronic dance music trio, consisting of Arvid Ångström, Dennis Babic, and Oscar Berglund Juhola.

The group released their debut single "Warfare" in 2014 under the name "SMAJL" but later changed their name to "Smajling Swedes". In 2015, they competed in Svensktoppen nästa with the song "Goosebumps" and were handpicked to compete in Melodifestivalen 2016.

They later changed their name once again to "Smilo" and performed in the third semi-final of Melodifestivalen 2016 with the song "Weight of the World", where they placed fifth and were eliminated from the competition. The song has since peaked at number-57 on Sverigetopplistan.

== Members ==
- Arvid Ångström — born 1 February 1993 (age 32) in Örnsköldsvik
- Dennis Babic — born 25 December 1992 (age 32) in Vendelsö
- Oscar Berglund Juhola — born 6 May 1992 (age 33) in Vendelsö

== Discography ==
=== Singles ===
Title	Year	Peak chart positions	Certifications	Album
Title	Year	SWE	Certifications	Album
"Warfare"	2014	—		Non-album singles
"Goosebumps"	2015	—		Non-album singles
"Weight of the World"	2016	42	GLF: Gold	Non-album singles
"—" denotes a single that did not chart or was not released in that territory.
