= Irrlicht =

Irrlicht may refer to:

- Irrlicht, the German name for will-o'-the-wisp, the ghostly light sometimes seen at night over bogs and swamps
- "Irrlicht", the ninth song in the Winterreise cycle by Franz Schubert
- Irrlicht (album), by Klaus Schulze
- Irrlicht Engine, a 3D computer graphics engine
- Die Irrlichter, a German medieval/fantasy/folk band
- Irrlicht (film), a 1919 German silent film
