= Window on the World (disambiguation) =

Window on the World was a 1949 American variety show.

Windows on the World was a restaurant at the top of the North Tower, Building One of the original World Trade Center

Window on the World or Windows on the World may also refer to:

- Windows on the World (film), a 2019 film starring Edward James Olmos
- Windows on the World (novel), a 2005 novel by Frederic Beigbeder
- "The Windows of the World" (song), a song by Dionne Warwick
- BBC Two "Window on the World" idents
- The Window on the World, an old subtitle in the early years of the BBC series Panorama
- Window on the World, a 2011 novel by Hugh Cornwell
- A studio at NBC headquarters complex in New York City, designed by Randy Falco

== See also ==
- Window to the World (WTTW), a public television station
- Window of the World, a theme park in Shenzhen, China
