= Will-o'-the-wisp (disambiguation) =

A will-o'-the-wisp is a pale blue atmospheric ghost light sometimes seen at night over bogs and swamps.

Will-o'-the-wisp may also refer to:

== Arts and entertainment ==
=== Characters ===
- Will o' the Wisp (comics), a Marvel comic book supervillain physicist
- Will-o'-wisp (Dungeons & Dragons), a malevolent entity in Dungeons & Dragons
- Will o' the wisps, fictional characters in the 2012 animated film Brave

=== Music ===
- "Song Of The Will-o'-the-Wisp" (Canción del fuego fatuo), from El amor brujo, a ballet composed in 1914–15 by Manuel de Falla to a libretto by Gregorio Martínez Sierra
  - Recorded by Miles Davis on the 1960 album Sketches of Spain
- Transcendental Etude No. 5 (Liszt), also known as Wills o' the Wisp
- Irrlicht (album) (German for "Will o' the Wisp"), a 1972 album by Klaus Schulze
- Will O' the Wisp (album), a 1975 album by Leon Russell, and its title track
- Will 'O' The Wisp, a song in the 1975 album Beginnings by Steve Howe
- Will-O-The-Wisp, a 1997 album by Claw Boys Claw
- Will o' the Wisp, a song from Opeth's 2016 album Sorceress
- "Will O' The Wisp", from by Blackmore's Night from the 2015 album All Our Yesterdays
- "Will-o-the-wisp", from the Pet Shop Boys' 2020 album Hotspot

=== Other arts and entertainment ===
- Peggy, the Will O' the Wisp, a 1917 film
- Will-o'-the-Wisp (film), a 2022 Portuguese film
- Will O' the Wisp (novel), a 1931 novel by Pierre Drieu La Rochelle
- "Will o' the Wisp", a 1999 episode of children's television show So Weird
- Willo the Wisp, a British cartoon series originally produced in 1981
- Ori and the Will of the Wisps, a 2020 video game and sequel to Ori and the Blind Forest
- The Will-O'-The-Wisp, a 1947 novel by Baroness Orczy

== People ==
- Willie Fleming (born 1939), professional Canadian football player nicknamed "Will o' the Wisp"
- Jeff Hardy (born 1977), American professional wrestler who had the ring name "Willow the Whisp"
- Willie Pep (1922–2006), American boxer nicknamed "Will o' the Wisps"

== Other uses ==
- Ignis Fatuus, a haunted ship attraction at Morey's Piers
- SS Will of the Wisp a Confederate blockade running steamer
- Will-o'-the-wisp, a variation of Spiderette solitaire game

== See also ==
- Irrlicht (disambiguation), the German name for will-o'-the-wisp
