= I Hear Black =

1993 studio album by Overkill

Studio album by Overkill
- Released: March 9, 1993
- Recorded: 1992
- Studios: Pyramid (Ithaca, New York)
- Genre: Groove metal
- Length: 51:38
- Label: Atlantic
- Producers: Alex Perialas, Overkill

Overkill chronology
| Horrorscope (1991) | I Hear Black (1993) | W.F.O. (1994) |

I Hear Black is the sixth studio album by thrash metal band Overkill, released on March 9, 1993, by Atlantic Records. It was the band's first to feature drummer Tim Mallare. It saw the band slow their sound down, moving into a groove metal direction.

== Overview ==
I Hear Black was produced by Alex Perialas, who had previously worked with Overkill in the late 1980s, and was the band's first album released directly through Atlantic Records, whereas their previous albums were co-released by Megaforce.

The album once again presented a change in style for the band, from the up-tempo thrash of Horrorscope to a more groove metal style. The result was a metal album which had a much darker feel to it, incorporating Black Sabbath-influenced blues, doom and stoner tones, although the album retained many of their traditional thrash metal roots. The change of style from thrash to groove metal can be seen as a genesis of the experimentation that would continue into most of Overkill's 1990s and 2000s output.

The European leg of the 1993 "World of Hurt Tour" featured Savatage as a support act. A music video was made for the track "Spiritual Void" but it saw very little airplay due to the decline of metal in the mainstream. This album and W.F.O. were re-released on Wounded Bird Records in 2005.

At the beginning of the supporting tour the band played eight songs from the album live. However, the songs were quickly dropped from the setlist, and none have been performed since 2002.

== Reception ==
Professional ratings
Review scores
| Source | Rating |
|---|---|
| AllMusic | 3/5 stars |
| Rock Hard | 7.5/10 |

AllMusic's Jason Anderson gave the album a positive review, awarding it three stars out of five and stating, "After releasing perhaps the finest, most musical recording of the band's already considerable thrash metal career in 1991, Overkill followed up Horrorscope in 1993 with I Hear Black, a slightly more dense, ambitious recording, and the band's first for Atlantic Records." Anderson then added, "While not an important release for its genre or even for the band, Overkill's I Hear Black is still a respectable post-thrash offering."

I Hear Black was one of Overkill's most successful albums to date, as it got their fourth-highest chart position (behind three of their 2010s albums The Electric Age, White Devil Armory and The Grinding Wheel), debuting at #122 on the Billboard 200 charts. The album also gave Overkill their highest ever chart position on the Billboard Heatseekers, peaking at number three.

== Track listing ==
- All tracks written by Bobby "Blitz" Ellsworth and D.D. Verni except where noted.

| No. | Title | Writer(s) | Length |
|---|---|---|---|
| 1. | "Dreaming in Columbian" | Ellsworth/Verni/Gant | 4:00 |
| 2. | "I Hear Black" | | 5:37 |
| 3. | "World of Hurt" | | 5:19 |
| 4. | "Feed My Head" | | 5:36 |
| 5. | "Shades of Grey" | | 5:19 |
| 6. | "Spiritual Void" | | 5:13 |
| 7. | "Ghost Dance" (instrumental) | | 1:46 |
| 8. | "Weight of the World" | | 4:07 |
| 9. | "Ignorance and Innocence" | | 5:00 |
| 10. | "Undying" | | 5:25 |
| 11. | "Just Like You" | Ellsworth/Verni/Cannavino | 4:13 |
| Total length: | | | 51:38 |

Japanese edition bonus track
| No. | Title | Length |
|---|---|---|
| 12. | "Killogy" | 3:11 |
| Total length: | | 54:49 |

== Usage ==
- "World of Hurt" was featured as an unlockable song on the heavy metal-themed video game Brütal Legend.

== Personnel ==
- Bobby "Blitz" Ellsworth – lead vocals
- D.D. Verni – bass, backing vocals
- Merritt Gant – guitars, backing vocals
- Rob Cannavino – guitars, backing vocals
- Tim Mallare – drums

== Additional personnel ==
- Produced by Alex Perialas and Overkill
- Engineered by Rob Hunter and Alex Perialas
- Mastered by Tom Coyne at Hit Factory

== Charts ==
| Chart (1993) | Peak position |
|---|---|
| US Billboard 200 | 122 |
| US Heatseekers Albums (Billboard) | 3 |
