= Bobby Gustafson =

American guitarist (born 1965)

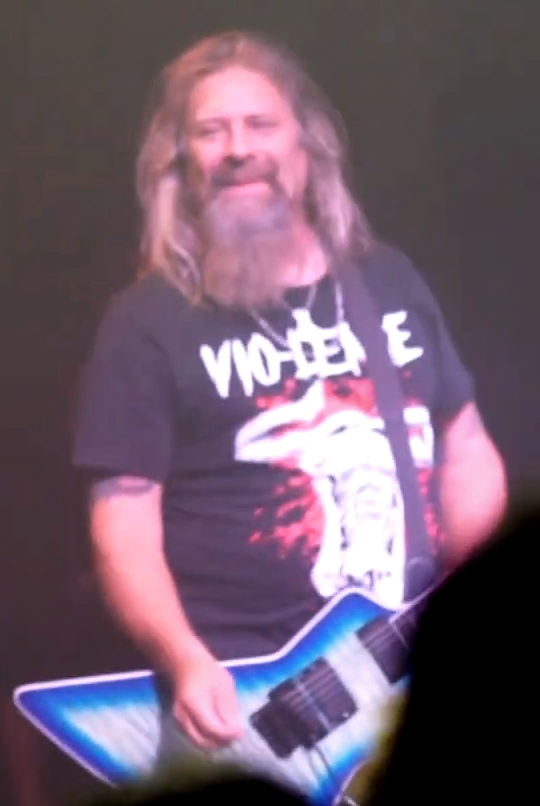
- Gustafson with Vio-lence in 2022

Background information
- Born: July 15, 1965 (age 61); Staten Island, New York, U.S.
- Genres: Thrash metal
- Occupation: Guitarist
- Years active: 1981–present
- Member of: Satans Taint
- Formerly of: Overkill, Skrew, Grip Inc., Vio-lence

Robert Wayne Gustafson (born July 15, 1965) is an American musician, best known as the former guitarist of the New Jersey-based thrash metal band Overkill from 1982 until his split with the band in 1990. He was also the rhythm guitarist for thrash metal band Vio-lence from 2020 to 2022.

== Career ==
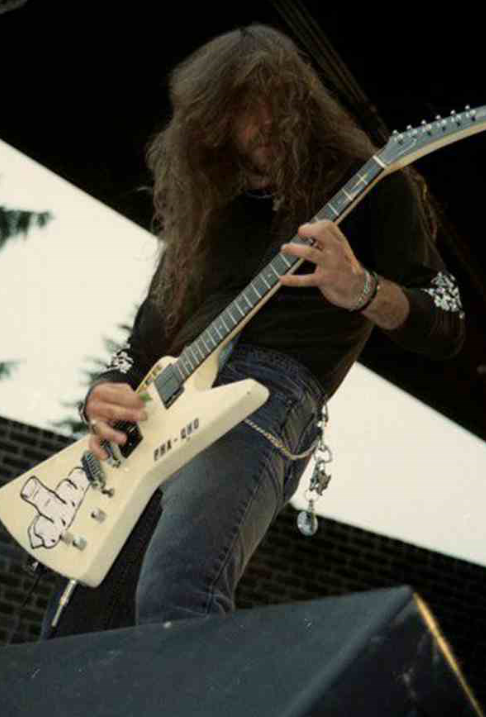
Gustafson in 1990

Bobby Gustafson joined Overkill at 17 years old after an audition, when the band was still playing only covers, coming from the garage band The Dropouts. He stimulated the other members to produce original music and was a key member in the Overkill quartet, having been a composer from the band's debut album Feel the Fire in 1985 to their most commercially successful album, The Years of Decay, in 1989.

Accounts vary regarding Gustafson's split from Overkill in 1990: he was either fired by its founding members Bobby "Blitz" Ellsworth and D. D. Verni or had left after Verni tried to remove him from the band via management. Gustafson had continued to feud with Ellsworth and Verni within the next two-and-a-half decades, and claimed on his Facebook account in March 2018 that he had not received his share of royalties for his songs with Overkill. When asked in March 2020 interview with Diabolus in Podcastica if he would ever work with both Gustafson and Rat Skates again, Ellsworth said, "It's not a problem for me. I don't think it'd be a problem with Bobby Gustafson. I don't have a problem with him. He has a problem with me; I don't have a problem with him. But it would have to be the other person being able to say, 'Hey, I'd like to do this.' But I think Rat's taken different life choices at this point. I can't speak for the man, but I don't think this is his thing anymore. But would it be nice to see him? Of course it would."

Following the release of the second Overkill album Taking Over (1987), Gustafson was approached by Megadeth co-founder and band-leader Dave Mustaine to join his band, following trouble with their lineup at the time. However, Gustafson rejected the proposal, feeling that Overkill was turning big. Gustafson claimed in a 2020 interview on Exodus frontman Steve "Zetro" Souza's Toxic Vault podcast that he auditioned for Metallica as James Hetfield's temporary replacement, following the latter's recovery from being burned onstage during their 1992 tour with Guns N' Roses, but lost this position to then-Metal Church guitarist and one-time Metallica guitar technician John Marshall.

Immediately after the split with Overkill, Gustafson went on tour with Cycle Sluts from Hell in Europe. Gustafson later tried to form a side-project with Exodus drummer Tom Hunting called I4NI. He was also a member of Grip Inc., but did not record anything with them.

He played in the industrial metal band Skrew album Shadow of Doubt in 1996, replacing their guitarist for the recording of the album. He then relocated in Florida and left the music business for a while.

Gustafson returned to the music industry in 2003 by joining the Florida-based band Response Negative, and has released two albums under the moniker Satans Taint: Axe to the Head of My Enemies (2017) and Destruction Ritual (2019). He has also worked for his family plumbing business in Florida.

On January 27, 2020, it was announced that Gustafson would be temporarily filling in for Ray Vegas in Vio-lence. He was eventually confirmed as a permanent member of the band, and appeared on their first song in more than two decades, a cover of Dead Kennedys' "California über alles". Gustafson also appears on the band's EP Let the World Burn (2022).
