= Weight of the World (Smilo song) =

Single by Smilo
- Released: 28 February 2016
- Genre: EDM; synth-pop
- Length: 2:52
- Label: Universal Music Sweden
- Songwriter(s): Smilo; Anton Göransson; Robin Danielsson

Smilo singles chronology
"Goosebumps" (2015)	"Weight of the World" (2016)

"Weight of the World" is a song by Swedish EDM trio Smilo. The song was released in Sweden as a digital download on 28 February 2016, and was written by Smilo along with Anton Göransson and Robin Danielsson. It took part in Melodifestivalen 2016, and placed fifth in the third semi-final.

== Track listing ==
Digital download
No.	Title	Length
1.	"Weight of the World"	2:52

== Chart performance ==
Chart (2016)	Peak position
Sweden (Sverigetopplistan)	42

== Certifications ==
Region	Certification	Certified units/sales
Sweden (GLF)	Gold	4,000,000^{†}
^{†} Streaming-only figures based on certification alone.

== Release history ==
Region	Date	Format	Label
Sweden	28 February 2016	Digital download	Universal Music Sweden
