= Horrorscope (Overkill album) =

1991 studio album by Overkill

Studio album by Overkill
- Released: September 3, 1991
- Recorded: March–April 1991
- Studios: Carriage House (Stamford, Connecticut)
- Genre: Thrash metal
- Length: 53:01
- Labels: Atlantic, Megaforce
- Producers: Overkill, Terry Date

Overkill chronology
The Years of Decay (1989)	Horrorscope (1991)	I Hear Black (1993)

Horrorscope is the fifth studio album by thrash metal band Overkill, released on September 3, 1991, through Atlantic and Megaforce Records. It was the first Overkill album to feature the duo of guitarists Merritt Gant and Rob Cannavino, and the last to be released through Megaforce, although they remained on Atlantic until 1995. Like its predecessor, The Years of Decay (1989), Horrorscope was produced by Terry Date. The album's cover was also the first to display the band's logo in a different color, which is orange instead of green.

== Overview ==
Following the departure of longtime guitarist and songwriter Bobby Gustafson, who left or was fired from the band amid a feud with its founding members Bobby "Blitz" Ellsworth (vocals) and D. D. Verni (bass), Overkill added two new guitarists in Cannavino (who had been Gustafson's guitar technician) and Gant (previously from thrash metal band Faith or Fear). Drummer Sid Falck left the band during the Horrorscope tour in 1992, and was replaced by former M.O.D. drummer Tim Mallare.

== Reception ==
Professional ratings
Review scores
Source	Rating
AllMusic	4.5/5 stars
Rock Hard	8.5/10

AllMusic's Eduardo Rivadavia gave Horrorscope a positive review, awarding it 4.5 stars out of five and stating, "The insecurity felt among Overkill fans by the departure of founding guitarist and key songwriter Bobby Gustafson in 1990 ultimately proved unfounded when the New York thrashers' expanded two-guitar lineup—featuring Rob Cannavino and Merritt Gant—arguably delivered the finest effort of the group's career in 1991's Horrorscope."

The album reached No. 29 on the U.S. Billboard Heatseekers chart and as of 2010 remains Overkill's best-selling album of the Nielsen SoundScan era, having sold over 120,000 copies in the U.S. Promo singles were released for "Coma" and "Infectious", while the cover version of "Frankenstein" got airplay on modern rock stations, most notably on KNAC-FM in Los Angeles. Despite never being released as singles, there were music videos for "Horrorscope" and "Thanx for Nothin'", both of which received airplay on MTV's Headbangers Ball.

== Track listing ==
All tracks are written by Overkill, except where noted

No.	Title	Length
1.	"Coma"	5:23
2.	"Infectious"	4:04
3.	"Blood Money"	4:07
4.	"Thanx for Nothin'"	4:07
5.	"Bare Bones"	4:52
6.	"Horrorscope"	5:49
7.	"New Machine"	5:18
8.	"Frankenstein" (Edgar Winter; instrumental)	3:28
9.	"Live Young, Die Free"	4:11
10.	"Nice Day... for a Funeral"	6:17
11.	"Soulitude"	5:25
Total length:		53:01

== Personnel ==
- Bobby "Blitz" Ellsworth – lead vocals
- D.D. Verni – bass, backing vocals
- Merritt Gant – guitars, backing vocals
- Rob Cannavino – guitars, acoustic guitars, backing vocals
- Sid Falck – drums

Production

- Bobby "Blitz" Ellsworth – production
- Merritt Gant – production
- Rob Cannavino – production
- Terry Date – engineering, production
- Matt Lane – engineering assistance
- Howie Weinberg – mastering
- Jon Zazula – executive producer
- Marsha Zazula – executive producer

== Charts ==
Chart (1991)	Peak position
US Top Heatseekers (Billboard)	29
