= Rat Skates =

American musician and film producer

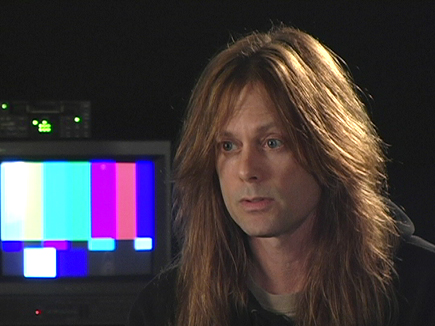
- Skates filming in New Jersey, 2007

Background information
- Born: Lee John Kundrat; May 17, 1961 (age 64); Summit, New Jersey, U.S.
- Genres: Heavy metal, thrash metal, speed metal, rock
- Occupations: Director, producer, screenwriter, musician
- Instrument: Drums
- Years active: 1979–present
- Formerly of: Overkill, The Lubricunts, Bomb Squad
- Website: ratskates.com

Lee Kundrat (born May 17, 1961), known professionally as Rat Skates, is an American filmmaker, writer and musician. He is best known as a director of music documentaries and his contributions to the thrash metal genre as a founding member and the original drummer of Overkill.

== Early life ==
Rat Skates grew up in a conservative middle-class household in New Providence, New Jersey, where he attended school, played sports and drew artwork. By age ten, he was listening to music daily from the Beatles' Sgt. Pepper's Lonely Hearts Club Band and Elton John during his Goodbye Yellow Brick Road era. He achieved semi-professional status as a skateboarder and was sponsored by surf shops in Seaside Heights, New Jersey. He won first and second places in freestyle, slalom, and ramp competitions. His friends dubbed him with the nickname "Rat Skates" combining part of his last name and skateboarding.

At age 15, he studied jazz drumming techniques with instructor Jack Robertello, and taught himself to play the drum parts of songs performed by rock drummers Cliff Davies, Joey Kramer, John Bonham and Peter Criss. Skates met Carlo Verni (later known as D.D. Blaze, then D.D. Verni) in New Providence High School in 1976, and they formed a punk group known as The Lubricunts. At age 17, they played the nightclubs CBGB, Great Gildersleeves, Max's Kansas City, Trudy Heller's, Bottany Talk House, The Mudd Club and The Showplace.

While he was working at his first post-high school job as a graphic artist and printing press operator at RC Graphics in Caldwell, New Jersey, Skates met the Misfits founder/bassist Jerry Only while he was delivering printed materials to Pro Edge, the knife blade factory owned by Only's father where Only also worked. Only booked a recording session to have Skates play drums on a Misfits recording, but Skates could not use his mother's car to make it to the session. He worked as a stock boy in the Summit Food Market to re-pay his mother who loaned him money to purchase a Ludwig double bass drum kit. In 1980, the Lubricunts disbanded.

== Career with Overkill ==
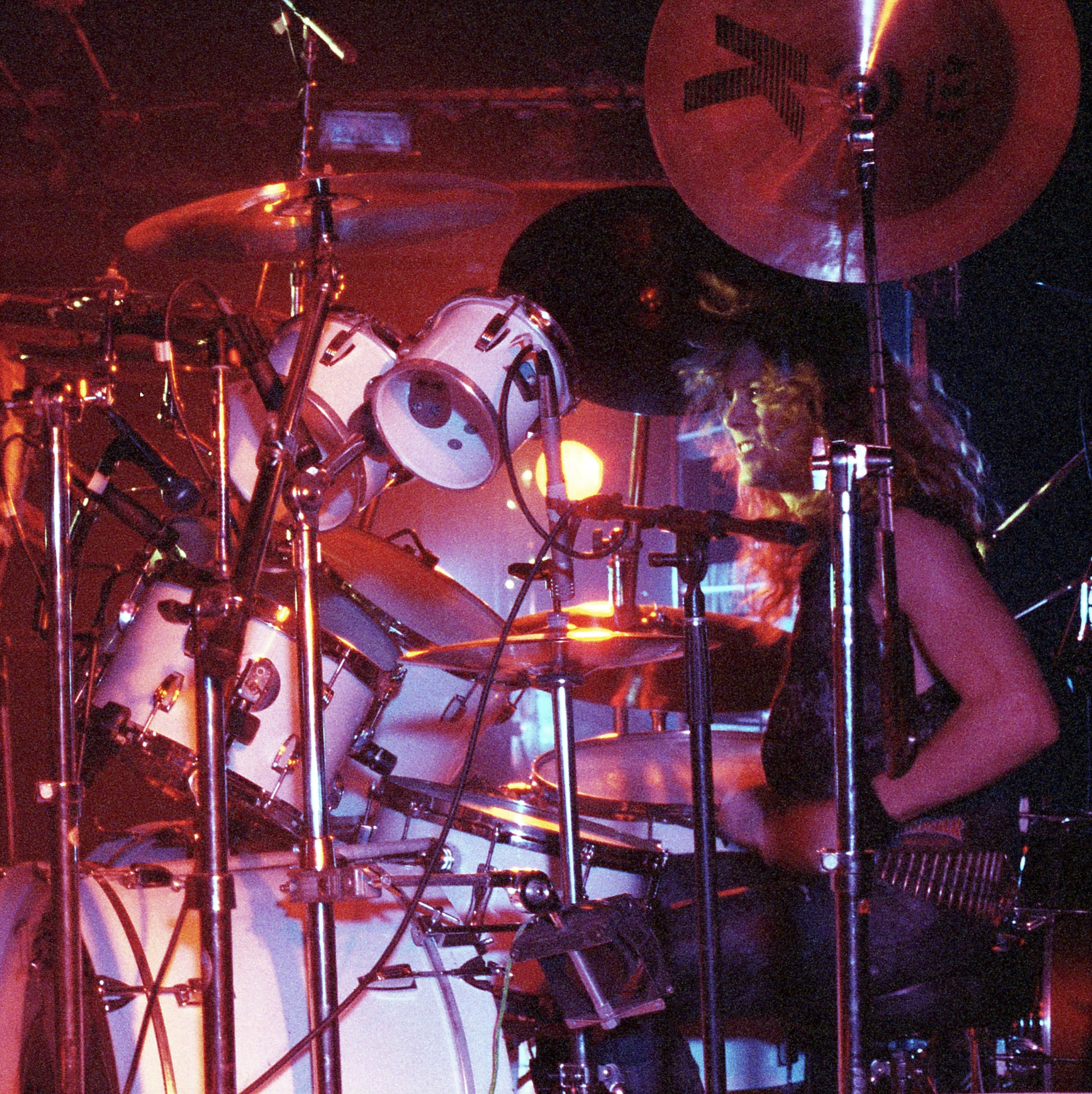
Skates with Overkill in 1986

Skates placed an advertisement in The Aquarian Weekly newspaper to locate new heavy metal musicians that was answered by guitarist Robert Pisarek (who became known as Riff Thunder), bringing with him bassist/vocalist Robert Ellsworth (who became known as Bobby Blitz) who were members of a cover rock group known as D.O.A. They temporarily named themselves Virgin Killer, after the Scorpions' record of the same name, and permanently changed their name to Overkill which Pisarek selected from the title of a Motörhead record of the same name.

Skates and Verni envisioned and implemented a theatrical, horror-oriented theme for Overkill, using visual elements from Kiss, Misfits, Alice Cooper, Twisted Sister, and an unsigned club band from Pennsylvania named The Dead End Kids. From 1981 to 1984, he participated in the underground new wave of British heavy metal cassette tape-trading circuit that was shared between North America and Europe, that was the foundation for Metallica, Slayer, Megadeth, Exodus to evolve into the genre known as thrash metal. Skates promoted Overkill by creating the components he deemed essential to the success of national recording acts that included: creating stage name banners made with slide projectors and magic markers, modifying ornaments from Halloween costumes into stage clothing and stage props, silk-screening T-shirts, a castle-dungeon stage design made of hand-textured Styrofoam walls and supported by milk crates, rubber stamping the Overkill logo on guitar picks and drum sticks for fan souvenirs, and advertising with rubber-stamped stickers placed on highway toll booths.

In March and September 1983, Skates co-composed five original songs for a demo tape titled Power in Black. He dubbed individual cassette-tape copies for selling and to solicit for a recording contract, used a Xerox photocopier in a library to create a two-sided cover, and shrink wrapped copies using plastic film used to make fruit baskets and a hair dryer to include in their press kit. This resulted in offers he accepted for Overkill to place songs on two compilation LP records: Metal Massacre V, and New York Metal '84 and accepted an offer from Azra/ Metalstorm Records to distribute a four-song EP record contingent upon his delivery of self-financed recordings and print-ready mechanical artwork.

Skates established a relationship with Jon and Marsha Zazula in 1982 by mutual acquaintances of the Old Bridge Militia, an assembly of heavy metal fans and roadies who were providing their home for musicians Dave Mustaine, James Hetfield, Lars Ulrich and Cliff Burton to live. The Zazula's were proprietors of Rock 'n Roll Heaven, an import specialty record store located within the Route 18 Flea Market in East Brunswick, New Jersey. Assisted by band photographer and merchandiser Lori DeAngelis, he sold one thousand Power In Black cassette tapes from Rock 'n Roll Heaven on a consignment basis in eleven months. In 1982, the Zazulas formed Megaforce Records, which debuted L.P. record albums from Metallica, Raven, Anthrax, Exciter, Manowar and Talas. The Zazulas recognized the unit sales of Power in Black through Rock 'n Roll Heaven and by Skates' international marketing, and they presented him with a four-album recording contract offer that Skates accepted and was signed by the members of Overkill on April 10, 1985.

From 1985 to 1987 Skates arranged and co-wrote two full-length studio LP records: Feel the Fire (Megaforce) and Taking Over (Megaforce/ Atlantic), which debuted at number 191 on the Billboard Top 200 on April 11, 1987. He implemented the song "Fuck You!" by The Subhumans that was embodied in a live/ studio EP of the same name. He toured for these records in North America, Germany, Belgium, Denmark, Switzerland, Great Britain, Poland, France, Holland and Austria as thrash metal bands experienced exponential growth during these years. Skates became inundated with touring and recording commitments, and stated that the close-mindedness of some band members was suppressing Overkill's success, and the inability to satisfy his work ethics resulted in deep depression, excessive sleeping and alcoholism. He refused to meet the commitments required by a recording artist employed within the recording industry, and he announced his departure in Los Angeles in the fall of 1987 while completing a tour with Megadeth.

=== Legacy ===
Overkill's early success has been attributed to Skates' songwriting presence and creative efforts. He was voted one of the top-ten drummers of 1987 by the Japanese publication Burrn!, and his drumming on the songs "There's No Tomorrow" and "Feel the Fire" were the first recorded songs in the thrash metal genre to encompass non-continuous 16th note double bass drum patterns. The Overkill logo was drawn and colored lime green by Skates in 1981, and is recognized as one of the most famous heavy metal logos. He noted that when he removed the cross emblem from between the words in his original logo design, he never connected the two words "Over" and "Kill" together, and that is it was never resolved as being a one-word or two-word name, suggesting that Lemmy from Motörhead would know the answer. Skates declined offers to join Megadeth, M.O.D. and Mind Funk; he never attempted to return to Overkill and stated that his only regret was "being naïve to trust".

== Other musical ventures ==
In 1988, Skates wrote Some Stuff I Recorded, a ten-song demo of ideas to share with other musicians for a new project, where he played bass, drums, keyboards and vocals while intoxicated. This songwriting was recognized by Japan's Burrn! magazine, as three songs from this effort debuted as numbers 1, 2 and 3 on their top ten charts in July 1988. These compositions were re-recorded under the name Bone To Bone with guitarist Jules Asilo, bassist Kevin Drexler, saxophonist Jim Riccio, and former bandmate Bobby Blitz on vocals. Skates also recorded a country-pop project Ten Mile Road to Hell with Nashville-based composer/guitarist Eric Cook in 1989.

From 1988 to 1996, Skates established a career as a percussion instructor through both private instruction and the New Jersey Percussion Center in Rockaway, New Jersey. During this period, he performed in public drum clinics and studied Gary Chester's book The New Breed through private studies with rock and jazz fusion drummer Karl Latham.

In February 1990, Skates accepted an offer to join Bomb Squad, a rock/metal group of New Jersey musicians that was affiliated with The Old Bridge Militia. He states that Bomb Squad was the most enjoyable musical experience to-date, and the pinnacle of his songwriting and drumming. In 1993, a pending record contract between Bomb Squad and MCA Records collapsed. Vocalist John Poper and bassist Michael Bloomer departed, and Skates and guitarist John Crothers continued on briefly with vocalist Mario Lanuza before completely disbanding in 1993.

== Filmmaking ==
Skates freelanced for the Suburban Cablevision television network as an audio engineer, live mixer and cameraman from 1988 to 1992; departing due to creative conflicts. In 1999, he studied digital audio production and non-linear editing from Trish and Chris Meyer, Jay Rose, and Adam Wilt, and designed and wrote advertising media for television, radio, print publications, performing arts societies, Fortune 500 companies, record labels and recording artists. As an independent filmmaker, he co-produced, edited and animated designs for the documentary Get Thrashed (2008, Lightyear/Warner Bros. Entertainment) and Born in the Basement (2007, MVD Entertainment Group), receiving twenty-one screenings in eight countries, winning six awards and pay-per-view broadcasting.

Skates conceptualized Rock-Un-Rold, a musician's television talk show with colleague David Ellefson (bassist, Megadeth), and filmed a demo shoot at The Studio in New York City on October 28, 2007. They moderated two discussion panels of six recording artists and pitched an edited version to a Viacom representative who declined the concept due to the content being "too intelligent". In response, Skates began filming interviews in 2009 for the documentary film Welcome to the Dream - The Rude Awakening of Rock Stardom for release by the MVD Entertainment Group in 2012. The films preview teaser excerpts interviews from Vernon Reid (Living Colour), Mike Portnoy (Dream Theater), Anvil, Jay Jay French (Twisted Sister), Karl Wilcox (Diamond Head), Dr. Patricia Basczcuk (Psychologist) and Robert J. Pisarek, Esq. (Attorney), and an excerpt from his commissioned work for Lynyrd Skynyrd. It is sponsored by the International Documentary Association.

== Personal life ==
Skates cites writers/actors John Cleese, Jerry Seinfeld, Will Smith and Tim Allen amongst his influences. He married photographer and merchandiser Lori DeAngelis whom he had dated in 1980; she is third cousin to director Brian De Palma. They are both Christian conservatives, parents to three boys and currently reside in Texas.

== Discography ==
Artist	Title	Label	Type	Year
Overkill	Power in Black	Blood Metal Music	Cassette	1983
Overkill	Overkill	Azra / Metal Storm	EP	1984
Overkill	Feel the Fire	Megaforce	LP	1985
Overkill	Taking Over	Megaforce / Atlantic	LP / CD	1987
Overkill	!!!Fuck You!!!	Megaforce / Caroline	EP / CD	1987
Rat Skates / Bone to Bone	Some Stuff I Recorded	Independent	Cassette	1988
Eric Cook (Koch)	Ten Mile Road to Hell	Wild Turkey	Cassette	1989
Bomb Squad	Live at Suite 16	Demolition	Cassette	1991
Overkill	Fuck You and Then Some	Megaforce	Cassette / CD	1996
Overkill	Fuck You and Then Some / Feel the Fire	Megaforce	CD	2005
The Lubricunts	Sorry About Your Roof	Vector / Hottentots	Download / Rhapsody / iTunes	2007

== Filmography ==
Title	Role(s)	Label	Year
Welcome to the Dream	Director / Screenwriter	MVD Entertainment Group	2012
Born in the Basement	Actor / Executive Producer / Screenwriter	MVD Entertainment Group	2007
Get Thrashed	Actor / Associate Producer / Designer / Animator / Editor / Camera	Lightyear / Warner Bros.	2008

== Other appearances ==
Title	Performance	Work	Type	Label	Year
Metallica	Cast	Biography	Television Program	A&E Networks	2009
The Last Bastions of Rock	Cast	Fritch Clark	Documentary Film	Urban Blight Films	2009
Death Rider	Song Performance	Metal Massacre V	Compilation L.P. Record	Metal Blade	1984
Feel the Fire	Song Performance	New York Metal '84	Compilation L.P. Record	Rock City Records	1984
Songs (multiple) from Feel the Fire	Live Song/ German Concert Performance	The Metal Hammer Roadshow	VHS Video	Metal Hammer A.G.	1986
In Union We Stand	Song Performance/ Acting Synch	Headbangers Ball	Beta/ Music Video	Atlantic Recording Group/ MTV Networks	1987
Song Performances (Multiple)	Live Song/ Concert Performance	Videoscope	VHS Video	Atlantic/ WEA	1991
Song Performances (Multiple)	Live Song/ Concert Performance	Wrecking Everything/ The Batmen Return	DVD	Spitfire/ Eagle Vision USA	2002
