= Godsmack discography =

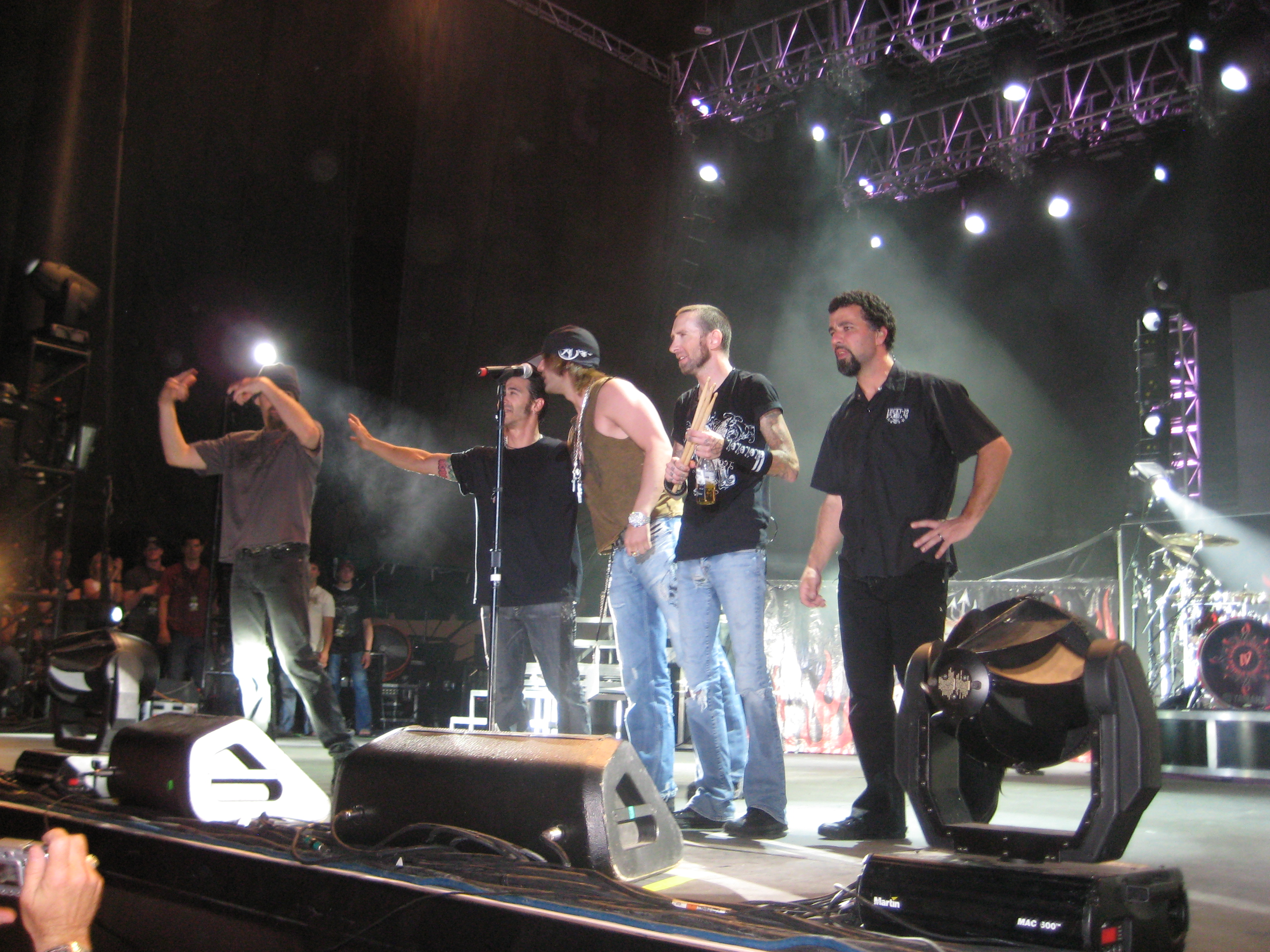
- From left to right: Robbie Merrill, Sully Erna, Criss Angel (not a band member), Shannon Larkin, Tony Rombola
- Studio albums: 9
- Extended plays: 1
- Live albums: 2
- Compilation albums: 2
- Singles: 35
- Video albums: 3
- Music videos: 23
- Guest appearances: 2
- Promotional singles: 3

Godsmack is an American rock band founded in 1995 by singer Sully Erna and bassist Robbie Merrill. The band has released nine studio albums, one EP, two live albums, two compilation albums, three video albums, twenty-three music videos, thirty-five singles, and three promotional singles. Erna and Merrill recruited local friend and guitarist Lee Richards and drummer Tommy Stewart to complete the band's lineup. In 1996, Tony Rombola replaced Richards, as the band's guitarist. In 1998, Godsmack released their self-titled debut album, a remastered version of the band's self-released debut, All Wound Up.... The album was distributed by Universal/Republic Records and shipped four million copies in the United States. In 1999, the band contributed the track "Why" to the Any Given Sunday soundtrack. After two years of touring, the band released Awake. Although the album was a commercial success, it failed to match the sales of Godsmack. In 2002, Stewart left the band due to personal differences, and was replaced by Shannon Larkin.

The band's third album, Faceless (2003), debuted at number one on the US Billboard 200. In 2004, Godsmack released an acoustic-based EP titled The Other Side. The EP debuted at number five on the Billboard 200 and was certified gold by the RIAA. The band contributed the track "Bring It On" to the Madden NFL 06 football game in 2005; this track is not featured on any known album or compilation. The band released its fourth studio album, IV, in 2006. IV was the band's second release to debut at number one, and has since been certified platinum. After touring in support of IV for over a year, Godsmack released a greatest hits album called Good Times, Bad Times... Ten Years of Godsmack. The album included every Godsmack single (with the exception of "Bad Magick"), a cover of the Led Zeppelin song "Good Times Bad Times" and a DVD of the band's acoustic performance at the House of Blues in Las Vegas, Nevada.

Their fifth studio album, The Oracle, was released on May 4, 2010. The album debuted at number one on the Billboard 200, making Godsmack one of the few bands with three consecutive albums that debuted at number one on the chart, a feat that also has been accomplished by The Rolling Stones, Van Halen, U2, Metallica, Dave Matthews Band, Staind, Disturbed, Linkin Park, Tool, and Slipknot.

== Albums ==
=== Studio albums ===
Title	Album details	Peak chart positions										Certifications
Title	Album details	US	AUS	AUT	CAN	GER	GRC	NLD	NZ	SWI	UK	Certifications
All Wound Up...	Released: February 15, 1997; Label: E.K. Records Company; Formats: CD	—	—	—	—	—	—	—	—	—	—	—
Godsmack	Released: August 25, 1998; Label: Universal, Republic; Formats: CD, CS, DI, vinyl (2024)	22	—	—	—	—	—	—	—	—	—	RIAA: 5× Platinum; MC: Gold
Awake	Released: October 31, 2000; Label: Universal, Republic; Formats: CD, CS, DI, vinyl (2024)	5	—	26	9	59	—	—	38	—	—	RIAA: 2× Platinum; MC: Platinum
Faceless	Released: April 8, 2003; Label: Universal, Republic; Formats: CD, CS, DI, vinyl (2024)	1	—	—	9	70	—	98	36	—	154	RIAA: Platinum; MC: Gold
IV	Released: April 25, 2006; Label: Universal, Republic; Formats: CD, DI	1	—	65	4	56	—	—	—	100	—	RIAA: Gold
The Oracle	Released: May 4, 2010; Label: Universal, Republic; Formats: CD, DI	1	—	—	2	72	11	—	—	—	—	RIAA: Gold
1000hp	Released: August 5, 2014; Label: Universal, Republic; Formats: CD, DI	3	65	62	2	66	—	—	—	94	—	
When Legends Rise	Released: April 27, 2018; Label: BMG; Formats: CD, DI, vinyl	8	55	12	6	21	32	153	—	28	68	RIAA: Gold
Lighting Up the Sky	Released: February 24, 2023; Label: BMG; Formats: CD, DI, vinyl	19	— (Note: "Lighting Up the Sky" did not enter the ARIA Albums chart, but peaked at number 21 on the Australian Physical Albums chart.)	5	22	10	—	—	—	17	— (Note: "Lighting Up the Sky" did not enter the UK Albums chart, but peaked at number 35 on the UK Album Sales Chart.)	
"—" denotes releases that did not chart.

=== Live albums ===
Title	Album details	Peak chart positions	
Title	Album details	US	CAN
Live & Inspired	Released: May 15, 2012; Label: Universal, Republic; Formats: CD, DI	19	23
Live at Mohegan Sun	Released: May 1, 2026; Label: Primary Wave Music; Formats: CD, DI, DVD, vinyl		

=== Compilation albums ===
Title	Album details	Peak chart positions
Title	Album details	US
Good Times, Bad Times... Ten Years of Godsmack	Released: December 4, 2007; Label: Universal, Republic; Formats: CD, DI	35
Godsmack Power Hour	Released: December 27, 2024; Label: Universal; Formats: DI	—N/a

=== Video albums ===
Title	Album details	Certifications
Live	Released: July 9, 2001; Label: Universal, Republic; Formats: DVD, UMD	RIAA: Gold
Smack This!	Released: April 9, 2002; Label: Universal, Republic; Formats: DVD	
Changes	Released: October 14, 2004; Label: Universal, Republic; Formats: DVD	RIAA: Gold; MC: Platinum

== EPs ==
The Other Side	Released: March 16, 2004; Label: Universal/Republic; Formats: CD, SACD	5	RIAA: Gold

== Singles ==
Song	Year	Peak chart positions									Certifications	Album
Song	Year	US	US Alt.	US Main. Rock	US Rock	AUS	CAN Alt.	CAN Rock	GER	NLD	Certifications	Album
"Whatever"^{[A]}	1998	116	19	7	×	—	—	—	—	—		Godsmack
"Keep Away"	1999	—	31	5	×	—	—	—	—	—		Godsmack
"Voodoo"^{[B]}	1999	102	6	5	×	—	—	—	—	—	RIAA: Platinum	Godsmack
"Bad Religion"	2000	—	32	8	×	—	—	—	—	—		Godsmack
"Awake"^{[C]}	2000	101	12	1	×	—	×	×	—	—		Awake
"Greed"^{[D]}	2000	123	28	3	×	—	×	×	—	—		Awake
"Bad Magick"	2001	—	28	12	×	—	×	×	—	—		Awake
"I Stand Alone"^{[E]}	2002	102	20	1	×	90	×	×	96	70	RIAA: Gold	The Scorpion King and Faceless
"Straight Out of Line"	2003	73	9	1	×	—	×	×	—	—		Faceless
"Serenity"^{[F]}	2003	113	10	7	×	—	×	×	—	—		Faceless
"Re-Align"	2003	—	28	3	×	—	×	×	—	—		Faceless
"Running Blind"^{[G]}	2004	123	14	3	×	—	×	×	—	—		The Other Side
"Touché"	2004	—	33	7	×	—	×	×	—	—		The Other Side
"Speak"	2006	85	10	1	×	—	×	×	—	—		IV
"Shine Down"	2006	—	31	4	×	—	×	42	—	—		IV
"The Enemy"	2006	—	—	4	×	—	×	49	—	—		IV
"Good Times Bad Times"^{[H]} (Led Zeppelin cover)	2007	124	28	8	×	—	×	46	—	—		Good Times, Bad Times... Ten Years of Godsmack
"Whiskey Hangover"^{[I]}	2009	102	20	1	7	—	23	20	—	—		The Oracle
"Cryin' Like a Bitch"	2010	74	25	1	7	—	26	16	—	—	RIAA: Gold	The Oracle
"Love-Hate-Sex-Pain"	2010	—	24	2	5	—	—	50	—	—		The Oracle
"Saints and Sinners"	2011	—	—	25	35	—	—	—	—	—		The Oracle
"Rocky Mountain Way" (Joe Walsh cover)	2012	—	—	5	17	—	—	30	—	—		Live & Inspired
"1000hp"	2014	—	—	1	22	—	—	15	—	—		1000hp
"Something Different"	2014	—	—	6	38	—	—	7	—	—		1000hp
"What's Next"	2015	—	—	11	—	—	—	—	—	—		1000hp
"Inside Yourself"	2015	—	—	32	27	—	—	—	—	—		Non-album single
"Come Together" (Beatles cover)	2012	—	—	21	11	—	—	—	—	—		Live & Inspired
"Bulletproof"	2018	—	—	1	9	—	—	10	—	—	RIAA: Platinum	When Legends Rise
"When Legends Rise"	2018	—	—	1	13	—	—	9	—	—	RIAA: Gold	When Legends Rise
"Under Your Scars"	2019	—	—	1	6	—	—	43	—	—	RIAA: Gold	When Legends Rise
"Unforgettable"	2020	—	—	1	16	—	—	31	—	—		When Legends Rise
"Surrender"	2022	—	—	1	—	—	—	18	—	—		Lighting Up the Sky
"Soul on Fire"	2023	—	—	2	—	—	—	48	—	—		Lighting Up the Sky
"Truth"	2024	—	—	1	—	—	—	—	—	—		Lighting Up the Sky
"When Legends Rise" (live at Mohegan Sun)	2026	—	—	35	—	—	—	—	—	—		Live at Mohegan Sun
"—" denotes a release that did not chart. "×" denotes periods where charts did not exist or were not archived.

== Promotional singles ==
Year	Song	Peak chart positions		Album
Year	Song	US Rock Digi.	US Hard Rock Digi.	Album
2010	"What If?"	45	—	The Oracle
2014	"Generation Day"	—	6	1000hp
2022	"You and I"	22	5	Lighting Up the Sky
"—" denotes a release that did not chart.

== Music videos ==
Year	Song	Director(s)
1998	"Whatever"	Michael Alperowitz
1999	"Keep Away"	Peter Christopherson
1999	"Voodoo"	Dean Karr
2000	"Awake"	Troy Smith
2001	"Greed"	Troy Smith and Sully Erna
2001	"Bad Magick"	Troy Smith
2002	"I Stand Alone"	The Brothers Strause
2003	"Straight Out of Line"	Dean Karr
2003	"Serenity"	Sully Erna
2006	"Speak"	Wayne Isham
2007	"Good Times Bad Times"	Rocky Schenck
2010	"Cryin' Like a Bitch"	Paul Harb
2012	"Rocky Mountain Way"	Daniel Catullo
2012	"Come Together"	Ian Barrett
2014	"1000hp"	Troy Smith
2015	"Something Different"	Paris Visone
2018	"Bulletproof"	Troy Smith
2019	"When Legends Rise"	Sully Erna and Paris Visone
2019	"Under Your Scars"	Paris Visone
2020	"Unforgettable"	Noah Berlow
2022	"Surrender"	Paris Visone
2023	"Soul On Fire"	Sully Erna
2024	"Truth"	Sully Erna and Francesca Ludikar

== Guest appearances ==
Year	Song	Album
1999	"Why"	Any Given Sunday soundtrack
1999	"Keep Away" (live)	Woodstock '99
2000	"Sweet Leaf"	Nativity in Black II
2000	"Goin' Down"	Mission: Impossible 2 soundtrack
2000	"Time Bomb" (edited)	Scream 3 soundtrack
2001	"Awake"	Tough Enough
2002	"I Stand Alone"	The Scorpion King soundtrack
2014	"Turning to Stone" (acoustic)	The Walking Dead: Songs of Survival Vol. 2
2020	"Vampires"	Hardcore Halloween

== Notes ==
- A "Whatever" did not enter the Billboard Hot 100, but peaked at number 16 on the Bubbling Under Hot 100 Singles chart, which acts as a 25-song extension to the Hot 100.
- B "Voodoo" did not enter the Billboard Hot 100, but peaked at number 2 on the Bubbling Under Hot 100 Singles chart, which acts as a 25-song extension to the Hot 100.
- C "Awake" did not enter the Billboard Hot 100, but peaked at number 3 on the Bubbling Under Hot 100 Singles chart, which acts as a 25-song extension to the Hot 100.
- D "Greed" did not enter the Billboard Hot 100, but peaked at number 23 on the Bubbling Under Hot 100 Singles chart, which acts as a 25-song extension to the Hot 100.
- E "I Stand Alone" did not enter the Billboard Hot 100, but peaked at number 3 on the Bubbling Under Hot 100 Singles chart, which acts as a 25-song extension to the Hot 100.
- F "Serenity" did not enter the Billboard Hot 100, but peaked at number 13 on the Bubbling Under Hot 100 Singles chart, which acts as a 25-song extension to the Hot 100.
- G "Running Blind" did not enter the Billboard Hot 100, but peaked at number 23 on the Bubbling Under Hot 100 Singles chart, which acts as a 25-song extension to the Hot 100.
- H "Good Times Bad Times" did not enter the Billboard Hot 100, but peaked at number 24 on the Bubbling Under Hot 100 Singles chart, which acts as a 25-song extension to the Hot 100.
- I "Whiskey Hangover" did not enter the Billboard Hot 100, but peaked at number 2 on the Bubbling Under Hot 100 Singles chart, which acts as a 25-song extension to the Hot 100.
