= Changes (Godsmack video album) =

Video by Godsmack
- Released: September 14, 2004
- Genre: Alternative metal; heavy metal; nu metal
- Label: Universal; Republic
- Director: Daniel Catullo
- Producer: Sully Erna; Daniel Catullo; Jack Gulick

Godsmack chronology
Smack This! (2002)	Changes (2004)	Good Times, Bad Times... Ten Years of Godsmack (2007)

Changes is a documentary and live DVD released in September 2004 by American rock band Godsmack. The DVD was recorded in early 2004. That same month, the group also released "Batalla de los Tambores", a drum duel between Shannon Larkin and Sully Erna, available exclusively via online services such as Apple's iTunes Music Store, Real, Napster, and the Zune Marketplace. The DVD has been certified Gold by the RIAA, with access sales of 50,000 copies in the United States.

== Filming ==
Changes offers fans the opportunity to experience the band in several ways. First is concert mode, which consists of 58 minutes of live performance footage including the hit songs "Straight Out of Line", "Voodoo", "Awake", "Moon Baby", "I Stand Alone", "Faceless," "Keep Away", "Bad Religion", "Whatever", "Re-Align", "Changes", and "Serenity".

As a feature film, which consists of 105 minutes running time, viewers experience the songs performed live directed by Daniel Catullo inter-cut with exclusive behind-the-scenes footage directed by MacNaughtan. Additionally, the DVD features super deluxe, collector's quality packaging and a choice of 5.1, DTS, 5.1 Multi-Channel or PCM Stereo/SRS Circle Surround Sound for a superior audio experience. The stereo track on "Changes" is encoded in Circle Surround 5.1, allowing anyone with a surround sound system (not just a Dolby Digital A/V receiver), to enjoy the 5.1 mix that the band and audio engineer intended.

== Track listing ==
1. "Straight Out of Line"
2. "Awake"
3. "Faceless"
4. "Bad Religion"
5. "Moon Baby"
6. "Changes"
7. "Re-Align"
8. "Serenity"
9. "Keep Away"
10. "Voodoo"
11. "Batalla de los Tambores" (instrumental)
12. "Whatever"
13. "I Stand Alone"

== "Batalla de los Tambores" ==
"Batalla de los Tambores" ("battle of the drums") is a drumming duel between Sully Erna and drummer Shannon Larkin. This battle has become a staple of the band's live show.

== Personnel ==
- Sully Erna – vocals, rhythm guitar, drums on "Batalla de los Tambores"
- Tony Rombola – lead guitar, additional vocals
- Robbie Merrill – bass, additional vocals
- Shannon Larkin – drums

== Chart positions ==
Album - Billboard (North America)

Chart (2004)	Peak position
Billboard 200	7

=== Certification ===
Region	Certification	Certified units/sales
Canada (Music Canada)	Platinum	10,000^{^}
United States (RIAA)	Gold	50,000^{^}
^{^} Shipments figures based on certification alone.
