= Live & Inspired =

Live album by Godsmack
- Released: May 15, 2012
- Recorded: Detroit Fox Theatre (Detroit, Michigan)
- Genres: Alternative metal; hard rock; nu metal
- Length: 88:56
- Label: Universal Republic
- Producers: Godsmack; Dave Fortman

Godsmack chronology
| The Oracle (2010) | Live & Inspired (2012) | 1000hp (2014) |

Singles from Live & Inspired
- 1. "Rocky Mountain Way" Released: April 24, 2012; 2. "Come Together" Released: April 4, 2017

Professional ratings
Review scores
| Source | Rating |
|---|---|
| About.com | 4/5 stars |
| Allmusic | 3/5 stars |
| Loudwire | 4/5 stars |

Live & Inspired is the first live album by American rock band Godsmack, released on May 15, 2012 by Universal Republic. The album features live renditions of songs from the band's first five studio albums and includes a bonus disc of four cover songs.

Disc 1 of the album contains 13 tracks recorded during the band's performance at the Detroit Fox Theatre in 2007, with the band's lead singer, Sully Erna, stating that the venue has a "special kind of fan base". Although released two years after their then-latest studio album, The Oracle, the tracks were performed prior to the release of that album, thus none of its tracks show up on the set list.

Disc 2 contains various covers of other rock artists.

== Track listing ==
CD 1 (Live)
| No. | Title | Writer(s) | Length |
|---|---|---|---|
| 1. | "Straight Out of Line" | Sully Erna | 5:37 |
| 2. | "Re-Align" | Erna | 4:42 |
| 3. | "Awake" | Erna | 4:57 |
| 4. | "Moon Baby" | Erna | 4:52 |
| 5. | "Changes" | Erna; Tony Rombola | 6:02 |
| 6. | "The Enemy" | Erna | 4:15 |
| 7. | "Keep Away" | Erna | 9:50 |
| 8. | "Speak" | Erna; Rombola | 3:50 |
| 9. | "Voodoo" | Merill; Erna | 4:27 |
| 10. | "Batalla de los Tambores" (instrumental) | Erna; Larkin | 6:31 |
| 11. | "Whatever" (features segments of "Detroit Rock City" and "Over the Mountain") | Rombola; Erna | 5:50 |
| 12. | "Serenity" | Erna; Rombola | 4:41 |
| 13. | "I Stand Alone" | Erna | 4:57 |
| Total length: | | | 70:31 |

CD 2 (Inspired)
| No. | Title | Writer(s) | Length |
|---|---|---|---|
| 1. | "Rocky Mountain Way" (Joe Walsh cover) | Roche Steven Grace; Kenny Passarelli; Joey Vitale; Joseph Fidler Walsh | 4:01 |
| 2. | "Come Together" (The Beatles cover) | John Lennon; Paul McCartney | 3:46 |
| 3. | "Time" (Pink Floyd cover) | David Gilmour; Nicholas Mason; Roger Waters; Rick Wright | 4:12 |
| 4. | "Nothing Else Matters" (Metallica cover) | James Alan Hetfield; Lars Ulrich | 6:26 |
| Total length: | | | 18:25 |

== Personnel ==
Godsmack

- Sully Erna – rhythm guitar, vocals, drums, percussion, talk box on "Rocky Mountain Way"
- Tony Rombola – lead guitar, backing vocals
- Robbie Merrill – bass guitar, backing vocals
- Shannon Larkin – drums, percussion, backing vocals

Additional musicians

- Chris DeCato – piano and keyboards on "Time" and "Nothing Else Matters", piano arrangement for "Nothing Else Matters"

Technical personnel

- Godsmack – producer, engineer (disc 1)
- Dave Fortman – producer (disc 2), engineer (disc 2), mixing
- Ryan Hingle – assistant engineer (disc 2)
- John Ellis – assistant engineer (disc 2)
- David Troia – assistant engineer (disc 2)
- Adam Ayan – mastering
