= Good Times, Bad Times... Ten Years of Godsmack =

Greatest hits album by Godsmack
- Released: December 4, 2007
- Genres: Alternative metal; hard rock; nu metal
- Length: 65:23
- Label: Universal Republic
- Producer: Sully Erna

Godsmack chronology
IV (2006)	Good Times, Bad Times... Ten Years of Godsmack (2007)	The Oracle (2010)

Professional ratings
Review scores
Source	Rating
AllMusic	3.5/5 stars

Good Times, Bad Times... Ten Years of Godsmack is a greatest hits collection by American rock band Godsmack. The collection includes all of Godsmack's singles, with the exception of "Bad Magick", and a DVD of the band's acoustic performance in Las Vegas at the House of Blues.

== Commercial performance ==
Good Times, Bad Times...Ten Years of Godsmack debuted at number 35 on the Billboard 200, selling around 40,000 copies in the first week of release.

== Track listing ==
All tracks are written by Sully Erna, unless noted otherwise.

No.	Title	Writer(s)	Original album	Length
1.	"Good Times Bad Times" (Led Zeppelin cover)	Jimmy Page; John Paul Jones; John Bonham	Previously unreleased	2:58
2.	"Whatever"	Sully Erna; Tony Rombola	Godsmack (1998)	3:28
3.	"Keep Away"		Godsmack	4:50
4.	"Voodoo"	Sully Erna; Robbie Merrill	Godsmack	4:40
5.	"Bad Religion"	Sully Erna; Tommy Stewart	Godsmack	3:14
6.	"Awake"		Awake (2000)	5:05
7.	"Greed"		Awake	3:28
8.	"I Stand Alone"		Faceless (2003)	4:04
9.	"Straight Out of Line"		Faceless	4:22
10.	"Serenity"		Faceless	4:35
11.	"Re-Align"		Faceless	4:20
12.	"Running Blind"		The Other Side (2004)	3:55
13.	"Touché"	Sully Erna; John Kosco; Lee Richards	The Other Side	3:38
14.	"Speak"	Sully Erna; Tony Rombola	IV (2006)	3:55
15.	"Shine Down"		IV	4:53
16.	"The Enemy"		IV	4:08
Total length:				65:23

=== An Evening with Godsmack DVD track listing ===
1. "Trippin'"
2. "Re-Align"
3. "Running Blind"
4. "Questions" (fan questions part one)
5. "Serenity"
6. "Voodoo"
7. "Questions" (fan questions part two)
8. "Spiral"
9. "Batalla de los Tambores" (bass and drum solos)
10. "Keep Away"

Encore:

1. "Touché" (feat. John Kosco and Lee Richards)
2. "Reefer Headed Woman" (feat. John Kosco and Lee Richards)

== Personnel ==
- Sully Erna – vocals, guitar, drums (tracks 2–5)
- Tony Rombola – guitar, backing vocals
- Robbie Merrill – bass, backing vocals
- Tommy Stewart – drums (tracks 6–8)
- Shannon Larkin – drums (tracks 1, 9–16)

DVD credits

- Additional vocals: John Kosco
- Rhythm guitar: Lee Richards
- Directed by: Daniel Catullo
- Produced by: Jack Gulick and Daniel Catullo
- Mixed by: Andy Johns

== Charts ==
=== Weekly charts ===
Weekly chart performance for Good Times, Bad Times... Ten Years of Godsmack
Chart (2007)	Peak position
US Billboard 200	35
US Top Alternative Albums (Billboard)	3
US Top Hard Rock Albums (Billboard)	3
US Top Rock Albums (Billboard)	6

=== Year-end charts ===
Year-end chart performance for Good Times, Bad Times... Ten Years of Godsmack
Chart (2008)	Position
US Billboard 200	171
US Top Rock Albums (Billboard)	23
