= Releasing the Demons =

Song by Godsmack

from the album Faceless
- Released: April 8, 2003
- Recorded: 2002
- Studio: Hit Factory Criteria (Miami)
- Genre: Alternative metal; heavy metal
- Length: 4:13
- Label: Republic/Universal
- Songwriter: Sully Erna
- Producers: David Bottrill; Sully Erna

"Releasing the Demons" is a song by American rock band Godsmack from their third studio album, Faceless. It was written by frontman Sully Erna. Sully borrowed the almost-whispered opening lyric "What do you see in the dark, when the demons come for you?" from the 1993 Clint Eastwood movie, In the Line of Fire.

== Song meaning ==
Godsmack lead singer Sully Erna is a Wiccan, and in the Wiccan religion, there is a threefold rule: Whatever you send out, whether it be good or bad, comes back to you three times. In this song, Erna had released demons from his body resulting in more demons returning. In the middle of the song, Erna speaks with laughter of the demons coming back to him threefold.

== Other uses ==
The riff of this song is frequently used by radio talk show host Michael Smerconish as bumper music at the end of on-air segments.

== Personnel ==
- Sully Erna – rhythm guitar, lead vocals
- Tony Rombola – lead guitar
- Robbie Merrill – bass
- Shannon Larkin – drums
