= 2023 in rock music =

This article summarizes the events related to rock music for the year of 2023.

== Notable events ==
=== January ===
- In a run that starts in December 2022, Metallica's song "Lux Aeterna" tops the Billboard Mainstream Rock chart, and stays atop of the chart for 11 weeks straight.
- Swedish rock band Katatonia releases their twelfth studio album, Sky Void of Stars. It debuts in the top 5 of three separate national album charts, in Germany, Finland, and Switzerland.
- Previously labeled as a country music artist, singer Hardy releases his second studio, The Mockingbird & the Crow, an album described as a mix of hard rock and country. The album debuts at number 4 on the US all-format Billboard 200 top albums chart, moving 34,000 album equivalent units. It is his first album to hit the top ten of the chart, and the highest debut for rock album since the Red Hot Chili Peppers in October 2022.

=== February ===
- Paramore release their sixth studio album, This Is Why. Frontwoman Hayley Williams notes the album is more guitar-driven than their prior 2017 album, After Laughter. The album debuts at number 2 on the Billboard 200 albums chart, moving 64,000 album equivalent units. The album is the band's highest chart placement in a decade.
- Linkin Park release a previously unreleased song, "Lost", which was recorded over 20 years prior during the band's Meteora (2003) sessions. The song features vocals from Chester Bennington, who died in 2017, leaving the band relatively inactive since. The song found unexpected success on the charts, debuting at number 1 on the Billboard Rock & Alternative Airplay chart, and crossing over onto the US all-format Hot 100 chart at number 38. This makes it just the fourth time that a song topped the Rock & Alternative chart on its debut, and is their first top 40 single since 2012. It is also their first song since 2014 to top the Billboard Mainstream Rock Airplay chart.
- Godsmack releases their sixth studio album, Lighting Up the Sky. The album was finished by mid-2022, but the band chose to focus on wrapping up touring for the rest of the year. Frontman Sully Erna states it may be the band's last album. The album tops the Billboard Hard Rock Albums chart, but debuts far lower on the all-format Billboard 200 chart at number 19, making it their first album in 25 years to debut outside of the top 10.

=== March ===
- Fall Out Boy releases their eighth studio album, So Much (for) Stardust, their first album in five years. The album also marked a return to a more guitar-driven pop punk sound that the band had in the 2000s. The album debuted at number 6 on the Billboard 200, moving 64,000 album equivalent units, breaking the band's three album streak of topping the chart.
- Meet Me at the Altar releases their debut studio album, Past // Present // Future. The band's success with music streaming figures of their initial singles and EPs garnered enough interest to be signed by the Fueled by Ramen record label (Fall Out Boy, Panic! at the Disco), and the album is described as sounding like early 2000s pop punk.
- Japanese metal band Babymetal releases their fourth studio album, The Other One. It is the third best-selling album of the week in Japan upon its release.
- Indie supergroup Boygenius - featuring Julien Baker, Phoebe Bridgers, and Lucy Dacus - release their debut studio album, The Record. The album tops the UK, Scottish, Irish, and Dutch national albums charts. In the US, it debuts at number 4, moving 67,000 album equivalent units.

=== April ===
- Linkin Park releases the 20th anniversary edition of their second studio album, Meteora. It contains 80 unreleased, alternate, and live takes of songs. It increases sales of the album by 635%, peaking at number 8 on the Billboard 200 chart.
- Metallica releases their eleventh studio album, 72 Seasons. The title is an allusion to the first 18 years of one's life, with the band stating that the album is themed around the ideas developed in one's youth. It is their first album to release in seven years. It debuts at number 2 on the Billboard 200, moving 146,000 album equivalent units in the first week. It is the highest selling debut for a rock album since Tool's Fear Inoculum debuted with 270,000 in 2019.
- British rock band Enter Shikari releases their seventh studio album, A Kiss for the Whole World. It tops the UK all-format albums chart, their first release to do so.

=== May ===
- Swedish band Ghost release an EP of cover songs titled Phantomime. The release debuted at number 7 on the Billboard 200 chart, moving 36,000 album equivalent units, a rare feat for such a release. It is the band's fourth release to hit the top ten of the chart.
- The Smashing Pumpkins release the final part of their triple album Atum: A Rock Opera in Three Acts, a sequel concept album exploring concepts started in the band's prior concept albums Mellon Collie and the Infinite Sadness (1996) and Machina/The Machines of God. The release has an uncommon release format, entailing three separate 11 song releases, culminating in a boxset release that contains all 33 songs and an additional 10 exclusive songs. Atum: Act One released in November 2022, Atum: Act Two in January 2023, and Atum: Act Three in May 2023. The album debuts at number 111 on the Billboard 200 chart, the band's lowest debut since their first album, Gish in 1991.
- English indie rock band Lovejoy releases their third EP, Wake Up & It's Over. It debuts at number 5 on the UK albums chart, a career best for the band.
- Dave Matthews Band release their tenth studio album, and first in five years, Walk Around the Moon. It debuts at number 5 on the Billboard 200 chart, moving 44,000 album equivalent units. Of the number, 40,000 are of album sales, making it the top selling album of the week. It is also the band's fourteenth album to debut in the top 100 of the Billboard 200, and makes the band one of just 11 artists who have had a top 10 album in four separate decades.
- Matchbox Twenty releases their fifth studio album, Where the Light Goes. It is their first new studio album in eleven years. It debuts at number 2 on the Australian national albums chart.

=== June ===
- Foo Fighters release their eleventh studio album, But Here We Are. It is the band's first since There Is Nothing Left to Lose (1999) to be recorded without long-time drummer Taylor Hawkins, who died unexpectedly in March 2022. The album explore the bands feelings on processing his death. Dave Grohl performs drums in his place on the album, while Josh Freese joins the band moving forward. The album tops the Billboard Top Alternative Albums and Top Hard Rock Albums charts, and debuts at number six on the all-format Billboard 200 chart, moving 62,000 equivalent album units. Concurrently, the album's lead single, "Rescued", tops the Hot Hard Rock Songs chart.
- Avenged Sevenfold releases their eighth studio album, and first in seven years, Life Is But a Dream.... Progress with the album has been repeatedly slowed down and delayed due to the band's desire to record some parts of the album with a 78 piece orchestra conflicting with the COVID-19 pandemic and its various restrictions. The release is popular among critics, but more divisive among the band's fanbase. It debuts with 36,000 album equivalent units moved in its opening week, roughly half of their prior album, The Stage (2016).
- Queens of the Stone Age release their eighth studio album, In Times New Roman.... It was their first studio album in six years. The album debuts at number 9, moving 36,000 album equivalent units. It also debuts at number 2 on the UK albums chart.

=== July ===
- Blur releases their ninth studio album, and first in eight years, The Ballad of Darren. It debuts at number one on the UK chart, their seventh studio album to do so. It tops multiple other national charts as well.
- Greta Van Fleet released their third studio album, Starcatcher. It debuts at number 8 on the Billboard 200 albums chart, moving 45,000 album equivalent units. All three of the bands studio albums debuted in the top 10 of the chart.
- Long-running punk band Anti-Flag breaks up after 35 years, without warning, mid-European tour, originally without explanation. It's later revealed it was done in response to a podcast that accused frontman Justin Sane of sexual assault. The report inspires 12 other women to come forward to Rolling Stone magazine, which publishes an expose of other allegations of sexual assault and statutory rape by Sane. The remaining three band members condemn his actions and blame him for tarnishing the band's legacy, which had included supporting feminism and supporting women in music.

=== August ===
- Mammoth WVH, the band of Eddie Van Halen's son Wolfgang Van Halen, releases their second studio album, Mammoth II. Work on the album began in September 2022, and had a faster recording time than the original album, Mammoth WVH now that Wolfgang had already established the band's vision and sound. The album debuts as the top selling independently released album of the week, and fourth best-selling overall in the US.
- The Killers's frontman Brandon Flowers announced that he cancelled the band's eighth studio album that had announced for 2023 release the year prior. Flowers admitted that the band was going through a bit of an identity crisis; the album they had been working on would have been an attempt to revisit the synth-driven sound and success of their breakout album Hot Fuss, but halfway through, he came to the conclusion that he could not write such an album. He noted he prefers the sound he pursued in their 2021 release Pressure Machine, but that it did not match what the fanbase expected out of the band. No plan for the future was disclosed.
- Zach Bryan releases his fourth studio album, Zach Bryan. Billboard classifies the album as a blend of rock, Americana, and country music. The album tops the Billboard 200 chart for 2 straight weeks, opening with 200,000 album equivalent units and moving another 110,000 copies in its second week. It is the first rock album to top the chart in 2023, and the highest debut in 4 years since Tool's Fear Innoculum opening with 270,000 units in 2019.

=== September ===
- The death of Jimmy Buffett on September 1 spurs an increase in his back catalogue of music. His biggest song, "Margaritaville", (1977) re-enters the Billboard all-format Hot 100 at number 38, giving him his first Top 40 song in over a decade. Additionally, Songs You Know by Heart rises to number 4 on the Billboard 200 albums chart, moving 52,000 album equivalent units, and topped the Top Album Sales with 15,000 copies sold.
- Staind releases their eighth studio album, their first new album in 12 years, Confessions of the Fallen. Frontman Aaron Lewis, who spent much of the 2010s on a solo country music career, described it as a return to the band's "heavier" sound. The album tops the Billboard Top Rock Albums and Top Hard Rock Albums charts, but only hits 64 on the all-format Billboard 200 chart, their lowest since Dysfunction (1999).
- British musician Steven Wilson (of the band Porcupine Tree) released his seventh studio album, The Harmony Codex. Like much of his work, it is a concept album. It debuted and peaked at number 4 on the UK albums chart.

=== October ===
- Blink-182 released their ninth studio album, One More Time.... It tops the Billboard 200 chart, making them the first rock band to top the chart in 2023, moving 125,000 album equivalent units. The album also debuts in the top 3 of over 10 national albums charts, while its title track also found crossover success too, peaking at number 62 on the US Hot 100 singles chart. The album went through a variety of changes and obstacles over the course of 4 years leading up to its release. New material originally started as bonus material for a deluxe release of their prior album, Nine (2019), but was later separated out as a separate release due to its differing sound and content. Initially scheduled release across 2020 and 2021, progress slowed due to the COVID-19 pandemic, Mark Hoppus's cancer diagnosis, and drummer Travis Barker recording and touring two pop punk albums with Machine Gun Kelly. Hoppus's cancer diagnosis restarted communication with original guitarist Tom DeLonge, who rejoined the band in October 2022, replacing Matt Skiba, who had been with the band since 2015.
- The Rolling Stones released their 26th studio album, Hackney Diamonds. It is their first studio album of original material in 18 years. It debuts atop in over 15 national albums charts including Australia and the UK. However, Blink-182's One More Time... and Drake's For All the Dogs prevent it from topping the US Billboard 200 chart, with it debuting at number 3 on the chart, moving 101,000 album equivalent units. The performance made them become the only musical act to have a top 10-charting album across seven decades since the 1960s.

=== November ===
- The Beatles release their final song, "Now and Then". It topped the UK Singles chart, peaked at number 7 on the Billboard all-format Hot 100 chart, and charted on countless national singles charts.
- Jimmy Buffett releases his 32nd and final album recorded prior to his death, Equal Strain on All Parts. It debuted at number 5 on the Billboard 200 chart, moving 53,000 album equivalent units in its opening week.
- Dolly Parton, primarily a country musician, releases her first rock album in her 60-year career, Rockstar. The decision to record a rock album was spurred after Parton's induction into the Rock and Roll Hall of Fame in 2022; Parton believed that she should release at least one rock album as part of the achievement. It debuted at number 3 on the Billboard 200 chart and sells 118,500 copies in its opening week - her biggest sales total since the beginning of the modern sales tracking in 1991.

=== December ===
- Green Day's single "The American Dream Is Killing Me" topped the Billboard Mainstream Rock chart for the entire month of December, and then beyond it, for a consecutive 8 weeks.
- Jordan Fish announces he is amicably leaving Bring Me the Horizon after 11 years with the band. He is often credited for the band's transition into mainstream popularity since the mid-2010s.

=== Year end ===
- Linkin Park's Lost" is the number one Billboard Mainstream Rock song of the year.

== Tours ==
- The surviving members of Pantera are on tour in 2023, their first tour in over 20 years. In place of the deceased Dimebag Darrell and Vinnie Paul will be guitarist Zakk Wylde and drummer Charlie Benante.
- Britpop band Pulp is scheduled to tour for the first time in over a decade.
- Blink-182 postpone the first leg of their 2023 world tour after drummer Travis Barker injures a finger. The March and April dates in Mexico and Latin America are postponed to 2024, while the North American leg starts up as planned in May.
- Aerosmith announces their farewell tour titled "Peace Out: The Farewell Tour". It is set to begin in September 2023. Founding drummer Joey Kramer was announced as not taking part in the tour, as he plans to focus on his family and his health. Three dates into the tour, it was put on hold a month due to Steven Tyler hurting his vocal cords, with cancelled dates delayed rescheduled into 2024.

== Deaths ==
- 10 January – Jeff Beck, 78, English guitarist and former member of The Yardbirds and The Jeff Beck Group
- 12 January
  - Robbie Bachman, 69, Canadian drummer and founding member of Bachman-Turner Overdrive
  - Lisa Marie Presley, 54, American singer and only child of Elvis Presley
- 17 January – Van Conner, 55, American bassist and founding member of Screaming Trees
- 18 January – David Crosby, 81, American guitarist and vocalist, former member of the Byrds and Crosby, Stills, Nash & Young
- 14 February – Akira Tsuneoka, 51, Japanese drummer (Hi-Standard)
- 16 February – Michael Kupper, 65, German heavy metal musician (Running Wild)
- 20 February – Lyubomyr Futorsky, 50, Ukrainian singer (Dead Rooster)
- 23 February – Junnosuke Kuroda, 34, Japanese musician
- 5 March – Gary Rossington, 71, American guitarist and founding member of Lynyrd Skynyrd
- 8 March – Josua Madsen, 45, Danish drummer, (traffic accident)
- 22 March – Wayne Swinny, 59, American guitarist and founding member of Saliva
- 23 March – Luca Bergia, 54, Italian drummer (Marlene Kuntz)
- 28 April – Tim Bachman, 71, American guitarist and founding member of Bachman-Turner Overdrive
- 13 May – Arno Veimer, 50, Estonian guitarist and lyricist (Terminaator)
- 19 May – Andy Rourke, 59, English bassist and founding member of The Smiths
- 24 May – Tina Turner, 83, Swiss-American musician and dancer
- 25 June – Tapas Das (Bapida), 68, Indian rock singer, songwriter and guitarist
- 5 July – George Tickner, 76, American guitarist and founding member of Journey
- 11 July – Toni Carbone, 62, Italian bass guitarist (heart attack)
- 26 July
  - Randy Meisner, 77, American bassist and founding member of the Eagles
  - Sinéad O'Connor, 56, Irish singer-songwriter
- 4 August – John Gosling, 75, British keyboardist and former member of the Kinks
- 5 August – Issei "Issay" Fujisaki, 61, Japanese singer and founding member of Der Zibet
- 9 August – Robbie Robertson, 80, Canadian guitarist, songwriter, and founding member of the Band
- 24 August – Bernie Marsden, 72, English guitarist and founding member of Whitesnake
- 30 August – Jack Sonni, 68, American guitarist and former member of Dire Straits
- 2 September – Jimmy Buffett, 76, American singer-songwriter
- 4 September – Steve Harwell, 56, American singer (Smash Mouth)
- 19 October – Atsushi Sakurai, 57, Japanese singer and founding member of Buck-Tick
- 29 October – Heath (Hiroshi Morie), 55, Japanese bass guitarist, singer and songwriter
- 14 December – Giorgos Tolios, 58, Greek drummer (Trypes)
- 16 December – Colin Burgess, 77, Australian rock drummer (AC/DC)

== Band breakups ==
- NOFX announced in September 2022 that the band plans to break up in 2023 after a series of farewell concerts.
- Panic! at the Disco announced in January 2023 that they plan on breaking up in 2023 after a final European tour.
- Fleetwood Mac
- Palm
- Anti-Flag
