= Live (Godsmack video) =

Godsmack Live

Video by Godsmack
- Released: July 19, 2001
- Recorded: March 2, 2001, Worcester, Massachusetts
- Genre: Alternative metal, nu metal, heavy metal
- Length: 82:00
- Label: Universal/Republic

Godsmack chronology
Godsmack Live (2001)	Smack This! (2002)

Live is the first live DVD by American rock band Godsmack. Released in 2001, the DVD has been certified Gold by the RIAA, with access sales of 50,000 copies in the United States. It was filmed at Centrum in Worcester, in Worcester, Massachusetts on March 2, 2001.

== Track listing ==
1. "Opening"
2. "Awake"
3. "Sick of Life"
4. "Vampires"
5. "Bad Magick"
6. "Bad Religion"
7. "Mistakes"
8. "Greed"
9. "Trippin'"
10. "Get Up, Get Out!"
11. "Spiral"
12. "Keep Away"
13. "Voodoo"
14. "Whatever"

== Personnel ==
- Sully Erna – vocals, rhythm guitar, additional drums
- Tony Rombola – lead guitar, additional vocals
- Robbie Merrill – bass, additional vocals
- Tommy Stewart – drums
