= Smack This! =

Video by Godsmack
- Released: April 4, 2002
- Genre: Alternative metal, nu metal, groove metal
- Length: 75:00
- Label: Universal/Republic
- Director: Ian Barrett

Godsmack chronology
Live (2001)	Smack This! (2002)	Changes (2004)

Smack This! is the second video by American rock band Godsmack, released in April 2002. It was filmed over a period of five years, during which Godsmack released two albums and went on ten different live tours. The film is a compilation of candid interviews, backstage antics, and live footage from the band's tours.

== Song track listing ==
1. "Whatever"
2. "Immune"
3. "Voodoo"
4. "Get Up, Get Out!"
5. "Time Bomb"
6. "Walk" (with Pantera)
7. "Keep Away"
8. "Stress"
9. "Moon Baby"

== Personnel ==
- Sully Erna – vocals, rhythm guitar, additional drums
- Tony Rombola – lead guitar, additional vocals
- Robbie Merrill – bass, additional vocals
- Tommy Stewart – drums
