= Truth (Godsmack song) =

2024 song by Godsmack

Single by Godsmack

from the album Lighting Up the Sky
- Released: February 13, 2024
- Genre: Rock ballad
- Length: 4:33
- Label: BMG
- Songwriter: Sully Erna
- Producers: Erna; Andrew Murdock

Godsmack singles chronology
"Soul on Fire" (2023)	"Truth" (2024)	"When Legends Rise (Live at Mohegan Sun)" (2026)

Music video
- "Truth" on YouTube

"Truth" is a song by American rock band Godsmack. It was released as the fourth single from their ninth studio album, Lighting Up the Sky. It reached number one on the Billboard Mainstream Rock Airplay chart in June 2024.

== Background ==
Frontman Sully Erna said "Truth" was inspired by the betrayal he experienced during a seven-year relationship while Godsmack were recording Lighting Up the Sky. Erna said the experience forced him to pause work on the album for about six or seven months, during which he returned to New Hampshire to process the experience. He recalled writing the song during his time away from the band, describing it as raw, emotional and vulnerable. He said he had to capture the idea when it came to him because it would otherwise disappear quickly. Erna added that after completing and recording the song, the band decided to include it on the album, with Erna describing it as "a really big, beautiful rock ballad". Discussing the song, Erna said he believed sharing personal stories and vulnerabilities could help people heal and move forward, adding that it was how he chose to create his art. In the video Behind the Scenes of the Making of "Truth", Erna said he decided to publicly discuss the personal events behind the song because he believed people should openly share their emotional and physical scars.

== Composition ==
"Truth" has been described as a "strings-swathed ballad", an introspective ballad, and a piano ballad.

== Music video ==
An official music video for "Truth", co-directed by Sully Erna and Francesca Ludikar, was released on February 29, 2024. A behind-the-scenes video about the single was released on YouTube on April 3, 2024. It includes footage of Erna discussing how he was feeling and becoming too emotional to perform the song in the studio.

== Chart performance ==
"Truth" reached number one on the Billboard Mainstream Rock Airplay chart dated June 1, 2024, becoming Godsmack's 13th chart-topper and tying the band with Van Halen for the sixth-most number-one songs on the chart.

== Personnel ==
Credits adapted from Apple Music.

Godsmack

- Sully Erna – vocals, acoustic guitar, drums, keyboards, rhythm guitar
- Robbie Merrill – double bass
- Tony Rombola – lead guitar

Production and engineering

- Mudrock – producer, recording engineer
- Dave Fortman – recording engineer
- Ted Jensen – recording engineer
- Pat Rowe – recording engineer
- Ai Fujisaki – recording engineer
- Chad Zuchegno – recording engineer

== Charts ==
=== Weekly charts ===
Weekly chart performance for "Truth"
Chart (2024)	Peak position
US Rock & Alternative Airplay (Billboard)	6
US Mainstream Rock Airplay (Billboard)	1

=== Year-end charts ===
Year-end chart performance for "Truth"
Chart (2024)	Position
US Rock & Alternative Airplay (Billboard)	30
US Mainstream Rock Airplay (Billboard)	14
