= Vampires (Godsmack song) =

Song by Godsmack

from the album Awake
- Released: October 31, 2000
- Studio: River's Edge Productions Inc., Haverhill, Massachusetts
- Genre: Heavy metal; spoken word
- Length: 3:48
- Label: Republic/Universal
- Songwriter(s): Sully Erna; Robbie Merrill
- Producer(s): Sully Erna; Andrew Murdock

"Vampires" is a song by American rock band Godsmack. It appeared as the ninth track on the band's second studio album, Awake, in 2000. "Vampires" is a spoken word song with some dialogue from a television show named Mysterious Forces Beyond. The song received a Grammy nomination for "Best Rock Instrumental" in 2001.

In 2002, lead singer Sully Erna reflected on the song's Grammy nomination:

"I don't even know why we were nominated, because we were in a category with Joe Satriani and these other guys for best instrumental performance. And the instrumental that we had on our record was an accident, so that was pretty bizarre to be nominated for that."

The song is written by Sully Erna and Robbie Merrill.

== Personnel ==
- Sully Erna – guitar
- Tony Rombola – guitar
- Robbie Merrill – bass
- Tommy Stewart – drums
