= Cerbone =

Cerbone may refer to:

- Cerbonius (died 575), bishop known in Italian as Cerbone
- Jason Cerbone (born 1977), American actor
- Ray Cerbone, former member of The Apocalypse Blues Revival, an American rock band
