= Inside Yourself =

Single by Godsmack
- Released: October 14, 2015
- Genre: Hard rock, alternative metal
- Length: 4:04
- Songwriter: Sully Erna

Godsmack singles chronology
"What's Next" (2015)	"Inside Yourself" (2015)	"Come Together" (2017)

"Inside Yourself" is a song by American rock band Godsmack. It was released as a single for free download in October 2015.

== Charts ==
Chart (2015)	Peak position
US Hot Rock & Alternative Songs (Billboard)	27
US Mainstream Rock (Billboard)	32
