= Running Blind (song) =

Single by Godsmack

from the album The Other Side
- Released: February 29, 2004
- Recorded: 2003
- Genre: Acoustic rock
- Length: 4:00
- Label: Republic/Universal
- Songwriter: Sully Erna
- Producer: Sully Erna

Godsmack singles chronology
"Re-Align" (2004)	"Running Blind" (2004)	"Touché" (2004)

"Running Blind" is a song by American rock band Godsmack. Written and produced by frontman Sully Erna, it was the first single from the band's acoustic EP The Other Side.

== Writing ==
During a Godsmack's acoustic live show in London in 2012, frontman Erna, before playing the song, explained:

"This song has actually become one of my favorite Godsmack songs over the years. It was actually a song that was written back during touring of the second album Awake and it was a period of this band’s life, where the band was going through some dark times, we’ve been touring for about three and a half years at that point, and we hadn’t seen our homes, families and friends, and when you are on the road that long, you are just grinding away, you’re just programmed like a robot and you had some alcohol and drugs, and all of a sudden the band starts arguing with hangovers and that kind of stuff and it leads you in some dark places and the band was very disconnected at that point, not career. I remember I was sitting in my dress room quite bit by myself with an acoustic guitar and I was just writing songs and some of them came out a little bit darker and sadder, but it also helped me vent a lot of the emotions and the frustrations that I was feeling at that moment, so Running Blind is the song that was written during that time."

== Live performance ==
Godsmack debuted the song at The Tonight Show with Jay Leno on March 5, 2004.

== Charts ==
=== Weekly charts ===
Weekly chart performance for "Running Blind"
Chart (2004)	Peak position
US Bubbling Under Hot 100 (Billboard)	23
US Alternative Airplay (Billboard)	14
US Mainstream Rock (Billboard)	3

=== Year-end charts ===
Year-end chart performance for "Running Blind"
Chart (2004)	Position
US Mainstream Rock Tracks (Billboard)	22
US Modern Rock Tracks (Billboard)	64

== Personnel ==
- Sully Erna – acoustic guitar, lead vocals, producer
- Tony Rombola – acoustic guitar, additional vocals
- Robbie Merrill – bass
- Shannon Larkin – drums
