= Straight Out of Line =

Single by Godsmack

from the album Faceless
- Released: March 13, 2003
- Studio: Hit Factory Criteria (Miami)
- Length: 4:19
- Label: Universal; Republic
- Songwriter: Sully Erna
- Producers: David Bottrill; Sully Erna

Godsmack singles chronology
"I Stand Alone" (2002)	"Straight Out of Line" (2003)	"Serenity" (2003)

Music video
- "Straight Out of Line" on YouTube

"Straight Out of Line" is a song by American rock band Godsmack and the lead single from their album Faceless. After its release in March 2003, the song immediately ascended to number one on the Mainstream Rock chart, and hit the top 10 on the Modern Rock chart. It was the band's third number one on the Mainstream Rock chart and remained at that specific position for two weeks. It is also their highest-charting single on the Billboard Hot 100, reaching No. 73.

== Music video ==
Before the release of Faceless, Godsmack filmed a performance-based video for the song in Los Angeles with director Dean Karr. "The song has got good aggression, and the visuals, when the band plays it, look really good," Erna explained to MTV.com. "Sometimes it's really hard to shove a story within a four-minute video, unless you're a solo artist like Eminem or wherever, because all you have to do is cut back to him once in a while. When there are four guys in a band and you have to try to cover all of them and get a story in, sometimes you don't quite get the story in and it becomes irrelevant."

== Grammy Awards ==
In 2004, the song had Grammy nomination for 'Best Hard Rock Performance'. However, the award went to Evanescence's single, "Bring Me to Life".

== Appearance ==
The song appeared on several compilations including the band's greatest hits album, Good Times, Bad Times...Ten Years of Godsmack, MTV2 Headbangers Ball, Total Rock Vol. 3, and Universal Smash Hits Vol. 2.

== Charts ==
Chart (2003)	Peak position
US Billboard Hot 100	73
US Mainstream Rock Tracks	1
US Modern Rock Tracks	9

== Personnel ==
- Sully Erna – vocals, rhythm guitar
- Tony Rombola – lead guitar
- Robbie Merrill – bass
- Shannon Larkin – drums

== See also ==
- List of Billboard Mainstream Rock number-one songs of the 2000s
