= The Apocalypse Blues Revival =

American rock band

- Origin: Fort Lauderdale, U.S.
- Genres: Blues rock; psychedelic rock
- Years active: 2016–2019, 2020–present
- Label: Provogue Records
- Spinoff of: Godsmack
- Members: Tony Rombola; Shannon Larkin; Brian Carpenter; Shane Hall
- Past members: Ray Cerbone

The Apocalypse Blues Revue was an American rock band formed in 2016. The band features two members of the rock group Godsmack, Shannon Larkin and Tony Rombola, alongside Brian Carpenter and Ray Cerbone. Originally formed as a blues rock band, the group expanded its sound by adding psychedelic rock to its repertoire with their third album. Larkin said the band's music was intended to "mix the influences from my two favorite classic rock artists—David Bowie and Pink Floyd—with my favorite blues artists: Johnny Winter, Stevie Ray Vaughan and B.B. King." The band's debut album reached the top 10 of Billboard's Blues Albums chart.

In 2019, the band was resurrected with a name change and member change at the front. Shane Hall (who sang for another project that Shannon and Tony were doing on the side for fun) replaced Ray "Rafer John" Cerbone on vocals. The band then changed the name to The Apocalypse Blues Revival. The new version of the band released their first song, "Can't Win for Losing", on July 22, 2019.

== History ==
Godsmack bandmates Larkin and Rombola discovered their mutual love of blues music for the first time while they were writing together back in 2010. Growing tired of metal music they played in Godsmack, they put together a side project, which later evolved into Blues Revue when they added Carpenter, who had won a talent contest, and met Cerbone in a biker bar. With the lineup solidified, the group signed a recording contract with Provogue Records.

Three months after signing to Provogue, the band released their self-titled debut LP on August 26, 2016, produced by Dave Fortman. It debuted at No. 6 on Billboard's Top Blues Album chart. Their second album, The Shape of Blues to Come, was released on July 20, 2018. The band will be touring the record in between supporting Godsmack's latest release in late 2018 and early 2019.

On February 21, 2019, it was announced the band had called it quits.
