= I Stand Alone (Godsmack song) =

Single by Godsmack

from the album The Scorpion King soundtrack and Faceless
- Released: February 1, 2002
- Genre: Alternative metal; nu metal
- Length: 4:05
- Label: Universal
- Songwriter: Sully Erna
- Producers: David Bottrill; Sully Erna

Godsmack singles chronology
"Greed" (2001)	"I Stand Alone" (2002)	"Straight Out of Line" (2003)

Music video
- "I Stand Alone" on YouTube

"I Stand Alone" is a song by the American rock band Godsmack. It was released to radio in February 1, 2002 as the lead single from the Scorpion King soundtrack. It would reappear on Godsmack's third studio album, Faceless, the following year. It won a 2002 Metal Edge Readers' Choice Award for "Song of the Year From a Movie Soundtrack."

"I Stand Alone" reached No. 1 on the Mainstream Rock chart and No. 20 on the Modern Rock chart in the US. The single achieved Gold certification for more than half a million copies shipped in the United States, spurring sales of over 1.5 million copies for Faceless and propelling Godsmack to worldwide popularity.

== Writing and production ==
"I Stand Alone" was written by Sully Erna and produced by David Bottrill for the film The Scorpion King, with the band receiving a script and a trailer, deciding to then write about the main character, Mathayus. The film's star, Dwayne Johnson, complimented the result, saying "When you see that on the trailer, "I Stand Alone", that's a hot, hot song, and very indicative of what the character's all about." Erna elaborated on how the song was created:

"I had a little bit of time before we started writing the new album. And it turned out that The Scorpion King director Chuck Russell was a fan of Godsmack and wanted to use our song "Voodoo" in the movie. Because the song was a little dated, he wanted me to redo it, and I wasn't really up for that. Instead I submitted some new music I had written 'I Stand Alone'. Once we were working together, he leaned on me a little bit to help him find some of the best up-and-coming bands."

In terms of production, Robbie Merrill stated that Mudrock managed to bring Sully to another level with his vocal range and trying different ideas that the band wouldn't have tried in the past. They wanted to give the producer a chance and it worked out well.

== Music and lyrics ==
"The song was written about the character, the Scorpion King, in the movie," Erna explained on the set of the accompanying video. "It's about him being this big, masculine badass, but he has this hidden sensitive side to him. He feels like he's isolated, and he likes to do things alone because he was hurt in the past or whatever. I don't really know why he is the way he is. I guess there's always this mystique about those people who are really tough but maybe feel a little bit lonely inside. So the lyrics are kind of based on his character — being as masculine as he can be but yet isolated and a loner."

"I Stand Alone" features a chugging main riff enhanced by textural, single-note guitar lines and powerful, melodic vocals. The song starts with a lunging beat and a guitar riff that shifts between a low, rumbling buzz and an eerie series of notes much higher up the fretboard. Then, for the verse, the song locks into a crunching, percussive riff reminiscent of Metallica before kicking back into the eerie opening passage with Sully Erna scream-singing the song's title and the lines "I'm not afraid of fading/ Feeling your sting down inside of me/ I'm not dying for it." During the midsection of the song, the music turns creepy and atmospheric, and the singer moans, "It's my time to dream/ Dream of the skies/ Make me believe that this place isn't made by the poison in me/ Help me decide if my fire will burn out before you can breathe."

== Music video ==
The music video is based on The Scorpion King, and it also features clips from the film. It was directed by the Brothers Strause. The video was made at a cost of approx $750,000.

== Grammy Awards ==
"I Stand Alone" had two Grammy nominations for 'Best Rock Song' and, 'Best Hard Rock Performance' respectively. In an interview with him, Sully Erna said that the group's two Grammy Award nominations took the band by surprise, because they didn't release an album in 2002.

"It did take us by surprise, because we've been so busy working on the new record and things like that, we didn't even think about," Erna said. "2002 was kind of a wash for us, except for that one track. It served its purpose. It kept us afloat the whole time we were down working on the new album and stuff, so...but now that it's soaking in I'm like, I'm pretty excited that we just got nominated for a couple. Whether we take it, or whether we don't, it's still...Someone recognized us for the hard work we've done."

Also, Erna admits that the band was pretty excited because they were nominated in a rock category.

"It was definitely a surprise being nominated again," Erna said. "The first year, I don't even know why we were nominated, because we were in a category with Joe Satriani and these other guys for best instrumental performance. And the instrumental that we had on our record was an accident, so that was pretty bizarre to be nominated for that. But this year we're pretty excited because we consider ourselves a rock band and we're in a rock category."

== Track listing ==
No.	Title	Writer(s)	Length
1.	"I Stand Alone"	Erna	4:05
2.	"Bad Religion"	Erna; Stewart	3:14
3.	"Sick of Life"	Erna	3:53
4.	"Vampires"	Erna	3:48

Though it appeared on Faceless, "I Stand Alone" was released a year early in conjunction with The Scorpion King, and only later added to Faceless. Therefore, the tracks on the single are all off their previous releases, Godsmack and Awake.

== Charts ==
=== Weekly charts ===
Chart (2002)	Peak position
Australia (ARIA)	90
Germany (GfK)	96
Netherlands (Single Top 100)	70
US Bubbling Under Hot 100 (Billboard)	2
US Alternative Airplay (Billboard)	20
US Mainstream Rock (Billboard)	1

== Certifications ==
Region	Certification	Certified units/sales
New Zealand (RMNZ)	Platinum	30,000^{‡}
United States (RIAA)	Gold	500,000^{^}
^{^} Shipments figures based on certification alone.^{‡} Sales+streaming figures based on certification alone.

== See also ==
- The Scorpion King soundtrack
