= Serenity (song) =

Single by Godsmack

from the album Faceless
- Released: June 24, 2003
- Length: 4:34
- Label: Republic/Universal
- Songwriters: Sully Erna; Tony Rombola
- Producers: David Bottrill; Sully Erna

Godsmack singles chronology
"Straight Out of Line" (2003)	"Serenity" (2003)	"Re-Align" (2004)

Music video
- "Serenity" on YouTube

"Serenity" is a single by the rock band Godsmack from the 2003 album Faceless. It reached number seven on the Mainstream Rock chart and number ten on the Modern Rock chart.

== Song origin ==
The song "Serenity" was written by Godsmack frontman Sully Erna in tribute to one of his childhood heroes, Rush drummer Neil Peart. He wrote the song after reading the book Ghost Rider: Travels on the Healing Road, penned by Peart about his motorcycle trip along the Pan-American Highway that he took to cope with the deaths of his daughter Selena Taylor and wife Jacqueline Taylor one year apart from another.

"The book is so amazing," Erna told MTV.com. "He jumped on his motorcycle and within 14 months, drove 55,000 miles across the world. His experience about healing himself on the road inspired me to write this dark, tribal song," Erna says.

Originally, Erna had hoped Peart would play on the track so he sent the drummer a demo version of the song along with his request. Peart sent a note back saying he was unable to appear on the record because of touring commitments, but he gave Godsmack his blessings and complimented the group on its song.

== Critical reception ==
Bram Teitelman of Billboard was surprised by the unplugged approach the band took with the song, praising the use of congas and acoustic guitars to put together a "trancelike" sound for the listeners and the "wider vocal range" that Sully Erna displays more than usual, concluding that "it serves as a good balance record at modern and album rock, and it won't disappoint the band's platinum-plus fan base."

== Music video ==
A music video was released for this song, showing the band performing during their appearance on Pepsi Smash in 2003.

== Track listing ==
No.	Title	Writer(s)	Length
1.	"Serenity"	Erna; Rombola	4:34
2.	"Re-Align"	Erna	4:20
3.	"Time Bomb"	Erna	3:59
4.	"Serenity" (Edited Version)	Erna; Rombola	4:34

== Chart positions ==
Singles U.S. Billboard

Year	Chart	Position
2003	Mainstream Rock Tracks	7
2004	Modern Rock Tracks	10
2004	Bubbling Under Hot 100 Singles	13
