= Re-Align =

Single by Godsmack

from the album Faceless
- Released: March 16, 2004
- Studio: Hit Factory Criteria (Miami)
- Genre: Alternative metal
- Length: 4:21 (album version)
- Label: Universal
- Songwriter: Sully Erna
- Producers: David Bottrill; Sully Erna

Godsmack singles chronology
"Serenity" (2003)	"Re-Align" (2004)	"Running Blind" (2004)

"Re-Align" is a single by the rock band Godsmack. It reached number three on the Mainstream Rock chart and number twenty eight on the Modern Rock chart in the United States. The single was released in its album form, but was also used to promote upcoming-at-the-time acoustic EP The Other Side.

== Song meaning ==
According to Sully Erna, the song is about how every time he tours to New Orleans with Godsmack, he gets sick. Erna attributes this to having been killed in New Orleans in a previous life and being haunted by "evil spirits" every time he visits New Orleans.

== Versions ==
There are two versions of "Re-Align". The original version appeared on Godsmack's third studio album, Faceless. The second version, which is an acoustic recording, appeared on The Other Side EP.

== Charts ==
=== Weekly charts ===
Weekly chart performance for "Re-Align"
Chart (2004)	Peak position
US Alternative Airplay (Billboard)	28
US Mainstream Rock Airplay (Billboard)	3

=== Year-end charts ===
Year-end chart performance for "Re-Align"
Chart (2004)	Position
US Mainstream Rock Tracks (Billboard)	16
US Modern Rock Tracks (Billboard)	85
