= Faceless (Godsmack album) =

Studio album by Godsmack
- Released: April 8, 2003
- Recorded: 2001–2002
- Studio: Hit Factory Criteria (Miami, Florida)
- Genres: Alternative metal; hard rock; nu metal
- Length: 47:19
- Labels: Universal; Republic
- Producers: Sully Erna; David Bottrill

Godsmack chronology
Awake (2000)	Faceless (2003)	The Other Side (2004)

Singles from Faceless
- 1. "I Stand Alone" Released: May 18, 2002; 2. "Straight Out of Line" Released: March 13, 2003; 3. "Serenity" Released: June 24, 2003; 4. "Re-Align" Released: March 16, 2004

Faceless is the fourth studio album by American rock band Godsmack. It is the first album to feature drummer Shannon Larkin. The album was released on April 8, 2003.

The songs "I Stand Alone" and "Straight Out of Line" had Grammy nominations for 'Best Rock Song' and 'Best Hard Rock Performance' respectively.

== Recording and lyrical themes ==
The writing and recording process, according to Erna, was a self-contained one in which the band holed up in a rented home in Miami, Florida and wrote without distraction or influence from the rock music scene going on around them.

On the subject of the album, Erna told LAUNCH Media: "It's a bit more musical at times, it's a bit more melodic, but it's still raw," Erna said. "It's still tough. It's still got that Godsmack edge to it, but it's not quite as angry, maybe, as the past stuff has been. But it's still got its rawness...Well, I shouldn't say that. There's a couple of nasty fuckin' songs on this record. But all in all I think it's just really, I think, some well written stuff. I'm really proud of it." Erna found inspiration after reading Rush drummer Neil Peart's book Ghost Rider: Travels on the Healing Road, and penned the new song "Serenity", which Merrill says is similar in motif to the tribal-drum sound of Godsmack's past hit "Voodoo".

== Release ==
Faceless debuted at number one on the Billboard 200, selling 269,000 copies in its first week, and the album would go on to sell over one million copies in the United States, Faceless beat Linkin Park's Meteora, which dropped to number two on the Billboard 200. Faceless also debuted at number nine on the Top Canadian Albums and at number one on the Top Internet Albums and remained at the specific chart for two weeks.

The second single "Straight Out of Line" received a Grammy Award nomination for "Best Hard Rock Performance." The award went to Evanescence's single, "Bring Me to Life".

Erna remembered that the band was rehearsing for the tour a few months back when they got the news that the album had debuted at number one on the Billboard 200 album chart. "Well, we were in West Palm Beach, Florida rehearsing for this tour and the call came in and it blew my mind because we worked really hard on this record and we wanted people to love it and we wanted it to do well," Erna says. "But we had no idea that it would be the Number One album in the country and it's very gratifying to know that you're rewarded at times for the hard work you do."

The song "I Fucking Hate You" appeared in the TV spots for the movie Pirates of the Caribbean: The Curse of the Black Pearl, albeit an instrumental version.

== Reception ==
Professional ratings
Aggregate scores
Source	Rating
Metacritic	50/100
Review scores
Source	Rating
AllMusic	2.5/5 stars
Alternative Press	4/5 stars
Blender	2/5 stars
E!	B
Entertainment Weekly	C−
Q	1/5 stars
Rolling Stone	2/5 stars

The album received generally mixed reviews from critics upon its release. It holds a score of 50/100 on review aggregate site Metacritic, indicating "mixed or average reviews".

Wade Kergan, writing for AllMusic, awarded the album two and a half out of five stars and commented that although the album has "successful moments", but lacks the "pop hooks" of their debut and often sounds "sorely underwritten". Chris Willman for Entertainment Weekly was similarly lukewarm towards the album, calling it "the same staccato riffing, constipated vocals, and generic, rage-against-the-kidney-stone angst." Christian Hoard of Rolling Stone also denigrated the album, awarding it two stars and commenting that although the music is "well-constructed", it "sounds like a nightmare that's more played-out than scary."

Some critics were more positive regarding the album, however. AntiMusic's review felt that the group "hit(s) a little harder" and praised the album as Godsmack's "strongest effort to date", awarding the album four stars. KNAC also awarded the album four stars and called the album "good loud aggressive heavy (slightly) pop-rock."

== Track listing ==
No.	Title	Writer(s)	Length
1.	"Straight Out of Line"	Erna	4:19
2.	"Faceless"	Erna	3:35
3.	"Changes"	Erna, Rombola	4:19
4.	"Make Me Believe"	Erna	4:08
5.	"I Stand Alone"	Erna	4:06
6.	"Re-Align"	Erna	4:20
7.	"I Fucking Hate You"	Erna	4:07
8.	"Releasing the Demons"	Erna	4:12
9.	"Dead and Broken"	Erna	4:11
10.	"I Am"	Erna	3:59
11.	"The Awakening"	Erna	1:29
12.	"Serenity"	Erna, Rombola	4:34
Total length:			47:19

Japan bonus track
No.	Title	Writer(s)	Length
13.	"Keep Away" (Live)	Erna	7:42
Total length:			55:01

UK bonus tracks
No.	Title	Writer(s)	Length
13.	"Keep Away" (Live)	Erna	7:42
14.	"Awake" (Live)	Erna	5:39
Total length:			60:40

== Personnel ==
Godsmack

- Sully Erna – lead vocals, rhythm guitar, additional drums, talk box on "I Stand Alone"
- Tony Rombola – lead guitar, backing vocals
- Robbie Merrill – bass
- Shannon Larkin – drums, percussion

Production

- Sully Erna – production
- David Bottrill – production, engineering, mixing
- Kent Hertz – additional engineering, Pro Tools
- Marc Stephen Lee – assistant engineer, Pro Tools
- Ben Meeengya – assistant engineer, additional Pro Tools
- Bob Ludwig – mastering
- Kurt Schneck – crew
- Frank Sgambelone – crew
- Kevin Sheehy – assistant
- "Viggy" Vignola – programming
- Richie Voutselas – crew

Artwork

- P. R. Brown – art direction, design, photography

== Charts ==
Album

Chart (2003)	Peak position
Canadian Albums Chart	9
Dutch Albums Chart	98
German Albums Chart	70
New Zealand Albums Chart	36
UK Albums Chart	154
The Billboard 200	1
Top Internet Albums	1

Singles

Year	Song	Chart	Peak position
2002	"I Stand Alone"	Hot Mainstream Rock Tracks	1
2002	"I Stand Alone"	Alternative Songs	20
2002	"I Stand Alone"	Dutch Singles Chart	70
2002	"I Stand Alone"	German Singles Chart	98
2003	"Straight Out of Line"	Hot Mainstream Rock Tracks	1
2003	"Straight Out of Line"	Alternative Songs	9
2003	"Straight Out of Line"	Billboard Hot 100	73
2003	"Serenity"	Hot Mainstream Rock Tracks	7
2004	"Serenity"	Alternative Songs	10
2004	"Re-Align"	Hot Mainstream Rock Tracks	3
2004	"Re-Align"	Alternative Songs	28

== Certifications ==
Faceless was certified Platinum by the Recording Industry Association of America a mere five weeks after the album's release in April.

Region	Certification	Certified units/sales
Canada (Music Canada)	Gold	50,000^{^}
United States (RIAA)	Platinum	1,500,000
^{^} Shipments figures based on certification alone.

== Release history ==
Country	Date	Label
Australasia	April 3, 2003	Universal
United States	April 8, 2003	Republic/Universal
United Kingdom	April 22, 2003	Universal International
