= Robbie Merrill =

American bassist (born 1963)

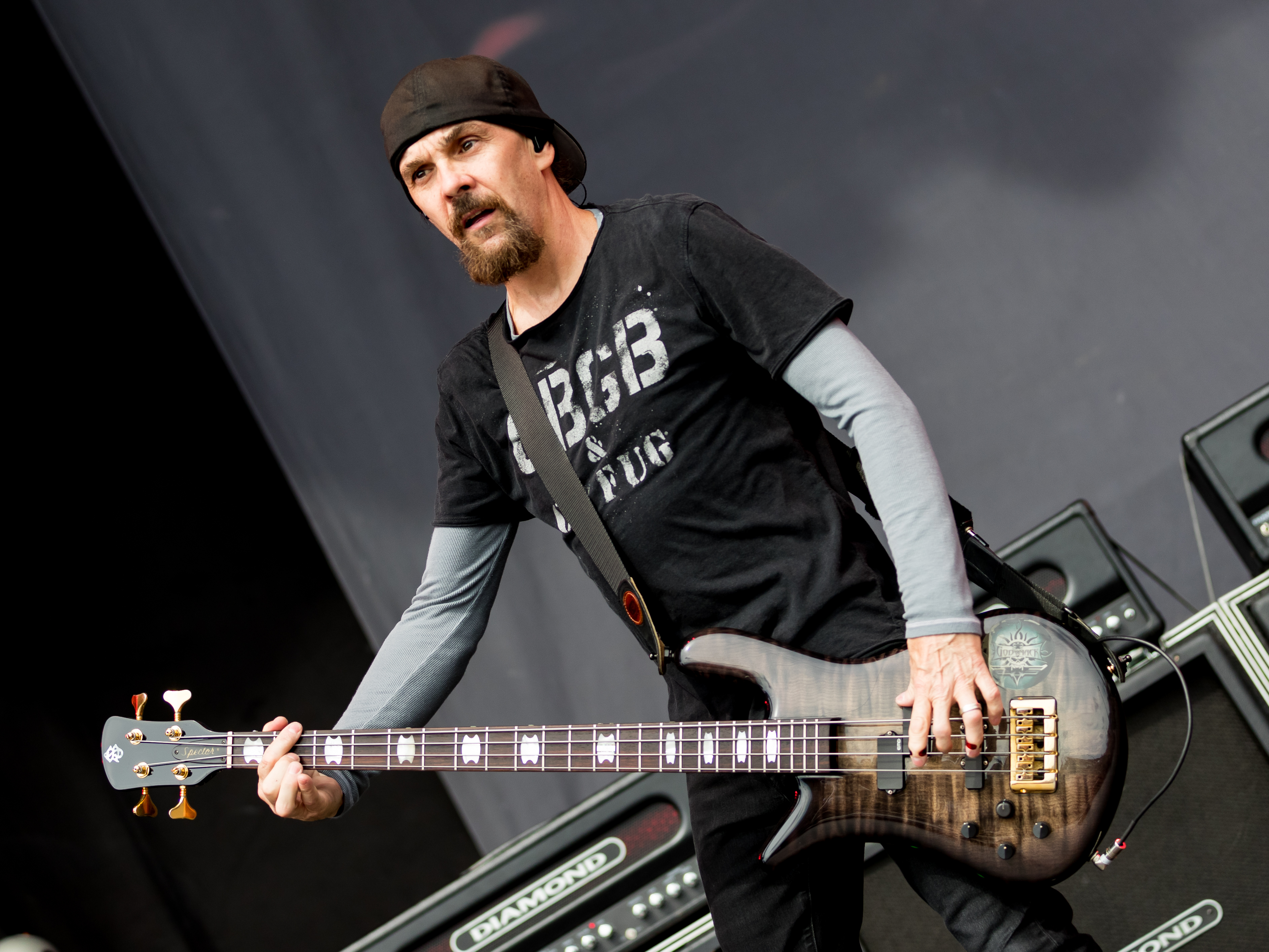
- Merrill performing with Godsmack in 2019

Background information
- Born: June 13, 1963 (age 63); Lawrence, Massachusetts, U.S.
- Genres: Hard rock; post-grunge; heavy metal; nu metal; alternative metal
- Instrument: Bass
- Years active: 1986–present
- Member of: Godsmack
- Formerly of: Another Animal
- Website: godsmack.com

Robbie Merrill (born June 13, 1963) is an American bassist, best known as a founding member of the rock bands Godsmack and Another Animal. He was featured in the Behind the Player interactive music video.

== Biography ==
Born in Lawrence, Massachusetts, Merrill started playing bass at age fourteen, having traded in his train set for the instrument. He was inspired to pick up the bass by watching his father, a guitarist, and his uncle, a bassist. He began playing entirely by ear, gradually gaining musical versatility by performing in a variety of genres, including country, 1950s and 1960s cover bands, and wedding bands. This broad experience laid the foundation for his adaptive playing style. His first bass was a Fender Precision, which he used to record the early Godsmack demos that would form the basis of the band's debut album. Before joining Godsmack, Merrill worked as a self-employed carpenter, a trade likewise pursued by Tony Rombola.

Merrill lives in Florida, with his three daughters. Although he is right-handed, Merrill plays left-handed due to a birth defect that renders him unable to move the middle finger of his left hand.

== Musical style ==
Merrill uses Dunlop Clear "D" plastic fingerpicks on his plucking-hand index and ring fingers, which contributes to his distinctive style of play.

== Discography ==
=== Godsmack ===
- 1998: Godsmack
- 2000: Awake
- 2003: Faceless
- 2004: The Other Side
- 2006: IV
- 2007: Good Times, Bad Times... Ten Years of Godsmack
- 2010: The Oracle
- 2012: Live & Inspired
- 2014: 1000hp
- 2018: When Legends Rise
- 2023: Lighting Up The Sky

=== Another Animal ===
- 2007: Another Animal

== Gear ==
- Bass Spector Euro 4LX-35.
- Fretless Spector 4-string D'Addario XL strings tuned DADG or CGCG; Dunlop Clear "D" fingerpicks.
- (Up Through the Oracle album)-Rig SWR 750x heads and SWR 4 x 12" 12-STACK cabs.
- (Current)-Gallien-Krueger Fusion 550 head, and Gallien-Krueger RBH410 cabs.
- Effects Line 6 PODxt (studio), Line 6 Bass PODxt (live).
- Aurora Strings.
- On the back cover of the April 2010 Bass Player magazine issue, Robbie is now an official Gallien-Krueger user. It shows him with a Fusion 550 amp and a NEO412 cabinet

According to Merrill, when he is in the studio, he runs a Line 6 guitar POD direct for growly, midrangy distortion, and he blends that with miked cabinets."
