= Godsmack =

American rock band

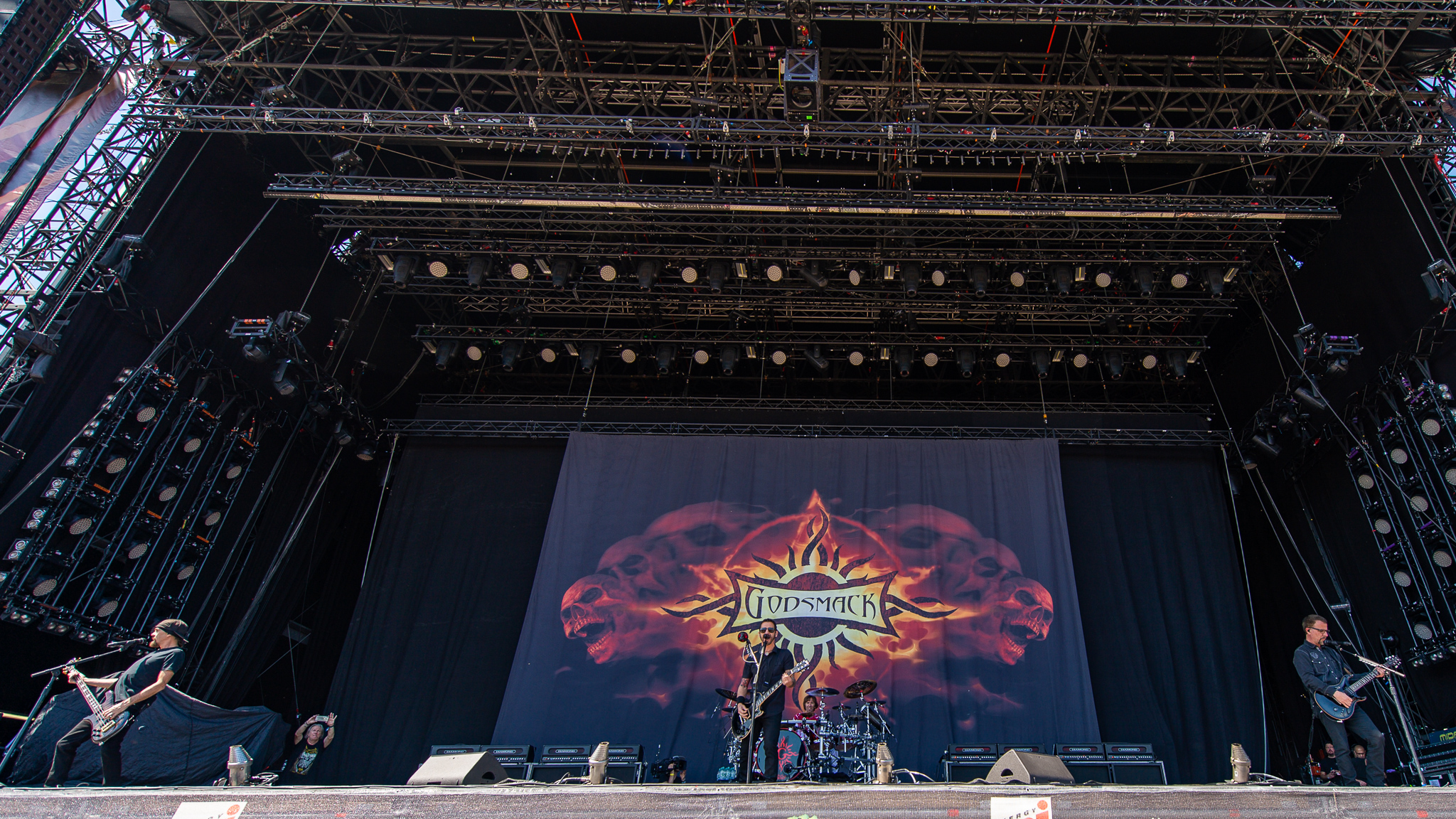
- Godsmack performing at Rock im Park in 2019. From left to right: Robbie Merrill, Sully Erna, Shannon Larkin, and Tony Rombola.

Background information
- Also known as: The Scam (1995)
- Origin: Lawrence, Massachusetts, U.S.
- Genres: Alternative metal; hard rock; nu metal; post-grunge
- Years active: 1995–present
- Labels: Universal; Republic; BMG
- Spinoffs: Another Animal
- Members: Sully Erna; Robbie Merrill; Sam Koltun
- Past members: Tommy Stewart; Lee Richards; Tony Rombola; Joe D'Arco; Shannon Larkin
- Website: godsmack.com

Godsmack is an American rock band from Lawrence, Massachusetts, formed in 1995. The band is currently composed of lead singer and rhythm guitarist Sully Erna, bassist Robbie Merrill, and lead guitarist Sam Koltun. Since its formation, Godsmack has released nine studio albums, one EP (The Other Side), four DVDs, one compilation album (Good Times, Bad Times... Ten Years of Godsmack), and two live albums. Their most recent album, Lighting Up the Sky, was released in 2023.

Since its inception, Godsmack has toured with Ozzfest on more than one occasion and has toured with many other large tours and festivals, including supporting its albums with its own arena tours. They released three consecutive number-one albums (Faceless, IV and The Oracle) on the Billboard 200, and have had 25 top-ten rock radio hits and 12 at number one. In honor of the band's success and the release of their sixth studio album, 1000hp, Mayor Marty Walsh declared August 6 as "Godsmack Day" in the city of Boston.

== History ==
=== Formation and All Wound Up... (1995–1997) ===
In February 1995, Sully Erna decided to start a new band as the lead singer after playing the drums for more than 23 years, including more than two years in the now-defunct band Strip Mind. His new band, The Scam, formed with Erna on vocals, Robbie Merrill on bass, local guitarist and friend Lee Richards on guitar, and Tommy Stewart on drums. The Scam quickly changed its name to Godsmack, after recording one demo. The newly formed band started playing small bars in their hometown of Boston. Locally popular songs such as "Keep Away" and "Whatever" soon brought them to the top of the hit charts in the Boston/New England area.

The band's name does not derive from the Alice in Chains song of the same name; according to Erna, the name instead came from an incident where he developed a cold sore shortly after a former bandmate did:

"I was making fun of [our drummer at the time] who had a cold sore on his lip and the next day I had one myself and somebody said, 'It's a god smack.' The name stuck. We were aware of the Alice In Chains song but didn't really think much about it."

In 1996, Tony Rombola joined as the guitarist after Richards left upon learning he had a six-year-old child and Stewart left due to personal differences. In the same year, the band entered New Alliance Studio in Boston to record its debut album, All Wound Up.... The CD was recorded in just three days for $2,600 and was self-released in February 1997 through the band's own record label, E. K. Records Company. In May 1997, Joe D'Arco joined to replace Stewart on drums.

Eventually, Godsmack's CD landed in the hands of Rocko, the night-time DJ for Boston radio station WAAF (FM). The radio station put "Keep Away" into heavy rotation and the song rose to the number one spot at the station very quickly. Newbury Comics, a New England record store chain, agreed to sell the CD on consignment. Shortly after the success of "Keep Away", Godsmack went back into the studio and recorded a single titled "Whatever", which became the new local favorite on WAAF (FM). In an interview Sully Erna stated, "We had been selling maybe 50 copies a month at the time WAAF picked up the album. All of a sudden we started moving over a thousand records a week. (...) I was doing all this from my bedroom. After years of grinding away, things finally started taking off." In April 1998, D'Arco was dismissed from the band. He was replaced by former drummer Tommy Stewart, who returned after expressing a desire to be in the band again.

=== Godsmack (1998–1999) ===
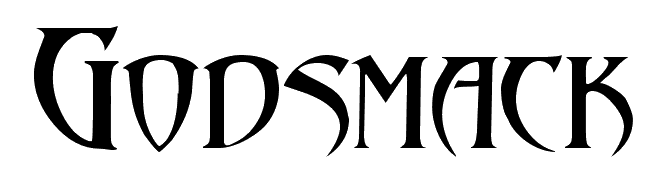
Band logotype used from Awake to 1000hp.

In June 1998, Universal/Republic Records signed the band to their label. The band's first album All Wound Up... was slightly edited to remove unlicensed samples, fully re-mastered and given a new artwork and layout; the finished self-titled album Godsmack was released to the public six weeks later on August 25, 1998. This led to the band's first headlining tour, "The Godsmack Tour" with Jim Rose Circus as the opening act. After the album's release the band went on the road playing club shows as well as playing at Ozzfest and Woodstock '99. This was followed by a tour in Europe supporting Black Sabbath. Roxanne Blanford from Allmusic gave the album three out of five stars, stating, "Godsmack confidently brought metal into the technological age". The album entered the Billboard 200 at number twenty-two, and was certified 5× platinum by the Recording Industry Association of America in 2024 after being initially certified gold in 1999.

The album sold well despite being initially pulled from the shelves in some stores due to concerns over some of its lyrical content. The band and its record label later added a Parental Advisory sticker to the album, and some stores ordered amended copies of the album. Erna commented in Rolling Stone magazine stating, "Our record has been in the marketplace for more than a year now without a parental advisory sticker and this is the one and only complaint ... Stickers and lyrics are by nature subjective ... We have decided to put a sticker on the record." This controversy did not appear to adversely affect album sales but, according to Erna, helped; "It's almost taunting kids to go out and get the record to see what we're saying on it." The album also had four successful singles which were "Whatever", "Keep Away", "Voodoo" and "Bad Religion".

=== Awake (2000–2001) ===
"Vampires"
Sample of "Vampires", an instrumental song from Awake, which received a Grammy nomination for Best Rock Instrumental Performance.

In 2000, Godsmack returned to the studio after the multi-platinum success of Godsmack to start recording Awake. The album was released on October 31, 2000. The album debuted at number five on the Billboard 200, and has been certified 2× platinum by the RIAA. "Vampires", a song on the album, also earned the band a Grammy nomination for Best Rock Instrumental Performance in 2002. With the release of Awake, Godsmack toured Europe supporting Limp Bizkit. Erna said at the time, "We've been touring nonstop since August 1998, So most of Awake was written on tour while we were ping-ponging between America and Europe, building up the band. "Ozzfest" was actually the only big tour where we rode under someone else's wings; we did a lot of work on our own." The band played Ozzfest in 2000 again as they had in 1999. On July 19, 2001, Godsmack released their first live DVD titled Live. The DVD has since been certified Gold by the RIAA for selling 50,000 copies in the United States.

Two of the songs on the album were used in United States Navy commercials ("Sick of Life" and "Awake") as background music. Erna stated, "Someone in the military is a fan, and they asked if they could use the music, and we accepted". However, Erna insisted in an interview that Godsmack does not support any war.

=== The Scorpion King, Faceless and The Other Side (2002–2004) ===
In 2002, Erna was asked to write and perform a song for the soundtrack to The Scorpion King. The song Godsmack wrote and performed was titled "I Stand Alone" and the song became the number 1 single at Rock Radio and the most played Active Rock song in 2002 for 14 weeks straight. It was also used in the game Prince of Persia: Warrior Within.

With Shannon Larkin (ex Ugly Kid Joe, Souls at Zero, Wrathchild America, MF Pitbulls) replacing Tommy Stewart, who left due to personal differences for the second time, Godsmack went back into the studio later that year to record a new album that was released in 2003. Faceless debuted at number one on the Billboard 200, selling 269,000 copies in its first week, and the album would go on to sell over one million copies in the United States. Faceless also debuted at number nine on the Top Canadian Albums and at number one on the Top Internet Albums and remained at that position for two weeks. A massive Tour of America and Europe supporting Metallica followed.

The lead single "Straight Out of Line" received a Grammy Award nomination for "Best Hard Rock Performance". The award went to Evanescence's single "Bring Me to Life". The album got its name after a swimming-pool incident. However, in a later interview Merrill stated otherwise, making it unclear of how the album's title came to be, "It came from the band's feeling that, despite our radio and sales success, we still flew a bit under the radar".

On March 16, 2004 The Other Side, an acoustic EP, was released. The album debuted at number five on the Billboard 200, a relatively high position for an acoustic EP. It included several previously released songs re-recorded as acoustic versions, as well as three new acoustic tracks. One new song, "Touché", featured Godsmack's first guitar player, Lee Richards, as well as John Kosco, who were at that time in the now defunct band Dropbox, The other two new acoustic tracks were "Running Blind" and "Voices". The song "Asleep" is actually an acoustic version of "Awake" from the band's second album Awake. Godsmack shifted from its "heavy" sound to a more mellow acoustic sound on this EP in the same manner Alice in Chains did in the Sap and Jar of Flies EPs, one of many similarities to Alice in Chains for which the band has been criticized.

In 2004, Godsmack opened for Metallica's "Madly in Anger with the World tour", and headlined the tour along with Dropbox. Afterwards, in autumn 2004, the band played several acoustic shows to promote The Other Side, while at the same time continuing to open for Metallica.

=== IV and Ten Years of Godsmack (2006–2008) ===
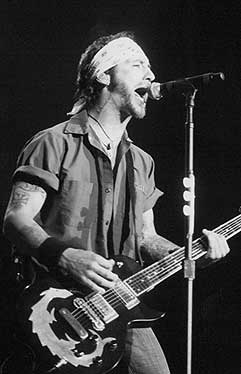
Sully Erna performing during Godsmack's IV Tour in 2006

Throughout 2006, The band was in the studio recording and writing material for a new album. On April 25, 2006, Godsmack released its fourth studio album simply titled IV, followed by a tour that would continue until January 2008, titled "The IV tour". The album was produced by Erna and engineered by the well known producer and engineer Andy Johns, known for engineering Led Zeppelin's Led Zeppelin IV. The first single from the album, "Speak" was released on February 14, 2006. The album debuted at number one on the Billboard 200, selling 211,000 copies in its first week.

IV has since been certified gold. The band had written over forty songs for the album, but the final track listing had eleven tracks, Larkin commented, "it's Sully's band and his vision.[...]When it comes time to pick the songs it's all Sully". The album's minimalist name "IV" derives not only from its being the band's fourth studio album, but also from a running piece of backstage humor, as related by Larkin and Erna in an interview.

To celebrate ten years as a band, Godsmack released a greatest hits album entitled Good Times, Bad Times... Ten Years of Godsmack on December 4, 2007. The album debuted at number thirty-five on the Billboard 200, selling 40,000 copies in the first week of release. It includes a cover of the Led Zeppelin song "Good Times Bad Times", as well as a DVD of Godsmack's acoustic performance in Las Vegas at House of Blues. The album was originally intended to be a boxed set, but the band scrapped the plans so they could release a best of album. Godsmack would follow the release of the album with an acoustic tour. Despite rumors of the band going on hiatus as a result of releasing a greatest hits album, Erna was quoted as saying, "we're not going away, we are just gonna take a break and enjoy our 10th year anniversary and kind of recharge our batteries. And then Godsmack will be back, and we will come back bigger and badder than ever."

=== The Oracle and break (2008–2013) ===
In November 2008, Larkin announced that the band would be reforming and recording a new album. The following summer, the band toured as support to Mötley Crüe's Crüe Fest 2 tour and released a non-album single, "Whiskey Hangover". After the tour, Godsmack started production for their new album. The album, titled The Oracle was released on May 4, 2010. Arriving to popular reception, The Oracle was Godsmack's third straight full-length studio album to debut at No. 1 with 117,000 sold in the first week of release. Erna had this to say about the early sound album, "It's gonna be really heavy. I mean, it's very aggressive. I'm not really sure; it's very premature right now. Right now we just finished one track for the Crüe Fest this Summer. But as far as the whole record goes, I think it's going to be a lot more in your face. I don't think there's going to be any 'Voodoo's or 'Serenity's on this one. We decided to go balls out!".

Godsmack headlined the fourth annual Mayhem Festival alongside Disturbed. The band entered the studio in January 2012 to mix a live album plus record several covers for an upcoming release. They then went on tour in the spring with Staind. In February 2012, Godsmack finished an EP of cover songs. Godsmack released their new live album Live & Inspired on May 15, 2012. The set included a bonus EP of cover tracks. In December of the same year, Sully said in an interview that Godsmack would take a break during 2013, stating "We're going to take some time away now because we just ran for the last two years." A month after, Erna announced a short solo tour through America.

=== 1000hp (2014–2016) ===
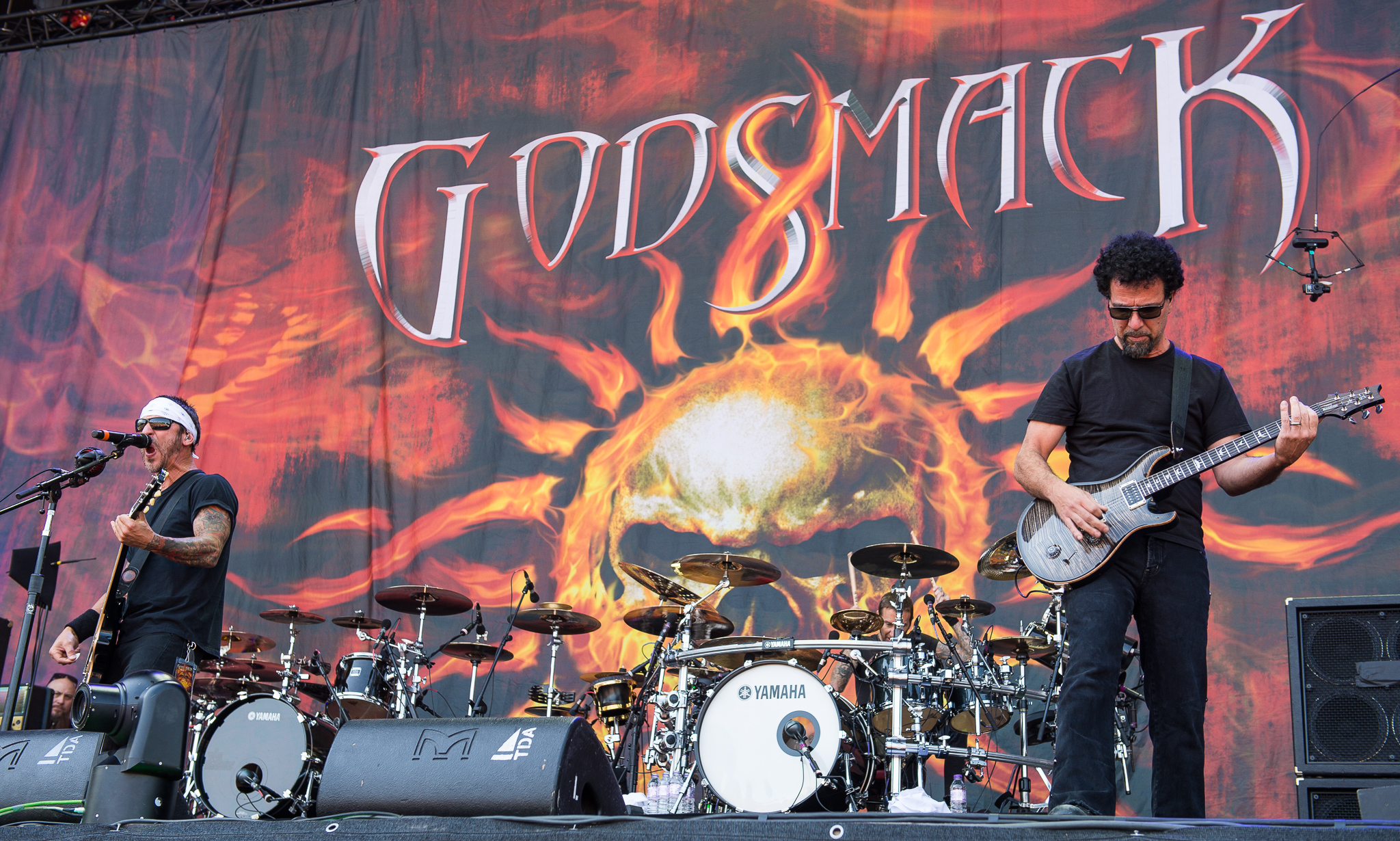
Godsmack performing in 2015

In February 2014, Erna announced that the band had made progress in the songwriting process for its next studio album, tentatively scheduled for a late 2014 release. He also mentioned that the band finished 11 songs for the new record in two weeks. In April, the band announced that they had recorded 15 songs, ten of which would make the final cut. In May, Erna announced that the album would be titled 1000hp (1000 Horsepower). The album's title track was released as a single the following month. The album was released on August 5, 2014, and sold around 58,000 copies in the United States in its first week of release to land at position No. 3 on The Billboard 200 chart. Since release the album has spawned the singles Something Different and What's Next. The band have unified a campaign to aid military veterans with the single What's Next.

Godsmack also headlined the 2014 Uproar Festival. They were announced on August 20, 2014, to be part of the Soundwave Festival in Australia. In July 2015, the band revealed dates for an upcoming North American fall headline tour. The run included dates with Sevendust. Also in August 2015 Godsmack announced a new leg of North American dates that would keep the band busy through mid-November.

On October 14, 2015, Godsmack released a digital single called "Inside Yourself" available for a limited free download. On September 9, 2016, Erna confirmed that the band had officially left Universal/Republic, and signed a deal with BMG.

=== When Legends Rise (2017–2020) ===
The band began work on a seventh studio album in 2017. The album, When Legends Rise, was released on April 27, 2018. The album's title track was released as the second single. The album's first single, "Bulletproof", was released ahead of the album on February 28, 2018. The band toured across North America from May through October 2018. They played at several festivals before embarking on a co-headlining summer tour with Shinedown. The band then toured Europe in October and November 2018 in support of their new album. However, On October 17, 2018, it was announced that the band postponed their fall 2018 Europe tour, following death of Tony Rombola's son and plan to reschedule in early 2019.

On July 25, 2019, the song "Under Your Scars" hit number 1 for two weeks for the first time on the Billboard Mainstream Rock Songs chart.

On April 8, 2020, the band released a music video for the song "Unforgettable". The band invited 400 aspiring musicians from middle school students across New England to take part in the video. The video, directed by Noah Berlow, again sent the song to the top of the charts for five weeks, setting a new record most constitutive at number 1 in its category.

=== Lighting Up the Sky (2021–2024) ===
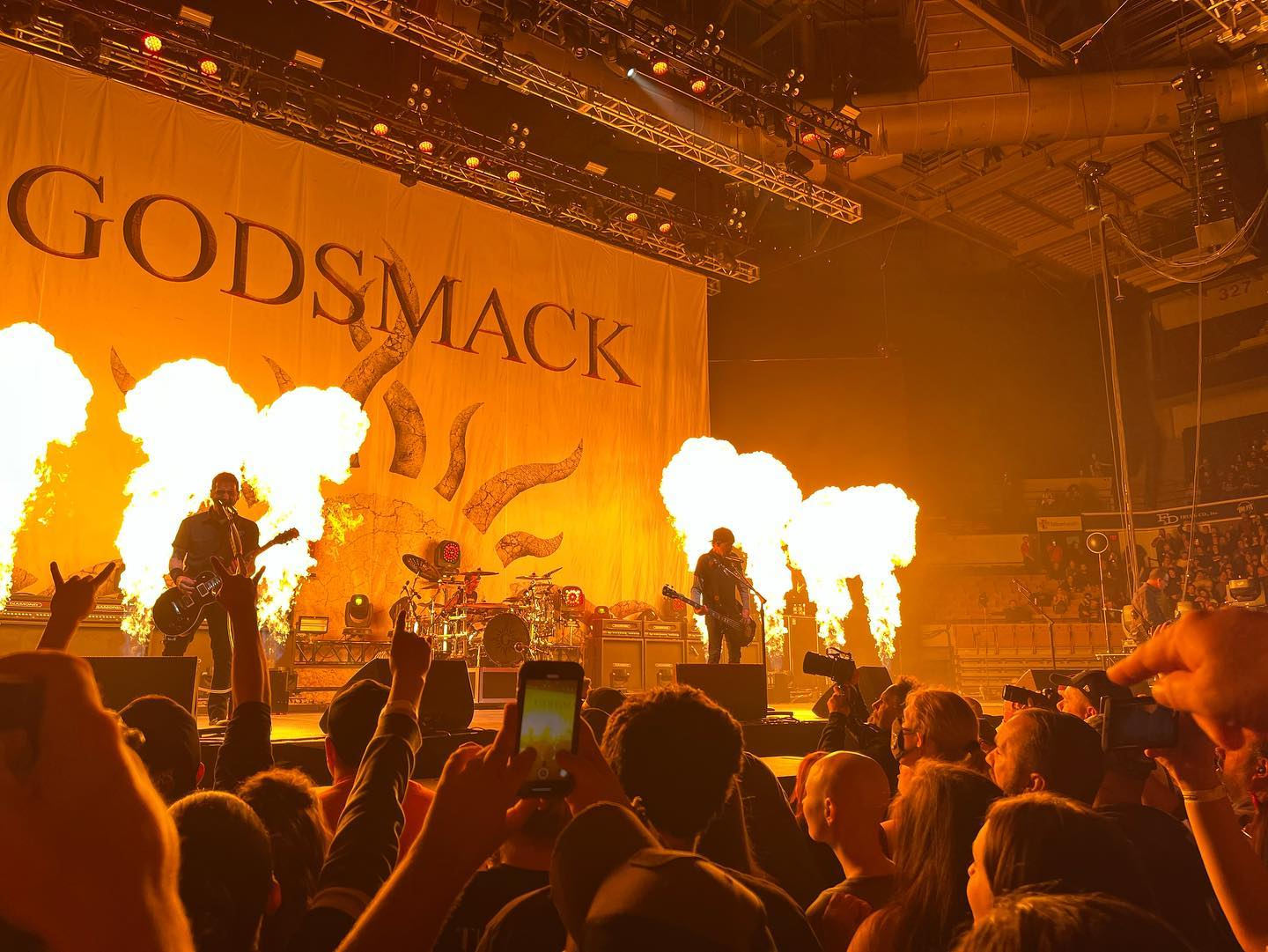
Godsmack performing in Worcester, Massachusetts, in 2022

News of a follow-up to the album began circulating as early as August 2019 when frontman Sully Erna revealed in an interview with Canada's iHeartRadio that the band has been preparing to begin the songwriting process for the album.

It was later revealed that Godsmack would be working on two new releases for 2021: an acoustic EP and a full-length album. That plan has since been scrapped with Sully admitting that the band was being "a little bit more ambitious" at the time.

With just one album to focus on, Godsmack drummer Shannon Larkin said on "The Metal Teddy Bear Experience" podcast that the band intended for the album to be released in 2022. In an April 23, 2022, interview with WJRR, frontman Sully Erna said that the band has finished recording the new album with a new single expected to hit the airwaves in mid-to-late summer and that the album could be the band's last.

On September 28, 2022, the band released the single titled "Surrender". Shortly after the release of the new single, Sully Erna revealed in an interview with 93X Radio's Pablo that the title of the album would be Lighting Up the Sky and that it would indeed be the band's last record. A second single for the album "You and I" was released on November 11, 2022. The album was released on February 24, 2023. The album had two more singles, "Soul on Fire" and "Truth".

=== Departures of Rombola and Larkin and upcoming tenth studio album (2025–present) ===
On April 2, 2025, it was announced that guitarist Tony Rombola and drummer Shannon Larkin had both left Godsmack in 2024, citing exhaustion after years of touring. Following their departure, drummer Will Hunt and guitarist Sam Koltun joined as fill-ins for Larkin and Rombola on the band's month-long 2025 European tour, which concluded in early April. Following the tour, frontman Sully Erna announced that the band would go on a year-long hiatus, during which he might work on some solo material. Also, in December 2025, despite previous statements that Lighting Up the Sky would be the final Godsmack album, Erna hinted at the possibility of recording a follow-up album; he later clarified that it was to be the last album with that particular, "classic" lineup.

The band was confirmed to be performing at the 2026 Sonic Temple music festival in Columbus, Ohio. They are also confirmed to be appearing at Welcome to Rockville taking place in Daytona Beach, Florida in May 2026.

On February 2, 2026, it was announced that Godsmack would be doing a North American tour with Stone Temple Pilots and Dorothy on "The Rise Of Rock" tour from May to September 2026.

In March 13, 2026, Godsmack announced their second live album, Live At Mohegan Sun. The album doubles as a concert video and is set to be released on May 1.

On June 12, 2026, Mike Mangini played his first show with Godsmack on drums after Wade Murff left to play for Black Veil Brides across what remained of their 2026 European tour.

== Musical style and influences ==
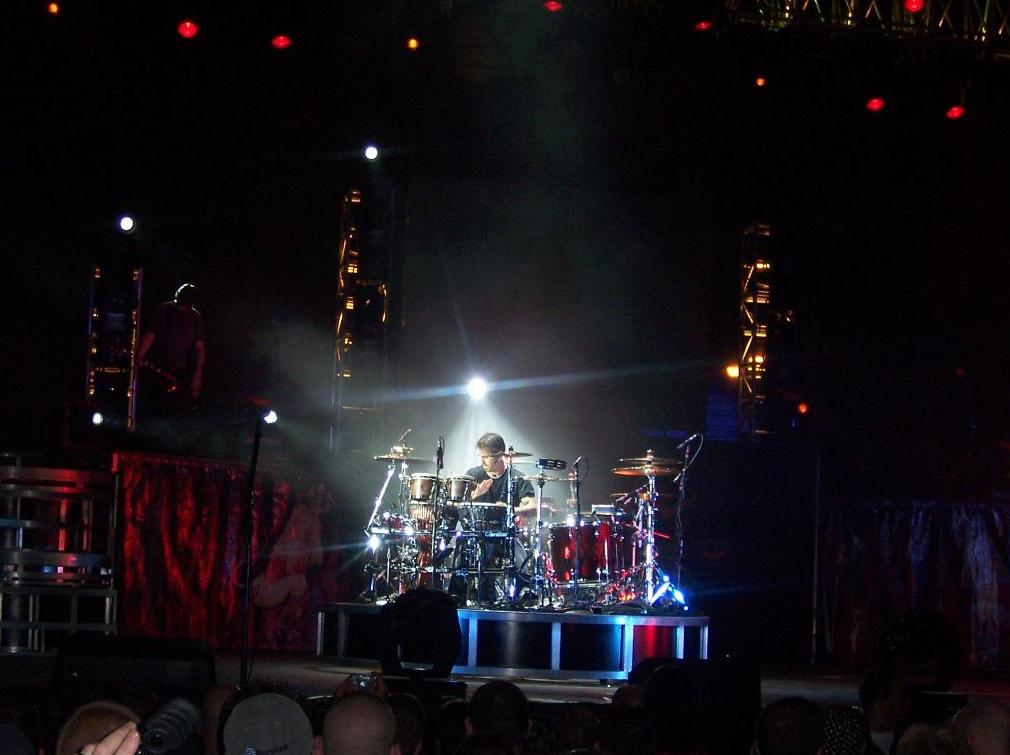
Sully Erna playing a drum solo

Godsmack emerged from the post-grunge, and nu metal scenes in the late 1990s, and has been described as alternative metal, hard rock, and heavy metal. The band's primary influences include Aerosmith, Alice in Chains, Black Sabbath, Led Zeppelin, Metallica, Pantera and Rush according to Erna, Larkin, and Rombola. Erna credits Layne Staley with inspiring him to start singing, and considers James Hetfield as a primary influence. Erna himself emphasized the band as being hard rock instead of metal. Regarding the nu metal classification, he said: "Our biggest struggle over the years was we got lumped into that 'nu-metal' category when we got signed, because the Korns and the Limp Bizkits and all them were kind of blowing up. And we were never that, though."

The overall sound of the band's first two albums have been compared to Alice in Chains' album Dirt. However, Godsmack has attempted to distance themselves from the Alice in Chains comparison with Erna stating in an interview with Matt Ashare, "I've just never really heard that in our music."

The band's music is often compared to Alice in Chains which the band cites as an influence. Adrien Begrand of PopMatters states, "Erna perfectly mimics the late Layne Staley's low, guttural, sinister singing and snarly, metal-inspired growls" and, "The band's music is a faithful retread of Jerry Cantrell's churning, tuned-down hard rock".

Erna's singing style has been stated as "the snarl of James Hetfield", and "composed of dark harmony that sounds a lot like Alice in Chains". Merrill's bass style has been described as "bulldozer bottom with occasional slap-bass reverb". Larkin's drumming is thought to "worship at the twin altars of Neil Peart and John Bonham". And Rombola's guitar playing style has been praised as "guitars that sound like percussion instruments".

== Band members ==
Godsmack at Freedom Mortgage Pavillion, 2026

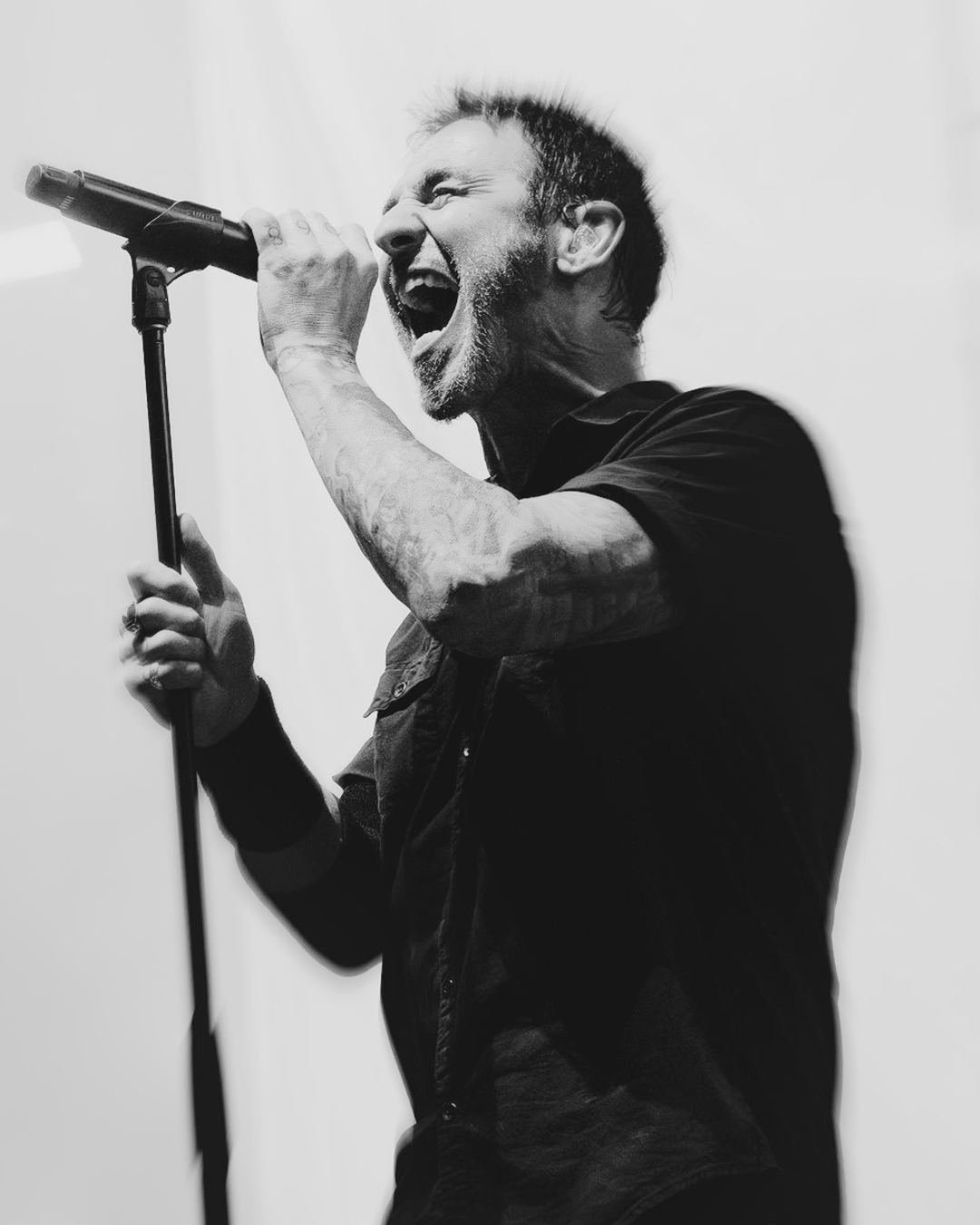
Sully Erna

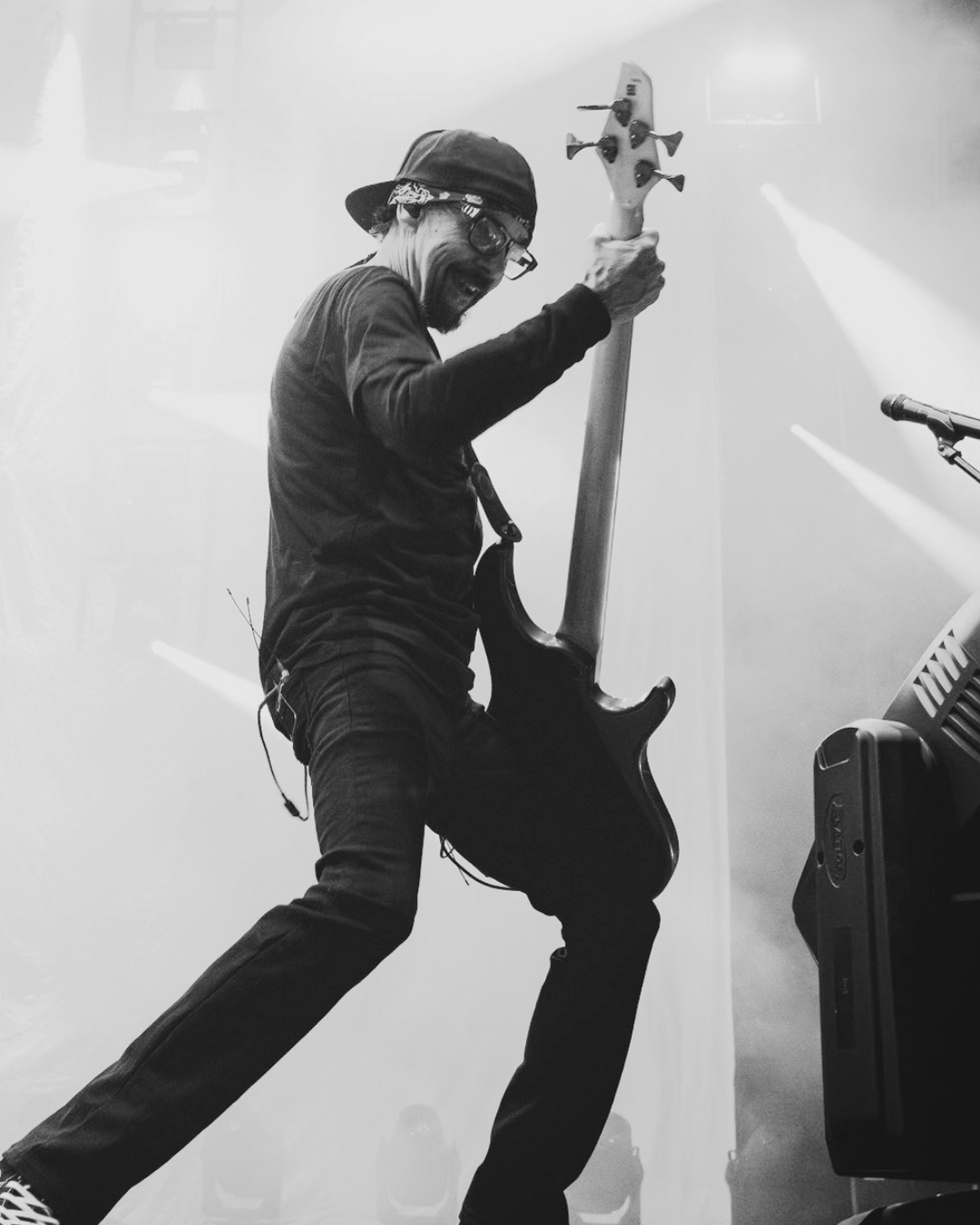
Robbie Merrill

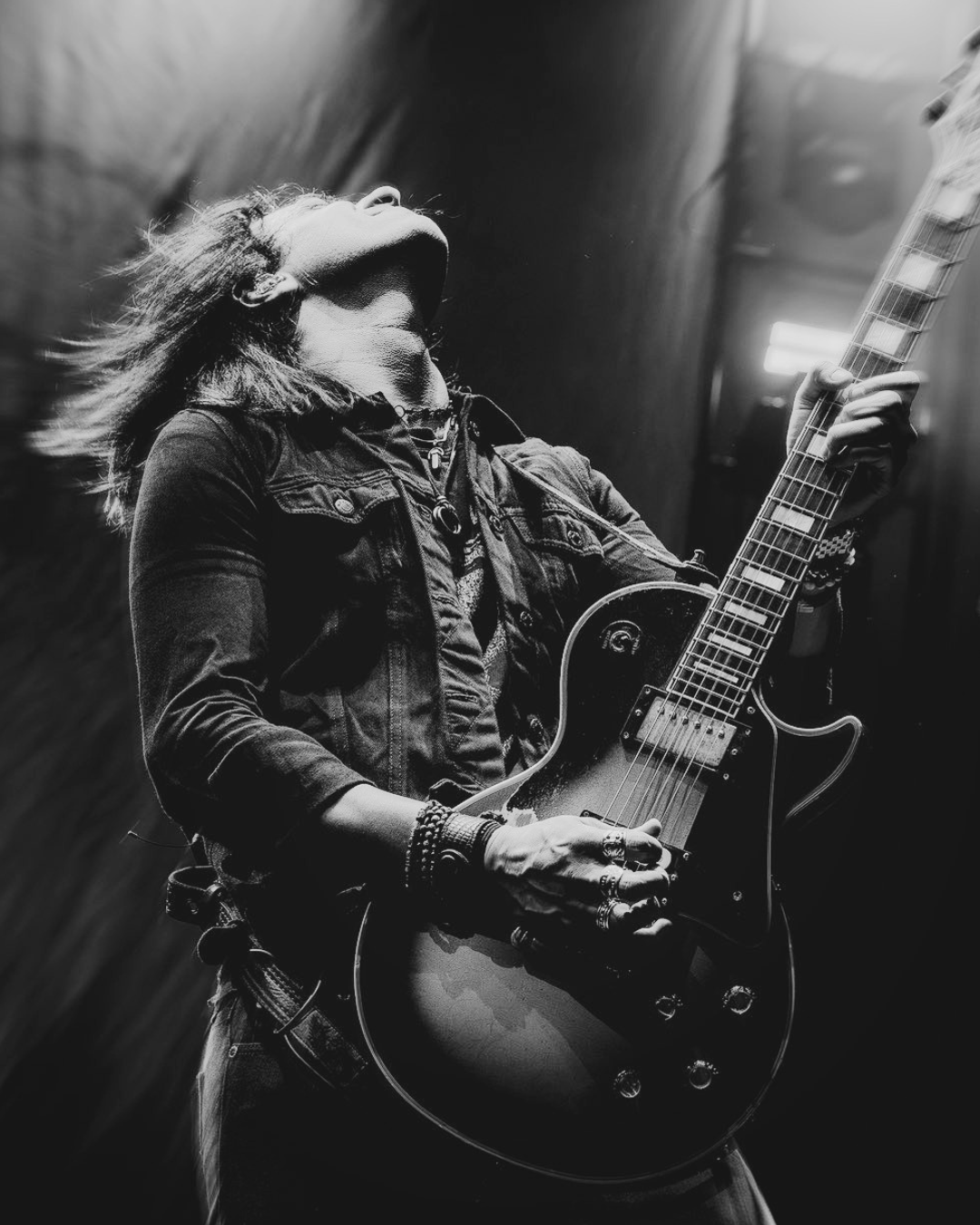
Sam "Bam" Koltun

Current members

- Sully Erna – lead vocals, rhythm guitar, keyboards (1995–present); drums (1996–2003, 2022–2023; in-studio only)
- Robbie Merrill – bass (1995–present), backing vocals (1999–2000, 2009–present)
- Sam Koltun – lead guitar, backing vocals (2025–present; touring 2025)

Current touring and session members

- Mike Mangini – drums (2026–present)

Former members

- Tommy Stewart – drums (1995–1997, 1998–2002), backing vocals (1999–2000)
- Lee Richards – lead guitar (1995–1996)
- Tony Rombola – lead guitar, backing vocals (1996–2024)
- Joe D'Arco – drums (1997–1998; died 2024)
- Shannon Larkin – drums, percussion (2002–2024), backing vocals (2009–2014)

Former touring musicians

- Chris Decato – keyboards (2024)
- Tim Theriault – rhythm guitar (2024)
- Will Hunt – drums (2025)
- Wade Murff – drums (2026)

Timeline

== Discography ==
Studio albums

- All Wound Up... (1997)
- Godsmack (1998)
- Awake (2000)
- Faceless (2003)
- IV (2006)
- The Oracle (2010)
- 1000hp (2014)
- When Legends Rise (2018)
- Lighting Up the Sky (2023)

== Awards and nominations ==
=== Grammy Awards ===
Year	Nominee / work	Award	Result	Ref.
2001	"Vampires"	Best Rock Instrumental Performance	Nominated	
2003	"I Stand Alone"	Best Rock Song	Nominated	
2003	"I Stand Alone"	Best Hard Rock Performance	Nominated	
2004	"Straight Out of Line"	Best Hard Rock Performance	Nominated	

=== Billboard Awards ===
Year	Nominee / work	Award	Result	Ref.
2001	Godsmack	Rock Artist of the Year	Won	
2001	"Awake"	Rock Single of the Year	Nominated	
2006	"Speak"	Rock Single of the Year	Nominated	

=== Boston Music Awards ===
Year	Nominee / work	Award	Result	Ref.
1999	Godsmack	Rising Star	Won	
1999	Godsmack	Outstanding Debut Rock Band	Won	
1999	"Whatever"	Single Of The Year	Won	
1999	Godsmack	Debut Album Of The Year	Won	
2000	Godsmack	Act of the Year	Won	
2000	Godsmack	Outstanding Rock Band	Won	
2000	Sully Erna	Male Vocalist of the Year	Won	
2000	Sully Erna/Godsmack	Song/Songwriter	Won	
2001	"Greed"	Single of the Year	Nominated	
2001	"Greed"	Video of the Year	Nominated	
2001	Awake	Album of the Year	Won	
2001	Sully Erna	Male Vocalist of the Year	Won	
2001	Godsmack	Act of the Year	Won	
2001	Godsmack	Outstanding Rock Band	Won	
2002	Godsmack	Rock Band of the Year	Won	
2002	Sully Erna	Male Vocalist of the Year	Won	
2003	Godsmack	Outstanding Rock/Pop Band	Won	
2006	Godsmack	Hard Rock Act of the Year	Won	

== See also ==
- List of artists who reached number one on the U.S. Mainstream Rock chart
