= Sully Erna =

American rock musician (born 1968)

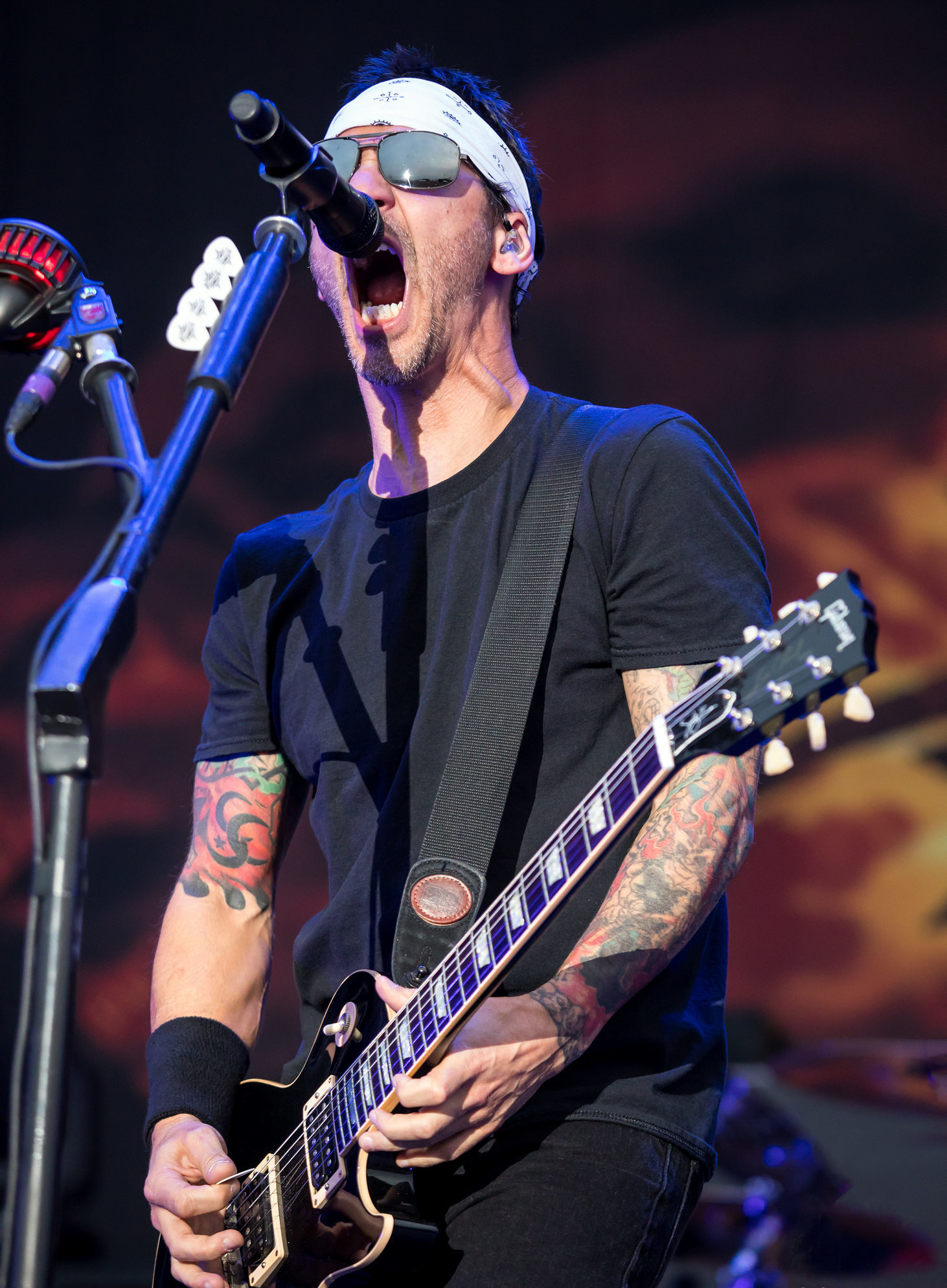
- Erna in 2017

Background information
- Born: Salvatore Paul Erna Jr. February 7, 1968 (age 58); Lawrence, Massachusetts, U.S.
- Genres: Hard rock; post-grunge; nu metal; alternative metal; heavy metal
- Occupations: Singer; musician; songwriter; poker player (casual)
- Instruments: Vocals; guitar; drums; harmonica; piano
- Years active: 1986–present
- Member of: Godsmack
- Formerly of: Meliah Rage; Strip Mind
- Website: sullyerna.com

Salvatore Paul Erna Jr. (born February 7, 1968) is an American musician, best known as the vocalist and rhythm guitarist for rock band Godsmack. He is also a harmonica player, drummer, and percussionist, performing these on albums and at live shows. He was ranked 47th in the Top 100 Heavy Metal Vocalists by Hit Parader.

== Early life ==
Sully Erna was born in Lawrence, Massachusetts. He began playing drums at the age of three. His father, Salvatore Erna Sr., is a trumpet player from Sicily and would rehearse in the basement where Sully would watch. His great-uncle was a famous composer in Sicily. At the age of 11, Erna discovered it was easier playing by ear rather than reading sheet music. He stopped taking lessons and practiced at home, rehearsing to records by Aerosmith, Led Zeppelin, Motörhead, and Rush.

== Musical career ==
At 14, Dave Vose became Erna's new instructor. He signed his first record deal in 1993 with a band called Strip Mind. Their debut album What's in Your Mouth sold fewer than 50,000 units. Some of the band members (mainly the singer) and Erna didn't get along, and Erna was booted out. They split-up shortly after.

In Godsmack concerts, Erna plays the bongos and a large drum set, staging a drumming duel known as "Batalla de los Tambores" with drummer Shannon Larkin. This battle has become a staple of the band's live show. He is also a harmonica player as present on the Godsmack song "Shine Down".

In 2010, Erna released his first solo album Avalon. The album took seven years to complete and differed stylistically from Godsmack. Erna wrapped up his acoustic tour with one final show at The House of Blues in Las Vegas, Nevada on June 28.

Erna has also worked with his local music scene. In April 2005, he participated in New Hampshire's Battle of the Bands Competition. The winner (a band called Zion who hails from Salem) had the opportunity to record a demo at Erna's California studio.

=== Solo work ===
Erna told Glam-Metal.com that doing his first solo shows were "extremely nerve-wracking", adding, "My first show, I was really, really nervous. Honestly, I haven't been that nervous since I was, I don't know, maybe 10 years old at a talent show or something." Erna kicked off his first solo acoustic trek on May 1 in Niagara Falls, New York and closed it out on May 31 in Las Vegas. The shows have combined Godsmack songs with a few new originals and covers ranging from the Beatles to Alice in Chains to the theme from Love Story.

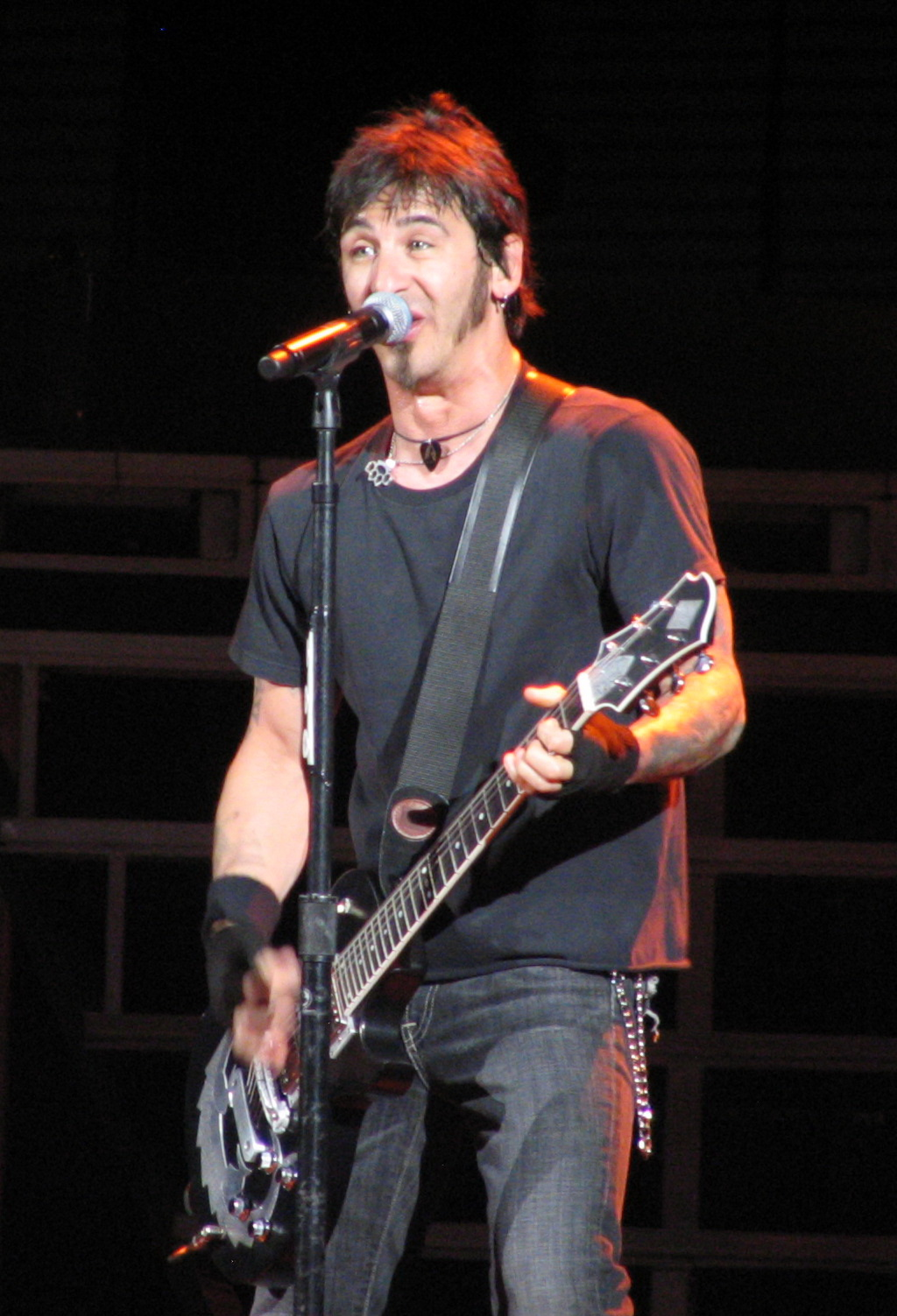
Erna performing in 2006

Erna stated at the time that he planned to work on his first solo album. On March 4, 2009, Blabbermouth.net reported that Erna had completed work on his first solo album, Avalon, released September 14, 2010. Although, the single "Sinner's Prayer" will be on radio stations and on sale everywhere August 3, 2010. Erna described the album as being "a very different kind of sounding record", and "a huge departure from anything I've ever done." The album includes Lisa Guyer on vocals, Tim Theriault on guitars and vocals, Chris Decato on keyboards, midi and vocals, Chris Lester on acoustic guitars and bass, classically trained Irina Chirkova of Bulgaria on Cello, Niall Gregory of Ireland Dead Can Dance on drums and percussion, and David Stephanelli on drums and percussion. In further describing the album's sound, Erna said that "it's very eclectic" and "tribal" with "a lot of hand drumming" and "beautiful piano compositions". He also stated that he "worked with a percussion session for Dead Can Dance" and that the album will feature Lisa Guyer, who had performed backing vocals for the song "Hollow" on Godsmack's previous album.

Avalon was released on September 14, 2010. He released a live DVD, Avalon Live, in fall of 2012.

In July 2016, it was announced that Erna will release his second solo album Hometown Life on September 30, 2016. The album has since been released. Hometown Life includes a song "Turn It Up", for which Erna invited his father into the recording studio to play trumpet on the track. His father performed the song live with Erna at a Sully Erna solo show.

In 2024, Erna featured on country rock artist Cory Marks's single "(Make My) Country Rock" with Travis Tritt and Mick Mars.

== Other activities ==
=== Film and music video appearances ===
Erna is good friends with Criss Angel and has participated in several episodes of the Criss Angel Mindfreak TV show. Erna's contributions to the discography of Criss Angel include co-writing and performing Mindfreak's new theme song "MF2". Erna appears in the music video along with Criss Angel and Godsmack drummer Shannon Larkin.

Erna appeared in episode 7 of the 2007 TV series Dirt. Erna has been named to the cast of Woodhaven Pictures Army of the Damned. In 2016, he appeared as a Caesar's blackjack dealer in the Martin Scorsese-produced film Bleed for This. Erna has reportedly signed on to appear in the movie Street Level. He also stars in a new independent action-thriller called Black Files.

In 2017, Erna appeared in the Bulgarian film Benzin (director Asen Blatechki).

=== Memoir ===
Erna released a memoir entitled The Paths We Choose on his birthday, February 7, 2007. The book details his struggles during the first 30 years of his life, up until the time Godsmack landed a record deal.

"The book is basically just my life from the time I was born until Godsmack started", Erna said. "I wanted to write about the whole experience of trying to get there, and hopefully that will inspire some people that maybe are still in the ghettos or trying to dig their way out of a hole. I mean, we're all human and we weren't born rock stars. So I think there's an interesting story to tell of the pain and struggling. You know, being middle classed and being raised in crazy neighborhoods. If kids can see that they'll be able to relate to anything they have a dream for."

=== Life Story Documentary ===
"I Stand Alone: The Sully Erna Story" is a documentary film, produced, edited, and co-written by Noah Berlow, with direction by Troy Smith.

=== Poker ===
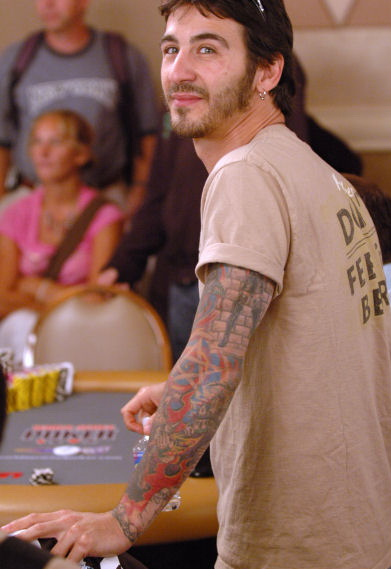
Erna at the World Series of Poker in 2006

Erna participated in the 2006 World Series of Poker main event, in which he made a brief appearance on the ESPN broadcast of the event; it was mentioned that he was the last of the celebrity entries. He finished in 713th out of 8,773 earning him $17,730.

Erna also played in the 2007 World Series of Poker main event. After the elimination of Tobey Maguire, Erna was the final celebrity remaining. He placed in 237th out of a field of 6,358, earning $45,422. To complement his placing at the World Series of Poker, he placed 2nd in a preliminary event at Bellagio's 5 Diamond World Poker Classic, where he lost to J.C Tran but earned $307,325 as a consolation.

Erna also competed in the 2007 VH1 Celebrity Rock and Roll Tournament with Ace Frehley, Vinnie Paul, Scott Ian, and Dusty Hill. Erna took second, losing to Scott Ian of Anthrax.

Erna returned to play in the 2013 World Series of Poker. "I'm making my comeback! I've studied the game. I'm getting the itch to play poker again", Erna said during an interview with Playbook.

=== 2010 Haiti earthquake ===
Godsmack, Creed, and Rage Against the Machine guitarist Tom Morello are some of the musicians who partnered with multimedia company DC3 Music Group to fundraise and pack an MD-80 airplane with supplies and medical personnel to help in the 2010 Haiti earthquake. According to a press release, the plane was scheduled to leave from Long Beach, California, on January 27, 2010, and bring 10,000 pounds of medical supplies, along with doctors and medical staff, to Port-au-Prince.

Erna said in a statement, "Since I can't be there to help in person, I want to make my contribution as a fellow human being to give what I can while I'm in the fortunate situation that I am to help those that are so unfortunate in this time of tragedy."

=== Hometown Sessions ===
Erna launched a bi-weekly web series on YouTube called Hometown Sessions. The talk show has Erna hosting celebrity guests. He explained about the contents of the show:

"Every Tuesday I will be bringing on celebrity guests, musician friends and talking all things music. You never know, you may even catch some unique live performances from time to time. Thursdays will be reserved for 'real talk' about 'real life,' as we invite some of the top experts in to talk about mental health, struggles with addiction, depression, bullying and so much more!"

== Personal life ==
Erna has a daughter, born in 2001. Erna is a longtime fan of the New England Patriots, having sung the national anthem prior to home games in Foxborough on numerous occasions. After having lived in Windham, New Hampshire, he moved to Fort Myers, Florida in 2021, moving his studio as well.

=== Religious views ===
Erna was a practicing Wiccan early in his career. His spirituality influences some of his songwriting to include the song "Spiral" from Godsmack's second album Awake and "Releasing the Demons" from their third album Faceless. He has stated publicly, however, that he "didn't want to be the poster boy for witchcraft." He has also said that he does not follow any specific religion; "I'm just a spiritual person; I believe in karma and things like that. But religion is an ugly word to me."

=== Car accident ===
On April 11, 2007, Erna was involved in a three-car chain-reaction accident in Methuen, Massachusetts, when his Hummer H3 and two others collided at an intersection. "He's deeply concerned for the girl who was hurt in this unfortunate accident", said Erna's manager Paul Geary, in reference to 25-year-old Chelmsford resident Lindsay Taylor. "Sully's thankful he got out with a split lip and some aches and pains, but he's traumatized about the girl", according to the April 17, 2007 edition of Boston Herald.

Taylor was sitting in the back seat of a dark blue Toyota Camry that was rear-ended by the H3 driven by Erna. The crash occurred on a dark night, around 7 p.m. on the ramp leading from I-93 south to Route 213.

Taylor suffered a severe, traumatic brain injury and was in a coma after the crash. She suffered lasting effects, and would later sue. A settlement was reached in 2010.

== Gear ==
Erna uses Yamaha Absolute Birch drums. He plays on a signature Sully Erna Les Paul Studio guitar.

== Discography ==
=== Meliah Rage ===
- 1992: Unfinished Business

=== Strip Mind ===
- 1993: What's in Your Mouth

=== Godsmack ===
- 1998: Godsmack
- 2000: Awake
- 2003: Faceless
- 2004: The Other Side
- 2006: IV
- 2007: Good Times, Bad Times... Ten Years of Godsmack
- 2010: The Oracle
- 2012: Live and Inspired
- 2014: 1000hp
- 2018: When Legends Rise
- 2023: Lighting Up the Sky

=== Solo ===
- 2010: Avalon
- 2012: Avalon Live
- 2016: Hometown Life

== Filmography ==
Film
Year	Film	Role
2001	We Sold Our Souls for Rock 'n Roll	Himself
2001	Godsmack Live	Himself
2002	Smack This!	Himself
2003	Pauly Shore Is Dead	Himself
2003	Headbangers Ball Sully Erna Episode	Himself
2003	MTV Cribs	Himself
2004	Changes	Himself
2006	Gene Simmons Family Jewels	Himself
2006	Get Thrashed	Himself
2007	Good Times, Bad Times... Ten Years of Godsmack	Himself
2007	Dirt	Mark
2009	2009 World Series of Poker	Himself
2011	Sully Erna Presents: The Journey to Avalon	Himself
2013	Army of the Damned	Bridge
2016	Bleed for This	Caesar's Blackjack Dealer
2017	Benzin	Hitchhiker
2018	The Manor	Brett Bayton
