= Tony Rombola =

American guitarist (born 1964)

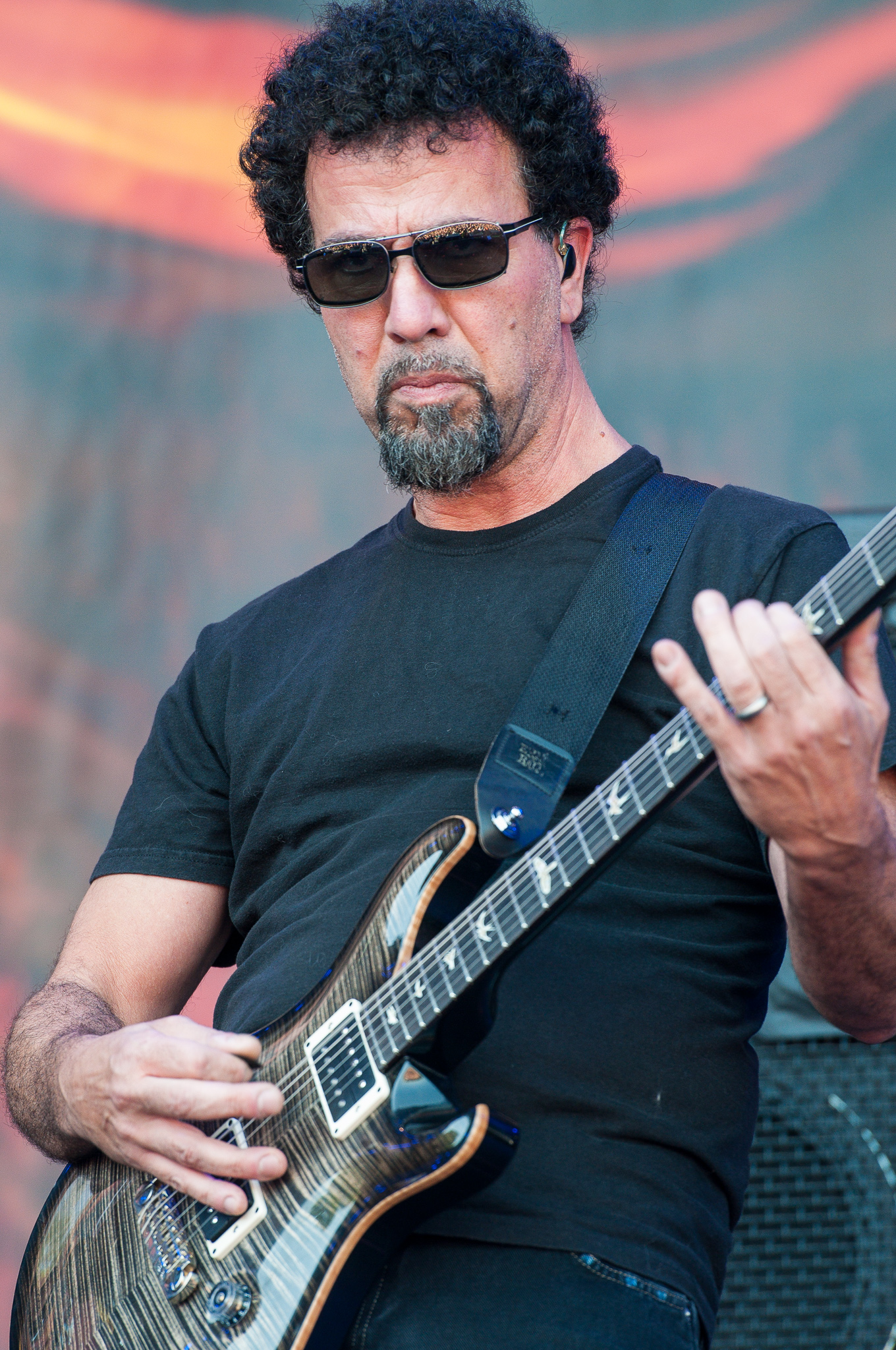
- Rombola performing with Godsmack in 2015

Background information
- Born: November 24, 1964 (age 61); Norwood, Massachusetts, U.S.
- Genres: Hard rock; post-grunge; heavy metal; alternative metal; nu metal; blues rock; psychedelic rock
- Occupation: Musician
- Instrument: Guitar
- Years active: 1995–present
- Member of: The Apocalypse Blues Revival
- Formerly of: Godsmack; Another Animal
- Website: godsmack.com

Tony Rombola (born November 24, 1964) is an American musician who was the lead guitarist for the Boston-based rock band Godsmack from the mid-1990s until April 2025. He has been cited as "an extraodinaire" in the guitar world by Guitar World magazine, and is cited to be the only guitarist to keep an "original soloing style" during the nu metal period, earning him the respect of the guitar industry. Rombola is also a guitarist for the side-project band Another Animal, formed at the beginning of 2007. The band released their self-titled debut album in October 2007.

== Biography ==
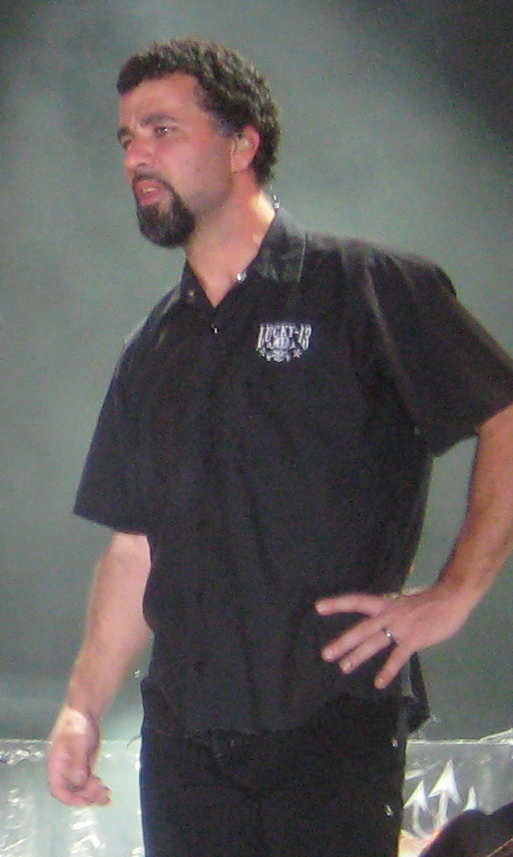
Rombola in 2007

Born in Norwood, Massachusetts, Rombola is a self-taught guitarist. He first picked up a guitar at age 11. According to his father, the first song Tony learned was a song by Black Sabbath. His first introductions to rock music were the albums Led Zeppelin III, 2112 and We Sold Our Soul for Rock 'n' Roll. Having never taken guitar lessons, Rombola learned everything he knows from guitar magazines such as Guitar World. His first guitar was an SG copy, before moving to custom Les Pauls and PRS guitars.

Before meeting up with Godsmack vocalist Sully Erna and bassist Robbie Merrill in the mid-'90s and subsequently joining Godsmack, Rombola played cover bands, funk, rock, classic rock, and metal. The two encountered Rombola performing in a local circuit with some band playing covers of Alice in Chains and Rage Against the Machine. Erna and Merrill knew they needed someone with Rombola's skill to reach the success that they have with Godsmack. They recorded an EP in 1997 which later became their self-titled debut album in 1998. This album went on to sell over 4 million copies in just a couple of years. The song "Keep Away" was inducted into the top 100 greatest rock songs, labelled under 'Guitar Legends'.

Rombola was a carpenter before he joined Godsmack, and has said that if not for the band, he would still be working as a carpenter. He has a wife, Sue, and three step children: Joe, Trisha, and AJ. He enjoys playing video games and golf as hobbies.

Rombola worked with Brian Coombes, of Tristan Park and David Pierog at Rocking Horse Studio, on the Prospect Hill Album which was released in November 2007. David and Tony are co-producing his first solo release with bassist Joe Pierog.

Godsmack drummer Shannon Larkin and Rombola have formed a blues rock band, The Apocalypse Blues Revival, along with singer Ray (Rafer John) Cerbone and bassist Brian Carpenter. Their second album, The Shape of Blues to Come, was released on July 2018.

His son Joe Fay died in October 2018 at the age of 34. No cause of death has been released.
