= Ugly Kid Joe discography =

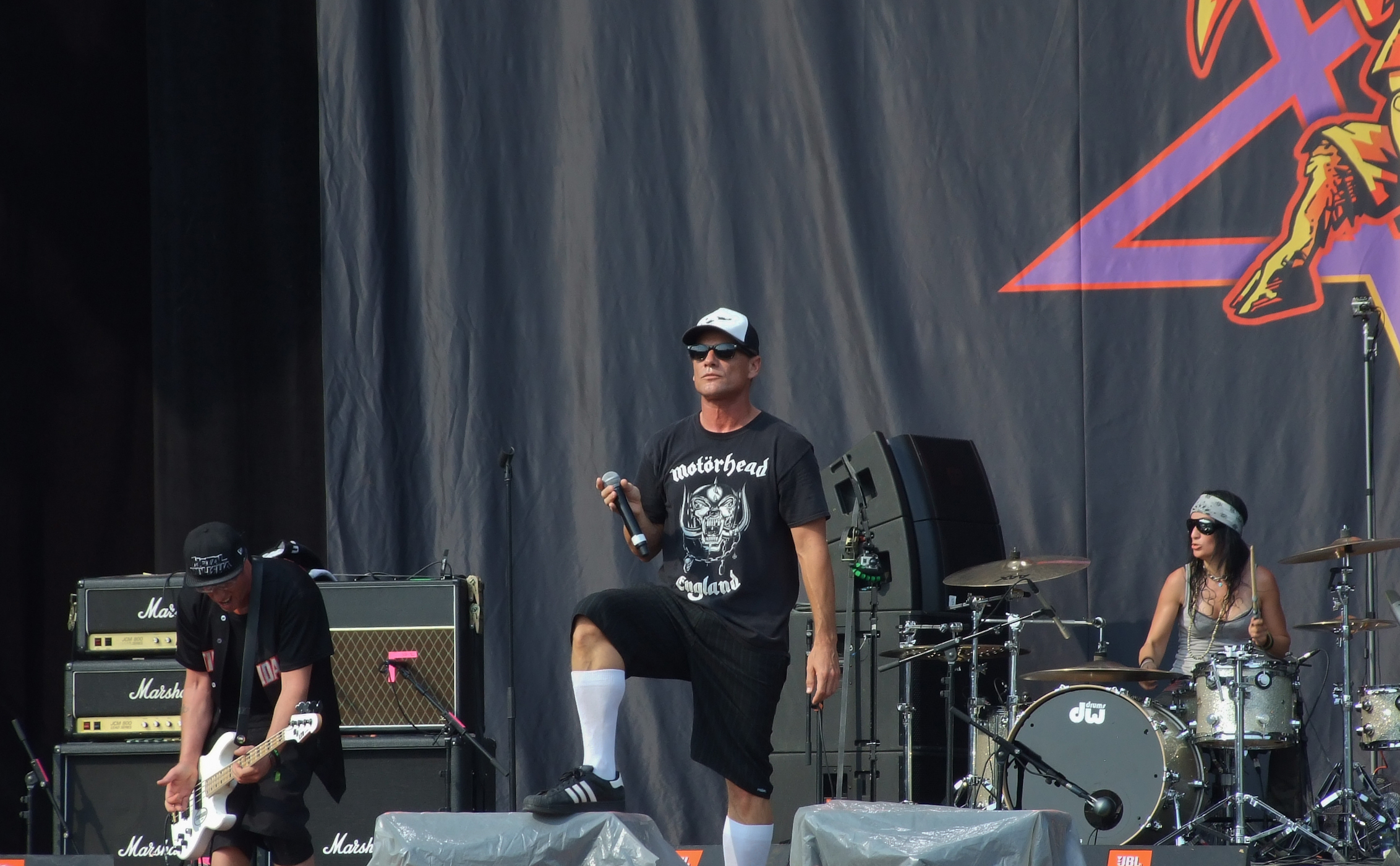
- Ugly Kid Joe in 2012
- Studio albums: 5
- EPs: 2
- Compilation albums: 2
- Singles: 17
- Music videos: 15

Ugly Kid Joe is an American rock band formed in Isla Vista, California, in 1989. Their original lineup consisted of Whitfield Crane on lead vocals, Klaus Eichstadt on lead guitar, Roger Lahr on rhythm guitar, Cordell Crockett on bass, and Mark Davis on drums. To date, their discography consists of five studio albums, two extended plays, two compilation albums, and sixteen singles.

== Albums ==
=== Studio albums ===
Year	Album details	Peak chart positions								Sales	Certifications (sales thresholds)
Year	Album details	US	AUS	AUT	NOR	NZ	SWE	SWI	UK	Sales	Certifications (sales thresholds)
1992	America's Least Wanted: Released: September 1992; Label: Mercury	27	7	4	8	13	21	16	11	US: 1,169,011	RIAA: 2× Platinum; ARIA: 2× Platinum; IFPI AUT: Gold; IFPI SWI: Gold
1995	Menace to Sobriety: Released: June 1995; Label: Mercury	178	19	24	—	—	—	22	25	US: 59,592	
1996	Motel California: Released: October 22, 1996; Label: Evilution/Castle	—	129	—	—	—	—	—	128	US: 13,310	
2015	Uglier Than They Used ta Be: Released: September 18, 2015 (PMU); Label: Metalville / UKJ	—	—	—	—	—	—	—	84		
2022	Rad Wings of Destiny: Released: October 21, 2022; Label: UKJ	—	—	—	—	—	—	39	—		
"—" denotes releases that did not chart.

=== Compilation albums ===
Year	Album details
1998	The Very Best of Ugly Kid Joe: Released: August 4, 1998; Label: Mercury
2002	The Collection: Released: May 14, 2002; Label: Spectrum Music

== Extended plays ==
Year	EP details	Peak chart positions						Certifications
Year	EP details	US	AUT	NOR	NZ	SWI	UK	Certifications
1991	As Ugly as They Wanna Be: Released: October 1991; Label: Mercury	4	15	13	12	20	9	RIAA: 2× Platinum
2012	Stairway to Hell: Released: June 5, 2012; Label: UKJ	—	—	—	—	—	—	

== Singles ==
Year	Single	Peak chart positions									Certifications	Album
Year	Single	US	US Main	US Pop	AUS	FRA	NOR	NZ	SWE	UK	Certifications	Album
1991	"Everything About You"	9	6	—	4	25	5	—	15	3	ARIA: Platinum	As Ugly as They Wanna Be
1991	"Madman"	—	—	—	—	—	—	—	—	—		As Ugly as They Wanna Be
1991	"Sweet Leaf/Funky Fresh Country Club"	—	—	—	—	—	—	—	—	—		As Ugly as They Wanna Be
1992	"Neighbor"	—	29	—	28	—	—	—	—	28		America's Least Wanted
1992	"So Damn Cool"	—	—	—	—	—	—	—	—	44		America's Least Wanted
1993	"Cats in the Cradle"	6	3	11	1	28	2	4	4	7	RIAA: Gold; ARIA: Platinum; BPI: Silver	America's Least Wanted
1993	"Busy Bee"	—	22	—	39	—	—	—	—	39		America's Least Wanted
1994	"Goddamn Devil"	—	—	—	—	—	—	—	—	—		America's Least Wanted
1994	"N.I.B."	—	—	—	—	—	—	—	—	—		Nativity in Black
1995	"Tomorrow's World"	—	—	—	—	—	—	—	—	—		Menace to Sobriety
1995	"Milkman's Son"	—	—	—	40	—	—	—	—	39		Menace to Sobriety
1995	"Cloudy Skies"	—	—	—	115	—	—	—	—	—		Menace to Sobriety
1996	"It's a Lie"	—	—	—	—	—	—	—	—	—		Motel California
1996	"Sandwich"	—	—	—	165	—	—	—	—	—		Motel California
2012	"Devil's Paradise"	—	—	—	—	—	—	—	—	—		Stairway to Hell (EP)
2022	"That Ain't Livin'"	—	—	—	—	—	—	—	—	—		Rad Wings of Destiny
2022	"Kill the Pain"	—	—	—	—	—	—	—	—	—		Rad Wings of Destiny
2022	"Long Road"	—	—	—	—	—	—	—	—	—		Rad Wings of Destiny
2022	"Failure"	—	—	—	—	—	—	—	—	—		Rad Wings of Destiny
2022	"Lola"	—	—	—	—	—	—	—	—	—		Rad Wings of Destiny
"—" denotes releases that did not chart

== Music videos ==
Year	Song	Album
1992	"Everything About You"	As Ugly As They Wanna Be
1992	"Madman"	As Ugly As They Wanna Be
1992	"Neighbor"	America's Least Wanted
1992	"So Damn Cool"	America's Least Wanted
1993	"Cat's in the Cradle"	America's Least Wanted
1993	"Busy Bee"	America's Least Wanted
1995	"Tomorrow's World"	Menace to Sobriety
1995	"Milkman's Son"	Menace to Sobriety
1995	"Cloudy Skies"	Menace to Sobriety
1996	"Sandwich"	Motel California
1996	"Bicycle wheels"	Motel California
2012	"Devil's Paradise"	Stairway to Hell
2012	"I'm Alright"	Stairway to Hell
2016	"Under the Bottom"	Uglier Than They Used ta Be
2022	"That Ain't Livin'"	Rad Wings of Destiny
2022	"Kill the Pain"	Rad Wings of Destiny
2022	"Long Road"	Rad Wings of Destiny
2022	"Failure"	Rad Wings of Destiny
2022	"Lola"	Rad Wings of Destiny
