= Cordell Crockett =

American bassist

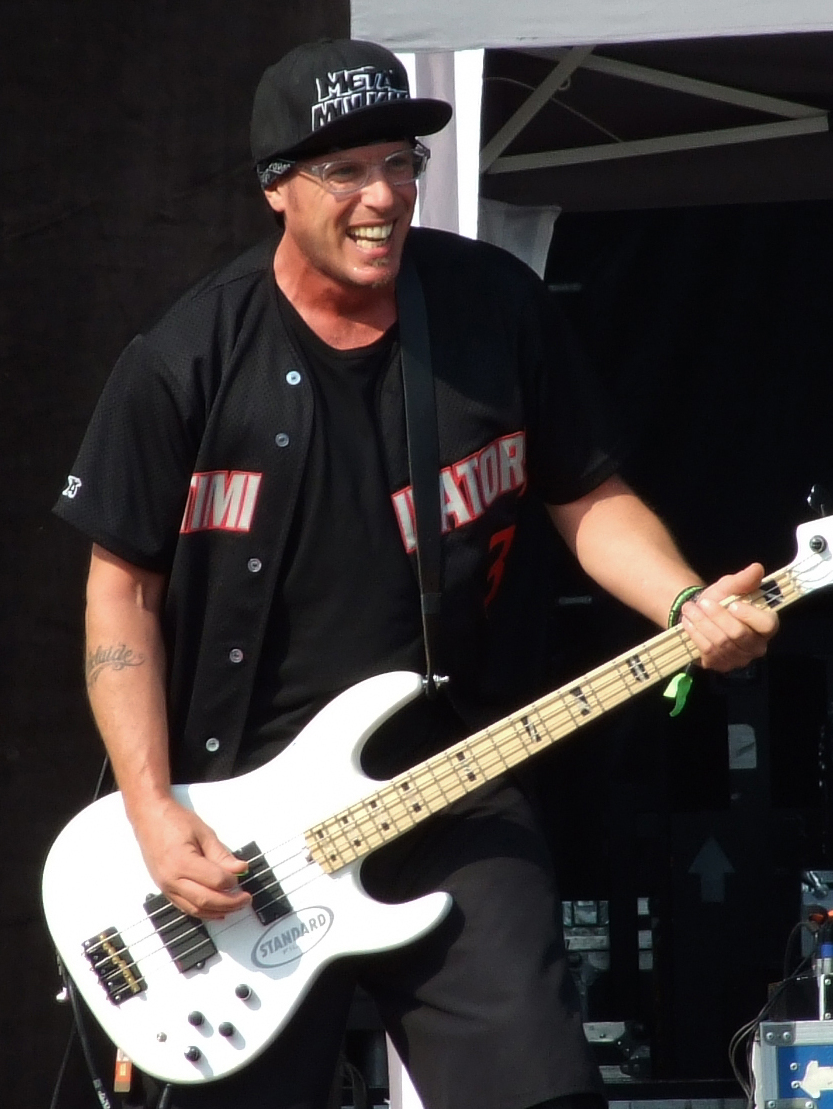
- Crocket with Ugly Kid Joe in 2012

Background information
- Born: January 21, 1965 (age 61); Alameda County, California, U.S.
- Genres: Hard rock, heavy metal
- Occupation: Bassist
- Years active: 1987–present
- Member of: Ugly Kid Joe
- Website: cordellcrockett.com

Cordell Crockett (born January 21, 1965) is an American rock musician known for playing bass guitar and singing backing vocals for Ugly Kid Joe from 1991 until they disbanded in 1997, and again since their reunion in 2010, appearing on the band's every studio album and two EP's to date.

== Early years and education ==
Born in Alameda County, California, the son of Jean Weston and Guitar Player magazine editor Jim Crockett, Cordell Crockett grew up in a musical household. His mother played piano and his father, as well as being in publishing was also a musician, playing with 1960s Civil Rights activists Mississippi Caravan of Music alongside singer Cordell Reagon of The Freedom Singers.

Crockett attended Salinas High School where he played both trombone and bass guitar in bands from the age of 12. By the age of 16 he had joined local rock bands playing clubs, weddings and high school dances.

Graduating in 1985 from the Musicians Institute in Los Angeles having studied three courses simultaneously in Guitar, Bass and Sound, Audio & Visual Engineering, Crockett joined DV8, the band of music producer Jay Baumgardner, who would later mix Ugly Kid Joe's debut record

== Career ==
Crockett's first experience of large scale touring was as a roadie for Love/Hate during their 1990 tour with AC/DC.

Then, through music manager Dennis Rider, Crockett was introduced to Whitfield Crane and Klaus Eichstadt. Childhood friends, Crane and Eichstadt had formed a band in Santa Barbara and following a number of early line-up changes. Crockett joined in April 1991 on bass, replacing its original bassist Phil Hilgaertner, with Dave Fortman joining on rhythm guitar a year later.

Ugly Kid Joe signed to Stardog/Mercury Records in 1991 and released As Ugly As They Wanna Be -notable for being the first EP to receive RIAA multi-platinum status.

Achieving commercial success with the hit single "Everything About You" which then featured in the film Wayne's World the band returned to the studio to record America's Least Wanted, produced by Mark Dodson. The album reached multi-platinum status and featured the single "Cats in the Cradle" (originally sung by Harry Chapin).

The subsequent years saw the band touring stadiums with Ozzy Osbourne, Def Leppard, Bon Jovi and Van Halen and headlining smaller venues across Europe, Australia and Japan.

In 1994 Shannon Larkin joined the band on drums replacing Mark Davis and they went on to release Menace to Sobriety in 1995 and Motel California in 1996 before disbanding in 1997.

During the hiatus, Crockett played with Atomship, Love/Hate, Budderside, Abercrombie, Jon E. Love & The Haters, Hear Kitty Kitty and briefly with Steven Adler in his band Road Crew.

Playing lead guitar and singing backing vocals with Hear Kitty Kitty, Crockett took a more hands-on role including on the video and sound engineering side of production as well as song writing and tour management. 'Tails From The Alley' was their first [self-released] album in 2009 and saw the band play regularly at Hollywood venues such as The Whiskey-a-Go-Go, touring across America in a run of 17 shows and later playing Download Festival in 2013.

In 2010, rumours of an Ugly Kid Joe reunion were confirmed and the band reformed with Crockett resuming bass and backing vocals, releasing another EP Stairway to Hell in 2012 and two more studio albums—Uglier Than They Used ta Be and Rad Wings of Destiny in 2015 and 2022, respectively.

Crockett was again playing stadiums and arenas across the world as the band toured with bands of different rock genres Guns N' Roses, Alice Cooper, Faith No More, Judas Priest and Skid Row as well as headlining smaller venues across Europe. One of the largest shows in the band's history was playing Polish Woodstock in 2013 to a crowd of 500,000 people.

A staple on the European festival circuit has seen the band often appearing in the line-up for Download (UK) Hellfest (France), Graspop (Belgium), Copenhell (Denmark), Wacken (Germany) and Gods of Metal (Italy).

Crockett spends his spare time as a session musician as well as writing and recording with local musicians in Los Angeles.

== Style and equipment ==
When playing bass, Crockett wears his guitar low-slung and uses a wide range of different bass techniques including slapping, popping, finger picking, and plectrums. He also uses a bass guitar wah-wah pedal quite frequently, particularly in the Ugly Kid Joe songs "Same Side", "Sandwich", and "Funky Fresh Country Club".

== Influences ==
Crockett cites his earliest influences as The Ohio Players, Earth Wind and Fire and Peter Frampton.

He regularly attended music festivals with his father as a child and through his father had the opportunity to play with legends such as B.B King.

His main influence is Black Sabbath bassist Geezer Butler. Ugly Kid Joe has covered many Black Sabbath songs, including "Sweet Leaf" and "N.I.B."

Other influences include Lemmy, Steve Harris, Eddie Van Halen and AC/DC.

== Select discography ==
EPs, albums & collections

- Ugly Kid Joe – As Ugly as They Wanna Be – Mercury – 1991
- Ugly Kid Joe – America's Least Wanted – Mercury – 1992
- Ugly Kid Joe – Menace to Sobriety – Mercury – 1995
- Ugly Kid Joe – Motel California – Evilution/Castle – 1996
- Ugly Kid Joe – The Very Best of Ugly Kid Joe – Mercury – 1998
- Ugly Kid Joe – The Collection – Spectrum Music – 2002
- Atomship – Crash or '47 – Wind Up – 2004
- Hear Kitty Kitty – Tails From The Alley – Self-Released – 2009
- Ugly Kid Joe – Stairway to Hell – UKJ Records – 2012
- Ugly Kid Joe – Uglier Than They Used ta Be – Metalville/UKJ Records – 2015
- Ugly Kid Joe – Official Bootleg – UKJ Records – 2016
- Ugly Kid Joe – Rad Wings of Destiny – UKJ Records – 2022
