= Another Animal (album) =

Studio album by Another Animal
- Released: October 2, 2007
- Recorded: Mad Oak Studios, Boston, Massachusetts
- Genre: Post-grunge; hard rock; alternative metal
- Length: 43:28
- Label: Universal Republic
- Producer: Another Animal

Singles from Another Animal
- 1. "Broken Again" Released: 2007; 2. "Fade Away" Released: 2008

Professional ratings
Review scores
Source	Rating
AllMusic	2.5/5 stars

Another Animal is the only studio album by the rock supergroup Another Animal. It was released on October 2, 2007. The song "Amends" appeared in the closing credits for the 2008 zombie horror film Insanitarium.

== History ==
During the writing of IV by Godsmack, lead singer Sully Erna encountered writer's block; so guitarist Tony Rombola, drummer Shannon Larkin, and bassist Robbie Merrill went to the studio and recorded music. After writing almost 40 songs, only 14 were used. The left-over songs were then recycled by the members after they recruited Whitfield Crane of Ugly Kid Joe as well as Lee Richards, Godsmack's first guitarist, and Another Animal was born.

== Sound ==
The music of the album sounds similar to IV, but the vocals are distinct. The album features strong bass-lines and hard-hitting drums; it is predominantly heavier than IV, but includes a few softer songs, including "Fade Away" and "Interlude", which features acoustic guitars and a country sound.

== Track listing ==
All songs written by Another Animal, except where noted.

No.	Title	Writer(s)	Length
1.	"Find a Way"	Another Animal; John Kosco	4:02
2.	"Distant Signs"		4:05
3.	"Broken Again"		5:22
4.	"Before the Fall"		2:59
5.	"Amends"		3:51
6.	"Interlude"		1:17
7.	"Left Behind"		4:06
8.	"Blind"		3:20
9.	"The Beast Within"		3:20
10.	"The Thin Line"		2:17
11.	"Black Coffee Blues"		4:11
12.	"Fade Away"		4:33
Total length:			43:28

iTunes exclusive bonus track
No.	Title	Length
13.	"Save Me"	4:45

== Singles ==
- "Broken Again" (2007)
- "Fade Away" (2008)

== Personnel ==
Band

- Whitfield Crane – lead vocals
- Tony Rombola – lead guitar, backing vocals
- Robbie Merrill – bass guitar
- Shannon Larkin – drums, lead vocals on "The Thin Line"
- Lee Richards – rhythm guitar, lead vocals on "The Beast Within", "Black Coffee Blues" and "Save Me", backing vocals

Other

- Dave Fortman – mixing
- Ted Jensen – mastering
- Storm Thorgerson – artwork
- Wesley Fontenot – mixing assistant

== Release history ==
Country	Date
United States	October 2, 2007
Canada	October 3, 2007
United Kingdom	October 4, 2007
Japan	October 7, 2007
Germany	October 12, 2007
