= Crazy Enough =

Crazy Enough may refer to:

- Crazy Enough (Storm Large album), 2009
- Crazy Enough (Bobby Wills album), 2014, or the song of the same name
- "Crazy Enough" (song), a 2018 song by Joe Bermudez
- "Crazy Enough", a song by Julie Bergan
