= America's Least Wanted =

Studio album by Ugly Kid Joe
- Released: September 8, 1992
- Recorded: 1991–1992
- Studios: Devonshire Studios, North Hollywood, California
- Genres: Hard rock; heavy metal; pop metal
- Length: 59:08
- Label: Mercury
- Producers: Ugly Kid Joe; Mark Dodson; Michael Dodson; Ryan Dorn

Ugly Kid Joe chronology
As Ugly as They Wanna Be (1991)	America's Least Wanted (1992)	Menace to Sobriety (1995)

Alternative cover
- Censored edition

Singles from America's Least Wanted
- 1. "Everything About You" Released: March 19, 1992; 2. "Madman" Released: 1992; 3. "Neighbor" Released: August 1992; 4. "So Damn Cool" Released: October 1992; 5. "Cats in the Cradle" Released: March 25, 1993; 6. "Busy Bee" Released: June 1993; 7. "Goddamn Devil" Released: 1993

America's Least Wanted is the debut studio album by American rock band Ugly Kid Joe, released in September 1992. The title is a parody of the famous phrase "America's Most Wanted". It is the band's only album to feature drummer Mark Davis.

The album was a commercial success, charting three singles on the Mainstream Rock Tracks ("Neighbor", "Busy Bee" and "Cats in the Cradle"). "Everything About You" peaked at No. 3 in the UK Singles Chart and at No. 9 in the Billboard Hot 100. "Cats in the Cradle" (a 1974 folk rock song by Harry Chapin), also made the Billboard Hot 100, peaking at number six, earning the album two top 10 Billboard hit singles. The latter song also made it to No. 11 on the Top 40 Mainstream. As of 1995, the album has been certified double platinum in both the United States and Australia.

== Album information ==
Two of the songs had previously been included on the band's 1991 debut EP As Ugly as They Wanna Be though some small changes were made for this album: "Madman" was given a new vocal track while "Everything About You" was given a spoken intro by actress and then Saturday Night Live cast member Julia Sweeney as her questionably gendered character, Pat. The rhythm guitar parts of both songs originally played by Roger Lahr on the debut EP were replaced by those of Dave Fortman—Lahr was present at the time of the album's recording process and left the band halfway through. However, he is credited in the song "Come Tomorrow" and is included in the album's liner notes, as the band thanked him for spending his time with them. "Everything About You" had previously been included in the SNL-based movie Wayne's World, which was released seven months before. Pat also appeared in the video for "Neighbor."

The difference between CD and LP versions of this album is that the song "Goddamn Devil" appears as its first track on the B-side.

== Artwork ==
The album's original artwork depicts Ugly Kid Joe's mascot as the Statue of Liberty gesturing an upraised middle finger in place of the statue's torch and a pornographic magazine in place of the tabula ansata. Several national chains refused to sell the album in their stores due to this, and a "censored" version was manufactured for some retailers. The censored version depicts the Ugly Kid Joe mascot gagged, handcuffed in one hand (which is covered with duct tape) and tied in rope, while his legs are restrained with a ball and chain. This image was originally used for the back cover of the album. The album's artwork, as well as all other promotional work and the As Ugly as They Wanna Be and The Very Best of Ugly Kid Joe: As Ugly as It Gets covers, was done by Whitfield Crane's high school friend Moish Brennan.

== Reception ==
Professional ratings
Review scores
Source	Rating
AllMusic	4.5/5 stars
Calgary Herald	B
Entertainment Weekly	C−
Los Angeles Times	1.5/4 stars
Q	3/5 stars

Despite being Ugly Kid Joe's most successful album, America's Least Wanted received mostly mixed reviews. The album received a positive review from AllMusic's Stephen Thomas Erlewine, who said that it "delivers a set of similar rockers and a handful of power ballads, including a revamped version of Harry Chapin's 'Cat's in the Cradle'" and described the music as a "mixture of fizzy, fuzzy riffs, sing-song melodies, and calculated obnoxiousness [that] isn't that offensive."

Deborah Frost of Entertainment Weekly, however, gave the album a C− and called it "a weak attempt to pad Ugly out to LP length with Lynyrd Skynyrd licks, Mister Rogers jokes, a scarily straight Harry Chapin cover ('Cat's in the Cradle'), and 'Mr. Recordman,' the most pathetic love song to a record company ever written. These kids should have quit while they were ahead."

Steve Hochman of Los Angeles Times gave it one-and-a-half stars out of four and called Ugly Kid Joe "generic MTV-rad-party dudes in baggies and Ts who seem to know how certain kinds of rock are supposed to sound but have no clue as to why. [...] The would-be centerpiece, 'Goddamn Devil,' has neither the irony nor the evil needed to revive that tired topic, despite a guest appearance by Judas Priest's knowing Rob Halford. Turning Harry Chapin's 'Cat's in the Cradle' into a power ballad was a bad idea to begin with; making it sound neither snotty nor particularly sincere only compounds the error. [...] America's least wanted? Probably not. Least interesting? Now you're on target."

== In popular culture ==
The music video for the track "Neighbor" was featured in the Beavis and Butt-Head episode "Scratch 'n' Win" while the cover appeared as a poster in the Seinfeld episode "The Bubble Boy".

== Track listing ==
All songs credited to Whitfield Crane, Cordell Crockett, Mark Davis, Klaus Eichstadt and Dave Fortman. Actual writers listed below.

1. "Neighbor" (Crane, Eichstadt) – 4:45
2. "Goddamn Devil" (Eichstadt) – 4:55
3. "Come Tomorrow" (Crane, Crockett, Eichstadt, Roger Lahr) – 4:55
4. "Panhandlin' Prince" (Crane, Eichstadt) – 5:42
5. "Busy Bee" (Fortman) – 4:10
6. "Don't Go" (Crane, Eric Phillips) – 4:33
7. "So Damn Cool" (Crane, Eichstadt) – 4:26
8. "Same Side" (Crane, Crockett, Eichstadt) – 4:51
9. "Cats in the Cradle" (Harry Chapin, Sandra Chapin) – 4:02
10. "I'll Keep Tryin'" (Eichstadt, Alan Reed) – 4:59
11. "Everything About You" (Crane, Eichstadt)– 4:20
12. "Madman" ('92 Remix) (Eichstadt)– 3:37
13. "Mr. Recordman" (Eichstadt) – 4:06

On the cassette pressings the track listing is:

Side one:

1. "Neighbor" (Crane, Eichstadt) – 4:43
2. "Come Tomorrow" (Crane, Crockett, Eichstadt, Roger Lahr) – 4:54
3. "Panhandlin' Prince" (Crane, Eichstadt) – 5:41
4. "Busy Bee" (Fortman) – 4:08
5. "Don't Go" (Crane, Eric Phillips) – 4:30
6. "So Damn Cool" (Crane, Eichstadt) – 4:24

Side two:

1. "Goddamn Devil" (Eichstadt) – 4:53
2. "Same Side" (Crane, Crockett, Eichstadt) – 4:48
3. "Cats in the Cradle" (Harry Chapin, Sandra Chapin) – 4:01
4. "I'll Keep Tryin'" (Eichstadt, Alan Reed) – 4:58
5. "Everything About You" (Crane, Eichstadt)– 4:20
6. "Madman" ('92 Remix) (Eichstadt)– 3:37
7. "Mr. Recordman" (Eichstadt) – 4:11

== Personnel ==
- Whitfield Crane - vocals
- Cordell Crockett - bass, vocals, background vocals
- Klaus Eichstadt - guitar, vocals, background vocals, lead vocals on "Mr. Recordman"
- Dave Fortman - guitar, vocals, background vocals
- Mark Davis - percussion, drums

=== Additional personnel ===
- Jennifer Barry - background vocals
- Rob Halford - background vocals on "Goddamn Devil"
- Carrie Hamilton - piano on "Everything About You"
- Stephen Perkins - percussion
- Dean Pleasants - rhythm guitar on "Same Side"
- Julia Sweeney - spoken words on "Goddamn Devil" and "Everything About You"
- Jay Baumgardner - remixing
- Greg Calbi - mastering
- Mark Dodson - producer, engineer
- Michael Dodson - producer, engineer, mixing
- Ryan Dorn - producer
- Michael Levine - photography
- Randy Long - engineer, mixing
- Ugly Kid Joe - producer, remixing

== Charts ==
=== Weekly charts ===
Chart (1992–93)	Peak position
Australian Albums (ARIA)	7
Austrian Albums (Ö3 Austria)	4
Dutch Albums (Album Top 100)	31
German Albums (Offizielle Top 100)	10
Hungarian Albums (MAHASZ)	31
New Zealand Albums (RMNZ)	13
Norwegian Albums (VG-lista)	8
Swedish Albums (Sverigetopplistan)	21
Swiss Albums (Schweizer Hitparade)	16
UK Albums (Official Charts)	11
US Billboard 200	27

=== Year-end charts ===
Chart (1993)	Position
Australian Albums (ARIA)	14
Austrian Albums (Ö3 Austria)	30
German Albums (Offizielle Top 100)	44
US Billboard 200	88

== Certifications ==
Region	Certification	Certified units/sales
Australia (ARIA)	2× Platinum	140,000^{^}
Austria (IFPI Austria)	Gold	25,000^{*}
Canada (Music Canada)	Platinum	100,000^{^}
Switzerland (IFPI Switzerland)	Gold	25,000^{^}
United States (RIAA)	2× Platinum	2,000,000^{^}
^{*} Sales figures based on certification alone.^{^} Shipments figures based on certification alone.
