= As Ugly as They Wanna Be =

EP by Ugly Kid Joe
- Released: October 8, 1991
- Recorded: 1991
- Studios: NRG, North Hollywood
- Genres: Hard rock; funk metal
- Length: 24:56
- Label: Stardog
- Producers: Ugly Kid Joe, Ryan Dorn

Ugly Kid Joe chronology
As Ugly as They Wanna Be (1991)	America's Least Wanted (1992)

Professional ratings
Review scores
Source	Rating
AllMusic	3/5 stars
Calgary Herald	B
Chicago Tribune	1/4 stars
Entertainment Weekly	B

As Ugly as They Wanna Be is an EP by the American rock band Ugly Kid Joe, released on October 8, 1991. The title is a parody of 2 Live Crew's 1989 album As Nasty as They Wanna Be.

As Ugly as They Wanna Be is notable for being the first EP to be certified multi-platinum by the RIAA. It is the only Ugly Kid Joe record to feature Roger Lahr on rhythm guitar and the only EP to feature Mark Davis on drums, though the latter would go on to play Ugly Kid Joe's debut album America's Least Wanted (1992) as his only album contribution with the band.

== Overview ==
Two tracks—"Madman" and "Everything About You"—later appeared on the band's 1992 debut album America's Least Wanted with only little changes (new vocal track on "Madman" and spoken intro on "Everything About You"). Rhythm guitar parts on both songs that were originally played by Roger Lahr were replaced by those of Lahr's successor Dave Fortman's for the album. "Everything About You" later became a hit single and was used in the movie Wayne's World, which was released the following year.

The track "Sweet Leaf" is a cover of British heavy metal band Black Sabbath.

== Track listing ==
1. "Madman" (Klaus Eichstadt) – 3:37
2. "Whiplash Liquor" (Eichstadt, Roger Lahr, Whitfield Crane) – 3:40
3. "Too Bad" (Crane, Eric Phillips) – 5:54
4. "Everything About You" (Eichstadt, Crane) – 4:14
5. "Sweet Leaf"/"Funky Fresh Country Club" (Crane, Phillips, Bill Ward, Geezer Butler, Ozzy Osbourne, Tommy Iommi) – 7:31
6. "Heavy Metal" – 0:25

== Personnel ==
- Whitfield Crane – vocals
- Cordell Crockett – bass, backing vocals
- Klaus Eichstadt – guitars, backing vocals
- Roger Lahr – guitars, backing vocals
- Mark Davis – percussion, drums

== Charts ==
=== Weekly charts ===
Chart (1992)	Peak position
Austrian Albums (Ö3 Austria)	15
Dutch Albums (Album Top 100)	57
German Albums (Offizielle Top 100)	24
New Zealand Albums (RMNZ)	12
Norwegian Albums (VG-lista)	13
Swiss Albums (Schweizer Hitparade)	20
UK Albums (Official Charts)	9
US Billboard 200	4

=== Year-end charts ===
Chart (1992)	Position
German Albums (Offizielle Top 100)	84
US Billboard 200	52

=== Singles ===
Year	Single	Chart	Position
1992	"Everything About You"	Mainstream Rock Tracks	6
1992	"Everything About You"	Billboard Hot 100	9

== Certifications ==
Region	Certification	Certified units/sales
Canada (Music Canada)	Platinum	100,000^{^}
United States (RIAA)	2× Platinum	2,000,000^{^}
^{^} Shipments figures based on certification alone.
