= Broken Again =

Single by Another Animal

from the album Another Animal
- Released: 2007
- Recorded: 2007
- Genre: Hard rock
- Length: 5:23
- Label: Universal/Republic
- Songwriter(s): Whitfield Crane; Lee Richards; Tony Rombola

Another Animal singles chronology
"Broken Again" (2007)	"Fade Away" (2008)

"Broken Again" is a song by American rock band Another Animal and the lead single from their self-titled album.

== Chart positions ==
=== Singles ===
Billboard (North America)

Year	Chart	Position
2007	Mainstream Rock Tracks	8
