= The Crash of '47 =

Studio album by Atomship
- Released: May 4, 2004
- Recorded: 2004
- Genre: Alternative metal; post-grunge; nu metal; progressive metal
- Length: 50:17
- Label: Wind-up
- Producer: Dave Fortman

Singles from The Crash of '47
- 1. "Pencil Fight" Released: 2004; 2. "Withered" Released: October 12, 2004

Professional ratings
Review scores
Source	Rating
AllMusic	3.5/5 stars
Sputnikmusic	4/5 stars

The Crash of '47 is the only studio album by the American alternative metal band Atomship. It was released on May 4, 2004, and was produced by Dave Fortman (Evanescence, Superjoint Ritual). The song "Time for People" was released on the Wind-up soundtrack for the movie The Punisher. Two singles were released from The Crash of '47: "Pencil Fight" and "Withered".

== Atomship ==
Atomship started out as Watership Down, containing Nathan Slade and Chad Kent, both of whom played on The Crash of '47, and Derek Pardoe, who only wrote songs for the album. After the name change to Atomship, Joey Culver subbed as the lead vocalist, while Pardoe had personal troubles while he dealt with anxiety problems and as a result was unable to participate. The bass was played by Slade on 5 tracks, and Cordell Crockett (bassist of Ugly Kid Joe) played on the rest.

== Track listing ==
All tracks are written by Chad Kent, Derek Pardoe and Nathan Slade, except where noted.

No.	Title	Writer(s)	Length
1.	"Day of Daze"		3:03
2.	"Mothra"		5:26
3.	"Dragonfly"		4:24
4.	"Pencil Fight"		3:35
5.	"Withered"		4:04
6.	"Agent Orange"		6:47
7.	"Time for People"		3:51
8.	"Aliens"		4:22
9.	"Whitfield"		4:55
10.	"Friends"		4:04
11.	"Plastic People"	Pardoe; Kent; Slade; Joey Culver	5:46
Total length:			50:17

B-sides
No.	Title	Writer(s)	Length
12.	"Never Coming Down"		3:27
13.	"Changes"		4:09
14.	"Break Away"		3:55
15.	"Outside"		3:30
16.	"Crawling"		5:12
17.	"Save Me"		3:46
18.	"Burn It Away"		4:32
19.	"Falling Apart"		4:45
20.	"Can't Believe"		4:14
21.	"These Things"		5:39
22.	"So Far Away"		4:57
23.	"Falling to Pieces"		3:59
24.	"Time for People (Live)"		4:17
25.	"Day of Daze (Live)"		3:48
26.	"Dragonfly (Live)"		4:52
27.	"Withered (Live)"		4:11
28.	"Friends (Live)"		4:38
29.	"Pencil Fight (Live)"		4:13
30.	"Mothra (Acoustic Version)"		4:09
31.	"Plastic People (Acoustic Version)"	Pardoe; Kent; Slade; Joey Culver	4:42

== Personnel ==
- Cordell Crockett – bass (tracks 1, 3 to 5, 9, 10)
- Nathan Slade – bass, guitar (tracks 2, 6 to 8, 11)
- Chad Kent – drums
- Joey Culver – vocals
- Greg Leisz – pedal-steel guitar on track 5
