= Another Animal =

American rock band

Background information
- Genres: Hard rock, post-grunge, alternative metal
- Years active: 2006–2008, 2011
- Labels: Universal, Republic
- Spinoff of: Godsmack
- Members: Whitfield Crane; Tony Rombola; Shannon Larkin; Robbie Merrill; Lee Richards
- Website: Another Animal on Facebook

Another Animal was an American rock supergroup formed by members of Godsmack, Ugly Kid Joe and Dropbox.

== History ==
During the writing sessions of IV by Godsmack, lead singer Sully Erna encountered writer's block so Tony Rombola, Shannon Larkin and Robbie Merrill went to the studio and recorded music. After writing almost 40 songs, only 14 were used (two being bonus songs). The leftover songs were then recycled by the members after they recruited Whitfield Crane of Ugly Kid Joe and Another Animal was born. Soon joining the band was friend and former Godsmack and Dropbox guitarist Lee Richards.

The band released its self-titled debut album in 2007. The first single, "Broken Again", reached No. 8 on the U.S. Billboard Hot Mainstream Rock Tracks chart. To support the album, the band opened for Alter Bridge on tour in late 2007. Another Animal later released a single titled "Fall of Rome", produced by Dave Fortman. Drummer Shannon Larkin mentioned that if the single is a success they will make a new album, a follow-up to their self-titled debut of 2007, saying "If the song does well enough at radio, we will tour in the fall and make a new record as well." Obviously the band had not reached its goal.

Another Animal was part of the stable of artists who recorded at Rocking Horse Studio in Pittsfield, New Hampshire.

== Members ==
- Whitfield Crane – lead vocals (Ugly Kid Joe, Medication)
- Tony Rombola – lead guitar, backing vocals (Godsmack)
- Robbie Merrill – bass guitar (Godsmack)
- Shannon Larkin – drums, backing vocals (Godsmack, Ugly Kid Joe)
- Lee Richards – rhythm guitar, backing vocals (Dropbox, ex-Godsmack)

== Discography ==
=== Studio albums ===
- Another Animal (2007)

=== Singles ===
Year	Song	US Main	Album
2007	"Broken Again"	8	Another Animal
2008	"Fade Away"	—	Another Animal
2011	"Fall of Rome"	39	Non-album single
