= The Very Best of Ugly Kid Joe: As Ugly as It Gets =

As Ugly as It Gets: The Very Best of Ugly Kid Joe

Compilation album by Ugly Kid Joe
- Released: 1998
- Genre: Hard rock, heavy metal, funk metal
- Length: 65:03
- Label: Mercury

Ugly Kid Joe chronology
Motel California (1996)	As Ugly as It Gets: The Very Best of Ugly Kid Joe (1998)	The Collection (2002)

Professional ratings
Review scores
Source	Rating
AllMusic	4.5/5 stars

As Ugly as It Gets: The Very Best of Ugly Kid Joe is a 1998 compilation album by American rock band Ugly Kid Joe. It includes select songs from the band's first two releases as well as a cover of the Black Sabbath song "N.I.B." (previously included on the tribute album Nativity in Black). Although this compilation was released after Motel California, it contains none of the singles from that album as Ugly Kid Joe had switched record labels by that time.

== Track listing ==
1. "Madman" – 3:37
2. "Neighbor" – 4:43
3. "Cat's in the Cradle" – 4:01
4. "Everything About You" – 4:20
5. "Tomorrow's World" – 4:18
6. "God" – 2:54
7. "Busy Bee" – 4:08
8. "C.U.S.T." – 2:59
9. "Milkman's Son" – 3:51
10. "N.I.B." – 5:24
11. "Goddamn Devil" – 4:53
12. "Slower Than Nowhere" – 4:58
13. "Funky Fresh Country Club" – 5:16
14. "Panhandlin' Prince" – 5:43
15. "Jesus Rode A Harley" – 3:15
