= Pencil Fight =

Single by Atomship

from the album The Crash of '47
- Released: 2004
- Recorded: 2004
- Length: 3:36
- Label: Wind-up
- Songwriter: Derek Pardoe
- Producer: Dave Fortman

"Pencil Fight" is a song by the American rock band Atomship released in 2004 from their only studio album The Crash of '47. It was written by lead singer Derek Pardoe. A video for the song was recorded in late 2004, just before the disbanding of Atomship, while the song had decent airplay on rock radio across the country. It was also featured on the soundtrack of NASCAR 2005: Chase for the Cup.

== Track listing ==
1. Pencil Fight - 3:36

== Chart positions ==
Chart	Position
Billboard Mainstream Rock Tracks	38
