= Sugartooth (album) =

Studio album by Sugartooth
- Released: April 12, 1994
- Genre: Alternative rock, grunge
- Length: 56:09
- Label: DGC
- Producer: Sugartooth

Sugartooth chronology
| Sugartooth (1994) | The Sounds of Solid (1996) |

Sugartooth is the first album by alternative rock band Sugartooth. It was released on 12 April 1994. The song Sold My Fortune became a minor hit having aired on an episode of Beavis and Butt-head. This album features drummer Joey Castillo, later of Danzig and Queens Of The Stone Age.

== Track listing ==
1. Sold My Fortune
2. Barrel
3. Cracks in the Pavement
4. Tuesday Morning
5. In Need
6. Leave My Soul to Rest
7. Third-Day-to-Forever
8. Black Queen
9. Between the Illness
10. Shine Boy
11. Sheffield Milestone
12. Gather Me/Ode
13. Sound of Her Laughter

== Personnel ==
- Marc Hutner - vocals, guitar
- Timothy Michael Gruse - guitar
- Joey Castillo - drums
- Josh Blum - bass

== Sources ==
- https://www.amazon.co.uk/Sugartooth/dp/B000003TAV/ref=sr_1_5?ie=UTF8&s=music&qid=1221848377&sr=8-5
