= Stairway to Hell =

EP by Ugly Kid Joe
- Released: June 5, 2012
- Recorded: 2011–2012
- Genre: Hard rock, alternative rock
- Length: 21:43
- Label: UKJ Records

Ugly Kid Joe chronology
The Collection (2002)	Stairway to Hell (2012)	Uglier Than They Used ta Be (2015)

Singles from Stairway to Hell
- 1. "Devil's Paradise" Released: May 24, 2012

Stairway to Hell is an EP by the American alternative rock band Ugly Kid Joe. It was released digitally on June 5, 2012, and physical version surfaced a month later, July 9. This is their first studio recording since 1996's Motel California, and their first EP since 1991's As Ugly as They Wanna Be. A video for its single "Devil's Paradise" was released on May 24, 2012 to promote it. Five days later, the EP was available for streaming in its entirety. Another music video for the "I'm Alright" song was released on November 12, 2012. The title is a portmanteau of Led Zeppelin's "Stairway to Heaven" and AC/DC's Highway to Hell, with the packaging using both bands' iconic typefaces.

On April 14, 2013 the EP was reissued with three acoustic bonus tracks and a DVD containing the complete Download Festival set from 2012.

Stairway to Hell is the first EP to feature Dave Fortman on rhythm guitar and Shannon Larkin on drums who both joined Ugly Kid Joe in 1992 and 1994 respectively.

== Tracks ==
1. "Devil's Paradise" (3:37)
2. "You Make Me Sick" (3:42)
3. "No One Survives" (4:02)
4. "I'm Alright" (3:21)
5. "Love Ain't True!" (featuring Angelo Moore and Dirty Walt of Fishbone) (3:28)
6. "Another Beer" (3:33)

Bonus track:

1. "Cat's In The Cradle" (2013 re-issue bonus acoustic track) (4:10)
2. "Would You Like To Be There" (2013 re-issue bonus acoustic track) (3:15)
3. "No One Survives" (2013 re-issue bonus acoustic track) (3:46)

=== DVD ===
1. Neighbor (6:23)
2. Panhandlin' Prince (5:35)
3. Milkman's Son (4:02)
4. Cat's In The Cradle (4:50)
5. Goddamn Devil (4:06)
6. Everything About You (4:17)
