= Atomship =

American alternative metal band

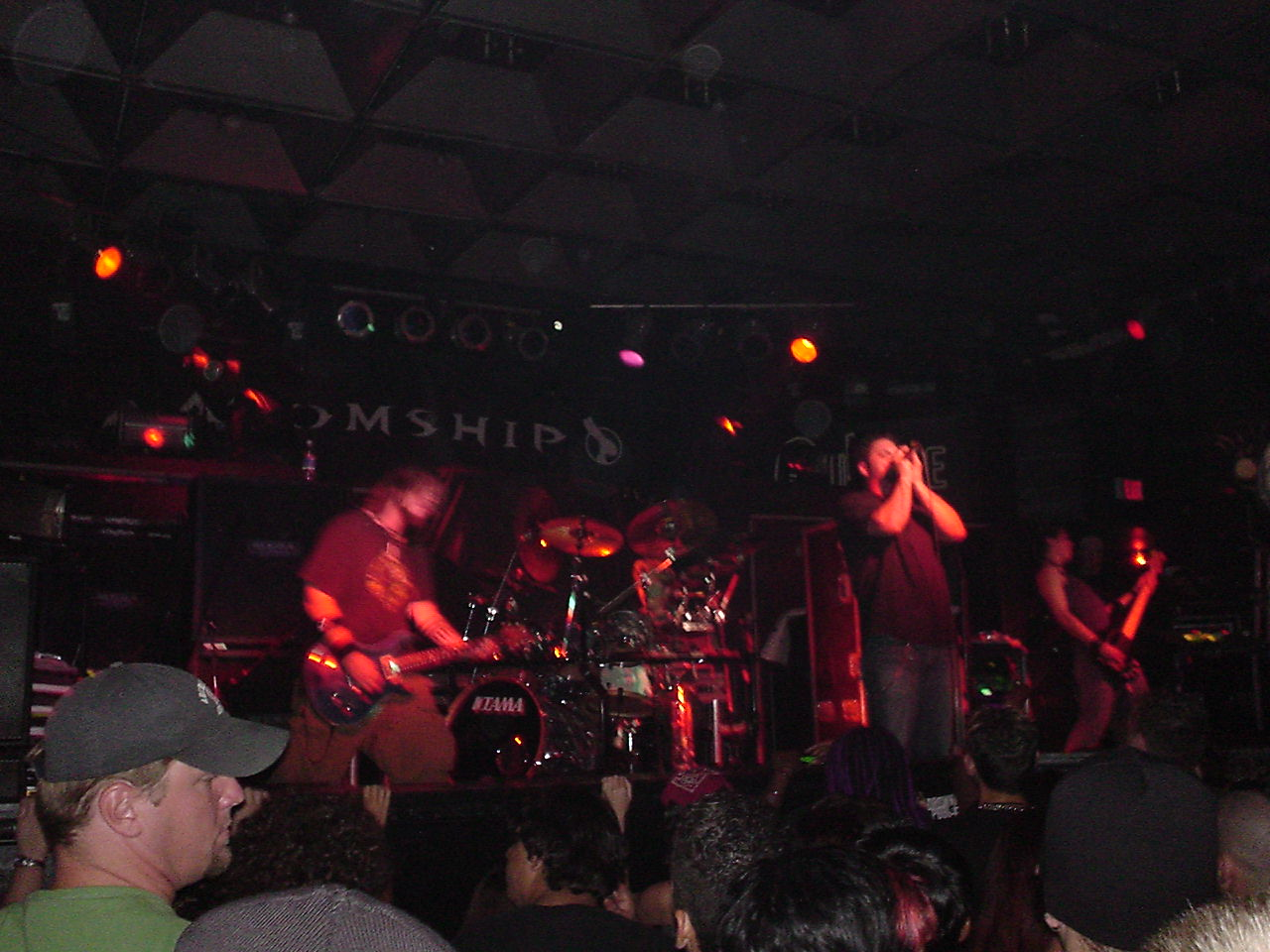
- Atomship performing c. 2004

Background information
- Also known as: Watership Down (2002, 2010–2017); Atomship (2002–2004, 2017–present); AtomshipDown (2006–2009)
- Origin: Ocean Springs, Mississippi, U.S.
- Genres: Alternative metal, alternative rock, post-grunge, progressive rock
- Years active: 2002–2004, 2006–present
- Labels: Wind-Up Records (2002–2004)
- Members: Chad Kent; Roy Williams; Jared Slade
- Past members: Derek Pardoe; Nathan Slade; Joey Culver; Jesse "Bones" Duncan; Brooks Hubbert

Atomship (formerly known as Watership Down and AtomshipDown) is an American alternative metal band that was most recently composed of Joey Culver, Chad Kent, Roy Williams, and Jared Slade (brother of Nathan Slade). They are best known for their 2004 single "Pencil Fight". Nathan Slade was the band's original guitarist and songwriter until his death in December 2009. The band was known as Watership Down in 2002, before changing their name due to copyright to Atomship that year. Due to original vocalist Derek Pardoe's anxiety, Joey Culver took over his place as lead singer, and for the recording of their debut album The Crash of '47, released in 2004. Atomship later broke up after the death of Nathan Slade. This led to the band's disbandment later that year. The original band members briefly reunited in 2017 with Jared Slade and performed several local shows In 2006, Atomship reformed as AtomshipDown. In 2010, AtomshipDown reverted their name back to Watership Down. In 2017, the band reformed Atomship with vocalist Joey Culver.

== History ==
=== Atomship ===
The band was formed in 2002 as Watership Down, named after Richard Adams' classic tale of the same name, and was originally composed of vocalist and bassist Derek Pardoe, guitarist Nathan Slade, and drummer Chad Kent. Although renamed to Atomship later that year, the band retains a cartoon alien rabbit as its logo, designed by Nathan Slade, reflecting the group's interest in UFOs and extraterrestrials. During production of their debut album, Pardoe suffered severe anxiety that led to him stepping aside from the recording process. Joey Culver was brought in as a session vocalist to record the album. The finished album, The Crash of '47 was released on May 4, 2004. The album's title references the alleged date of the UFO crash in Roswell, New Mexico. "We're fascinated with some of these things", Slade says. "We're not conspiracy theory nuts but it is interesting how the media covers up some stuff that's obviously there. We have a pretty strong thirst for knowledge." Nathan Slade played the bass on five songs, with Ugly Kid Joe bassist Cordell Crockett playing bass on the rest. The band recruited bassist Roy Williams for touring in promotion for the album. Not long after being dropped from Wind-Up Records in late 2004, the band had a falling-out with Joey Culver and subsequently disbanded.

=== AtomshipDown ===
In 2006, Atomship reformed as AtomshipDown, with the band reuniting with original singer Derek Pardoe. In 2007, the band announced that they were going to release two albums simultaneously. The first of these albums was to be entitled Let Us Sleep Awhile, while the second was untitled, but labeled as the evolution of Atomship. Derek Pardoe founded "Omni-Mind Productions" at which the band recorded the tracks "Deflower", "For So", "Red", and "Magnolia".

In an interview posted on the band's Myspace page on February 10, 2007, vocalist Derek Pardoe stated the following:

The band's debut album, The Crash of '47, was well received nationally and essential listening locally. The success of The Crash of '47 was due, in large part, to Derek Pardoe, the band's original lead singer. Pardoe wrote the lion's share of the lyrics along with Slade and Kent. The trio has since reunited, and is hard at work on the follow-up to their debut. They say they've never been happier, and I know their large and loyal fan base is thrilled to have the core unit back together. "We did this huge circle," Pardoe said. "You know, when we came back to write, and doing all these different kinds of things, we ended up right back where we were, because it's what we enjoy."

Pardoe also stated that the new album was progressing slowly. The band began working on a demo reel for Let Us Sleep Awhile. The final track written for this demo was entitled "Silhouette".

=== Death of Nathan Slade and Watership Down ===
Derek Pardoe announced on the band's Facebook and MySpace pages that guitarist Nathan Slade died on December 5, 2009. The cause of death was an accidental drug overdose on a prescription medicine. The band then recruited guitarist Jesse Duncan to fill the vacant guitar slot. After Slade's death, the band reverted their name back to Watership Down.

On June 15, 2010, Derek posted the following on YouTube: "Self Recorded Demo coming soon. Thank you all for being so patient while Chad and I took time to deal with the loss of Nathan and took our time deciding if we would play again as Watership Down and release what work we had done with Nathan including some new music we had written together." In addition to some songs recorded for Let Us Sleep Awhile, confirmed songs on the album are "Come Back" and "Seven Months". The former is where Derek announced the above. The latter was featured in Derek Pardoe's tribute to Nathan Slade. On August 27, 2010, an article about the group was featured in the South Mississippi newspaper the Sun Herald. In the article, the band's new guitar player, Jesse Duncan was announced. "I was out for a long enough time. People have asked me to play in other projects, but I don't think I'm ever going to stand on a stage again without Chad," Pardoe stated when asked if he will play live. "The way to beat anxiety is by realizing that you cause it. I had some hard times, and there was a period when people thought all I did during the day was panic. But things become more important than anxiety. You become stronger for the experience, though." Touring bassist Roy Williams is involved in the making of the new album, which was set to be released in 2012.

Return to Atomship

In March 2017, after years of sporadic information from the Watership Down Facebook page, Derek Pardoe announced that drummer Chad Kent has decided to reform Atomship with vocalist Joey Culver and bassist Roy Williams, thus ending his association with the band. In addition to Kent, Culver, and Williams, the band added late guitarist Nathan Slade's brother, Jared Slade on guitars.

Death of Joey Culver

Atomship vocalist Joey Culver died unexpectedly on December 31, 2020. He drowned in West Palm Beach.

== Band members ==
Members

- Chad Kent – drums, percussion (2002–2004, 2006–present)
- Roy Williams – bass (2003–2004 [touring], 2006–present)
- Jared Slade – lead guitar (2017–present)

Former members

- Derek Pardoe – lead vocals, bass (2002–2004, 2006–2017)
- Nathan Slade – lead guitar, bass (2002–2004, 2006–2009) (deceased)
- Joey Culver – lead vocals (2004 [session], 2017–2020) (deceased)
- Jesse "Bones" Duncan – lead guitar (2013)
- Brooks Hubbert – lead guitar (2014–2017)

Session members

- Cordell Crockett – bass (2004)

== Discography ==
Album title	Date of release	Label
The Crash of '47	May 4, 2004	Wind-Up
