= Motel California =

Studio album by Ugly Kid Joe
- Released: October 22, 1996
- Recorded: 1996
- Genre: Hard rock, heavy metal, alternative rock
- Length: 39:30
- Label: Evilution
- Producer: Ugly Kid Joe

Ugly Kid Joe chronology
Menace to Sobriety (1995)	Motel California (1996)	The Very Best of Ugly Kid Joe: As Ugly as It Gets (1998)

Motel California is the third album by the American rock band Ugly Kid Joe, and released on October 22, 1996. Motel California was the last full-length studio album until 2015. The group disbanded in January 1997 and reformed 13 years later in January 2010. The album received indifferent reviews and was a commercial failure.

The title is a parody of the Eagles' album, Hotel California. The song "Rage Against the Answering Machine" is a pun on the name of the Los Angeles rock band Rage Against the Machine.

The re-recorded acoustic version of the song "Would You Like to be There" appears as a bonus track from 2012 EP Stairway to Hell.

Music videos for the songs "Bicycle Wheels" and "Sandwich" were previously unreleased for almost a decade. They were finally surfaced on the internet in 2006.

== Production ==
The album was recorded with the Butcher Bros. in Philadelphia.

== Reception ==
Professional ratings
Review scores
Source	Rating
AllMusic	3/5 stars
The Encyclopedia of Popular Music	2/5 stars
Rock Hard	5/10

AllMusic wrote that Ugly Kid Joe "return to their roots, bashing out grungy metal in their garage and recording it for posterity ... Motel California works a lot better than it should, sounding fiercer and more committed."

== Track listing ==
All tracks written by Ugly Kid Joe.

No.	Title	Length
1.	"It's a Lie"	3:01
2.	"Dialogue"	2:27
3.	"Sandwich"	2:46
4.	"Rage Against the Answering Machine"	1:40
5.	"Would You Like to Be There"	3:18
6.	"Little Red Man"	4:02
7.	"Bicycle Wheels"	2:01
8.	"Father"	3:31
9.	"Undertow"	4:31
10.	"Shine"	2:51
11.	"Strange"	4:22
12.	"12 Cents"	4:54

== Personnel ==
Ugly Kid Joe

- Whitfield Crane – vocals
- Dave Fortman – guitars
- Klaus Eichstadt – guitars
- Cordell Crockett – bass
- Shannon Larkin – drums

Additional musicians

- Lemmy Kilmister – background vocals on "Little Red Man"
- Jennifer Barry – background vocals on "Would You Like to Be There"
- Angus Cooke – cello on "Undertow"
- Tim Wheater – flute on "12 Cents"

Technical personnel

- Phil Nicolo – mixing
- Jim Mitchell – engineer
- Jon E. Love – engineer
- Mark Casselman – second engineer
- Greg Fidelman – second engineer
- Mike Fasano – drum technician
- Craig Fujii – guitar technician
- Manny Lecuona – mastering

== Charts ==
Chart performance for Motel California
Chart (1996)	Peak position
Australian Albums (ARIA)	129
UK Albums (OCC)	128
