= Le Bonheur (Storm Large album) =

Studio album by Storm Large
- Released: October 7, 2014
- Recorded: Kung Fu Bakery, Portland; April – June 2014
- Genre: Pop; rock
- Length: 47:08
- Label: Heinz
- Producer: Storm Large; Robert Taylor

Storm Large chronology
Crazy Enough (2009)	Le Bonheur (2014)

Le Bonheur (French for "The Happiness") is an album by American singer-songwriter Storm Large. It marks the first release for Large with her newly formed band of the same name.

The album was released on Heinz Records, a record label founded by the band Pink Martini, with whom Large has been performing since 2011.

Le Bonheur contains eleven cover versions and two original songs.

== Track listing ==
No.	Title	Writer(s)	Length
1.	"I've Got You Under My Skin"	Cole Porter	4:15
2.	"Sacred Love"	Paul Hudson; Darryl Jenifer; Gary Miller	4:25
3.	"A Woman's Heart"	Storm Large; James Beaton	3:10
4.	"I Think It's Going to Rain Today"	Randy Newman	2:34
5.	"Forbidden Fruit"	Adam Mackintosh	4:43
6.	"N.I.B.^{[*]}"	Geezer Butler; Ozzy Osbourne; Tony Iommi; Bill Ward	3:50
7.	"The Lady Is a Tramp"	Richard Rodgers; Lorenz Hart	2:33
8.	"Unchained Melody^{[a]}"	Alex North; Hy Zaret	3:48
9.	"Ne me quitte pas^{[**]}"	Jacques Brel; Rod McKuen	4:44
10.	"It's All Right with Me"	Cole Porter	3:11
11.	"Saving All My Love for You^{[b]}"	Tom Waits	3:11
12.	"Satellite of Love^{[c]}"	Lou Reed	4:16
13.	"Stand up for Me^{[d]}"	Storm Large	2:27

* In English and Spanish
** In English and French

a Guest vocals by Holcombe Waller
b Guest vocals by Michael Geier of Puddles Pity Party
c Guest vocals by Sofia, Melanie and Amanda von Trapp of The von Trapps
d Guest vocals by Sofia, Melanie, Amanda and August von Trapp of The von Trapps

== Credits and personnel ==
Credits adapted from the album's liner notes.

- Storm Large – vocals, producer, arrangements
- James Beaton – piano, arrangements
- Scott Weddle – guitar, arrangements
- Greg Eklund – drums, arrangements
- Matt Brown – bass
- Robert Taylor – producer
- Stephen A. Taylor – orchestrations
- Norman Leyden – orchestrations
- 3 Leg Torso – arrangements
- David Friedlander – engineer, mixing
- Bernie Grundman – mastering
- Jim Silke – cover art
- Laura Domela – photography
- Mike King – design, layout

== Charts ==
Chart performance for Le Bonheur
Chart (2014)	Peak position
US Heatseekers Albums (Billboard)	23
