= Uglier Than They Used ta Be =

Studio album by Ugly Kid Joe
- Released: September 18, 2015
- Recorded: January 19, 2015 – February 20, 2015
- Genre: Hard rock; heavy metal
- Length: 48:27
- Label: Metalville/UKJ Records
- Producer: Dave Fortman

Ugly Kid Joe chronology
Stairway to Hell (2012)	Uglier Than They Used ta Be (2015)	Rad Wings of Destiny (2022)

Professional ratings
Review scores
Source	Rating
Exclaim!	7/10
Planetmosh	5/5 stars

Uglier Than They Used ta Be is the fourth album by the American rock band Ugly Kid Joe, released in Europe on September 18, 2015, and in North America on October 16.

On February 4, 2015, Ugly Kid Joe started a crowdfunding effort through PledgeMusic.com to fund their new album called, Uglier Than They Used ta Be. The album was completely funded by February 20. Produced by the band's rhythm guitarist Dave Fortman, Uglier Than They Used ta Be is the first full-length studio album in nearly 19 years since the third album Motel California (1996), making it the longest gap between the band's two studio albums.

== Critical reception ==
Calling the band "a scourge but now a saviour of heavy rock" before, Chris Ayers of Exclaim! wrote that "Ugly Kid Joe prove that their catchy hooks and solid vocals are cool to like again on Uglier Than They Used ta Be".

== Track listing ==
1. "Hell Ain't Hard to Find" – 3:48
2. "Let the Record Play" – 3:50
3. "Bad Seed" – 5:00
4. "Mirror of the Man" – 3:55
5. "She's Already Gone" – 4:21
6. "Nothing Ever Changes" – 3:23
7. "My Old Man" – 3:41
8. "Under the Bottom" – 5:47
9. "Ace of Spades" (Motörhead cover) – 2:44
10. "The Enemy" – 6:06
11. "Papa Was a Rolling Stone" (The Undisputed Truth cover) (feat. Dallas Frasca) – 5:46

== Lineup ==
- Whitfield Crane – vocals
- Dave Fortman – guitar, producer
- Klaus Eichstadt – guitar
- Cordell Crockett – bass
- Shannon Larkin – drums

Additional personnel:

- Sonny Mayo – additional guitars
- Zac Morris – additional drums
- David Troia - engineer
- Phil Campbell – guest guitar (on "My Old Man", "Under the Bottom", and "Ace of Spades")

== Charts ==
Chart (2015)	Peak position
UK Albums (OCC)	84
