= The Sounds of Solid =

Studio album by Sugartooth
- Released: September 10, 1996
- Genres: Alternative rock, grunge
- Length: 36:51
- Label: DGC
- Producer: The Dust Brothers

Sugartooth chronology
Sugartooth (1994)	The Sounds of Solid (1996)	Volume 3 (2023)

The Sounds of Solid is the second studio album by the American rock band Sugartooth, released on September 10th, 1996. The album was recorded with production team The Dust Brothers.

The album received a two and a half star rating from the Los Angeles Times.

== Track listing ==
1. Club Foot - 3:06
2. Booty Street - 3:14
3. Spiral - 3:17
4. All for Me - 1:53
5. Otra Vez - 3:14
6. Come on In - 3:37
7. Toothless - 3:32
8. Harajuana - 2:00
9. Solid - 4:02
10. Seven & Seven - 2:34
11. Frisbee - 2:50
12. We'd - 3:32

== Personnel ==
- Marc Hutner - vocals, guitar
- Josh Blum - bass
- Dusty Watson - drums
