= Rad Wings of Destiny =

Studio album by Ugly Kid Joe
- Released: October 21, 2022
- Recorded: Early 2022
- Genre: Hard rock; heavy metal
- Length: 40:37
- Label: Metalville/UKJ Records
- Producer: Mark Dodson, Dave Fortman

Ugly Kid Joe chronology
Uglier Than They Used ta Be (2015)	Rad Wings of Destiny (2022)

Singles from Rad Wings of Destiny
- 1. "That Ain't Livin" Released: June 9, 2022; 2. "Kill the Pain" Released: July 21, 2022; 3. "Long Road" Released: August 18, 2022; 4. "Failure" Released: September 23, 2022; 5. "Lola" Released: October 21, 2022

Professional ratings
Review scores
Source	Rating
Maximum Volume Music	7.5/10
Metal Planet Music	4/5
Distorted Sound	4/10

Rad Wings of Destiny is the fifth album by the American rock band Ugly Kid Joe, released on October 21, 2022.

The title is a parody of the Judas Priest album, Sad Wings of Destiny.

== Critical reception ==
Tom Cornell of CGCM Rock Radio wrote that "Showing perhaps more subtlety than all those years ago, but still maintaining the fun and silliness in small doses, they still know how to rock and entertain."

== Track listing ==
All tracks written by Ugly Kid Joe, except "Lola", written by Ray Davies.

1. "That Ain't Livin'" – 4:18
2. "Not Like the Other" – 4:36
3. "Everything's Changing" – 4:41
4. "Kill the Pain" – 3:52
5. "Lola" (The Kinks cover) – 4:03
6. "Dead Friends Play" – 3:42
7. "Up in the City" – 4:51
8. "Drinkin' and Drivin'" – 2:23
9. "Failure" – 4:48
10. "Long Road" – 3:33

== Lineup ==
- Whitfield Crane – vocals
- Dave Fortman – guitar, producer
- Klaus Eichstadt – guitar
- Cordell Crockett – bass
- Zac Morris – drums ( tracks 2, 3, 4, 8, 9, 10 )

Additional personnel:

- Shannon Larkin – drums ( tracks 1, 5, 6, 7 )
- Jeff Curran – guitar ( tracks 1, 8 ) and banjo ( track 8 )
- Ram Cantu - piano ( track 8 )

== Charts ==
Chart (2022)	Peak position
German Albums (Offizielle Top 100)	67
Swiss Albums (Schweizer Hitparade)	39
