= Sugartooth =

US musical group

- L-R: Josh Blum, Marc Hutner and Dusty Watson

Background information
- Origin: California, United States
- Genres: Alternative rock, grunge
- Years active: 1990-1997; 2021-present
- Label: DGC
- Members: Marc Hutner; Josh Blum; Joey Castillo
- Past members: Timothy Michael Gruse; Dusty Watson; Tommy Southard; Dave Kushner; Dave Fortman
- Website: sugartooth.band

Sugartooth is an alternative rock band who formed in 1990.

Timothy Michael Gruse (guitar), Josh Blum (bass), Dave Fortman (guitar) and Joey Castillo (drums) formed the group after meeting each other in the Southern California band circuit while playing in separate groups. After the departure of their original singer, Marc Hutner joined the band as the singer. But it wasn't until Dave Fortman left Sugartooth to join Ugly Kid Joe that Marc was able to play guitar in addition to singing.

The band's self-titled debut was released in 1994 on DGC Records. "Sold My Fortune", one of the singles from that record, gained popularity after appearing on an episode of Beavis and Butt-head. The group performed with bands like Slayer, Stone Temple Pilots, and Soundgarden.

While touring for their first album, Timothy Gruse left the band, and Dave Kushner was hired to fill in for the group. As the band was starting to work on their second album, The Sounds of Solid, Joey Castillo left to join Danzig.

The Sounds of Solid was produced by The Dust Brothers. During recording, Sugartooth contributed music to a song called "Tortured Man" for the soundtrack to the film Private Parts. This song would later feature vocals by Howard Stern (see Private Parts: The Album). Released in 1996, The Sound of Solid was a significant departure in style from their debut record, and was not well received by critics. After the commercial failure of the album, the band split up.

In late 2021, official social media accounts were created for the band, where it was announced that original members Hutner, Blum, and Castillo were working on new music. In March 2022, the band confirmed that a new album was in the works, due out later in the year.

On April 21st, 2023, they released their third album, Volume 3.

== Discography ==
=== Albums ===
- Sugartooth (1994)
- The Sounds of Solid (1996)
- Volume 3 (2023)
