= Menace to Sobriety (Ugly Kid Joe album) =

1995 studio album by Ugly Kid Joe

Studio album by Ugly Kid Joe
- Released: June 13, 1995
- Recorded: 1994–1995
- Genre: Funk metal
- Length: 44:14; 49:49 (non-U.S.)
- Label: Mercury
- Producer: GGGarth

Ugly Kid Joe chronology
America's Least Wanted (1992)	Menace to Sobriety (1995)	Motel California (1996)

Professional ratings
Review scores
Source	Rating
AllMusic	4/5 stars
The Encyclopedia of Popular Music	3/5 stars
Entertainment Weekly	B
Kerrang!	4/5 stars
MusicHound Rock	1.5/5 stars
Q	4/5 stars
Select	1/5 stars

Menace to Sobriety is the second studio album by American rock band Ugly Kid Joe. It was released in 1995 through Mercury Records. The album title is an allusion to the movie Menace II Society. It peaked at No. 25 on the UK Albums Chart. "Milkman's Son", "Tomorrow's World" and power ballad "Cloudy Skies" were released as singles and have music videos each. Menace to Sobriety is the first album to feature former Wrathchild America/Souls at Zero drummer Shannon Larkin on drums.

The album showcases the heavier sound with darker lyrics compared to the band's previous album and EP, yet without discarding humorous elements.

Despite critical acclaim, the album did not sell well in the United States compared to band's previous releases, placed 178th in Billboard Top 200. It was the band's final album with the label, dropping them later in the same year of its release.

== Critical reception ==
Trouser Press noted that singer Whitfield Crane adopted "a new and nasty W. Axl Rose vocal affliction on some songs", and wrote that the band "reintroduce themselves as a growly, serious rock lot attempting to fill the gap left by the Gunners' silence". The Washington Post called the album "more varied and tuneful than its predecessor".

== Track listing ==
1. "Intro" – 1:49
2. "God" (Whitfield Crane, Klaus Eichstadt, Dave Fortman) – 2:54
3. "Tomorrow's World" (Crane, Eichstadt, Fortman, Shannon Larkin) – 4:18
4. "Clover" (Crane, Eichstadt, Fortman) – 3:34
5. "C.U.S.T." (Crane, Fortman) – 2:59
6. "Milkman's Son" (Crane, Fortman) – 3:51
7. "Suckerpath" (Crockett) – 4:53
8. "Cloudy Skies" (Crane, Fortman) – 4:28
9. "Jesus Rode a Harley" (Crane, Fortman) – 3:15
10. "10/10" (Crockett) – 3:37
11. "V.I.P." (Crane, Eichstadt, Larkin) – 3:46
12. "Oompa" (Crane, Crockett) – 2:04 (this song is track 7 on side one on the cassette tape)
13. "Candle Song" (Crane, Fortman) – 2:56
14. "Slower Than Nowhere" (Crane, Tom Fletcher, Crockett)- 5:25 (non-U.S. releases only)

== Personnel ==
- Whitfield Crane – lead vocals
- Klaus Eichstadt – guitar, backing vocals
- Dave Fortman – guitar, backing vocals
- Cordell Crockett – bass guitar, backing vocals
- Shannon Larkin – drums, percussion

== Charts ==
Chart performance for Menace to Sobriety
Chart (1995)	Peak position
Australian Albums (ARIA)	19
Austrian Albums (Ö3 Austria)	24
Belgian Albums (Ultratop Wallonia)	28
Dutch Albums (Album Top 100)	86
Finnish Albums (Suomen virallinen lista)	26
German Albums (Offizielle Top 100)	29
Swiss Albums (Schweizer Hitparade)	22
UK Albums (OCC)	25
US Billboard 200	178
