= Storm Large =

American singer and actor (born 1969)

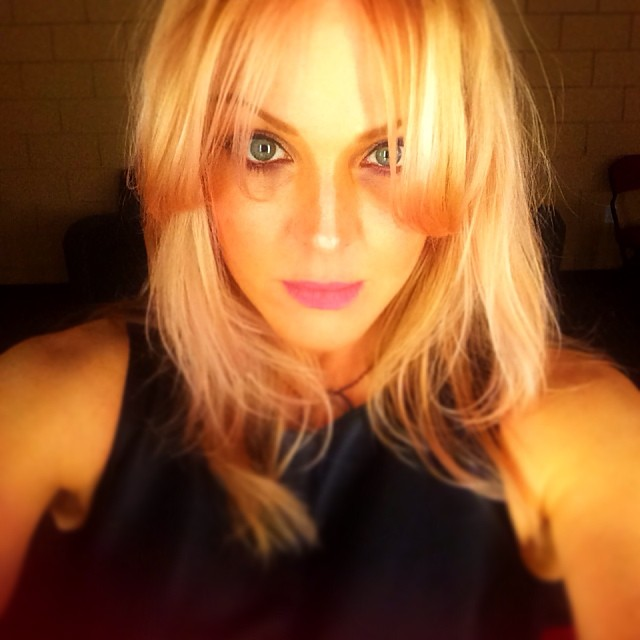

Background information
- Born: Susan Storm Large; June 25, 1969 (age 56); Southborough, Massachusetts, U.S.
- Origin: San Francisco, California, U.S.
- Genres: Rock, metal, jazz
- Instrument: Vocals
- Years active: 1989–present
- Website: www.stormlarge.com

Storm Large (born Susan Storm Large, June 25, 1969) is an American singer, songwriter, actress and author. She attracted national attention as a contestant on the CBS reality television show Rock Star: Supernova. A resident of Portland, Oregon, Large performs nationally with her own band and tours internationally with the Portland-based band Pink Martini.

== Personal life ==
Storm Large was born and raised in suburban Southborough, Massachusetts. From the age of five, she started singing and writing songs. She graduated in 1987 from St. Mark's School, a private school. Her father Henry Large was a history teacher there as well as head coach of the football team before he retired.

After high school, she attended the American Academy of Dramatic Arts in New York.

Large moved to Portland, Oregon in 2002, originally planning to quit music and attend the Western Culinary Institute but at the urging of friends and in particular Frank Faillace, owner of the Portland rock club Dante's, she began singing again with a band she called "The Balls".

Large is bisexual, although she dislikes the term and instead calls herself "sexually omnivorous."

== Career ==
While in San Francisco, Storm formed the bands Flower SF, Storm and Her Dirty Mouth and Storm, Inc. Storm also performed with Michael Cavaseno as the duo Storm and Michael or Storm and Friends.

Storm, Inc. featured Shaunna Hall of 4 Non Blondes and P-Funk fame as a rhythm guitarist. Hall was featured on The Calm Years LP and toured with the band for a few months after the album's release.

On January 12, 2012, Storm published a memoir titled Crazy Enough. It’s an expansion on her cabaret show produced by Portland Center Stage. The book, published by Free Press, is an account of her growing up with a mother with psychological issues, her stint as a competitive rower and her eventual successes. One of her songs from the aforementioned show, "8 Miles Wide"—a comedic song with minor innuendo -- was made into a music video released in 2009.

=== The Balls ===
The Balls, also known as Storm and the Balls, were formed in May/June 2002 after Large moved to Portland from San Francisco. Storm and the Balls consisted of Davey Loprinzi (aka "Hotrod" Davey Nipples, formerly of Sweaty Nipples) on bass guitar, James Beaton on keyboards and Brian Parnel on drums. The Balls drew what local media called a "cult-like" following in clubs, primarily during Wednesday night shows at Dante's. They perform "lounge-core, mash-up" renditions of artists such as ABBA, Black Sabbath, Cheap Trick, Billy Idol, Led Zeppelin Motörhead and Olivia Newton-John as well as their own compositions. Large worked part-time as a bartender at Dante's when not touring with The Balls. The Balls opened for Everclear, Nina Hagen, Hank 3, Pleasure Club and Nancy Sinatra.

=== Drumattica ===
During live shows, Storm has filled in for Jen Folker on vocals alongside Rob Wynia (of Floater) with Drumattica out of Portland.

=== San Francisco ===
Before moving to Portland, she performed in the San Francisco Bay Area with her former bands Storm Inc., Storm and Her Dirty Mouth and FlowerSF.

=== Pink Martini ===
After Pink Martini vocalist China Forbes underwent vocal cord surgery, Large toured with the band from July 4 through December 16, 2011 as a temporary replacement. She then joined the band on 2013 album Get Happy and as co-lead singer on the follow-up world tour. She continues to perform worldwide with the group.

=== Theatre ===
Large played Sally Bowles in a Portland Center Stage (PCS) production of the musical Cabaret. PCS is also the site of the premiere of her autobiographical musical Crazy Enough.

She has finished filming Rid of Me (by James Westby), starring Katie O'Grady, John Keyser, Theresa Russell and Art Alexakis.

In 2008, Storm Large premiered her autobiographical one woman show, Crazy Enough, at Portland Center Stage. She got rave reviews. The show appeared at the Edinburgh Festival Fringe in 2010 and Off-Broadway in the spring of 2011.

She appeared in Randy Newman's Harps and Angels at the Mark Taper Forum from November 10 - December 22, 2010.

== Television And Film ==
=== Rock Star ===
Large is also known for her appearances as a contestant on Rock Star: Supernova. She was eliminated on September 6, 2006 (in the last show before the season finale). Several contestants on the show, especially Dilana, gave her the nickname “Tara,” which even the judges picked up on and began using. After elimination, host Dave Navarro recorded a guitar track for her single "Ladylike" and she was slated to open for the band Rock Star Supernova on tour in January 2007, though she and fellow contestant Magni Ásgeirsson were dropped from the billing for financial reasons.

=== Other appearances ===
In addition to being a contestant on Rock Star: Supernova, Large appeared as a guest on The Ellen DeGeneres Show on September 11, 2006.

On September 26, 2006, Large sang "The Star-Spangled Banner" on the second-season finale of ESPN reality television show The Contender. She performed the national anthem again on November 4, 2006, at the Portland Trail Blazers' opening home game of their 2006-2007 NBA season. The broadcast appeared on Fox Sports Northwest, the Seattle and Portland affiliate of Fox Sports Net.

Large appeared on America's Got Talent on June 14, 2021, performing a cover of "I've Got You Under My Skin," which received an enthusiastic response, allowing her to move on to the Judge's Cut round. None of the judges seemed to know who she was, prompting a reporter at Willamette Week to quip, "In show business, you're nobody until you impress Howie Mandel."

Storm has a small role as a TV Host in the feature film Admissions (2004) directed by Melissa Painter and starring Lauren Ambrose, Amy Madigan and Christopher Lloyd. She has a cameo appearance as a German milkmaid in the feature film Bucksville (2011) directed by Chel White and starring Thomas Stroppel.

Storm plays one of the main characters in a 20 minute short titled The Punishing Business (2014) directed by Heather Harlow.

Storm Large has the role of "She" in the 15 minute short Mad/woman (2022).

Storm Large also costars in the indie film Rid of Me.

== Discography ==
=== Studio albums ===
Album name	Release	Storm's Alias
Big Daddy Large	1995	FlowerSF
Storm and Her Dirty Mouth	1998	Storm and Her Dirty Mouth
The Calm Years	2000	Storm Inc.
Hanging With The Balls	2003	The Balls
Vasectomy	2005	The Balls
Ladylike Side One	2007	Storm Large
Crazy Enough	2009	Storm Large
Le Bonheur	2014	Storm Large

=== As a guest or session musician ===
- 2026 – Mewgenics – RIDICULON

=== Singles ===
Single title	Note	Release date
"Ladylike"	Storm and The Balls	2006
"Ladylike"	Featuring Dave Navarro	2006

=== Other album appearances ===
- "Little Drummer Boy" (as FlowerSF) on Christmas Time in San Francisco by Various Artists 1995
- "Ego" (as FlowerSF) on She's a Rebel! by Various Artists 1997
- "About You," "Let Go" on Infinite Syndrome by Bugs 1997
- "I'm Not Alright", "Lust", "Superman", "Ima Yora", "Geraldine", "Crazy Love" on Storm & Her Dirty Mouth by Storm & Her Dirty Mouth 1998
- "You Don't Bring Me Flowers Anymore (Ruff Mix)" on You Are Here by Insecto 1999
- "Not Alright" (as Storm And Her Dirty Mouth, credited as "Storm") on Unscrubbed - Live From The Laundromat III by Various Artists 1999
- "Rape Me" (as Storm Inc.) on Nearvana: San Francisco by Various Artists 2002
- "Down," "Lovetractors 4 Sale" on Planet of the Fish by Alien Lovestock 2004
- "Valentine's Day," "Closer Closer," "Ruin Everything" on Sessions at East by Auditory Sculpture 2006
- "Asylum Road" on Dearly Departed by Various Artists 2008
- "Voices" on Shakers' Sessions by Various Artist 2011
- "Quizás, Quizás, Quizás", "Omide Zendegani", "Până Când Nu Te Iubeam", and "Sway" on Get Happy by Pink Martini 2013
- "Hushabye Mountain" on Dream a Little Dream by Pink Martini and The Von Trapps 2014
- "A Woman's Heart" and "It's Alright With Me" on All In by the Louisville Orchestra and Teddy Abrams conducting 2017
- "Summertime" on The Gershwin Moment by Kirill Gerstein and the St. Louis Symphony Orchestra conducted by David Robertson 2018

== Ladylike, Side One (EP) ==
Ladylike, Side One

Studio album by Storm Large
- Released: October 23, 2007
- Recorded: Le Garage, Portland, OR Pulse SStudios, Los Angeles, CA Sea View Studios, Los Angeles, CA The Greene Room, Los Angeles, CA Zoe Rose Studio, Los Angeles, CA
- Genre: Pop; rock
- Length: 25:40
- Label: Big Daddy Large

Storm Large chronology
Ladylike, Side One (2007)	Crazy Enough (2009)

Ladylike, Side One is an EP by American singer-songwriter Storm Large. The track LadyLike was recorded with Dave Navarro on guitar after her elimination from Rock Star Supernova. Because it did not chart, it does not have a separate article.

=== Track listing ===
No.	Title	Writer(s)	Length
1.	"Beautiful"	Storm Large * Kevin Carnes * Shaunna Hall	4:45
2.	"LadyLike"	Storm Large * James Beaton * Jeff Trott	3:08
3.	"Fat Chick's Revenge"	Storm Large; Jeff Trott	3:34
4.	"You & You & Me"	Storm Large * Kevin Carnes	2:23
5.	"Twisted Jimmy"	Storm Large	3:00
6.	"Under You"	Storm Large	4:47
7.	"Where Is My Mind"		4:07
Total length:			25:40

=== Personnel ===
- Storm Large - vocals
- Dave Navarro - guitar (track 2)

== See also ==
- List of LGBT people from Portland, Oregon
