= Crazy Enough (Storm Large album) =

Studio album by Storm Large
- Released: June 2009
- Recorded: Mississippi Studios, Portland, 2009
- Genre: Indie, Rock, Alternative, Punk
- Length: 39:24
- Label: Big Daddy Large
- Producer: Storm Large, James Beaton, Jim Brunberg

Storm Large chronology
Ladylike, Side One (2007)	Crazy Enough (2009)	Le Bonheur (2014)

Crazy Enough is an album by Portland rock singer Storm Large. It contains all the songs performed in the eponymous theater piece written and played by Large.

== Track listing ==
All tracks are written by Storm Large and James Beaton, except where noted.

No.	Title	Writer(s)	Length
1.	"Call Me Crazy"	Storm Large	3:06
2.	"Throw Away the Key"		2:22
3.	"Halogen"	Storm Large, Michael Cavaseno, James Beaton	3:20
4.	"Put It In, Pull It Out"		2:31
5.	"Inside Outside"		4:34
6.	"8 Miles Wide"		4:19
7.	"Under You"	Storm Large	4:50
8.	"After All"		3:37
9.	"Lullaby Song"	Storm Large, Michael Cavaseno, James Beaton	2:50
10.	"Where Is My Mind?"	Charles Thompson	3:51
11.	"Inside Outside (Reprise)"		4:04

== Personnel ==
- Storm Large: Vocals, producer
- James Beaton: Piano, guitars, keyboards, producer
- Jim Brunberg: Guitars, bass, backing vocals, engineer, mixing, producer
- David Loprinzi: Bass, guitars
- Greg Eklund: Drums
- Keiko Araki: Violin
- Adam Hoornstra: Viola, string arrangements
- Shelby Smith: Assistant engineer
- Jonathan Newsome: Assistant engineer
- John "Lou" Lousteau: Engineer
- Dave McNair: Mastering
- Laura Domela: Photography
- Queenby Moone: Graphic design
