= Everything About You (Ugly Kid Joe song) =

1992 single by Ugly Kid Joe

Single by Ugly Kid Joe

from the album As Ugly as They Wanna Be and America's Least Wanted
- B-side: "Whiplash Liquor"
- Released: March 19, 1992
- Genre: Pop-metal
- Length: 4:06 (radio edit); 4:20 (album version)
- Label: Mercury
- Songwriters: Whitfield Crane; Klaus Eichstadt
- Producers: Ryan Dorn; Ugly Kid Joe

Ugly Kid Joe singles chronology
"Everything About You" (1992)	"Neighbor" (1993)

"Everything About You" is a song by American heavy metal band Ugly Kid Joe, originally from their 1991 EP, As Ugly as They Wanna Be. The pop-metal song gained popularity after being featured in the 1992 hit film Wayne's World and was later included on the band's full-length debut album, America's Least Wanted, which was also released in 1992.

Issued in March 1992 by Mercury Records as Ugly Kid Joe's debut single, "Everything About You" was a commercial success around the world, peaking at number three on the UK Singles Chart, number nine on the US Billboard Hot 100, and number five in Ireland, the Netherlands, and Norway. In Australia, the song was released as part of the As Ugly as They Wanna Be EP, reaching number four on the ARIA Singles Chart.

The song has been seen as "[signifying] the intersection of fading hair metal and rising grunge by combining the former’s optimistic sound with the latter’s pessimistic lyrics".

== Song information ==
Singer Whitfield Crane said the song is about a cynical childhood friend of the band's. "He's not mean-spirited by any means, but he can sure pick apart any situation. And he always had that charm about him," said Crane.

The song describes, with an uptempo beat, a list of things the lead singer hates or doesn't care about: the weather, "your" family, and "everything about you." In the bridge, the singer admits that he has a bad attitude, but that he enjoys hating everything and refuses to change. The song closes with the well-known couplet "Shave and a Haircut".

The re-recorded version includes a spoken intro by actress Julia Sweeney, in the role of Pat, the overweight androgynous character that appeared on Saturday Night Live, saying "Are you the guys on the beach that hate everything? Eww! Is this some sort of hip music that I don't understand?"

== Music video ==
The music video for the song was directed by Thomas Mignone and features Ugly Kid Joe playing on a beach in Isla Vista, California. The video features inflatable blow up sex dolls. A sheepdog appears in multiple scenes running around with another dog. The dogs urinated on Mark Davis' drum set. The music video is the last appearance of the band's rhythm guitarist Roger Lahr before leaving Ugly Kid Joe.

== Reception ==
The song found its greatest success in the United Kingdom, where it reached number three in May 1992, and it also reached number nine on the Billboard Hot 100 in the United States. It additionally reached the top 10 in Belgium, Ireland, the Netherlands and Norway and peaked within the top 20 in Germany, Sweden and Switzerland. The single also charted in Australia as part of the As Ugly as They Wanna Be EP, reaching number four and earning a Platinum certification from the Australian Recording Industry Association for shipments exceeding 70,000. Rolling Stone magazine placed this song and its follow up "Cats in the Cradle" on their list of the "20 Greatest Two-Hit Wonders of All Time", saying for "Everything About You", "this California group straddled the line between the hard-rock hookiness that was waning in popularity in Nirvana's Nineties and more au courant alt-rock surliness on their debut single". AllMusic reviewer Heather Phares, reacted to the song negatively, and called it a "hair metal snark-fest".

== Track listings ==
- 7-inch single

A. "Everything About You" (clean edit) — 4:06
B. "Whiplash Liquor" — 3:40

- UK and European CD single
1. "Everything About You" (clean edit) — 4:06
2. "Whiplash Liquor" — 3:40
3. "Sin City" (AC/DC cover recorded live at the Carnaval, Santa Barbara) — 5:05
4. "Everything about You" (dirty version) — 4:14

== Charts ==
=== Weekly charts ===
Chart (1992)	Peak position
Australia (ARIA) As Ugly as They Wanna Be EP	4
Belgium (Ultratop 50 Flanders)	8
Canada Top Singles (RPM)	37
Europe (Eurochart Hot 100)	9
France (SNEP)	25
Germany (GfK)	11
Ireland (IRMA)	5
Netherlands (Dutch Top 40)	5
Netherlands (Single Top 100)	6
Norway (VG-lista)	5
Sweden (Sverigetopplistan)	15
Switzerland (Schweizer Hitparade)	14
UK Singles (Official Charts)	3
UK Airplay (Music Week)	10
US Billboard Hot 100	9
US Mainstream Rock (Billboard)	6

=== Year-end charts ===
Chart (1992)	Position
Australia (ARIA)	13
Belgium (Ultratop)	96
Europe (Eurochart Hot 100)	63
Germany (Media Control)	59
Netherlands (Dutch Top 40)	47
Netherlands (Single Top 100)	50
Sweden (Topplistan)	89
UK Singles (OCC)	39
US Billboard Hot 100	72
US Album Rock Tracks (Billboard)	25

== Certifications ==
Region	Certification	Certified units/sales
Australia (ARIA)	Platinum	70,000^{^}
^{^} Shipments figures based on certification alone.

== Release history ==
Region	Version	Date	Format(s)	Label(s)	Ref.
United States	"Everything About You"	March 19, 1992	7-inch vinyl; cassette	Mercury	
Australia	As Ugly as They Wanna Be EP	April 6, 1992	CD; cassette	Stardog	
United Kingdom	"Everything About You"	May 4, 1992	7-inch vinyl; 12-inch vinyl; CD; cassette	Mercury	
Japan	"Everything About You"	August 31, 1992	Mini-CD	Mercury	
