= Nativity in Black: A Tribute to Black Sabbath =

Black Sabbath tribute albums

Nativity in Black: A Tribute to Black Sabbath is a series of two Black Sabbath tribute albums, released in 1994 and 2000 respectively. The albums feature various heavy metal groups performing cover versions of Black Sabbath songs in tribute to the band.

== Information ==
All of the tracks featured on the Nativity in Black albums cover material strictly from the band's 1970s heyday with vocalist Ozzy Osbourne. The title is derived from a widespread yet incorrect assumption surrounding the title of the Black Sabbath song "N.I.B.".

The band Bullring Brummies featured Black Sabbath founding members Geezer Butler and Bill Ward, along with vocalist Rob Halford, Obsessed/Saint Vitus guitarist Scott "Wino" Weinrich, and Fight guitarist Brian Tilse. Their cover of "The Wizard" on the first album is their only official recording, with the musicians coming together specifically for this recording.

The live recording of "War Pigs" by Faith No More was previously included on the band's live album, Live at the Brixton Academy.

1000 Homo DJs' version of "Supernaut" was originally released as a 12" single in 1990.

Pantera was originally supposed to appear on the first album with their recording of "Planet Caravan" but was left off. Instead, that song appeared on their 1994 release Far Beyond Driven.

Biohazard was featured in a music video for the song "After Forever" which was directed by Parris Mayhew of Cro-Mags and produced by Drew Stone.

The album was certified Gold by the RIAA on 4 December 2000. Bob Chiappardi of Concrete Marketing was executive producer for the album. Megadeth's cover of "Paranoid" received a Grammy nomination in 1995 for 'Best Metal Performance'. This track also famously ends with drummer Nick Menza not stopping at the end of the song and Dave Mustaine yelling at him until he does.

== Nativity in Black ==
Nativity in Black

Compilation album by various artists
- Released: October 4, 1994
- Genre: Heavy metal
- Length: 67:42
- Labels: Columbia; Sony
- Producers: Bob Chiappardi; Ross Elliott

Professional ratings
Review scores
| Source | Rating |
|---|---|
| AllMusic | 3/5 stars |

All tracks are written by Ozzy Osbourne, Tony Iommi, Geezer Butler and Bill Ward.

Nativity in Black track listing
| No. | Title | Artist | Length |
|---|---|---|---|
| 1. | "After Forever" (originally released on Master of Reality) | Biohazard | 5:46 |
| 2. | "Children of the Grave" (originally released on Master of Reality) | White Zombie | 5:50 |
| 3. | "Paranoid" (originally released on Paranoid) | Megadeth | 2:32 |
| 4. | "Supernaut" (originally released on Black Sabbath, Vol. 4) | 1000 Homo DJs with Al Jourgensen | 6:39 |
| 5. | "Iron Man" (originally released on Paranoid) | Ozzy Osbourne with Therapy? | 5:26 |
| 6. | "Lord of This World" (originally released on Master of Reality) | Corrosion of Conformity | 6:25 |
| 7. | "Symptom of the Universe" (originally released on Sabotage) | Sepultura | 4:15 |
| 8. | "The Wizard" (originally released on Black Sabbath) | Bullring Brummies with Geezer Butler and Rob Halford | 5:01 |
| 9. | "Sabbath Bloody Sabbath" (originally released on Sabbath Bloody Sabbath) | Bruce Dickinson with Godspeed | 5:36 |
| 10. | "N.I.B." (originally released on Black Sabbath) | Ugly Kid Joe | 5:28 |
| 11. | "War Pigs (Live)" (originally released on Paranoid) | Faith No More | 7:02 |
| 12. | "Black Sabbath" (originally released on Black Sabbath) | Type O Negative | 7:45 |
| Total length: | | | 67:42 |

European bonus track
| No. | Title | Artist | Length |
|---|---|---|---|
| 13. | "Solitude" (originally released on Master of Reality) | Cathedral | 4:52 |

Japanese version bonus tracks
| No. | Title | Artist | Length |
|---|---|---|---|
| 13. | "St.Vitus Dance" (originally released on Black Sabbath, Vol. 4) | Cathedral | 4:52 |
| 14. | "Wheels of Confusion" (originally released on Black Sabbath, Vol. 4) | Cathedral | 5:31 |

== Nativity in Black II ==
Nativity in Black II

Compilation album by various artists
- Released: June 6, 2000
- Genres: Heavy metal, nu metal
- Length: 65:12
- Labels: Priority, Virgin

Professional ratings
Review scores
| Source | Rating |
|---|---|
| AllMusic | 3/5 stars |
| NY Rock | (positive) |

Nativity in Black II track listing
| No. | Title | Artist | Length |
|---|---|---|---|
| 1. | "Sweet Leaf" (originally released on Master of Reality) | Godsmack | 4:54 |
| 2. | "Hole in the Sky" (originally released on Sabotage) | Machine Head | 3:32 |
| 3. | "Behind the Wall of Sleep" (originally released on Black Sabbath) | Static-X | 3:31 |
| 4. | "Never Say Die" (originally released on Never Say Die!) | Megadeth | 3:46 |
| 5. | "Snowblind" (originally released on Black Sabbath, Vol. 4) | System of a Down | 4:40 |
| 6. | "Electric Funeral" (originally released on Paranoid) | Pantera | 5:53 |
| 7. | "N.I.B." (originally released on Black Sabbath) | Primus with Ozzy Osbourne | 5:57 |
| 8. | "Hand of Doom" (originally released on Paranoid) | Slayer | 5:15 |
| 9. | "Under the Sun" (originally released on Black Sabbath, Vol. 4) | Soulfly | 5:45 |
| 10. | "Sabbra Cadabra" (originally released on Sabbath Bloody Sabbath) | Hed PE | 3:12 |
| 11. | "Into the Void" (originally released on Master of Reality) | Monster Magnet | 8:03 |
| 12. | "Iron Man (This Means War)" (originally released on Paranoid) | Busta Rhymes (featuring Ozzy Osbourne) | 4:38 |
