= N.I.B. =

Song by Black Sabbath

Song by Black Sabbath

from the album Black Sabbath
- Released: 13 February 1970
- Studio: Regent Sounds (London)
- Genre: Heavy metal
- Length: 6:07
- Label: Vertigo
- Songwriters: Geezer Butler; Tony Iommi; Ozzy Osbourne; Bill Ward
- Producer: Rodger Bain

Audio sample
- file; help

"N.I.B." is a song released by English heavy metal band Black Sabbath. It first appeared as the fourth track on the band's self-titled debut album. The lyrics are in the first person from the point of view of Lucifer. Bassist Geezer Butler, who composed the song's lyrics, has said that "the song was about the devil falling in love and totally changing, becoming a good person."

== Title ==
The song's title has long been a source of speculation, with some fans over the years interpreting the title as meaning "Nativity in Black" or "Name in Blood". In the early 1990s, Geezer Butler claimed that the title was a reference to drummer Bill Ward's beard at that time, which his bandmates felt looked like a pen nib. According to Butler, "Originally (the title) was Nib, which was Bill's beard. When I wrote N.I.B., I couldn't think of a title for the song, so I just called it Nib, after Bill's beard. To make it more intriguing I put punctuation marks in there to make it N.I.B. By the time it got to America, they translated it to 'Nativity in Black'."

Though "Nativity in Black" is a semi-unofficial title, it was later used for a pair of Black Sabbath tribute albums released in 1994 and 2000 respectively.

== Cover versions and other uses ==
Ugly Kid Joe recorded their cover of "N.I.B." for the Nativity in Black tribute album, followed by Ozzy Osbourne and Primus on Nativity in Black II; the latter cover peaked at No. 2 on Billboard's Hot Mainstream Rock Tracks chart in October 2000. This version also appears in Osbourne's 2005 boxed set Prince of Darkness. Storm Large also covered it for her 2014 album Le Bonheur.

A track titled "Naïveté in Black" written by Geezer Butler appeared on the Black Sabbath album 13.

== Certifications ==
Certifications for "N.I.B."
Region	Certification	Certified units/sales
New Zealand (RMNZ)	Gold	15,000^{‡}
^{‡} Sales+streaming figures based on certification alone.
