= Sweet Leaf =

1971 song by Black Sabbath

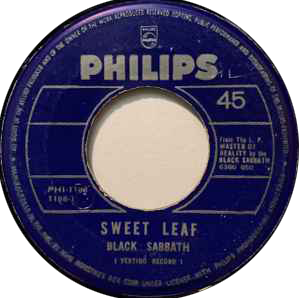

Song by Black Sabbath

from the album Master of Reality
- B-side: "After Forever"
- Released: 6 August 1971
- Recorded: 1971
- Studio: Record Plant, Los Angeles
- Genre: Stoner metal
- Length: 5:05
- Label: Vertigo (UK); Warner Bros. Records (US); Philips (PH)
- Songwriters: Ozzy Osbourne, Tony Iommi, Geezer Butler, Bill Ward
- Producer: Rodger Bain

"Sweet Leaf" is a song by the English heavy metal band Black Sabbath from their third album Master of Reality, released in August 1971. The song was released as a single in the Philippines and was later included on their 1976 greatest hits compilation We Sold Our Soul for Rock 'n' Roll. A Rolling Stone reader's poll listed it as one of the band's best songs.

== Background and recording ==
The song begins with a tape loop of guitarist Tony Iommi coughing from a joint he was smoking with bandmate Ozzy Osbourne, which Revolver called "maybe the most epic smoke sesh in the history of epic metal smoke seshes." The song's subject is cannabis, which the band was using frequently at that time; the band was under the influence of marijuana while recording the track. Bassist Geezer Butler recalls coming up with the song title while opening a pack of Sweet Afton cigarettes he got from Dublin and seeing "The Sweetest Leaf You Can Buy!" on the lid.

== Legacy ==
"Sweet Leaf" and the Master of Reality album as a whole are a primary influence on the emergence of stoner rock and stoner metal. A compilation album of covers of Black Sabbath songs by stoner rock bands, also titled Sweet Leaf, was released by Deadline Music in 2015.

Billy Corgan has cited the significance of "Sweet Leaf" as an influence on the sound of The Smashing Pumpkins, noting that he first heard the song from his uncle's copy of Master of Reality when he was 8 years old and thought "this is what God sounds like".

== Samples and covers ==
The main guitar riff, paired with a loop of a drum sample from Led Zeppelin's "When the Levee Breaks", is the instrumental basis of the Beastie Boys' song "Rhymin & Stealin", the first track on their 1986 debut album Licensed to Ill.

The Butthole Surfers reworked the song as "Sweat Loaf" on Locust Abortion Technician.

The Red Hot Chili Peppers play the riff as the outro to their hit song "Give It Away" (1991).

Anthrax plays the riff as the outro to their cover of another Black Sabbath song, "Sabbath Bloody Sabbath" on the album I'm the Man (1987).
