= Dave Fortman =

American record producer and guitarist

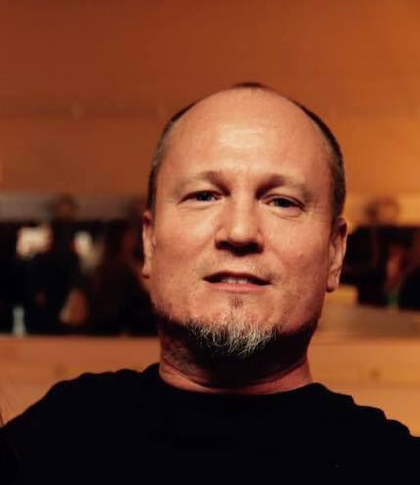
- Fortman in 2016

Background information
- Born: July 11, 1967 (age 59); Orlando, Florida, U.S.
- Genres: Hard rock; alternative rock; alternative metal; heavy metal
- Occupations: Record producer; musician
- Instrument: Guitar
- Years active: 1989–present
- Member of: Ugly Kid Joe
- Website: davefortman.com

Dave Fortman (born July 11, 1967) is an American record producer and musician. He is the guitarist for rock band Ugly Kid Joe, and has done production work for bands such as Godsmack, Superjoint Ritual, Snot, Atomship, Eyehategod, Mudvayne, Otep, Slipknot, Simple Plan and Evanescence.

== Early years ==
Fortman was born in Orlando, Florida. His mother Marge Ann Singleton Fortman was a kindergarten teacher and his father Jon Richey Fortman a retired biology professor. In Covington, Louisiana, he was a trumpet player in marching band for junior high school. He joined with two other musicians John Licali and John McNeely in 1984 to form the band SX while in high school. In 1990, the band relocated to Los Angeles to search for a record deal leading to Fortman joining the band Sugartooth in the same year.

Through Sugartooth's lawyer Dennis Rider who was then Ugly Kid Joe's manager, Fortman met Ugly Kid Joe frontman Whitfield Crane and guitarist Klaus Eichstadt.

== Ugly Kid Joe ==
Fortman joined Ugly Kid Joe in 1992 replacing Roger Lahr, and played guitar on their multi-platinum-selling album America's Least Wanted. He also wrote the song "Busy Bee". Fortman played and wrote with Ugly Kid Joe until their demise in 1997, including multiple songwriting credits on the albums Menace to Sobriety and Motel California.

After the band reformed in 2011, Fortman played guitar and produced their most recent EP Stairway to Hell in 2012 as well as their full-length album Uglier Than They Used ta Be in 2015.

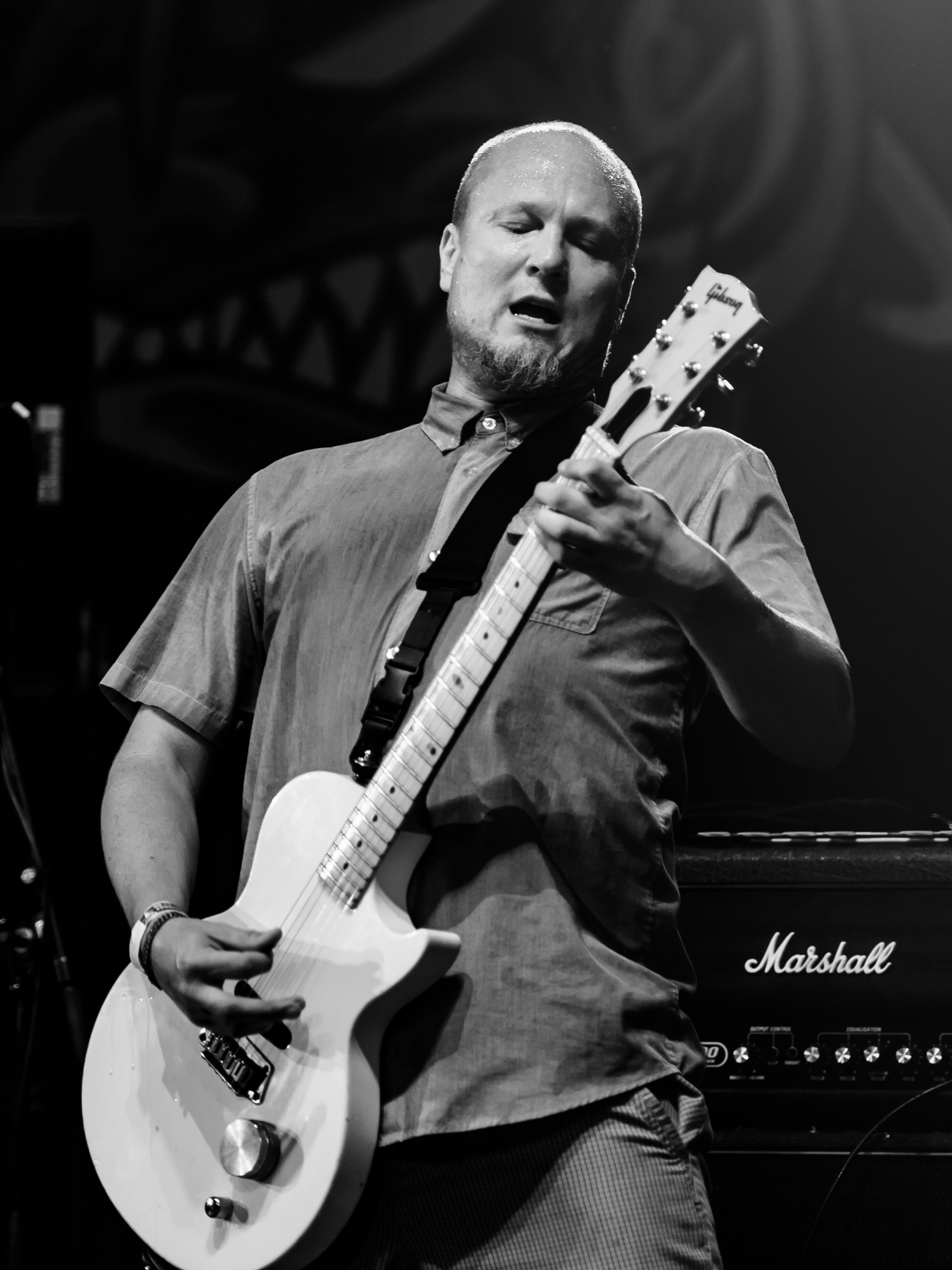
Fortman with Ugly Kid Joe at Wacken Open Air 2017

In the summer of 2017, Fortman rejoined Ugly Kid Joe on the road for their European tour for the first time since 1997. During the tour, he performed with Amy Lee of Evanescence on stage at Graspop in Belgium when she sang "Cats in the Cradle" with the band. He toured with Ugly Kid Joe on their tour of Australia in December 2017 and an "Americas Least Wanted Anniversary tour" in Europe in April 2018.

== Production career ==
Following the demise of Ugly Kid Joe in 1997, Fortman relocated back to Covington, Louisiana to start a small recording studio with longtime friend Gene Joanen called Balance Studios. Some of his early recording and productions included Phil Anselmo's Superjoint Ritual, Crowbar and Soilent Green. In 2001, Fortman recorded a demo for a local band 12 Stones. The demo quickly got recognition and eventually led to a record deal with Wind-up Records. Wind-up hired Jay Baumgardner and Fortman to co-produce their debut album. In 2002, Wind-up's owners Alan and Diana Meltzer hired Fortman to produce Evanescence, a then-unknown band from Little Rock, Arkansas.

In March 2003, Evanescence's album Fallen was released and went on to sell 17 million copies worldwide with four Grammy nominations, including Song of the Year for "Bring Me to Life" and Record of the Year. The album has been certified platinum in 33 countries. In the summer of 2004, Fortman produced Mudvayne's Lost and Found which debuted at number 2 on the Billboard charts and sold over 1 million copies. It is the band's most successful album to date. Later that same year, he went into the studio with Amy Lee to make the second Evanescence record The Open Door. The album was released in 2006 and debuted at number 1 in the US, Australia, Germany, Greece, and Switzerland and went on to sell more than 7 million copies worldwide.

In late 2007, Fortman was hired to produce Slipknot's All Hope Is Gone, which upon its release in 2009 spawned five singles, including "Snuff" and "Psychosocial". The album went on to sell over 1 million copies in the US and over 2 million worldwide. In late 2009, Fortman was reunited with Ugly Kid Joe drummer Shannon Larkin, now drummer of Godsmack, when he was hired to produce Godsmack's record The Oracle. The album was certified gold in 2011.

Fortman reunited with Godsmack in 2014 for the follow-up album 1000 HP as well as producing vocals and mixing Godsmack frontman Sully Erna's solo album entitled Hometown Life in 2016.

== Discography ==
=== Ugly Kid Joe ===
- America's Least Wanted (1992)
- Menace to Sobriety (1995)
- Motel California (1996)
- Uglier Than They Used ta Be (2015)
- Rad Wings of Destiny (2022)

=== As producer (selection) ===
Year	Artist	Album	Role(s)
2001	Crowbar	Sonic Excess in Its Purest Form	producer, mixing
2002	12 Stones	12 Stones	co-producer
2003	Evanescence	Fallen	producer, mixing
2003	BoySetsFire	Tomorrow Come Today	producer
2004	Atomship	The Crash of '47	producer, mixing
2004	12 Stones	Potter's Field	producer, mixing
2005	Mudvayne	Lost and Found	producer, mixing
2006	Evanescence	The Open Door	producer, mixing
2008	Simple Plan	Simple Plan	producer, engineer
2008	Slipknot	All Hope Is Gone	producer
2008	Mudvayne	The New Game	producer, mixing
2009	Mudvayne	Mudvayne	producer, mixing
2010	Godsmack	The Oracle	producer, mixing
2014	Godsmack	1000HP	producer, mixing
2016	Sully Erna	Hometown Life	mixing
2017	12 Stones	Picture Perfect	producer
2023	Godsmack	Lighting Up the Sky	mixing
