= Ugly Kid Joe =

American rock band

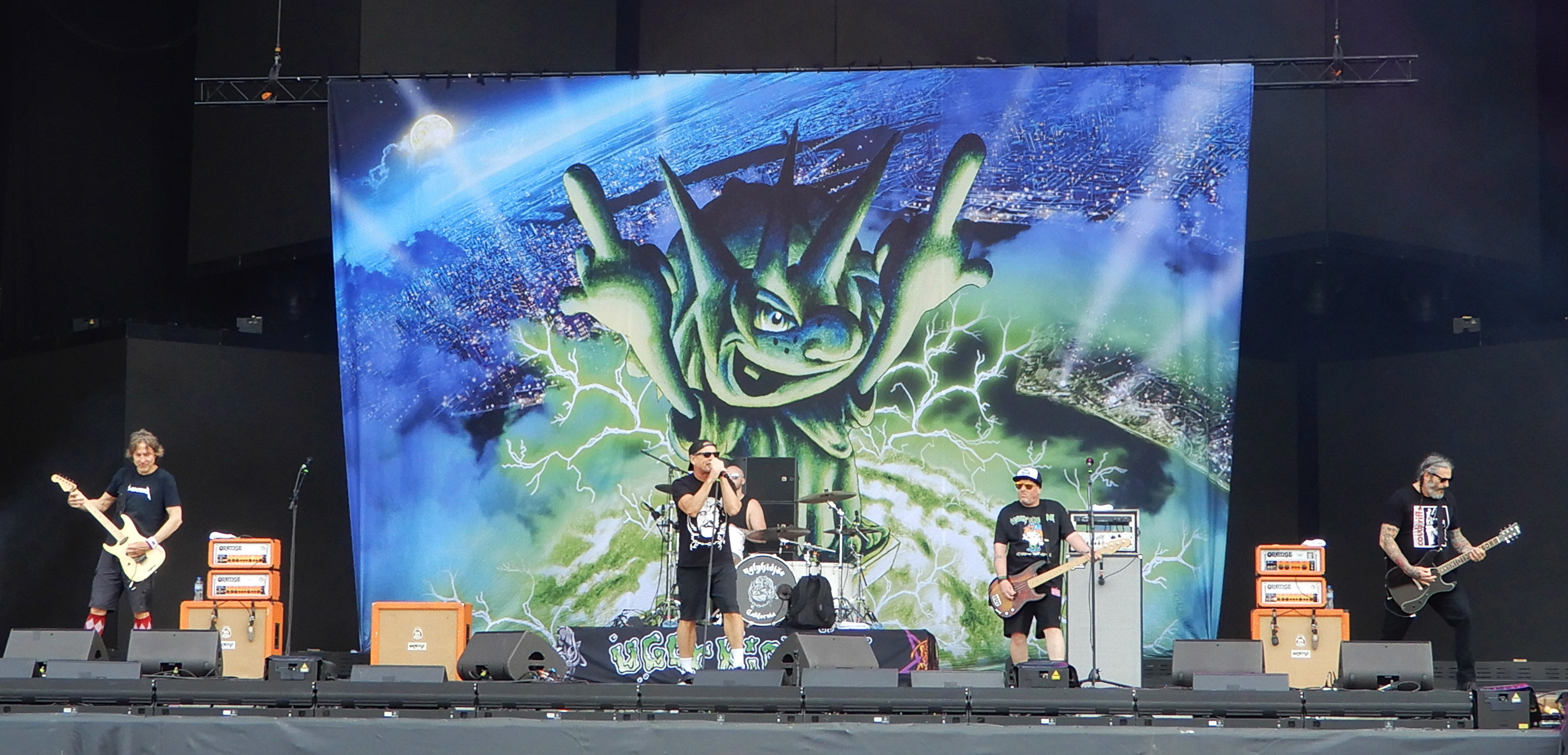
- Ugly Kid Joe at Hellfest 2022

Background information
- Also known as: Overdrive; Suburban White Alcoholic Trash
- Origin: Isla Vista, California, U.S.
- Genres: Hard rock; heavy metal; alternative metal; funk metal
- Years active: 1989–1997; 2010–present
- Labels: Mercury; Evilution; Metalville; UKJ Records
- Members: Whitfield Crane; Klaus Eichstadt; Cordell Crockett; Dave Fortman; Shannon Larkin
- Past members: Eric Phillips; Roger Lahr; Phil Hilgaertner; Jonathan Spaulding; Mark Davis; Bob Fernandez; Zac Morris
- Website: uglykidjoe.net

Ugly Kid Joe (often abbreviated as UKJ) is an American hard rock band from Isla Vista, California, formed in 1989. The band's name spoofs the glam metal band Pretty Boy Floyd's name.

To date, Ugly Kid Joe have released five full-length albums, two compilation albums and two EPs. Their best selling records are As Ugly as They Wanna Be (1991) and America's Least Wanted (1992), which were both certified double platinum by the RIAA; the former is notable for being the first EP to go platinum. The band broke up in 1997, but announced a reunion in 2010 and subsequently recommenced activity.

== History ==
=== Early history (1989–1991) ===
Childhood friends Whitfield Crane and Klaus Eichstadt took an interest in music while growing up in Palo Alto, California. In 1989 Dane Lambert and Eichstadt joined Crane's band in Isla Vista, California, and the trio recorded a demo with another Palo Alto native, record producer Eric Valentine. After several band member changes, the band signed with Mercury Records in 1991. By this time the As Ugly as They Wanna Be line-up was formed; consisting of Crane, Eichstadt, Mark Davis, Roger Lahr, and Cordell Crockett.

Initially named Overdrive, then Suburban White Alcoholic Trash, the band got its name Ugly Kid Joe as a parody of L.A. glam band Pretty Boy Floyd, initially for a one night show in Santa Barbara opening for Pretty Boy Floyd. Pretty Boy Floyd would pull out of the show and have the gig cancelled, but the band decided to keep the name.

The band became popular in the early 1990s, mixing satirical humor and heavy metal. Its logo was a cartoon embodiment of an "ugly kid" wearing a backwards baseball hat and giving the finger. Heavily influenced by Black Sabbath, Ugly Kid Joe covered several of the veteran band's songs, including "Sweet Leaf" and "N.I.B." The group toured the United States several times, making its second tour in support of Scatterbrain, and later opening for former Black Sabbath lead vocalist Ozzy Osbourne.

The band released the EP As Ugly as They Wanna Be in October 1991, garnering success in 1992 with the single "Everything About You", which peaked at No. 3 in the UK Singles Chart and made it into the Billboard Top 10. Later in the year, the song would be used in the movie Wayne's World. As Ugly As They Wanna Be went on to sell over one million copies in the U.S. alone.

=== Commercial success (1992–1996) ===
The band spent two months in the studio to record America's Least Wanted. During the process, Roger Lahr left the band due to musical differences and was eventually replaced by Sugartooth guitarist Dave Fortman in April 1992. Lahr is credited in the song "Come Tomorrow" and is included in the album's liner notes, as the band thanked him for spending his time with them. Rob Halford of Judas Priest was a guest vocalist on the song "Goddamn Devil". The band sped up the recording process for their album in order to get a spot as a supporting act for Ozzy Osbourne's "No More Tears" tour. The band eventually landed a spot for the tour, only to have Crane fly back to L.A. several times to finish edits on the album. The album caused controversy with its cover, which features the band's mascot posing as the Statue of Liberty holding up the middle finger and holding a porno magazine in his hand instead of the Declaration. As some stores would not carry the album due to the cover image, the band decided to have an alternative cover made using the album's back photo, which featured the band's mascot chained and gagged.

America's Least Wanted appeared on the U.S. charts at No. 27 having sold over 600,000 units upon release and was considered a favorite among fans and critics. One critic praised the album as, "A rock record you can play all day." The album achieved Gold status in both Canada and Australia, Silver status in the United Kingdom, and went Platinum in the U.S. A cover of Harry Chapin's "Cat's in the Cradle" was subsequently released as a well-received single that sold over 500,000 copies in the United States alone and peaked at No. 7 in the UK Singles Chart.

After finishing up with Ozzy, they opened up for Def Leppard on the European leg of their tour which was sold-out in 6 weeks. Ugly Kid Joe then made a stop at the 1992 MTV Video Music Awards and thereafter spent 3 weeks playing sold-out shows in Australia and Japan. They became the Reader's Choice for Best New Artist voted by Metal Edge and Raw magazine. They also presented The Favorite Heavy Metal band award to Metallica at the American Music Awards in 1993. The band would also get nominated for Favorite Heavy Metal/Hard Rock New Artist but lost to Pearl Jam.

After their tour in support of their 1992 album America's Least Wanted, the band searched for a replacement drummer, as Mark Davis left to pursue a life away from the spotlight. The band tried out several new drummers, for example Bob Fernandez, who only recorded once, on a cover of Black Sabbath's "N.I.B." for the Nativity in Black Black Sabbath tribute album. He also performed in Brazil with the band at the Hollywood Rock festival in 1994 as headliners along with Aerosmith, Poison, among others. After attending a Souls at Zero show in Colorado, Crane became immediately impressed with the band's drummer, Shannon Larkin. Crane later called up Larkin to join Ugly Kid Joe to which Larkin agreed. The band then wrote some new song material with Larkin and embarked on a short tour titled the "Excuse To Go Snowboarding Tour" with guests Dog Eat Dog and Goldfinger. Larkin's contributions led to a grittier sound for the second album Menace to Sobriety, released in the summer of 1995. The album was recorded in Palacio Del Rio in northern Santa Barbara.

The band embarked on a tour in support of the album. They did a snowboard tour, a small club tour, and later a stadium tour opening for Bon Jovi and Van Halen. The band excluded "Everything About You" from their set list in order to show the fans that they stand tall on their recent material. At a show in Wembley Stadium in London, the band was joined on stage by Ozzy Osbourne's son, Jack Osbourne before playing Sabbath's "N.I.B".

Menace to Sobriety received much praise from the press and fans, and UK rock magazine Kerrang! ranked it as a contender for album of the year. Despite success overseas and a successful European tour, the album was given little encouragement from Mercury Records and subsequently failed in the United States.

After being dropped by Mercury, Ugly Kid Joe formed its own independent label, Evilution Records, for the release of the band's next album. With distribution support from Castle Communications, Motel California was released in late 1996, and again the band toured Europe to smaller crowds. The tour was named "Late Check-out Tour", underlining the band's characteristic sense of humor. Motel California, an album lead vocalist Whitfield Crane described as "heavy, funky, and has everything in it", initially received lukewarm reviews and sold poorly, though it has gained a minor cult following in recent times.

=== Break-up and aftermath (1997–2009) ===
Ugly Kid Joe disbanded in 1997. Drummer Shannon Larkin has been a member of Godsmack since 2002, while lead vocalist Whitfield Crane took the then-vacant vocalist spot for New York City rock band Life of Agony whose former singer Keith Caputo had left the group in 1997. After his quick departure from Life of Agony, Crane collaborated with some Soulfly members on a new project called Medication (1999–2003) and Godsmack members on Another Animal (2006–2009).

In 2005, an unreleased video for "Bicycle Wheels" was made public onto the Ugly Kid Joe forum site (created in January 2004 by J.Goldman, aka DMJ). In 2007, an official Myspace page was made of the band, with old photographs of the band and other candid pictures along with promotional artwork and uploaded live footage and another unreleased music video for "Sandwich". Some of the other footage included footage of the band playing at the UC Santa Barbara campus before getting signed. Soon videos were appearing on YouTube by fans. Some even included live recordings of them in concert and television recordings. Meanwhile, the band's main page featured live tracks and rare songs including a demo of "C.U.S.T." and a few tracks from Motel California and Menace to Sobriety.

=== Reunion (2010–present) ===
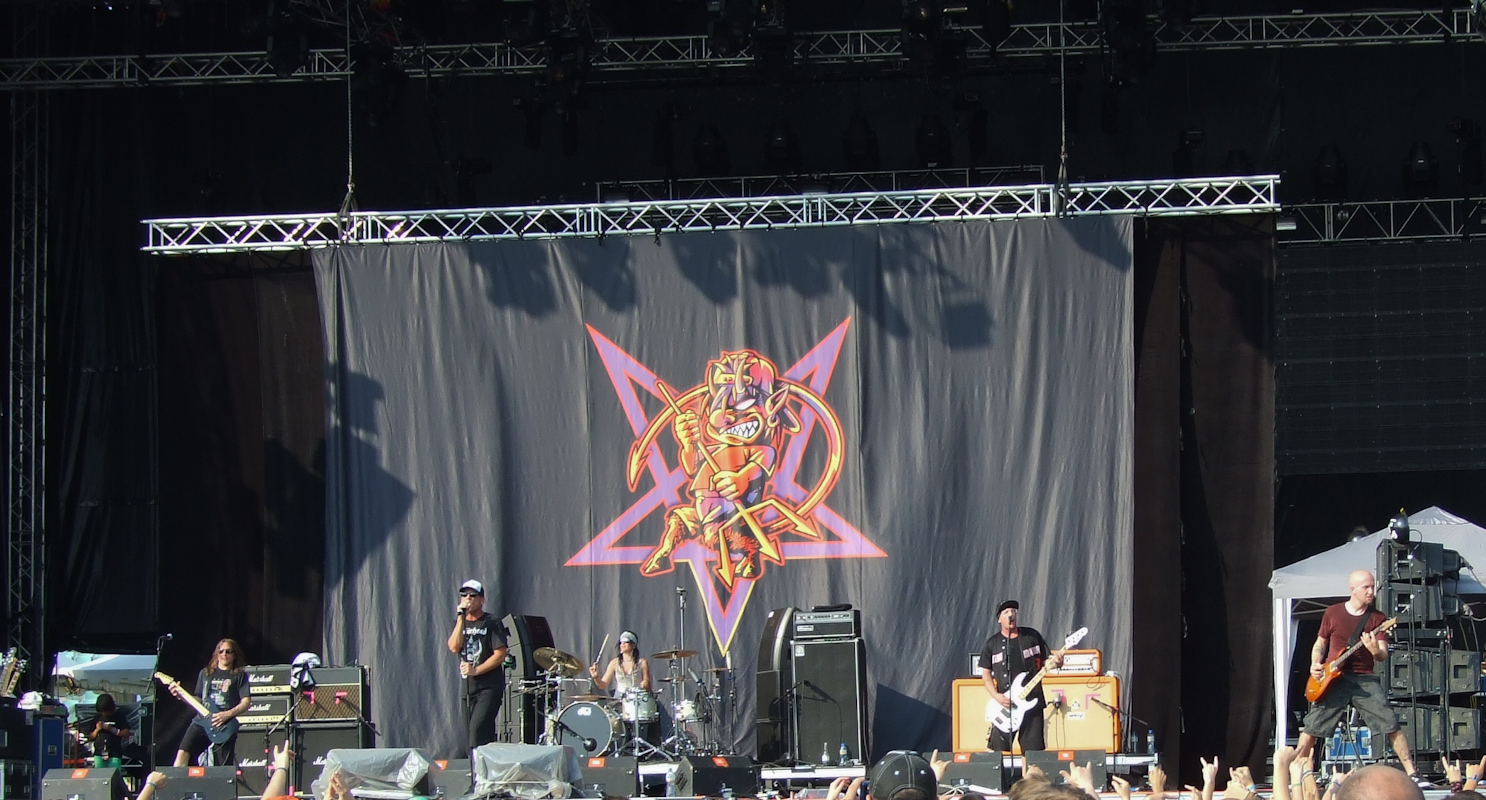
Ugly Kid Joe at Sofia Rocks Fest 2012

Klaus Eichstadt stated in the December 2009 issue of the German edition of the music magazine Metal Hammer, that the members of Ugly Kid Joe were planning to reunite in summer 2010, although did not specify whether their intent was to produce a new album or simply to perform together. However, rumors of a reunion were confirmed on their MySpace page on May 27, 2010. Their MySpace page also says that the reunion lineup would be the same as the last one before their breakup.

In July 2011, according to drummer Shannon Larkin, a new album had been completed. He revealed the album's status in an interview with California's 107.7 The Bone at the Mayhem Festival, saying "It's a fun band – it's funny, you listen to the songs and it makes you laugh. Just a good-time rock band, y'know?"

On September 9, 2011, vocalist Whitfield Crane made an update on the band's official Facebook page stating he appeared 107.7 The Bone the day before and played a new track called "Love Ain't True" and stating that a 6 track EP and was mixed and finished. According to official website "also in the works is an EPK documenting the reunification and the latest recording sessions along with some rare old footage of interviews, behind the scenes stuff, and live performances".

The new EP, Stairway to Hell, was released digitally on June 5, 2012, while a physical version surfaced a month later, July 9. In order to promote the recording, Ugly Kid Joe played a series of festivals that summer, including Sweden Rock in Sweden, Download in England, Gods of Metal in Milan, Italy, and Belgrade Calling in Serbia. They were the main support act for Guns N' Roses in Tel Aviv, Israel on July 3, 2012, and also for Alice Cooper on his "Raise The Dead" tour in October 2012.

Ugly Kid Joe started a joint co-headlining European tour with Skid Row in October 2013 kicking off the tour in Southampton, UK.

In February 2015, Ugly Kid Joe successfully used pledgemusic.com in a crowdfunding effort to pay for the recording of their next album, to be titled Uglier Than They Used ta Be, is the first full-length studio album since they break-up after the album was completed in nearly 19 years, which was released on October 16, 2015.

Throughout 2017 and 2018, the band toured Europe and Australia in celebration of the bands 25th anniversary where they performed America's Least Wanted in its entirety.

On September 9, 2021, the band played their first show in America in nearly 25 years opening for Judas Priest in Virginia Beach. Ugly Kid Joe's first studio album in seven years, Rad Wings of Destiny, was released on October 21, 2022.

In January 2023, the band announced its first U.S. tour in 27 years the "Rad Wing’s Of Destiny" Tour. The tour includes Fozzy and Pistols at Dawn. The tour lasted till March 2024, with the last leg taking place in Europe. In November 2025, the band supported Life of Agony on the European leg of their Ugly 30th anniversary tour.

Ugly Kid Joe is currently working on a new album, which is tentatively due for release in 2026. During the Summer of that year the band embarked on a U.S. tour.

== Musical style and influences ==
Ugly Kid Joe has been categorized under several genres, including hard rock, pop metal, heavy metal, alternative metal, funk metal, glam metal and grunge. AllMusic described them as a "fun-loving hard rock/funk/alt-metal group" that has a "knack for crafting infectious pop-metal".

The band has cited Judas Priest, Motörhead, Black Sabbath, AC/DC and Van Halen as its major musical influences, though it also cited the likes of Red Hot Chili Peppers and Mötley Crüe for their funky and heavy musical approach, evident in the band's unique esthetic especially on its debut EP As Ugly As They Wanna Be and debut album America's Least Wanted.

== Band members ==
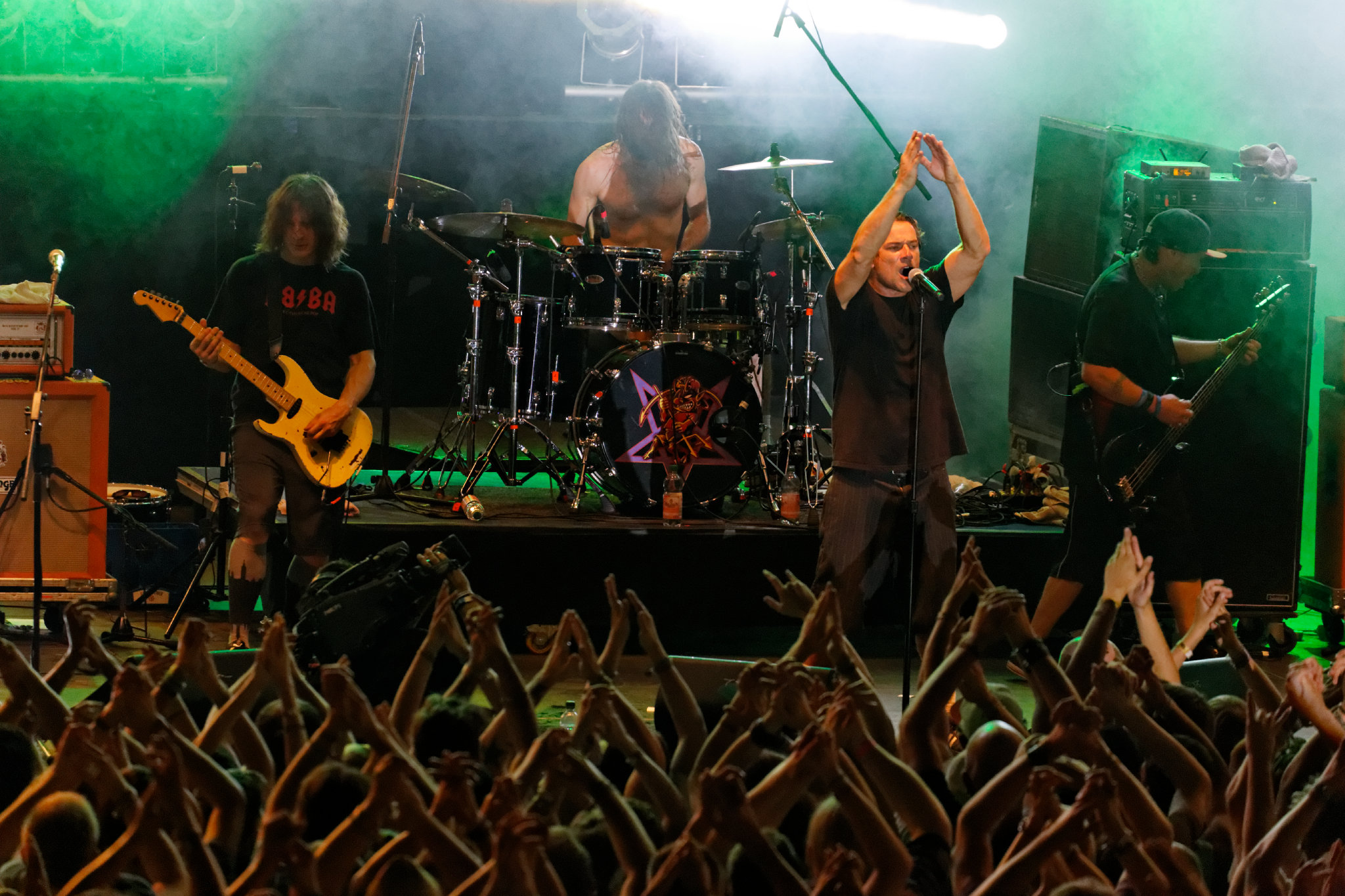
Ugly Kid Joe in 2013

=== Current ===
- Whitfield Crane – lead vocals (1987–1997, 2010–present)
- Klaus Eichstadt – lead guitar, backing vocals (1987–1997, 2010–present)
- Cordell Crockett – bass, backing vocals (1991-1997, 2010–2022)
- Dave Fortman – rhythm guitar, backing vocals (1992–1997, 2010-2023)
- Cam Greenwood – drums (2022-present)

=== Former ===
- Eric Phillips – rhythm guitar, backing vocals (1987–1989)
- Roger Lahr – rhythm guitar, backing vocals (1989–1992)
- Phil Hilgaertner – bass, backing vocals (1987–1991)
- Jonathan Spaulding – drums (1987–1989)
- Mark Davis – drums, percussion (1989–1993)
- Bob Fernandez – drums, percussion (1994)
- Shannon Larkin – drums, percussion (1994–1997, 2010–2021)
- Zac Morris – drums, percussion (2021–2022)

=== Guests ===
- Carrie Hamilton – piano on As Ugly as They Wanna Be (1991 — "Everything About You")
- Stephen Perkins – percussion on America's Least Wanted (1992 — multiple tracks)
- Dean Pleasants – rhythm guitar on America's Least Wanted (1992 — "Same Side")
- Jennifer Barry – backing vocals on America's Least Wanted (1992 — multiple tracks), backing vocals on Menace To Sobriety (1995 — multiple tracks), backing vocals on Motel California (1996 — "Would You Like To Be There")
- Rob Halford – backing vocals on America's Least Wanted (1992 — "Goddamn Devil")
- Julia Sweeney – additional vocals on America's Least Wanted (1992 — "Goddamn Devil", "Everything About You")
- Brad Divens – backing vocals on Menace To Sobriety (1995 — multiple tracks)
- Tom Fletcher – backing vocals on Menace To Sobriety (1995 — multiple tracks)
- Lemmy – backing vocals on Motel California (1996 — "Little Red Man")
- Angus Cooke – cello on Motel California (1996 — "Undertow")
- Tim Wheater – flute on Motel California (1996 — "12 Cents")
- Angelo Moore – saxophone on Stairway to Hell (2012 — "Love Ain't True!")
- "Dirty" Walter A. Kibby II – trumpet on Stairway to Hell (2012 — "Love Ain't True!")
- Sonny Mayo – guitar 2012-2015, appears on Uglier Than They Used Ta Be
- Yael Benzaken – drums (live only) (2012 Summer European Tour)
- Zac Morris – drums 2012-2021, appears on Uglier Than They Used Ta Be and Rad Wings of Destiny
- Chris Catalyst – guitar (live in Europe 2016, live in USA 2023, live in Europe 2025, Live in USA 2026), bass (live in Europe 2022)
- Mike Squires - guitar (live in Europe 2022), bass (live in USA 2023, live in Europe 2025, Live in USA 2026)
- Cameron Greenwood – drums (live in Europe 2022, 2024 and 2025)
- Phil Campbell – guitar on Uglier Than They Used ta Be (2015 – "Under the Bottom", "My Old Man", "Ace of Spades")

=== Lineups ===
1987–1989	Whitfield Crane – lead vocals; Klaus Eichstadt – lead guitar, backing vocals; Eric Phillips – rhythm guitar, music, backing vocals; Phil Hilgaertner – bass guitar, backing vocals; Jon Spaulding – drums, lyrics
1989	Whitfield Crane – lead vocals; Klaus Eichstadt – lead guitar, backing vocals; Roger Lahr – rhythm guitar, backing vocals; Phil Hilgaertner – bass guitar, backing vocals; Mark Davis – drums, percussion
1989–1992	Whitfield Crane – lead vocals; Klaus Eichstadt – lead guitar, backing vocals; Roger Lahr – rhythm guitar, backing vocals; Cordell Crockett – bass guitar, backing vocals; Mark Davis – drums, percussion
1992–1993	Whitfield Crane – lead vocals; Klaus Eichstadt – lead guitar, backing vocals; Dave Fortman – rhythm guitar, backing vocals; Cordell Crockett – bass guitar, backing vocals; Mark Davis – drums, percussion
1994	Whitfield Crane – lead vocals; Klaus Eichstadt – lead guitar, backing vocals; Dave Fortman – rhythm guitar, backing vocals; Cordell Crockett – bass guitar, backing vocals; Bob Fernandez – drums, percussion
1994–1997	Whitfield Crane – lead vocals; Klaus Eichstadt – lead guitar, backing vocals; Dave Fortman – rhythm guitar, backing vocals; Cordell Crockett – bass guitar, backing vocals; Shannon Larkin – drums, percussion
1997–2010	Disbanded
2010–2021	Whitfield Crane – lead vocals; Klaus Eichstadt – lead guitar, backing vocals; Dave Fortman – rhythm guitar, backing vocals; Cordell Crockett – bass guitar, backing vocals; Shannon Larkin – drums, percussion
2021–present	Whitfield Crane– lead vocals; Klaus Eichstadt – lead guitar, backing vocals; Dave Fortman – rhythm guitar, backing vocals; Cordell Crockett – bass guitar, backing vocals; Zac Morris – drums, percussion

== Discography ==
=== Studio albums ===
- America's Least Wanted (1992)
- Menace to Sobriety (1995)
- Motel California (1996)
- Uglier Than They Used ta Be (2015)
- Rad Wings of Destiny (2022)

== See also ==
- List of alternative metal artists
- List of funk metal and funk rock bands
