= Whitfield Crane =

American singer (born 1968)

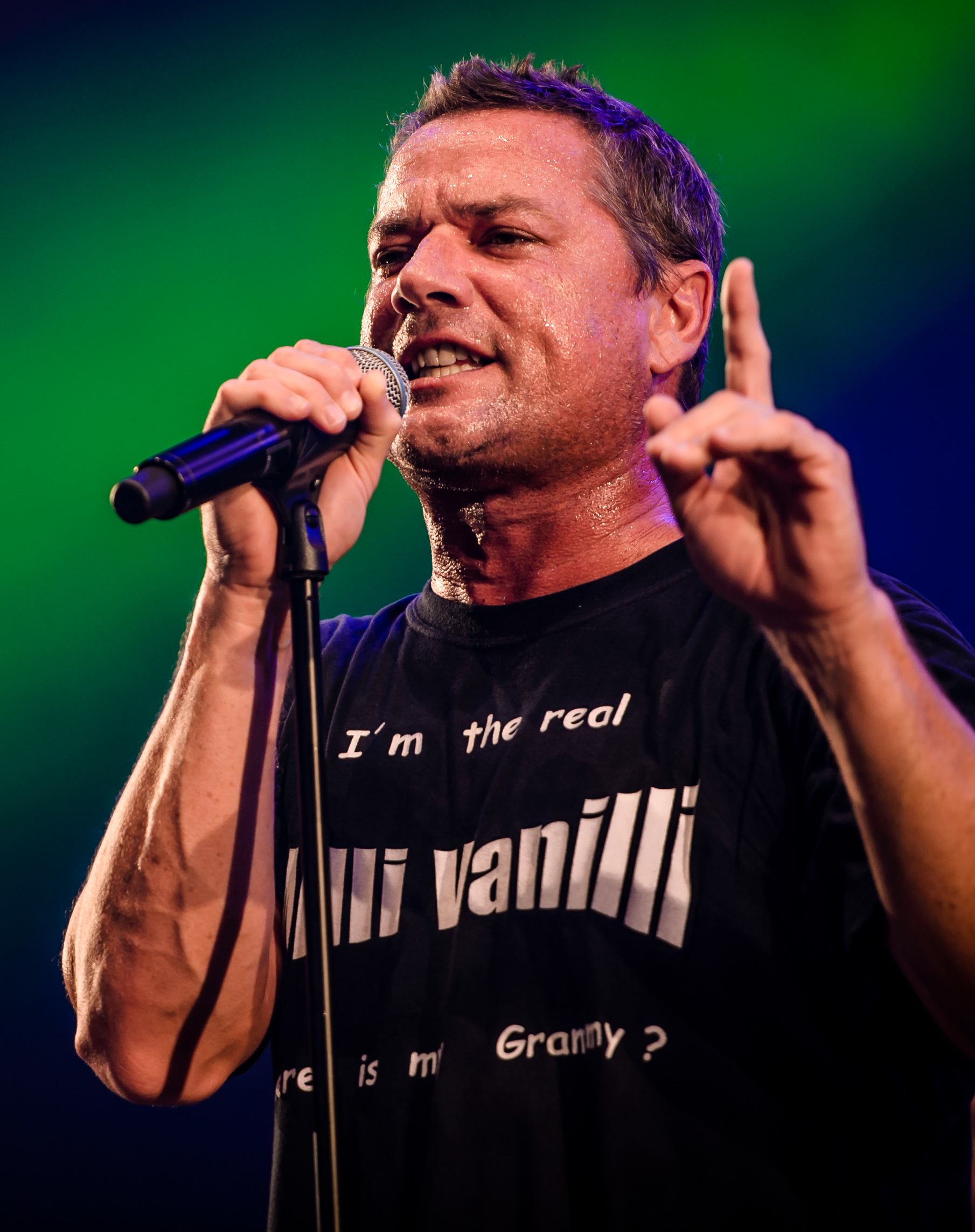
- Crane at the 2017 Wacken Open Air

Background information
- Born: William Whitfield Crane IV; January 19, 1968 (age 58); Palo Alto, California, U.S.
- Genres: Hard rock, heavy metal, alternative metal, alternative rock
- Occupations: Singer, songwriter
- Years active: 1987–present
- Member of: Ugly Kid Joe, Mass Mental
- Formerly of: Medication, Another Animal

William Whitfield Crane IV (born January 19, 1968) is an American singer and founding member and lead vocalist of the rock band Ugly Kid Joe, which was formed in 1989. He has also worked in music outside his band, from performing guest vocals on numerous songs to contributing to musical efforts with other rock bands such as Life of Agony, Another Animal, and Richards/Crane.

== Early life ==
Crane was born on January 19, 1968, in Palo Alto, California. His father left the family when Crane was little. After his father's departure, Crane started to be interested in rock music.

== Career ==
=== Work outside Ugly Kid Joe ===
During Ugly Kid Joe's inactivity, Crane went on a year-long tour with New York hard rock band Life of Agony before forming Medication with ex-Machine Head guitarist Logan Mader. Due to a series of internal issues, Medication disbanded in February 2003.

Over the years, Crane has performed guest vocals on several songs, including "Reaching Out" with Mark McGrath of Sugar Ray (from the Lynn Strait tribute album Strait Up), "Born to Raise Hell" by Motörhead (also featuring rapper Ice-T) and "Voodoo Brother" by Glenn Tipton of Judas Priest.

Crane's filmography includes Ellie Parker, in which he has a cameo appearance as an acting student, and Motörhead's 25 & Alive Boneshaker, where he appears as himself.

In 2006, former Ugly Kid Joe bandmate Shannon Larkin asked Crane to join a side project he formed with members of Godsmack (minus Sully Erna) called Another Animal, as primary vocalist. Crane accepted, and the band released its self-titled debut album in 2007. In support of their debut, the band went out on tour, opening for labelmates Alter Bridge. However, they have suffered poor record sales, and the future of the band is currently unknown.

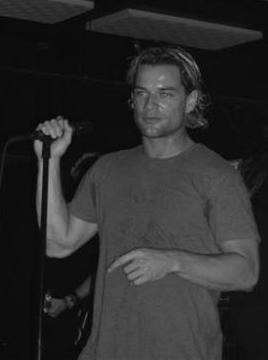
Crane performing in 2002

In 2011, he performed with metal tribute band Hail! in Istanbul, Turkey. He made regular appearances with Motörhead – the last being at the O_{2} Academy Glasgow on November 9, 2012, singing "Killed by Death".

In 2016, Crane collaborated with Lee Richards, formerly of Godsmack, to form a band called Richards/Crane. The band released an album titled World Stands Still.

In July 2025, Crane participated in Back to the Beginning, the final Black Sabbath concert, as part of "Supergroup A" singing "Believer" from Ozzy Osbourne's album Diary of a Madman (album).

=== Orchestra of Doom ===
On July 29, 2016, at the Teatro Ristori Theatre in Verona, Crane unveiled his new classical music project Orchestra of Doom. Fronting the Machivelli 32-piece Orchestra, Crane sang classics by Black Sabbath, Ozzy Osbourne, as well as tracks from Ugly Kid Joe and his acoustic based project Richards/Crane. The Orchestra was conducted by Andrea Battistoni and featured only acoustic instruments.

In June 2019, it was announced that Crane along with executive producer Pat Cash would be bringing Orchestra of Doom to Australia in December for two shows in Melbourne and Sydney. Following the same format, Whitfield will be fronting the 35-piece Philharmonia Orchestra.

=== Possible replacement for Rob Halford in Judas Priest ===
In an August 2019 interview with Metal Rules, Crane said that he was once offered to be the vocalist for Judas Priest while the band was in search for a new vocalist after Rob Halford's departure in 1992. He said that guitarist Glenn Tipton offered him and drummer Shannon Larkin the gig if they wanted it during the recording sessions of Tipton's solo album Baptizm of Fire. Crane explained that he couldn't accept the offer, "because you can't be Rob Halford. You can't be David Lee Roth. It'd be cool, and considering my love for Priest, which is immense, that would have been cool to do it, but not really. It's not a good move. But to jam with Tipton and to know those guys — I mean, those are my fucking heroes. Judas Priest, I mean, fuck. But man, old-school Priest, Jesus, God. So, yeah, I got offered Priest, back in the day. I never said that to anyone."

== 1993 assault charge ==
On August 27, 1993, Crane was arrested and charged with felony assault and inciting violence. The charges came after Crane allegedly urged the crowd to attack security guards during a performance opening for Def Leppard at Cooper Stadium in Columbus, Ohio. Crane is alleged to have screamed "kill the pigs" before jumping on a security guard's back and hitting him with a microphone stand. A few fans near the stage also attacked the guard, who escaped with no serious injury. The case was closed with Crane paying a fine. Crane gave his version of the incident in a 2024 interview with Louder Sound:

“We were playing a baseball stadium in front of forty thousand people. And I used to have a thing where I’d tap the biggest security guard at a show on the shoulder and say: ‘Hey, is it cool if I sit on your shoulders and ride you out into the crowd and high-five some kids?’ But this time the guy took me up, and then threw up me on to the ground. I said: ‘Did you mean to do that?’ And he said: ‘No, sorry. Get up here again…’ And I did, and then he body-slammed me to the ground. And so I threw a mic stand and said some bad things. So then I got arrested."

== Compilation credits ==
- 1994 Born to Raise Hell / Motörhead with Ice-T and Whitfield Crane – Single, Airheads Original Soundtrack
- 1994 N.I.B. / Ugly Kid Joe – Nativity in Black
- 1996 Burnin' Up / Doom Squad – A Tribute to Judas Priest: Legends of Metal
- 1997 Voodoo Brother / Glenn Tipton – Baptizm of Fire
- 1998 Live Wire, Ride On / The Sensational Whitskiteer Band – Thunderbolt: A Tribute to AC/DC
- 2000 Live Wire (Wired Remix) / Remixed to Hell: AC/DC Tribute
- 2000 Reaching Out / Strait Up: A Tribute to Lynn Strait
- 2001 Welcome Home (Sanitarium) / Metallic Assault: A Tribute to Metallica
- 2002 Lord of Thighs / One Way Street: A Tribute to Aerosmith
- 2004 Master of Puppets / Metallic Attack: The Ultimate Tribute
- 2013 Rock 'n' Roll Damnation / Dead City Ruins – Dead City Ruins
- 2013 Killed By Death / Critical Solution – Evil Never Dies
- 2013 Essence / Sight of Emptiness – Instincts
- 2015 Richards/Crane – World Stands Still
- 2015 Steal Away The Night – Randy Rhoads Remembered Volume 1
- 2015 Come On, Come Over / Mass Mental – Jaco (original soundtrack)
- 2017 Cloudy Skies (Ugly Kid Joe – acoustic cover) – Tim McMillan – Hiraeth
- 2018 Yellowcake – Yellowcake (EP)
- 2018 Children of Disease / Leader of Down – Cascade into Chaos
- 2019 Dancing Dogs (Love Survives) / Phil Campbell – Old Lions Still Roar
- 2021 Twenty Four Hours / Molybaron - The Mutiny
