= List of cover versions of U2 songs =

This list shows cover versions of songs originally by the Irish rock band U2 that have been recorded and released.

== "40" ==
"40" is the tenth and final track from U2's 1983 album, War. It is the final single from the album, released solely in Germany in 1983. The song was recorded right at the end of the recording sessions for War. Bassist Adam Clayton had already left the studio, and the three remaining band members decided they did not have a good song to end the album. Bono noted that "We spent ten minutes writing this song, ten minutes recording it, ten minutes mixing it, ten minutes playing it back, and that's got nothing to do with why it's called '40'."

Year	Covered by	Album
1997	Charlie Hall	Joel's Window
2000	The Section	Strung out on U2
2001	dc Talk	Solo
2002	Michael W. Smith	Worship DVD
2003	Paul Meany	Elevator Music (Live Worship From Victory Fellowship)
2004	Starfield	In the Name of Love: Artists United for Africa
2005	The Frames	Even Better Than the Real Thing Vol. 3
2006	Ginny Owens	If You Want Me To: The Best of Ginny Owens

== Acrobat ==
"Acrobat" is the eleventh track from U2's 1991 album Achtung Baby.

Year	Covered by	Album
2011	Glasvegas	AHK-toong BAY-bi Covered

== All I Want Is You ==
"All I Want Is You" is the 17th song on U2's 1988 album, Rattle and Hum and was released in 1989 as the album's fourth and final single. It is the closing song from the movie Rattle and Hum.

Year	Covered by	Album
1999	Absolute Rock	A Tribute to the Greatest Hits of U2
1999	Mission UK	We Will Follow: A Tribute to U2
1999	Royal Philharmonic Orchestra	Pride: The Royal Philharmonic Orchestra Plays U2
1999	Tufts Beelzebubs	Infinity
2000	Kane	With or Without You
2000	Stereofeed	Strung Out on U2
2002	Bellefire	After the Rain
2002	Bellefire	"All I Want Is You"
2004	Jars of Clay	In the Name of Love: Artists United for Africa
2005	Les Paul and Johnny Rzeznik	American Made World Played
2005	Mark Geary	Even Better Than the Real Thing Vol. 3
2007	Rockabye Baby!	Lullaby Renditions of U2
2008	Glen Campbell	Meet Glen Campbell
2009	Aslan	UNCASE'd
2011	Mary Byrne	Mine & Yours
2013	Brian McFadden featuring Ronan Keating	The Irish Connection

== An Cat Dubh ==
"An Cat Dubh" is the third track from U2's debut album, Boy. It is frequently paired with the following song from the same album, "Into the Heart".

Year	Covered by	Release
2005	The Bravery	"Fearless"

== Angel of Harlem ==
"Angel of Harlem" is the second single from U2's 1988 album, Rattle and Hum. It peaked at #9 on the UK singles chart. It is an homage to Billie Holiday.

Year	Covered by	Album
1999	Absolute Rock	A Tribute to the Greatest Hits of U2
1999	Royal Philharmonic Orchestra	Pride: The Royal Philharmonic Orchestra Plays U2
2004	David Keen, Claire Stanacrone, and Michael Goetz	Still Strung Out on U2
2005	The Persuasions	The Persuasions Sing U2
2006	10,000 Maniacs	Live Twenty-Five
2007	Rockabye Baby!	Lullaby Renditions of U2

== A Sort of Homecoming ==
"A Sort of Homecoming" is the opening track from U2's 1984 album, The Unforgettable Fire.

Year	Covered by	Album
2025	Filter	The Algorithm (Ultra Edition)

== Bad ==
"Bad" is the seventh track from U2's 1984 album, The Unforgettable Fire. Often considered a fan favorite, it is U2's tenth most frequently performed song in concert. The song is about a heroin addiction.

Year	Covered by	Album
1998	Dream Theater	Once in a LIVEtime Outtakes
2000	The Section	Strung out on U2
2001	Luka Bloom	Keeper of the Flame
2005	Luka Bloom	Even Better Than the Real Thing Vol. 3

== Beautiful Day ==
"Beautiful Day" is the lead single from U2's 2000 album, All That You Can't Leave Behind. It was a huge commercial success, helping to launch the album to multi-platinum status, and is one of U2's biggest hits to date.

Year	Covered by	Album
2004	Hiro Goto and Adrienne Woods	Still Strung out on U2
2004	Kurt Nilsen	World Idol
2004	Royal Philharmonic Orchestra	Symphonic Rock
2004	Sanctus Real	In the Name of Love: Artists United for Africa
2007	Axel Rudi Pell	Diamonds Unlocked
2007	Rockabye Baby!	Lullaby Renditions of U2
2010	Lee DeWyze	"Beautiful Day"
2010	Altiyan Childs	Altiyan Childs
2012	Il Volo	We Are Love
2017	Nicole Nordeman	Every Mile Mattered
TBA	Cyrille Aimée	Unknown (soundtrack used During the cirque du soleil's "Crystal" show)

== Breathe ==
"Breathe" is the tenth track from U2's 2009 album No Line on the Horizon. Longtime U2 collaborator and producer Brian Eno cited Breathe as "the best thing (U2) have ever recorded" during an interview with Q magazine.

Year	Covered by	Album
2009	Vitamin String Quartet	The Vitamin String Quartet Performs U2's No Line on the Horizon

== Bullet the Blue Sky ==
"Bullet the Blue Sky" is the fourth track from U2's 1987 album, The Joshua Tree. The song was originally written about the United States' military intervention during the 1980s in the El Salvador Civil War.

Year	Covered by	Album
1999	P.O.D.	The Fundamental Elements of Southtown
2000	Kane	With or Without You
2000	Richard Cheese and Lounge Against the Machine	Lounge Against the Machine
2003	Sepultura	Revolusongs and Roorback
2007	Queensrÿche	Take Cover
2008	Vieux Farka Touré	In The Name Of Love: Africa Celebrates U2

== City of Blinding Lights ==
"City of Blinding Lights" is the fifth track and third single from the group's 2004 album How to Dismantle an Atomic Bomb. The song tells the story of U2's first arrival in New York City in 1980, with Bono remarking it was an "amazing, magical time in our life, when we didn't know how powerful it was not to know."

Year	Covered by	Album
2007	Tufts Beelzebubs	Pandæmonium
2010	Dashboard Confessional	By the People: For the People
2021	Charlie Benante	Silver Linings

== Desire ==
"Desire" is the lead single from U2's 1988 album, Rattle and Hum. It was their first #1 single in the UK and their first #1 on the newly instated Modern Rock Tracks chart.

Year	Covered by	Album
1999	Absolute Rock	A Tribute to the Greatest Hits of U2
1999	The Polecats	We Will Follow: A Tribute to U2
1999	Royal Philharmonic Orchestra	Pride: The Royal Philharmonic Orchestra Plays U2
2000	Savitri String Quartet	Strung Out on U2
2007	Rockabye Baby!	Lullaby Renditions of U2

== Drowning Man ==
"Drowning Man" is the fifth track on U2's 1983 album, War. Its sound is a departure from the other tracks in War.

Year	Covered by	Album
1995	Smith & Mighty	Bass Is Maternal^{1}

== The Electric Co. ==
"The Electric Co." is the tenth track from U2's debut album, Boy. When performed live it is frequently preceded by the unrecorded song, "The Cry".

Year	Covered by	Album
2000	Kane	With or Without You

== Elevation ==
"Elevation" is the third track and third single release from U2's 2000 album, All That You Can't Leave Behind. Featuring a thunderous beat, a variety of sound effects on the central guitar riff, and an easy rhyming lyric for the audience to shout along with, it was highly effective in that concert-starting role and became a hit in the United States and the United Kingdom.

Year	Covered by	Album
2002	Tufts Beelzebubs	Punch
2010	Sherie Rene Scott, Lindsay Mendez, Betsy Wolfe	Everyday Rapture

== Even Better Than the Real Thing ==
"Even Better Than the Real Thing" is the second song from U2's 1991 album, Achtung Baby and was released in 1992 as the fourth single from the album.

Year	Covered by	Album
1999	Absolute Rock	A Tribute to the Greatest Hits of U2
1999	Bang Tango^{2}	We Will Follow: A Tribute to U2
1999	Dead or Alive	We Will Follow: A Tribute to U2
1999	Royal Philharmonic Orchestra	Pride: The Royal Philharmonic Orchestra Plays U2
2005	Jack L	Even Better Than the Real Thing Vol. 3
2005	The Persuasions	The Persuasions Sing U2

== Exit ==
Exit is the 10th track of U2's Joshua Tree, released in 1987.

Year	Covered by	Album
2003	Anthrax	Taking the Music Back

== The Fly ==
"The Fly" is the seventh song on U2's 1991 album, Achtung Baby and was released as the album's first single. It has been described as "the sound of four men chopping down the Joshua Tree." The song's subject is that of a phone call from someone in Hell who enjoys being there and telling the person on the other line what he has learned. "The Fly" was an introduction to the sonic and electronic experimentation that would dominate U2's 1990s work.

Year	Covered by	Album
1999	Absolute Rock	A Tribute to the Greatest Hits of U2
2006	Peter Mulvey	The Knuckleball Suite
2011	Gavin Friday	AHK-toong BAY-bi Covered

== Get on Your Boots ==
"Get on Your Boots" is the lead single and sixth track from No Line on the Horizon.

Year	Covered by	Album
2009	Vitamin String Quartet	The Vitamin String Quartet Performs U2's No Line on the Horizon
2009	The Wrecking	A New Abolition (Special Edition)

== Gloria ==
"Gloria" was the second single and opening track from U2's 1981 album, October.

Year	Covered by	Album
2004	Audio Adrenaline	In the Name of Love: Artists United for Africa
2004	David Keen	Still Strung Out on U2
2012	Kenna	Non-album track

== God Part II ==
"God Part II" is the fourteenth track from U2's 1988 album, Rattle and Hum. The song is a departure from the sound of the album's other studio recordings, and is an introduction to the darker sound the band would adopt for the release of their next album, Achtung Baby.

Year	Covered by	Album
1991	Katmandu	Katmandu

== Grace ==
"Grace" is the final track from U2's 2000 album, All That You Can't Leave Behind.

Year	Covered by	Album
2004	Nichole Nordeman	In the Name of Love: Artists United for Africa

== Heartland ==
"Heartland" is the thirteenth track from U2's 1988 album, Rattle and Hum. Unlike the other studio tracks from the album, "Heartland" was left over from The Joshua Tree sessions.

Year	Covered by	Album
2005	Bell X1	Even Better Than the Real Thing Vol. 3

== Hold Me, Thrill Me, Kiss Me, Kill Me ==
"Hold Me, Thrill Me, Kiss Me, Kill Me" is a single by U2 from the Batman Forever soundtrack album, released in 1995. It was also included on the compilation album, The Best of 1990-2000. As well as all the covers, "Weird Al" Yankovic parodied the song as "Cavity Search" for his 1996 album Bad Hair Day.

Year	Covered by	Album
1997	The Countdown Singers	Best of Today's Movie Hits
2002	The Brown Derbies	Hybrid
2002	Cactus Jack	DisCover
2004	Cactus Jack	Natur all^{3}

== I Still Haven't Found What I'm Looking For ==
"I Still Haven't Found What I'm Looking For" is the second track from U2's 1987 album The Joshua Tree, and was released as the album's second single. The song grew from another song called "Under the Weather Girls", from which Larry Mullen Jr.'s drum track was used as a foundation. "I Still Haven't Found What I'm Looking For" is the most frequently covered U2 song.

Year	Covered by	Album
1990	The Chimes	I Still Haven't Found What I'm Looking For
1990	Phil Coulter	Recollections^{4}
1991	Badesalz	I Still Haven't Found What I'm Looking For
1991	Big Daddy	Cutting Their Own Groove
1991	Negativland	U2
1992	Cecilio & Kapono	Summerlust
1993	The Brown Derbies	Hat Trick
1993	Tufts Beelzebubs	Vince
1994	Booker T. & The M.G.s	That's The Way It Should Be
1996	Chumbawamba	No Compromize
1997	Seal and Steve Winwood	Songs & Visions Spectacular: Live in London 1997
1998	James McNally	Everybreath
1999	Absolute Rock	A Tribute to the Greatest Hits of U2
1999	Royal Philharmonic Orchestra	Pride: The Royal Philharmonic Orchestra Plays U2
2000	The Countdown Singers	80's Chartbusters
2000	Savitri String Quartet	Strung Out on U2
2001	Brendan Bowyer	Follow On
2003	Bonnie Tyler	Heart Strings
2003	Cher	Live! The Farewell Tour
2005	Juliet Turner	Even Better Than the Real Thing Vol. 3
2005	The Persuasions	The Persuasions Sing U2
2006	Journey South	Journey South
2006	Buena Vista Social Club (with the vocals of U2)	Rhythms del Mundo
2007	Rockabye Baby!	Lullaby Renditions of U2
2007	Royal Philharmonic Orchestra	The Royal Philharmonic Orchestra Performs #1 Hits
2008	Cheikh Lô	In The Name Of Love: Africa Celebrates U2
2008	David Cook	David Cook - American Idol Studio Recording Single
2009	Cast of NBC's The Sing-Off	I Still Haven't Found What I'm Searching For
2010	Disturbed	Asylum
2010	Will Martin	Inspirations
2010	Celtic Thunder	It's Entertainment
2014	Cast of Glee	Glee: The Music, City of Angels and the episode "City of Angels"
2014	Peter Hollens and Sabrina Carpenter	Peter Hollens (album)
2020	Dan Avidan and Super Guitar Bros	Dan Avidan & Super Guitar Bros
2021	Bono and Scarlett Johansson	Sing 2

== I Will Follow ==
"I Will Follow" is the opening track from U2's debut album, Boy. It was written by Bono about the death of his mother, who died of a brain hemorrhage at the funeral of her father.

Year	Covered by	Album
1995	Breakfast with Amy	Live at the Hawleywould Bowl!
1998	Doug Pinnick	The Mother of all Tribute Albums
1999	Spahn Ranch	We Will Follow: A Tribute to U2
2000	Kane	With or Without You
2000	Savitri String Quartet	Strung Out on U2
2005	Fear Factory	Transgression
2006	The Upper Room	Other People's Problems (Japanese Edition)
2007	The Chaser	The Chaser's War on Everything: Season 2
2009	MxPx	On the Cover II

Year	Covered by	Concert
1999	Collective Soul	Woodstock 1999 - July 25 - West Stage

== I'll Go Crazy If I Don't Go Crazy Tonight ==
"I'll Go Crazy If I Don't Go Crazy Tonight" is the third single and fifth track from the 2009 album No Line on the Horizon. The track underwent several name changes during the album sessions, known first as "Diorama" and then "Crazy Tonight" before the final selection. Several of the song's lyrics were influenced by Barack Obama's presidential campaign. The song was used in television commercials for a new Blackberry application, called the "U2 Mobile App", which was developed as part of Research in Motion's sponsorship of the U2 360° Tour.

Year	Covered by	Album
2009	Vitamin String Quartet	The Vitamin String Quartet Performs U2's No Line on the Horizon

== In a Little While ==
"In a Little While" is the sixth track from U2's 2000 album All That You Can't Leave Behind. While originally about a hangover, Bono later stated that the song's connection to Joey Ramone—being the last song he heard before his death in 2001—has given it a deeper religious meaning, and he now refers to it as a Gospel song". "In a Little While" was played often throughout the Elevation Tour, and was frequently snippeted inside "I Still Haven't Found What I'm Looking For" during the Vertigo Tour.

Year	Covered by	Album
2005	Hanson	The Best of Hanson: Live & Electric
2011	William Shatner	Seeking Major Tom

== In God's Country ==
"In God's Country" is the seventh track and fourth single from U2's 1987 album, The Joshua Tree. A live version of the song appears in the U2 rockumentary, Rattle and Hum.

Year	Covered by	Album
1998	Caedmon's Call	The Guild Collection Vol. 2
2004	Hiro Goto and Adrienne Woods	Still Strung Out on U2
2005	Tribe of Heaven (Dave Matthews and Mark Roebuck)	Imagine We Were
2010	Infamous Stringdusters	Things That Fly

== Like a Song... ==
"Like a Song..." is the fourth track from U2's 1983 album, War. It was only played live once, on 26 February 1983 in Dundee, Scotland.

Year	Covered by	Album
1991	Believer	Sanity Obscure

== Love Is Blindness ==
"Love Is Blindness" is the twelfth and final song from U2's 1991 album, Achtung Baby. Much of the album relates to love gone wrong, in one form or another; the lyrics to "Love Is Blindness" reflect this theme, juxtaposing love and violent imagery.

Year	Covered by	Album
1996	Cassandra Wilson	New Moon Daughter
2000	Kane	With or Without You
2001	Trespassers William	Even Better than the Real Thing
2004	Sixpence None the Richer	In the Name of Love: Artists United for Africa
2005	The Devlins, featuring Sharon Corr	Even Better Than the Real Thing Vol. 3
2006	The Devlins	Rescue Me
2008	Waldemar Bastos	In The Name Of Love: Africa Celebrates U2
2011	Jack White	AHK-toong BAY-bi Covered

== Love Rescue Me ==
"Love Rescue Me" is the eleventh track from U2's 1988 album, Rattle and Hum. It is a collaboration between the band and Bob Dylan, who also provides vocals to the recording.

Year	Covered by	Album
2005	Roesy	Even Better Than the Real Thing Vol. 3

== Magnificent ==
"Magnificent" is the second track and single from No Line on the Horizon. The track was originally titled "French Disco", but was renamed during the recording process.

Year	Covered by	Album
2009	Vitamin String Quartet	The Vitamin String Quartet Performs U2's No Line on the Horizon

== Miss Sarajevo ==
"Miss Sarajevo" is the only single from the 1995 album Original Soundtracks 1 by U2, under the pseudonym Passengers. Luciano Pavarotti makes a guest vocal appearance, singing the opera solo. It also appears on the compilation album, The Best of 1990–2000.

Year	Covered by	Album
1999	George Michael	Songs from the Last Century

== MLK ==
"MLK" is the tenth and final track of U2's 1984 album, The Unforgettable Fire. A lullaby to honor Martin Luther King Jr., it is a short, pensive piece with simple lyrics.

Year	Covered by	Album
1988	Joan Baez	Recently and Brothers in Arms
1993	Kings Singers	Good Vibrations
2011	Vocal Spectrum	Vocal Spectrum III

== Moment of Surrender ==
"Moment of Surrender" is the third track from No Line on the Horizon. The song tells the story of a heroin addict's spiritual awakening at an automated teller machine.

Year	Covered by	Album
2009	Vitamin String Quartet	The Vitamin String Quartet Performs U2's No Line on the Horizon

== Mothers of the Disappeared ==
"Mothers of the Disappeared" is the eleventh and final track from U2's 1987 album, The Joshua Tree.

Year	Covered by	Album
2005	Paddy Casey	Even Better Than the Real Thing Vol. 3

== Mysterious Ways ==
"Mysterious Ways" is the eighth track on U2's 1991 album, Achtung Baby, and was released as the album's second single.

Year	Covered by	Album
1993	KMFDM	Shut Up Kitty and Agogo
1993	Paul Shaffer and The Party Boys of Rock 'n' Roll	The World's Most Dangerous Party
2000	Stereofeed	Strung Out on U2
2004	tobyMac and Sarah Kelly	In the Name of Love: Artists United for Africa
2005	The Persuasions	The Persuasions Sing U2
2008	Angélique Kidjo	In The Name of Love: Africa Celebrates U2
2011	Snow Patrol	AHK-toong BAY-bi Covered

== New Year's Day ==
"New Year's Day" is the third song and lead single from U2's 1983 album, War. The song is driven by Adam Clayton's distinctive bassline and The Edge's keyboard. It was the band's first hit single, breaking the top ten in the UK and charting on the Billboard Hot 100 for the first time in their career. In 2004, Rolling Stone magazine placed the single at number 427 on their list of the 500 Greatest Songs of All Time.

Year	Covered by	Album
1995	Gigi D'Agostino	New Year's Day
1999	Front Line Assembly with Tiffany	We Will Follow: A Tribute to U2
1999	Royal Philharmonic Orchestra	Pride: The Royal Philharmonic Orchestra Plays U2
1999	Ferry Corsten	
2000	Savitri String Quartet	Strung out on U2
2004	Zeraphine	single only (later released on compilation album Years in Black (2007)
2005	To/Die/For	IV
2005	Aslan	Even Better Than the Real Thing Vol. 3
2007	Rockabye Baby!	Lullaby Renditions of U2
2009	Steve Morse with Billy Sherwood	An All-Star Salute to Christmas
2010	Inverse Phase	Retrocovered
2023	Pop Noir	New Year's Day - Single

== No Line on the Horizon ==
"No Line on the Horizon" is the opening and title track from the 2009 album No Line on the Horizon.

Year	Covered by	Album
2009	Vitamin String Quartet	The Vitamin String Quartet Performs U2's No Line on the Horizon

== North and South of the River ==
"North and South of the River" is a B-side to the 1997 single "Staring at the Sun".

Year	Covered by	Album
1996	Christy Moore	Graffiti Tongue

== Numb ==
"Numb" is the third track from U2's 1993 album, Zooropa, and was released as the album's first single.

Year	Covered by	Album
1999	Die Krupps	We Will Follow: A Tribute to U2

== October ==
"October" is the seventh and title track from U2's 1981 album, October. It is a departure from U2's classic sound, as it is a quiet, almost instrumental piece. It was included as a hidden track on The Best of 1980–1990.

Year	Covered by	Album
1999	Rosetta Stone	We Will Follow: A Tribute to U2
2005	The Divine Comedy	Even Better Than the Real Thing Vol. 3

== One ==
"One" is the third song from U2's 1991 album, Achtung Baby, and was released as a single in 1992. Tensions during the recording of the album almost prompted U2 to break-up until the band rallied around the writing of "One". It is widely considered to be one of the band's greatest songs and is consistently featured in lists of the greatest songs of all time, including Rolling Stone's list of the 500 Greatest Songs of All Time, where it placed #36, and #1 on Q Magazine's list of the 1001 Greatest Songs of All-Time.

Year	Covered by	Album
1995	Automatic Baby	Live X II - One Life
1995	Mica Paris	"One"
1999	Absolute Rock	A Tribute to the Greatest Hits of U2
1999	Information Society	We Will Follow: A Tribute to U2
1999	Royal Philharmonic Orchestra	Pride: The Royal Philharmonic Orchestra Plays U2
2000	Johnny Cash	American III: Solitary Man
2000	Kane	With or Without You
2001	Lighthouse Family	Whatever Gets You Through the Day
2003	Jarvis Church	Peace Songs
2004	Joe Cocker	Heart & Soul
2004	David Keen	Still Strung out on U2
2004	Jimmy Little	Life's What You Make It
2004	Tait	In the Name of Love: Artists United for Africa
2004	Warren Haynes	Live at Bonnaroo
2004	Wendy Matthews	Café Naturale
2005	Cowboy Junkies	Early 21st Century Blues
2005	Shinedown	Stripped Raw and Real
2005	Jerry Fish and the Mudbug Club	Even Better Than the Real Thing Vol. 3
2005	The Persuasions	The Persuasions Sing U2
2006	Mary J. Blige	The Breakthrough
2007	Rockabye Baby!	Lullaby Renditions of U2
2008	Keziah Jones	In The Name Of Love: Africa Celebrates U2
2008	Jacques Stotzem	Catch the Spirit
2008	Young@Heart	Mostly Live
2009	Adam Lambert	One (American Idol Studio Version)
2009	Jason and deMarco	Safe
2009	Idina Menzel	N/A
2010	Glee Cast	Glee: The Music, Volume 3 Showstoppers
2010	Treyc Cohen	X Factor 2010
2011	Overload	Overload Live at the Apartment Sessions
2011	Damien Rice	AHK-toong BAY-bi Covered
2012	Anastacia	It's a Man's World
2012	James Arthur	The X Factor UK 2012
2013	Billy Simpson	The Voice Indonesia 2013
2013	Dami Im	Dami Im (album)
2014	Mango	L'amore è invisibile
2019	Jan Rot in Dutch as 'Eén'	O ja!
2022	Fontaines D.C	Skinty Fia go deo

== One Tree Hill ==
"One Tree Hill" is the ninth track and final single from U2's 1987 album, The Joshua Tree. The single was released as a single exclusively in New Zealand in 1988, where it reached number one. The title of the song refers to One Tree Hill, a volcanic peak in Auckland, New Zealand.

Year	Covered by	Album
1993	Mortal	Intense Live Series Vol. 5

== Pride (In the Name of Love) ==
"Pride (In the Name of Love)" is the second song on U2's 1984 album, The Unforgettable Fire and was released as the album's first single. Written about Martin Luther King Jr., it is one of the band's most recognized songs.

Year	Covered by	Album
1987	Barbara Dickson	After Dark
1991	C&C Music Factory	Pride (In the Name of Love)
1992	Clivilles & Cole	Gladiator: Music From The Motion Picture (1992 Film)
1994	Tufts Beelzebubs	House
1997	The Brown Derbies	Nightcap
1999	Absolute Rock	A Tribute to the Greatest Hits of U2
1999	Razed in Black	We Will Follow: A Tribute to U2
1999	Royal Philharmonic Orchestra	Pride: The Royal Philharmonic Orchestra Plays U2
2000	Kane	With or Without You
2004	Tabby Callaghan	The X Factor
2004	Delirious?	In the Name of Love: Artists United for Africa
2004	David Keen	Still Strung Out on U2
2005	The Persuasions	The Persuasions Sing U2
2006	Flyleaf with Richard Patrick	Family Values Tour 2006
2006	Nouvelle Vague	Bande à Part
2006	Shawn Colvin	These Four Walls
2008	Soweto Gospel Choir	In The Name Of Love: Africa Celebrates U2
2008	John Legend	History Channel: King
2010	Dierks Bentley	Up on the Ridge
2011	Michael Bolton feat. Anne Akiko Meyers	Gems
2012	David Archuleta	Begin
2014	Dierks Bentley and OneRepublic	CMT Crossroads
2018	Lxandra	Pride (In The Name of Love)
2021	Garbage	Beautiful Garbage: 20th Anniversary Edition

== Promenade ==
"Promenade" is the fifth track on U2's 1984 album, The Unforgettable Fire.

Year	Covered by	Album
2001	Calla	Scavengers

== Red Hill Mining Town ==
"Red Hill Mining Town" is the sixth track from U2's 1987 album, The Joshua Tree.

Year	Covered by	Album
1996	Dream Theater	International Fanclub Christmas Album

== Running to Stand Still ==
"Running to Stand Still" is the fifth track from U2's 1987 album, The Joshua Tree. It is a soft, slow, keyboard-based song about a heroin-addicted woman from the Ballymun Seven Towers area of Dublin.

Year	Covered by	Album
1995	Mortal	Gray Dot Records - Summer 95 - Prerelease Sampler
2000	Kane	With or Without You
2003	Braddigan	Dirt Level Demos
2005	Mickey Harte	Even Better Than the Real Thing Vol. 3
2009	Elbow	War Child: Heroes

== Seconds ==
"Seconds" is the second track on U2's 1983 album, War. The track contains a clip from the 1982 documentary Soldier Girls, and is the first song by the band not sung solely by Bono; The Edge sings the first two stanzas.

Year	Covered by	Album
2005	Mundy	Even Better Than the Real Thing Vol. 3
2005	Rogue Wave	iTunes Exclusive EP
2008	Sierra Leone's Refugee All Stars	In The Name Of Love: Africa Celebrates U2

== So Cruel ==
"So Cruel" is the sixth track from U2's 1991 album, Achtung Baby.

Year	Covered by	Album
2005	Erin McKeown	Even Better Than the Real Thing Vol. 3
2011	Depeche Mode	AHK-toong BAY-bi Covered

== Sometimes You Can't Make It on Your Own ==
"Sometimes You Can't Make It on Your Own" is the second single from U2's 2004 album, How to Dismantle an Atomic Bomb. It was released in the United Kingdom in February 2005, and debuted at #1 on the UK Singles Chart. The song won Best Rock Performance by a Duo or Group with Vocal and Song of the Year at the 2006 Grammy Awards.

Year	Covered by	Album
2005	The Persuasions	The Persuasions Sing U2
2008	Vusi Mahlasela	In The Name Of Love: Africa Celebrates U2

== Stay (Faraway, So Close!) ==
"Stay (Faraway, So Close!)" is the fifth track from U2's 1993 album, Zooropa, and was released as the album's third single on November 22, 1993. It was released on the soundtrack for the Wim Wenders film, Faraway, So Close!. While speaking with Rolling Stone, Bono noted that "Stay (Faraway, So Close!)" is one of his personal favourite, and one of their most underrated, U2 songs.

Year	Covered by	Album
2002	Craig Armstrong and Bono	As If to Nothing
2009	Flyleaf	Memento Mori

== Stuck in a Moment You Can't Get Out Of ==
"Stuck in a Moment You Can't Get Out Of" is a single release from U2's 2000 album, All That You Can't Leave Behind. It won the Grammy Award for Best Pop Performance by a Duo or Group with Vocal in 2002.

Year	Covered by	Album
2003	Joe Dolan	Home Grown
2004	Hiro Goto and Adrienne Woods	Still Strung out on U2
2005	The Persuasions	The Persuasions Sing U2
2010	K'naan	Live on iHeartRadio

== Sunday Bloody Sunday ==
"Sunday Bloody Sunday" is the opening track and third single from U2's 1983 album, War. The song is noted for its militaristic drumbeat, simple but harsh guitar, and melodic harmonies. One of U2's most overtly political songs, its lyrics describe the horror felt by an observer of The Troubles in Northern Ireland.

Year	Covered by	Album
1990	Phil Coulter	Recollections^{4}
1998	Echo Hollow	The Mother of all Tribute Albums
1999	Electric Hellfire Club	We Will Follow: A Tribute to U2
1999	Royal Philharmonic Orchestra	Pride: The Royal Philharmonic Orchestra Plays U2
2000	The Section	Strung out on U2
2001	Evergreen Terrace	Losing All Hope Is Freedom
2004	The Living End	From Here On In
2004	Pillar	In the Name of Love: Artists United for Africa
2004	Red Hot Chili Peppers	Live in Hyde Park
2004	Evergreen Terrace	Writer's Block
2005	Damien Dempsey	Even Better Than the Real Thing Vol. 3
2005	Funeral for a Friend	Monsters
2005	Richard Cheese and Lounge Against the Machine	Aperitif for Destruction
2006	Daughtry	Napster Live Acoustic
2006	Massiv In Mensch	Clubber Lang
2006	Ignite	Our Darkest Days
2007	Paramore	Misery Business
2007	The Roots	Live
2007	Rockabye Baby!	Lullaby Renditions of U2
2007	Saul Williams	The Inevitable Rise and Liberation of NiggyTardust!
2008	Ba Cissoko	In The Name Of Love: Africa Celebrates U2
2010	Nolwenn Leroy	Bretonne
2011	Veil of Maya	Homefront Original Soundtrack
2012	Porcelain Black (Feat. 7 Lions)	-
2012	William Control	Skeleton Strings 2

== Sweetest Thing ==
"Sweetest Thing", sometimes titled "The Sweetest Thing", is a B-side to the "Where the Streets Have No Name" single. It was re-recorded and released as a single for the 1998 compilation album The Best of 1980-1990. The song was written by Bono as an apology to his wife for forgetting her birthday during the creation of The Joshua Tree.

Year	Covered by	Album
2007	Rockabye Baby!	Lullaby Renditions of U2

== Tomorrow ==
"Tomorrow" is the sixth track on 1981's October album.

Year	Covered by	Album
1996	Bono and Adam Clayton	Common Ground: Voices of Modern Irish Music

== Tryin' to Throw Your Arms Around the World ==
"Tryin' to Throw Your Arms Around the World" is the ninth track on the 1991 album, Achtung Baby. The song is a lighthearted account of a drunken journey home.

Year	Covered by	Album
2005	The Persuasions	The Persuasions Sing U2
2011	The Fray	AHK-toong BAY-bi Covered

== Two Hearts Beat as One ==
"Two Hearts Beat as One" is the seventh track on U2's 1983 album, War. It was released as the album's second single but only in the US, UK and Australia.

Year	Covered by	Album
1999	Royal Philharmonic Orchestra	Pride: The Royal Philharmonic Orchestra Plays U2

== Ultraviolet (Light My Way) ==
"Ultraviolet (Light My Way)" is the tenth track from U2's 1991 album Achtung Baby.

Year	Covered by	Album
2011	The Killers	AHK-toong BAY-bi Covered

== The Unforgettable Fire ==
"The Unforgettable Fire" is the fourth track from the 1984 album of the same name, and was released in 1985 as the album's second and last single. The title is a reference to the atomic bombing of Hiroshima, Japan in World War II.

Year	Covered by	Album
1999	Absolute Rock	A Tribute to the Greatest Hits of U2
2000	Kane	With or Without You
2003	Calcinha Preta	A Gente Se Vê Lá as "Fique Amor"

== Unknown Caller ==
"Unknown Caller" is the fourth track from the 2009 album No Line on the Horizon. According to The Edge, "the idea is that the narrator is in an altered state, and his phone starts talking to him".

Year	Covered by	Album
2009	Vitamin String Quartet	The Vitamin String Quartet Performs U2's No Line on the Horizon

== Until the End of the World ==
"Until the End of the World" is the fourth track from U2's 1991 album, Achtung Baby. The song is reputed to describe a conversation between Jesus Christ and Judas Iscariot.

Year	Covered by	Album
1999	Absolute Rock	A Tribute to the Greatest Hits of U2
2011	Patti Smith	AHK-toong BAY-bi Covered

== Vertigo ==
"Vertigo" is the lead single and opening track for the 2004 album How to Dismantle an Atomic Bomb. The track was an international hit, winning three Grammy awards at the 2005 event and being featured in an iPod commercial.

Year	Covered by	Album
2005	Kidz Bop Kids	Kidz Bop 8

== The Wanderer ==
"The Wanderer" is the tenth and final track on the 1993 album Zooropa. The song features Johnny Cash on lead vocals and tells the story of a man searching for God in the ruins of a post-apocalyptic world. The song has only been performed live once, as a posthumous tribute to Johnny Cash, with Bono singing lead vocals.

Year	Covered by	Album
2005	The Persuasions	The Persuasions Sing U2

== Wake Up Dead Man ==
"Wake Up Dead Man" is the closing track from the 1997 album Pop. The title was first revealed in 1993, as part of it was superimposed on the cover of the album Zooropa.

Year	Covered by	Album
2002	Maria João	Undercovers

== Walk On ==
"Walk On" is the fourth single and track from the album All That You Can't Leave Behind. Written about and dedicated to Aung San Suu Kyi, the track is banned in Burma, and anyone who has possession of either the single of the song or the album could face a prison sentence lasting between three and twenty years. The title for All That You Can't Leave Behind stems from lyrics in the song.

Year	Covered by	Album
2003	Darlene Zschech	Kiss of Heaven

== When Love Comes to Town ==
"When Love Comes to Town" was a collaboration between U2 and B.B. King, released as a single for the album Rattle and Hum.

Year	Covered by	Album
1999	Absolute Rock	A Tribute to the Greatest Hits of U2
1999	Royal Philharmonic Orchestra	Pride: The Royal Philharmonic Orchestra Plays U2
2000	Bryan Sutton	Ready to Go
2004	Todd Agnew	In the Name of Love: Artists United for Africa
2005	Declan O'Rourke	Even Better Than the Real Thing Vol. 3
2005	The Persuasions	The Persuasions Sing U2
2005	Herbie Hancock featuring Jonny Lang and Joss Stone	Possibilities
2009	Third Day featuring Jars of Clay, Switchfoot, and Robert Randolph	Live Revelations

== Where the Streets Have No Name ==
"Where the Streets Have No Name" is the third single from the 1987 album The Joshua Tree. The track's signature is a repeating guitar arpeggio utilizing a delay effect that is played at the beginning and end of the song. The song's frequent chord and time changes caused problems in playing the song correctly; the difficulty was so great that producer Brian Eno attempted to erase the track. Drummer Larry Mullen Jr. later said of the song, "It took so long to get that song right, it was difficult for us to make any sense of it. It only became a truly great song through playing live. On the record, musically, it's not half the song it is live."

Year	Covered by	Album
1991	Pet Shop Boys	Where the Streets Have No Name (I Can't Take My Eyes off You)
1999	Absolute Rock	A Tribute to the Greatest Hits of U2
2000	Kane	With or Without You
2000	The Section	Strung out on U2
2004	Chris Tomlin	In the Name of Love: Artists United for Africa
2004	Vanessa Carlton	Harmonium
2004	MercyMe	Live
2005	Avalanch	Mother Earth
2006	Neal Morse	Cover to Cover
2007	Rockabye Baby!	Lullaby Renditions of U2
2009	Térez Montcalm	Connection
2010	Where The Beats… (live version)	Under the Radar Over the Top
2011	Thirty Seconds to Mars	MTV Unplugged
2011	2Cellos	2Cellos
2013	Gregorian	Masters of Chanter: Chapter 9
2015	Kurt Elling	Passion World
2021	Tori Kelly & Taron Egerton & Scarlett Johansson & Reese Witherspoon & Nick Kroll	Sing 2
2026	We Are Messengers ft. Moya Brennan	The Irish Sessions / Honest EP

== Who's Gonna Ride Your Wild Horses ==
"Who's Gonna Ride Your Wild Horses" was released in 1992 as the fifth and final single for the 1991 album Achtung Baby.

Year	Covered by	Album
1999	Absolute Rock	A Tribute to the Greatest Hits of U2
1999	Royal Philharmonic Orchestra	Pride: The Royal Philharmonic Orchestra Plays U2
2005	Picturehouse	Even Better Than the Real Thing Vol. 3
2005	Tom Baxter	Even Better Than the Real Thing Vol. 3
2006	Apoptygma Berzerk	Sonic Diary
2008	ThouShaltNot	New World EP
2011	Garbage	AHK-toong BAY-bi Covered

== With or Without You ==
"With or Without You" is the lead single from U2's 1987 album, The Joshua Tree. It has since become highly acclaimed as one of the band's most popular songs. Released as a single in March 1987, it became the group's first American #1 hit.

Year	Covered by	Album
1991	Jawbreaker	Jawbreaker / Jawbox Split "7
1996	Zhi-Vago	With or Without You (Single only)
1997	Mary Kiani	Long Hard Funky Dreams
1997	Third Day	Live at The Strand
1998	Ikon	This Quiet Earth (Limited Edition Version)
1999	Absolute Rock	A Tribute to the Greatest Hits of U2
1999	Heaven 17	We Will Follow: A Tribute to U2
2000	Kane	With or Without You
2000	The Section	Strung out on U2
2001	Hikaru Utada	Utada Hikaru Unplugged
2003	Gregorian	Masters of Chant Chapter IV
2004	LMC	Take Me to the Clouds Above (Note: Only melody sample use mixed with Whitney Houston's "How Will I Know")
2004	GRITS & Jadyn Maria	In the Name of Love: Artists United for Africa
2004	Royal Philharmonic Orchestra	Legends
2004	Scala & Kolacny Brothers	Dream On
2005	Loona	Wind of Time
2005	The Walls	Even Better Than the Real Thing Vol. 3
2005	Ben Broussard	Oh Say Can You Sing? Music Recordings by Major League Baseball Players
2006	Keane	Hopes and Fears (Special Edition)^{5}
2007	Rockabye Baby!	Lullaby Renditions of U2
2007	Sitti Navarro	My Bossa Nova
2007	Glay	Verb
2007	Breathe Carolina	With or Without You (Single only)
2008	Jacques Stotzem	Catch the Spirit
2008	Les Nubians	In The Name Of Love: Africa Celebrates U2
2008	No Justice	Live at Billy Bob's
2008	Wayne Hussey	Bare
2008	Diana Vickers	The X Factor: Final 12
2009	Espen Lind, Kurt Nilsen, Alejandro Fuentes & Askil Holm	Hallelujah vol. 2
2009	Blake (band)	Together
2009	Rachel Adedeji	The X Factor: Final 12
2010	We Are the Fallen	Billboard.com: Mashup Mondays
2011	Sarah Darling	Angels & Devils
2011	2Cellos	2Cellos
2011	Jai McDowall	Believe
2014	Jackie Evancho	Awakening
2014	Imagine Dragons	Live at Bud Light Hotel
2014	Daughtry	18 Years
2014	Amy Lee	Covers on YouTube: Amy Lee/ Recover Vol. 1 [EP]
2015	Daniel Cavanagh	Memory & Meaning
2017	Thompson Square	With or Without You
2017	April Meservy	With or Without You
2017	Linkin Park and Ryan Key of Yellowcard	Linkin Park and Friends: Celebrate Life in Honor of Chester Bennington
2024	Davey T Hamilton	Classics

== Zoo Station ==
"Zoo Station" is the first track on U2's 1991 album Achtung Baby.

Year	Covered by	Album
2011	Nine Inch Nails	AHK-toong BAY-bi Covered

== Notes ==
1. On this release, the title of "Drowning Man" was changed to "Drowning Man (Drowning)".
2. This cover of "Even Better Than the Real Thing" was released as the "Julian Beeston Mix".
3. This cover was in Serbian language and entitled "Model donjeg veša" (transl. "Lingerie Model").
4. The songs "I Still Haven't Found What I'm Looking For" and "Sunday Bloody Sunday" were combined on this track.
5. Live version recorded in a 2005 BBC Radio 1 Live Lounge; track was not released until November 2009.
6. This cover of "Discothèque" was released as the "Suspiria Mix".
