= Absolute Christmas =

Compilation album by Various artists
- Released: November 25, 1994
- Recorded: 1942–1994
- Genre: Holiday
- Label: EVA Records

Absolute Christmas series chronology
| Absolute Christmas (1994) | Absolute Christmas 1999 (1999) |

Absolute Christmas is a Christmas music compilation album in the Absolute-series marketed in Sweden by EVA Records. The album is the best selling compilation album of all time in Sweden. It sold 200 000 copies on its release in 1994 and later sold more than 500 000 copies, in a market where sales of 80,000 was the threshold for platinum 1996–2002.

The compilation was compiled by Lasse Höglund during the hot summer of 1994.

== Track listing ==
=== CD 1 ===
| No. | Title | Artist | Length |
|---|---|---|---|
| 1. | "Happy Xmas (War Is Over)" | John Lennon & Yoko Ono – The Plastic Ono Band |
| 2. | "Do They Know It's Christmas?" | Band Aid |
| 3. | "Tänd ett ljus" | Triad |
| 4. | "Last Christmas" | Wham! |
| 5. | "Juligen" | Just D |
| 6. | "Rockin' Around the Christmas Tree" | Mel & Kim |
| 7. | "Snart kommer änglarna att landa" | Ulf Lundell |
| 8. | "Fairytale of New York" | The Pogues featuring Kirsty MacColl |
| 9. | "Mary's Boy Child" | Boney M |
| 10. | "Merry Xmas Everybody" | Slade |
| 11. | "I Wish Everyday Could Be Like Christmas" | Bon Jovi |
| 12. | "Mer jul" | Adolphson & Falk |
| 13. | "Driving Home for Christmas" | Chris Rea |
| 14. | "It May Be Winter Outside" | S-Connection |
| 15. | "I Wish It Could Be Christmas Everyday" | Roy Wood with Wizzard |
| 16. | "Peace on Earth/Little Drummer Boy" | Bing Crosby & David Bowie |
| 17. | "Oiche Chiún (Stille Nacht, heilige Nacht)" | Enya |

=== CD 2 ===
| No. | Title | Artist | Length |
|---|---|---|---|
| 1. | "White Christmas" | Bing Crosby |
| 2. | "Blue Christmas" | Elvis Presley |
| 3. | "Rudolph the Red-Nosed Reindeer" | Dean Martin |
| 4. | "Jingle Bell Rock" | Bobby Helms |
| 5. | "Mistletoe & Wine" | Cliff Richard |
| 6. | "Nu tändas tusen juleljus" | Carola |
| 7. | "Feliz Navidad" | José Feliciano |
| 8. | "Jag såg mamma kyssa tomten (I Saw Mommy Kissing Santa Claus)" | Troll |
| 9. | "The Christmas Song (Merry Christmas to You)" | Nat King Cole |
| 10. | "Winter Wonderland – Sleigh Ride" | Dolly Parton |
| 11. | "Jingle Bells" | Jim Reeves |
| 12. | "We Wish You a Merry Christmas" | The Weavers |
| 13. | "Mary's Boy Child" | Harry Belafonte |
| 14. | "Låt mig få tända ett ljus" | Siv Pettersson |
| 15. | "O helga natt (Cantique de Noël)" | Jörgen Edman |
| 16. | "Silent Night (Stille Nacht, heilige Nacht)" | Mahalia Jackson |
| 17. | "Happy New Year" | ABBA |
