= Greed (song) =

2001 single by Godsmack

Single by Godsmack

from the album Awake
- Released: May 17, 2001
- Recorded: 2000
- Length: 3:29
- Label: Republic/Universal
- Songwriter: Sully Erna
- Producers: Sully Erna; Mudrock

Godsmack singles chronology
"Bad Magick" (2001)	"Greed" (2001)	"I Stand Alone" (2002)

Music video
- "Greed" on YouTube

"Greed" is a song by the band Godsmack. It served as the third and final single from their second album, Awake, released in May 17, 2001.

== Background ==
In a May 2001 article in Penthouse, journalist David John Farinella discussed a dispute involving a person who had lent Godsmack money to record their original demo, All Wound Up.... According to the report, the lender later sued the band, claiming a 10% ownership stake. The dispute was described as one of the band's early negative experiences following its success.

In an April 2001 interview with Friday Morning Quarterback, frontman Sully Erna explained the personal motivation behind the song, saying of the former friend involved in the dispute: "He basically traded his friendship for money. He's no longer a friend and I get a great song out of it."

== Music video ==
The music video was directed by Sully Erna and Troy Smith. It combines performance footage with a fictional narrative. The woman seen on the album cover of Godsmack's self-titled debut makes a brief cameo at the very beginning of the video. Erna described in a Fuse TV interview the difficulty they had in tracking her down for the role.

The video has the band living in a rundown apartment owned by a rich, unsympathetic landlord. The group finally has enough of their poor living conditions and tramples the landlord at the end of the video, leaving him in a humorous slump in his underwear. The video frequently cuts between the story aspect to band performance, featuring the group dressing in black and silver, performing in a spacious silver room with the Godsmack logo imprinted on the floor.

The music video is rather unusual for Godsmack in that it follows an actual story rather than loosely connected elements and aesthetics. Also of note is its lighter, somewhat humorous nature compared to previous Godsmack videos. Erna stated that it was their attempt at fitting in with the more mainstream music video crowd and that he was not pleased with it.

== Awards and nominations ==
Year	Award	Category	Recipient
2001	Boston Music Awards	Single of the Year	Nominated
2001	Boston Music Awards	Video of the Year	Nominated

== Chart positions ==
Singles U.S. Billboard

Year	Chart	Position
2001	Mainstream Rock Tracks	3
2001	Modern Rock Tracks	28
2001	Billboard Hot 100	123
