= All Wound Up =

All Wound Up may refer to:

- All Wound Up..., an album by Godsmack
- All Wound Up (store), a defunct novelty and toy retailer
- "All Wound Up", a song by Quiet Riot from Down to the Bone
- "All Wound Up", a song by She Wants Revenge from Up and Down
