= All Wound Up... =

Studio album by Godsmack
- Released: February 1997
- Recorded: 1996
- Studio: New Alliance (Boston, Massachusetts)
- Genres: Alternative metal; hard rock; post-grunge
- Length: 54:28
- Label: E. K.
- Producers: Sully Erna; Mudrock

Godsmack chronology
All Wound Up... (1997)	Godsmack (1998)

Professional ratings
Review scores
Source	Rating
AllMusic	3/5 stars

All Wound Up... is the debut studio album by American rock band Godsmack. It was released independently through the band's own record label, E. K. Records Company, in February 1997. The album was pressed four different times before being picked up by Republic Records/Universal Records in June 1998. It was slightly edited and remixed (with some unlicensed samples removed), fully remastered and given a new artwork and layout, and re-released by the major record labels as Godsmack in August 1998. The band never considered this to be a demo release; they considered it the same release as Godsmack.

== Different editions ==
According to the album's liner notes, frontman Sully Erna performed all of the drums on the album because the band's original drummer, Tommy Stewart, had departed before the recording session. The band's second drummer, Joe D'Arco, only joined after the album was recorded, though he later recorded the bonus track "Whatever" with the band in February 1998. When D'Arco was fired in April 1998, his name was not removed from the 1998 re-presses of the album, but Stewart was eventually given credit when the album was re-issued as Godsmack.

Four different versions of this album exist. The first and the second edition only differ because of a member misprint in the booklet. The misprint of the first edition mentions "Tony" (Rombola) also on drums. That's corrected in the second edition, where you can read "Joe" (D'Arco) on drums. The third edition's characteristic feature is an added bonus CD with the track "Whatever" included on it. The fourth edition differs from all the others in two cases: The hidden track at the end of the eleventh track, "Witch Hunt", is removed and a twelfth track, "Whatever" (also not mentioned elsewhere on the release), is added. "Going Down" later appeared on the soundtrack to the film Mission: Impossible 2 as well as the band's second studio album Awake.

=== Track differences to the album Godsmack ===
Beside slight overall differences concerning the mix, there are some more significant differences between All Wound Up... and Godsmack.

- "Moon Baby": There are more people sounds in the part from 2:39 to 4:10.
- "Immune": The guitar sound at the end isn't fading out.
- "Time Bomb": The intro is mixed significantly louder.
- "Keep Away": This version is about 20 seconds longer, because the intro of "Situation" on Godsmack is put at the end of "Keep Away" here.
- "Situation": This version is about 20 seconds shorter, because the intro featured on Godsmack is missing here. It is put at the end of "Keep Away" instead.
- "Stress": No differences
- "Bad Religion": This version includes a spoken intro.
- "Get Up, Get Out": This version is about two minutes longer, because it includes the intro "Someone in London", that is a separate track on Godsmack.
- "Now or Never": No differences
- "Goin' Down": No differences to the version, which was released as a bonus track on the Japanese edition of Godsmack.
- "Voodoo": The vocals at the beginning are mixed more in the foreground significantly.
- "Witch Hunt" (hidden track on first, second and third edition): No differences
- "Whatever": No differences

== Track listing ==
No.	Title	Length
1.	"Moon Baby"	4:22
2.	"Immune"	4:47
3.	"Time Bomb"	3:56
4.	"Keep Away"	5:05
5.	"Situation"	5:31
6.	"Stress"	5:02
7.	"Bad Religion"	3:39
8.	"Get Up, Get Out!"	5:31
9.	"Now or Never"	5:04
10.	"Going Down"	3:29
11.	"Voodoo" (includes hidden track "Witch Hunt" on first, second and third edition, starting at 5:37)	4:36
Total length:		54:28

Bonus track (only on fourth edition)
No.	Title	Length
12.	"Whatever"	3:25

Bonus CD (only available with the third edition)
No.	Title	Length
12.	"Whatever"	3:25

== Personnel ==
- Sully Erna – vocals, guitar, drums (tracks 1–11)
- Tony Rombola – guitars, vocals
- Robbie Merrill – bass
- Joe D'Arco – drums (track 12 only)
