= Awake (Godsmack song) =

2000 single by Godsmack

Single by Godsmack

from the album Awake
- Released: June 20, 2000
- Recorded: River's Edge Productions Inc. (Haverhill, Massachusetts)
- Genre: Nu metal; post-grunge
- Length: 5:04 (album version) 4:33 (radio edit)
- Label: Universal
- Songwriter: Salvatore Erna
- Producers: Mudrock; Sully Erna

Godsmack singles chronology
"Bad Religion" (2000)	"Awake" (2000)	"Bad Magick" (2001)

Music video
- "Awake" on YouTube

"Awake" is the lead single and title track from Godsmack's second studio album. In the United States, "Awake" is perhaps best known for its use in the 2000s series of US Navy advertisements, "Accelerate Your Life", with voiceover by Keith David.

In 2013, the staff of Loudwire included the song's main riff in their list of "the 10 Best Metal Riffs of the 2000s". In 2024, the staff of Consequence included the song in their list of "50 Kick-Butt Post-Grunge Songs We Can Get Behind".

== Background ==
In an MTV online chat, Godsmack vocalist Sully Erna said that "Awake" is Godsmack "getting some closure, on a past relationship". Erna then said: "That's me getting closure on a relationship. I'm just saying that now I'm awake, and I'm able to deal with everything I have to deal with. Where before I felt like I was going to lose control without this person in my life. I'm saying that I'm okay now without that person".

== Release and commercial performance ==
"Awake" was released to radio on June 3, 2000. "Awake" achieved mainstream success. The song was on the Mainstream Rock chart for 53 weeks and peaked at number one, their first single to do so. "Awake" also was on the Alternative Songs chart for 28 weeks and peaked at number 12. "Awake" was on the Bubbling Under Hot 100 Singles chart for 24 weeks and peaked at number one on the chart in 2001. "Awake" was nominated for the Rock Single of the Year category at the 2001 Billboard Music Awards. With the popularity of "Awake", Godsmack's album of the same name was certified 2× Platinum by the RIAA in March 2002.

== Music video ==
The music video made for this single was filmed at the Ohio State Reformatory in Mansfield, Ohio. The video contains footage of prisoners rioting and leaving the reformatory, and seeing Godsmack play in the exercise yard inside a fenced-in area. The music video was produced by the band.

== Versions ==
There are three versions of "Awake", the first version, which is the original version, appeared on Godsmack second studio album, Awake. The second version is a radio edit which appeared on the single release of the song, and the third is an acoustic version called "Asleep", which appeared on their EP, The Other Side.

The radio edit is the same song as the album version, just shortened. The album and acoustic versions have very similar lyrics but different sound. The acoustic version runs for 3:58, making it closer to the radio edit than the full album version.

== Appearances ==
This song was featured prominently in the Nash Bridges episode "Manhunt" that first aired on November 3, 2000. It was also featured in the game Dave Mirra Freestyle BMX 2. The song is featured as DLC for Rock Band 4 released in 2015.

Since the mid-2000s, the song has been featured extensively in the U.S. Navy's "Accelerate Your Life" commercials. The Godsmack album Awake's opening track, "Sick of Life," would also be used in the campaign.

The song also made an appearance on several compilations including the band greatest hits album, Good Times, Bad Times... Ten Years of Godsmack, WWF Tough Enough, Kerrang: Life Is Loud, and Crusty Demons: Unleash Hell.

The song features as the background track in the promos of the 2006 Bollywood film Fight Club.

== U.S. Navy support ==
Although the song was featured in the United States Navy's "Accelerate Your Life" commercials, Erna insists that Godsmack doesn't support any war: "By no means has this band ever supported any war for any country or that we support government decisions or why we're sticking our nose in other people's business at times. What we support is our troops. And the women and men that go over there — or anywhere — to fight for our country and our lives and protect our freedom and I feel that."

"I actually sympathize with a lot of the soldiers, and the military in general, that are trained to go out and protect for us, and what they have to go through, it's really kind of shitty in a sense that these young kids have to go over there and die, sometimes, for something that isn't our problem. And that kind of sucks. So what I have to do is at least support them, because they don't have the choice that we do."

Some critics say that the band's young audience would be influenced to join the military because of the popular tunes. However, Erna expressed doubt that someone would join the Marines or the Navy because they heard Godsmack as the underlying music in the commercial.

== Track listing ==
No.	Title	Length
1.	"Awake (radio edit)"	4:33
2.	"Awake (LP version)"	5:04
3.	"Why"	3:15
4.	"Time Bomb"	3:59

== Chart positions ==
Chart (2000–01)	Peak position
Billboard Mainstream Rock Tracks	1
Billboard Modern Rock Tracks	12
Billboard Bubbling Under Hot 100 Singles	1

== Bibliography ==
- Vernallis, Carol; Herzog, Amy; Richardson, John (2013). The Oxford Handbook of Sound and Image in Digital Media. Oxford University Press. pp. 315–316. ISBN 9780199757640.
