= Awake (Godsmack album) =

Studio album by Godsmack
- Released: October 31, 2000
- Recorded: 1999–2000
- Studio: River's Edge Productions Inc. (Haverhill, Massachusetts)
- Genre: Alternative metal; hard rock; nu metal
- Length: 45:29
- Label: Universal; Republic
- Producer: Mudrock; Sully Erna

Godsmack chronology
| Godsmack (1998) | Awake (2000) | Faceless (2003) |

Singles from Awake
- 1. "Awake" Released: June 20, 2000; 2. "Bad Magick" Released: February 22, 2001; 3. "Greed" Released: May 17, 2001

Professional ratings
Review scores
| Source | Rating |
|---|---|
| AllMusic | 3/5 stars |
| Entertainment Weekly | (C−) |
| Robert Christgau | (dud) |
| Rolling Stone | 2/5 stars |
| Q | (6/01, p.106) |

Awake is the third studio album by American rock band Godsmack, released on October 31, 2000. It features the song "Goin' Down", which first appeared on the band's first studio recording, All Wound Up. It is the final Godsmack album to fully include drummer Tommy Stewart, who would be replaced by former drummer Shannon Larkin afterwards. (Note: Stewart's final work with the band was on the "I Stand Alone" single. The remaining songs on Faceless were done by Erna and Larkin.)

During the 2000s, the songs "Sick of Life" and "Awake" were used for the United States Navy's "Accelerate Your Life" recruiting advertisements.

== Recording ==
The band opted to convert a warehouse in Haverhill, Massachusetts into a makeshift studio, rather than use a more traditional studio setting. According to Sully Erna, the band just did not want to move into any luxurious studio, because they wanted to keep the edge on for writing and "not get too far away from what we're all about". So they just stayed in the slums rather than moving into luxury.

Erna says the results show in the music's "tougher" sound; "however, it has a very raw edge to it. It's not very polished," he says. "But it still has a lot of good grooves, and it still has a lot of power."

The band also kept in touch with its roots by working some older unreleased material. The album includes older songs that just missed being on the debut. "Goin' Down" is a track from the original Godsmack album that was dropped in favor of "Whatever" for the major-label release. The songs "Bad Magick" and "Vampires" also date back to the same period.

== Release ==
Awake debuted at number five on the Billboard 200, selling 256,000 copies in its first week, and the album would go on to sell at least 2,000,000 copies in the United States.

Since its release, the album's title track dominated rock radio and broke chart records throughout 2000 and 2001. The album's spoken word track "Vampires" earned the band its first Grammy nomination. In 2001, Awake won the Boston Music Award for Album of the Year. "Greed" earned the band Boston Music Awards nominations for single and video of the year.

== Track listing ==
All lyrics are written by Sully Erna, except where noted.

| No. | Title | Music | Length |
|---|---|---|---|
| 1. | "Sick of Life" | Erna | 3:53 |
| 2. | "Awake" | Erna | 5:05 |
| 3. | "Greed" | Erna | 3:30 |
| 4. | "Bad Magick" | Erna | 4:18 |
| 5. | "Goin' Down" | Erna; Tony Rombola; Robbie Merrill | 3:24 |
| 6. | "Mistakes" | Erna; Rombola | 5:58 |
| 7. | "Trippin'" | Erna; Rombola | 4:57 |
| 8. | "Forgive Me" | Erna | 4:18 |
| 9. | "Vampires" (instrumental, contains dialogue from the television show Mysterious Forces Beyond) | Erna; Merrill | 3:48 |
| 10. | "The Journey" (instrumental) | Erna; Rombola | 0:50 |
| 11. | "Spiral" | Erna; Rombola | 5:38 |
| Total length: | | | 45:30 |

Japanese edition bonus tracks
| No. | Title | Writer(s) | Length |
|---|---|---|---|
| 12. | "Why" | Erna | 3:15 |
| 13. | "Sweet Leaf" (Black Sabbath cover) | Tony Iommi; Ozzy Osbourne; Geezer Butler; Bill Ward | 4:55 |
| Total length: | | | 53:40 |

== Personnel ==
Godsmack

- Sully Erna – vocals, rhythm guitar, drums
- Tony Rombola – lead guitar, backing vocals
- Robbie Merrill – bass, backing vocals
- Tommy Stewart – drums

Additional performances

- Katrina Chester – vocals on "The Journey" and "Spiral"

Production

- Produced by Sully Erna and Murdock
- Engineered by Mudrock, except "Vampires", recorded by Cameron Webb
- Additional engineering by Nate Dube
- Mixed by Mudrock, except "Mistakes" and "Goin' Down" (mixed by Mudrock and Jay Baumgardner), and "Vampires" and "Bad Magick" (mixed by Jay Baumgardner)
- Mastered by Ted Jensen
- Photography by Clay Patrick McBride and Ian Barrett

== Charts ==
=== Weekly charts ===
| Chart (2000) | Peak position |
|---|---|
| Austrian Albums (Ö3 Austria) | 26 |
| Canadian Albums (Billboard) | 9 |
| German Albums (Offizielle Top 100) | 59 |
| New Zealand Albums (RMNZ) | 38 |
| US Billboard 200 | 5 |

=== Year-end charts ===
| Chart (2000) | Position |
|---|---|
| Canadian Albums (Nielsen SoundScan) | 198 |

| Chart (2001) | Position |
|---|---|
| US Billboard 200 | 55 |

=== Singles ===
| Year | Song | Chart | Peak position |
|---|---|---|---|
| 2000 | "Awake" | Hot Mainstream Rock Tracks | 1 |
| 2000 | "Awake" | Alternative Songs | 12 |
| 2001 | "Bad Magick" | Hot Mainstream Rock Tracks | 12 |
| 2001 | "Bad Magick" | Alternative Songs | 28 |
| 2001 | "Greed" | Hot Mainstream Rock Tracks | 3 |
| 2001 | "Greed" | Alternative Songs | 28 |

== Certifications ==
| Region | Certification | Certified units/sales |
|---|---|---|
| Canada (Music Canada) | Platinum | 100,000^{^} |
| United States (RIAA) | 2× Platinum | 2,500,000 |
^{^} Shipments figures based on certification alone.

== Release history ==
| Country | Date | Label |
|---|---|---|
| United States | October 31, 2000 | Uptown/Universal |
| Japan | March 23, 2001 | Universal International |
