= Siv Pettersson =

Swedish singer

- Birth name: Siv Margaretha Pettersson
- Born: 3 March 1955; Stockholm, Sweden
- Died: 12 January 1975 (aged 19); Malmö, Sweden
- Genres: Schlager
- Occupation: Singer-songwriter
- Instrument(s): Vocals, guitar
- Years active: 1971–1975

Siv Margaretha Pettersson (3 March 1955 – 12 January 1975) was a Swedish singer, best known for her Christmas song "Låt mig få tända ett ljus (Schlafe, mein Prinzchen, schlaf' ein)".

Petterson was born in Saint Matthew Parish, Stockholm. She had a major 1972–1973 Christmas hit with "Låt mig få tända ett ljus" and a minor 1974 success with Evert Taube's "Så länge skutan kan gå". She died in a road accident in Årjäng, Värmland County, in January 1975, aged 19.

== Discography ==
=== Albums ===
- Siv Pettersson – 1972
- I dur och moll – 1973
- Låt mig få tända ett ljus, compilation album (1977)

=== Singles ===
- Vår egen bit av världen/Vem är du och vem är jag – 1972
- Sommar kom, vinter gå/Jag går i tusen tankar – 1973
- Qua la linta/Jag fallre för trumpet – 1973
- Nu är det din tur/Så länge skutan kan gå – 1974
- Jag längtar bara efter att få komma hem/Det måste finnas någon värld – 1974

== Svensktoppen songs ==
- Låt mig få tända ett ljus (Schlafe, mein Prinzchen, schlaf' ein) – 1972-1973
- Det måste finnas någon värld – 1974
- Så länge skutan kan gå – 1974
