= Laurie Cabot =

American high priestess, writer (born 1933)

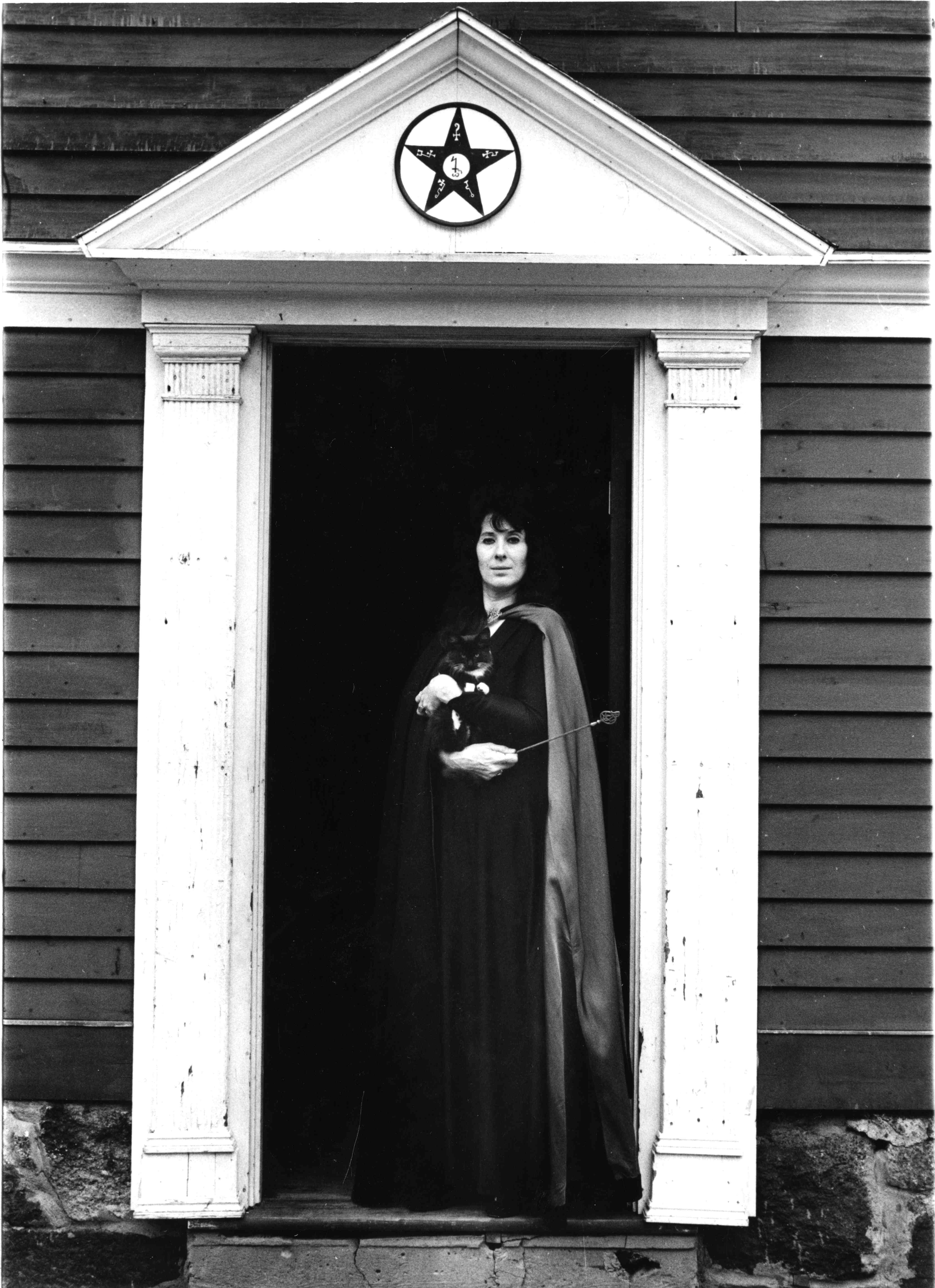
- Born: Mercedes Elizabeth Keirsey; March 6, 1933 (age 93); Wewoka, Oklahoma, U.S.
- Occupation: Witchery priestess
- Years active: 1949–present
- Children: 2

Laurie Cabot (born March 6, 1933) is an American Witchcraft high priestess, and the author of several books. She founded the Cabot Tradition of the Science of Witchcraft and the Witches' League for Public Awareness to defend the civil rights of witches everywhere. She lives in Salem, where she owned a shop. Cabot claims to be related to the prominent Boston Brahmin Cabot family.

== Life and career and possible inspirations ==
Laurie Cabot was born Mercedes Elizabeth Kiersey. She grew up in California and came east to New England as a teenager. She maintains that her interest in the occult began in childhood. She developed this interest in Boston through time she spent as a young woman in the halls of the Boston Public Library.

Cabot married and divorced twice, with each marriage producing a daughter. Cabot chose to raise her daughters as Witches, and she began appearing in black robes and black eye-makeup in her everyday life. She identifies herself as a witch. The kind of witchcraft that Cabot practices focuses on the religion, art and science of witchcraft. 1970 TV's sitcom Bewitched visited Salem for a series of episodes with location filming. Laurie Cabot opened the town's first "Witch Shoppe" in Salem in 1971, which became a tourist destination thanks to the national TV exposure.

In 1986, after the release of the film version of The Witches of Eastwick, John Updike's novel about single suburban women venturing into the occult, Cabot established the Witches' League for Public Awareness to counter negative images of her religion in popular culture and the media. "Here are three women who have nothing better to do, because they are so frustrated sexually, than to get involved with witchcraft," Cabot said of the movie. "They are not witches. If they are anything, they are weekend Satanists. They don't do one witchy thing in the whole film."

Cabot's shop sold herbs, jewelry, Tarot decks, and other items used in witchcraft. She later moved her shop to an old gambrel-roofed house on Essex Street. This new shop was named Crow Haven Corner. The physical store is still open, but is no longer owned or managed by any member of the Cabot family (formerly, her eldest daughter Jody owned and ran it). Cabot's final shop in Salem, The Cat, the Crow and the Crown on Pickering Wharf, later renamed The Official Witch Shoppe, closed its doors in February 2012. Cabot still maintains an online business and sells her hand-crafted magic products at Enchanted, a witch shoppe on Pickering Wharf in Salem.

In March 2008, Cabot celebrated her 75th birthday at a surprise birthday party that was attended by hundreds of witches, including Sully Erna of the band Godsmack, for whom Cabot had appeared in the band's "Voodoo" music video, shot at Hammond Castle.

== Publications ==
- The Power of the Witch: The Earth, the Moon, and the Magical Path to Enlightenment (1990)
- Love Magic (with Tim Cowan) (1992)
- Celebrate the Earth: A Year of Holidays in the Pagan Tradition (1994).
- The Witch in Every Woman: Reawakening the Magical Nature of the Feminine to Heal, Protect, Create, and Empower (1997)
- Laurie Cabot's Book of Shadows by Laurie Cabot (Author), Penny Cabot (Author), Christopher Penczak (Author) (October 29, 2015)
- Laurie Cabot's Book of Spells & Enchantments by Laurie Cabot (Author), Penny Cabot (Author), Christopher Penczak (Author)
