= Vitamin String Quartet =

Musical group

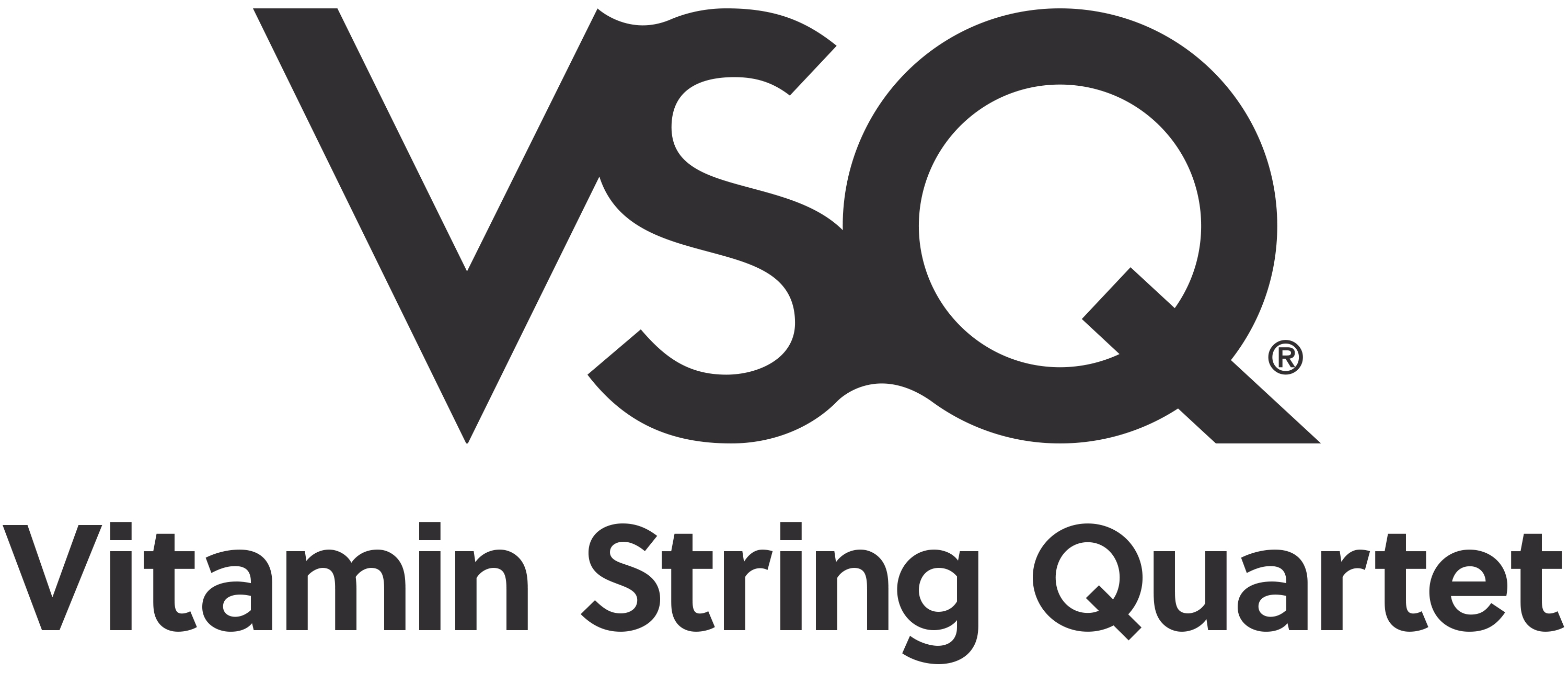

Background information
- Also known as: VSQ
- Origin: Los Angeles, California, U.S.
- Genre: Modern classical
- Years active: 1999–present
- Label: Vitamin
- Website: vitaminstringquartet.com

Vitamin String Quartet (VSQ) is an American musical group from Los Angeles known for its series of tribute albums to rock and pop acts.

VSQ is a series of string quartet projects developed and produced by CMH Records, an independent record company based in Los Angeles. The CMH team works with an evolving cast of arrangers, producers, string players, and other creatives on each project. Their albums are released through Vitamin Records and are primarily performed by a string quartet, although other instruments have been used. "Vitamin String Quartet is about applying rock n' roll attitude to classical technique," said Tom Tally, a violist and arranger who has performed on and produced over 50 Vitamin String Quartet albums.

Their albums feature various genres, including pop and rock, metal, emo, punk, techno, country, and hip-hop, and a wide variety of groups, such as Coldplay, the Beach Boys, Gorillaz, The Beatles, Iron Maiden, Bruce Springsteen, Jimi Hendrix, the Smashing Pumpkins, and Lana Del Rey, among others. Their discography includes over 400 albums.

== History ==
The group began in 1999 "as an experiment in transforming rock and pop songs with classical instruments." It later expanded to include a variety of popular music.

From 2012 until 2014, their music was played 24 hours a day on the FM broadcast station WWHK in Concord, New Hampshire.

In 2008, VSQ contributed a recording of "Jack and Sally Montage" to Nightmare Revisited, on which the original score for the 1993 film The Nightmare Before Christmas was reinterpreted by bands like Tiger Army, the All-American Rejects, Plain White T's, Rise Against, and DeVotchKa.

In June 2009, they branched out by including a few original songs on their album Perversions, which also included covers of bands such as Broken Social Scene, No Age, and Sigur Rós.

Although the group's lineup has been rotating since its creation, the current lineup(circa 2025) includes Tom Lea as the violist, Wynton Grant and Rachel Grace on violin, and Derek Stein on the cello.

== Movie features ==
Vitamin String Quartet covered INXS's "Never Tear Us Apart" and Pat Benatar's "We Belong" in the 100th episode of Gossip Girl.

Vitamin String Quartet's cover of Nine Inch Nails' "Something I Can Never Have" was featured in the fifth episode of the first season of the HBO series Westworld, "Contrapasso", and their cover of Radiohead's "Motion Picture Soundtrack" was featured in episode six, "The Adversary".

Vitamin String Quartet's cover of the Red Hot Chili Peppers "Scar Tissue" was featured on the soundtrack of King of Staten Island in 2020.

Vitamin String Quartet has many covers featured in the Netflix series Bridgerton, such as Nirvana's "Stay Away" and Robyn's "Dancing on My Own". Covers of Billie Eilish's "Bad Guy" and Lady Gaga's "Poker Face" were used in the 2024 Doctor Who episode "Rogue," serving as an homage to Bridgerton.

== Partial discography ==
=== 0–9 ===
- The String Quartet Tribute to 3 Doors Down
- The String Quartet Tribute to 311

=== A ===
- Back in Baroque: The String Quartet Tribute to AC/DC
- Vitamin String Quartet Performs AC/DC
- Vitamin String Quartet Performs Adele's Skyfall (single release)
- Vitamin String Quartet Performs Adele
- Vitamin String Quartet Performs Adele's Rumour Has It (single release)
- The String Quartet Tribute to Aerosmith
- String Quartet Tribute to AFI
- The String Quartet Tribute to Alice in Chains
- Precious Things: The String Quartet Tribute to Tori Amos (2001)
- Pieces: The String Quartet Tribute to Tori Amos, Vol. 2 (2007)
- String QuaTributeibute to Animal Collective: Banshee Beat
- Vitamin String Quartet Performs As I Lay Dying's An Ocean Between Us
- Vitamin String Quartet Performs Arcade Fire
- String Quartet Tribute to Arcade Fire's Funeral
- String Quartet Tribute to Atreyu
- String Quartet Tribute to Audioslave
- String Quartet Tribute to Avicii's Wake Me Up
- String Quartet Tribute to Avenged Sevenfold

=== B ===
- The String Quartet Tribute to Bad Religion: History Repeating
- String Quartet Tribute to Bastille's Pompeii
- The String Quartet Tribute to The Beach Boys' Pet Sounds
- The String Quartet Tribute to The Beatles
- Vitamin String Quartet Performs The Beatles Vol. 2
- The String Quartet Tribute to Björk
- The String Quartet Tribute To Björk: The Remixes
- Ice - The String Tribute To Björk
- The String Quartet Tribute to Black Sabbath
- The String Quartet Tribute to Blue October
- The String Quartet Tribute to Bob Dylan
- The String Quartet Tribute to Bon Jovi: Count Me In
- The String Quartet Tribute to Breaking Benjamin
- The String Quartet Tributes to Bright Eyes' Beautiful in the Morning
- The String Quartet Tribute to Jimmy Buffett
- The String Quartet Performs Bush
- Vitamin String Quartet Performs Blink 182
- Vitamin String Quartet Performs Bon Iver
- VSQ Performs The Black Keys

=== C ===
- String Quartet Tribute to Casting Crowns
- An Evening with Diablo: The String Tribute to Chevelle
- String Quartet Tribute to Coheed and Cambria's In Keeping Secrets of Silent Earth: 3
- String Quartet Tribute to Coldplay
- String Quartet Tribute to Coldplay, Vol. 2.
- Vitamin String Quartet Performs Coldplay's Viva la Vida
- Vitamin String Quartet Performs Coldplay's Mylo Xyloto
- String Quartet Tribute to The Cure
- Vitamin String Quartet Performs Chandelier by Sia

=== D ===
- String Quartet Tribute to The Dark Side of the Moon
- The String Quartet Tribute to Dashboard Confessional: B-Sides of the String Sessions
- Songs You Have Come to Love The Most: A String Quartet Tribute to Dashboard Confessional
- String Quartet Tribute to Daughtry
- String Quartet Tribute to Dave Matthews Band
- String Quartet Tribute to David Bowie
- String Quartet Tribute to David Gray
- Ghost: The String Quartet Tribute to Death Cab for Cutie
- Vitamin String Quartet Performs The Decemberists
- String Quartet Tribute to Deftones
- String Quartet Tribute to Depeche Mode
- String Quartet Tribute to Dido
- Are You Breathing: The String Quartet to Disturbed
- String Quartet Tribute to The Doors
- The String Quartet Tribute to Dream Theater
- String Quartet Tribute to Duran Duran
- String Quartet Tribute to DragonForce
- String Quartet Tribute to DragonForce: Through the Fire and the Flames
- Crenshaw Classics: The String Quartet Tribute to Dr. Dre
- The String Quartet Tribute to Disturbed

=== E ===
- String Quartet Tribute to The Eagles
- String Quartet Tribute to Eric Clapton
- Immortalized: The String Quartet Tribute to Evanescence
- The String Quartet Tribute to Evanescence
- The String Quartet Tribute to Elliott Smith
- The String Quartet Tribute to Eminem

=== F ===
- String Quartet Tribute to Fall Out Boy
- String Quartet Tribute to Fall Out Boy Vol. 2
- Strung Out on Fiona Apple: A String Quartet Tribute
- String Quartet Tribute to Finger Eleven
- String Quartet Tribute to The Flaming Lips
- String Quartet Tribute to Fleetwood Mac
- Rumours: The String Quartet Tribute to Fleetwood Mac
- Vitamin String Quartet Performs the Tribute to Flyleaf
- The Magnificent Seven Series: Strung Out on Foo Fighters [EP]
- Shape and Colour of My Heart: The String Quartet Tribute to Foo Fighters
- Unravel: The String Quartet Tribute to The Fray

=== G ===
- String Quartet Tribute to Peter Gabriel
- String Quartet Tribute to Garbage
- String Quartet Tribute to Godsmack's Godsmack (2008)
- Anthem: The String Quartet Tribute to Good Charlotte
- Vitamin String Quartet Performs Gorillaz
- Vitamin String Quartet Performs Gotye's Somebody That I Used To Know
- Vitamin String Quartet performs Green Day's American Idiot
- String Quartet Tribute to Green Day's When I Come Around
- String Quartet Tribute to Guns N' Roses The Dutchman
- String Quartet Tribute to Guns N' Roses

=== H ===
- String Quartet Tribute to PJ Harvey
- Arteries Untold: The String Quartet Tribute to Hawthorne Heights
- String Quartet Tribute to Jimi Hendrix
- Uninhibited: String Quartet Tribute to Hinder
- Leave Nothing Behind: Strung Out on Hoobastank - The String Quartet Tribute
- The String Quartet Tribute to HIM

=== I ===
- Vitamin String Quartet Performs Imogen Heap
- VSQ Performs Imagine Dragons
- String Quartet Tribute to Incubus
- New Skin: The String Quartet Tribute to Incubus Vol. 2
- Vitamin String Quartet Tribute to Incubus Vol. 3
- Anatomy of Evil - The String Quartet Tribute to Iron Maiden
- Interstellar: The String Quartet Tribute to Interpol
- Strung Out on INXS: The String Quartet Tribute

=== J ===
- String Quartet Tribute to James Blunt
- String Quartet Tribute to Jane's Addiction
- String Quartet Tribute to Jet
- String Quartet Tribute to Elton John
- String Quartet Tribute to John Lennon
- Vitamin String Quartet Performs Jason Mraz
- Vitamin String Quartet Performs Jason Mraz's I Won't Give Up
- VSQPerformss the Hits of Michael Jackson
- String Quartet Tribute to Jeff Buckley

=== K ===
- The String Quartet Tribute to Kanye West
- String Quartet Tribute to Kasabian: Processed Strings
- The String Quartet Tribute to The Killers
- String Quartet Tribute to Kiss
- Hurt Inside: A String Quartet Tribute to KoЯn

=== L ===
- VSQ Performs Lady Gaga
- String Quartet Tribute to Lacuna Coil: Spiral Sounds
- Baroque Tribute to Led Zeppelin
- String Quartet Tribute to Led Zeppelin
- String Quartet Tribute to Led Zeppelin Vol. 2
- Break Stuff: The String Quartet Tribute to Limp Bizkit
- In the Chamber with Linkin Park: The String Quartet Tribute
- String Quartet Tribute to Linkin Park's Meteora
- String Quartet Tribute to Linkin Park's Minutes to Midnight
- Vitamin String Quartet Performs Lady Gaga's Born This Way
- Vitamin String Quartet Performs Linkin Park's A Thousand Suns
- String Quartet Tribute to Lynyrd Skynyrd - This Sweet Home
- String Quartet Tribute to Lorde's Royals
- String Quartet Tribute to Lana Del Rey's Summertime Sadness

=== M ===
- A Taste of Chaos Ensemble Performs Mastodon's Leviathan
- String Quartet Tribute to Madonna
- String Quartet Tribute to Paul McCartney
- String Quartet Tribute to Sarah McLachlan
- String Quartet Tribute to Moby
- String Quartet Tribute to Marilyn Manson
- Under Your Skin: The String Quartet Tribute to Maroon 5
- String Quartet Tribute to The Mars Volta's De-Loused In The Comatorium
- String Quartet Tribute to Massive Attack
- String Quartet Tribute to Matchbox Twenty
- Heavier Strings: A String Quartet Tribute to John Mayer’s Heavier Things
- Say Your Prayers, Little One: The String Quartet Tribute to Metallica
- The String Quartet Tribute to Morrissey
- String Quartet Tribute to Alanis Morissette
- Strung Out On Jagged Little Pill: The String Quartet Tribute to Alanis Morissette
- String Quartet Tribute to Muse
- VSQ Performs Muse's Survival
- Funeral: The String Quartet Tribute to My Chemical Romance

=== N ===
- String Quartet Tribute to New Order & Joy Division
- Someday: The String Quartet Tribute to Nickelback
- String Quartet Tribute to Nine Inch Nails
- Pretty Hate Machine: The String Quartet Tribute to Nine Inch Nails
- String Quartet Tribute to Nirvana
- String Quartet Tribute to Nirvana's Nevermind
- String Quartet Tribute to No Doubt
- Vitamin String Quartet Performs Nickelback, Volume 2

=== O ===
- VSQ Performs Frank Ocean
- String Quartet Tribute to The Offspring
- Decadence & Vanity: The String Quartet Tribute to Oasis
- Vitamin String Quartet Performs Owl City's Fireflies
- String Quartet Tribute to OneRepublic

=== P ===
- Strung Out on Panic! at the Disco: A String Quartet Tribute
- String Quartet Tribute to Panic! at the Disco's Pretty. Odd.
- Perfect Murder: Strung Out on Papa Roach
- String Quartet Tribute to Passenger (singer)'s Let Her Go
- The Magnificent Seven Series: The String Quartet Tribute to Paramore [EP]
- Strung Out on Paramore: String Quartet Tribute to Paramore
- Vitamin String Quartet Performs Paramore's Brand New Eyes
- The String Quartet Tribute to Pearl Jam
- Mad World: Strung Out on Pearl Jam: A String Quartet Tribute
- Vitamin String Quartet: Perversions
- Fervent: String Quartet Tribute to A Perfect Circle
- The String Quartet Tribute to A Perfect Circle
- The String Quartet Tribute to Phish
- String Quartet Tribute to Pink Floyd
- More Bricks: The String Quartet Tribute to Pink Floyd's The Wall
- String Quartet Tribute to Pink Floyd's The Dark Side of the Moon
- Vitamin String Quartet Performs Weezer's Pinkerton
- String Quartet Tribute to Pixies
- Revolution: The String Quartet Tribute to P.O.D.
- Symphonic Tribute to Purple Rain
- Vitamin String Quartet Performs Prince (2023)
- The String Quartet Tribute to Puddle Of Mudd

=== Q ===
- String Quartet Tribute to Queen
- Strings For The Deaf: The String Quartet Tribute to Queens of the Stone Age
- String Quartet Tribute to Queens of the Stone Age Vol.2

=== R ===
- Enigmatic: The String Quartet Tribute to Radiohead
- Strung Out on Kid A: The String Quartet Tribute to Radiohead
- Strung Out on In Rainbows: Vitamin String Quartet Performs Radiohead's In Rainbows
- Strung Out on OK Computer: The String Quartet Tribute to Radiohead
- Freedom: Tribute to Rage Against the Machine
- String Quartet Tribute to Red Jumpsuit Apparatus
- String Quartet Tribute to R.E.M.
- String Quartet Tribute to R.E.M. Vol. 2
- String Quartet Tribute to The Red Hot Chili Peppers
- String Quartet Tribute to Regina Spektor
- String Quartet Tribute to Relient K
- Vitamin String Quartet Tribute to Rise Against
- String Quartet Tribute to The Rolling Stones
- Exit... Stage Right: The String Quartet Tribute to Rush
- String Quartet Tribute to Rush’s 2112
- Through the Prism: The Classical Tribute to Rush

=== S ===
- Shake it Out- String Quartet Tribute to Florence + The Machine
- String Quartet Tribute to Santana
- String Quartet Tribute to Senses Fail
- Strung Out on Seether - The String Quartet Tribute
- String Quartet Tribute to Shinedown
- Vitamin String Quartet Tribute to Simple Plan
- VSQ Performs Sigur Ros
- Vitamin String Quartet Performs Skrillex
- The String Quartet Tribute to Slayer: The Death Angel Remains
- Evil You Dread: The String Quartet Tribute to Slayer
- String Quartet Tribute to Elliott Smith
- String Quartet Tribute to The Smiths
- String Quartet Tribute to Snow Patrol
- String Quartet Tribute to Sonic Youth
- Vitamin String Quartet Performs Soundgarden
- Hometown: The String Quartet Tribute to Bruce Springsteen
- In The Chamber with Staind: The String Quartet Tribute
- String Quartet Tribute to Gwen Stefani
- String Quartet Tribute to Switchfoot
- String Quartet Tribute to System of a Down
- The String Quartet Tribute to System of a Down's Mezmerize
- The String Quartet Tribute to System of a Down's Hypnotize
- String Quartet Tribute to The Smashing Pumpkins
- String Quartet Tribute to The Strokes
- String Quartet Tribute to Sum 41
- Sweater Weather - String Quartet Tribute to The Neighbourhood
- Stitches: Vitamin String Quartet Rendition to Shawn Mendes

=== T ===
- The Magnificent Seven Series: The String Quartet Tribute to Thrice [EP]
- Strung Out on Thrice: A String Quartet Tribute
- The String Quartet Tribute to Tool's Ænima
- Third Eye Open: The String Quartet Tribute to Tool
- Vitamin String Quartet Tribute to Tool's Lateralus
- Anatomical: The String Quartet Tribute to Tool
- Strung Out on Three Days Grace: A String Quartet Tribute
- Strung Out on Taking Back Sunday: A String Quartet Tribute
- The Vitamin String Quartet Tribute to Third Eye Blind
- The String Quartet Tribute to Thirty Seconds to Mars
- Vitamin String Quartet Performs Taylor Swift's Safe & Sound
- String Quartet Tribute to Train
- String Quartet Tribute to Tupac

=== U ===
- Strung Out on U2: The String Quartet Tribute
- Still Strung Out on U2: The String Quartet Vol. 2
- String Quartet Tribute to U2's The Joshua Tree
- The Vitamin String Quartet Plays U2's No Line on the Horizon
- Painted Red: Strung Out on Underoath
- Strung Out on The Used: The String Quartet Tribute

=== V ===
- String Quartet Tribute to The Velvet Underground & Nico
- Vitamin String Quartet Tribute to Vance Joy

=== W ===
- Dad, Get Me Out of This!: The String Quartet Tribute to Warren Zevon
- Vitamin String Quartet Performs We Belong
- Come on and Kick Me!: The String Quartet Tribute to Weezer
- Pull This String: String Quartet Tribute to Weezer (re-release)
- String Quartet Tribute to The White Stripes
- The String Quartet Tribute to The Who's Tommy
- Vitamin String Quartet Performs Amy Winehouse

=== Y ===
- Olympus: The String Quartet Tribute to Yanni
- String Quartet Tribute to Yellowcard
- Rusted Moon: The String Quartet Tribute to Neil Young

=== Miscellaneous and compilations ===
- Blood Curdling Strings: VSQ Pays Tribute to Horror Classics (2011)
- The Gay Wedding Collection (2008)
- The Geek Wedding Collection (2015)
- Geek Wedding 2: The Sequel (2016)
- Geek Wedding Forever Vol. 3 (2019)
- The Gothic Wedding Collection (2008)
- Modern Wedding Collection
- Modern Wedding Collection, Vol. 2
- My Metal Valentine (2008)
- The Rock 'n' Roll Wedding Collection (2008)
- The Rock 'n' Roll Valentine's Day Collection (2008)
- Songbirds: A VSQ Tribute to the Women of Modern Rock
- The String Quartet Tribute to Valentine's Day (2008)
- Strung Out Volume 1: The String Quartet Tribute to Modern Rock Hits
- Strung Out Volume 2: The String Quartet Tribute to Modern Rock Hits
- Strung Out Volume 3: The String Quartet Tribute to Alternative Rock Hits
- Strung Out Volume 4: The String Quartet Tribute to Hard Rock Hits
- Strung Out Volume 5: The String Quartet Tribute to 2007's Best Songs
- Strung Out Volume 6: The String Quartet Tribute to Music's Biggest Hits
- Strung Out Volume 7: The String Quartet Tribute
- Vitamin String Quartet Presents Strung Out Volume 8
- Vitamin String Quartet Presents Strung Out Volume 9
- Strung Out Vol. 10
- Strung Out Vol. 11: VSQ Tribute to Modern Rock Hits
- Strung Out on Indie Rock Vol. 1: The String Quartet Tribute (2008)
- The Tribute to Guitar Hero: Killer Tracks! (2008)
- Valentine's Day Massacre: The Emo Anti-Valentine's Day Collection (2008)
- The Vitamin String Quartet: The Tribute to Guitar Hero (2008)
- Vitamin String Quartet Performs the Hits of 2012, Vol. 1
- Vitamin String Quartet Performs The Hunger Games
- Vitamin String Quartet Performs Music from the Films of John Hughes
- Vitamin String Quartet Performs Music from the Films of Wes Anderson
- Vitamin String Quartet Performs the Songs from Glee (2009)
- Vitamin String Quartet Performs Music from Twilight (2008)
- Vitamin String Quartet Performs Music from Twilight Vol. 2 (2009)
- Vitamin String Quartet Tribute to Twilight: New Moon (2009)
- Vitamin String Quartet Tribute to Twilight: Eclipse (2010)
- Vitamin String Quartet Tribute to Twilight: Breaking Dawn – Part 1 (2011)
- Vitamin String Quartet Tribute to Twilight: Breaking Dawn – Part 2 (2012)
- Vitamin String Quartet Performs Power Ballads
- Vitamin String Quartet Tribute to Harry Potter (2010)
- Vitamin String Quartet Tribute to The Nightmare Before Christmas
- Vitamin String Quartet Tribute to Star Wars (2010)
- Vitamin String Quartet Tribute to the Ladies of 90s Alt Rock
- VSQ Tribute: 90s Rock Hits
- VSQ Tribute to Alternative Hits of the 90s
- Vitamin String Quartet Performs Modern Rock Hits 2011, Vol. 1
- Vitamin String Quartet Performs Modern Rock Hits 2011, Vol. 2
- VSQ Performs Modern Rock Hits 2012, Vol. 1
- VSQ Performs Modern Rock Hits 2012, Vol. 2
