= In the Name of Love: Artists United for Africa =

Compilation album by Various artists
- Released: January 27, 2004
- Recorded: June–October 2003
- Genres: Rock, contemporary Christian
- Label: Sparrow

Professional ratings
Review scores
Source	Rating
Jesus Freak Hideout	4/5 stars

In the Name of Love: Artists United for Africa is a benefit album, recorded by Christian bands, with a portion of the proceeds going to help cure the AIDS pandemic in Africa. All of the songs are covers of U2 songs.

== Track listing ==
1. "Sunday Bloody Sunday" – Pillar
2. "Beautiful Day" – Sanctus Real
3. "40" – Starfield
4. "Love Is Blindness" – Sixpence None the Richer
5. "Gloria" – Audio Adrenaline
6. "Grace" – Nichole Nordeman
7. "All I Want Is You" – Jars of Clay
8. "Mysterious Ways" – tobyMac & Sarah Kelly
9. "Pride (In the Name of Love)" – Delirious?
10. "One" – Tait
11. "With or Without You" – GRITS & Jadyn Maria
12. "When Love Comes to Town" – Todd Agnew
13. "Where the Streets Have No Name" – Chris Tomlin

== Awards and nominations ==
In 2004, 'Beautiful Day' by Sanctus Real was nominated for a Dove Award for Modern Rock Song of the Year.
