= Whatever (Godsmack song) =

Promotional single by Godsmack

from the album Godsmack
- Released: 1998
- Studio: New Alliance (Boston, Massachusetts)
- Genre: Hard rock
- Length: 3:25
- Label: Republic
- Songwriters: Sully Erna; Tony Rombola
- Producer: Sully Erna

Godsmack singles chronology
"Whatever" (1998)	"Keep Away" (1999)

Music video
- "Whatever" on YouTube

"Whatever" is a song by the American rock band Godsmack. It was released as a promotional single from the band's self-titled album. "Whatever" was also the longest-running song on the US Active Rock top 10 chart, remaining there for 33 weeks.

The song first appeared on a promotional bonus CD that came with some copies of All Wound Up.

== Song meaning ==
Lead singer Sully Erna and guitarist Tony Rombola wrote the song. Rombola said:

"That's Sully's answer to his girlfriend when we were going through the whole struggle between rehearsing five nights a week, playing on the weekends and trying to keep a relationship going at the same time. We were really starting to take off, and it's hard to go through a relationship with a girl and have a band take all your time, plus we worked regular jobs, so there was probably 10 minutes of the day for them."

== Legacy ==
In July 2019, "Whatever" was ranked at No. 55 on Spin's list of "The 69 Best Alternative Rock Songs of 1999".

== Charts ==
Singles U.S. Billboard

Year	Chart	Position
1998	Mainstream Rock	7
1998	Modern Rock Tracks	19
1998	Bubbling Under Hot 100	16
