= Zhi-Vago =

- Origin: Germany
- Genres: Dream trance
- Years active: 1996–2002
- Labels: Dance Street, House Nation

Zhi-Vago was a German dream trance music band, produced by Claudio Mangione and Gottfried Engels. Its most successful single was "Celebrate (The Love)", which was a top ten hit in France and Switzerland. The next singles, "Dreamer", was a moderate hit in France, while other ones, including a cover version of U2, passed almost unnoticed.

== Discography ==
=== Singles ===
Year	Single	Peak chart positions							Album
Year	Single	AUT	BEL (Vl)	BEL (Wa)	FRA	GER	NED	SUI	Album
1996	"Celebrate (The Love)"	15	16	25	8	18	36	9	Singles only
1996	"Dreamer"	—	—	—	30	49	—	—	Singles only
1996	"With or Without You"	—	—	—	—	—	—	—	Singles only
1997	"Teardrops from Heaven"	—	—	—	—	—	—	—	Singles only
2000	"On My Mind"	—	—	—	—	—	—	—	Singles only
"—" denotes releases that did not chart
