= Bad Religion (Godsmack song) =

Single by Godsmack

from the album Godsmack
- Released: 2000
- Genre: Alternative metal; nu metal
- Length: 3:14
- Label: Republic
- Songwriters: Sully Erna; Tommy Stewart
- Producers: Sully Erna; Murdock

Godsmack singles chronology
"Voodoo" (1999)	"Bad Religion" (2000)	"Awake" (2000)

"Bad Religion" is a song by American rock band Godsmack, released in 2000 as the fourth and final single from their self-titled second album (1999).

== Appearances ==
Following the September 11, 2001 attacks, radio conglomerate Clear Channel Communications issued the 2001 Clear Channel memorandum, a list of 150 songs Clear Channel recommended to be removed from airplay. "Bad Religion" was on the list.

== Personnel ==
- Sully Erna – vocals, rhythm guitar, drums
- Tony Rombola – lead guitars, additional vocals
- Robbie Merrill – bass
- Andrew Murdock – producer

== Chart positions ==
Singles U.S. Billboard

Year	Chart	Position
2000	Mainstream Rock Tracks	8
2000	Modern Rock Tracks	32
