= Absolute (record compilation) =

Absolute is the brand of a long-running series of compilation albums owned by the Swedish record company EVA Records. Initially, the only albums in the series were called Absolute Music, but starting in 1990 there have been other themed albums such as Absolute Dance and Absolute Rock.

== History ==
The first Absolute album, Absolute Music 1, was released on November 11, 1986. The idea to make a compilation with contemporary hits came from the president of Virgin Records, Anders Hjelmtorp, inspired by the successful Now! albums.

During the first years after 1986, the Absolute series was a pure collaboration between record companies Virgin, EMI and Elektra. In January 1990 EVA Records was started with Virgin, EMI and BMG as part-owners. In 1991 Warner also became a part-owner.

Since the start, new Absolute-albums have been released a few times each year. As of 2020, the latest album in the series is Absolute Music 89 which was a double album featuring artists like Carola, Zara Larsson and Shawn Mendes. Apart from the main albums in the series (Absolute Music) there have also been several themed albums. The first one was Absolute Italiana released May 14, 1990. Other examples of themed albums are:

- Absolute Dance
- Absolute Rock
- Absolute Love
- Absolute Reggae
- Absolute Christmas
- Absolute Summer
- Absolute Kidz
