= Juligen =

Single by Just D
- A-side: "Juligen"
- B-side: "Gummihatt"
- Released: December 1991
- Genre: Christmas, hip hop
- Label: Telegram
- Songwriters: Wille Crafoord, Peder Ernerot

"Juligen", also known as Nu är det juligen, is a hip hop Christmas song from 1991 by Just D, both released as a CD and vinyl single.

The song is a Christmas parody, and was released as a single in December 1991, peaking at second position at the Swedish singles chart. "Juligen" also stayed at Svensktoppen for three weeks during the period 15 December 1991-5 January 1992, with an 8th and 10th position.

According to STIM the song received second most radio airplay among Christmas songs of the 2000s in Sweden up to 2010.

== Charts ==
Chart (1992)	Peak position
Sweden (Sverigetopplistan)	2
