= Sick of Life =

Song by Godsmack

from the album Awake
- Released: October 31, 2000
- Recorded: 2000
- Genre: Nu metal
- Length: 3:52
- Label: Republic/Universal
- Songwriter: Sully Erna
- Producers: Sully Erna; Mudrock

"Sick of Life" is a song by American rock band Godsmack. It is the opening track of the band's second studio album, Awake.

== "Accelerate Your Life" commercials ==
In one of the recruitment advertisements, the beginning of "Sick of Life" plays in the background while scenes showing men dropping out of helicopters and scuba diving are juxtaposed with the image of a civilian's mundane life. The voice goes "And to think, somewhere, some poor guy is buying a mini van". Godsmack frontman Sully Erna told ArthurMag.com about the use of "Sick of Life" in U.S. Navy commercials:

The military came to us, believe it or not. Somebody in the Navy loves this band, because they used Awake for three years and then they came to us and re-upped the contract for another three years for 'Sick of Life.' So, I don't know. They just feel like that music, someone in that place thinks that the music is very motivating for recruit commercials I guess.

=== War support ===
However, Erna insists that Godsmack does not support any war:

By no means has this band ever supported any war for any country or that we support government decisions or why we're sticking our nose in other people's business at times. What we support is our troops. And the women and men that go over there — or anywhere — to fight for our country and our lives and protect our freedom and I feel that. I actually sympathize with a lot of the soldiers, and the military in general, that are trained to go out and protect for us, and what they have to go through, it's really kind of shitty in a sense that these young kids have to go over there and die, sometimes, for something that isn't our problem. And that kind of sucks. So what I have to do is at least support them, because they don't have the choice that we do.

Some critics say that the band's young audience will now be influenced to join the military because of the popular tunes. However, Erna doubts very seriously that a kid is going to join the Marines or the US Navy because he heard Godsmack as the underlying bed music in the commercial.
