= Keep Away (song) =

Promotional single by Godsmack

from the album Godsmack
- Released: June 1999
- Studio: New Alliance (Boston, Massachusetts)
- Genre: Nu metal
- Length: 4:49
- Label: Republic; Universal
- Songwriter: Sully Erna
- Producer: Sully Erna

Godsmack singles chronology
"Whatever" (1998)	"Keep Away" (1999)	"Voodoo" (1999)

Music video
- "Keep Away" on YouTube

"Keep Away" is a song by American rock band Godsmack. It was released as a promotional single from their self-titled album. An acoustic version of the song was included on the band's 2004 EP, The Other Side, while a live version of it was included on Woodstock '99's album. It also appears in the final moments of "The Fly", the sixth episode of the FX television series Alien: Earth.

Chad Childers of Loudwire noted the song brought early attention to the band: "With driving guitars, a sinister sounding vocal and aggressive chorus, the song connected with listeners and the Godsmack ascension was starting to take place. The song would impact radio in June 1999 and followed a more direct trajectory up the charts". The song's writer, band member Sully Erna, described the song as being "about hope -- hope to get the bitch out of my life".

== Track listing ==
No.	Title	Length
1.	"Keep Away" (Radio Edit)	3:59

== Charts ==
Chart (1999)	Position
US Mainstream Rock Tracks	5
US Modern Rock Tracks	31
