= Voodoo (Godsmack song) =

Single by Godsmack

from the album Godsmack
- Released: October 1999
- Studio: New Alliance (Boston, Massachusetts)
- Genre: Post-grunge
- Length: 4:39
- Label: Republic
- Songwriters: Sully Erna; Robbie Merrill
- Producer: Sully Erna

Godsmack singles chronology
| "Keep Away" (1999) | "Voodoo" (1999) | "Bad Religion" (2000) |

Music video
- "Voodoo" on YouTube

"Voodoo" is a song by American rock band Godsmack. It was released as the third single from their self-titled album. The song was written by the band's vocalist Sully Erna and bassist Robbie Merrill. "Voodoo" peaked at No. 6 on Billboard's Modern Rock Tracks chart. It also peaked at No. 5 on Billboard's Mainstream Rock chart.

"Voodoo" is the final track listed on the album. After roughly two minutes of silence, a hidden track (entitled "Witch Hunt") closes the album. Although "Voodoo" itself is 4:39 in length, the actual length (including the aforementioned silence and the hidden track "Witch Hunt") is 9:03.

"Voodoo" has since spawned a sequel, in the form of "Voodoo Too", from the band's fourth studio album, IV (2006).

== Music video ==
The music video, released in 1999, was directed by Dean Karr, and shows witches performing a ritual with swords. The band is shown throughout the video playing in a corn field. A naked gorgon is shown dancing, which is also part of the ritual. Zombies come out of a lake and wander through the woods. The video features Laurie Cabot and members of her coven at that time.

== Legacy ==
In 2024, the staff of Consequence included the song in their list of the "50 Best Post-Grunge Songs".

== Track listing ==
| No. | Title | Length |
|---|---|---|
| 1. | "Voodoo" (radio edit) | 4:14 |
| 2. | "Voodoo" (album version) | 4:39 |

== Charts ==
| Chart (1999–2000) | Peak position |
|---|---|
| US Bubbling Under Hot 100 (Billboard) | 2 |
| US Active Rock (Billboard) | 2 |
| US Alternative Airplay (Billboard) | 6 |
| US Mainstream Rock (Billboard) | 5 |

== Certifications ==
| Region | Certification | Certified units/sales |
|---|---|---|
| United States (RIAA) | Platinum | 1,000,000^{‡} |
^{‡} Sales+streaming figures based on certification alone.
