= We Will Follow: A Tribute to U2 =

1999 compilation album by various artists

Compilation album by Various
- Released: July 13, 1999
- Recorded: CTS Studios, London, May 1998
- Genre: Rock, alternative
- Label: Cleopatra Records

We Will Follow: A Tribute to U2 is a U2 tribute album recorded by various artists in May 1998. It was first released on July 13, 1999, and was re-released in 2006.

== Track listing ==
We Will Follow covers material from nine U2 albums: Boy, October, War, The Unforgettable Fire, The Joshua Tree, Rattle and Hum, Achtung Baby, Zooropa, and Pop.

Track no.	Title	Performed by	Length
1	"With or Without You"	Heaven 17	4:56
2	"One"	Information Society	4:59
3	"New Year's Day"	Front Line Assembly with Tiffany	5:00
4	"Pride"	Razed in Black	4:19
5	"Even Better Than the Real Thing"	Dead or Alive	4:25
6	"I Will Follow"	Spahn Ranch	3:37
7	"All I Want Is You"	Mission UK	5:00
8	"Sunday Bloody Sunday"	Electric Hellfire Club	4:29
9	"October"	Rosetta Stone	4:30
10	"Numb"	Die Krupps	4:33
11	"Where the Streets Have No Name"	Silverbeam with Ann Louise	3:46
12	"Even Better Than the Real Thing (Julian Beeston Mix)"	Bang Tango	4:54
13	"Desire"	The Polecats	3:26
14	"Discotheque (Suspiria Mix)"^{*}	Intra-Venus	5:00
