= Bad Magick =

2001 single by Godsmack

Single by Godsmack

from the album Awake
- Released: February 22, 2001
- Studio: River's Edge Productions Inc. (Haverhill, Massachusetts)
- Genre: Nu metal
- Length: 4:20 (album version); 3:36 (radio edit)
- Label: Republic/Universal
- Songwriter: Sully Erna
- Producers: Sully Erna; Andrew Murdock

Godsmack singles chronology
"Awake" (2000)	"Bad Magick" (2001)	"Greed" (2001)

Music video
- "Bad Magick" on YouTube

"Bad Magick" is a song by American rock band Godsmack, released in February 2001. It is featured on their second studio album, Awake, and is the only single by the band that's not included in their compilation album Good Times, Bad Times... Ten Years of Godsmack (2007).

== Music video ==
Godsmack started working on the video with director Troy Smith in Portland, Maine, on September 10, 2001 and planned to finish the outdoor shots the next day and the arena shots at a concert, but the events of September 11 put a halt to the band's plans. The video was set to feature the band playing at a cookout in front of a handful of apathetic crowd members and one Godsmack fanatic, who tries to rally the rest of the audience. As the enthused fan watches the performance, he imagines the band performing in huge arenas. The live performance segments were delayed when the band's shows were cancelled after September 11. Ultimately, Godsmack released the music video 23 years later, on May 30, 2024.

== Trivia ==
The song is featured in the 2002 compilation Wired-up.

== Chart positions ==
Singles U.S. Billboard

Year	Chart	Position
2001	Mainstream Rock Tracks	12
2001	Modern Rock Tracks	28

== Personnel ==
- Sully Erna – vocals, rhythm guitar, drums, producer
- Tony Rombola – lead guitars, additional vocals
- Robbie Merrill – bass
- Mudrock – producer
