= Godsmack (album) =

Studio album by Godsmack
- Released: August 25, 1998
- Recorded: 1996–1998
- Studio: New Alliance (Boston, Massachusetts)
- Genres: Alternative metal; hard rock; nu metal
- Length: 55:14
- Labels: Universal; Republic
- Producer: Mudrock

Godsmack chronology
All Wound Up (1997)	Godsmack (1998)	Awake (2000)

Singles from Godsmack
- 1. "Whatever" Released: August 25, 1998; 2. "Keep Away" Released: June 11, 1999; 3. "Voodoo" Released: October 20, 1999; 4. "Bad Religion" Released: February 15, 2000

Godsmack is the second studio album and major label debut by American rock band Godsmack. It was released by Republic Records and Universal Records on August 25, 1998. The album's recording was initially paid for by the band, at a cost of $2,600, at New Alliance Studios in Boston, and released through the band's own record label E. K. Records Company under the title All Wound Up... in February 1997. When the band was signed to Republic/Universal in June 1998, All Wound Up... was partly edited and remixed, fully remastered at Sterling Sound in New York, and given a new artwork and layout before being re-released.

The album was certified Gold on April 13, 1999, and Platinum on June 15, 1999, the latter only nine days after it was controversially banned from several leading chain stores due to questionable lyrics and imagery. A Parental Advisory sticker was quickly added before the album resumed distribution, ultimately reaching 5× Platinum on November 20, 2024.

== Background ==
The album differs from All Wound Up... by splitting the song "Get Up, Get Out!" into two tracks (the intro portion being re-titled "Someone in London"). "Whatever", which was recorded in February 1998 as a separate single and was added as a bonus track to later pressings of All Wound Up..., was edited into the album itself and served as the lead single after the reissue. The band had originally planned to keep "Whatever" for its next album (which later took shape as Awake), but included it on Godsmack. An entire sample lifted from the 1995 film Murder in the First, was removed from the ending of "Moon Baby" because actor Gary Oldman would not grant permission of its use. Another sample was also removed from the intro of "Bad Religion".

The song "Going Down" was removed from the main edition of Godsmack, though it was included as a bonus track on the Japanese edition. It was later re-recorded for the band's second major album Awake, under the slightly modified title "Goin' Down". Another song recorded at the same time as "Whatever" in February 1998, "Bad Magik", was only included as a Japanese bonus track on Godsmack, and was also later re-recorded for Awake, with the slightly modified title "Bad Magick".

Other minor changes were made to songs' beginning and end fades during the remastering. All Wound Up... was originally mastered by Jonathan Wyner at M-Works in Cambridge, Massachusetts, but Godsmack was remastered by Joseph M. Palmaccio at Sterling Sound in New York City. Erna played drums on all of the songs, except "Whatever" which featured Joe D'Arco. Nevertheless, Tommy Stewart is credited as drummer in the liner notes.

== Reception ==
Professional ratings
Review scores
Source	Rating
AllMusic	3/5 stars
Hip Online	7/10
Metal Hammer	7/10
The Rolling Stone Album Guide	3/5 stars

After playing the Boston area over the following two years, local radio stations WAAF, WBCN WFNX began playing the singles "Keep Away" and "Whatever", both of which helped the band to sell copies of their self-financed album All Wound Up. After the demand for their album became too high, Republic Records/Universal Records stepped in and signed the band to their label in 1998. The band replaced drummer Joe D'Arco with Tommy Stewart and All Wound Up was remastered and released six weeks later as Godsmack.

On November 20, 2024, the album was certified 5× Platinum by the RIAA.

Loudwire named Godsmack as one of the top 10 hard rock albums of 1998.

In 1999, the album won a Boston Music Award for Debut Album of the Year.

== Controversy ==
The album caused controversy due to its profane lyrics, and liner notes containing a Wiccan pentagram and reference to "Salem witches", minus a Parental Advisory warning label. After listening to his son's copy of the album, a father in the U.S. complained to Walmart, who sold him the album, that the lyrics were offensive. Walmart and Kmart took the album off the shelves. The band and its record label later added a Parental Advisory sticker to the album, and some stores ordered amended copies of the album. Erna commented on the situation to Rolling Stone magazine, stating, "Our record has been in the marketplace for more than a year now without a parental advisory sticker and this is the one and only complaint. Stickers and lyrics are by nature subjective. We have decided to put a sticker on the record." This controversy did not hurt album sales, but according to Erna, helped, stating, "It's almost taunting kids to go out and get the record to see what we're saying on it."

== Track listing ==
No.	Title	Writer(s)	Length
1.	"Moon Baby"	Sully Erna	4:23
2.	"Whatever"	Erna; Tony Rombola	3:26
3.	"Keep Away"	Erna	4:50
4.	"Time Bomb"	Erna	4:00
5.	"Bad Religion"	Erna; Tommy Stewart	3:14
6.	"Immune"	Erna; Robbie Merrill; Rombola	4:50
7.	"Someone in London" (instrumental)	Rombola	2:03
8.	"Get Up, Get Out!"	Erna	3:30
9.	"Now or Never"	Erna	5:06
10.	"Stress"	Erna	5:03
11.	"Situation"	Erna; Merrill	5:47
12.	"Voodoo" (the hidden track "Witch Hunt" begins at 6:39, after two minutes of silence)	Erna; Merrill	9:04
Total length:			55:14

Japanese edition bonus tracks
No.	Title	Writer(s)	Length
12.	"Going Down"	Erna; Rombola; Merrill	3:27
13.	"Bad Magick"	Erna	4:17
Total length:			62:53

Notes

- The Japanese bonus tracks are situated before "Voodoo" as tracks 12 and 13.
- Track 13 is an early version of "Bad Magick", later re-recorded and released on Awake.
- On some digital versions, the hidden track "Witch Hunt" is omitted from "Voodoo".
- On original pressings, "Bad Religion" has a length of 3:41.

== Personnel ==
=== Godsmack ===
- Sully Erna – lead vocals, rhythm guitar, drums, producer, additional percussion, additional keyboards
- Tony Rombola – lead guitar, backing vocals, additional percussion
- Robbie Merrill – bass, additional percussion
- Tommy Stewart – drums (credit only)
- Joe D'Arco – drums on "Whatever" (uncredited)

=== Others ===
- Andrew Murdock – co-production, engineering, additional percussion
- Joseph M. Palmaccio – mastering
- Toni Tiller – girl on CD layout
- Dale May – photography

== Charts ==
Album

Year	Chart	Peak position
1999	Heatseekers	2
1999	Billboard 200	22
2000	Catalog Albums Chart	1

Singles

Year	Song	Chart	Peak position
1999	"Whatever"	Hot Mainstream Rock Tracks	7
1999	"Whatever"	Alternative Songs	19
1999	"Keep Away"	Hot Mainstream Rock Tracks	5
1999	"Keep Away"	Alternative Songs	31
2000	"Voodoo"	Hot Mainstream Rock Tracks	5
2000	"Voodoo"	Alternative Songs	6
2000	"Bad Religion"	Hot Mainstream Rock Tracks	8
2000	"Bad Religion"	Alternative Songs	32

== Certifications ==
Region	Certification	Certified units/sales
Canada (Music Canada)	Gold	50,000^{^}
United States (RIAA)	5× Platinum	5,000,000^{‡}
^{^} Shipments figures based on certification alone.^{‡} Sales+streaming figures based on certification alone.

== Release history ==
Country	Date	Label
United States	August 25, 1998	Republic; Universal
Japan	May 30, 2000	Republic
