= Jacques Stotzem =

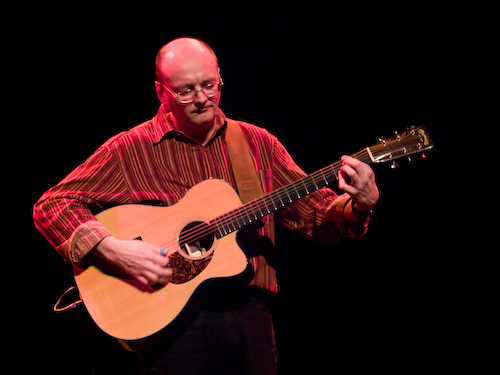
Jacques Stotzem

Jacques Stotzem (born 1959 in Verviers, Belgium) is a Belgian acoustic fingerstyle guitar player. He has recorded three vinyl albums and 17 CDs, and collaborated with numerous musical projects and other artists.

After having seen, at the age of 16, the American guitar player Stefan Grossman on TV, he taught himself to play the guitar and became a professional musician at the age of 19. He first played in bands and as an accompanist before starting a solo career.

Jacques Stotzem has developed a personal and harmonically refined style, drawing from many different sources such as blues, jazz, rock and folk. He plays with fingerpicks on the thumb and two fingers of the right hand, using the guitar to produce unusual percussive sounds and harmonic effects.

Jacques Stotzem has become a regular guest at the most important European and American festivals and tours around the world, including countries like Japan, China and Taiwan.

In 2003, the Northern Irish company Avalon Guitars introduced a "Jacques Stotzem Signature model" guitar. Since 2006, the C. F. Martin & Company has produced an "OMC Jacques Stotzem Custom Edition".

Jacques Stotzem is also co-founder (with Francis Geron) of the Verviers Guitar Festival.

== Discography ==
CDs

- 2021 - Handmade
- 2019 - Places we have been
- 2017 - The Way To Go
- 2016 - 25 Acoustic Music Years
- 2015 - To Rory - acoustic tribute to Rory Gallagher
- 2013 - Catch the spirit II
- 2011 - Lonely Road
- 2008 - Catch the spirit
- 2007 - Simple pleasure
- 2006 - Colours of Turner - duos with Andre Klenes (double bass)
- 2004 - In Concert (Live)
- 2002 - Sur Vesdre
- 1999 - Connections - with Jacques Pirotton (guitar) and Thierry Crommen (harmonica)
- 1997 - Fingerprint - with Thierry Crommen (saxophone)
- 1996 - Different Ways - duos with Thierry Crommen (harmonica)
- 1995 - Two Bridges - with Thierry Crommen (harmonica)
- 1993 - Straight On
- 1991 - Clear Night

Vinyl albums

- 1988 - Words from the heart
- 1985 - Training
- 1982 - Last thought before sleeping

DVDs

- 2004 - Jacques Stotzem in Taiwan

Miscellaneous contributions

- 2006 - Sophie Galet - Cyclus
- 2005 - Miam Monster Miam - Soleil Noir
- 2003 - Miam Monster Miam - Forgotten Ladies
- 1997 - Marcel Dadi - Hommage
- 1994 - CD Paysages Acoustiques - "10e édition des Stages Internationaux de Musique".
