= Pride: The Royal Philharmonic Orchestra Plays U2 =

Studio album by Royal Philharmonic Orchestra
- Released: April 20, 1999
- Recorded: CTS Studios, London, May 1998
- Genre: Orchestral, easy listening, instrumental rock
- Label: Music Club Records
- Producer: Mike Townend, Gill Townend

Royal Philharmonic Orchestra chronology
Sensuality (1999)	Pride: The Royal Philharmonic Orchestra Plays U2 (1999)	Plays Lennon and McCartney (1999)

Alternative Cover
- 2003 re-release cover

Professional ratings
Review scores
Source	Rating
Allmusic	3/5 stars

Pride: The Royal Philharmonic Orchestra Plays U2 is a U2 tribute album recorded by the Royal Philharmonic Orchestra in May 1998. It was released on April 20, 1999. Although it was released in 1999, it contains no material more recent than on U2's 1991 album Achtung Baby. The album was re-released on June 23, 2003 under the title The Hits of U2.

The original cover art of the album is a parody on the cover of U2's 1988 album Rattle and Hum.

== Track listing ==
Unlike previous tribute albums by the Royal Philharmonic Orchestra, such as the 1996 tribute to Pink Floyd, Pride is entirely instrumental and contains no lyrics. It covers material from five U2 albums; War, The Unforgettable Fire, The Joshua Tree, Rattle and Hum, and Achtung Baby.

1. "Pride (In the Name of Love)" – 5:42
2. "Even Better Than the Real Thing" – 4:58
3. "Desire" – 4:02
4. "Sunday Bloody Sunday" – 6:19
5. "I Still Haven't Found What I'm Looking For" – 5:37
6. "One" – 5:03
7. "Angel of Harlem" – 4:16
8. "When Love Comes to Town" – 4:29
9. "New Year's Day" – 4:55
10. "Two Hearts Beat as One" – 4:53
11. "Who's Gonna Ride Your Wild Horses" – 6:44
12. "All I Want Is You" – 5:00
