= Rockabye Baby! =

Rockabye Baby Music
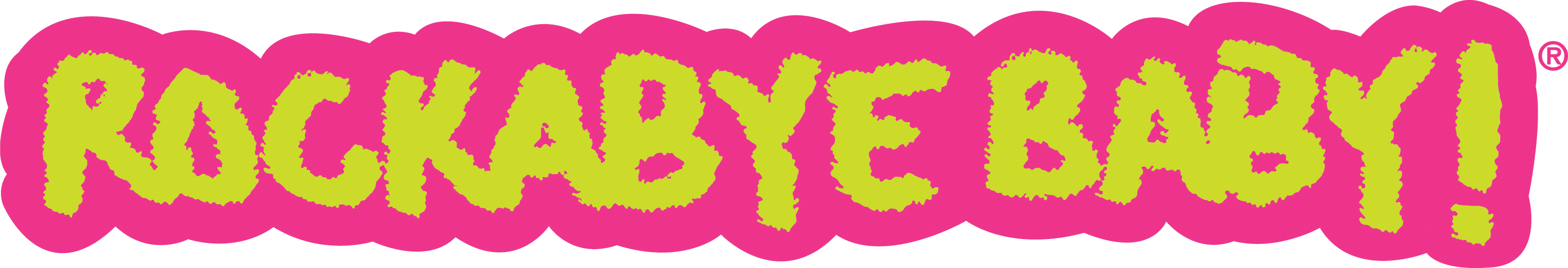

Background information
- Origin: Los Angeles, California, United States
- Genres: Children's music; lullaby renditions
- Years active: 2006–present
- Label: Rockabye Baby Music
- Website: www.rockabyebabymusic.com

Rockabye Baby! is a series of CDs geared toward infants and newborns, containing instrumental lullaby versions of popular rock bands including the Beatles, the Rolling Stones, and Led Zeppelin. This CMH Records series debuted in 2006, and garnered many reviews from the music and entertainment industry, including MTV, The Boston Globe, Chicago Sun-Times, Entertainment Weekly, InStyle magazine, ABC World News, and The Washington Post. Rockabye Baby! CDs were included in gift bags given to all of the survivors of the 2010 Cholera outbreak in Port-au-Prince, Haiti. The series is produced by Lisa Roth, sister of Van Halen frontman David Lee Roth.

In 2011, Rockabye Baby! released their five-year anniversary compilation, Good Day, Goodnight, a 2-CD set featuring songs from previously released albums as well as several new songs.

As of 2023 there are over 100 Rockabye Baby! albums on the market from a diverse array of artists, such as Journey, Björk and The Weeknd. The Spokesman Review said "the series is designed for modern-music-minded parents who want to share songs like Paranoid Android with their kids without scarring them for life."

Several songs from the 2006 Rockabye Baby! release, Lullaby Renditions of Nirvana appear in the 2015 Kurt Cobain biographical film, Montage of Heck, directed by Brett Morgen. On February 4, 2018, the Rockabye Baby! version of Nirvana's "All Apologies" appeared in a Super Bowl commercial for T-mobile.

Ten years after the release of Lemonade, Rockabye Baby! released a lullaby version of the album with soft musical instruments replacing Beyoncé's vocals.

== Reviews ==
- Rockabye Baby has been reviewed in the national media and child-rearing magazines Parents, Parenting, American Baby and Child.
- Rockabye Baby! Baby's Favorite Rock Songs, which was available exclusively at Starbucks March 23-April 19, 2010, reached #3 on Billboard’s Kids' Albums chart, #18 on the Billboard Independent Albums, and #111 on the Billboard Top 200.
- Rockabye Baby! and Hushabye Baby CDs were featured on Good Day LA's "Style File: Jill's Favorite Baby Gifts" on December 9, 2009.

== Discography ==
Date	Title
08/29/2006	Rockabye Baby! Lullaby Renditions of Coldplay
08/29/2006	Rockabye Baby! Lullaby Renditions of Metallica
08/29/2006	Rockabye Baby! Lullaby Renditions of Radiohead
09/19/2006	Rockabye Baby! Lullaby Renditions of Pink Floyd
09/19/2006	Rockabye Baby! Lullaby Renditions of Tool
10/10/2006	Rockabye Baby! Lullaby Renditions of The Beach Boys
10/10/2006	Rockabye Baby! Lullaby Renditions of The Cure
10/31/2006	Rockabye Baby! Lullaby Renditions of Led Zeppelin
10/31/2006	Rockabye Baby! Lullaby Renditions of Nirvana
01/02/2007	Rockabye Baby! Lullaby Renditions of Queens of the Stone Age
01/09/2007	Rockabye Baby! Lullaby Renditions of The Eagles
01/30/2007	Rockabye Baby! Lullaby Renditions of The Ramones
01/30/2007	Rockabye Baby! Lullaby Renditions of U2
02/20/2007	Rockabye Baby! Lullaby Renditions of Nine Inch Nails
02/20/2007	Rockabye Baby! Lullaby Renditions of No Doubt
02/20/2007	Rockabye Baby! Lullaby Renditions of Smashing Pumpkins
03/13/2007	Rockabye Baby! Lullaby Renditions of The Beatles
03/13/2007	Rockabye Baby! Lullaby Renditions of Björk
03/13/2007	Rockabye Baby! Lullaby Renditions of Bob Marley
06/05/2007	Rockabye Baby! Lullaby Renditions of Green Day
09/11/2007	Rockabye Baby! Lullaby Renditions of The Rolling Stones
09/11/2007	Rockabye Baby! Lullaby Renditions of Christmas Rock Classics
03/04/2008	Rockabye Baby! Lullaby Renditions of AC/DC
06/10/2008	Rockabye Baby! Lullaby Renditions of the Pixies
01/27/2009	Rockabye Baby! More Lullaby Renditions of The Beatles
05/19/2009	Rockabye Baby! Lullaby Renditions of Queen
09/15/2009	Rockabye Baby! Lullaby Renditions of Aerosmith
11/11/2009	Rockabye Baby! Lullaby Renditions of Guns N' Roses
02/09/2010	Rockabye Baby! Lullaby Renditions of Journey
03/23/2010	Rockabye Baby! Baby's Favorite Rock Songs
05/18/2010	Rockabye Baby! Lullaby Renditions of Kanye West
07/23/2010	Rockabye Baby! Lullaby Renditions of Black Sabbath
08/10/2010	Rockabye Baby! Lullaby Renditions of Elvis Presley
10/26/2010	Rockabye Baby! Lullaby Renditions of Pearl Jam
11/23/2010	Rockabye Baby! Lullaby Renditions of Bon Jovi
02/15/2011	Rockabye Baby! Lullaby Renditions of Weezer
04/26/2011	Rockabye Baby! Lullaby Renditions of The Flaming Lips
06/14/2011	Rockabye Baby! Lullaby Renditions of Def Leppard
08/16/2011	Rockabye Baby! Lullaby Renditions of Madonna
09/06/2011	Rockabye Baby! Good Day, Goodnight (2 CD Compilation, celebrating Rockabye Baby!'s 5th anniversary)
10/18/2011	Rockabye Baby! Lullaby Renditions of The Police
11/15/2011	Rockabye Baby! Lullaby Renditions of Van Halen
11/18/2012	Rockabye Baby! Lullaby Renditions of The Tragically Hip
02/07/2012	Rockabye Baby! Lullaby Renditions of Depeche Mode
03/06/2012	Rockabye Baby! Lullaby Renditions of Dave Matthews Band
04/24/2012	Rockabye Baby! Lullaby Renditions of The Smiths
05/29/2012	Rockabye Baby! Lullaby Renditions of Foo Fighters
07/31/2012	Rockabye Baby! Lullaby Renditions of Red Hot Chili Peppers
08/28/2012	Rockabye Baby! Lullaby Renditions of Kiss
09/25/2012	Rockabye Baby! Lullaby Renditions of Prince
10/16/2012	Rockabye Baby! More Lullaby Renditions of U2
01/29/2013	Rockabye Baby! Lullaby Renditions of Rush
02/26/2013	Rockabye Baby! Lullaby Renditions of Muse
03/26/2013	Rockabye Baby! Lullaby Renditions of Blur
04/30/2013	Rockabye Baby! Lullaby Renditions of The White Stripes
06/18/2013	Rockabye Baby! Lullaby Renditions of Silverchair
07/09/2013	Rockabye Baby! Lullaby Renditions of Jay Z
08/13/2013	Rockabye Baby! Lullaby Renditions of Michael Jackson
09/10/2013	Rockabye Baby! Lullaby Renditions of Elton John
10/29/2013	Rockabye Baby! Lullaby Renditions of Nickelback
01/21/2014	Rockabye Baby! Lullaby Renditions of Robin Thicke's Blurred Lines (Digital Single)
02/04/2014	Rockabye Baby! Lullaby Renditions of P!nk
03/25/2014	Rockabye Baby! Lullaby Renditions of The Clash
04/29/2014	Rockabye Baby! Lullaby Renditions of David Bowie
06/24/2014	Rockabye Baby! Good Baby, Bad Baby (Compilation)
08/19/2014	Rockabye Baby! Lullaby Renditions of Maroon 5
09/23/2014	Rockabye Baby! Lullaby Renditions of Bruce Springsteen
10/28/2014	Rockabye Baby! Lullaby Renditions of Eminem
02/10/2015	Rockabye Baby! Lullaby Renditions of Fleetwood Mac
01/21/2014	Rockabye Baby! Lullaby Renditions of Taylor Swift's Blank Space and Wonderland (Digital Single)
04/28/2015	Rockabye Baby! Lullaby Renditions of Grateful Dead
08/14/2015	Rockabye Baby! Lullaby Renditions of Blink-182
10/02/2015	Rockabye Baby! Lullaby Renditions of Sublime
10/30/2015	Rockabye Baby! Lullaby Renditions of Taylor Swift
12/04/2015	Rockabye Baby! Lullaby Renditions of Fall Out Boy
03/25/2016	Rockabye Baby! Lullaby Renditions of Rihanna
04/16/2016	Rockabye Baby! Lullaby Renditions of Creedence Clearwater Revival
04/29/2016	Rockabye Baby! Lullaby Renditions of Adele
10/04/2016	Rockabye Baby! Lullaby Renditions of Iron Maiden
10/14/2016	Rockabye Baby! Birthday Party (Compilation celebrating the 10th anniversary of Rockabye Baby!)
02/24/2017	Rockabye Baby! Lullaby Renditions of Beyoncé
03/31/2017	Rockabye Baby! Lullaby Renditions of Songs from Hamilton (first digital-only album, later released on CD with More Lullaby Renditions of Songs from Hamilton)
04/28/2017	Rockabye Baby! Lullaby Renditions of The Doors
08/18/2017	Rockabye Baby! Lullaby Renditions of Justin Timberlake
09/27/2017	Rockabye Baby! My Girl (digital single)
10/26/2017	Rockabye Baby! More Lullaby Renditions of Songs from Hamilton
11/03/2017	Rockabye Baby! Lullaby Renditions of Bruno Mars
02/23/2018	Rockabye Baby! Lullaby Renditions of Johnny Cash
04/27/2018	Rockabye Baby! Lullaby Renditions of Beastie Boys
07/27/2018	Rockabye Baby! Who Runs the World (compilation of songs originally performed by female artists)
09/21/2018	Rockabye Baby! Lullaby Renditions of Lady Gaga
10/19/2018	Rockabye Baby! Merry Christmas (3 Song Digital EP)
11/23/2018	Rockabye Baby! Lullaby Renditions of Tom Petty
02/22/2019	Rockabye Baby! Lullaby Renditions of Drake
05/03/2019	Rockabye Baby! Lullaby Renditions of Juanes
06/28/2019	Rockabye Baby! Lullaby Renditions of Miranda Lambert
08/09/2019	Rockabye Baby! Lullaby Renditions of Imagine Dragons
09/20/2019	Rockabye Baby! Lullaby Renditions of Selena
10/25/2019	Rockabye Baby! Lullaby Renditions of Katy Perry
12/06/2019	Rockabye Baby! Lullaby Renditions of Snoop Dogg
02/21/2020	Rockabye Baby! Lullaby Renditions of Ed Sheeran
04/24/2020	Rockabye Baby! Lullaby Renditions of Wu-Tang Clan
06/19/2020	Rockabye Baby! Lullaby Renditions of Shakira
08/14/2020	Rockabye Baby! Lullaby Renditions of Shania Twain
05/21/2021	Rockabye Baby! Lullaby Renditions of Marvin Gaye's 'What's Going On' (First front-to-back album tribute)
07/30/2021	Rockabye Baby! Lullaby Renditions of Dolly Parton
09/10/2021	Rockabye Baby! Lullaby Renditions of The Weeknd
10/29/2021	Rockabye Baby! Lullaby Renditions of Panic! at the Disco
02/04/2022	Rockabye Baby! Lullaby Renditions of Blake Shelton
05/06/2022	Rockabye Baby! Lullaby Renditions of J Balvin
09/02/2022	Rockabye Baby! Lullaby Renditions of Sia
10/07/2022	Rockabye Baby! Lullaby Renditions of Outkast
05/12/2023	Rockabye Baby! Lullaby Renditions of 'The Miseducation of Lauryn Hill'
06/30/2024	Rockabye Baby! Lullaby Renditions of Janet Jackson
09/13/2024	Rockabye Baby! Lullaby Renditions of Taylor Swift, Vol. 2
02/21/2025	Rockabye Baby! Lullaby Renditions of Bad Bunny
04/04/2025	Rockabye Baby! Lullaby Renditions of BTS
07/11/2025	Rockabye Baby! Lullaby Renditions of Daft Punk
11/21/2025	Rockabye Baby! Lullaby Renditions of Ariana Grande
02/13/2026	Rockabye Baby! Lullaby Renditions of Backstreet Boys
03/27/2026	Rockabye Baby! Lullaby Renditions of Beyoncé's 'Lemonade'
06/05/2026	Rockabye Baby! Lullaby Renditions of Post Malone
08/14/2026	Rockabye Baby! Lullaby Renditions of Paramore
