= Saint Matthew Parish =

- U.S. National Register of Historic Places
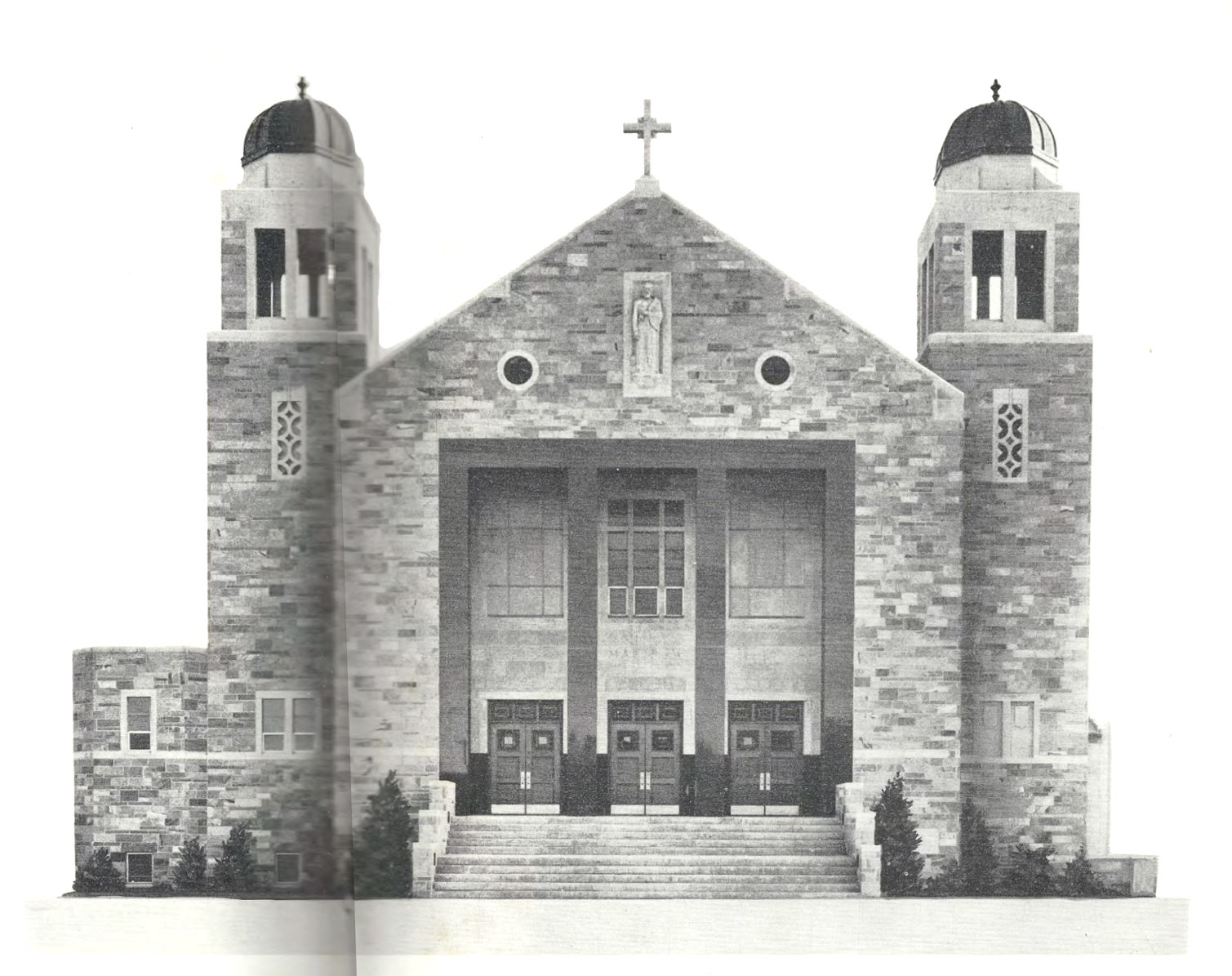
- Interactive map
- Location: 6021 Whittier Ave. Detroit, Michigan
- Coordinates: 42°24′43″N 82°56′33″W
- Built: 1930, 1955
- Built by: Matthew Lalewicz
- Architect: Donaldson & Meier, O’Dell & Diehl
- Architectural style: Modern, Tudor Revival
- NRHP reference No.: 100008814
- Added to NRHP: April 4, 2023

Saint Matthew Parish is Catholic church located at 6021 Whittier Avenue in Detroit. It was listed on the National Register of Historic Places in 2023.

== History ==
Saint Matthew Parish was established in 1926, with the first mass held the following year in a new building located about six blocks from the present parish complex. Anticipating growth, the parish purchased property at the corner of Harper and Whittier, the present site of the church. Also purchased was a house to serve as a rectory. In 1930, a school and convent, designed by the architectural firm of O’Dell & Diehl, were constructed at the site. The school started with 351 students, and by 1940 had 800.

In 1953, the parish contracted the architectural firm of Donaldson & Meier to design a new church and rectory. The church was completed and the first mass was held in September 1955. Along with the new church, the school was expanded multiple times, with additions constructed in 1948, 1959, and 1961. The school's peak enrollment occurred in 1966, with 1,214 students. A parish activities building was constructed in 1966.

However, church membership and school enrollment began declining. In 1980, the last teaching nun left the school, and the associated convent was demolished in 1981. By 2000, the school had only 146 students, and the school was closed in 2008. As of 2023, the parish is still active and has regular masses.

== Description ==
Saint Matthew Parish contains four buildings: the church, a rectory, a school, and an activities building. The church is a three-and-a-half-story building with a gable front, designed in a Modern interpretation of the Romanesque style. It is clad with coursed rock-faced sandstone and has red tile clad roofs and limestone trim. The front is dominated by a two-and-a-half-story tall portico framed in red granite, reached by wide granite steps. Two massive red granite pillars divide the portico into three sections. The sides and back of the portico are clad in smooth limestone, and the three entrances contain pairs of wood panel doors with stained glass lights and transom.

The rectory is a two-story, L-shaped, Modern building connected to the rear of the church, and clad in the same sandstone. The school is a two-story Tudor Revival style building with an F-shaped footprint. It is clad in multi-tone orange-brown brick and has a limestone trim. The school was constructed in several sections, but all sections mesh visually. The activities building is a two-story regtangular structure with a flat roof. It is clad in multi-tone yellow brick.
