= Surrender (Godsmack song) =

2022 single by Godsmack

Single by Godsmack

from the album Lighting Up the Sky
- Released: September 28, 2022
- Genre: Hard rock
- Length: 3:40
- Label: BMG
- Songwriters: Sully Erna; Erik Ron
- Producers: Sully Erna; Andrew Murdock

Godsmack singles chronology
| "Unforgettable" (2018) | "Surrender" (2022) | "You and I" (2022) |

Music video
- "Surrender" on YouTube

"Surrender" is a song by American rock band Godsmack. It marks the first single from their ninth and final studio album Lighting Up the Sky and their first new music in four years since the release of their seventh studio album When Legends Rise in 2018.

== Lyrical theme ==
In an exclusive comment to Audacy, frontman Sully Erna described the song as "very cut and dry", and revealed that it's about waving the white flag in a relationship:

It's simply about the exhaustion we can all feel in relationships at times from the redundancy of fighting with each other. At a certain point in our lives, we submit to putting aside who's right or wrong, we just want it to STOP! So we wave the white flag.

Liz Scarlett of Louder Sound magazine described the lyrics as both "brooding" and "contemplative".

== Release ==
On September 22, 2022, the band released a 12-second teaser for "Surrender". The single made its official world premiere on September 28.

== Music video ==
The music video for "Surrender" was released on November 18, 2022. The clip alternates between live footage of the band performing the song, behind the scene footage, and heartfelt interactions they had with fans throughout the years.

== Reception ==
=== Critical ===
Initial reviews of the single have been positive. Greg Kennelty of Metal Injection described the song as having "this very specific early 2000s radio vibe to it" but noted that "I don't mean it in a bad way either. Joe DiVita of Loudwire praised the song as both "catchy" and "punchy" and commended the band for their hit-writing ability 25 years into their career.

=== Commercial ===
Upon its release, "Surrender" entered multiple charts, including the Billboard Mainstream Rock chart. Like the band's previous four singles from the When Legends Rise, "Surrender" peaked at number one, giving Godsmack their first number-one single off Lighting Up the Sky, and their twelfth number-one single overall.

== Personnel ==
Godsmack

- Sully Erna – vocals, rhythm guitar, producer
- Tony Rombola – lead guitar
- Robbie Merrill – bass
- Shannon Larkin – drums

== Charts ==
=== Weekly charts ===
Weekly chart performance for "Surrender"
| Chart (2022) | Peak position |
|---|---|
| Germany Airplay (TopHit) | 45 |
| US Rock & Alternative Airplay (Billboard) | 3 |

=== Year-end charts ===
Year-end chart performance for "Surrender"
| Chart (2023) | Position |
|---|---|
| US Rock Airplay (Billboard) | 22 |
