= Whiskey Hangover =

Single by Godsmack

from the album The Oracle (deluxe edition)
- Released: June 9, 2009
- Recorded: 2009
- Genre: Alternative metal
- Length: 3:47
- Label: Universal Republic
- Songwriter: Sully Erna
- Producers: Sully Erna; John Kurzweg

Godsmack singles chronology
"Good Times Bad Times" (2007)	"Whiskey Hangover" (2009)	"Cryin' Like a Bitch" (2010)

"Whiskey Hangover" is a song by American rock band Godsmack. Released as a promotional single in 2009, it marked the band's first in the almost two years since the release of "Good Times, Bad Times." The song became a live staple in Godsmack's shows during Crüe Fest 2 and was released in promotion of their appearance on the tour. "Whiskey Hangover" reached number one on the Billboard Mainstream Rock chart.

== Writing ==
The writing process, according to Shannon Larkin, was collaborative, stating that all four members of the band wrote the song and Sully came up with the lyrics:

"All four of us were in the room and we wrote that song in like 3 hours. But it took Sully weeks to come up with the lyrics, and he wasn’t even happy with it ‘cause we had to rush it, ‘cause we needed something for this Motley Crue tour. The 3 of us loved it, but Sully was kind of irritated with it ‘cause he knows it could have been better".

== Sound ==
Shannon Larkin described the single as a prime example of Godsmack original sound, stating that "Whiskey Hangover is good clue of what the band is going for, it's more simplistic than the last record - less bluesy, more heavy", and a "return to the original sound of the Godsmack and what made the band happen in the first place".

== Release ==
"Whiskey Hangover" was released on June 9. It was released to promote the band appearance on Crüe Fest 2.

== Track listing ==
No.	Title	Length
1.	"Whiskey Hangover"

=== Digital download ===
The single became available through iTunes and Amazon on June 30.

== Reception ==
=== Critical ===
411Mania.com reviewer Mark Ingoldsby gave the song three stars out of five, stating that the single "is a return to the band's well-established sound, this time not veering far from their proven hard rock hit-making formula that was somewhat missing from their last and least-successful album. Powerful, driving guitars rock full blast during the track's intro and chorus, and then take the usual back seat as singer Sully Erna invokes his trademark Vedder-meets-Staley vocal stylings in the verses". Yet he criticized the single for being unoriginal and "There's nothing new and exciting revealed musically in it." And "it's a bit too familiar and predictable to be anything more than just adequate rock station filler".

=== Commercial ===
Due to its heavy rotation on radio stations across the country, "Whiskey Hangover" became Godsmack's fifth number one hit on the Billboard Hot Mainstream Rock Tracks chart, in September 2009. It is also their second non-album single to reach number one on that chart since the release of "I Stand Alone" in 2002.

"Whiskey Hangover" also reigns as a record-breaking 17th top-ten single for Godsmack, extending their ownership of the most top-ten hits in active rock history. The band also has had 12 songs reach the top five. It is also the band's first single to top twenty hit on the Billboard Heatseekers Songs chart, peaking at number 16. The song also peaked at number seven on the Billboard Rock Songs chart.

== Personnel ==
- Sully Erna – vocals, rhythm guitar, producer
- Tony Rombola – lead guitar
- Robbie Merrill – bass
- Shannon Larkin – drums
- John Kurzweg – producer, engineer, mixer

== Charts ==
=== Weekly charts ===
Weekly chart performance for "Whiskey Hangover"
Chart (2009)	Peak position
US Bubbling Under Hot 100 (Billboard)	2
US Hot Rock & Alternative Songs (Billboard)	7

=== Year-end charts ===
Year-end chart performance for "Whiskey Hangover"
Chart (2009)	Position
US Hot Rock Songs (Billboard)	30
