= Saints and Sinners (song) =

Single by Godsmack

from the album The Oracle
- Released: March 3, 2011
- Recorded: 2009
- Studio: Serenity West Studios (Hollywood, California)
- Genre: Alternative metal; hard rock
- Length: 4:09
- Label: Universal Republic
- Songwriter: Sully Erna
- Producers: Sully Erna; Dave Fortman

Godsmack singles chronology
"Love-Hate-Sex-Pain" (2010)	"Saints and Sinners" (2011)	"Rocky Mountain Way" (2012)

Audio sample
- file; help

"Saints and Sinners" is a song by American rock band Godsmack. It is the third single from the band's fifth studio album, The Oracle.

== Release ==
On April 27, 2010, "Saints and Sinners" was released as the fourth song from The Oracle, giving the fans the opportunity to download it through iTunes. The song was later released as a single to active rock radio stations in March 2011.

== Track listing ==
Digital single

No.	Title	Length
1.	"Saints and Sinners"	4:09

== Commercial performance ==
Upon its release as a single on late March, "Saints and Sinners" entered both Billboard Hot Mainstream Rock Tracks and the Billboard Rock Songs, peaking at number twenty-five and thirty-five, respectively.

=== Chart positions ===
Chart (2010)	Peak position
Billboard Hot Mainstream Rock Tracks	25
Billboard Rock Songs	35

== Personnel ==
- Sully Erna – vocals, rhythm guitar, producer
- Tony Rombola – lead guitar
- Robbie Merrill – bass
- Shannon Larkin – drums
- Dave Fortman – producer
