= Souls at Zero (Souls at Zero album) =

Studio album by Souls at Zero
- Released: July 20, 1993
- Recorded: March 1, 1993 – April 7, 1993
- Genre: Groove metal, thrash metal
- Length: 63:16
- Label: Energy
- Producer: Drew Mazurek

Souls at Zero chronology
Souls at Zero (1993)	Six-T-Six (1994)

Souls at Zero is the debut studio album by American heavy metal band Souls at Zero (formerly Wrathchild America), released on July 20, 1993 by Energy Rekords. While retaining the thrash metal roots of Wrathchild America, the sound of this album is also of groove metal and alternative metal akin to Pantera and Helmet.

== Track listing ==
All tracks are written by Souls at Zero

No.	Title	Length
1.	"Frustration"	4:37
2.	"Never"	5:22
3.	"Look"	4:16
4.	"Hardline"	4:40
5.	"Lost"	6:19
6.	"Checkin' Out"	4:20
7.	"Souls at Zero"	5:37
8.	"Grey World"	4:28
9.	"Not You"	6:10
10.	"Crowded Head"	4:35
11.	"Welcome to the 90s"	4:18
12.	"Mind's Eye"	8:34

== Personnel ==
- Brad Divens – lead vocals, bass
- Jay Abbene – guitars
- Terry Carter – guitars
- Shannon Larkin – drums

Production

- Drew Mazurek – engineer
