= Bulletproof (Godsmack song) =

2018 song by Godsmack

Single by Godsmack

from the album When Legends Rise
- Released: February 28, 2018
- Recorded: 2017–2018
- Genre: Hard rock
- Length: 2:57
- Label: BMG
- Songwriters: Sully Erna; Erik Ron
- Producers: Sully Erna; Erik Ron

Godsmack singles chronology
| "Come Together" (2017) | "Bulletproof" (2018) | "When Legends Rise" (2018) |

Music video
- "Bulletproof" on YouTube

"Bulletproof" is a song by American rock band Godsmack. It was the first single off of their seventh studio album When Legends Rise.

== Background ==
The song was first released on February 28, 2018. as the first single from their seventh studio album When Legends Rise. The song is the band's first release since switching record labels from Universal Republic to BMG in 2016 for more artistic control over their music. Their prior single, a cover of the Beatles' "Come Together" was released as a single in 2017, but this was because it originated from the band's 2012 release Live & Inspired.

== Themes and composition ==
Lyrically, the song, along with its respective album, are related to the band still being together and functioning well as a unit for over twenty years. Frontman Sully Erna said of writing the song:

I always write about things that have affected me on an emotional level...But if I choose to do that, I have to be prepared to be honest and vulnerable. And so the challenge is figuring out how 'exposed' you want to be with personal information. But I've also learnt over the years that, for me, being transparent, even to the point of embarrassment sometimes, is so much better than holding it inside and extending that pain longer than you need to. 'Bulletproof' is just another moment in my life when I allowed myself to be vulnerable and got hurt. It's this kind of carelessness from other people that eventually hardens you and forces you to put up that wall to protect yourself. So when and if they circle back around and try to get back in, you make yourself bulletproof.

Musically, the song was described as more melodic and catchy, and less aggressive, than the band's past music. Loudwire described it as having a "subdued vibe" in the choruses, with layers of guitar added gradually, until it "explodes" into the chorus, with heavy distorted guitars and melodic, soaring vocals.

== Track listing ==
Digital single

| No. | Title | Writer(s) | Length |
|---|---|---|---|
| 1. | "Bulletproof" | Lyrics: Sully Erna, Erik Ron; Music: Sully Erna, Shannon Larkin, Robbie Merrill, Tony Rombola | 2:57 |

== Music video ==
The music video for "Bulletproof" was released in April 3, 2018. It features guest appearances by Billy Ray Cyrus and Sebastian Bach. The 10 minute video was created by director Troy Smith and producer/editor Noah Berlow. The clip follows the band as they "audition" different directors to make their new music video, only to settle on Sully Erna's "cousin from Italy," Salvatore Pasquale. When asked about the making of the "Bulletproof" music video and the band's decision to take a comedic approach, Erna stated that "We just really enjoy having fun and laughing," adding, "Music is about entertainment just as much as it's about the art."

== Reception ==
=== Critical ===
Reaction to the song has been mixed. Metal Injection sees the song as a "departure" for the band, instead opting for a "more melodic/catchy sound". MetalSucks however was critical of the new sound demonstrated by the song, comparing it to 3 Doors Down and pop music.

=== Commercial ===
Upon its release, "Bulletproof" entered multiple charts, including the Billboard Mainstream Rock Songs. The single debuted at number 24, making it the highest debut and greatest gainer in charting for the week. The single ultimately peaked at number one where it remained for five consecutive weeks, giving Godsmack their eighth number one single on that chart. When asked about the single's chart performance, Sully Erna admitted that, despite "Bulletproof" being "the most commercial song on the record", he was still pleased to see the fans embrace it. The single was certified platinum by the RIAA on September 24, 2020 for accumulating 1 million certified units, almost a year after it was certified gold for accumulating 500,000 certified units. In addition to it being certified platinum, "Bulletproof" was the most-played song on rock radio in 2018.

== Personnel ==
Band

- Sully Erna – vocals, rhythm guitar
- Tony Rombola – lead guitar
- Robbie Merrill – bass
- Shannon Larkin – drums

== Charts ==
=== Weekly charts ===
Weekly chart performance for "Bulletproof"
| Chart (2018) | Peak position |
|---|---|
| Canada Rock (Billboard) | 10 |
| US Digital Song Sales (Billboard) | 24 |
| US Hot Rock & Alternative Songs (Billboard) | 9 |
| US Rock & Alternative Airplay (Billboard) | 11 |

=== Year-end charts ===
Year-end chart performance for "Bulletproof"
| Chart (2018) | Position |
|---|---|
| US Hot Rock Songs (Billboard) | 17 |
| US Rock Airplay (Billboard) | 23 |

== Certifications ==
Certifications for "Bulletproof"
| Region | Certification | Certified units/sales |
|---|---|---|
| United States (RIAA) | Platinum | 1,000,000^{‡} |
^{‡} Sales+streaming figures based on certification alone.
