= 1000hp (album) =

Studio album by Godsmack
- Released: August 5, 2014
- Recorded: 2013–2014
- Studio: GSHQ (Derry, New Hampshire)
- Genres: Hard rock; alternative metal
- Length: 45:28 (standard edition); 49:33 (Best Buy edition)
- Labels: Republic; Spinefarm
- Producers: Sully Erna; Dave Fortman

Godsmack chronology
Live & Inspired (2012)	1000hp (2014)	When Legends Rise (2018)

Singles from 1000hp
- 1. "1000hp" Released: June 9, 2014; 2. "Something Different" Released: September 18, 2014; 3. "What's Next" Released: May 19, 2015

1000 hp, stylized as 1000HP, is the seventh studio album by American rock band Godsmack. It is a follow-up to the band's 2010 gold-selling album The Oracle and was released on August 5, 2014.

== Making of the record ==
On November 6, 2013, it was reported that Godsmack had begun writing for the new yet to be titled album. On February 5, 2014 frontman Sully Erna tweeted that the band has made massive headway in the songwriting process for album. On April 20, Erna revealed on his personal Facebook page that the band has completed working on album, stating:

"We are officially DONE recording! And this record is BAD ASS! Haven’t been this excited in awhile! Hope u all love it! 1st single out soon!"

Two days later, the band made an official announcement on its official website that they have finished the album recording and that they have recorded 15 songs, 10 of which have made it on the album. The full track list was revealed on July 10.

=== Writing ===
" We just wrote what we felt and what came from our hearts and, so, at the end of the day we had like, I don't know, 20 some songs or whatever that we felt were good enough to present."

— Shannon Larkin on writing "1000hp" - Webisode 2

In an interview with Billboard, Erna revealed that the writing process for 1000hp was collaborative, stating: "When it was time to start writing again, the guys brought in a batch of songs and I had a batch of songs I'd been working on and we laid them all on the table and started carving through them and seeing which ones we were gonna tighten up and which ones were not gonna make the cut." The result, according to Erna, is a characteristically hard-hitting affair that ranges from the blazing, autobiographical title track and first single to more experimental and stretched-out fare such as "Generation Day" and "Nothing Comes Easy."

Prior to the interview, and during a live Facebook Q&A chat, the band was asked whether every member contributed to the album. Erna was the one to answer that question, insisting that, "[E]very one contributed to this album and brought something [t]o the table."

=== Recording ===
1000hp was recorded in Godsmack's newly built 4,000-square-foot headquarters in Boston. "We just built it this year," explained bassist Robbie Merrill. "We have been looking to have one big place for a long time. All our equipment has been stored in four or five different places and we wanted to get everything in one room. So we leased out a warehouse for at least five years. We went in there and put up some walls and made a studio and a lounger. We basically have all our stuff in storage at one end and at the other end we have the rehearsal space and we have our studio all set to record, as well as the lounge and a kitchen."

"It was also great to do this album in our hometown," concluded Merrill. "We are all born and raised in the Boston area and it was good for all of us to just soak up the atmosphere of the town and let it influence our music."

"We have everything there and we don't really need to go anywhere else now to either rehearse for tours or to record new music," said Erna who, in the first webisode of "The Making of 1000hp", took viewers on a guided tour of the band's new headquarters, showing how it looked when the band first leased it and how they transformed it into a recording, rehearsal and storage complex.

=== Production ===
"I've always had a great respect for the guy. We had such good luck with him and good success that my mentality is, if it's not broke, don't fix it."

— Sully Erna on working with Dave Fortman - Webisode 4

1000hp was mixed and produced by Dave Fortman, who had worked with Godsmack on their previous studio album, The Oracle, as well as with other bands such as Superjoint Ritual, Mudvayne, Otep, Slipknot and Simple Plan, and on both of Evanescence's multi-platinum selling albums, The Open Door and Fallen. "I love the studio," said Fortman. "I came back to get that unique sound for this new Godsmack record and we really nailed it and had a great time." "It was great," said guitarist Tony Rombola in response to Guitar World's question regarding how it was like working with Fortman. "He has a lot of ideas and was a lot of fun to work with. He's also a guitar player and plays drums, so he was able to give us input and bounce ideas off of us." The album was co-produced by Sully Erna.

=== Album cover ===
On July 1, Godsmack debuted the album cover for 1000hp online. The album cover plays off the theme of the album's title as it features the signature Godsmack sun logo and a burst of flames from which a classic car emerges.

== Sound ==
In an interview with The Pulse of Radio, Sully Erna described the sound of the album as "a little bit more raw, a little bit more open," contributing that to the production of the album, which he described as "really kind of raw and in your face." When asked by Revolver's Richard Bienstock about the sound of the album, and how each song brings something different to the table, Erna responded: "To me, songs like '1000hp' and 'FML'—which has a bit of a Nirvana punky thing in the choruses—are in one category. Then there's 'Generation Day' and 'Nothing Comes Easy,' which are more epic and weird and unique and artsy, that are in another category. Then there's straight-up songs like 'Locked & Loaded' and 'What's Next' that are in the same category." Erna went on to say that it's funny how the songs are paired up like that, but insisted that was "one of the benefits of everyone in the band having their own stuff when we came in to do this record."

"We wanted [the sound of the album] to be straight forward and simple," said Tony Rombola. "I think that was the theme. There are elements of punk in some of the grooves that Sully brought in, and even in the selection of some of the riffs that I had as well. A lot of it is simpler, with some different feels."

== Promotion ==
On June 2, a 27-second audio preview of the song "1000hp" was uploaded on Godsmack's official YouTube channel. On June 9, the single made its way to rock radio stations in the United States and was uploaded in its entirety on the band's YouTube channel. The single became available for download on June 10. Following the release of "1000hp", "Generation Day" was released as a downloadable song on July 21. One day after the release of "1000hp", Godsmack and Republic Records held a private listening party for the album on June 10 at New York City's Quad Studios. For the event, select members of the media were invited and presented with a taste of the album while Sully Erna, after being introduced by label co-founder and chief executive Avery Lipman, engaged them with stories about each song played.

On July 28, the album was made available for stream via iTunes Radio. On August 3, Erna and drummer Shannon Larkin sat down with WAAF (FM)'s Mistress Carrie for an exclusive interview to discuss the new album and the history of the band. During the 60-minute interview, eight tracks were sampled, including the title track, "Generation Day", "Something Different", and "Locked and Loaded." On August 4, Godsmack took the stage at the iHeartRadio Theater in New York City as part of the iHeartRadio Live Series for an intimate live performance. The show, which was streamed online, included live performances of the title track "1000hp", as well as "What's Next?" and "Generation Day."

An acoustic version of the song "Turning to Stone" appears in The Walking Dead compilation Songs of Survival Vol. 2, included in the Blu-ray and DVD release of the show's fourth season.

=== The Making of 1000hp ===
To promote 1000hp, Godsmack teamed up with iHeartRadio to create "The Making of 1000hp", a series of five webisodes which give fans a look at the process of making the album. Each webisode is filled with exclusive content, behind-the-scenes footage, interviews, and sneak peeks at the album's songs. The five webisodes premiered on July 9, 16, 23, 30, and August 6.

=== Tour ===
In support of 1000hp, Godsmack is set to headline the Revolt on the Rio Grande, the Monster Energy Aftershock Festival, the Rockstar Energy Drink Uproar Festival and KISW 99.9 Pain In The Grass. Furthermore, the band has announced a five-date Canadian tour that will see them perform in Lethbridge, Saskatoon, Edmonton, Regina and Winnipeg. "We're all pretty fired up at the moment, and that extends to taking our music overseas," said Sully Erna regarding the possibility of an international tour. "It's time to give some real focus to our touring activities outside of North America, and we think this new single will make our intentions clear. It's one for the fans, and that means our fans everywhere..." Godsmack were announced on August 20, 2014, to be part of the Soundwave Festival in Australia. It has expanded to a 2-day festival for the first time, next year in February/March 2015.

== Release ==
On August 5, 2014, 1000hp was released in the U.S. via Republic Records, a division of Universal Music Group. In Europe, the album was released on September 1 via Spinefarm Records. On July 7, the album was made available for preorder via Amazon and the band's official website. The iTunes pre-order went live on July 21.

Country	Date	Distributing label	Format
United States	August 5, 2014	Republic Records	CD, Vinyl and Music download services
Europe	September 1, 2014	Spinefarm Records	CD, Vinyl and Music download services

== Reception ==
=== Critical response ===
Professional ratings
Review scores
Source	Rating
411mania.com	8.0/10
AllMusic	3/5 stars
About.com	4/5 stars
ARTISTdirect	(favorable)
Loudwire	(favorable)
The Boston Globe	(favorable)
Revolver	4/5 stars

Reviews for the album have been mostly positive. Rick Florino of ARTISTdirect was the first to review the album, describing it as "a high watermark for the Boston group" and "the best hard rock record of the year." Revolver's Richard Bienstock gave the album four out of five stars and praised its title track, which he felt was up there with 'Whatever' and 'Keep Away' in terms of tone and delivery, and commended the band for pushing their boundaries on several songs such as "Nothing Comes Easy" and "Something Different." Bienstock concluded his review by saying, "With 1000hp, Godsmack offer up a few new sounds, while at the same time remaining firmly resolute in their musical mission." Similarly, About.com music journalist Chad Bowar gave the album four out of five stars and praised the band for keeping things fresh while "never straying far from their signature style."

Jeremy Thomas of 411mania.com gave the album an 8.0 out of 10 rating and praised the band for "adopting a few forays outside of their core sound without ever straying so far as to fall off the path." Thomas noted that, while 1000 hp "isn't an all-time great album," the band "delivers some great hooks on the album" and that "There isn't really a weak track amongst [the album's] ten songs." At The Boston Globe, Maura Johnston gave the album a favorable review and described its sound as "leaner and meaner, and a bit nostalgic, too." Another favorable review comes from Chad Childers of Loudwire who felt the album "succeeds in bringing the hard in heavy doses with just the perfect smattering of melody in just the right places." AllMusic reviewer Gregory Heaney gave the album three out of five stars, stating that it's "Godsmack at their most focused, showing that they've finally found the path back to their roots that they'd been searching for."

=== Commercial performance ===
1000hp debuted at number three on the Billboard 200 with first-week sales of 58,000 copies. That made 1000hp the first Godsmack full-length studio album not to debut at number one in more than a decade following the release of 2000's Awake which debuted at number five, and therefore broke the band's streak of three number one albums in a row. The album was initially forecasted to sell between 45,000 and 50,000 copies on its opening week.

The following week, the album dropped to number eight with sales of 21,000 copies for a 63% sales decrease. On its third week, the album dropped to number fifteen with sales of 12,400 copies for a 42% sales decrease. On iTunes, 1000hp topped the Top Rock Albums Chart. In Canada, the album debuted at number two with first-week sales of 6,200 copies. Meanwhile, the album topped the HMV Canada CD sales chart for the week ending August 9.

== Track listing ==
No.	Title	Length
1.	"1000hp"	3:46
2.	"FML"	3:38
3.	"Something Different"	4:42
4.	"What's Next?"	4:21
5.	"Generation Day"	6:12
6.	"Locked & Loaded"	4:13
7.	"Living in the Gray"	4:07
8.	"I Don't Belong"	3:34
9.	"Nothing Comes Easy"	5:39
10.	"Turning to Stone"	5:16
Total length:		45:28

Best Buy edition
No.	Title	Length
11.	"Life Is Good!"	4:05
Total length:		49:33

== Singles ==
=== "1000hp" ===
"1000hp" serves as both the title track and the first single to be released from the album. Upon its release, the single entered both Billboard Hot Mainstream Rock Tracks and the Billboard Rock Songs. Digitally, the single debuted at number one on the U.S. iTunes Rock Chart.

=== "Something Different" ===
"Something Different" is the second single from the album which was released in September 2014. The music video for the song was released in April 2015.

=== "What's Next?" ===
The band selected the song as the third single and there was also a plan to make a video for the track, but it was later canceled for unknown reasons.

== Personnel ==
Godsmack

- Sully Erna – lead vocals, rhythm guitar, production
- Tony Rombola – lead guitar, backing vocals
- Robbie Merrill – bass, backing vocals
- Shannon Larkin – drums, percussion, backing vocals

Additional personnel

- Chris Decato – additional keys and MIDI samples
- Irina Chirkova – cello on "Something Different"
- Tim Theriault – acoustic guitar on "Generation Day"

Production

- Dave Fortman – production, mixing

== Chart positions ==
=== Weekly charts ===
Chart (2014)	Peak position
Australian Albums Chart	65
US Billboard 200	3
US Billboard Rock Albums	2
US Billboard Digital Albums	2
US Billboard Alternative Albums	1
US Billboard Hard Rock Albums	1
Canadian Albums Chart	2

=== Year-end charts ===
Chart (2014)	Position
US Billboard 200	144
US Alternative Albums (Billboard)	17
US Hard Rock Albums (Billboard)	8
US Top Rock Albums (Billboard)	28
