= Unforgettable (Godsmack song) =

2020 song by Godsmack

Single by Godsmack

from the album When Legends Rise
- Released: April 27, 2018 (album); February 4, 2020 (single)
- Recorded: 2017–2018
- Genre: Hard rock
- Length: 3:28
- Label: BMG
- Songwriter: Sully Erna
- Producers: Sully Erna; Eric Ron

Godsmack singles chronology
"Under Your Scars" (2018)	"Unforgettable" (2018)	"Surrender" (2022)

Music video
- "Unforgettable" on YouTube

"Unforgettable" is a song by American rock band Godsmack. It was the fourth single off of their seventh studio album When Legends Rise.

== Writing ==
According to Sully Erna, "Unforgettable" was the last song written for the album and it took the band less than three days to write and to come up with the melody, stating "It was one of those moments where this really big riff came into my head, and I'm thinking, 'is this something we already do, or is this something new just knocking on my brain?' I worked it out, and the melodies and everything just came very quickly."

== Recording ==
During the recording process of "Unforgettable", Godsmack recruited 20 students from Gilbert H. Hood and West Running Brook middle schools in Derry, New Hampshire to provide vocals on the song's chorus. Sully Erna credited Community Alliance for Teen Safety (C.A.T.S.), a non-profit organization working to promote youth safety in Derry and the surrounding communities, for making the students' appearance on the song possible. Erna expressed his satisfaction with how the song turned out, calling it "unique" and "super catchy" while acknowledging it's "different" compared to other songs on the record.

== Track listing ==
Digital single

No.	Title	Writer(s)	Length
1.	"Unforgettable"	Lyrics: Sully Erna; Music: Sully Erna, Shannon Larkin, Robbie Merrill, Tony Rombola	3:28

== Music video ==
'Unforgettable' Documentary Poster

The music video for the single, released on April 8, 2020, was directed by Noah Berlow and produced by Gautam Singhani and took two years to produce. Godsmack invited more than 400 aspiring musicians from middle school students across New England to take part in the video, teaching them the song and aspects of the music business. The video was filmed at the SNHU Arena in Manchester, New Hampshire, with all the students taking part in a performance of the song. On the band's decision to feature the group of music students in the music video, Sully Erna, who can be seen giving an inspirational speech to the group of students toward the beginning of the video, explained:

I wanted this to be a strong message about music and the importance of music, and how it's affecting the generations to come and why it should be validated – not the first thing that should be cut from school systems when they're cutting their budgets.

Erna concluded by saying "This was a fun project for [the kids], but it was also something that was really important to them. They had a voice in this video." Bassist Robbie Merrill shared Erna's sentiments, calling the opportunity "exciting" and emphasizing "It's a memory that they're going to have for the rest of their life."

=== Documentary ===
On June 18, the band produced and released a six-minute mini-documentary on the making of the music video. Referring to the latter as "one of Godsmack's proudest and most humbling #1 moments in their career," the documentary takes viewers behind the scenes as the band and students interacted and recorded the music video together.

== Live performance ==
Godsmack debuted "Unforgettable" live on April 27, 2018, at the Welcome to Rockville 2018 rock festival in Jacksonville, Florida. In an interview with drummer Shannon Larkin, he admitted to the band's use of pre-recorded vocals while performing the song live:

[W]e do 'Unforgettable' now, and that song, we brought in a choir from a middle school in New Hampshire – these 15-year-old kids, and they do this big gang chorus. And we obviously can't bring 15-year-old kids up on stage every show to sing this, so we also run the track on that song, when the kids are singing. So we're not even trying to hide it and lip sync and pretend – it's there, and it's a bunch of kids singing, so people know that that's a tape running.

Prior to that interview, however, the same students who appeared on the song were invited to perform the song live on stage with the band at their show in Gilford, New Hampshire on August 22, 2018, at the Bank of New Hampshire Pavilion.

== Reception ==
=== Critical ===
Reviews for "Unforgettable" were positive. Loudwire's Chad Childers called the song a "head-bobbing rocker." AllMusic's reviewer Neil Yeung described the song as a "massive anthem" Malcolm Dome of Classic Rock praised the song for being based on a "finely honed" melody which plays to Sully Erna's vocal advantage.

=== Commercial ===
Upon its release, "Unforgettable" entered multiple charts, including the Billboard Mainstream Rock. Like the previous three singles from the album, the song peaked at number one where it remained for five consecutive weeks, giving Godsmack their eleventh number one single on that chart. This makes Godsmack one of only four rock acts to score four number one singles from the same album. When asked about that milestone, Sully Erna commented that the band had a good feeling about the song but were still pleasantly surprised to see it reach number one nonetheless. He concluded by saying that he was mostly happy for the students who participated in recording the song, calling them "the voice of this song" and "the true hidden heroes behind it."

== Personnel ==
Godsmack

- Sully Erna – vocals, rhythm guitar, producer
- Tony Rombola – lead guitar
- Robbie Merrill – bass
- Shannon Larkin – drums

Additional personnel

- The Gilbert H. Hood and West Running Brook Choir – additional vocals

== Charts ==
=== Weekly charts ===
Chart (2020)	Peak position
Canada Rock (Billboard)	31
US Mainstream Rock (Billboard)	1
US Hot Rock & Alternative Songs (Billboard)	16
US Rock & Alternative Airplay (Billboard)	5

=== Year-end charts ===
Chart (2020)	Position
US Hot Rock & Alternative Songs (Billboard)	90
