= 1000hp =

Single by Godsmack

from the album 1000hp
- Released: June 9, 2014
- Genre: Alternative metal
- Length: 3:47
- Label: Republic
- Songwriters: Sully Erna; Shannon Larkin; Robbie Merrill; Tony Rombola
- Producers: Sully Erna; Dave Fortman

Godsmack singles chronology
"Rocky Mountain Way" (2012)	"1000hp" (2014)	"Something Different" (2014)

Music video
- "1000hp" on YouTube

"1000hp" ("1000 Horse Power") is the lead single and title track from Godsmack's studio album of the same name. It was released on June 9, 2014, and was made available for digital download on Amazon and iTunes on June 10. The single reached number one on the Billboard Hot Mainstream Rock Tracks, making it the band's seventh number one single on the chart.

== Writing ==
In an interview with the Pulse of Radio, and regarding how the single came together, lead singer Sully Erna revealed that it was written in about an hour, stating, "It's one of those songs that surprisingly came out and was written from back to front in, like, an hour. I started putting one thing together with the next, and then Shannon Larkin started jumping in and then we arranged the whole song, and literally within an hour, maybe 90 minutes, this whole song was written and it was one of the last songs that we wrote, and it ended up becoming the first single."

When interviewed by Full Metal Jackie, Erna offered additional details as how the single came to be, stating, "We had been working on stuff that we had on our own and brought in. I go, 'You know what? We haven’t wrote anything yet, I'm just going to write a song real quick before TC gets back from dinner.' Tony, kidding around, said, 'You should make it a real fast riff because he'll be right back.' So I started playing really fast and then all of a sudden, I was like, 'Hold on. I have something going here.' I started hearing the different movements in the chords and it just started to feel like it was coming together. Then all of a sudden, within 90 minutes the whole song kind of wrote itself."

== Title ==
In the same interview with the Pulse of Radio, Erna revealed that the working title for the single was "100,000 Horsepower", but he felt he needed to change it, explaining, "Actually, the original title I wanted to put on the song was '100,000 Horsepower'. But unfortunately, rhythmically, it was too many syllables and I couldn't make it fit the way I wanted to creatively, so I trimmed it back to '1000 Horsepower', which is still pretty fuckin' powerful, by the way."

== Track listing ==
Digital single

No.	Title	Writer(s)	Length
1.	"1000hp"	Lyrics: Sully Erna; Music: Sully Erna, Shannon Larkin, Robbie Merrill, Tony Rombola;	3:47

== Music video ==
On August 12, the music video for 1000hp premiered on Shazam, a commercial smartphone-based music identification service. One day later, it premiered on Godsmack's official Vevo channel.

== Live performance ==
On August 4, 2014, Godsmack took the stage at the iHeartRadio Theater in New York City as part of the iHeartRadio Live Series for an intimate live performance. The show, which was streamed online, saw the band perform 1000hp live for the first time.

== Reception ==
ARTISTdirect reviewer Rick Florino gave the song a favorable review and described it as a "bombastic Boston bruiser of epic proportions" and that "all of the hallmarks of the band's patented sound remain intact." Florino concluded his review by saying, "It's the kind of tune you could hear at sports events and during high-octane action movie set pieces for years to come. It's exactly how real rock should sound in 2014, and it's one of the best singles of the year." A less favorable review came from Shelly Barclay of AXS, who felt that the song was not on a par with the band's other singles, stating, "The song does not have the same guttural edge as songs like 'Keep Away'." However, she went on to say that the song "holds its own in the band's library of rock tunes."

== Charts ==
=== Weekly charts ===
Weekly chart performance for "1000hp"
Chart (2014)	Peak position
Canada Rock (Billboard)	31
US Hot Rock & Alternative Songs (Billboard)	22
US Rock & Alternative Airplay (Billboard)	16

=== Year-end charts ===
Year-end chart performance for "1000hp"
Chart (2014)	Position
US Hot Rock & Alternative Songs (Billboard)	96
US Rock Airplay (Billboard)	36

== Personnel ==
Godsmack

- Sully Erna – lead vocals, rhythm guitar, producer
- Tony Rombola – lead guitar, backing vocals
- Robbie Merrill – bass guitar
- Shannon Larkin – drums, percussion

Technical personnel

- Dave Fortman – production, mixing
