= Under Your Scars =

2019 single by Godsmack

Single by Godsmack

from the album When Legends Rise
- Released: April 27, 2018 (album); March 28, 2019 (single)
- Recorded: 2017–2018
- Genre: Symphonic rock
- Length: 3:51
- Label: BMG
- Songwriter: Sully Erna
- Producers: Sully Erna; Eric Ron

Godsmack singles chronology
"When Legends Rise" (2018)	"Under Your Scars" (2018)	"Unforgettable" (2018)

Music video
- "Under Your Scars" on YouTube

"Under Your Scars" is a song by American rock band Godsmack. It was the third single off of their seventh studio album When Legends Rise.

== Background and inspiration ==
Sully Erna revealed that the source of the inspiration behind "Under Your Scars" was Lady Gaga, stating:

So humbly I will say, this song came to me shortly after I had spent some quality time with someone who I consider a dear friend, and have grown to admire and respect as one of the smartest and most talented artists today, Stephanie Germanotta, who most of you may know as Lady Gaga. In the short amount of time we hung out, she made me realize that we all have these imperfections, these wounds that we carry (whether they’re physical or emotional) that cut so deep they can cripple us.

== Sound ==
In an interview with Classic Rock, Sully Erna stated that "Under Your Scars" was "probably the most important song on this record" due it being a "legitimate ballad".

"It was the first time we introduced piano to the brand," Erna explained. "It was taking a little bit of what I've done over the years with my solo stuff, and hybriding it to come up with a more classic ballad, like the 'Dream On's and the 'Stairway To Heaven's and the 'November Rain's. I can't say it competes with those songs — obviously it's too new, and those songs are legendary — but I feel like it kind of has those elements of an epic ballad. It starts off very slow and keeps on growing and growing and growing into this big epic finale, and it has some of the deepest lyrics on the record."

== Track listing ==
Digital single

No.	Title	Writer(s)	Length
1.	"Under Your Scars"	Lyrics: Sully Erna; Music: Sully Erna, Shannon Larkin, Robbie Merrill, Tony Rombola	3:51

== Music video ==
The music video for "Under Your Scars" was released on July 19, 2019. The clip, directed by Paris Visone, alternates between live footage of the band performing the ballad and heartfelt interactions they had with fans throughout the years. Radio.com praised the music video for sending a message of positivity and referred to it as "touching".

== Live performance ==
Godsmack debuted "Under Your Scars" on February 27, 2019, at the O2 Forum Kentish Town in London, England. Since then, the song is regularly performed at the band's concerts. On October 8, 2019, Sully Erna and guitarist Tony Rombola performed an acoustic version of the song during a live appearance on SiriusXM's Octane Unleaded.

== Reception ==
=== Critical ===
Reviews for "Under Your Scars" were overwhelmingly positive. Loudwire's Joe Divita described the song as a "tender, powerful track." Similarly, Blabbermouth's reviewer Jay Gorania, who gave the album a six out of ten, described the song as a 'formidable ballad replete with a moving Slash-esque solo that's as evocative as the rest of the song." AllMusic's reviewer Neil Yeung described the song as "sweeping" and "arena-ready."

=== Commercial ===
Upon its release, "Under Your Scars" entered multiple charts, including the Billboard Mainstream Rock. Like the previous two singles from the album, the single peaked at number one where it remained for two consecutive weeks, giving Godsmack their tenth number one single on that chart.

When asked about the single's commercial success, Sully Erna commented that it was a proud moment for the band to announce that milestone, adding that he was feeling blessed and honored to have three singles from the same album to reach the number one spot, a career first for the band.

== The Scars Foundation ==
To accompany "Under Your Scars", the band, who has lost a number of fellow artists and friends to suicide over the past few years, launched The Scars Foundation to help raise awareness for mental health issues. The non-profit organization aims to provide resources and educate those that struggle with suicidal thoughts, bullying, addiction, abuse, and more. Every donation to the organization includes a complimentary download of "Under Your Scars" from which the foundation takes its name.

== Personnel ==
Godsmack

- Sully Erna – Vocals, Rhythm guitar, Piano, producer
- Tony Rombola – Lead guitar
- Robbie Merrill – Bass
- Shannon Larkin – Drums

Additional personnel

- Zvezdelina Haltakova – Violin
- Irina Chirkova – Cello

== Charts ==
=== Weekly charts ===
Chart (2019)	Peak position
Canada Rock (Billboard)	43
US Hot Rock & Alternative Songs (Billboard)	6
US Rock & Alternative Airplay (Billboard)	10

=== Year-end charts ===
Chart (2019)	Position
US Hot Rock & Alternative Songs (Billboard)	28
US Rock Airplay (Billboard)	47

== Certifications ==
Region	Certification	Certified units/sales
United States (RIAA)	Gold	500,000^{‡}
^{‡} Sales+streaming figures based on certification alone.
