= Shine Down (song) =

Single by Godsmack

from the album IV
- Released: June 13, 2006
- Recorded: 2006
- Genre: Hard rock; post-grunge
- Length: 5:01
- Label: Republic/Universal
- Songwriter: Sully Erna
- Producers: Sully Erna; Andy Johns

Godsmack singles chronology
"Speak" (2006)	"Shine Down" (2006)	"The Enemy" (2006)

"Shine Down" is a single by the band Godsmack. It was featured on the band's fourth studio album, IV. The song landed a spot on the Mainstream Rock Tracks at number four.

== Writing ==
According to Shannon Larkin, the song was written by Sully Erna: "I played no role in Shine Down. Sully came in with that song. It is one of the ones on the album where he had it and brought it in. He simply said, 'Give me the "When the Levee Breaks" type drum beat.' Then he played the riff, and we had the song and it was rock. We didn't even know about the harmonica part."

Sully Erna is heard playing the harmonica during the bridge of the song. In an interview with Shannon Larkin, he said that Sully Erna threw in the harmonica solo because he would sit around the studio and jam on his harmonica. Also, it might have been Andy Johns’ idea, he's the one who said, "You should put the harp in the song."

== Song meaning ==
According to Shannon Larkin, the song is about the band's continued belief in a higher power. "The song is about knowing there's something out there, whatever God you believe in. But some kind of power that shines down on you and helps you face the next day or whatever." Shannon Larkin said. Later Sully Erna added that the song is not about the God that religions talk about.

Godsmack performed the song on Late Night with Conan O'Brien on September 5, 2006.

== Personnel ==
- Sully Erna – vocals, rhythm guitar, harmonica, producer
- Tony Rombola – lead guitar
- Robbie Merrill – bass
- Shannon Larkin – drums
- Andy Johns – producer

== Charts ==
=== Weekly charts ===
Weekly chart performance for "Shine Down"
Chart (2006)	Peak position
US Alternative Airplay (Billboard)	31
US Mainstream Rock (Billboard)	4

=== Year-end charts ===
Year-end chart performance for "Shine Down"
Chart (2006)	Position
US Mainstream Rock Songs (Billboard)	18
