= The Other Side (Godsmack EP) =

EP by Godsmack
- Released: March 16, 2004
- Recorded: 2003
- Studios: Avex Honolulu Studios, Honolulu, Hawaii
- Genre: Acoustic rock
- Length: 29:57
- Labels: Universal; Republic
- Producers: Sully Erna; David Bottrill

Godsmack chronology
Faceless (2003)	The Other Side (2004)	IV (2006)

Singles from The Other Side
- 1. "Running Blind" Released: February 29, 2004; 2. "Touché" Released: July 13, 2004

Professional ratings
Review scores
Source	Rating
Allmusic	3/5 stars
Blender	3/5 stars
Entertainment Weekly	Positive
Rolling Stone	2/5 stars

The Other Side is an acoustic EP by American rock band Godsmack, released on March 16, 2004. It includes several previously released songs re-recorded as acoustic versions, as well as three new acoustic tracks.

One new song, "Touché", featured Godsmack's first guitarist, Lee Richards, as well as John Kosco, who were at that time in the now defunct band Dropbox. The other two new acoustic tracks are "Running Blind" and "Voices" which are old songs that vocalist Sully Erna wrote but never recorded.

== Recording ==
According to Sully Erna, the band decided to do an acoustic record because they have always messed around with acoustic versions of their music and gotten great reactions to it. "Reworking the songs this way shows a different side of the band."

The Other Side was recorded in a Hawaiian studio with producer David Bottrill, who has worked with the group on "I Stand Alone", and on their third studio album, Faceless.

== Commercial performance ==
The Other Side debuted at number five on the Billboard 200, selling 98,000 copies in its first week, and the album would go on to sell over half million copies in the United States. The album has been certified Gold by the Recording Industry Association of America (RIAA), with excess sales of 500,000 copies.

== Track listing ==
All tracks are written by Sully Erna, except where noted.

No.	Title	Writer(s)	Length
1.	"Running Blind"		4:00
2.	"Re-Align"		4:23
3.	"Touché" (featuring John Kosco and Lee Richards)	Erna; Kosco; Richards	3:38
4.	"Voices"		3:45
5.	"Keep Away"		4:50
6.	"Spiral"		5:21
7.	"Asleep"		3:58
Total length:			29:57

== Personnel ==
Godsmack

- Sully Erna – vocals, acoustic guitar, producer
- Tony Rombola – acoustic guitar, backing vocals
- Robbie Merrill – bass
- Shannon Larkin – drums, percussion

Additional personnel

- David Bottrill – mixing
- P. R. Brown – art direction, design, cover photo
- Troy Gonzalez – assistant engineer
- Kent Hertz – engineer
- Dave Homcy – studio photography
- John Kosco – vocals (track 3)
- Bob Ludwig – mastering
- Lee Richards – guitar (track 3)
- Ben Sanders – mixing assistant

== Charts ==
=== Weekly charts ===
Weekly chart performance for The Other Side
Chart (2004)	Peak position
US Billboard 200	5

=== Year-end charts ===
Year-end chart performance for The Other Side
Chart (2004)	Position
US Billboard 200	180

== Certifications ==
Certifications and sales for The Other Side
Region	Certification	Certified units/sales
United States (RIAA)	Gold	500,000^{^}
^{^} Shipments figures based on certification alone.
