= Love-Hate-Sex-Pain =

Single by Godsmack

from the album The Oracle
- Released: July 12, 2010
- Recorded: 2009
- Studio: Serenity West Studios (Hollywood, California)
- Genre: Heavy metal; alternative metal
- Length: 5:15
- Label: Universal Republic
- Songwriter: Sully Erna
- Producers: Sully Erna; Dave Fortman

Godsmack singles chronology
"Cryin' Like a Bitch" (2010)	"Love-Hate-Sex-Pain" (2010)	"Saints and Sinners" (2011)

"Love-Hate-Sex-Pain" is a song by American rock band Godsmack. It is the second single from the band's fifth studio album, The Oracle.

== Sound ==
Shannon Larkin mentioned that "Love-Hate-Sex-Pain" is one of his favorite songs from The Oracle, stating "Love-Hate-Sex-Pain is special to me because I feel it has a different sound for the band, and it was a song that Tony and I put together many years ago, and honestly never imagined it being picked for a Godsmack record. When Sully put the lyrics and melody to it, it was like seeing a child grow up."

== Release ==
The single made its way to radio stations in the United States on July 12, 2010.

On April 6, it was released as the first song from The Oracle, giving the fans the opportunity to download it through iTunes.

== Track listing ==
Digital single

No.	Title	Writer(s)	Length
1.	"Love-Hate-Sex-Pain"	Sully Erna	5:15

CD single

No.	Title	Writer(s)	Length
1.	"Love-Hate-Sex-Pain" (radio edit)	Sully Erna	4:20
2.	"Love-Hate-Sex-Pain" (album version)	Sully Erna	5:15

== Reception ==
=== Critical ===
The song has received positive reviews. Chris Akin from PitRiff.com praised the song, stating "This song might be the closest thing to a 'twist' that you get on The Oracle. A rare balladic number, this song showcases a much more musical direction than Godsmack has ever taken in the past. Sounding more like a mid-tempoed Alice In Chains song than what they've been known for." He added, "Love-Hate-Sex-Pain could very well be the song that reaches the most people." Reviewer Greg Maki from Live-Metal.net described the song as "one of The Oracle's bright spots". Aaron Titan from 411mania.com commented that "This was one of the other songs that the band leaked out ahead of the album's release and it's kind of a different route for Godsmack", adding "Very introspective feel to it, and it kind of jams with these Alice in Chains-style melancholy guitar chords that reek of despair until it hits the pendulum chorus that has some of the most simple yet interesting guitar work we've gotten from Tony Rombola in quite a while."

=== Commercial ===
"Love-Hate-Sex-Pain" climbed the Billboard Alternative Songs, the Billboard Hot Mainstream Rock Tracks and the Billboard Rock Songs, peaking at 24, two, and five respectively, and making it the band's 19th top 10 hit at active rock radio. It is the band's highest-charting song on the Rock Songs chart. Recently, the single debuted on the Billboard Heatseekers Songs and peaked at number 23.

With "Love-Hate-Sex-Pain" appearing on the Billboard Alternative Songs, Godsmack stood as the act with the most appearances on the chart without reaching the apex until 2011. The single is Godsmack's 19th charted title at the format. The band has peaked as high as No. 6 with "Voodoo" in 2000. Metal band Korn would later break the record in 2011.

=== Chart positions ===
Chart (2010)	Peak position
Billboard Rock Songs	5
Billboard Hot Mainstream Rock Tracks	2
Billboard Alternative Songs	24
Billboard Heatseekers Songs	23

== Personnel ==
- Sully Erna – vocals, producer
- Tony Rombola – lead guitar
- Robbie Merrill – bass
- Shannon Larkin – drums
- Dave Fortman – producer
