= When Legends Rise (song) =

2018 song by Godsmack

Single by Godsmack

from the album When Legends Rise
- Released: April 13, 2018
- Recorded: 2017–2018
- Genre: Alternative metal
- Length: 2:52
- Label: BMG
- Songwriters: Sully Erna; John Feldmann
- Producers: Sully Erna; Erik Ron

Godsmack singles chronology
"Bulletproof" (2018)	"When Legends Rise" (2018)	"Under Your Scars" (2018)

Music video
- "When Legends Rise" on YouTube

"When Legends Rise" is a song by American rock band Godsmack. It was the second single off of their seventh studio album When Legends Rise.

== Background and inspiration ==
In an interview with Billboard, Sully Erna told the magazine that "When Legends Rise" came from a sense of rebirth and reinvention on both personal and musical levels. In another interview, Erna provided further insight into what inspired him to write the song:

[I]t's a reflection of what I've been through in the last couple of years, where I've made a life decision to eliminate a lot of negative people and negative things in my life. I'm in a good place now, and I have some great things surrounding me. I have a great band. I have a beautiful daughter. I have a good career. My health is good the band's health is good.

Erna went on to clarify that the "Legends" part of the title was not referring to Godsmack, but rather, it was "metaphorical" and "hopefully inspirational", concluding with "I'm certainly not saying that we're the legends!"

== Track listing ==
Digital single

No.	Title	Writer(s)	Length
1.	"When Legends Rise"	Lyrics: Sully Erna, John Feldmann; Music: Sully Erna, Shannon Larkin, Robbie Merrill, Tony Rombola	2:52

== Music video ==
The music video for "When Legends Rise" was released on Jan 11, 2019. The clip, directed by Sully Erna in conjunction with Paris Visone, alternates between footage of the band performing live and highlights of pivotal moments in recent football history, concluding with a shot of the New England Patriots Super Bowl trophy. In a statement released by the band, it was revealed the clip was the result of Erna collaborating directly with the NFL for three months.

== Appearances ==
The song is featured in the musical video game Rock Band 4 as a downloadable content. Also, it was used as a preview song to promote UFC 226. Moreover, WWE utilized the song as the official theme song for its 2018, 2019 and 2020 pay-per-view events WWE Greatest Royal Rumble, Crown Jewel and Super ShowDown that were held in Saudi Arabia.

== Live performance ==
Godsmack debuted "When Legends Rise" on April 27, 2018, in Jacksonville, Florida. Since then, the song is regularly performed at the band's concerts.

== Reception ==
=== Critical ===
Reviews for "When Legends Rise" were mostly positive. Blabbermouth's reviewer Jay Gorania praised Shannon Larkin's performance on the track but noted that the chorus was "perfunctory at best." Chad Childers of Loudwire described the song as "pulsing with vitality." AllMusic's reviewer Neil Yeung described the song as a "rousing avalanche of drums and guitar" and praised Erna's vocal delivery.

=== Commercial ===
Upon its release, "When Legends Rise" entered multiple charts, including the Billboard Mainstream Rock. Like the previous single from the album, it peaked at number one where it remained for five consecutive weeks, giving Godsmack their ninth number one single on that chart.

== Personnel ==
Godsmack

- Sully Erna – vocals, rhythm guitar, production
- Tony Rombola – lead guitar
- Robbie Merrill – bass
- Shannon Larkin – drums

== Charts ==
=== Weekly charts ===
Chart (2019)	Peak position
Canada Rock (Billboard)	9
US Rock & Alternative Airplay (Billboard)	10
US Hot Rock & Alternative Songs (Billboard)	13

=== Year-end charts ===
Chart (2019)	Position
US Hot Rock & Alternative Songs (Billboard)	77
US Rock Airplay (Billboard)	50

== Certifications ==
Region	Certification	Certified units/sales
United States (RIAA)	Gold	500,000^{‡}
^{‡} Sales+streaming figures based on certification alone.
