= Speak (Godsmack song) =

Single by Godsmack

from the album IV
- Released: April 4, 2006
- Recorded: Las Vegas, Nevada
- Genre: Heavy metal
- Length: 3:57
- Label: Universal
- Songwriters: Sully Erna; Tony Rombola
- Producer: Sully Erna

Godsmack singles chronology
"Bring It On" (2005)	"Speak" (2006)	"Shine Down" (2006)

Music video
- "Speak" on YouTube

"Speak" is a single by the rock band Godsmack from their fifth album IV. It reached number one on the U.S. Mainstream Rock chart and number ten on the Modern Rock chart.

== Song origin ==
Tony Rombola wrote the music for "Speak". He recalled: "While on tour with Metallica, Robbie, Shannon and I were jamming in the dressing room. Sully Erna popped his head in the room 'cause he really liked the riff we were playin' and he pretty much wrote the melody and finished the song right then and there." "The chorus opened up in a way that I would never have thought to write", said Erna.

== Music video ==
The music video for the song (directed by Wayne Isham) shows people performing stunts on cars, motorcycles, etc. with clips of the band playing. The video also features Danny Koker from Count's Kustoms, who would later go on to star in Counting Cars.

Sully Erna told MTV.com that he wanted to keep things simple when it came to the video: "No bank-breaking special-effects wizardry — not even a single explosion. We didn't want the clip to correlate in any way with the song's lyrics. We just wanted it to emphasize power, because we feel it's a powerful song".

The end result, according to Erna, is "basically the white, rock and roll version of the 'bling' video, but instead of using Escalades and pimped-out Mercedes Benzes, we brought in some awesome muscle cars and a bunch of my buddies from New England that do these amazing stunts on motorcycles, and it just became about fast cars, hot rods, burnouts, wheelies and rock and roll."

"We hung out for the day, nothing was choreographed. It was really cool. We just got to light up the tires all day long. And as a band, the first half of the day, we got to hang around and watch these people go off on these killer machines and do the most insane stunts we've ever seen live", Erna said.

== Track listing ==
=== "Speak" [maxi single] ===
No.	Title	Writer(s)	Length
1.	"Speak"	Erna; Rombola	3:56
2.	"Spiral (Live)"	Erna; Rombola	5:35
3.	"Batalla de los Tambores (Live)"	Erna; Rombola; Merrill; Larkin	5:44

=== "Speak" [Hit Pack] ===
No.	Title	Writer(s)	Length
1.	"Speak (New Version)"	Erna; Rombola	3:57
2.	"Awake"	Erna	5:04
3.	"I Stand Alone"	Erna	4:06

== Charts ==
=== Weekly charts ===
Weekly chart performance for "Speak"
Chart (2006)	Peak position
US Billboard Hot 100	85
US Alternative Airplay (Billboard)	10
US Mainstream Rock Airplay (Billboard)	1
US Pop 100 (Billboard)	93
Venezuela Pop Rock (Record Report)	4

=== Year-end charts ===
Year-end chart performance for "Speak"
Chart (2006)	Position
US Alternative Songs (Billboard)	40
US Mainstream Rock Songs (Billboard)	2

== Personnel ==
- Sully Erna – vocals, rhythm guitar, production
- Tony Rombola – lead guitar
- Robbie Merrill – bass
- Shannon Larkin – drums
- Andy Johns – production
