= Cryin' Like a Bitch =

Single by Godsmack

from the album The Oracle
- Released: February 23, 2010
- Recorded: 2009
- Genre: Alternative metal; hard rock
- Length: 3:22 (album version)
- Label: Universal Republic
- Songwriters: James Larkin; Robbie Merrill; Salvatore Erna; Tony Rombola
- Producers: Dave Fortman; Sully Erna

Godsmack singles chronology
"Whiskey Hangover" (2009)	"Cryin' Like a Bitch" (2010)	"Love-Hate-Sex-Pain" (2010)

Music video
- "Cryin' Like a Bitch" on YouTube

"Cryin' Like a Bitch", stylized as "Cryin' Like a Bitch!!", is a song by the American rock band Godsmack, released as the first single from The Oracle.

== Sound ==
Sully Erna describing the song as one of the toughest songs on the record. "It's a really tough song, very tough song, very tough riff, the drums are very aggressive and tight, the whole groove just had an edge to it, so not only did the lyrical content match the music very well, but it also just made me feel it just needed to be a gang, a gang enhancement on the chorus."

== Song meaning ==
HardDrive Radio described the lyrics to "Cryin' Like a Bitch" as "a slam on an old bandmate that kicked Sully out of his band". In a video posted on Rockpit.com on 26 February, Sully Erna admitted that "Cryin' Like a Bitch" was inspired by events of last summer's Crüe Fest 2 tour, on which Godsmack appeared alongside headliners Mötley Crüe, along with the events with his old band.

Although Sully Erna was reluctant to say specifically who the song is about, stating "because I don't want to throw anyone under the bus," he noted, "It was more about just being fed up with prima donnas and certain rock stars in this industry that still feel they can push people around and are still relevant even though it's been about 20 years since they've had their big moment." But he admitted that one particular person gave him the idea for the song. He explains that it grew out of hearing this person whine about certain things, which got on his nerves. But he's not necessarily complaining. Erna laughs as he adds, "It's a great song so I appreciate those people being the way they are. It helps inspire me."

In a 2009 interview with Artisan News Service, Sully Erna claimed that during the Crüe Fest 2 travelling festival turned out to be "the most dramatic tour" the band have ever been on, with the kind of "rock-star garbage" on the part of the tour's headliners that Erna and his bandmates had "never seen before in their career."

I will tell you, it's been the most dramatic tour we've ever been on. I mean, talk about just craziness, man. Sometimes egos run high, man, and there's definitely been some rock-star garbage on this tour that just have never seen in our career. Every band — from Black Sabbath to Aerosmith, Rush, Metallica... you name it... They've always... I don't think there was ever a threat, you know what I mean?! Like who's gonna dwarf Metallica anyways? But there's always just been this mutual kind of like, 'We wanna put on a great show, so bring your bells and whistles, bring your show, so between you guys and us, we can make these people get a bang for their buck.' And that's really what entertainment has always been about. And so, I've never been in a position before where we felt we had to really protect this thing; it's kind of like a dog with a bone — you put us up against a wall and we're gonna come out swinging. I don't know who needs to live up to whose reputations and I don't know why some people consider music as a competition, but I will tell you that I have never been in a situation where I felt like I was out for blood, and honestly, this was the first time that I felt like, 'You know what?! If there's gonna be some people that are gonna treat other people a certain way, then I'm gonna go out there every night and fucking crush you on stage — make sure that we make you look old and fat, and go home with a nice big fat paycheck. You can sit in your world and I'll sit in mine, and I'll see you at the top again, I guess, somewhere...' I don't know. All I care about, really, is playing music and enjoying myself on the road. I'm not here to compete. Everybody has their fans, everybody has their own music, and it's supposed to be more like a brotherhood, but... I don't know. It's been a good time for us out here, but in other situations, there's definitely been some uncomfortable moments.

In an interview with the Artisan News Service, Mötley Crüe drummer Tommy Lee was asked for his comment on Erna's remarks. He refused to comment, stating that he would "stay out of all that."

During an interview with StaticMultimedia.com, drummer Shannon Larkin revealed the true story behind "Cryin' Like a Bitch", and what exactly happened at Crüe Fest:

I can't speak for the rest of the band. My only problem was the way their security treated our friends and family backstage — made it a bit uncomfortable to try to hang out normally because it was made to be such a big deal when Motley was in sight backstage, like our family or friends were gonna bother them or something, which was simply not the case. And I always hate it when the opening bands are barred from watching the headliner from a designated spot somewhere on the side of the stage, simply because if we want to watch their set (which you would think they would want) we can't just go out front and watch without it turning into a meet and greet with fans, which defeats the purpose cause we aren't watching the show then. In fairness, they blamed it on all of their pyro, but if you've ever seen Smack, you would know that we use a ton of pyro also, and we always find a spot that friends and family and opening bands can check it out. All in all, Tommy rules, and Nikki and Mick were really nice to me the two times I got to meet them. Never saw Vince.

Then he adds:

On a side note, I came up with the title 'Cryin' like a Bitch' after seeing Philip Rivers of the San Diego Chargers crying on the sidelines after a loss. That may sound cruel, but hey, I'm a Raiders fan. Nuff said.

== Release ==
The single was released on February 23. In February, the song was made available on AOL Radio's Hard Rock station.

=== Digital download ===
The single became available through iTunes US, iTunes Canada, and Amazon on March 2.

== Track listing ==
No.	Title	Length
1.	"Cryin' Like a Bitch"	3:23

== Music video ==
In an interview with Power 97, Sully Erna stated that Godsmack has finished shooting a video for the single.

The video premiered on April 15 via Myspace, and YouTube. The video features Ultimate Fighting Championship champions Chuck Liddell, Rashad Evans, Brock Lesnar, Diego Sanchez, B.J. Penn, and Matt Hughes brutally knocking out the competition and showcasing their strength while Godsmack performs the song in a warehouse.

== Live performance ==
On May 3, Godsmack made an appearance on The Tonight Show with Jay Leno in which they performed "Cryin' Like a Bitch" live for the first time.

== Chart performance ==
"Cryin' Like a Bitch" climbed the Billboard Alternative Songs, the Billboard Hot Mainstream Rock Tracks and the Billboard Rock Songs, reaching number twenty-five, one, and seven respectively, making it the band's 18th top 10 hit at active rock radio. According to Billboard.com, "Cryin' Like a Bitch" began with 4.3 million first-week audience impressions on 92 stations.

The single debuted on the Billboard Heatseekers Songs, Billboard Digital Songs, and Billboard Hot 100 at number one, fifty-nine, and seventy-four respectively. According to Billboard.com, "Cryin' Like a Bitch" is just the band's second listing on the Heatseekers Songs, and third on the Hot 100.

According to Universal Republic Records, "Cryin' Like a Bitch", which debuted February 23, 2010, had become most added new Active Rock single of the year, and had blazed to the top of the chart reaching number one in only six weeks. "Cryin' Like a Bitch" is the 15th top five hit for the group, more than artists such as Linkin Park, Foo Fighters, and others. It also marks Godsmack's record-breaking 18th top 10 single of their career.

With "Cryin' Like a Bitch" appearing on the Billboard Alternative Songs, Godsmack became the act with the most appearances on the chart without having a number one single. The single is Godsmack's 18th charted title.

== Charts ==
=== Weekly charts ===
Chart (2010)	Peak position
Canada Rock (Billboard)	16
US Billboard Hot 100	74
US Hot Rock & Alternative Songs (Billboard)	7
US Mainstream Rock Airplay (Billboard)	1

=== Year-end charts ===
Chart (2010)	Position
US Hot Rock & Alternative Songs (Billboard)	25

== Certifications ==
Region	Certification	Certified units/sales
United States (RIAA)	Gold	500,000^{‡}
^{‡} Sales+streaming figures based on certification alone.

== Personnel ==
- Sully Erna – vocals, rhythm guitar, producer
- Tony Rombola – lead guitar
- Robbie Merrill – bass
- Shannon Larkin – drums
- Dave Fortman – producer
