= 3-D (Wrathchild America album) =

Studio album by Wrathchild America
- Released: January 28, 1991
- Recorded: July 22 – September 8, 1990
- Studio: Pyramid (Ithaca, New York)
- Genres: Thrash metal; heavy metal; progressive metal; funk metal
- Length: 57:33
- Label: Atlantic Records
- Producer: Alex Perialas

Wrathchild America chronology
Climbin' the Walls (1989)	3-D (1991)

3-D is the second and final studio album by American heavy metal band Wrathchild America, released on January 28, 1991 by Atlantic Records. This was the band's last studio album before they changed their name to Souls at Zero in 1992. 3-D was not as successful as Climbin' the Walls, failing to appear on any record chart, although music videos for "Spy" and "Surrounded by Idiots" were released.

While retaining some of the thrash metal roots of its predecessor, 3-D is notable for being the band's most diverse and technical album. It leans towards other genres such as progressive and funk metal, and in particular, the instrumental "Prego" is played in a jazz fusion style, while its follow-up track "Another Nameless Face" draws a reggae influence.

== Reception ==
Professional ratings
Review scores
Source	Rating
AllMusic	4.5/5 stars

Although 3-D failed to chart on the Billboard 200, the album received generally positive reviews. Alex Henderson from AllMusic gave the album a score of four-and-a-half stars out of five, and claims that 3-D was "often described as a thrash effort for the more casual thrash fan."

== Track listing ==
1. "3-D Man" – 4:25
2. "Spy" – 4:42
3. "Gentleman Death" – 3:59
4. "Forever Alone" – 4:37
5. "Draintime" – 6:01
6. "Surrounded by Idiots" – 6:05
7. "Desert Grins" – 6:29
8. "What's Your Pleasure?" – 4:10
9. "Prego (Instrumental)" – 2:58
10. "Another Nameless Face" – 4:31
11. "//" – 5:21
12. "I Ain't Drunk, I'm Just Drinkin'" (Albert Collins cover; bonus track) – 4:15

== Personnel ==
- Brad Divens – lead vocals, bass
- Jay Abbene – guitar, mandolin, backing vocals
- Terry Carter – guitar, tenor banjo, backing vocals
- Shannon Larkin – drums, vocals
