= The Oracle (Godsmack album) =

Studio album by Godsmack
- Released: May 4, 2010
- Recorded: 2009
- Studios: Serenity West (Hollywood, California)
- Genres: Hard rock; alternative metal
- Length: 44:24; 57:11 (deluxe edition)
- Label: Universal Republic
- Producers: Sully Erna; Dave Fortman

Godsmack chronology
Good Times, Bad Times... Ten Years of Godsmack (2007)	The Oracle (2010)	Live & Inspired (2012)

Singles from The Oracle
- 1. "Whiskey Hangover" Released: June 9, 2009 (deluxe edition); 2. "Cryin' Like a Bitch" Released: February 2, 2010; 3. "Love-Hate-Sex-Pain" Released: July 12, 2010; 4. "Saints and Sinners" Released: March 3, 2011

The Oracle is the sixth studio album by American rock band Godsmack, released in the United States on May 4, 2010. It is the first Godsmack album to be produced by Dave Fortman. The Oracle marks the first Godsmack studio album to be released since 2006's IV. It received generally favorable critical reviews and became the band's third consecutive album to reach number one on the Billboard 200.

== Background and composition ==
In 2009, after taking a break for two years, Sully Erna announced writing is underway for the band's fifth studio record, with the record likely to be released May 4, 2010.

On March 16, 2009, while Godsmack were in the middle of writing the new record, Mötley Crüe announced the lineup for their second annual summer festival tour, Crüe Fest 2, which included Godsmack. As a result of that, Sully Erna stated in an interview with ArtisanNewsService on YouTube the band had to postpone the writing process until the tour was finished on September 5, 2009, "We were in the middle of writing the record, and we had kinda settle that process for a minute and postponed it. So the idea now is to finish, you know, this tour and get right into the studio, finish the record, drop it by early 2010 and fire up a huge world tour."

During Crüe Fest 2, Godsmack released their first single in almost two years since the release of "Good Times, Bad Times back in 2007. "Whiskey Hangover" reached #1 on the Billboard Hot Mainstream Rock Tracks, and became a live staple in Godsmack's shows during the summer festival.

November 11, 2009, Shannon Larkin announced the band is working with his then-Ugly Kid Joe bandmate and producer Dave Fortman with the band hoping to get the album out in February 2010. February 8, 2010, Godsmack officially named its new album The Oracle, after initially calling it Saints & Sinners. February 26, 2010, it was announced on the band's official website The Oracle will be released May 4, 2010, with the final track listing being revealed the same day.

== Development and lyrics ==
"Our goal is just to write the music that moves us, the best we can, and then assuming that there is gonna be other people out there would agree with us and enjoy it. And for the people that we do a track, that come to see us and enjoy it with us, then that's a blessing, and we are very grateful to have those people and have a career. But there is no need for us to be self-conscious about it, or all worried about how the songs are gonna do, or the record is gonna do because we know we delivered a great record in our eyes and enjoy it. All we can hope for is it touches the people the way it touches us."

— Sully Erna on writing "The Oracle" – Webisode 7

The writing process, according to Shannon Larkin, was collaborative, stating that all four members of the band wrote the songs and Sully came up with the lyrics:

"It's collaborative. We're all in the room and we write the songs. Sully steps in with the vocals. So we write all the music first typically, and then he takes the tape of music and starts doing the lyric thing, writing lyrics and melodies, and then he'll come over excited and sing it to us, and we'll be "yeah" or "nay." But he's pretty great for that because he doesn't get excited much, so when he gets something that he thinks is good, it's usually really good."

Then he adds, "Like I said, when I said collaborative, on the new record we did this all four of us in a room. Like all four, we'll play a riff, I'll come in with the drums, and next thing you know were jamming, and then it sounds like a verse, or a chorus or breakdown part. And then we'll stop. "Alright, man, we got a great verse, let's try to get a chorus for it." So, you know, that's how the process goes. So it is a full band collaboration, much more than ever."

When interviewed by Bloody Good Horror, Sully Erna described the writing process as equal collaboration between all four members of the band, stating "It was truly an equal collaboration between all four of us. We all sat down and discussed what we wanted and expected from each of us on this album, and God Damn it, we delivered every speck of it."

== Recording ==
The Oracle was recorded and produced by Dave Fortman, who has worked with bands such as Superjoint Ritual, Mudvayne, Otep, Slipknot on their new fourth studio album titled All Hope Is Gone, and Simple Plan, as well as on both of Evanescence's multi-platinum selling albums, The Open Door and Fallen.

According to Sully Erna, he was looking for a producer who is known for producing great albums. When Sully talked about some producers he is interested in working with, Shannon suggested Dave Fortman, "Got the mighty Dave Fortman producing who had made it before in a band called Ugly Kid Joe. I played with him for five years, toured the world with him. Love the guy, he's one of the funniest dudes ever. After Sully met Dave it was pretty much over because Dave is such a real pleasant guy to be around and real funny, makes you feel comfortable in all ways," Shannon said.

On working with Dave Fortman, Sully Erna announced that the band will be recording their next album with Dave Fortman again, stating that, "Let me tell you this... I will DEFINITELY record another record with him again. If not every one. That dude is not only the funniest guy I’ve ever met, but he really knows how to produce and make suggestions that are relevant and important to the decision of the song."

With Dave Fortman producing The Oracle, The band took a different technical approach to recording their songs. While working on The Oracle in the studio, the band opted for laying down one track at a time, as opposed to recording composite parts and then assembling them in a piecewise manner.

As Shannon Larkin told AwayTeam:

"One of the cool things about this album is that we're recording it one track at a time. What I mean by that is, instead of me just laying down the drum tracks and then the band coming back in and laying down all the guitar, vocals, bass and stuff…we actually do one tune and then complete it before we move on to recording the next one. It's so cool because we get to hear what everything is going to sound like almost immediately and I'm not just laying down my drum tracks and then sitting around for the rest of the time waiting for it all to be done before I get to hear anything finished. It makes it way more exciting to record like this."

Sully Erna stated that he's proud of the band's track record:

"You know, it is nice to know that we're creating stuff that's just kind of living on and that does really well in the active rock stations and the hard rock world and that kind of stuff. So we're in that middle ground. We're not quite as poppy as like Aerosmith, but yet we're not as dark and metal as, you know, the Slipknots or the Metallicas or whatever. So we're kind of like that in-between band."

He also explained the benefits of recording that way, "In the past, we've always done one instrument at a time and it takes twice as long, and half the members of the band are gone once their parts are done. This way we all got to enjoy the entire process together and every two days we could hear a rough mix of what that specific track sounded like."

In a video posted on Rockpit.com, Sully Erna encouraged the fans to buy the album, stating that:

"I think every single song on this record is really badass, and I think just for that people should go get all the songs. It has nothing to do with money, it has nothing to do with selling the whole CD or whatever, if they wanna download it, download it. But it's really about them just experiencing everything it's on this record, because it's really a great record."

== Musical themes ==
Shannon Larkin described the sound of the upcoming album as a return to the band's original sound, stating that "'Whiskey Hangover' is a good clue, and that's what we're going for. It's more simplistic than the last record — less bluesy, more heavy, but you know we wanted to get back to the original sound of the band and what made this band happen in the first place….simple heavy rock, so that's where we're kind of shooting for on this one."

When interviewed by Away-Team.com, Larkin described the sound as a sort of return to the band's self-titled album, stating that: "It's going to be a monster. The drums sound incredible, Sully Erna's voice is on fire… it's gonna be much more like the first record; much heavier, with simple, catchy guitar-driven riffs. We're working with Dave Fortman who I was lucky enough to play with in Ugly Kid Joe and who has done production for Slipknot and Mudvayne, to name a few. He and Sully are co-producing the record and they make a great team."

In an early March 2009 interview with Rockerrazzi.com, Sully Erna stated that "the album is gonna be really heavy. I mean, it's very aggressive. I'm not really sure; it's very premature right now. Right now we just finished one track for the Crüe Fest this Summer. But as far as the whole record goes, I think it's going to be a lot more in your face. I don't think there's going to be any 'Voodoo's or 'Serenity's on this one. We decided to go balls out!".

"What If?"
Sample of "What If", a song Godsmack released from "The Oracle." It was made available to download through iTunes

When asked about the difference between The Oracle and other albums Godsmack has released in the past ten years, Sully Erna stated that, "Our previous records always had various influences that we tried to have surface in the music. But this record is much more true to the heart. It is filled with everything that we have built our success on. Raw, tough, powerful grooves and big vocal melodies."

Shannon Larkin explained how the band is able to walk the line between staying true to their roots and being able to satisfy themselves creatively, stating, "Usually the riffs decide how new songs come about, with one of us showing the others a riff, and then the rest of us just jamming along until a song starts to form. If the song sounds too far from our roots (or our sound or style) then we can tell after jamming it a few times, and we either drop it or re-work it to sound more true to our roots. Satisfying ourselves creatively is pretty easy, as we aren't trying to re-invent the wheel musically – we are a blue-collar hard rock band. That said, we do side projects in which we can experiment with different textures and styles and scratch any itches to experiment in different genres."

== Title and artwork ==
The working title for the album was Saints & Sinners, named after one of the tracks on the album, but in a video posted on Rockpit.com Sully Erna explained that he started to feel as the title Saints & Sinners was not very original.

"I decided to change the name from Saints & Sinners to The Oracle and the reason being because I started doing a lot of research on Saints & Sinners, and although I liked what it represented, it's been done before. I think Whitesnake had a record in 1982 or some like that, before which I wasn't that worried about because that's almost 30 years ago, but there has been some other artists, even Spanish albums that I found called Saints & Sinners in Spanish. With all that put together, I started rethinking the name, and then with the name Godsmack, and then the title being called Saints & Sinners, it was all feeling a little bit religious to me, and that really wasn't what this record represented..."

In the same video, Sully Erna explained that The Oracle came from a name of a new instrumental he wrote for the disc, saying, "Once I wrote the instrumental...we titled [the album that] because it’s really the epitome of all rock songs. Like, if you listen to this track it almost has every transition that’s ever been created in rock music in one song."

On March 24, the album cover was made available to preview on Noisecreep.com. For the artwork, the band went with a dark red and black eclipse-like image, with light beams shining down over the band logo.

== Promotion ==
On January 15, 2010, the band joined forces with Rockpit.com to promote the album by creating a series of fifteen webisodes for Godsmack fans describing the process, rituals and methodology of making The Oracle. Each webisode is filled with exclusive content, behind the scenes footage, interviews and sneak peeks at their newest songs.

When Daniel Catullo was asked about the idea behind documenting them making The Oracle, he stated that, "We felt that over the course of 10 years of me filming the band we have done it all; the stadium show, the small intimate acoustic performance, the arena show and the mini-movie. The only thing we haven't done was document the recording of a record. Quite frankly it was the only thing left to do with them that wouldn't be repeating history!"

The first official single off the album is "Cryin' Like a Bitch". It received radio airplay on February 23, 2010.

Since the release of "Cryin' Like a Bitch", Godsmack has officially released three more songs. "Love-Hate-Sex-Pain", "What If", and "Saints and Sinners" were released on April 6, April 13, and April 26 respectively. All the songs were made available to download through iTunes.

On April 29, Sully Erna was interviewed by WAAF (FM) for their exclusive radio talk show, entitled "Godsmack Radio Takeover". During the sixty minute interview, "Love-Hate-Sex-Pain", "What If", "Good Day to Die", "Shadow of a Soul", and "Forever Shamed", were all premiered on the radio for the first time.

On May 3, Godsmack made an appearance on The Tonight Show with Jay Leno in which they performed "Cryin' Like a Bitch" live for the first time.

=== Singles ===
"Whiskey Hangover", like "I Stand Alone", was released 11 months prior to the album it appeared on, and was initially not intended to be on The Oracle; it was written for Godsmack's appearance at Crüe Fest 2. "Whiskey Hangover" later appeared as the first deluxe edition track on The Oracle. It reached No. 1 on the Billboard Hot Mainstream Rock Tracks. This would be the 17th Top 10 single for Godsmack.

"Cryin' Like a Bitch"
Sample of "Cryin' Like A Bitch", the first single to be released from "The Oracle", it was made available to download through iTunes.

The second single, "Cryin' Like a Bitch", climbed the Billboard Alternative Songs, the Billboard Hot Mainstream Rock Tracks, and the Billboard Rock Songs, reaching No. 25, one, and seven respectively, making it the band's 18th Top 10 hit at active rock radio. According to Billboard.com, "Cryin' Like a Bitch" began with 4.3 million first-week audience impressions on 92 stations.

The single debuted on the Billboard Heatseekers Songs, Billboard Digital Songs, and Billboard Hot 100 at No. 1, 59, and 74 respectively. According to Billboard.com, "Cryin' Like a Bitch" is just the band's second listing on the Heatseekers Songs and third on the Hot 100.

"Cryin' Like a Bitch" is the sixth No. 1 hit and 15th Top 5 hit for the group, more than artists such as Linkin Park, Foo Fighters, and others. It also marks Godsmack's record-breaking 18th Top 10 single of their career.

On July 12, the third single, "Love-Hate-Sex-Pain", made its way to radio stations in the United States. Since its release as a single, the song climbed the Billboard Alternative Songs, the Billboard Hot Mainstream Rock Tracks and the Billboard Rock Songs peaking at No. 26, two, and five respectively, making it the band's 19th Top 10 hit on active rock radio. The single debuted on the Billboard Heatseekers Songs at No. 25.

With "Love-Hate-Sex-Pain" appearing on the Billboard Alternative Songs, Godsmack now stands as the act with the most appearances on the chart without reaching the apex. The single is Godsmack's 19th charted title at the format. The band has peaked as high as No. 6 with "Voodoo" in 2000.

Upon its release as a single on March 3, "Saints and Sinners" entered both Billboard Hot Mainstream Rock Tracks and the Billboard Rock Songs, peaking at No. 25 and 35 respectively.

== Release ==
On May 4, 2010, The Oracle was released in the United States. The album was also made available to download through Amazon as well as iTunes. On May 5, 2010, and in less than 24 hours of the album being released, The Oracle reached #1 on the US and Canadian iTunes stores.

Internationally, The Oracle was released in Sweden on May 3, in Austria, Germany, Netherlands and Switzerland on May 7, in Finland on May 12, and in the United Kingdom on May 24.

Two editions of the album are currently available, the standard edition, which consists of a CD that contains 10 tracks. And the deluxe edition, which consists of a CD and a DVD, with the DVD including two bonus tracks including the song "Whiskey Hangover".

== Critical reception ==
Professional ratings
Aggregate scores
Source	Rating
Metacritic	60/100
Review scores
Source	Rating
411mania	8.5/10 stars
Allmusic	3/5 stars
Billboard	favorable
Entertainment Weekly	C−
Kerrang!	2/5 stars
LiveMetalNet	7.5/10 stars
PureGrainAudio	9/10 stars
Q	3/5 stars
Starpulse	A

The Oracle has been praised by fans as well as critics as a comeback for Godsmack after their fourth studio album. So far, the album has received a score of 60 out of 100 from Metacritic based on some "mixed or average reviews".

- Allmusic was one of the first websites to comment on The Oracle, with their reviewer Jason Ankeny describing the album' as "the most aggressive disc Godsmack have issued since their debut", awarding it three stars out of five, and praising it for being a return to the band original sound, stating, "The Oracle is, if nothing else, a return to the band’s signature sound of yore. It seems as if Godsmack heard the cry of their dedicated hoard and went back to making the kind of record that defined them.", then he added, "Those fans seeking a return to Godsmack’s roots will not be disappointed; for others, the sound may be a retrenchment because there was no place else for them to go. The only undebatable thing is that The Oracle is the most aggressive disc Godsmack have issued since their debut."
- Aaron Titan from 411mania.com gave the album a positive review, awarding it eight and a half stars out of ten, stating "It’s definitely better than IV", then he added, "The album kind of rides out the awesomeness of that track with Saints and Sinners and War and Peace and then climbs with the off-beat Love-Hate-Sex-Pain." He also praised the band for choosing "The Oracle" to be the last track, stating "This is a slamming instrumental that was a fantastic choice to close out the album."
- Scott McLennan from The Boston Globe commented that the album has "fresh moments, such as the scrappy delivery of What If and the up-tempo snap of War and Peace", then he added, "On the few occasions that he is freed from formulaic constraints, guitarist Tony Rombola effectively knocks some texture into these otherwise slick and efficient songs. Godsmack also sticks to its stock songwriting topics — spiritual angst, mental torment, and social discomfort. The Oracle certainly reiterates all that has made Godsmack a successful band, and it proves that these locally bred players are capable of big-sounding, attention-grabbing music."

== Commercial performance ==
The Oracle is credited for being the first album by a hard rock band to ever reach number one in 2010, selling 117,500 copies in its first week of release, becoming Godsmack's third consecutive album to do so, and making Godsmack the seventh rock band to ever reach number one with three consecutive regular studio albums. Digitally, the album topped the iTunes best-selling albums chart, selling nearly 23,000 copies. In Canada, The Oracle debuted at number two, selling 7,000 copies. The band previous high-water mark came with the No. 4 peak of IV in 2006. Since its release on May 4, The Oracle has sold more than 500,000 copies in the US and in late 2011 the album received a gold certification in the US.

== Track listing ==
All tracks are written by Godsmack.

Standard single disc edition
No.	Title	Length
1.	"Cryin' Like a Bitch"	3:23
2.	"Saints and Sinners"	4:09
3.	"War and Peace"	3:09
4.	"Love-Hate-Sex-Pain"	5:15
5.	"What If?"	6:35
6.	"Devil's Swing"	3:30
7.	"Good Day to Die"	3:55
8.	"Forever Shamed"	3:23
9.	"Shadow of a Soul"	4:44
10.	"The Oracle" (instrumental)	6:22
Total length:		44:24

Deluxe / limited editions
No.	Title	Length
11.	"Whiskey Hangover"	3:47
12.	"I Blame You"	3:08
13.	"The Departed" (iTunes bonus track)	5:52
Total length:		57:11

Additional notes

- The song "The Departed" is from Sully Erna's album Avalon.

== Personnel ==
Godsmack

- Sully Erna – vocals, rhythm guitar, harmonica, producer
- Tony Rombola – lead guitar, backing vocals
- Robbie Merrill – bass guitar, backing vocals
- Shannon Larkin – drums, backing vocals

Additional personnel

- Irina Chirkova – cello on "The Oracle"
- Lisa Guyer – backing vocals on "The Departed"

Production

- Dave Fortman – Producer
- Bob Ludwig – Mastering
- Jeremy Parker – Engineer
- Steve Catizone – Engineer, Additional Production
- AJ Clark – Assistant Engineer
- William Vignola – Sample Programming
- Kevin Sheehy – Personal Assistant
- Brad Forsyth – Illustrations
- John Kurzweg – Producer/Engineer/Mixer – "Whiskey Hangover"

"The Making of The Oracle" DVD

- Troy Smith – Director
- Karen Gainer – Producer
- Noah Gelb – Director

== Charts ==
=== Weekly charts ===
Weekly chart performance for The Oracle
Chart (2010)	Peak position
Canadian Albums (Billboard)	2
German Albums (Offizielle Top 100)	72
Greek Albums (IFPI)	11
US Billboard 200	1
US Top Alternative Albums (Billboard)	1
US Top Hard Rock Albums (Billboard)	1
US Top Rock Albums (Billboard)	1

=== Year-end charts ===
Year-end chart performance for The Oracle
Chart (2010)	Position
US Billboard 200	71
US Top Rock Albums (Billboard)	13

== Certifications ==
Certifications for The Oracle
Region	Certification	Certified units/sales
United States (RIAA)	Gold	500,000^{^}
^{^} Shipments figures based on certification alone.

== Release history ==
Release dates and formats for The Oracle
Country	Date
Sweden	May 3, 2010
United States	May 4, 2010
Austria	May 7, 2010
Germany	May 7, 2010
Netherlands	May 7, 2010
Poland	May 7, 2010
Switzerland	May 7, 2010
Finland	May 12, 2010
United Kingdom	May 24, 2010
