= Brad Divens =

American rock musician

- Genres: Thrash metal, heavy metal, hard rock
- Occupation: Musician
- Instruments: Bass, guitar, vocals
- Formerly of: Wrathchild America, Souls at Zero, Kix

Brad Divens is an American rock musician. He was the bassist and lead vocalist for Souls at Zero, formerly known as Wrathchild America. His vocal style often draws comparisons to James Hetfield (Metallica). Previously, Divens played guitar with the Maryland band Kix on their Cool Kids album.

He has since worked as a front of house audio engineer for acts such as Linkin Park, Cyndi Lauper, Garbage, HIM, Bob Seger and the Silver Bullet Band, Mötley Crüe, Jane's Addiction, Enrique Iglesias, and most recently Disturbed. Brad is currently the cohost for the popular podcast 'Brad and Rik: Raw and Unfiltered' with Rik Parks.

== Discography ==
Kix

- Cool Kids (1983)

Wrathchild America

- Climbin' the Walls (1989)
- 3-D (1991)

Souls at Zero

- Souls at Zero (1993)
- Six-T-Six (EP) (1994)
- A Taste for the Perverse
