= The Enemy (Godsmack song) =

Single by Godsmack

from the album IV
- Released: October 31, 2006
- Recorded: 2005
- Genre: Heavy metal; alternative metal
- Length: 4:07
- Label: Republic/Universal
- Songwriter: Sully Erna
- Producers: Sully Erna; Andy Johns

Godsmack singles chronology
"Shine Down" (2006)	"The Enemy" (2006)	"Good Times Bad Times" (2007)

"The Enemy" is a song by American rock band Godsmack and the last single from their album IV. After its release in October 2006, the song landed at number four on the Mainstream Rock Tracks, just like Godsmack's previous single "Shine Down". "The Enemy" is performed at almost every show on the band's "IV Tour", and was also the official theme song for WWE's 2006 SummerSlam PPV. This song was also included in the video game WWE SmackDown vs. Raw 2007.

"The Enemy" is Jason MacDonald's most recent entrance theme in UFC Championship.

== Song meaning ==
According to lead singer Sully Erna, the song is about a guy who was his friend. When Godsmack became popular, the guy was going with Erna to clubs and parties. They quit hanging out as much but the guy continued to go out to places where people knew that he knew the band. He would hang out in the VIP rooms and tell people that Godsmack was coming. Toward the end of the night, he would make up an excuse as to why Godsmack wasn't showing up. Sully Erna felt betrayed by somebody using his name and image to acquire their own fame.

== Charts ==
=== Weekly charts ===
Weekly chart performance for "The Enemy"
Chart (2007)	Peak position
US Mainstream Rock (Billboard)	4

=== Year-end charts ===
Year-end chart performance for "The Enemy"
Chart (2007)	Position
US Mainstream Rock Songs (Billboard)	10
