= IV (Godsmack album) =

Studio album by Godsmack
- Released: April 25, 2006
- Recorded: 2005
- Studio: Spiral Recording Studios (Hollywood, California)
- Genres: Alternative metal; hard rock
- Length: 61:55
- Label: Universal Republic
- Producers: Sully Erna; Andy Johns

Godsmack chronology
The Other Side (2004)	IV (2006)	Good Times, Bad Times... Ten Years of Godsmack (2007)

Singles from IV
- 1. "Speak" Released: April 4, 2006; 2. "Shine Down" Released: June 13, 2006; 3. "The Enemy" Released: October 31, 2006

Professional ratings
Review scores
Source	Rating
Allmusic	3/5 stars
Rolling Stone	2/5 stars
Ultimate Guitar	9/10 stars
411mania	8/10 stars

IV is the fifth studio album by American rock band Godsmack, released on April 25, 2006. This is Godsmack's only studio album produced by Andy Johns.

== Recording and lyrical themes ==
According to Sully Erna: "This is the first time I've been totally honest, speaking the truth about real situations," he says. "In the past I was always pointing a finger, whether at myself or someone else, but I've come clean with myself and the people I can now love and care about.

This record is about the light at the end of the tunnel, coming out of that funk, recognizing the dark parts of our lives, but committing to finding a way out of them."

With acclaimed engineer Andy Johns, who worked on such Led Zeppelin classics as "Stairway to Heaven" and "When the Levee Breaks", as well as albums by the Rolling Stones and Van Halen, Godsmack transitions from their metal roots to full-fledged classic blues-rockers.

Recorded at Spiral Recording Studio in Los Angeles, Godsmack had the luxury, for the first time, of writing and recording IV without being on the road or having to rush to meet a deadline. They wrote 35 tracks, recorded 17, and picked the best of them to go on the disc.

"There were a lot of things that happened on this record that were different than the way we worked in the past," explains Erna. "And one of those was me letting go of the steering wheel a bit, allowing the band control over the writing and me stepping away to an outside point of view and coming up with lyrics for what I viewed as another group entirely," he says.

The lyrical themes, about speaking the truth and coming clean, are echoed in "Livin' in Sin", a song that inspired Erna to reveal to his girlfriend his infidelities, a theme he also explores in "The Enemy". "I was blocked for months," he says. "Writing that song opened up the floodgates and made me realize what this record was about."

"Shine Down" was another example of the band wrenching light from dark. "That one's not just a song of hope, but of realistic expectations," explains Erna. "It's about being human and having problems. About not being able to lift your head off the pillow, but knowing there's somebody out there that watches over us and a universe that protects us. I knew this new year would be rocking for us. It's not religious, but spiritual."

"Voodoo Too" is a sequel to their prior single "Voodoo", and features a bit of the ending of "Voodoo" in the beginning in the song.

== Title ==
The album's minimalist name "IV" derives not only from its being the band's fourth studio album, but also from a running piece of backstage humor, as related by Larkin and Erna:

We have this security guy, a big, tough guy named J.C. He's another Boston guy. And in Boston, it's "fou." They don't really have the "R." It's not "four," it's "fou." He'd be hanging around backstage and chicks would walk by and he would rate them from 1 to 10. But if it wasn't a 10, there was no 1, 2, 3, or 5. It was always you were a "ten" or a "fou." He just pulled the funniest things. Sometimes, he'd just hold up four fingers and wouldn't have to say it anymore, and we'd all just burst out laughing. And then the funniest one, this guy walked by with a chick on each arm, and he goes, "Hey, bub, two fous don't make an eight!" So when it came up, it's our fourth full-length record, everybody was like, "Fou!" And we were like, "That's it, Man." We're not trying to break any records for originality here. I know there's Black Sabbath Vol. 4, Foreigner 4, Led Zeppelin IV, a million IVs. We just thought it's fitting.

== Commercial performance ==
IV sold 211,000 copies in the U.S. in its first week of release, debuting at #1 on the Billboard 200 chart. This figure is a bit less than the 267,000 units sold by Godsmack's third studio album, Faceless, back in April 2003, and the 256,000 first-week tally achieved by 2000's Awake. IV also debuted at number four on the Top Canadian Albums and number one on the Top Internet Albums.

== Track listing ==
All tracks are written by Sully Erna, except where noted.

No.	Title	Writer(s)	Length
1.	"Livin' in Sin"	Erna, Tony Rombola, Robbie Merrill, Shannon Larkin	4:40
2.	"Speak" (dialogue by John Kosco of Dropbox)	Erna, Rombola	3:58
3.	"The Enemy"		4:08
4.	"Shine Down"		5:02
5.	"Hollow" (featuring Lisa Guyer)	Erna, Rombola	4:33
6.	"No Rest for the Wicked"		4:38
7.	"Bleeding Me"		3:38
8.	"Voodoo Too"	Erna, Rombola, Merrill, Larkin	5:27
9.	"Temptation"		4:07
10.	"Mama"		5:15
11.	"One Rainy Day" (is 7:21 in length and includes the hidden track "Safe and Sound", which begins at 12:21)	Erna, Rombola, Merrill, Larkin	16:40
Total length:			61:55

iTunes bonus track
No.	Title	Length
12.	"I Stand Alone" (Live)	3:48
Total length:		65:42

Best Buy bonus track
No.	Title	Length
12.	"Safe and Sound"	4:20
Total length:		66:15

Target bonus track
No.	Title	Length
12.	"I Thought"	4:15
Total length:		66:09

Special edition
No.	Title	Length
12.	"Safe and Sound"	4:20
13.	"I Thought"	4:14
Total length:		70:29

== Personnel ==
Godsmack

- Sully Erna – vocals, rhythm guitar, harmonica, production, talk box on "No Rest for the Wicked" and "Safe and Sound"
- Tony Rombola – lead guitar
- Robbie Merrill – bass
- Shannon Larkin – drums, percussion

Additional

- P. R. Brown – package design
- Kent Hertz – engineering, digital editing
- Andy Johns – production, engineering, mixing
- Clay Patrick McBride – photography
- Dave Schultz – mastering
- Kevin Sheehy – personal assistant
- Doug Strub – engineering

== Charts ==
=== Weekly charts ===
Weekly chart performance for IV
Chart (2006)	Peak position
Austrian Albums (Ö3 Austria)	65
Canadian Albums (Billboard)	4
German Albums (Offizielle Top 100)	56
New Zealand Heatseekers Albums (RIANZ)	3
Swiss Albums (Schweizer Hitparade)	100
UK Rock & Metal Albums (Official Charts)	13
US Billboard 200	1
US Indie Store Album Sales (Billboard)	2
US Top Rock Albums (Billboard)	1

=== Year-end charts ===
Year-end chart performance for IV
Chart (2006)	Position
US Billboard 200	88
US Top Rock Albums (Billboard)	19

== Certifications ==
Certifications for IV
Region	Certification	Certified units/sales
United States (RIAA)	Gold	500,000^{^}
^{^} Shipments figures based on certification alone.
