= Lighting Up the Sky =

Studio album by Godsmack
- Released: February 24, 2023
- Recorded: 2022
- Studio: GSHQ Studios (Derry, New Hampshire)
- Genres: Hard rock; alternative metal
- Length: 49:26
- Label: BMG
- Producers: Mudrock; Sully Erna

Godsmack chronology
When Legends Rise (2018)	Lighting Up the Sky (2023)	Live at Mohegan Sun (2026)

Singles from Lighting Up the Sky
- 1. "Surrender" Released: September 28, 2022; 2. "You and I" Released: November 11, 2022; 3. "Soul on Fire" Released: February 24, 2023; 4. "Truth" Released: February 13, 2024

Professional ratings
Review scores
Source	Rating
AllMusic	3.5/5 stars
Blabbermouth.net	8/10
Spill Magazine	4/5 spills

Lighting Up the Sky is the ninth studio album by American rock band Godsmack. It was released on February 24, 2023, five years after their last studio album When Legends Rise, making it the longest gap between two studio albums by Godsmack. This album is also the last to feature guitarist Tony Rombola and drummer Shannon Larkin before they left the band in 2025.

== Background ==
"It's the most important record, I think, we've ever written and recorded. I've never been that artist who says, 'Oh, this record is our newest record. It's our best work ever.' You can read any interview you want over my whole career, and you've never heard me say it. I've always loved our records [and] I always knew there would be some good singles on it and hoped it did well, but I was never the guy that said, 'This is our best fucking work ever.' And I'm telling you right now this is our best fucking work ever. And it's because it's emotional, man. This is the last record we're ever gonna do. This is the last run around the mill for us."

— Sully Erna on Lighting Up the Sky

While on tour promoting When Legends Rise, news of a follow-up to the album began circulating as early as August 2019 when frontman Sully Erna revealed in an interview with Canada's iHeartRadio that the band has been preparing to begin the songwriting process for the album. Several months later, in a video message dated March 23, 2020, and shared via the Twitter account of SiriusXM, drummer Shannon Larkin and lead guitarist Tony Rambola confirmed the band had been writing music for the album. Shortly after, and during an appearance on Sirius XM Radio's Trunk Nation, Sully Erna admitted that, while his band had been compiling some ideas, he was lacking the inspiration to write anything. Nonetheless, he assured the fans that the new album would be finished sooner than later:

We are gonna focus this year, and I will get it done. I do this every time I have to record a record, I swear to you. I go, 'I don't know what to talk about. I have no content. I don't know what my lyrics are gonna sound like.' I have nothing. I'm bored. I'm not depressed. I'm not mad. Before, when I was mad, I had so many things to write about. Now I'm not mad anymore. I don't know how to write songs sometimes when I'm not upset or emotional about something. So, it'll come. And when it does, I'm sure it'll be good.

In a May 4, 2021 appearance on The VR Sessions' "Riff On It", Sully Erna revealed that the band had written 12 songs for the album in just three weeks, and that the band was in the process of writing the lyrics and laying down all the melodies. In an April 23, 2022 interview with WJRR, Erna said that the band had recorded the new album with a new single expected to hit the airwaves in mid-to-late summer and that the album could be the band's last.

While being interviewed by Pablo of the Minneapolis radio station 93X, Erna confirmed that Lighting Up the Sky would indeed be Godsmack's last body of work but went on to clarify that the band will not be retiring from performing or touring after this album. In an Instagram video posted to Sully's own account on October 10, 2022, he further assured the fans that the band members "are getting along better than ever" and that they "plan on continuing to tour" long after the album's release, with a greatest hits-style of touring being planned for the future. He later clarified that it would be the band's last "unless we just decide one day, 'Yeah, one more for the road.'"

== Composition and themes ==
Frontman Sully Erna described the sound of Lighting Up the Sky as "high-voltage, high-energy, hard rock album, packed with melodies, packed with good hooks, big grooves, great guitar solos." He said that it is a "true hard rock record" that is worthy of being the band's last studio album. Lighting Up the Sky was co-produced by Erna and record producer Andrew Murdock, who is best known for producing the band's first two multi-platinum albums Godsmack and Awake, as well as for his work with Avenged Sevenfold and Alice Cooper.

Like its predecessors, Lighting Up the Sky is based on Sully Erna's own personal life experiences as he stated during an interview with Audacy:

This is a record that even if you don't know the stories behind it -- which is really based on my life, my entire career, the journey that I took from the time I began through all the ups and downs... all the way to appreciating my band again, getting over those hurdles, having so much respect and love for those guys -- to the last song, which is called 'Lighting Up The Sky,' which is the title track.

Elaborating further, he revealed that the title track itself is about him looking back at his journey, reflecting on it, and that if he could go back in time, what he would do differently and what advice he would give his younger self. He did, however, admit that none of that was planned, but rather "this really kind of mystical thing happened" where he felt "the universe wrote this record."

== Promotion ==
To promote the album, Godsmack released their first single in four years titled "Surrender" on September 28, 2022. The day after, the band held a private listening party at the Circa Resort & Casino in Las Vegas. During the listening party which was attended by roughly sixty radio and media personnel, the band played five songs from the album while frontman Sully Erna talked about the writing and recording process for each one.

On November 11, 2022, the band released "You and I" as the second single from the album.

== Commercial performance ==
Lighting Up the Sky debuted at number nineteen on the US Billboard 200, and No. 1 on the US Top Hard Rock Albums chart with 21,000 album-equivalent units, of which 18,000 were pure album sales and 3,000 were streaming units. The album also debuted Top-10 in Austria, and Germany. "Surrender", the album's lead single, peaked at No. 1 on the Billboard Mainstream Rock Airplay chart in November 2022.

== Track listing ==
No.	Title	Writer(s)	Length
1.	"You and I"	Salvatore Erna	5:16
2.	"Red White & Blue"	Erna; Tony Rombola	4:04
3.	"Surrender"	Erna; Erik Ron	3:40
4.	"What About Me"	Erna; Rombola	3:55
5.	"Truth"	Erna	4:33
6.	"Hell's Not Dead"	Erna	4:50
7.	"Soul on Fire"	Erna	4:05
8.	"Let's Go"	Erna	5:40
9.	"Best of Times"	Erna; Rombola	3:36
10.	"Growing Old"	Erna; Rombola; Shannon Larkin	5:01
11.	"Lighting Up the Sky"	Erna; Rombola	4:46
Total length:			49:26

== Personnel ==
Godsmack

- Sully Erna – lead vocals, rhythm guitar, production, Moog (track 1); acoustic guitar, drums, keyboards (5); background vocals, organ, piano (10)
- Tony Rombola – lead guitar
- Robbie Merrill – bass guitar
- Shannon Larkin – drums (1–4, 6–10)

Technical

- Mudrock – production (1, 2, 4–10), co-production (3), engineering (all tracks)
- Ted Jensen – mastering
- Dave Fortman – mixing
- Ai Fujisaki – engineering assistance
- Chad Zuchegno – engineering assistance
- Pat Rowe – engineering assistance

== Charts ==
Chart performance for Lighting Up the Sky
Chart (2023)	Peak position
Australian Physical Albums (ARIA)	21
Austrian Albums (Ö3 Austria)	5
Belgian Albums (Ultratop Wallonia)	144
Canadian Albums (Billboard)	22
German Albums (Offizielle Top 100)	10
Scottish Albums (Official Charts)	48
Swiss Albums (Schweizer Hitparade)	17
UK Physical Albums (OCC)	35
UK Independent Albums (Official Charts)	16
UK Rock & Metal Albums (Official Charts)	7
US Billboard 200	19
US Independent Albums (Billboard)	3
US Top Hard Rock Albums (Billboard)	1
US Top Rock Albums (Billboard)	3
