= Touché (Godsmack song) =

Single by Godsmack

from the album The Other Side
- Released: July 13, 2004
- Recorded: 2003
- Genre: Acoustic rock
- Length: 3:38
- Label: Republic/Universal
- Songwriters: John Kosco; Lee Richards; Sully Erna
- Producer: Sully Erna

Godsmack singles chronology
"Running Blind" (2004)	"Touché" (2004)	"Bring It On" (2005)

"Touché" is a song by American rock band Godsmack. It was released as the second and last single from their acoustic EP The Other Side. The song features a mellow sound and harmonics. It also features singer John Kosco and guitarist Lee Richards of the band Dropbox (Richards himself was the original lead guitarist of Godsmack). The song was used as a secondary theme song for World Wrestling Entertainment's WrestleMania XX.

== Chart positions ==
Chart (2004)	Peak position
US Alternative Airplay (Billboard)	33
US Mainstream Rock (Billboard)	7
