= Six-T-Six =

EP by Souls at Zero
- Released: 1994
- Genre: Groove metal
- Length: 22:32
- Label: Energy
- Producer: Drew Mazurek

Souls at Zero chronology
Souls at Zero (1993)	Six-T-Six (1994)	A Taste for the Perverse (1995)

Six-T-Six is the first EP by American heavy metal band Souls at Zero.

== Track listing ==
All songs written and composed by Souls at Zero, unless otherwise noted.

No.	Title	Length
1.	"Don't Ask"	03:33
2.	"Underneath"	05:40
3.	"Flies"	02:44
4.	"Hardline" (Demo '92)	04:36
5.	"I Against I" (Bad Brains cover)	03:44
6.	"When the Shit Hits the Fan" (Circle Jerks cover)	02:15

== Personnel ==
- Brad Divens – lead vocals, bass
- Jay Abbene – guitars
- Terry Carter – guitars
- Shannon Larkin – drums

Production

Drew Mazurek – engineer

== Reception ==
- AllMusic
