= Climbin' the Walls =

Studio album by Wrathchild America
- Released: August 22, 1989
- Recorded: May 1988
- Studios: Amigo Studios, Los Angeles
- Genres: Thrash metal, heavy metal
- Length: 43:44
- Label: Atlantic Records
- Producers: Mark Dearnley, Wrathchild America

Wrathchild America chronology
Climbin' the Walls (1989)	3-D (1991)

Climbin' the Walls is the debut studio album by American heavy metal band Wrathchild America, released in 1989 by Atlantic Records. Although the album was recorded in May 1988, its release was delayed for a whole year, due to both label and legal issues that resulted in the band changing their name from Wrathchild to Wrathchild America, in order to avoid confusion with the British band with the same name.

Climbin' the Walls was moderately successful, becoming the band's only album to chart on the Billboard 200, where it peaked at number 190. A music video for the song "Climbin' the Walls" was released to promote the album.

== Reception ==
Professional ratings
Review scores
Source	Rating
AllMusic	2/5 stars
Metal Hammer	2/5 stars
Rock Hard	7/10

Climbin' the Walls received generally positive reviews. Eduardo Rivadavia from AllMusic only gave the album a score of two stars out of five but noted the "speedy, muscular riffs, complex time changes, and superb drumming."

== Track listing ==
No.	Title	Writer(s)	Length
1.	"Climbin' the Walls"	Wrathchild America	4:28
2.	"Hell's Gate"	Wrathchild America	4:06
3.	"No Deposit, No Return"	Kevin Keller, Wrathchild America	3:21
4.	"Hernia" (instrumental)	Wrathchild America	3:20
5.	"London After Midnight"	Kevin Keller, Wrathchild America	5:55
6.	"Candy from a Madman"	Kevin Keller, Wrathchild America	5:44
7.	"Silent Darkness (Smothered Life)"	Wrathchild America	4:29
8.	"Time" (Pink Floyd cover)	David Gilmour, Nick Mason, Roger Waters, Richard Wright	5:39
9.	"Day of the Thunder"	Kevin Keller, Wrathchild America	6:37

== Personnel ==
- Brad Divens – lead vocals, 4, 5, and 12 string bass
- Jay Abbene – guitar, backing vocals
- Terry Carter – 6 and 12 string guitars, vocals
- Shannon Larkin – drums, vocals
