= Behind the Player: Shannon Larkin =

Behind The Player: Shannon Larkin

Video by Shannon Larkin
- Released: November 1, 2008
- Length: 72:00
- Label: IMV
- Director: Leon Melas
- Producers: Ken Mayer & Sean E DeMott

Behind The Player: Shannon Larkin is an Interactive Music Video featuring Godsmack drummer Shannon Larkin. Released on November 1, 2008 by IMV, the DVD features Shannon giving in-depth drum lessons for how to play "Voodoo" and "Straight Out of Line" by Godsmack and an intimate behind-the scenes look at his life as a professional musician, including rare photos and video. The DVD also includes Shannon jamming the two tracks with Godsmack bassist Robbie Merrill, as well as other bonus material.

IMV donates $.25 from the sale of each Behind the Player DVD to Little Kids Rock, an organization that gets instruments in the hands of underprivileged kids.

== Contents ==
Behind The Player

Shannon talks about his background, influences and gear, including rare photos and video

"Voodoo" by Godsmack

- Lesson: Shannon gives an in-depth drum lesson for how to play the song
- Jam: Shannon jams the track with Godsmack bassist Robbie Merrill

"Straight Out of Line" by Godsmack

- Lesson: Shannon gives an in-depth drum lesson for how to play the song
- Jam: Shannon jams the track with Godsmack bassist Robbie Merrill

Special features

- Godsmack: Live trailer
- Little Kids Rock promotional video

== Personnel ==
- Produced By: Ken Mayer & Sean E Demott
- Directed By: Leon Melas
- Executive Producer: Rick Donaleshen
- Associate Producer: Shane Hall
- Director Of Photography: Ken Barrows
- Sound Engineer: Tim Harkins
- Edited By: Jeff Morose
- Mixed By: Matt Chidgey & Cedrick Courtois
- Graphics By: Thayer DeMay
- Camera Operators: Mike Chateneuf, Kieth Mcnulty, Chris Shaw, Doug Cragoe
- Technical Director: Tyler Bourns

- Gaffer: John Parker
- Assistant Director: Matt Pick
- Production Assistant: Laine Proctor
- Lighting And Grip: Mcnulty Nielson
- Artist Hospitality: Sasha Mayer
- Shot At: Korn's Elementree Studios
- Special Guest: Robbie Merrill
- Cover Photo By:
- Video Courtesy Of: Rob Shanahan, Shane Hall, Universal Records, Yamaha, Toca Percussion
- Photos Courtesy Of: Joes Testa, Neil Zlozower, Chad Lee, Shane Hall, Stephanie Pick
