= Something Different (Godsmack song) =

Single by Godsmack

from the album 1000hp
- Released: 13 September 2014
- Genre: Post-grunge
- Length: 4:42
- Label: Republic
- Songwriter: Sully Erna

Godsmack singles chronology
"1000hp" (2014)	"Something Different" (2014)	"What's Next" (2015)

Music video
- "Something Different" on YouTube

"Something Different" is a song by the rock band Godsmack. It served as the second single from the band's sixth studio album 1000hp. The song was released in 13 September 2014.

== Track listing ==
Digital single
No.	Title	Length
1.	"Something Different"	4:42

== Charts ==
Chart (2014)	Peak position
US Hot Rock & Alternative Songs (Billboard)	38
US Rock & Alternative Airplay (Billboard)	18
US Mainstream Rock (Billboard)	6
