= When Legends Rise =

2018 studio album by Godsmack

Studio album by Godsmack
- Released: April 27, 2018
- Recorded: 2017–2018
- Studio: GSHQ Studios (Derry, New Hampshire)
- Genre: Hard rock
- Length: 38:16
- Label: BMG
- Producers: Erik Ron; Sully Erna

Godsmack chronology
1000hp (2014)	When Legends Rise (2018)	Lighting Up the Sky (2023)

Singles from When Legends Rise
- 1. "Bulletproof" Released: February 28, 2018; 2. "When Legends Rise" Released: April 13, 2018; 3. "Under Your Scars" Released: March 28, 2019; 4. "Unforgettable" Released: February 4, 2020

When Legends Rise is the eighth studio album by American rock band Godsmack. It was released on April 27, 2018. It marks the band's first album away from heavy metal into a more hard rock sound. The album's first single, "Bulletproof", was released ahead of the album in February 2018. All four singles from the album reached number one on the US Billboard Mainstream Rock Songs chart. The album became certified Gold by the RIAA in September 2021 for selling over 500,000 copies.

== Background ==
As early as 2015, frontman Sully Erna spoke of his desire to create a new sound for Godsmack in their next album. He expressed his desire to change how the band had been lumped into the heavy metal genre, and desired to branch out into a more hard rock sound. He later described the album in 2017 as a "reinvention" for the band, as a "new chapter" juxtaposed against older albums, of which he described as "vintage classic Godsmack". The band worked with music producer Erik Ron for the album in an effort to help the band approach the album from a new direction. Erna described the album:

It was just about evolving as a songwriter. I wanted to stretch my wings even further, to use all of the experiences I've had writing different types of music over the years and apply that to finding a way to introduce a newer, fresher, more mature sound, while still maintaining the power of Godsmack."

The first song recorded for the album with Ron was its first single "Bulletproof"; the band was so happy with the result that they worked with Ron on a second track, "Take It to the Edge". The production by Ron convinced the band to work with him on the entire album. Erna also produced.

== Release and promotion ==
The album's name, When Legends Rise, and release date, April 27, 2018, were announced on February 28, 2018. The band released the first single, "Bulletproof", on the same date, and as of May 2018, had peaked at number one on the Billboard Mainstream Rock Songs chart. The title track "When Legends Rise" was released as a single on April 13, and was used by WWE as the official theme song for the 2018, 2019 and 2020 WWE PPV events that were held in Saudi Arabia. The 2018 MTV Movie & TV Awards used "Bulletproof" in the Best Villain montage to highlight Josh Brolin's performance as Thanos from Avengers: Infinity War while "When Legends Rise" was played in the Movie of the Year montage in the vignette for Black Panther.

In April 2020 the band released the official music video of "Unforgettable" that featured 400 middle school kids that were gathered by Sully to augment the band's performance of the song. The official video directed by Noah Berlow, who also assisted in the editing of the "Bulletproof" "Directors cut". The video was shot at the SNHU Arena in Manchester, New Hampshire.

The video directed by Noah Berlow and produced by Gautam Singhani completed a two-year process that had the band involving students, who starting the recording of this version of the song after 20 students first accompanied the band in the studio providing vocals on the chorus track. The same students received invitations to perform the song live onstage with Godsmack at a live show in Gilford, New Hampshire on August 22, 2018, at the Bank of New Hampshire Pavilion.

In 2019, the band proposed to the Gilbert H. Hood Middle School an enlistment of music students whom were trained and rehearsed with the band before the shoot to prepare for the music video filming.

During the band's visit, Sully personally spoke with and guided the students, sharing insights from his life and explained how music had saved him. Sully encouraged the young student musicians to continue the pursuit of their dreams.

The song remained on the Billboard charts for 31 weeks, peaking at #1 for over five.

== Critical reception ==
Professional ratings
Review scores
Source	Rating
AllMusic	3.5/5 stars
Blabbermouth.net	6/10 stars
Loudwire	Positive

AllMusic generally praised the album, describing the sound as "shedding some of the bitterness, anger, and aggression...without that violent anger and creeping darkness...what's left is a band that remains hungry and driven by hope" and concluded that album showed the band as "reinvigorated, confident, and no less defiant than they were in 1998. When Legends Rise is a slight shift, but a highly enjoyable one that stirs the soul in unexpected ways." Loudwire gave the album a positive ranking, stating that the album was "a turning point in their career".

== Track listing ==
No.	Title	Writer(s)	Length
1.	"When Legends Rise"	Sully Erna, John Feldmann	2:52
2.	"Bulletproof"	Erna, Erik Ron	2:57
3.	"Unforgettable"	Erna	3:28
4.	"Every Part of Me"	Erna, Feldmann	3:20
5.	"Take It to the Edge"	Erna, Ron	3:15
6.	"Under Your Scars"	Erna	3:51
7.	"Someday"	Erna	4:44
8.	"Just One Time"	Erna, Clint Lowery	3:09
9.	"Say My Name"	Erna	3:38
10.	"Let It Out"	Erna	3:41
11.	"Eye of the Storm"	Erna, Lowery, Ron	3:21
Total length:			38:16

== Personnel ==
Godsmack

- Sully Erna – lead vocals, guitars, piano, producer
- Tony Rombola – guitars, backing vocals
- Robbie Merrill – bass, backing vocals
- Shannon Larkin – drums

Additional musicians

- The Gilbert H. Hood and West Running Brook Choir – additional vocals on "Unforgettable"
- Zvezdelina Haltakova – violin on "Under Your Scars"
- Irina Chirkova – cello on "Under Your Scars"

Production and design

- Erik Ron – production, mixing
- Anthony Reeder – engineer
- Jerika Madnick – additional engineering
- Ted Jensen – mastering
- Troy Smith – photography
- John Feldmann – composition
- Clint Lowery – composition

== Charts ==
=== Weekly charts ===
Chart (2018)	Peak position
Australian Albums (ARIA)	55
Austrian Albums (Ö3 Austria)	12
Belgian Albums (Ultratop Flanders)	58
Belgian Albums (Ultratop Wallonia)	122
Canadian Albums (Billboard)	6
Dutch Albums (Album Top 100)	153
German Albums (Offizielle Top 100)	21
New Zealand Heatseeker Albums (RMNZ)	7
Scottish Albums (Official Charts)	54
Swiss Albums (Schweizer Hitparade)	28
UK Album Sales (OCC)	55
UK Digital Albums (OCC)	57
UK Rock & Metal Albums (OCC)	4
US Billboard 200	8
US Independent Albums (Billboard)	1
US Top Alternative Albums (Billboard)	1
US Top Hard Rock Albums (Billboard)	1
US Top Rock Albums (Billboard)	1

=== Year-end charts ===
Chart (2018)	Position
US Top Rock Albums (Billboard)	68

== Certifications ==
Region	Certification	Certified units/sales
United States (RIAA)	Gold	500,000^{‡}
^{‡} Sales+streaming figures based on certification alone.
