= Souls at Zero (band) =

American heavy metal band

- Also known as: Wrathchild America
- Origin: Martinsburg, West Virginia, U.S.
- Genres: Groove metal; thrash metal; alternative metal
- Years active: 1992–1996
- Labels: Energy Records
- Spinoff of: Wrathchild America
- Past members: Terry Carter; Shannon Larkin; Brad Divens; Jay Abbene; Jamie Miller; Rich Spillberg

Souls at Zero was an American heavy metal band. They were originally known as Wrathchild America. The name change occurred after Wrathchild America was dropped from Atlantic Records in 1992, and was accompanied by a slight change in musical style, adopting a mixture between alternative metal and groove metal (similar to those of Pantera and Helmet) while also retaining some of the thrash metal roots of Wrathchild America. Souls at Zero released three albums on Energy Records before disbanding in the mid-1990s.

== Name origin ==
The name "Souls at Zero" was taken from a chapter in the book The Great and Secret Show by horror writer Clive Barker. The name was originally intended for Shannon's and John "Tumor" Fahnestock's side project MF Pitbulls which also included 3/5 of the future band Snot.

== History ==
With the onset of grunge in the early 1990s, mainstream interest in metal was on the decline. Wrathchild America became a casualty of the grunge-era, being dropped from Atlantic Records. Changing their look and style, they became Souls at Zero. Shannon Larkin left the band in 1994 to fill the drum seat in Ugly Kid Joe; he currently plays in Godsmack. Jamie Miller replaced Larkin, and played on A Taste for the Perverse. He left to join Snot, and currently plays in TheSTART, ...And You Will Know Us by the Trail of Dead, Normandie and Bad Religion. After touring in support of A Taste for the Perverse, the band broke up.

== Band members ==
Former members

- Terry Carter – guitar, backing vocals (1992–1996)
- Shannon Larkin – drums, backing vocals (1992–1994)
- Brad Divens – bass, lead vocals (1992–1996)
- Jay Abbene – guitar, backing vocals (1992–1996)
- Jamie Miller – drums, backing vocals (1994–1996)
- Rich Spillberg – guitar, backing vocals (1995)

== Discography ==
=== Studio albums ===
- Souls at Zero (1993)
- A Taste for the Perverse (1995)

=== EPs ===
- Six-T-Six (1994)

== See also ==
- Wrathchild America
