= Wrathchild America =

American heavy metal band

- Also known as: Atlantis (1978); Tyrant (1978–1979); Wrathchild (1979–1988); Souls at Zero (1992–1996)
- Origin: Martinsburg, West Virginia, U.S.
- Genres: Thrash metal; heavy metal
- Years active: 1978–1996; 2016–2017
- Label: Atlantic
- Past members: Terry Carter; Shannon Larkin; Kevin Keller; Brad Divens; Jay Abbene; Ralph "Rat" Tillman; Max "Tuck" McDonald; Tracy "Mace" Peyton (Payton); Max Hykes; John Turner; Mike Combs; Chris Brinkman; Jamie Miller; Rich Spillberg

Wrathchild America was an American heavy metal band formed in Martinsburg, West Virginia, in 1978. Before settling on the Wrathchild America name in 1988, the band had performed under the names Atlantis, Tyrant, and Wrathchild. They released two studio albums through Atlantic Records, and gained charting success through the Billboard 200. In 1992, they changed their name to Souls at Zero. The band is also notable for including one-time Kix member Brad Divens, and a then-unknown Shannon Larkin, who went on to become the drummer for many bands such as Ugly Kid Joe, Candlebox, and Godsmack.

== History ==
Wrathchild was formed in 1978 by high school friends, Shannon Larkin, Kevin Keller, and Terry Carter. Keller met Carter after school in band class and was asked to join up with his friend Larkin. They had a band at the time named "Atlantis". Ralph "Rat" Tillman and Max "Tuck" McDonald soon joined and changed the name to Tyrant and then later to Wrathchild. Brad was recruited by Kevin Keller by throwing business cards at him while he was performing with his band Ratzalad. John Turner was soon hired from his band "The Shift". Wrathchild was a renowned live act in the mid to late 1980s all across the U.S. when they were known simply as Wrathchild. After years of touring, playing gigs, and hard work, the band finally was signed to a major label in 1988 thanks in large part to the dedicated work of Chip Seligman. However, despite having completed their debut album Climbin' the Walls in May of that year, a British glam metal band with the same name, Wrathchild, sued and forced the delay the album's release. The band amended their name by adding America, and Climbin' the Walls, finally released in August 1989, peaked at No. 190 on the Billboard 200. Their second album, 3-D (1991), coincided with the decline of the thrash metal scene and did not chart, although it did spawn two music videos that received regular airplay on MTV's Headbangers Ball ("Spy" and "Surrounded by Idiots"). During its existence, the band toured or played selected shows with such bands as Metallica, Slayer, Exodus, Testament, Annihilator, Pantera, Nuclear Assault, Armored Saint, Gang Green, Voivod, Vio-lence, Chris Poland and Dark Angel, among others. Around 1992, Wrathchild America was dropped from Atlantic Records, and changed its name to Souls at Zero and revamped its style and approach.

During the mid-2000s, former Toxik drummer Tad Leger had launched a brand new project called Lucertola (Italian for "lizard"). The group's musical style is said to be a blend of Leger's biggest influences: doom, old Voivod and Italian horror soundtracks (Goblin, Fabio Frizzi). Leger started out recording both guitar and drums himself, but was joined by his old Blackened Sky bandmate Andy Abbene and his brother Jay (Wrathchild America, Souls at Zero) in early December 2005.

Kevin Keller went on to perform with Salem with former members of Sabotage, formed his current band Vulgar Bullet in 2000. Terry Carter became involved in country music and is currently touring. Brad Divens has become an FOH sound engineer. Shannon Larkin was the drummer for Godsmack from 2002 to 2025.

By late 2016, rumors were circulating that Wrathchild America was planning to reunite for a series of shows and possibly new material. Frontman Brad Divens posted video clips of rehearsal videos on Facebook in mid-2017. By January 2021, however, no formal reunion of Wrathchild America had happened and there had been no updates on the current state of the band since 2017. In a June 2021 interview on the Somewhere in Time podcast, vocalist and bassist Brad Divens revealed that, during the band's near-reunion in 2017, plans were made to play at least one show at the reopening of the Hammerjack's club, but were ultimately scrapped because of scheduling conflicts, particularly including drummer Shannon Larkin's commitments with Godsmack. Divens also stated that all four members of the Climbin' the Walls lineup have not ruled out a proper reunion.

== Band members ==
Final lineup

- Terry Carter – guitar, backing and lead vocals, banjo (1978–1996, 2016–2017)
- Shannon Larkin – drums, backing and lead vocals (1978–1994, 2016–2017)
- Brad Divens – bass, lead and backing vocals, guitar (1983–1996, 2016–2017)
- Jay Abbene – guitar, backing vocals, mandolin (1984–1996, 2016–2017)

Former members

- Kevin Keller – bass, backing vocals, guitar (1978–1979)
- Ralph "Rat" Tillman – lead vocals (1979–1981)
- Max "Tuck" McDonald – bass (1979–1983), lead vocals (1981–1983)
- Tracy "Mace" Peyton (Payton) – guitar, backing vocals (1981–1982)
- Max Hykes – guitar, backing vocals (1982–1983)
- John Turner – guitar, backing vocals (1983–1984)
- Mike Combs – lead vocals
- Chris Brinkman – guitar, backing vocals
- Jamie Miller – drums, backing vocals (1994–1996)
- Rich Spillberg – guitar, backing vocals (1995)

== Discography ==
=== Demos ===
- Danger-Us (1983)
- Days of Thunder (1987)
- Demo '89 (1989)

=== Studio albums ===
- Climbin' the Walls (1989)
- 3-D (1991)
