= Crüe Fest 2 =

2009 concert tour by Mötley Crüe

Crüe Fest 2 was the second year of the Crüe Fest touring festival, created and headlined by Mötley Crüe. The tour took place over the summer of 2009, and was in the same vein as the first Crüe Fest.

== Line up ==
On March 16, 2009, the line up for Crüe Fest 2 was announced at a press conference at the Fuse TV studio in New York City. The bands were confirmed to be Charm City Devils, Drowning Pool, Godsmack, and Theory of a Deadman, in addition to Mötley Crüe themselves.

Nikki Sixx said of the line up, "This is what we imagined when we came up with the idea of Crüe Fest last summer – putting together the most kick ass bands on one bill for a day of rock. All of the bands on this tour compliment [sic] the others -- musically, theatrically and passionately."

Mötley Crüe announced that they would play the entire Dr. Feelgood album every night of Crüe Fest 2, to celebrate the album's 20th anniversary.

== Second stage ==
A second stage was added to the festival through a partnership with Monster Energy. The second stage had five additional bands performing, with one of these being a local band picked by a local radio station. The local band opened the Monster Energy Stage of Crüe Fest 2. Cavo, Rev Theory, 16 Second Stare, and Shram were confirmed to be appearing on the second stage.

== Tour dates ==
Date	City	Country	Venue
July 19, 2009	Camden	United States	Susquehanna Bank Center
July 21, 2009	Cuyahoga Falls	United States	Blossom Music Center
July 22, 2009	Tinley Park	United States	First Midwest Bank Amphitheatre
July 24, 2009	Minot	United States	North Dakota State Fair
July 27, 2009	Auburn	United States	White River Amphitheatre
July 28, 2009	Ridgefield	United States	The Amphitheater at Clark County
July 30, 2009	Mountain View	United States	Shoreline Amphitheatre
July 31, 2009	San Bernardino	United States	San Manuel Amphitheater
August 1, 2009	Paradise	United States	The Joint
August 3, 2009	West Valley City	United States	USANA Amphitheatre
August 4, 2009	Greenwood Village	United States	Fiddler's Green Amphitheatre
August 5, 2009	Albuquerque	United States	Journal Pavilion
August 7, 2009	The Woodlands	United States	Cynthia Woods Mitchell Pavilion
August 8, 2009	Dallas	United States	Superpages.com Center
August 9, 2009	Kansas City	United States	Sprint Center
August 11, 2009	Maryland Heights	United States	Verizon Wireless Amphitheater
August 12, 2009	Noblesville	United States	Verizon Wireless Amphitheater
August 14, 2009	Cincinnati	United States	Riverbend Music Center
August 15, 2009	Clarkston	United States	DTE Energy Music Theatre
August 16, 2009	Burgettstown	United States	Post-Gazette Pavilion
August 18, 2009	Holmdel	United States	PNC Bank Arts Center
August 19, 2009	Mansfield	United States	Comcast Center
August 21, 2009	Virginia Beach	United States	Verizon Wireless Virginia Beach Amphitheater
August 22, 2009	Bristow	United States	Nissan Pavilion
August 23, 2009	Raleigh	United States	Time Warner Music Pavilion at Walnut Creek
August 27, 2009	West Palm Beach	United States	Cruzan Amphitheatre
August 28, 2009	Tampa	United States	Ford Amphitheatre
August 29, 2009	Atlanta	United States	Lakewood Amphitheatre
August 30, 2009	Charlotte	United States	Verizon Wireless Amphitheatre
September 1, 2009	Saratoga Springs	United States	Saratoga Performing Arts Center
September 3, 2009	Syracuse	United States	Great New York State Fair
September 4, 2009	Scranton	United States	Toyota Pavilion
September 5, 2009	Corfu	United States	Darien Lake Performing Arts Center
