= Dropbox (band) =

American rock band

- Origin: New York City, U.S.
- Genres: Post-grunge; alternative metal; hard rock; alternative rock
- Years active: 2002–2007
- Labels: Universal, Realign
- Past members: John Kosco; Joey Wilkinson; Lee Richards; Jim Preziosa; Bob Jenkins; Cameron Rozell

Dropbox was a five-piece American rock band formed in 2002 in New York City. Their debut album, Dropbox, was released on the Universal Records label with the help of Sully Erna.

== History ==
The band's eponymously-titled 2004 album charted at number 182 on the Billboard 200 chart. It had a minor hit song in "Wishbone" which received air time on MTV2 and Fuse, was featured in TV commercials, and peaked at number 23 on the Billboard Mainstream Rock Chart. Dropbox also featured on the Godsmack acoustic release, "Touché", which peaked at number 7 on the same chart.

In 2008 Hit Parader magazine named the group as one of the top 100 hard rock bands of the 21st century.

=== Post-Dropbox ===
After the demise of Dropbox, Kosco and Joe Wilkinson formed a new group with bassist John Freeman and drummer Chris Hamilton, formerly of Bloodsimple, called Saint Caine. Lee Richards went on to join his former Godsmack bandmates in Another Animal as a second guitarist.

== Discography ==
- Dropbox (2004)
