= Shannon Larkin =

American drummer (born 1967)

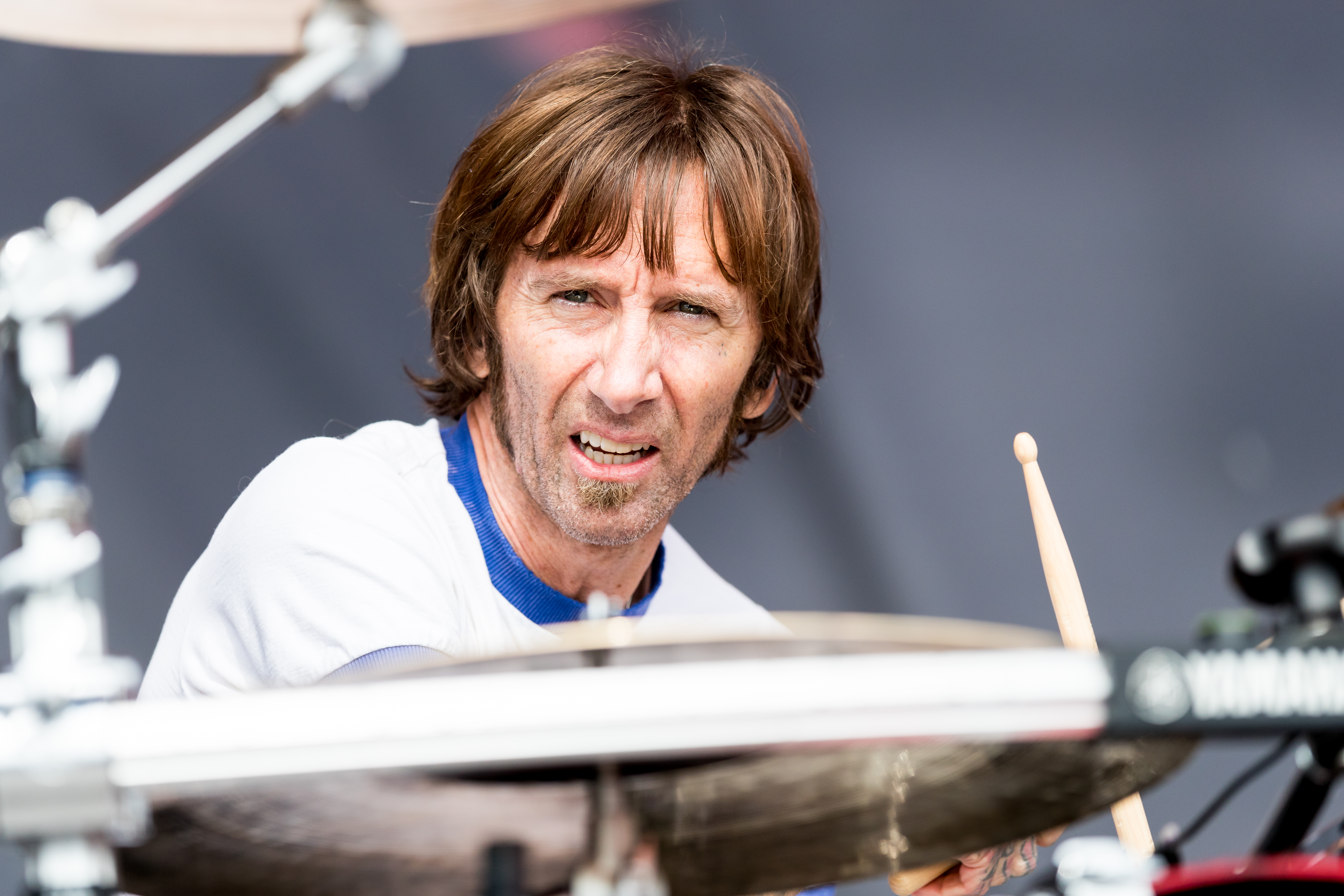
- Larkin performing with Godsmack in 2019

Background information
- Born: James Shannon Larkin; April 24, 1967 (age 59); Chicago, Illinois, U.S.
- Genres: Heavy metal; alternative metal; hard rock; post-grunge; hardcore punk; alternative rock; nu metal; blues rock; psychedelic rock
- Occupations: Musician; songwriter
- Instrument: Drums
- Years active: 1978–present
- Formerly of: Godsmack; Another Animal; The Apocalypse Blues Revival; Candlebox; Ugly Kid Joe; Amen; Souls at Zero; Wrathchild America

James Shannon Larkin (born April 24, 1967) is an American musician, best known as the former drummer of the rock band Godsmack. He replaced the band's previous drummer Tommy Stewart in June 2002, and played on six of their studio albums: Faceless (2003), IV (2006), The Oracle (2010), 1000hp (2014), When Legends Rise (2018), and Lighting Up the Sky (2023). At the time of his departure from the band in late 2024, Larkin was Godsmack's longest-serving drummer.

Prior to Godsmack, Larkin was a member of Amen, Candlebox, Ugly Kid Joe, and Souls at Zero (formerly Wrathchild America).

== Career ==
Larkin has been playing drums since the age of ten.

He formed Wrathchild America in 1978, recording two albums for Atlantic Records before being dropped by the label. The group disbanded and later reformed as Souls at Zero, signing with Energy Rekords and releasing an eponymous debut album that was well received by critics. He went on to join Ugly Kid Joe in 1994 replacing their touring drummer who replaced its drummer Mark Davis, recording two albums with the band before its breakup in 1997 and spent a decade with the band following its reform in 2010, recording another two albums before leaving the band in 2021. He recorded two more with Amen before joining Godsmack.

He briefly played with Black Sabbath at one show on July 1, 1997, when regular drummer Mike Bordin was unavailable.

He joined Godsmack in 2002, replacing departing drummer Tommy Stewart. He played on six of their studio albums, Faceless (2003), IV (2006), The Oracle (2010), 1000hp (2014), When Legends Rise (2018), and Lighting Up the Sky (2023), as well as the acoustic EP The Other Side (2004). It was announced on April 2, 2025 that Larkin (along with guitarist Tony Rombola) had left Godsmack.

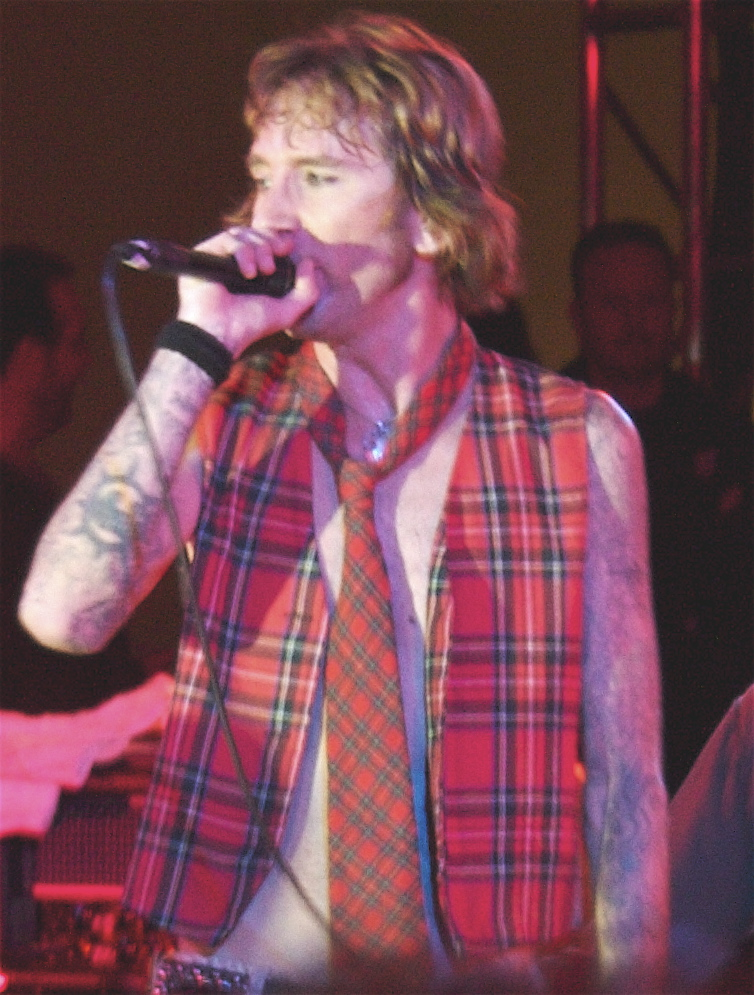
Larkin at a Sabian live show in 2008

His numerous side projects have included hardcore punk and thrash metal band Kiddie Porn with fellow Wrathchild guitarist Jay Abbene and bassist John "Tumor" Fahnestock, MF Pitbulls with members of Snot, and The Apocalypse Blues Revival with Tony Rombola.

He has appeared as a session musician on such albums as Strait Up by Snot and Glenn Tipton's Baptizm of Fire. He has played for Vanilla Ice, Glassjaw, and Stone Sour.

He was featured on the Behind the Player series.

== Personal life ==
Larkin is a koi and turtle enthusiast and keeps multiple koi and turtles at his home. Larkin has been tattooed by artists all over the world. In addition to a full sleeve on his left arm and tattoos on his right arm, he has "Amen" tattooed across his knuckles and a hand ripping into the skin on his stomach.

== Discography ==
=== Wrathchild America ===
- Climbin' the Walls (1989)
- 3-D (1991)

=== Souls at Zero ===
- Souls at Zero (1993)
- Six-T-Six EP (1994)

=== Ugly Kid Joe ===
- Menace to Sobriety (1995)
- Motel California (1996)
- The Very Best of Ugly Kid Joe: As Ugly as It Gets (1998)
- Stairway to Hell (2012)
- Uglier Than They Used ta Be (2015)
- Rad Wings of Destiny (2022)

=== Glen Tipton ===
- Baptizm of Fire (1997)

=== Amen ===
- Amen (1999)
- We Have Come for Your Parents (2001)
- Death Before Musick (2004)

=== Snot ===
- Strait Up (2000)

=== Godsmack ===
- Faceless (2003)
- The Other Side (2004)
- IV (2006)
- Good Times, Bad Times.... 10 Years of Godsmack (2007)
- The Oracle (2010)
- 1000hp (2014)
- When Legends Rise (2018)
- Lighting Up the Sky (2023)

=== Another Animal ===
- Another Animal (2007)

=== As session musician ===
- "30/30-150" by Stone Sour (2006)
- Hard to Swallow by Vanilla Ice (1998)
- Worship and Tribute by Glassjaw (2002)
- Massive Grooves... by Poundhound (a.k.a. Doug Pinnick of King's X) (1998)

=== The Apocalypse Blues Revival ===
- The Apocalypse Blues Revue (2016)
- The Shape of Blues to Come (2018)
