= Black Sabbath discography =

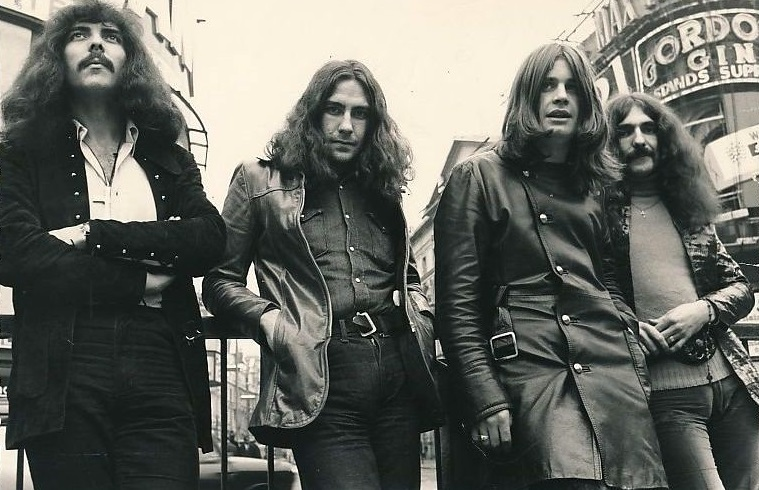
- Studio albums: 19
- Extended plays: 3
- Live albums: 8
- Compilation albums: 14
- Singles: 37
- Video albums: 9
- Music videos: 20
- Box sets: 13

The discography of Black Sabbath, an English heavy metal band, includes 19 studio albums, eight live albums, 14 compilation albums, three extended plays, 37 singles, nine video albums and 20 music videos. The band was formed in 1968 by John "Ozzy" Osbourne (vocals), Tony Iommi (guitars), Terence "Geezer" Butler (bass guitar), and Bill Ward (drums). The band has undergone multiple lineup changes. Though the second most recent line-up of the band to work together were Ronnie James Dio, Vinny Appice, Iommi, and Butler, for three new songs for a compilation in 2007, the original line-up was still considered the "current" lineup at the time and had been since their reunion in 1997. The 2007 sessions were deemed a one-off which led to the Heaven & Hell side project, resulting in a new studio album in 2009 titled The Devil You Know. In June 2013, a partial reformation of the original line-up released 13, which was the first album to feature Osbourne on vocals since 1978's Never Say Die!. To conclude their farewell tour, Black Sabbath played their last concert for eight years in their home city in 2017. Occasional partial reunions then occurred, most notably when Osbourne and Iommi performed at the closing ceremony of the 2022 Commonwealth Games in Birmingham. The original line-up reunited for a final show for both the band and Osbourne as a solo artist, titled Back to the Beginning, at Villa Park on 5 July 2025; Osbourne died seventeen days after the performance.

== Albums ==
=== Studio albums ===
Title	Album details	Peak chart positions										Certifications
Title	Album details	UK	AUS	CAN	FIN	GER	NL	NOR	SWE	SWI	US	Certifications
Black Sabbath	Released: 13 February 1970; Label: Vertigo, Warner Bros.; Formats: LP, MC, 4-track, 8-track, reel-to-reel	8	8	29	13	8	6	—	—	—	23	BPI: Gold; MC: Gold; RIAA: Platinum
Paranoid	Released: 18 September 1970; Label: Vertigo, Warner Bros.; Formats: LP, MC, 8-track, reel-to-reel	1	4	20	4	2	1	5	6	46 (Note: Chart peak in 2025.)	12	BPI: Platinum; ARIA: Gold; BVMI: Gold; MC: Platinum; RIAA: 4× Platinum
Master of Reality	Released: 6 August 1971; Label: Vertigo, Warner Bros.; Formats: LP, MC, 8-track, reel-to-reel	5	8	6	3	5	10	12	8	—	8	BPI: Gold; MC: Platinum; RIAA: 2× Platinum
Vol. 4	Released: 22 September 1972; Label: Vertigo, Warner Bros.; Formats: LP, MC, 8-track, reel-to-reel	8	1	5	2	8	—	7	7	17 (Note: Chart peak in 2021.)	13	BPI: Gold; MC: Platinum; RIAA: Platinum
Sabbath Bloody Sabbath	Released: 30 November 1973; Label: Vertigo, WWA, Warner Bros.; Formats: LP, MC, 8-track, reel-to-reel	4	5	17	25	13	—	6	9	71	11	BPI: Gold; MC: Gold; RIAA: Platinum
Sabotage	Released: 28 July 1975; Label: NEMS, Warner Bros.; Formats: LP, MC, 8-track	7	1	33	—	17	—	6	11	25	28	BPI: Silver; RIAA: Gold
Technical Ecstasy	Released: 8 October 1976; Label: Vertigo, Warner Bros.; Formats: LP, MC, 8-track	13	—	38	—	27	—	—	33	81	51	BPI: Silver; RIAA: Gold
Never Say Die!	Released: 29 September 1978; Label: Vertigo, Warner Bros.; Formats: LP, MC, 8-track	12	—	90	—	—	—	—	37	—	69	RIAA: Gold
Heaven and Hell	Released: 18 April 1980; Label: Vertigo, Warner Bros.; Formats: LP, MC, 8-track	9	—	23	—	37	—	22	25	—	28	BPI: Gold; MC: Gold; RIAA: Platinum
Mob Rules	Released: 4 November 1981; Label: Vertigo, Warner Bros.; Formats: LP, MC, 8-track	12	—	19	18	83 (Note: Chart peak in 2022.)	47	—	30	—	29	BPI: Gold; MC: Gold; RIAA: Gold
Born Again	Released: 12 September 1983; Label: Vertigo, Warner Bros.; Formats: LP, MC, 8-track	4	53	37	6	37	—	14	7	—	39	BPI: Gold
Seventh Star	Released: 20 January 1986; Label: Vertigo, Warner Bros.; Formats: CD, LP, MC	27	88	66	10	51	—	17	11	—	78	
The Eternal Idol	Released: November 1987; Label: Vertigo, Warner Bros.; Formats: CD, LP, MC	66	—	86	25	—	—	—	—	—	168	
Headless Cross	Released: 17 April 1989; Label: I.R.S.; Formats: CD, LP, MC	31	132	—	28	18	71	—	22	23	115	
Tyr	Released: 20 August 1990; Label: I.R.S.; Formats: CD, LP, MC	24	143	—	15	12	77	—	24	24	—	
Dehumanizer	Released: 22 June 1992; Label: I.R.S.; Formats: CD, LP, MC	28	65	36	12	14	63	—	12	13	44	
Cross Purposes	Released: 31 January 1994; Label: I.R.S.; Formats: CD, LP, MC	41	173	—	9	32	85	—	9	41	122	
Forbidden	Released: 5 June 1995; Label: I.R.S.; Formats: CD, LP, MC	71	154	—	12	35	86	—	19	48	—	
13	Released: 10 June 2013; Label: Vertigo; Formats: CD, 2×CD, 2×LP, digital download	1	4	1	2	1	10	1	1	1	1	BPI: Gold; BVMI: Platinum; MC: Platinum
"—" denotes releases that did not chart or were not released in that territory.

=== Live albums ===
Title	Album details	Peak chart positions										Certifications
Title	Album details	UK	CAN	FIN	FRA	GER	NL	NOR	SWE	SWI	US	Certifications
Live at Last	Released: June 1980; Label: NEMS; Formats: LP, MC	5	—	—	—	—	—	—	26	—	—	
Live Evil	Released: January 1983; Label: Vertigo, Warner Bros.; Formats: 2×LP, MC	13	22	10	—	37	34	—	15	91	37	
Cross Purposes Live	Released: 13 March 1995; Label: I.R.S.; Formats: CD+VHS	—	—	—	—	—	—	—	—	—	—	
Reunion	Released: 19 October 1998; Label: Epic; Formats: 2×CD, 2×MC, 2×MD	41	6	29	65	32	—	—	11	84	11	BPI: Silver; MC: Platinum; RIAA: Platinum
Past Lives	Released: 20 August 2002; Label: Sanctuary; Formats: 2×CD	—	—	—	—	—	—	—	—	—	114	
Live at Hammersmith Odeon	Released: 1 May 2007; Label: Rhino Handmade; Formats: CD	—	—	—	—	—	—	—	—	—	—	
Live... Gathered in Their Masses	Released: 26 November 2013; Label: Universal, Republic; Formats: CD+DVD, CD+Blu-ray	—	—	—	173	11	—	—	—	92	—	
The End: Live in Birmingham	Released: 17 November 2017; Label: Eagle/Universal; Formats: 2×CD, 3×LP, digital download	68	—	11	153	2	79	20	18	14	—	
"—" denotes releases that did not chart or were not released in that territory.

=== Compilation albums ===
Title	Album details	Peak chart positions										Certifications
Title	Album details	UK	AUS	CAN	FIN	GER	NOR	NZ	SWE	SWI	US	Certifications
We Sold Our Soul for Rock 'n' Roll	Released: January 1976; Label: NEMS, Vertigo; Formats: 2×LP, MC, 8-track	35	—	40	—	—	—	—	21	—	48	BPI: Gold; RIAA: 2× Platinum
Greatest Hits	Released: December 1977; Label: NEMS; Formats: LP, MC	—	—	—	—	—	—	—	—	—	—	
The Sabbath Collection	Released: 1 November 1985; Label: Castle Communications; Formats: CD, 2×LP, 2×MC	—	—	—	—	—	—	—	—	—	—	BPI: Gold
Backtrackin' – 20th Anniversary Edition	Released: 1989; Label: Masterpiece Music; Formats: CD, 2×LP, 2×MC	—	62 (Note: Chart peak in 1991.)	—	—	—	—	5	—	—	—	
The Ultimate in Heavy Metal	Released: September 1992; Label: PMI Entertainment; Formats: CD; Split with Judas Priest	—	—	—	—	—	—	45	—	—	—	
The Sabbath Stones	Released: 29 April 1996; Label: I.R.S.; Formats: CD, MC	—	—	—	—	—	—	—	—	—	—	
The Best of Black Sabbath	Released: 5 June 2000; Label: Castle Communications/Sanctuary; Formats: 2×CD, 4×LP, 2×MC	24	41	—	13	—	6	38	12	—	—	BPI: Gold; ARIA: Platinum
Symptom of the Universe: The Original Black Sabbath 1970–1978	Released: 22 October 2002; Label: Rhino/Warner Bros.; Formats: 2×CD	—	—	—	—	—	—	—	—	—	—	
Greatest Hits 1970–1978	Released: 14 March 2006; Label: Rhino/Warner Bros.; Formats: CD	—	—	31	—	—	—	6	—	—	96	
Black Sabbath: The Dio Years	Released: 3 April 2007; Label: Rhino/Warner Bros.; Formats: CD, 2×CD	151	179	—	—	—	35	—	32	—	54	
Greatest Hits	Released: 15 June 2009; Label: Sanctuary/Universal Music TV; Formats: CD	19	—	—	—	—	—	12	3	—	—	BPI: Gold; RMNZ: Platinum
Iron Man: The Best of Black Sabbath	Released: 4 June 2012; Label: Sanctuary/Universal; Formats: CD	27	—	—	—	—	—	—	—	—	—	
The Ultimate Collection	Released: 28 October 2016; Label: BMG; Formats: 2×CD, 4×LP, digital download	14	113	—	—	40	—	—	—	52	—	BPI: Gold
The Legendary Lost Tapes (as Earth)	Released: TBC; Label: Big Bear Records; Formats: CD, LP, digital download	—	—	—	—	—	—	—	—	—	—	
"—" denotes releases that did not chart or were not released in that territory.

=== Box sets ===
Title	Album details	Peak chart positions	
Title	Album details	GER	SWE
The CD Collection	Released: 1988; Label: Castle Communications; Formats: 6×CD	—	—
The Ozzy Osbourne Years	Released: 2 April 1991; Label: Castle Communications; Formats: 3×CD, 5×LP	—	—
Cross Box	Released: 1994; Label: Castle Communications; Formats: 6×CD	—	—
Under Wheels of Confusion 1970–1987	Released: 2 December 1996; Label: Castle Communications; Formats: 4×CD	—	—
The Singles 1970–1978	Released: 2000; Label: Sanctuary; Formats: 6×CDS	—	—
The Complete 70's Replica CD Collection	Released: October 2001; Label: Castle Music; Formats: 8×CD	—	—
Black Box: The Complete Original Black Sabbath 1970–1978	Released: 27 April 2004; Label: Rhino/Warner Bros.; Formats: 8×CD+DVD	—	—
The Rules of Hell	Released: 22 July 2008; Label: Rhino; Formats: 6×CD	—	—
The Complete Ozzy Years 1970–1978	Released: 15 November 2010; Label: Sanctuary/Universal; Formats: 13×CD	—	—
The Vinyl Collection 1970–1978	Released: 12 December 2012; Label: Sanctuary/Universal; Formats: 9×LP+7"	—	—
The Complete Albums 1970–1978	Released: 9 August 2014; Label: Rhino/Warner Bros.; Formats: 8×CD, digital download	—	—
The Ten Year War	Released: 27 October 2017; Label: BMG; Formats: 8×LP+2×7", digital download	60	45
Supersonic Years: The Seventies Singles Box Set	Released: 8 June 2018; Label: BMG; Formats: 10×7"	23	—
Anno Domini 1989–1995	Released: 31 May 2024; Label: BMG / Rhino (North America); Formats: 4×CD, 4×LP	9	43
"—" denotes releases that did not chart or were not released in that territory.

== EPs ==
Title	Album details
Archive 4	Released: 16 June 1986; Label: Castle Communications; Formats: 12"
Black Mass	Released: 1999; Label: New Millennium Communications; Formats: CD
The End	Released: 20 January 2016; Label: BS Productions Limited; Formats: CD

== Singles ==
Title	Year	Peak chart positions										Certifications	Album
Title	Year	UK	AUS	AUT	CAN	GER	IRE	NL	SWI	US	US Main	Certifications	Album
"Evil Woman"	1970	—	—	—	—	—	—	—	—	—	—		Black Sabbath
"The Wizard" (Note: "The Wizard" was only released as a single in France.)	1970	—	—	—	—	—	—	—	—	—	—		Black Sabbath
"Paranoid"	1970	4	26	3	54	1	12	2	2	61	—	BPI: Platinum; BVMI: Gold; RMNZ: 5× Platinum	Paranoid
"Wicked World" (Note: "Wicked World" was only released as a single in Japan.)	1971	—	—	—	—	—	—	—	—	—	—		Non-album single
"Children of the Grave" (Note: "Children of the Grave" was only released as a single in Portugal and Mexico.)	1971	—	—	—	—	—	—	—	—	—	—		Master of Reality
"Iron Man" (Note: "Iron Man" was only released as a single in the US and Canada.)	1971	48 (Note: "Iron Man" charted in 2025 following Osbourne's death.)	—	—	68	—	—	—	—	52	—	BPI: Platinum; RMNZ: Platinum	Paranoid
"Tomorrow's Dream"	1972	—	—	—	—	—	—	—	—	—	—		Vol. 4
"Sabbath Bloody Sabbath"	1973	—	—	—	—	—	—	—	—	—	—		Sabbath Bloody Sabbath
"Am I Going Insane (Radio)"	1976	—	—	—	—	—	—	—	—	—	—		Sabotage
"It's Alright"	1976	—	—	—	—	—	—	—	—	—	—		Technical Ecstasy
"Gypsy" (Note: "Gypsy" was only released as a single in the Netherlands and Yugoslavia.)	1977	—	—	—	—	—	—	—	—	—	—		Technical Ecstasy
"Never Say Die"	1978	21	—	—	—	—	18	—	—	—	—		Never Say Die!
"Hard Road"	1978	33	—	—	—	—	—	—	—	—	—		Never Say Die!
"Neon Knights"	1980	22	—	—	—	—	20	—	—	—	—		Heaven and Hell
"Paranoid" (reissue)	1980	14	—	—	—	—	20	—	—	—	—		Non-album single
"Lady Evil" (Note: "Lady Evil" was only released as a single in the US and Canada.)	1980	—	—	—	—	—	—	—	—	—	—		Heaven and Hell
"Die Young"	1980	41	—	—	—	—	—	—	—	—	—		Heaven and Hell
"Mob Rules"	1981	46	—	—	—	—	—	—	—	—	—		Mob Rules
"Voodoo" (airplay)	1981	—	—	—	—	—	—	—	—	—	46		Mob Rules
"Turn Up the Night"	1982	37	—	—	—	—	—	—	—	—	24		Mob Rules
"Trashed" (Note: "Trashed" was only released as a single in the US and Canada.)	1983	—	—	—	—	—	—	—	—	—	—		Born Again
"No Stranger to Love" (Note: "No Stranger to Love" was only released as a single in a few EU markets.)	1986	—	—	—	—	—	—	—	—	—	—		Seventh Star
"The Shining" (Note: "The Shining" was only released as a single in the Netherlands.)	1987	—	—	—	—	—	—	—	—	—	—		The Eternal Idol
"Headless Cross"	1989	62	—	—	—	—	—	—	—	—	—		Headless Cross
"Devil and Daughter"	1989	81	—	—	—	—	—	—	—	—	—		Headless Cross
"Call of the Wild" (Note: "Call of the Wild" was only released as a single in Continental Europe.)	1989	—	—	—	—	—	—	—	—	—	—		Headless Cross
"Feels Good to Me"	1990	79	—	—	—	—	—	—	—	—	—		Tyr
"TV Crimes"	1992	33	152	—	—	—	—	—	—	—	—		Dehumanizer
"Master of Insanity" (Note: "Master of Insanity" was only released as a single in Continental Europe.)	1992	—	—	—	—	—	—	—	—	—	—		Dehumanizer
"Psycho Man" (Note: "Psycho Man" was only released as a single in Europe.)	1998	—	—	—	24	—	—	—	—	—	3		Reunion
"Paranoid" (live) (Note: "Paranoid" was only released as a single in Continental Europe.)	1998	—	—	—	—	—	—	—	—	—	—		Reunion
"Selling My Soul" (promo) (Note: "Selling My Soul" was only released as a promotional single in the US.)	1999	—	—	—	—	—	—	—	—	—	17		Reunion
"The Devil Cried" (airplay)	2007	—	—	—	—	—	—	—	—	—	37		The Dio Years
"God Is Dead?"	2013	145	133	—	—	99	—	—	—	—	7		13
"End of the Beginning" (promo)	2013	—	—	—	—	—	—	—	—	—	38		13
"Loner"	2013	—	—	—	—	—	—	—	—	—	—		13
"Age of Reason"	2014	—	—	—	—	—	—	—	—	—	—		13
"—" denotes releases that did not chart or were not released in that territory.

== Other charted songs ==
Title	Year	Peak chart positions	Certifications	Album
Title	Year	UK	Certifications	Album
"N.I.B."	1970	—	RMNZ: Gold	Black Sabbath
"War Pigs"	2025	47	RMNZ: 2× Platinum	Paranoid

== Videography ==
=== Video albums ===
Title	Album details	Peak chart positions							Certifications
Title	Album details	AUT	BEL	FIN	NL	SWE	SWI	US	Certifications
Never Say Die	Released: 1980; Label: VCL Video; Formats: VHS, Beta	—	—	—	—	—	—	—	
Black and Blue	Released: 1981; Label: PolyGram Video/Spectrum; Formats: VHS; Split with Blue Öyster Cult	—	—	—	—	—	—	—	
The Black Sabbath Story, Vol. 1	Released: 1991; Label: Castle Music Pictures; Formats: VHS, LD	—	—	—	—	1	—	8	ARIA: Gold; MC: Gold; RIAA: Platinum
The Black Sabbath Story, Vol. 2	Released: 1992; Label: Castle Music; Formats: VHS, LD	—	—	—	—	5	—	16	RIAA: Gold
Cross Purposes Live	Released: 13 March 1995; Label: I.R.S.; Formats: CD+VHS	—	—	—	—	—	—	—	
The Last Supper	Released: 1 November 1999; Label: SMV Enterprises, Epic; Formats: VHS, DVD	—	—	—	—	11	—	8	BPI: Gold
Classic Albums: Paranoid	Released: May 2010; Label: Eagle Vision; Formats: DVD, Blu-ray	—	—	—	—	—	—	—	
Live... Gathered in Their Masses	Released: 26 November 2013; Label: Universal, Republic; Formats: DVD, Blu-ray	4	5	1	16	1	4	—	MC: Platinum
The End: Live in Birmingham	Released: 17 November 2017; Label: Eagle/Universal; Formats: DVD, Blu-ray	—	—	—	—	—	—	—	
"—" denotes releases that did not chart or were not released in that territory.

=== Music videos ===
Year	Title	Album
1970	"Black Sabbath"	Black Sabbath
1970	"Iron Man"	Paranoid
1970	"Paranoid"	Paranoid
1973	"Sabbath Bloody Sabbath"	Sabbath Bloody Sabbath
1976	"It's Alright"	Technical Ecstasy
1976	"Rock 'n' Roll Doctor"	Technical Ecstasy
1978	"A Hard Road"	Never Say Die!
1980	"Neon Knights"	Heaven and Hell
1980	"Die Young"	Heaven and Hell
1983	"Trashed"	Born Again
1983	"Zero the Hero"	Born Again
1986	"No Stranger to Love"	Seventh Star
1987	"The Shining"	The Eternal Idol
1989	"Headless Cross"	Headless Cross
1990	"Feels Good to Me"	Tyr
1992	"TV Crimes"	Dehumanizer
1994	"The Hand That Rocks the Cradle"	Cross Purposes
1995	"Get a Grip"	Forbidden
2013	"God Is Dead?"	13
2013	"End of the Beginning"	13

== Other releases ==
- 1981 – Heavy Metal (soundtrack) (Contains alternate take of "The Mob Rules")
- 1992 – Wayne's World: Music from the Motion Picture (Contains alternate take of "Time Machine")

== See also ==
- Heaven & Hell discography
