= The Sabbath Stones =

Compilation album by Black Sabbath
- Released: 29 April 1996
- Recorded: 1983–95
- Genre: Heavy metal
- Length: 79:59
- Label: I.R.S.
- Producer: Various (see below)

Black Sabbath chronology
Forbidden (1995)	The Sabbath Stones (1996)	Under Wheels of Confusion (1996)

The Sabbath Stones is a compilation album by the English heavy metal band Black Sabbath, released on 29 April 1996, through I.R.S. Records as a European exclusive. The recording mostly features songs taken from the Tony Martin era of the band, while also featuring tracks from Born Again, Seventh Star, and Dehumanizer. It was the final album to be released by Black Sabbath under the I.R.S. label.

== Album information ==
The album was created solely to fulfill Black Sabbath's contract with I.R.S. It included a short story about Black Sabbath which had some mistakes, including the misspelling of Vinny Appice's name on the front cover of the CD as "Vinnie", a mistake which also appeared on both the Mob Rules and Live Evil sleeves.

This compilation features at least one song from each of the eight Black Sabbath albums released from 1983 until 1995. This period covers all five studio albums released by the band with lead singer Tony Martin, one studio album with lead singer Ian Gillan, one with Glenn Hughes and one with Ronnie James Dio.

The version of "Headless Cross" that appears on this album starts with the last few seconds of the track "The Gates of Hell" (Which precedes "Headless Cross" on the Headless Cross album) before the opening drum line.

"Loser Gets It All", according to the liner notes in the album, was supposedly one of Tony Iommi's favorite tracks to both perform and write. It was recorded during the Forbidden sessions, but only appeared on the Japanese version of the album.

Professional ratings
Review scores
Source	Rating
Allmusic	3/5 stars

== Track listing ==
No.	Title	Writer(s)	Original release	Length
1.	"Headless Cross"	Tony Iommi; Cozy Powell; Tony Martin	Headless Cross (1989)	6:32
2.	"When Death Calls"	Iommi; Powell; Geoff Nicholls; Martin; Brian May	Headless Cross	6:57
3.	"Devil & Daughter"	Iommi; Powell; Martin	Headless Cross	4:43
4.	"The Sabbath Stones"	Iommi; Powell; Nicholls; Martin; Neil Murray	Tyr (1990)	6:48
5.	"The Battle of Tyr" (Instrumental)	Iommi; Powell; Nicholls; Murray	Tyr	1:08
6.	"Odin's Court"	Iommi; Powell; Nicholls; Martin; Murray	Tyr	2:42
7.	"Valhalla"	Iommi; Powell; Nicholls; Martin; Murray	Tyr	4:41
8.	"TV Crimes"	Ronnie James Dio; Iommi; Geezer Butler	Dehumanizer (1992)	4:01
9.	"Virtual Death"	Iommi; Butler; Martin	Cross Purposes (1994)	5:46
10.	"Evil Eye"	Iommi; Butler; Martin; Eddie Van Halen	Cross Purposes	5:57
11.	"Kiss of Death"	Iommi; Powell; Nicholls; Martin; Murray	Forbidden (1995)	6:09
12.	"Guilty as Hell"	Iommi; Powell; Nicholls; Martin; Murray	Forbidden	3:30
13.	"Loser Gets It All"	Iommi; Powell; Nicholls; Martin; Murray	Japanese issue of Forbidden	2:57
14.	"Disturbing the Priest"	Iommi; Butler; Bill Ward; Ian Gillan	Born Again (1983)	5:49
15.	"Heart Like a Wheel"	Iommi; Glenn Hughes; Nicholls; Jeff Glixman	Seventh Star (1986)	6:37
16.	"The Shining"	Iommi; Bob Daisley; Ray Gillen	The Eternal Idol (1987)	5:55

== Personnel ==
- Tony Iommi – guitars - all tracks
- Geoff Nicholls – keyboards - all tracks
- Tony Martin – lead vocals - Tracks 1–4, 6–7, 9–13, 16
- Cozy Powell – drums - Tracks 1–7, 11–13
- Neil Murray – bass - Tracks 4–7, 11–13, 16
- Geezer Butler – bass - Tracks 8–10, 14
- Bobby Rondinelli – drums - tracks 9–10
- Eric Singer – drums - tracks 15–16
- Ronnie James Dio – lead vocals - track 8
- Vinny Appice – drums - track 8
- Bill Ward – drums - track 14
- Ian Gillan – lead vocals - track 14
- Glenn Hughes – lead vocals - track 15
- Dave Spitz – bass - track 15

=== Guest musicians ===
- Laurence Cottle – bass - tracks 1–3
- Brian May – guitar solo - track 2
- Bob Daisley – bass - track 16

== Producers ==
- Tony Iommi, Cozy Powell – Tracks 1–7
- Mack for Musicland GmbH – track 8
- Leif Mases/Black Sabbath – tracks 9–10
- Ernie C. – tracks 11–13
- Robin Black – track 14
- Jeff Glixman, Chris Tsangerides – track 15
- Jeff Glixman, V. Cooper – track 16

== See also ==
- The Sabbath Stones - Tony Iommi Official Website
