= Geoff Nicholls =

British guitarist and keyboardist (1944–2017)

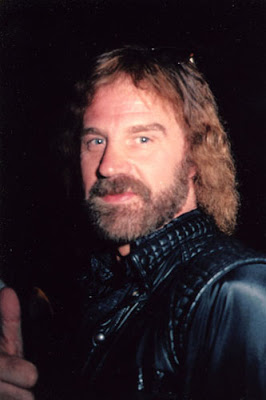

Background information
- Born: Geoffrey James Nicholls; 29 February 1944; Birmingham, England
- Died: 28 January 2017 (aged 72)
- Genres: Psychedelic pop; heavy metal
- Occupation: Musician
- Instruments: Keyboards; guitar
- Formerly of: Black Sabbath; Quartz; Johnny Neal and the Starliners; World of Oz

Geoffrey James Nicholls (29 February 1944 – 28 January 2017) was an English guitarist and keyboardist, and longtime member of the heavy metal band Black Sabbath until 2004. Nicholls also played in the NWOBHM band Quartz before joining Black Sabbath. In the 1960s/early 1970s, Geoff played lead guitar/keyboards for the Birmingham bands The Boll Weevils, The Seed, Johnny Neal and the Starliners, Bandy Legs, Jimmy Helms, Cozy Powell, Ozzy Osbourne, Tony Martin, Willie Basse and played keyboards for World of Oz.

== Career ==
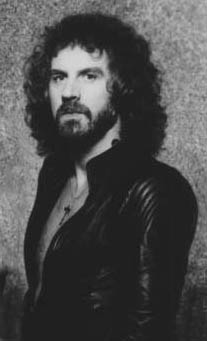
Nicholls in 1986

Nicholls was originally brought in as a second guitarist when Black Sabbath doubted whether they would even continue under that name. Nicholls then switched to bass when Geezer Butler left briefly, and then became the band's keyboardist upon Butler's return and the decision to keep the Sabbath name. Nicholls' first appearance on a Black Sabbath album was on Heaven and Hell (1980), and he was credited as keyboardist on every Sabbath release from that time until Forbidden (1995), although he was not an official member until 1986. He remained an official member until 1991, then regained member status from 1993 to 1996. He was an unofficial member once again since the reunion with Ozzy Osbourne in 1997. Although his main role with Sabbath was on the keyboard, Nicholls also played some rhythm guitar on the reunion tours, e.g., during Iommi's solo in "Snowblind" and a few tracks during the Headless Cross (1989) and Forbidden (1995) tours.

Nicholls' touring involvement with the band ended when Adam Wakeman (a member of Ozzy Osbourne's solo band) was chosen to play keyboards during Sabbath's 2004 and 2005 tours as part of Ozzfest, and Scott Warren (Dio) handled keyboard duties on the 2007 Heaven & Hell tour.

== Later life and death ==
Until his death, Nicholls played keyboards with former Black Sabbath singer Tony Martin, in his band Tony Martin's Headless Cross. Nicholls had performed on Martin's first two solo albums Back Where I Belong and Scream, and their support tours.

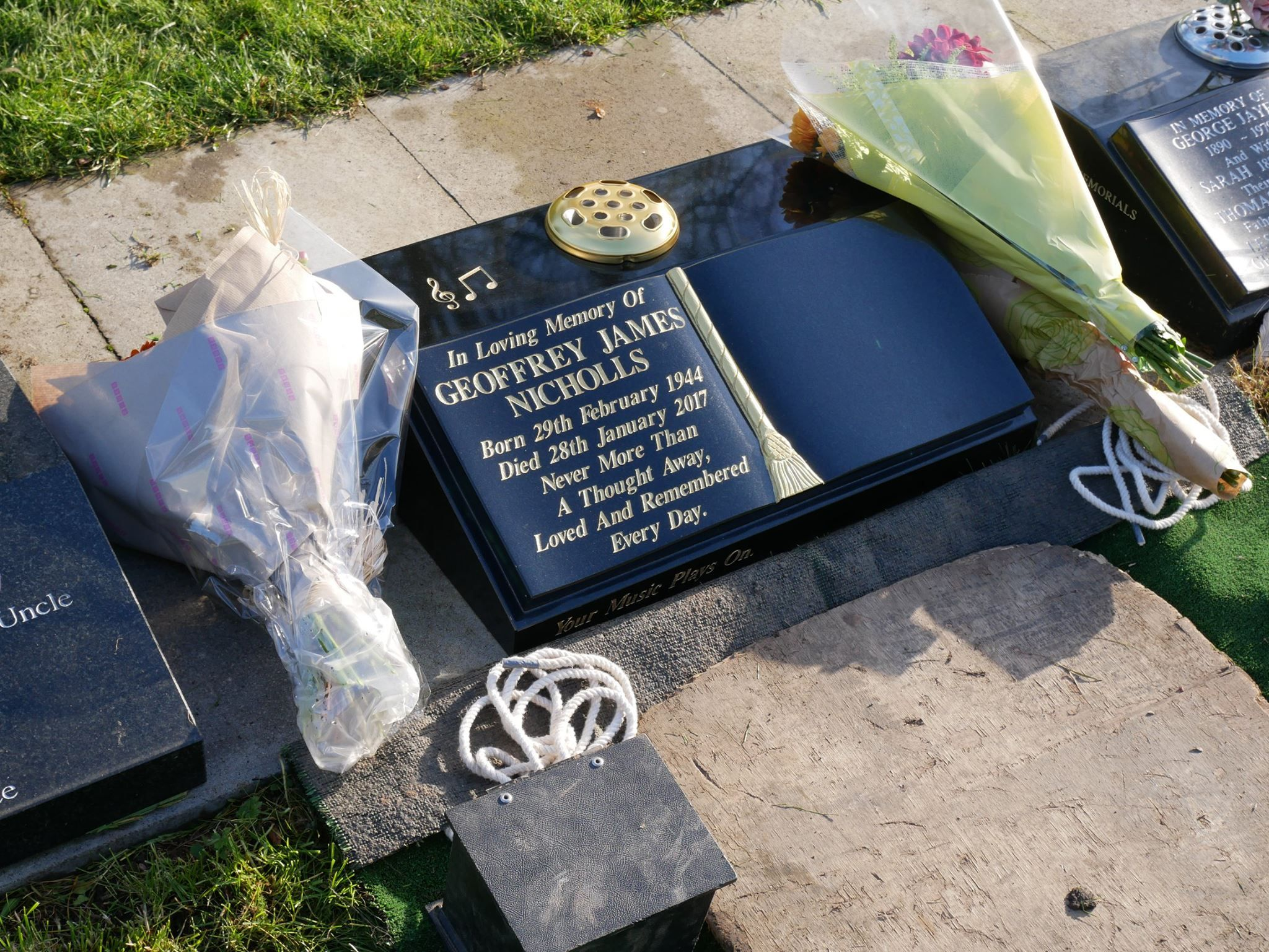
Gravestone

Nicholls died from lung cancer on 28 January 2017, aged 72, surrounded by his family. "Geoff was a real true friend and supported me all the way for nearly forty years," said Tony Iommi. "I will miss him dearly and he will live in my heart until we meet again."

== Discography ==
=== Studio albums with Black Sabbath ===
Year	Album details	Peak chart positions											Certifications
Year	Album details	UK	AUT	DEN	FIN	GER	NLD	NOR	NZ	SWE	SWI	US	Certifications
1980	Heaven and Hell: Released: 25 April 1980; Label: Vertigo, Warner Bros.; Format: CD, CS, LP	9	—	—	—	37	—	22	44	25	—	28	UK: Gold; US: Platinum; CAN: Gold
1981	Mob Rules: Released: 4 November 1981; Label: Vertigo, Warner Bros.; Format: CD, CS, LP	12	—	—	—	—	47	—	45	30	—	29	UK: Silver; US: Gold; CAN: Gold
1983	Born Again: Released: 12 September 1983; Label: Vertigo, Warner Bros.; Format: CD, CS, LP	4	—	—	—	37	—	14	44	7	—	39	UK: Gold
1986	Seventh Star: Released: 20 January 1986; Label: Vertigo, Warner Bros.; Format: CD, CS, LP	27	—	—	—	51	—	17	—	11	—	78	—
1987	The Eternal Idol: Released: November 1987; Label: Vertigo, Warner Bros.; Format: CD, CS, LP	66	—	—	—	—	—	—	—	—	—	168	—
1989	Headless Cross: Released: 17 April 1989; Label: I.R.S.; Format: CD, CS, LP	31	—	—	—	18	71	—	—	22	23	115	—
1990	Tyr: Released: 20 August 1990; Label: I.R.S.; Format: CD, CS, LP	24	24	—	—	12	77	—	—	24	24	—	—
1992	Dehumanizer: Released: 22 June 1992; Label: I.R.S.; Format: CD, CS, LP	28	7	—	31	14	63	—	—	12	13	44	—
1994	Cross Purposes: Released: 26 January 1994; Label: I.R.S.; Format: CD, CS, LP	41	23	—	—	32	85	—	—	9	41	122	—
1995	Forbidden: Released: 5 June 1995; Label: I.R.S.; Format: CD, CS	71	40	—	—	35	86	—	—	19	48	—	—
"—" denotes albums that did not chart.

=== Live albums ===
Year	Album details	Peak chart positions								Certifications
Year	Album details	UK	FIN	FRA	GER	NLD	NZ	SWE	US	Certifications
1982	Live Evil: Released: December 1982; Label: Vertigo, Warner Bros.; Format: CD, LP	13	—	—	37	34	34	15	37	—
1995	Cross Purposes Live: Released: 1995; Label: I.R.S.; Format: CD	—	—	—	—	—	—	—	—	—
1998	Reunion: Released: 20 October 1998; Label: Epic; Format: CD	41	29	65	40	—	—	11	11	US: Platinum; CAN: Platinum
"—" denotes albums that did not chart.

=== Compilation albums ===
1996	The Sabbath Stones	—	—	—	—	—	—	—	—	—
2007	Black Sabbath: The Dio Years	151	—	—	—	35	—	32	54	—
2008	The Rules of Hell	—	—	—	—	—	—	—	—	—
2024	Anno Domini 1989–1995	—	18	183	9	—	—	—	43	—
"—" denotes albums that did not chart.

== Singles ==
1980	"Heaven and Hell"	—	—	—	—	—	—	—	—	Heaven and Hell	—	—
1980	"Neon Knights"	22	—	—	—	—	—	—	—	Heaven and Hell	"Children of the Sea" (live)	—
1980	"Die Young"	41	—	—	—	—	—	—	—	Heaven and Hell	"Heaven and Hell" (live)	—
1981	"Children of the Sea"	—	—	—	—	—	—	—	—	Heaven and Hell	—	—
1981	"The Mob Rules"	46	—	—	—	—	—	—	—	Mob Rules	"Die Young" (live)	—
1982	"Turn Up the Night"	37	—	—	—	—	—	—	24	Mob Rules	"Lonely Is the Word"	—
1982	"Voodoo"	—	—	—	—	—	—	—	46	Mob Rules	—	—
1983	"Trashed"	—	—	—	—	—	—	—	—	Born Again	—	—
1986	"No Stranger to Love"	—	—	—	—	—	—	—	—	Seventh Star	—	—
1987	"The Shining"	—	—	—	—	—	—	—	—	The Eternal Idol	—	—
1989	"Headless Cross"	62	—	—	—	—	—	—	—	Headless Cross	"Cloak and Dagger"	—
1989	"Devil and Daughter"	81	—	—	—	—	—	—	—	Headless Cross	—	—
1990	"Feels Good to Me"	79	—	—	—	—	—	—	—	Tyr	"Paranoid" (live)	—
1992	"TV Crimes"	33	—	—	—	—	—	—	—	Dehumanizer	"Letters from Earth" / "Time Machine"	—
1994	"The Hand That Rocks the Cradle"	—	—	—	—	—	—	—	—	Cross Purposes	—	—
1998	"Psycho Man"	—	—	—	—	—	—	—	3	Reunion	—	—
1999	"Selling My Soul"	—	—	—	—	—	—	—	17	Reunion	—	—
"—" denotes albums that did not chart.

== Videos ==
Year	Album details	Peak chart positions						Certifications
Year	Album details	SWE	FIN	AUT	BEL	SWI	NLD	Certifications
1980	Black and Blue: Released: 1980; Label: PolyGram; Format: VHS, LaserDisc	—	—	—	—	—	—	
1991	The Black Sabbath Story, Vol. 1: Released: 1991; Label: Sanctuary; Format: VHS, LaserDisc, DVD	1	—	—	—	—	—	US: Platinum; CAN: Gold; AUS: Gold
1992	The Black Sabbath Story, Vol. 2: Released: 1992; Label: Sanctuary; Format: VHS, LaserDisc, DVD	5	—	—	—	—	—	US: Gold
1995	Cross Purposes Live: Released: 1995; Label: Picture; Format: VHS	—	—	—	—	—	—	
1999	The Last Supper: Released: 1999; Label: Sony; Format: VHS, DVD	11	—	—	—	—	—	UK: Gold
"—" denotes albums that did not chart.
