= Wheels of Confusion =

Wheels of Confusion may refer to:

- "Wheels of Confusion/The Straightener", a song by Black Sabbath from the 1972 album Black Sabbath, Vol. 4
- Under Wheels of Confusion (album), a 1996 Black Sabbath compilation album
