= Thorns (Tony Martin album) =

Studio album by Tony Martin
- Released: 14 January 2022
- Genre: Heavy metal
- Length: 49:00
- Label: Battlegod Productions / Dark Star Records
- Producer: Tony Martin

Tony Martin chronology
Scream (2005)	Thorns (2022)

Professional ratings
Review scores
Source	Rating
Blabbermouth.net	9/10
Sonic Perspectives	8.8/10

Thorns is the third solo album by English vocalist Tony Martin. It was released on 14 January 2022, 17 years after Martin's previous solo album Scream, released in 2005 and 30 years after his first solo album Back Where I Belong, released in 1992. This record features drummer Danny Needham from Venom, former HammerFall bass player Magnus Rosén, guitarist Scott McClellan, who helped co-write the album, bass player Greg Smith, and Pamela Moore sharing vocals with Martin on the title track.

== Track listing ==
All tracks are written by Tony Martin and Scott McClellan apart from Book of Shadows, Crying Wolf and This is Your Damnation, written by Tony Martin.

No.	Title	Length
1.	"As the World Burns"	4:36
2.	"Black Widow Angel"	4:02
3.	"Book of Shadows"	6:19
4.	"Crying Wolf"	4:27
5.	"Damned by You"	4:06
6.	"No Shame at All"	3:41
7.	"Nowhere to Fly"	4:48
8.	"Passion Killer"	4:50
9.	"Run Like the Devil"	3:55
10.	"This Is Your Damnation"	3:09
11.	"Thorns"	5:17

== Personnel ==
- Tony Martin – Vocals, Guitars, Bass, Violin
- Scott McClellan – Guitars
- Joe Harford - Guitars
- Dario Mollo - Guitars
- Magnus Rosén – Bass
- Greg Smith – Bass
- Bruno Sa - Keyboards
- Danny Needham – Drums

Guest musicians

- Pamela Moore - Vocals on Thorns
- Laura Harford - Voice Actor

Production

- Pete Newdeck - Mixing
- Harry Hes - Mastering

== Charts ==
Chart performance for Thorns
Chart (2022)	Peak position
Swiss Albums (Schweizer Hitparade)	45
