= Hypnotica =

Hypnotica may refer to:

- Hypnotica (medicine)
- Hypnotica (Benny Benassi album), 2003
- Hypnotica, album by former Black Sabbath singer Tony Martin and Empire (band) 2001
