= Under Wheels of Confusion =

Greatest hits album by Black Sabbath
- Released: 2 December 1996
- Genre: Heavy metal
- Label: Castle

Black Sabbath chronology
The Sabbath Stones (1996)	Under Wheels of Confusion (1996)	Reunion (1998)

Under Wheels of Confusion is a 1996 four-disc compilation album set from the English heavy metal band Black Sabbath. The album covers the years 1970–1987 (specifically, every album from Black Sabbath to The Eternal Idol).

== Reception ==
Professional ratings
Review scores
Source	Rating
AllMusic	4/5 stars
Colin Larkin	4/5 stars

Stephen Erlewine from AllMusic called the it "an unwieldy four-disc, 52-track box set". He also opined that it "dipped considerably in quality during the second half of the set, when Ozzy Osbourne left the group and was replaced by Ronnie James Dio ... and even though all of the stone-cold classics are here, as are all of Dio's best tracks, Sabbath remains best appreciated through their original albums, which capture the essence of the metal giants much better than this box".

British musician Andy Gill said this is "the one you've been waiting for ... four CDs, 52 tracks, Miltonesque biography, Pete Frame family tree, graveyard graphics, heavy-duty cardboard box - definitive evidence that if the Devil has the best tunes, then Birmingham has the bludgeoning riffs ... executed with pizzazz and facility by the spawn of Beelzebub".

== Track listing ==
Disc one

1. "Black Sabbath"
2. "The Wizard"
3. "N.I.B."
4. "Evil Woman"
5. "Wicked World"
6. "War Pigs"
7. "Paranoid"
8. "Iron Man"
9. "Planet Caravan"
10. "Hand of Doom"
11. "Sweet Leaf"
12. "After Forever"
13. "Children of the Grave"

Disc two

1. "Into the Void"
2. "Lord of This World"
3. "Orchid"
4. "Supernaut"
5. "Tomorrow's Dream"
6. "Wheels of Confusion"
7. "Changes"
8. "Snowblind"
9. "Laguna Sunrise"
10. "Cornucopia" (live)
11. "Sabbath Bloody Sabbath"
12. "Killing Yourself To Live"
13. "Hole in the Sky"
14. "Am I Going Insane (Radio)"

Disc three

1. "The Writ"
2. "Symptom of the Universe"
3. "Dirty Women"
4. "Back Street Kids"
5. "Rock 'N' Roll Doctor"
6. "She's Gone"
7. "A Hard Road"
8. "Never Say Die"
9. "Neon Knights"
10. "Heaven and Hell"
11. "Die Young"
12. "Lonely is the Word"

Disc four

1. "Turn Up the Night"
2. "The Sign of the Southern Cross"
3. "Falling Off the Edge of the World"
4. "The Mob Rules" (live)
5. "Voodoo" (live)
6. "Digital Bitch"
7. "Trashed"
8. "Hot Line"
9. "In for the Kill"
10. "Seventh Star"
11. "Heart Like a Wheel"
12. "The Shining"
13. "Eternal Idol"
