= Scream (Tony Martin album) =

Studio album by Tony Martin
- Released: 8 November 2005 (US/Canada); 21 November 2005 (UK)
- Recorded: 2004; 1998 ("Raising Hell")
- Genre: Heavy metal
- Length: 53:19
- Label: Avalon/Marquee
- Producer: Tony Martin

Tony Martin chronology
Back Where I Belong (1992)	Scream (2005)	Thorns (2022)

Professional ratings
Review scores
Source	Rating
AllMusic	3.5/5 stars

Scream is the second solo album by English rock and roll vocalist Tony Martin, after his second and final stint with Black Sabbath. It was released on 8 November 2005. The song "Raising Hell" features former Black Sabbath drummer Cozy Powell and keyboardist Geoff Nicholls. On most songs, Martin's son Joe Harford plays guitar. Nearly all other instruments are played by Martin himself (including a violin solo on "Scream").

== Track listing ==
All lyrics are written by Tony Martin except where noted

No.	Title	Writer(s)	Length
1.	"Raising Hell"	Geoff Nicholls, Martin	4:42
2.	"Bitter Sweet"	Nicholls, Martin	5:02
3.	"Faith in Madness"		5:49
4.	"I'm Gonna Live Forever"		4:30
5.	"Scream"		5:11
6.	"Surely Love is Dead"		5:06
7.	"The Kids of Today (Don't Understand The Blues)"		4:17
8.	"Wherever You Go"	Nicholls, Martin	3:01
9.	"Fields of Lies"	Nicholls, Martin	6:39
10.	"Unbearable" (Japan bonus track)		4:07

== Band members ==
- Tony Martin: lead vocals, guitar, bass, violin, drums
- Joe Harford: guitar
- Geoff Nicholls: keyboards
- Cozy Powell: drums on "Raising Hell"
