= Misha Calvin =

Misha Nisić, better known as Misha Calvin, is a Serbian rock guitarist and songwriter.

== Life and career ==
A native of Yugoslavia, Calvin arrived in London sometime in the mid 80s. He worked with ex-Black Sabbath vocalist Tony Martin and Elegy vocalist Ian Parry, producing the album Evolution, released by Vienna Records in 1993.

Two years later Evolution II was released, with Ian Parry handling vocal duties along with Dave Twose (AKA David Readman.) This time the songs were much more guitar oriented, with minimal keyboard interventions.

In 1998, Calvin switched to Panoramic Music, and released a third album entitled Riffman, with Marty Smith on vocals. Calvin's music, however, failed to catch on.

Calvin's three albums were all reissued with bonus tracks on Majestic Rock records in 2004.

Since 1998 little has been heard of him, although a compilation album entitles Decades is now available for purchase on the website http://www.mishacalvin.com/. A number of videos has also been uploaded on YouTube since the website went online to promote this compilation.

Video for "Strangers"

Video for "Falling Into You"

Video for "Reaper"

Recently Misha has released a new album called Mozart Meister Werken 256, an all instrumental album of 17 tracks in homage to Mozart himself.

== Discography ==
=== Studio albums ===
- Evolution (1993)
- Evolution II (1995)
- Riffman (1998)
