= Born Again Tour =

1983–84 concert tour by Black Sabbath

- Tour by Black Sabbath
- Associated album: Born Again
- Start date: 7 August 1983
- End date: 4 March 1984
- Legs: 4
- No. of shows: 96

Black Sabbath concert chronology
- Mob Rules Tour (1981–82); Born Again Tour (1983–84); Seventh Star Tour (1986)

The Born Again Tour was a concert tour by in support of Black Sabbath's Born Again album. Both the album and the tour were the only ones of Black Sabbath's to feature former Deep Purple frontman Ian Gillan on lead vocals. Ex-Electric Light Orchestra drummer Bev Bevan was hired to replace Bill Ward, who had returned to the band for the recording of the album after a two-year hiatus, for the tour. This was the final tour to feature original Black Sabbath bassist Geezer Butler until 1992's Dehumanizer tour.

== Background ==
After recording the Born Again album, drummer Bill Ward left the band before the start of the born Again Tour due to personal problems, and was replaced by Bev Bevan.

We did the Born Again album but I fell apart with the idea of touring. I got so much fear behind touring, I didn't talk about the fear, I drank behind the fear instead and that was a big mistake. So, I blew the Born Again tour and Bev Bevan, who is a very, very, very nice man, a very good drummer, took over the drum chair on that one.

— Bill Ward

Between 7 and 14 August 1983, the band used the National Exhibition Centre, in Birmingham, England, to rehearse. The first leg of the tour consisted of seven European shows in August, followed by a second European leg in September and October, featuring 16 shows.

"We were on flight 666 to Helsinki," recalled Geezer Butler, "and even the baggage label said 'HEL'. We were all shitting ourselves getting on that plane. I got pissed, of course. I was severely boozing then. I was pissed for that whole tour."

Two North American legs consisted of 36 shows from October through November, then 34 shows from January through March 1984.

There were many cancellations during the North American tour owing to problems with an oversized Stonehenge stage set. This was the reason that initial shows in Canada were cancelled, delaying the first North American leg. The crew also got caught in a November blizzard while crossing the Continental Divide, forcing the cancellation of two shows in Salt Lake City and Reno.

There were more difficulties during the second North American leg which delayed their shows for nearly a week. One show in Salisbury, Maryland (28 February 1984) was beset by local religious protests that were noted in the local papers, but was ultimately cancelled due to poor ticket sales. Of the 96 currently confirmed shows, 30% were likely cancelled for one reason or another. The band did manage to sell out at least a dozen shows including Saginaw, Worcester, Rockford, Providence, Cleveland, Detroit, New Haven, Portland, Philadelphia, Toronto, East Rutherford and Chicago.

== Tour dates ==
List of 1983 concerts
Date	City	Country	Venue
18 August 1983	Drammen	Norway	Drammenshallen
19 August 1983	Stockholm	Sweden	Johanneshovs Isstadion
21 August 1983	Helsinki	Finland	Helsinki Ice Hall
23 August 1983	Lund	Sweden	Olympen
24 August 1983	Copenhagen	Denmark	Falkoner Teatret
27 August 1983	Reading	England	Reading Festival
28 August 1983	Dublin	Ireland	Dalymount Park
~~10 September 1983~~	Mulhouse	France	Hippodrome de Schlierbach
13 September 1983	Barcelona	Spain	La Monumental
14 September 1983	Madrid	Spain	Estadio Román Valero
15 September 1983	San Sebastián	Spain	Velódromo de Anoeta
18 September 1983	Offenbach	West Germany	Stadthalle Offenbach
19 September 1983	Düsseldorf	West Germany	Philips Halle
20 September 1983	Mannheim	West Germany	Mannheimer Rosengarten
22 September 1983	Munich	West Germany	Circus Krone Building
24 September 1983	Frauenfeld	Switzerland	Festhalle Ruegerhols
25 September 1983	Geneva	Switzerland	Pavillon Des Sports Del Champel Geneve
27 September 1983	Neunkirchen am Brand	West Germany	Hemmerleinhalle
28 September 1983	Böblingen	West Germany	Sporthalle
30 September 1983	Paris	France	Espace Balard
1 October 1983	Brussels	Belgium	Forest National
2 October 1983	Zwolle	Netherlands	IJsselhallen
3 October 1983	Nijmegen	Netherlands	Concertgebouw de Vereeniging
~~13 October 1983~~	~~Moncton~~	Canada	~~Moncton Coliseum~~
~~15 October 1983~~	~~Halifax~~	Canada	~~Halifax Metro Center~~
17 October 1983	Rimouski	Canada	Colisée de Rimouski
18 October 1983	Chicoutimi	Canada	Centre Georges-Vézina
20 October 1983	Quebec City	Canada	Colisée de Québec
21 October 1983	Montreal	Canada	Montreal Forum
22 October 1983	Ottawa	Canada	Ottawa Civic Centre
24 October 1983	Sudbury	Canada	Sudbury Arena
25 October 1983	Toronto	Canada	Maple Leaf Gardens
~~26 October 1983~~	London	Canada	London Gardens
27 October 1983	Buffalo	United States	Buffalo Memorial Auditorium
29 October 1983	East Rutherford	United States	Brendan Byrne Arena
30 October 1983	Uniondale	United States	Nassau Veterans Memorial Coliseum
1 November 1983	Providence	United States	Providence Civic Center
2 November 1983	Landover	United States	Capital Centre
4 November 1983	Worcester	United States	Worcester Centrum
5 November 1983	Philadelphia	United States	Spectrum
6 November 1983	Portland	United States	Cumberland County Civic Center
8 November 1983	New Haven	United States	New Haven Coliseum
9 November 1983	Rochester	United States	Rochester Community War Memorial
~~10 November 1983~~	Pittsburgh	United States	Stanley Theater
11 November 1983	Detroit	United States	Cobo Arena
12 November 1983	Cleveland	United States	Public Auditorium
13 November 1983	Cincinnati	United States	Richfield Coliseum
14 November 1983	Saginaw	United States	Saginaw Civic Center
15 November 1983	Rockford	United States	Rockford MetroCentre
16 November 1983	Ashwaubenon	United States	Brown County Veterans Memorial Arena
18 November 1983	Chicago	United States	UIC Pavilion
19 November 1983	Madison	United States	Dane County Coliseum
20 November 1983	Bloomington	United States	Met Center
~~22 November 1983~~	Salt Lake City	United States	Salt Palace
23 November 1983	Reno	United States	Lawlor Events Center
25 November 1983	Paradise	United States	Aladdin Theatre for the Performing Arts
26 November 1983	Phoenix	United States	Arizona Veterans Memorial Coliseum
27 November 1983	Tucson	United States	Tucson Community Center
29 November 1983	Albuquerque	United States	Tingley Coliseum
30 November 1983	El Paso	United States	El Paso County Coliseum

List of 1984 concerts
Date	City	Country	Venue
~~16 January 1984~~	Calgary	Canada	TBA
~~17 January 1984~~	Edmonton	Canada	Northlands Coliseum
~~19 January 1984~~	Vancouver	Canada	TBA
~~20 January 1984~~	Seattle	United States	Seattle Center Coliseum
~~21 January 1984~~	Spokane	United States	Spokane Coliseum
~~23 January 1984~~	Portland	United States	Memorial Coliseum Complex
25 January 1984	Daly City	United States	Cow Palace
26 January 1984	Long Beach	United States	Long Beach Arena
28 January 1984	El Paso	United States	El Paso County Coliseum
29 January 1984	Salt Lake City	United States	Salt Palace
31 January 1984	Denver	United States	University of Denver Arena
1 February 1984	Amarillo	United States	Amarillo Civic Center
2 February 1984	Lubbock	United States	Lubbock Memorial Civic Center
3 February 1984	Corpus Christi	United States	Memorial Coliseum
4 February 1984	San Antonio	United States	Henry B. Gonzalez Convention Center
7 February 1984	Houston	United States	Sam Houston Coliseum
8 February 1984	Dallas	United States	Reunion Arena
10 February 1984	Beaumont	United States	Beaumont Civic Center
11 February 1984	Little Rock	United States	Barton Coliseum
~~12 February 1984~~	New Orleans	United States	Lakefront Arena
13 February 1984	Birmingham	United States	Boutwell Auditorium
14 February 1984	Jacksonville	United States	Jacksonville Memorial Coliseum
16 February 1984	Lakeland	United States	Lakeland Civic Center
17 February 1984	Sunrise	United States	Sunrise Musical Theater
~~18 February 1984~~	Savannah	United States	Savannah Civic Center
20 February 1984	Atlanta	United States	Fox Theatre
22 February 1984	St. Louis	United States	Kiel Auditorium
24 February 1984	Toledo	United States	Toledo Sports Arena
25 February 1984	Trotwood	United States	Hara Arena
26 February 1984	Kalamazoo	United States	Wings Stadium
~~28 February 1984~~	Salisbury	United States	Wicomico Youth and Civic Center
29 February 1984	Utica	United States	The Stanley Center for the Arts
1 March 1984	Albany	United States	Palace Theatre
~~3 March 1984~~	~~Pittsburgh~~	United States	~~Stanley Theater~~
4 March 1984	Springfield	United States	Springfield Civic Center

== Set lists ==
The set list featured two Dio-era tracks, "Heaven and Hell" and "Neon Knights", as well as a good helping from the new album, and a few fan favorites reappeared in the set, such as "Supernaut" and "Rock 'n' Roll Doctor". Each show on the tour ended with a two-song encore, with the first song being a cover of the Deep Purple classic "Smoke on the Water", as Ian Gillan was formerly of Deep Purple. This is one of the few cover songs Black Sabbath have ever done at live shows. They played the song on Iommi's suggestion. He felt it was a 'bum deal' that Gillan had to perform so many old Sabbath songs and none of his own.

=== Songs played on the tour ===
- "Supertzar"
- "Children of the Grave"
- "Hot Line"
- "War Pigs"
- "Born Again"
- "Supernaut
- "Rock 'n' Roll Doctor" ("Horrible," recalled Iommi. "It was difficult for him [Gillan] to sing certain Sabbath songs.)"
- "Stonehenge"
- "Disturbing the Priest"
- "Keep It Warm"
- "Black Sabbath"
- "The Dark"
- "Zero the Hero"
- "Heaven and Hell"
- "Neon Knights"
- "Digital Bitch"
- "Iron Man"
- "Smoke on the Water"
- "Paranoid"
- "Children of the Sea" (extract)

=== Songs rehearsed for the tour, but never played live ===
- "Sabbra Cadabra"
- "Evil Woman"
- "Never Say Die"
- "Symptom of the Universe"
- "N.I.B."
- "The Wizard"
- "Tomorrow's Dream"

== Staging ==
There were many problems surrounding the tour for the album, including having little room on stage owing to it being decorated with Stonehenge replicas. In 2005, Geezer Butler explained:

It had nothing to do with me. In fact, I was the one who thought it was really corny. We had Sharon Osbourne’s dad, Don Arden, managing us. He came up with the idea of having the stage set be Stonehenge. He wrote the dimensions down and gave it to our tour manager. He wrote it down in meters but he meant to write it down in feet. The people who made it saw fifteen meters instead of fifteen feet. It was 45 feet high and it wouldn’t fit on any stage anywhere so we just had to leave it in the storage area. It cost a fortune to make but there was not a building on Earth that you could fit it into.

Ian Gillan maintained that Stonehenge was indeed Geezer's idea – and that, asked for details by set buildings Light and Sound Design, Geezer had simply said: "Life-size." Filling three containers, it was too big for any stage, so only a small part of it was used at a time, but the band and crew still had problems edging between the monoliths.

"We couldn't believe the size of it when we saw it," recalled Iommi. "We seen it when we rehearsed at the NEC [in Birmingham] for a whole and we'd only seen it on the floor; parts of it – they hadn't finished it… It gets to [the 1983] Reading [festival] and we've got these huge ones at the back that are just, like, gigantic."

Photos of the Born Again tour show that at least some of the stones were present on stage.

The tour's early stages featured a dwarf, dressed to look like the demon-infant from the album cover.

The dimension problems and use of dwarfs bear strong similarities to the infamous Stonehenge scene in the movie This Is Spinal Tap, released a year after Sabbath's tour but filmed a year beforehand in 1982. "It was great when I saw that film, though," recalled Butler, "because it was at the end of that tour with Gillan… I thought they'd had a spy with us or something – it was so like us."

== Personnel ==
- Tony Iommi – guitar
- Geezer Butler – bass guitar
- Ian Gillan – vocals
- Bev Bevan – drums
- Geoff Nicholls – keyboards (performed off stage)
