= World of Oz =

English psychedelic pop band in the 1960s

The World of Oz
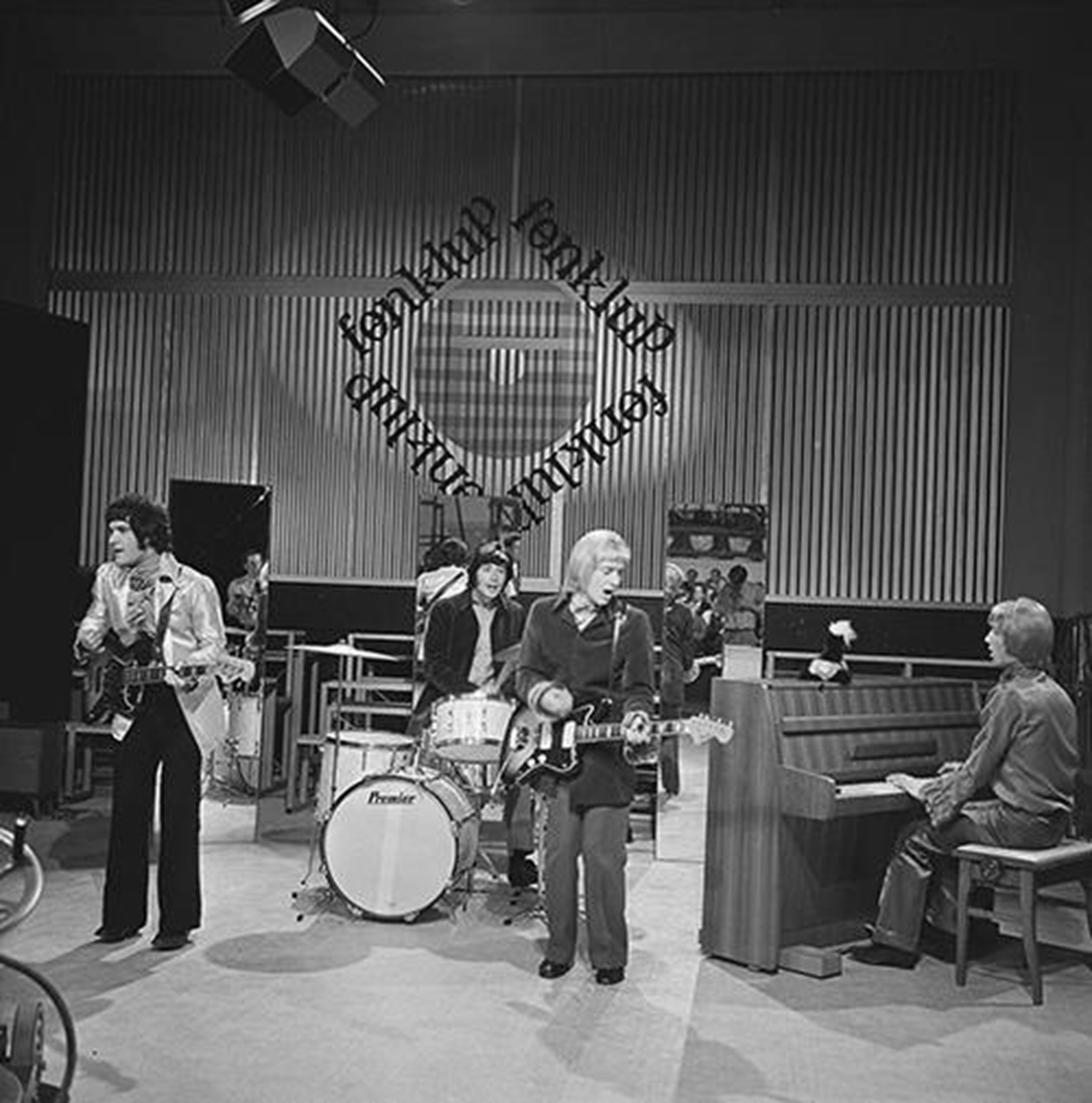
- World of Oz (Dutch TV, May 1968)

Background information
- Origin: Birmingham, West Midlands, England
- Genres: Psychedelic pop; psychedelic rock
- Years active: 1968 - 1969
- Label: Deram

The World of Oz was an English psychedelic pop band from the 1960s. The band released a self-titled LP in 1968 and two charting singles, "The Muffin Man" and "King Croesus", before fading into relative obscurity. The album gained wider recognition after it was re-issued on CD.

== Career ==
The band formed in January 1968 in Birmingham by Chris Evans and David Reay who recruited David 'Kubie' Kubinec and Tony Clarkson. They were signed to Sparta Florida Music on 13 February 1968, and relocated to London to record with Deram Records. Their song, "The Muffin Man" was released on 3 May 1968, and it was a minor hit in the UK and reached the Top 10 in a number of European countries, including the Netherlands and Belgium. However, a week after the single was released, their manager Barry Class left for America to manage his other band, The Foundations, and Michael Levi who took over management duty cut the promotional budget for the record, with the result that the single failed to chart higher.

Despite the lack of a hit US single, the band recorded the album with changing lineups. Geoff Nicholls replaced Kubinec when the album was half-recorded. Rob Moore then replaced Reay who left to move into group management. They released a second single "King Croesus" on 16 August 1968.

The album was released in February 1969 to favourable reviews, and "Willow’s Harp" was also released as a single on February 7, 1969. The group appeared on the BBC2 television programme, "Colour Me Pop" on 8 March 1969. Also in 1969, they were one of the musical acts (alongside Karlheinz Stockhausen, Tristram Carey, Daphne Oram and others) featured in David Buckton's BBC television documentary on electronic music production, "The Same Trade As Mozart", in the "Workshop" series. Their TV appearance was used to explain multi-track recording techniques.

A further single, "The Hum-Gum Tree", was released in May 1969, although according to the files of Decca this release in Britain was unofficial. Their 1969 releases failed to achieve any level of commercial success, and lack of success prompted the band to break up soon after.

== Line-up ==
- Christopher Robin Evans (vocals/guitar)
- Tony Clarkson (bass)
- David 'Kube' Kubinec (guitar/organ)
- David Reay (drums)
- Geoff Nicholls (organ/guitar)
- Rob Moore (drums)

== Discography ==
=== Albums ===
- The World of Oz (March 1969)

=== Singles ===
Title	Date	Peak chart positions		
Title	Date	UK	NL	US Cashbox
"The Muffin Man" b/w "Peter's Birthday"	3 May 1968	52	6	—
"King Croesus" b/w "Jack"	16 August 1968	—	9	94
"Willow's Harp" b/w "Like a Tear"	7 February 1969	—	—	—
"The Hum Gum Tree" b/w "Beside The Fire" (unofficial)	May 1969	—	—	—

(all of the above singles tracks except for "Peter's Birthday" were from their LP)
