= Seventh Star =

1986 studio album by Black Sabbath

Studio album by Black Sabbath
- Released: 20 January 1986
- Recorded: June–August 1985
- Studios: Cherokee (Los Angeles); Cheshire Sound (Atlanta)
- Genres: Hard rock; heavy metal
- Length: 35:00
- Labels: Vertigo (Europe); Warner Bros. (US)
- Producer: Jeff Glixman

Black Sabbath chronology
The Sabbath Collection (1985)	Seventh Star (1986)	The Eternal Idol (1987)

Singles from Seventh Star
- 1. "No Stranger to Love" Released: 1986 (EU)

Seventh Star is the twelfth studio album by the English heavy metal band Black Sabbath. Released on 20 January 1986 in the United States and on 17 February 1986 in the United Kingdom, it features founding guitarist Tony Iommi alongside musicians Geoff Nicholls, Eric Singer, and Dave Spitz, playing keyboards, drums, and bass, respectively, and Glenn Hughes as lead singer. The album was the group's first release without bassist and primary lyricist Geezer Butler, who left the band in 1984 after the Born Again tour. Seventh Star was originally intended as the first solo album by Iommi. Because of the pressures from Warner Bros. Records and the prompting of band manager Don Arden, the record was billed as Black Sabbath featuring Tony Iommi.

Despite the complications behind the album's production, it earned moderate commercial success and reaching number 27 in the UK and number 78 on the Billboard 200 chart.

== Album information ==
As was the case with its predecessor, Born Again, this album was not intended to be a Black Sabbath record. Last-minute pressure from Warner Brothers stemmed from the belief an Iommi solo record would be less successful. Its sound is a drastic, and intentional, departure from the trademark Sabbath sound. Many of the songs have a very hard rock sound, while some contain a bluesy feel (especially "Heart Like a Wheel"). Seventh Star was the first album to feature long-time keyboardist Geoff Nicholls as an official band member.

"It seemed to me like the band was on its last legs and my heart just went out to Tony," recalled former drummer Bill Ward. "I thought, 'God, how much more can he take?' or 'How much more does he want?'… What I saw was a great band I just felt was diminishing."

The promo-single and video version of "No Stranger to Love" had additional harmony vocals added by Hughes to make it more radio-friendly. Actress Denise Crosby was featured in the video.

A tour for the album featured Hughes only at the first few shows. He was fired five dates into the tour, and replaced by Ray Gillen, who completed the North American and European legs of the tour, though several dates in the US were cancelled. W.A.S.P. and Anthrax were opening acts on the North American tour.

Hughes has performed "No Stranger to Love", "Seventh Star" and "Heart Like a Wheel" at some of his live concerts. "I really like Seventh Star," Tony Martin told Sabbath fanzine Southern Cross, "mainly because I admire Glenn Hughes' voice."

Seventh Star was rereleased in Europe on 1 November 2010, as a two-disc special edition. Disc 2 includes a concert recorded in 1986, with Gillen on vocals. The single version of No Stranger to Love is a bonus track on disc one.

== Reviews and reception ==
Professional ratings
Review scores
Source	Rating
AllMusic	3/5 stars
Classic Rock	5/10
Martin Popoff	7/10
(The New) Rolling Stone Album Guide	2/5 stars

The album peaked at number 78 on the Billboard 200 chart. Some retrospective critical assessments of the album have been negative; for example, The New Rolling Stone Album Guide rated the release only two out of five stars.

However, critic Eduardo Rivadavia of AllMusic gave Seventh Star a mixed to positive review, praising what he saw as the "fiery tunefulness" that makes "aggressive hard rockers like 'In for the Kill', 'Turn to Stone', and 'Danger Zone' uncommonly catchy". However, he argued that the songwriting and vocal work fell flat on songs such as the album's title track. He stated generally that he found the release an "often misunderstood and underrated album".

Reviews from the period were more positive. A reviewer for the magazine Kerrang! gave Seventh Star a perfect score of five out of five.

== Track listing ==
=== Standard edition ===
All tracks are written by Tony Iommi; additional lyrics by Jeff Glixman, Geoff Nicholls and Glenn Hughes.

Side A
No.	Title	Length
1.	"In for the Kill"	3:42
2.	"No Stranger to Love"	4:29
3.	"Turn to Stone"	3:30
4.	"Sphinx (The Guardian)"	1:11
5.	"Seventh Star"	5:21

Side B
No.	Title	Length
6.	"Danger Zone"	4:25
7.	"Heart Like a Wheel"	6:38
8.	"Angry Heart"	3:06
9.	"In Memory..."	2:35

2010 Deluxe Edition Disc one - bonus track
No.	Title	Length
10.	"No Stranger to Love" (Single remix)	4:00

2010 Deluxe Edition Disc two
No.	Title	Length
1.	"The Mob Rules"	2:59
2.	"Danger Zone"	4:44
3.	"War Pigs"	8:10
4.	"Seventh Star"	5:01
5.	"Die Young"	3:58
6.	"Black Sabbath"	9:33
7.	"N.I.B."	1:37
8.	"Neon Knights"	4:36
9.	"Paranoid"	3:17

Recorded at Hammersmith Odeon in London on 2 June 1986, featuring Ray Gillen performing vocals.

=== South Korean edition ===
Side A
No.	Title	Length
1.	"Sphinx (The Guardian)"	1:21
2.	"Turn to Stone"	3:27
3.	"No Stranger to Love"	4:28

Side B
No.	Title	Length
4.	"Heart Like a Wheel"	6:35
5.	"Angry Heart"	3:06
6.	"In Memory..."	2:34

== Personnel ==
Personnel taken from Seventh Star liner notes.

Black Sabbath

- Tony Iommi – guitars
- Glenn Hughes – vocals
- Eric Singer – drums
- Dave "The Beast" Spitz – bass
- Geoff Nicholls – keyboards

Additional musician

- Gordon Copley – bass on "No Stranger to Love"

Production

- Jeff Glixman – production, engineering
- Scott Church – engineering assistance
- Greg Fulginiti – mastering
- Steve J. Gerdes – art direction, design
- Kevin Stapleton – photography

== Release history ==
Region	Date	Label
United States	20 January 1986	Warner Bros. Records
Europe	17 February 1986	Vertigo Records
Japan	March 1986	Nippon Phonogram
South Korea	May 1986	Vertigo Records
United Kingdom	1996	Castle Communications
United Kingdom	2004	Sanctuary Records
United Kingdom	2010	Sanctuary Records/Universal Music Group
United Kingdom	10 July 2026	BMG
United States	10 July 2026	Warner; Rhino

== Charts ==
Chart (1986)	Peak position
Australian Albums (Kent Music Report)	88
Canada Top Albums/CDs (RPM)	66
European Albums Chart	31
Finnish Albums (The Official Finnish Charts)	10
German Albums (Offizielle Top 100)	51
Norwegian Albums (VG-lista)	17
Swedish Albums (Sverigetopplistan)	11
UK Albums (Official Charts)	27
US Billboard 200	78

Chart (2026)	Peak position
Greek Albums (IFPI)	63
