= Cross Purposes Live =

Live album by Black Sabbath

Live album by Black Sabbath
- Released: 13 March 1995
- Recorded: 13 April 1994
- Venues: Hammersmith Apollo, London
- Genre: Heavy metal
- Length: 70:09
- Label: I.R.S.
- Producer: Black Sabbath

Black Sabbath chronology
Cross Purposes (1994)	Cross Purposes Live (1995)	Forbidden (1995)

Cross Purposes Live

Video by Black Sabbath
- Released: 13 March 1995
- Recorded: 13 April 1994
- Venues: Hammersmith Apollo, London
- Genre: Heavy metal
- Length: 71 min (CD) 87 min. (VHS)
- Label: PMI
- Director: Duncan Smith
- Producers: Will Ashurst, Martin R. Smith

Black Sabbath video chronology
The Black Sabbath Story, Vol. 2 (1992)	Cross Purposes Live (1995)	The Last Supper (1999)

Cross Purposes Live is a boxed set released by the English heavy metal band Black Sabbath in March 1995. The set comprised a live album on CD and a VHS tape of a concert recorded at the Hammersmith Apollo in London on Wednesday 13 April 1994, recorded on the band's tour for their Cross Purposes album. The tour was notable for being the first time The Wizard had been played since early 1971, when Ozzy Osbourne was still lead vocalist. It is Black Sabbath's only live album with singer Tony Martin. The CD was housed within an oversized videotape case but had its own inserts and jewel case.

Both the original CD and VHS tape are out of print, but an hour long unlicensed DVD was released with nine of the sixteen original video tracks. This release includes the promo videoclip of "Feels Good to Me", from 1990's Tyr.

== Track listings ==
No.	Title	Writer(s)	Release Medium; Original Album	Length
1.	"Time Machine"	Ronnie James Dio, Tony Iommi, Geezer Butler	CD, VHS, DVD; Dehumanizer	5:08
2.	"Children of the Grave"	Ozzy Osbourne, Iommi, Butler, Bill Ward	CD, VHS, DVD; Master of Reality	5:25
3.	"I Witness"	Tony Martin, Iommi, Butler	CD, VHS, DVD; Cross Purposes	5:02
4.	"The Mob Rules"	Dio, Iommi, Butler	VHS, DVD; Mob Rules	3:24
5.	"Into the Void"	Osbourne, Iommi, Butler, Ward	CD, VHS, DVD; Master of Reality	6:39
6.	"Anno Mundi"	Martin, Iommi, Cozy Powell, Neil Murray, Geoff Nicholls	VHS, DVD; Tyr	6:12
7.	"Black Sabbath"	Osbourne, Iommi, Butler, Ward	CD, VHS; Black Sabbath	8:12
8.	"Neon Knights"	Dio, Iommi, Butler, Ward	VHS; Heaven and Hell	5:00
9.	"Psychophobia"	Martin, Iommi, Butler	CD, VHS; Cross Purposes	3:03
10.	"The Wizard"	Osbourne, Iommi, Butler, Ward	CD, VHS; Black Sabbath	4:42
11.	"Cross of Thorns"	Martin, Iommi, Butler	CD, VHS; Cross Purposes	4:43
12.	"Symptom of the Universe"	Osbourne, Iommi, Butler, Ward	CD, VHS, DVD; Sabotage	5:59
13.	"Drum Solo"	Bobby Rondinelli	CD, VHS, DVD; N/A	1:32
14.	"Headless Cross"	Martin, Iommi, Powell	CD, VHS, DVD; Headless Cross	5:33
15.	"Paranoid/Heaven and Hell"	Osbourne, Iommi, Butler, Ward/Dio, Iommi, Butler, Ward	CD, VHS, DVD; Paranoid/Heaven and Hell	5:13
16.	"Iron Man"	Osbourne, Iommi, Butler, Ward	CD, VHS; Paranoid	3:27
17.	"Sabbath Bloody Sabbath"	Osbourne, Iommi, Butler, Ward	CD, VHS; Sabbath Bloody Sabbath	6:11

== Personnel ==
- Tony Martin – vocals
- Tony Iommi – guitars
- Geezer Butler – bass
- Geoff Nicholls – keyboards
- Bobby Rondinelli – drums
