= Back Where I Belong (Tony Martin album) =

Studio album by Tony Martin
- Released: 1992
- Recorded: 1992 at Revolution Studios, Cheshire, England
- Genre: Hard rock
- Length: 51:41
- Label: Polydor
- Producer: Nick Tauber and Tony Martin

Tony Martin chronology
Back Where I Belong (1992)	Scream (2005)

Professional ratings
Review scores
Source	Rating
AllMusic	2.5/5 stars

Back Where I Belong is the first solo album by English rock and roll singer Tony Martin. It was recorded after Martin was briefly replaced in Black Sabbath by Ronnie James Dio in the early nineties, and was released in 1992. When recording demos for the album, Martin played all the instruments himself; for the finished product, however, a variety of musicians were involved. On this album, the singer covered "Jerusalem", which originally appeared on Tyr, a Black Sabbath album on which Martin sang.

== Track listing ==
All tracks are written by Tony Martin unless stated otherwise

No.	Title	Writer(s)	Length
1.	"If It Ain't Worth Fighting For"		4:10
2.	"It Ain't Good Enough"		4:20
3.	"If There is a Heaven"		4:58
4.	"Back Where I Belong"		4:36
5.	"Ceasefire"		1:30
6.	"Why Love"		4:03
7.	"Sweet Elyse"		4:41
8.	"The Last Living Tree"		4:02
9.	"Now You've Gone"		4:18
10.	"India"		4:16
11.	"Angel in the Bed"		4:39
12.	"The Road to Galilee" (Instrumental)	Nicholls	1:48
13.	"Jerusalem"	Iommi, Martin, Murray, Nicholls, and Powell	4:20

== Band members ==
- Tony Martin – vocals (all), acoustic guitars (13), electric guitars (2-11), guitar solos (5, 8, 11)
- Brian May – guitars (3)
- Paul Wright – guitars (2 (solo), 7, 9, 10)
- Adrian Dawson – guitars (2 (solo), 7 (solo) 9 (solo), 10)
- Carlo Fragnito – guitars (1, 4, 7, 9, 10, 11, 13)
- Richard Cottle – keyboards & saxophone (1 (key+sax), 2, 3, 4, 7, 8, 9, 10, 11)
- Geoff Nicholls – keyboards (5, 6, 12, 13)
- Neil Murray – bass (1, 2, 3, 4, 7, 10, 11, 13)
- Laurence Cottle – bass (5, 6, 8, 9)
- Zak Starkey – drums (2, 3, 8, 9, 10, 11)
- Nigel Glockler – drums (1, 4, 6, 7, 13)
