= Tony Martin (British singer) =

English heavy metal singer

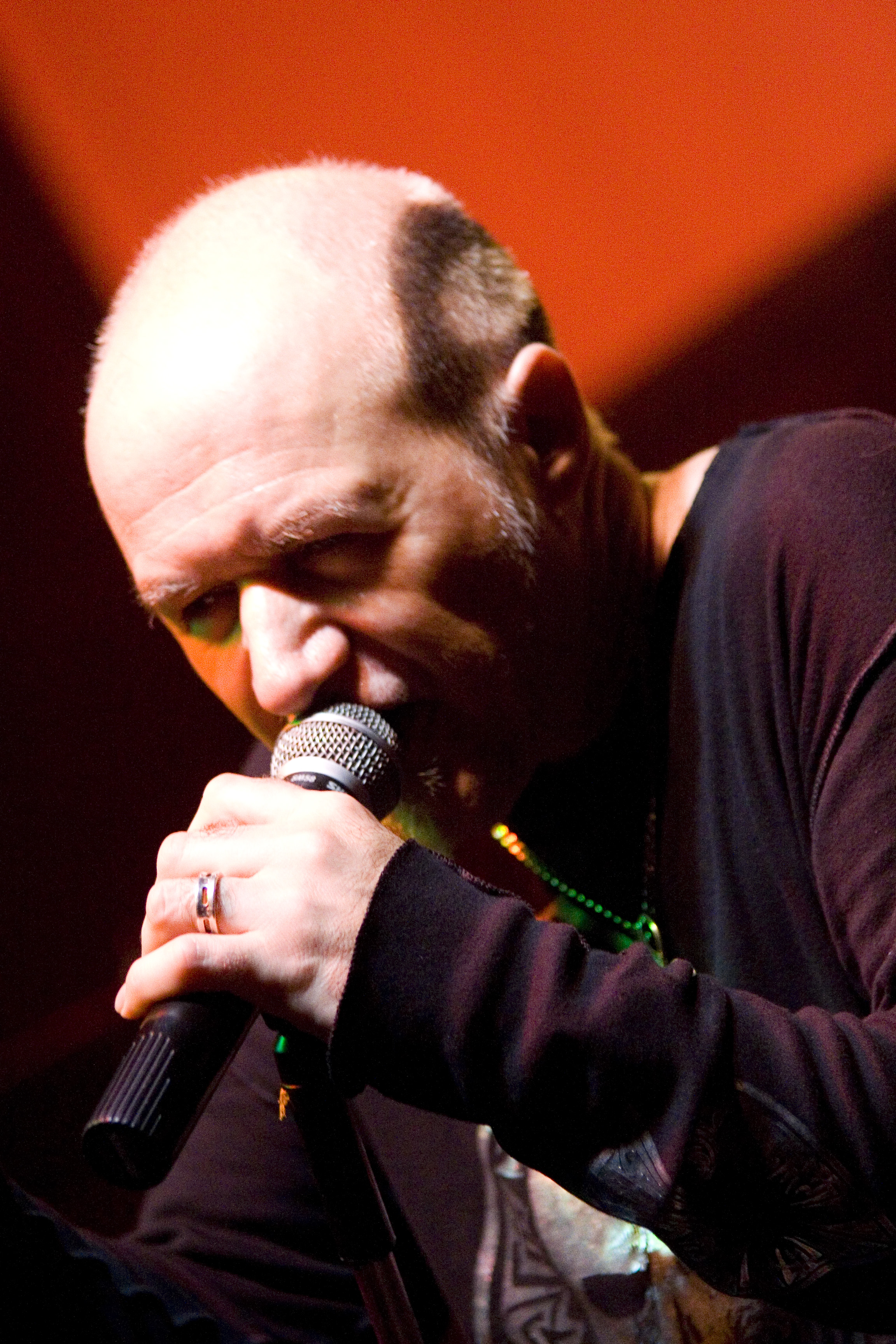
- Martin performing in 2009

Background information
- Also known as: The Cat
- Born: Anthony Philip Harford; 19 April 1957 (age 69); Birmingham, England
- Genres: Heavy metal; hard rock; blues rock; doom metal; power metal
- Occupations: Singer, songwriter
- Years active: 1964–present
- Member of: Giuntini Project
- Formerly of: Black Sabbath; Cozy Powell's Hammer; Empire; Phenomena; Forcefield; The Company of Snakes; Blue Murder

Anthony Philip Harford (born 19 April 1957), better known by his stage name Tony Martin, is an English heavy metal vocalist, best known for his time fronting Black Sabbath, initially from 1987 to 1991 and again from 1993 to 1997. Martin was the band's second-longest-serving vocalist after Ozzy Osbourne. He has since been involved in other projects, including M3, Misha Calvin, The Cage, Giuntini Project, and Phenomena.

Despite performing almost exclusively as a vocalist, Martin is a multi-instrumentalist, stating in an interview that he plays guitar, bass, drums, violin, keyboards, harmonica, bagpipes, and pan pipes. On his 2005 solo album Scream, Martin performed vocals, bass, drums, violin and additional guitar parts.

== Career ==
=== Black Sabbath, The Eternal Idol, Headless Cross and Tyr (1987–90) ===
During the recording of The Eternal Idol (1987), Martin was brought in to re-record Ray Gillen's tracks, alongside former Electric Light Orchestra drummer Bev Bevan who had previously been in Black Sabbath during 1983–84 on the Born Again tour.

Martin had been contacted by Black Sabbath to replace Glenn Hughes the year previous. He secured his place in the band after a successful audition singing the track "The Shining". Before the release of the new album, Black Sabbath accepted an offer to play six shows at Sun City, South Africa during the apartheid era. During this period Geezer Butler was coerced into rejoining the band with Bev Bevan remaining on drums. The band was supposed to play a music festival in Plymouth on 18 July, but Butler backed out at the last minute even though Martin and Sabbath had been in rehearsals from 14–16 July in preparation.

The band drew criticism from activists and artists involved with Artists United Against Apartheid, who had been boycotting South Africa since 1985. Bev Bevan refused to play the shows, and was replaced by Terry Chimes, formerly of The Clash. After nearly a year in production, Martin's debut with Sabbath The Eternal Idol was released on 8 December 1987 and ignored by contemporary reviewers. On-line internet era reviews were mixed. AllMusic said that "Martin's powerful voice added new fire" to the band, and the album contained "some of Iommi's heaviest riffs in years".

The album would stall at No. 66 in the UK, peaking at 168 in the US. Sabbath toured in support of Eternal Idol in Germany, Italy and for the first time, Greece. Unfortunately, in part because of a backlash from promoters over the South Africa incident, other European shows were cancelled. Bassist Dave Spitz left the band shortly before the tour, and was replaced by Jo Burt, formerly of Virginia Wolf.

Following the poor commercial performance of The Eternal Idol, Black Sabbath was dropped by Vertigo Records and Warner Bros. Records, and signed with I.R.S. Records. The band took time off in 1988, returning in August to begin work on their next album. As a result of the recording troubles with Eternal Idol, Tony Iommi opted to produce the band's next album himself. "It was a completely new start", Iommi said. "I had to rethink the whole thing, and decided that we needed to build up some credibility again". Iommi enlisted ex-Rainbow drummer Cozy Powell, long-time keyboardist Geoff Nicholls and session bassist Laurence Cottle, and rented a "very cheap studio in England".

Black Sabbath released Headless Cross in April 1989, and this album was again ignored by contemporary reviewers. Eventually, AllMusic would give the album four stars, calling Headless Cross "the finest non-Ozzy or Dio Black Sabbath album". Anchored by the number 62 charting single "Headless Cross", the album reached number 31 on the UK charts, and number 115 in the US. Queen guitarist Brian May, a good friend of Iommi's, played a guest solo on the song "When Death Calls". Black Sabbath was told by Gloria Butler that Geezer was going to join the band again. The band waited until April 1989 for Butler, but Geezer instead went and joined Ozzy Osbourne's band. Following the album's release, the band added touring bassist Neil Murray, formerly of Whitesnake, Gary Moore's backing band, and Vow Wow.

The ill-fated Headless Cross U.S. tour began in May 1989 with openers Kingdom Come and Silent Rage, but because of poor ticket sales, the tour was cancelled after just eight shows in the US and two in Canada. The European leg of the tour began in September, where the band were enjoying chart success. After a string of Japanese shows, the band embarked on a 24 date Russian tour with Girlschool. Black Sabbath was one of the first bands to tour the USSR, after Mikhail Gorbachev opened the country to western acts for the first time in 1989.

Tony Martin returned to the studio with Black Sabbath in February 1990 to record Tyr, the follow-up to Headless Cross. While not technically a concept album, some of the album's lyrical themes are loosely based on Norse mythology. Tyr was released on 6 August 1990, and reached number 24 on the UK albums chart, but was the first Black Sabbath release not to break the Billboard 200 in the US. The album would receive mixed internet-era reviews, with AllMusic noting that the band "mix myth with metal in a crushing display of musical synthesis", while Blender gave the album just one star, claiming that "Iommi continues to besmirch the Sabbath name with this unremarkable collection". The band toured in support of Tyr with Circus of Power in Europe, but the final seven UK dates were cancelled because of poor ticket sales. For the first time in their career, the band's touring cycle did not include US dates. The tour had a few surprises, that being that Ian Gillan, Geezer Butler, and Brian May made appearances during a few of the shows.

Butler officially rejoined the band after the end of the Tyr tour ahead of the Dehumanizer (1992) album with the intention of putting something back together with Tony Iommi and Cozy Powell. In an interview with Geezer Butler and Tony Iommi in Kerrang in mid-1991 they talked about having to "get rid of" Tony Martin. This effectively ended Martin's first spell with the band.

=== Brief Departure from Sabbath and Back Where I Belong (1991–93) ===
Tony Martin recorded his first solo album Back Where I Belong (1992) while Black Sabbath had reunited with Ronnie James Dio for the Dehumanizer (1992) album.

At the demo level for Back Where I Belong, Tony Martin played all the instruments and the album itself featured former Black Sabbath members bassist Neil Murray and drummer Cozy Powell, as well as Brian May on guitar, among others. Cozy Powell also joined the band for the subsequent tour after leaving Black Sabbath himself. There were two singles released for the album. The first was "If There Is a Heaven", and the second was "Angel in the Bed". This album includes a version of "Jerusalem" from the Black Sabbath album Tyr (1990).

Tony Martin stated that "Back Where I Belong is an album of songs that were written over the period between 1990 and 1991. The title reflects my feelings at having this opportunity to write, record, and perform my own material. The recording of this album has been made possible due to the contributions of the following people who have all given their individual and very special talents to this project, for which I would like to express my eternal thanks!" Tony Martin returned briefly to Black Sabbath to work on Dehumanizer (1992) when things were not working out with Ronnie James Dio. He, Geoff Nicholls and Cozy Powell worked on a song called "Raising Hell" during these sessions which subsequently ended up on Martins second solo album Scream (2005).

Martin said: "I had already started my first solo album Back Where I Belong so when I got the call to go back I was committed by that point. And in fact it was just a couple of months after they had started the thing with Ronnie James Dio. I was determined to finish my solo thing and so turned them down at that point. We did keep in touch though and I went to some shows. Ronnie wasn’t too pleased, but eventually they had enough and asked me to rejoin again later so it felt like I hadn’t actually left. In fact, I was never formally fired, the phone just stopped ringing. Ian Gillan [Deep Purple singer, also another ex-Black Sabbath lead singer] asked me once if I had actually been fired and I said, "No." He said, "Neither have I." We should just turn up one day and walk on stage!"

Martin's return to Sabbath at this stage was again short lived as Warner Bros had paid a huge amount of advance money for Dehumanizer, and again, record company pressure forced another change, they wanted either Ozzy Osbourne or Dio. Tony Martin was again forced out from the band in favour of Dio.

Tony Martin famously met Dio on the Dehumanizer tour after being invited to the show by Iommi & Butler. Martin would be flown in to replace Dio (who had left the band over the Ozzy Osbourne retirement show) on the last show of the tour but after visa problems Rob Halford was asked to do the show instead.

=== Return to Black Sabbath, Cross Purposes and Forbidden (1993–97) ===
Drummer Vinny Appice left the band following the reunion show to join Ronnie James Dio's solo band, later appearing on Dio's Strange Highways and Angry Machines. After Iommi & Butler realised that the Ozzy Osbourne reunion talks were breaking down they enlisted former Rainbow drummer Bobby Rondinelli, and reinstated Martin. Martins 4th album with Sabbath, Cross Purposes, was released on 8 February 1994. The album received mixed reviews, with Blender giving the album two stars, calling Soundgarden's 1994 album Superunknown "a far better Sabbath album than this by-the-numbers potboiler". AllMusic's Bradley Torreano called Cross Purposes "the first album since Born Again that actually sounds like a real Sabbath record".

The album just missed the Top 40 in the UK reaching number 41, and also reached 122 on the Billboard 200 in the US. Cross Purposes contained the song "Evil Eye", which was co-written by Van Halen guitarist Eddie Van Halen, although uncredited because of record label restrictions. Touring in support of Cross Purposes began in February 1994 with Morbid Angel and Motörhead in the US. The band filmed a live performance at the Hammersmith Apollo on 13 April 1994, which was released on VHS accompanied by a CD, entitled Cross Purposes Live. After the European tour with Cathedral and Godspeed in June 1994, drummer Bobby Rondinelli quit the band and was replaced by original Black Sabbath drummer Bill Ward for five shows in South America. Following the touring cycle for Cross Purposes, bassist Geezer Butler quit the band for the second time.

Iommi would criticize Martin during this period in his book, to which Martin responded; "It surprises me. I mean, they never said anything to me. Surely, if you've got a problem, the first person you should say something to is the person that's in the band with you... You don't wait ten years. It sounds like a really stupid thing to say, as they didn't say anything to my face – and, if that's the case, then more fool them for not saying anything, because, you know, we could have fixed it. I said to them, endlessly, that if there was anything they wanted changed, done differently, just to say and we could fix it, but clearly they didn't, they hadn't got the guts to, obviously, and to write about it in a book afterwards seems a bit daft to me. I'm not bitter about it, but it is surprising… it seems a bit stupid to say that after the event".

Following Butler's departure, newly returned drummer Bill Ward once again left the band. Butler and Ward were meant to have recorded Forbidden (1995). In the wake of their departure Iommi then reinstated former members Neil Murray on bass and Cozy Powell on drums, effectively reuniting the TYR line-up. The band enlisted Body Count guitarist Ernie C to produce the new album, which was recorded in London in the fall of 1994. The album featured a guest vocal on "Illusion of Power" by Body Count vocalist Ice-T. The resulting Forbidden was released on 8 June 1995, but failed to chart in the US or the UK. The album was widely panned by critics; AllMusic's Bradley Torreano said "with boring songs, awful production, and uninspired performances, this is easily avoidable for all but the most enthusiastic fan"; while Blender magazine called Forbidden "an embarrassment ... the band's worst album".

Black Sabbath embarked on a world tour in July 1995 with openers Motörhead and Tiamat, but two months into the tour, drummer Cozy Powell left the band, citing health issues, and was replaced by former drummer Bobby Rondinelli. This would be Martin's final tour with the band.

In December 1996, both Tony Martin (via a letter to Sam Naugler) and Iommi (via an interview with Pete Scott) both confirmed that Martin was not "out" of Sabbath, so as late as December 1996, it would appear that Iommi intended on going forward with the band as it last existed at the end of 1995. As for the rest of the band, Neil Murray was working with Cozy Powell in Peter Green's (founder of Fleetwood Mac) 'Splinter Group'.

In 1997, Tony Iommi disbanded the contemporary line-up to officially reunite with Ozzy Osbourne and the original Black Sabbath line-up. Vocalist Tony Martin claimed that an original line-up reunion had been in the works since the band's brief reunion at Ozzy Osbourne's 1992 Costa Mesa show, and that the band released subsequent albums to fulfill their record contract with I.R.S. Records. Martin later recalled Forbidden as a "filler album that got the band out of the label deal, rid of the singer, and into the reunion. However I wasn't privy to that information at the time". I.R.S. Records released a compilation album in 1996 to fulfil the band's contract, entitled The Sabbath Stones, which featured songs from Born Again (1983) to Forbidden (1995).

Martin would also later hit out on Sabbath for being deleted from the band's history; "It seems a bit of a waste of ten years of the band's history. To cut that out, they're not just cutting me out, they're cutting themselves out. It seems like cutting your own nose off to spite your face. Why would you want to delete ten years of your history? It seems to me that they've got their minds elsewhere, and whatever brings them the most money seems to be what they go for. I mean, the Ozzy reunion. How many times do you want to go and pay to see them do the same stuff? OK, people argue that those old songs are people's favourites. Well; it's probably that way because you keep ramming it down people's throats and don't give them a chance to buy anything else. It seems disjointed and disconnected to me, and I don't understand why they would want to even cut themselves out of that history".

=== Solo and other collaborations (1998–2005) ===
After leaving Sabbath, Martin worked with a variety of projects, including Aldo Giuntini. With Dario Mollo, he released two further albums; The Cage in 1999 and The Cage 2. Martin also worked with Empire for their 2003 record Trading Souls.

Late in 2004, Tony let it be known that there would be a new solo album by him out in 2005. The album was recorded at Tony Martin's house, which is in Headless Cross in Redditch, Worcestershire England. The album featured again former Sabbath member Geoff Nicholls and some drum tracks from the late Cozy Powell. Martin explained; "I have recorded 2 tracks featuring the legendary drumming of Cozy Powell. How? well, when I fronted Cozy Powell's Hammer, he gave me 20 drumming tracks to write some songs with, I forgot I had them until I found them recently in the move to my new house."

=== Tony Martin's Headless Cross (2006-2019) and Kingdom of Madness (2019-present) ===
Tony Martin established Headless Cross in 2005 and would go on to tour Europe in 2006. The band also toured Brazil in 2008.

After Dio's passing in 2010, there was some speculation that he would either return to Black Sabbath or join the renamed Black Sabbath Heaven & Hell. Martin however ruled out ever working with Sabbath again stating: "Sabbath hasn’t talked to me in 15 years. All of the albums that I was on were removed from sale completely by them and it would take unbelievable changes to get it all back together". Black Sabbath was rejoined by Ozzy Osbourne in 2011 with the band's legal disputes apparently concluded.

Tony Martin's Headless Cross last performed at the Asylum in Birmingham, UK on 27 July 2012. This marked Martin's first ever UK show as a solo artist and first show with his new Headless Cross line-up. Martin stated in interviews that this would be his only live show of the year.

In January 2013 Martin signed to a new music publishing deal by Alan Bambrough of Sony/ATV Music Publishing Limited. Martin would be working on the fourth album Giuntini Project IV (2013) from Giuntini Project, the Italian heavy metal band started in 1988 by guitarist Aldo Giuntini as a solo project. This would be the third album Martin has appeared on. Martin would also appear on releases with Layla Milou and with Veronica Freeman, vocalist with Benedictum. Martin also sang on an album with Zele from Yugoslav/Bosnian rock legends Divlje Jagode.

In 2019, it was announced that Martin would front Kingdom of Madness, a band featuring former Magnum members Mark Stanway, Micky Barker and Richard Bailey performing material from Magnum's classic period. The COVID-19 crisis prevented the band from touring in 2020, with dates postponed till 2021.

On 14 January 2022 Martin released Thorns, his third solo album.

=== Reunion with Iommi and Black Sabbath re-releases ===
In January 2016 Martin announced on his Facebook page that he "was greeted by Tony Iommi VERY warmly" at the unveiling of the Cozy Powell memorial (also attended by Neil Murray) and that they may work together again. Shortly after Iommi himself announced his intention to work with Tony Martin again. Iommi said: "We've held back on the reissues because of the current Sabbath thing with Ozzy, but they will certainly be happening. I'd like to do a couple of new tracks for those releases [Headless Cross and Tyr] with Tony Martin. I'll also be looking at working on Cross Purposes and Forbidden."

In January 2024 Tony Iommi confirmed that the Martin-era box set was coming out in May 2024. The box set entitled Anno Domini 1989–1995 was finally released on 31 May 2024 and it includes four of five albums from the 1987–1997 Martin-era of the band, with Headless Cross (1989), Tyr (1990) and Cross Purposes (1994) all remastered, and Forbidden (1995) remixed by guitarist Tony Iommi.

== Personal life ==
In August 2015, Martin married his wife Carole.

== Discography ==
Date	Artist	Album	Notes
1987	Black Sabbath	The Eternal Idol	
1988	Forcefield	Forcefield II: The Talisman	
1989	Black Sabbath	Headless Cross	
1990	Black Sabbath	Tyr	
1992	Tony Martin (solo)	Back Where I Belong	
1993	Misha Calvin	Evolution	
1994	Black Sabbath	Cross Purposes	
1995	Black Sabbath	Cross Purposes Live	Live albums, VHS
1995	Black Sabbath	Forbidden	
1996	Black Sabbath	The Sabbath Stones	Compilations
1999	Dario Mollo / Tony Martin	The Cage	
1999	Giuntini Project	Giuntini Project II	
2002	Rondinelli	Our Cross, Our Sins	
2002	Dario Mollo / Tony Martin	The Cage 2	
2003	Empire	Trading Souls	
2003	M3	Classic 'Snake Live	
2005	Tony Martin (solo)	Scream	
2006	Empire	Raven Ride	
2006	Giuntini Project	Giuntini Project III	
2008	Mario Parga	Spirit of Night	Single
2009	Tony Martin (solo)	Who Put the Devil in Santa	Single
2012	Dario Mollo / Tony Martin	The Third Cage	
2012	Silver Horses	Silver Horses	
2013	Giuntini Project	Giuntini Project IV	
2022	Tony Martin (solo)	Thorns	
2024	Black Sabbath	Anno Domini 1989–1995	

=== Guest appearances ===
Date	Artist	Album	Song	Notes
2006	Phenomena	Psychofantasy	"God Forgives"	
2007	Candlemass	Candlemass 20 Year Anniversary		DVD
2009	Various	Voices of Rock: High & Mighty	"Into The Night"	
2010	Candlemass	Doomology	"Witches"	Tony Martin vocals recorded October 2004
2010	Phenomena	Blind Faith	"Liar"	
2010	Star One	Victims of the Modern Age	"Closer to the Stars"	
2011	Arrayan Path	Ira Imperium	"Ira Imperium (The Damned)"	
2011	Black Widow	Sleeping With Demons	"Hail Satan"	
2011	Wolfpakk	Wolfpakk	"Ride The Bullet"	
2012	Layla Milou	Reborn	"Bloody Valentine"	
2013	Benedictum	Obey	"Cry"	
2013	Schubert In Rock	Schubert In Rock	"Second King Of Darkness"; "Youg Free And Deadly"	
2013	Herman Rarebell & Friends	Acoustic Fever	"Another Piece of Meat"	
2015	Lazy Bonez	Alive	"Racing Heart"	
2015	Magnus Karlsson's Free Fall	Kingdom of Rock	"When The Sky Falls"	
2015	Sebastien	Dark Chambers of Déjà Vu	"Lamb of God"	
2015	The V	Now Or Never	"King For A Day"	
2016	Feanor	We Are Heavy Metal	"Crying Games"	
2016	Lightning Strikes	Lightning Strikes	"Death Valley"; "301 AD Sins of Our Fathers"	
2016	Magnus Rosén	The World Changes	"The Castle of Imagination"	Harmonizing
2016	Violet Janine	So Much More	"So Much More"	
2016	Zele Lipovača	Internal Waves of Love	"Missing You"	
2016	ZiX	Tides of the final war	"Metal Strike All star song"	
2017	Silver Horses	Tick	"Hang My Head In Shame"; "My Bad"	
2020	Magnus Karlsson's Free Fall	We Are The Night	"Temples & Towers"; "Far From Over"	
2021	Secret Society feat. Tony Martin		"Darkest Hour"	
2021	Giuntini Deathline	V	"Stab in the dark"	
2021	The Sonic Overlords	Last days of Babylon	"Past the end of time"	
2022	Star One	Revel in Time	"Lost Children of the Universe"	
2022	Quartz	On the Edge Of No Tomorrow	"Evil Lies"	
2024	Paul Di'Anno	The Book of the Beast		
