= Empire (German band) =

British-German metal band

- Origin: Germany/England
- Genres: Hard rock, heavy metal
- Years active: 2000-present
- Labels: Lion, Frontiers
- Members: Rolf Munkes; Neil Murray; André Hilgers; Doogie White
- Past members: Lance King; Gerald Kloos; Tony Martin; Don Airey

Empire is a British-German heavy metal band founded in 2000 by former Majesty guitarist, Rolf Munkes.

Munkes was joined by bassist Neil Murray, singer Lance King and drummer Gerald Kloos. The band recorded their first album Hypnotica in 2001.

In 2003, Munkes published another album, with the addition of ex-Black Sabbath singer Tony Martin on vocals and keyboardist Don Airey. The album was called Trading Souls. Airey left the band before the recording of the third Empire album, The Raven Ride (2006). With the exception of Airey and the new drummer André Hilgers, the line up of the band was identical to Trading Souls. For the 2007 album Chasing Shadows, Munkes employed a new singer, Doogie White.

== Members ==
Current members

- Rolf Munkes - guitars (2000–present)
- Neil Murray - bass (2000–present)
- André Hilgers - drums (2006–present)
- Doogie White - vocals (2007–present)

Former members

- Lance King - vocals (2000–2003)
- Gerald Kloos - drums (2000–2006)
- Tony Martin - vocals (2003–2007)
- Don Airey - keyboards (2003–2006)

== Discography ==
- Hypnotica (2001)
- Trading Souls (2003)
- The Raven Ride (2006)
- Chasing Shadows (2007)
