= The Last Supper (Black Sabbath video) =

Video by Black Sabbath
- Released: 1 November 1999
- Recorded: 1999
- Genre: Heavy metal
- Length: 120:00
- Label: Sony
- Producer: Jeb Brien

Black Sabbath video chronology
Cross Purposes Live (1995)	The Last Supper (1999)	Inside Black Sabbath – 1970–1992 (2004)

The Last Supper is a VHS/DVD by the English heavy metal band Black Sabbath in their original line-up. It features the live shows they put on stage on their US tour in 1999. This video has received negative criticism by fans for having interview segments interrupt the live footage. These segments were conducted by Henry Rollins, of Black Flag and the Rollins Band.

Professional ratings
Review scores
Source	Rating
Allmusic	link

== Track listing ==
No.	Title	Length
1.	"War Pigs"
2.	"N.I.B."
3.	"Electric Funeral"
4.	"Fairies Wear Boots"
5.	"Into the Void"
6.	"Sweet Leaf"
7.	"Snowblind"
8.	"After Forever"
9.	"Dirty Women"
10.	"Black Sabbath"
11.	"Iron Man"
12.	"Children of the Grave"
13.	"Paranoid"

== Personnel ==
- Tony Iommi - guitars
- Geezer Butler - bass guitar
- Bill Ward - drums
- Ozzy Osbourne - vocals
- Geoff Nicholls - keyboards

== Charts ==
Chart (1999)	Peak position
UK Music Videos (Official Charts)	14

== Certifications ==
Region	Certification	Certified units/sales
United Kingdom (BPI)	Gold	25,000^{^}
^{^} Shipments figures based on certification alone.
