= Forbidden (Black Sabbath album) =

- Cover art by Paul Sample

Studio album by Black Sabbath
- Released: 5 June 1995
- Recorded: 4 December 1994 – March 1995
- Studios: Parr Street (Liverpool, England); Devonshire Sound (Los Angeles, California)
- Genre: Heavy metal
- Length: 44:10
- Label: I.R.S.
- Producer: Ernie C

Black Sabbath chronology
Cross Purposes Live (1995)	Forbidden (1995)	The Sabbath Stones (1996)

Alternative cover
- 2024 Tony Iommi remix

Forbidden is the eighteenth studio album by the English heavy metal band Black Sabbath, released on 5 June 1995, through I.R.S. Records, and on 20 June in the US. This recording saw the reunion of Black Sabbath's Tyr-era line-up from 1990, with the return of Neil Murray and Cozy Powell. It was the last album to feature Tony Martin on vocals and Geoff Nicholls on keyboards, and the last by the band until 2013 when Ozzy Osbourne and Geezer Butler returned for the album 13. The album sold 21,000 copies in the US in its first week and as of 2013, Forbidden has sold 191,000 copies in the US. Part way into the Forbidden tour, Cozy Powell left the band for the last time and was replaced by Bobby Rondinelli, who played drums on Cross Purposes.

The album received a generally negative response from critics and fans alike. After its release, the band underwent several line-up changes and found itself at a career crossroads. However, original Black Sabbath vocalist Ozzy Osbourne reconciled with guitarist Tony Iommi not long afterwards. It was re-released with a new remix in 2024 as part of the Anno Domini 1989–1995 box set, and then later on as an individual release.

== Background and recording ==
Forbidden followed lineup changes in the band: Geezer Butler was replaced by Neil Murray and Cozy Powell returned in the immediate aftermath of 1994's Cross Purposes tour. Writing and rehearsals took place at Bluestone Farm in Wales, ahead of recording at Parr Street Studios, Liverpool, in December 1994. According to a July 1995 interview by Tony Iommi for the Boston radio station WBCN, the album took ten days to record. It was launched in June 1995.

Musically, the release draws on traditional heavy metal and influences from blues. Ernie C of the rap metal band Body Count produced, recorded and mixed the album. The opening track, "The Illusion of Power", features Body Count member Ice-T delivering a spoken word part during the bridge.

"We were pushed into a corner," explained Tony Iommi. "Somebody at the record company suggested we work with Ice-T. My reaction was, 'Who the hell is he?' But we met up and he was a nice bloke, and also a big fan of Sabbath. Ernie C ended up producing Forbidden, which was a terrible mistake. Ernie tried to get Cozy Powell to play these hip-hop-style drum parts, which quite rightly offended him. You don't tell Cozy Powell how to play drums."

== Reception and legacy ==
Professional ratings
Review scores
Source	Rating
AllMusic	1.5/5 stars
Classic Rock	2.5/5 stars
The Rolling Stone Album Guide	1/5 stars
Blender	1/5 stars

Forbidden was panned by critics upon its release. AllMusic's Bradley Torreano gave the album only one and a half stars, remarking that "with boring songs, awful production, and uninspired performances, this is easily avoidable for all but the most enthusiastic fan". He also stated that he considered it a "sad state of affairs" given the band's long history. Blender magazine called Forbidden "an embarrassment ... the band's worst album".

Band members have since spoken about their mixed opinions of the album. Vocalist Tony Martin made known his feelings in an interview in July 2011, during which he stated: "Well, Forbidden is... I want to say 'crap', but it's actually not". He added that he thought the songs worked in rehearsals, but other factors, such as rumours of a reunion of the original Black Sabbath line-up and the record company wanting to "take [the album] and see what Ice-T wanted to do", gave the album a "distinct ill feeling". Martin also maintained that he never believed a "Run-D.M.C. type"/"Rap Sabbath" album would work. Rob Zombie gave some lighter praise at the launch, stating "There is one easy way to figure out the lasting power of Black Sabbath. There's always certain bands that get a great reaction and Black Sabbath is always one of them." In regards to the subsequent original line-up reunion, Martin has also said Forbidden was a "filler album that got the band out of the label deal, rid of the singer, and into the reunion", but remarked that he "wasn't privy to that information at the time".

Guitarist Tony Iommi has admitted to Sabbath fanzine Southern Cross that he was "not happy" with Forbidden. He elaborated by saying, "We brought in Ernie C to do production, which was a bit difficult really, because I had to leave him to it… One of the problems was we weren't all there at the same time, when we were writing it. Cozy and Neil were still contracted to do other stuff, so it ended up with just Tony Martin, Geoff Nicholls and myself just jamming around and putting ideas down. It all came together very quickly and we didn't have time to reflect: make sure it was the right songs and the right way of doing it." Iommi reiterated his dissatisfaction with the album to the Birmingham Mail newspaper.

In 2019, Ernie C defended his production in Forbidden, saying it was a "cool and fun experience." It was his goal to "dry" the band's sound up a little bit and make it "more personal," meaning to amplify the music so it did not sound like "you're playing in a tunnel." He recalled that Iommi approached both him and Ice-T in England to record their new album after listening to a demo of "War Pigs" that Body Count had made. It was also Ernie's idea to get Ice-T to rap in "The Illusion of Power."

== Remix ==
On 4 March 2016, Iommi discussed future re-releases of the Tony Martin-era catalogue. He explained: "We've held back on the reissues of those albums because of the current Sabbath thing with Ozzy Osbourne, but they will certainly be happening... I'd like to do a couple of new tracks for those releases with Tony Martin... I'll also be looking at working on Cross Purposes and Forbidden." In 2019, Iommi said he was working on a remix of Forbidden "on and off" with Mike Exeter.

On 14 May 2020, during an interview with Eddie Trunk, Iommi revealed that the remix of the album was complete and he was just waiting for "the right time" to re-release the album.

In January 2024 Tony Iommi confirmed that a box set of the Tony Martin albums was coming out in May 2024.

On 22 March 2024, the box set Anno Domini 1989–1995 was announced, collecting the four albums recorded with Tony Martin released under IRS Records. The box set, which was released on 31 May 2024, contains a full remix of Forbidden by Tony Iommi. Additionally, the CD edition of the album includes the Japanese bonus track "Loser Gets It All'". The bonus track is also included on the individual CD version of the remixed album, released on November 15th, 2024.

== Track listing ==
All lyrics are written by Tony Martin, except "The Illusion of Power" by Martin and Ice-T; all music is composed by Black Sabbath.

Standard Edition
No.	Title	Length
1.	"The Illusion of Power" (featuring Ice-T)	4:51
2.	"Get a Grip"	3:58
3.	"Can't Get Close Enough"	4:27
4.	"Shaking Off the Chains"	4:02
5.	"I Won't Cry for You"	4:47
6.	"Guilty as Hell"	3:27
7.	"Sick and Tired"	3:29
8.	"Rusty Angels"	5:00
9.	"Forbidden"	3:47
10.	"Kiss of Death"	6:06

Japanese Edition / 2024 Remix Bonus Track
No.	Title	Length
11.	"Loser Gets It All"	2:55

== Personnel ==
Black Sabbath

- Tony Iommi – guitars
- Tony Martin – vocals
- Cozy Powell – drums
- Neil Murray – bass
- Geoff Nicholls – keyboards

Additional musician

- Ice-T – additional vocals on "The Illusion of Power"

Production

- Ernie C – producer, engineer, mixing at Ridge Farm Studio, UK
- Bobby Brooks – engineer, mixing
- Andrea Wright, Phill Luff – assistant engineers
- Geoff Pesche – mastering at Townhouse Studios, London

2024 Remix

- Tony Iommi – New remix
- Mike Exeter – Remix engineer

== Charts ==
Chart (1995)	Peak position
Australian Albums (ARIA)	154
Austrian Albums (Ö3 Austria)	40
Dutch Albums (Album Top 100)	86
European Albums Chart	62
Finnish Albums (The Official Finnish Charts)	12
German Albums (Offizielle Top 100)	35
Japanese Albums (Oricon)	45
Swedish Albums (Sverigetopplistan)	19
Swiss Albums (Schweizer Hitparade)	48
UK Albums (Official Charts)	71
UK Rock & Metal Albums (Official Charts)	6

Chart (2025)	Peak position
Greek Albums (IFPI)	77

Chart (2026)	Peak position
French Physical Albums (SNEP)	168
French Rock & Metal Albums (SNEP)	64
