= The Sabbath Collection =

Compilation album by Black Sabbath
- Released: 1 November 1985
- Genre: Heavy metal
- Label: Castle Communications
- Producers: Black Sabbath; Mike Butcher

Black Sabbath chronology
Born Again (1983)	The Sabbath Collection (1985)	Seventh Star (1986)

The Sabbath Collection is a compilation album released in 1985 by the English heavy metal band Black Sabbath. The album was released without the consent of the band, and is therefore considered "unofficial". There are some mistakes with the track listing; "Sleeping Village" and "Warning"'s track length listings were inverted, giving Sleeping Village a length of 10:47 and Warning a length of 3:30. There is also a misspelling of "Sabbra Cadabra".

== Track listing ==
1. Paranoid - 2:48 (Iommi, Ward, Butler, Osbourne/Westminster Music Ltd.)
2. Behind The Wall Of Sleep - 4:20 (Iommi, Ward, Butler, Osbourne/Westminster Music Ltd.)
3. Sleeping Village - 3:30 (Iommi, Ward, Butler, Osbourne/Westminster Music Ltd.)
4. Warning - 10:47 (Dunbar/Getaway Songs)
5. After Forever - 5:25 (Iommi/Westminster Music Ltd.)
6. Supernaut - 4:40 (Iommi, Ward, Butler, Osbourne/Westminster Music Ltd.)
7. St. Vitus Dance - 2:25 (Iommi, Ward, Butler, Osbourne/Westminster Music Ltd.)
8. Snowblind - 5:27 (Iommi, Ward, Butler, Osbourne/Westminster Music Ltd.)
9. Killing Yourself To Live - 5:40 (Black Sabbath/Westminster Music Ltd.)
10. Sabbra Cadabra - 5:56 (Black Sabbath/Westminster Music Ltd.)
  * (Spelled "Sabra Cabadra" on back cover of the album.)
11. The Writ - 7:46 (Black Sabbath/Westminster Music Ltd.)

== Credits ==
- Songs 1, 2, 3, 4, & 5 produced by Rodger Bain for Tony Hall Enterprises
- Songs 6, 7, 8 & 8 produced by Patrick Meehan & Black Sabbath
- Songs 9, & 10 produced by Black Sabbath for Excellency Production
- Song 11 produced by Black Sabbath with Mike Butcher

== Charts ==
Chart (2002)	Peak position
UK Independent Albums (Official Charts)	39
UK Rock & Metal Albums (Official Charts)	40

== Certifications ==
Region	Certification	Certified units/sales
United Kingdom (BPI)	Gold	100,000^{^}
^{^} Shipments figures based on certification alone.
