= Heaven and Hell (Black Sabbath song) =

Song by Black Sabbath

from the album Heaven and Hell
- Released: 18 April 1980
- Recorded: October 1979
- Studio: Criteria Recording, Miami, Florida; Studio Ferber, Paris
- Genre: Heavy metal
- Length: 7:00
- Label: Warner Bros.
- Composers: Ronnie James Dio; Tony Iommi; Geezer Butler; Bill Ward
- Lyricist: Ronnie James Dio
- Producer: Martin Birch

Audio sample
- file; help

"Heaven and Hell" is the title track of Black Sabbath's ninth studio album. The music was primarily written by guitarist Tony Iommi, but as with almost all Sabbath albums, credit is given to the entire band. The lyrics were entirely written by newcomer Ronnie James Dio.

The song has been performed by several bands of which Iommi and Dio were members including Black Sabbath, Dio, and Heaven & Hell.

== Details ==
Keyboardist Geoff Nicholls, who was a session keyboard player during the recording of the album, is said to have been responsible for this song's bassline. The bassline closely resembles that of "Mainline Riders" by Quartz, of which Nicholls was a former member. Geezer Butler was not available during initial recording of the song in late 1979.

Performed live by Black Sabbath, Dio and Heaven & Hell, the song was often stretched out with an extended guitar solo, audience participation, ad-libbed lyrics, or additional lyrics regarding angelic and demonic apparitions and personal judgment.

Many later Sabbath lineups included this song in live sets, during which it was variously sung by Ian Gillan, Glenn Hughes, Ray Gillen, and Tony Martin. An official live recording, featuring Martin on vocals, featured on 1995's Cross Purposes Live. Judas Priest frontman Rob Halford sang the song with Sabbath on 14 and 15 November 1992, when he filled in at two concerts.

"Heaven and Hell" was ranked No. 11 in Martin Popoff's book The Top 500 Heavy Metal Songs of All Time. Popoff compiled the book by asking thousands of fans, musicians, and journalists to nominated their favourite metal songs. Almost 18,000 individual votes were tallied and entered into a database from which the final rankings were derived.

The song was named the 81st best hard rock song of all time by VH1. It was ranked the eighth best Black Sabbath song by Rock - Das Gesamtwerk der größten Rock-Acts im Check. In 2020, Kerrang ranked the song number three on their list of the 20 greatest Black Sabbath songs, and in 2021, Louder Sound ranked the song number two on their list of the 40 greatest Black Sabbath songs.

The song's intro was used during The Freddie Mercury Tribute Concert to introduce Tony Iommi.

== Lyrics ==
"That song was a chance for me to get all these things off my chest that I always wanted to say… It was a song that let me say the one statement that was most important to me. I've always felt to be somewhat of a spokesman for kids – for people who maybe lonely, looked down upon, because they like the wrong kind of music – and, more importantly, the kids who play in bands. So I made the statement that I always wanted to make, which is, 'The world is full of kings and queens, who blind your eyes then steal your dreams / It's heaven and hell.' And that all means beware of people who try to blind your eyes with promises… If you have those dreams, don't let anyone rob you of those wonderful ideas that you have by stealing them and putting them in their pocket, and leaving you lonely by the side of the road. So beware those kings and queens out there, who blind your eyes then steal your dreams. It was very important for me to be able to make that statement. And that statement has been something that I've tried to live with since that time." – Ronnie James Dio

In an interview for VH1's "Heavy: The Story of Metal", Dio stated that the song is about the ability of each human being to choose between doing good and doing evil; essentially, that each person has "heaven and hell" inside themselves.
