= Tyr (album) =

1990 album by Black Sabbath

Studio album by Black Sabbath
- Released: 20 August 1990
- Recorded: February–June 1990
- Studios: Rockfield (Rockfield, Wales); Woodcray (Berkshire, England)
- Genre: Heavy metal
- Length: 39:10
- Label: I.R.S.
- Producers: Tony Iommi; Cozy Powell

Black Sabbath chronology
Headless Cross (1989)	Tyr (1990)	The Ozzy Osbourne Years (1991)

Singles from Tyr
- 1. "Feels Good to Me" Released: 10 September 1990

Professional ratings
Review scores
Source	Rating
AllMusic	3/5 stars
The Rolling Stone Album Guide	1/5 stars

Tyr (/ˈtɪər/) (stylized as ᛏᛉᚱ) is the fifteenth studio album by the English heavy metal band Black Sabbath, released on 20 August 1990 by I.R.S. Records in the United Kingdom, and on 4 September in the United States.

The album title, and several song titles, allude to Norse mythology, which led many to call Tyr a concept album, although bassist Neil Murray dispelled that in 2005, stating that while many of the songs may seem loosely related, very little of the album has to do with mythology and it was not intended to be a concept recording.

In 2024, a remaster of the album was announced as part of the box set Anno Domini 1989–1995, marking the first time the album has been officially reissued. The 2024 remaster was also released as a stand alone CD and vinyl on 15 November 2024.

== Album information ==
The album’s departure from the darker lyrics of Headless Cross was discussed by Tony Iommi in his 2012 autobiography Iron Man: “For our next album, Tyr, we went back to the Woodcray Studios in February 1990, with me and Cozy producing it again. On Headless Cross, Tony Martin had just come into the band and he assumed, oh, Black Sabbath, it’s all about the Devil, so his lyrics were full of the Devil and Satan. It was too much in your face. We told him to be a bit more subtle about it, so for Tyr he did all these lyrics about Nordic gods and whatnot. It took me a while to get my head around that.” The album was originally intended to be titled Satanic Verses but Tyr was chosen instead to disassociate it from the dark themes of the previous album.

This album represents possibly the most dramatic departure from Black Sabbath’s traditional sound, with only traces of it found in the occasional riff. The production has been criticised by some (who claim Cozy Powell’s drums drown out most of the other instruments) and praised by others (who note that this is one of Sabbath’s heaviest albums and perhaps the most prominently reliant on keyboards by the perennial fifth member, Geoff Nicholls).

The band have stated that while they do not disown or regret the song "Feels Good to Me", it was put on the album solely to be released as a single and does not fit in musically with the rest of the record. It was also played once, on the first show of the tour on September 1, 1990. The Tyr tour never made it beyond UK & Europe and consisted of around 50 shows total.

Geezer Butler, Ian Gillan and Brian May made guest appearances on the European leg of the Tyr tour; Butler and May appearing during the encore of the show performed on 8 September 1990 at the Hammersmith Odeon in London.

In Norse mythology, Týr is the god of single combat and heroic glory, and the son of Odin. The runes on the cover, ᛏ, ᛉ, and ᚱ are taken from the Rök runestone in Sweden. The middle rune, algiz, is transcribed as the modern letter x or z, not y.

== Legacy ==
The only track to feature on post-Tyr tours was "Anno Mundi", e.g. on the Cross Purposes Live VHS/DVD. Tony Martin re-recorded "Jerusalem" for his 1992 solo album Back Where I Belong. The Black Sabbath line-up that recorded Tyr would reunite to record their eighteenth studio album, Forbidden, in 1995. Frontman Heri Joensen of Viking metal band Týr claims to have been influenced by the album cover when designing his own band’s logo.

== Track listing ==
All lyrics are written by Tony Martin; all music is composed by Tony Iommi, Tony Martin, Cozy Powell, Neil Murray, Geoff Nicholls.

Standard edition
No.	Title	Length
1.	"Anno Mundi"	6:12
2.	"The Law Maker"	3:53
3.	"Jerusalem"	3:59
4.	"The Sabbath Stones"	6:46
5.	"The Battle of Tyr" (instrumental)	1:08
6.	"Odin’s Court"	2:42
7.	"Valhalla"	4:41
8.	"Feels Good to Me"	5:44
9.	"Heaven in Black"	4:05
Total length:		39:10

“Feels Good to Me” maxi single
No.	Title	Length
1.	"Feels Good to Me (Edit)"	4:41
2.	"Heaven and Hell (Live)"	9:44
3.	"Paranoid (Live)"	4:13

The live tracks on this single were recorded at the Olimpiski Hall in Moscow, Soviet Union, in November 1989.

== Personnel ==
Black Sabbath

- Tony Iommi – guitars, production
- Cozy Powell – drums, production
- Tony Martin – vocals
- Neil Murray – bass

Additional musician

- Geoff Nicholls – keyboards

Technical personnel

- Sean Lynch – engineering
- Leif Mases – mixing
- Tony Cousins – mastering

== Release history ==
Region	Date	Label(s)	Format(s)	Edition(s)	Ref.
Europe	20 August 1990	I.R.S.	CD; cassette; LP; picture disc	Standard	
North America	4 September 1990	I.R.S.	CD; cassette; LP	Standard	
Japan	5 September 1990	I.R.S.	CD	Standard	
Europe	September 1999	EMI; I.R.S.; Classic Rock	CD	Reissue	
Europe	31 May 2024	Bluefame Ltd.; BMG	CD; LP	Anno Domini 1989-1995 reissue	
North America	31 May 2024	Warner; Rhino	CD; LP	Anno Domini 1989-1995 reissue	
Europe	15 November 2024	Bluefame Ltd.; BMG	CD; LP	Standalone reissue	
North America	15 November 2024	Warner; Rhino	CD; LP	Standalone reissue	

== Charts ==
Chart (1990)	Peak position
Australian Albums (ARIA)	143
Austrian Albums (Ö3 Austria)	24
Dutch Albums (Album Top 100)	77
European Albums Chart	27
Finnish Albums (The Official Finnish Charts)	15
German Albums (Offizielle Top 100)	12
Japanese Albums (Oricon)	57
Swedish Albums (Sverigetopplistan)	24
Swiss Albums (Schweizer Hitparade)	24
UK Albums (Official Charts)	24

Chart (2025)	Peak position
Greek Albums (IFPI)	14

Chart (2026)	Peak position
French Physical Albums (SNEP)	162
French Rock & Metal Albums (SNEP)	62
