= The Black Sabbath Story, Vol. 2 =

The Black Sabbath Story Vol. 2 – 1978–1992

Video by Black Sabbath
- Released: VHS – 1992; DVD – 2002
- Genre: Heavy metal
- Length: VHS 53 min; DVD 72 min
- Label: Sanctuary

Black Sabbath video chronology
The Black Sabbath Story Vol. 1 – 1970–1978 (1991)	The Black Sabbath Story Vol. 2 – 1978–1992 (1992)	Cross Purposes Live (1995)

Professional ratings
Review scores
Source	Rating
AllMusic	3/5 stars

The Black Sabbath Story Vol. 2 – 1978–1992 is a documentary video about the biography of the English heavy metal band Black Sabbath. It is the follow-up to The Black Sabbath Story Vol. 1 – 1970–1978, and it's about their story from the leaving of Ozzy Osbourne to the recording of Dehumanizer, discussing the line-up changes Black Sabbath experienced during the period between 1978 and 1992. In addition to comments by the storic members Geezer Butler and Tony Iommi, there are interviews with other people that have been in the band, like Ronnie James Dio, Ian Gillan, Cozy Powell and Vinny Appice. There are also live clips and video clips of various songs. In 2002 a DVD Version has been released, with 19 min of never-seen footage, not included in the previous VHS Version.

== Tracks ==
VHS

1. "A Hard Road"
2. "Die Young"
3. "Neon Knights"
4. "Trashed"
5. "Zero the Hero"
6. "No Stranger to Love"
7. "The Shining"
8. "Headless Cross"
9. "Feels Good to Me"
10. "T.V. Crimes"
11. "Computer God"
12. "I" (Exclusive Live Footage)

DVD

1. "Die Young"
2. "Neon Knights"
3. "Trashed"
4. "Zero the Hero"
5. "No Stranger to Love"
6. "The Shining"
7. "Headless Cross"
8. "Feels Good to Me"
9. "T.V. Crimes"

== Certifications ==
Region	Certification	Certified units/sales
United States (RIAA)	Gold	50,000^{^}
^{^} Shipments figures based on certification alone.
