= Headless Cross (album) =

1989 album by Black Sabbath

Studio album by Black Sabbath
- Released: 17 April 1989
- Recorded: August–November 1988
- Studios: The Soundmill (Leeds, England); Woodcray Studios (Berkshire, England); Amazon Studios (Liverpool, England)
- Genre: Heavy metal
- Length: 40:13
- Label: I.R.S.
- Producers: Tony Iommi; Cozy Powell

Black Sabbath chronology
The Eternal Idol (1987)	Headless Cross (1989)	Tyr (1990)

Singles from Headless Cross
- 1. "Headless Cross" Released: 3 April 1989; 2. "Devil & Daughter" Released: 26 June 1989 (UK); 3. "Call of the Wild" Released: 1989 (EU)

Alternative cover
- Black and white album cover, released in the UK.

Headless Cross is the fourteenth studio album by the English heavy metal band Black Sabbath through I.R.S. Records, released on 17 April 1989 internationally, and on 7 June in Japan. This was their first I.R.S release, after having being dropped from both Warner Bros. and Vertigo labels as the commercial popularity of the band continued to decline at that time, in response to the poor sales of their previous release, The Eternal Idol (1987). The group took a break in 1988 to record their upcoming project and hired new members of Black Sabbath. Guitarist Tony Iommi self-produced the album for first time since 1982, siding with newly recruited drummer Cozy Powell. It is the band's second album with lead vocalist Tony Martin.

The album received a rave response from music critics. Headless Cross continues to feature a darker approach of their sound, referring to elements such as satanism, the occult, and mentions of death. It peaked at number 31 in the group's native UK, but charted at number 115 in the US. It made a chart improvement in both positions unlike The Eternal Idol, which had failed to reach within the top 40 in the UK. Headless Cross received a reissue in 2024, being featured in the Anno Domini 1989–1995 boxset, which contained recordings that featured Martin on vocals.

== Background ==
In 1987, Black Sabbath was forced to find a replacement for vocalist Ray Gillen who had left the group after he had initially recorded tracks for The Eternal Idol. Vocalist Tony Martin, who previously had short-lived ventures with bands such as Orion, Alliance, and Tobruk, was recruited and was featured on that album in place of Gillen. After its release, the band was dropped from both Warner Bros. and Vertigo Records due to its poor sales performance. Coinciding with the band's recent commercial decline, which included the US, Tony Iommi was keen on finding a new record label. He met I.R.S. Records owner and executive Miles Copeland, who persuaded him to sign with the label. Copeland told Iommi, "You know how to write albums, you know what people want. You do it and I'm fine with it."

Bringing Martin in for rehearsals, Iommi asked British drummer Cozy Powell – who had heavily been involved playing with Jeff Beck, Rainbow, MSG, Whitesnake, and recently Phenomena – to join Black Sabbath. Powell later remarked that the group had hit rock bottom when he was asked to join, and he was quoted as saying, "because of the band's debts and the press's bullshit, many would have considered joining a risk, but I decided to accept the challenge." Iommi and Powell had also considered dropping the Black Sabbath name and reforming the band under a different name, but the two decided to continue recording under the name Black Sabbath. The trio commenced writing sessions for Sabbath's upcoming album followed by a rehearsing session. Longtime keyboardist Geoff Nicholls also joined them for rehearsals. Iommi received word from Gloria Butler, wife and manager of Geezer Butler, that he wanted to rejoin the group, but he later opted to join Black Sabbath's former bandmate Ozzy Osbourne's band in support for the No Rest for the Wicked touring lineup. Initially, Iommi and Nicholls questioned whether to bring Ronnie James Dio back or ask David Coverdale again to join the group. However, Powell convinced the two to keep Martin on, given that he departed Whitesnake in 1985 due to a deteriorating working relationship with Coverdale.

== Recording and production ==
Powell and Iommi produced the album themselves. Due to Jo Burt's exit early in the sessions, Laurence Cottle played bass as a session musician rather than an official member. He appeared in the video for the title track, but was not featured in promotional photos. For the tour, the lineup was completed by Whitesnake and Gary Moore bassist Neil Murray.

Conceptually, the lyrics have predominantly occult and Satanic elements; arguably the only time in the band's career where an entire album is based on such ideas rather than select songs.

The opening track, "The Gates of Hell" starts off as grim instrumental, followed by the title track that is mainly derived on Powell's drumming intro and Iommi's riff, similar to the track "Heaven and Hell".

"When Death Calls" has a guitar solo by Queen guitarist Brian May.

Two songs had their titles changed due to Ozzy Osbourne releasing songs with the same titles on his album No Rest for the Wicked. "Call of the Wild" was originally titled "Hero", and "Devil & Daughter" was originally titled "Devil's Daughter".

"Call of the Wild" and "Devil & Daughter" are also the only songs that do not end with a slow fade out with vocal ad libs by Tony Martin; while "Nightwing" does have a fade out, it does not feature any vocal ad libs. According to Martin, the vocals on "Nightwing" were the original guide vocals, because Iommi thought they sounded better than later recordings.

"'Black Moon' was written with Tony Iommi, Geoff Nicholls, Eric Singer and Dave Spitz," noted Martin. "They were left with one track that had no voice on it, and Tony asked me if I could sing something on it. I wrote and sang the lyrics in one day! We never played it [live] because there are too many Sabbath favourites."

== Title and artwork ==
The album's title was inspired by a village in Worcestershire, where Martin was living at that time. Having knowledge of that area, Martin suggested that name was "basically about the people and their belief in the cross... hang crosses in those houses and around their neck... because they all died of a disease, we called it the plague."

The cover image was illustrated by Kevin Wimlett, while Flat Earth design agency handled the album sleeve. In general, the cover of Headless Cross depicted a large sized stone cross towering over a small village with a partly cloudy moon. Upon release, the sleeve was in black and white exclusively in the UK, while multiple releases outside the country would receive a slightly saturated version. The 2024 reissue restores the saturation that is currently in its physical and digital formats.

== Touring ==
The Headless Cross tour started in the summer of 1989 with a brief run of 10 shows in North America with Kingdom Come and Silent Rage opening. Further planned dates ended up being cancelled. In September the band played 10 more dates in the UK and continued to mainland Europe ending in Germany in early October. Ian Gillan joined the band for encores at two shows including Copenhagen. The same month they played six shows in Japan and finished the tour in the USSR in November - December. December dates in Poland, Czechoslovakia and East Germany were tentatively scheduled but did not materialize due to political unrest in the then-Communist states.

For the live show in support of this album, "Ave Satani", the main theme from Jerry Goldsmith's Oscar-winning soundtrack for The Omen, was used as the intro tape, beginning as the house lights went down. This would then segue into a taped recording of "The Gates of Hell" before the band would begin the show with "Headless Cross". The intro-tape of "Ave Satani/The Gates of Hell" was used many times, during various tours over the years, up until the Reunion shows. "Headless Cross" would be played on all subsequent tours when Tony Martin was in the band but the only other track from the "Headless Cross" album to last beyond that tour was "When Death Calls".

Black Sabbath were one of the first bands to tour Russia, in 1989, after Mikhail Gorbachev opened the country to western acts. Black Sabbath played a total of 25 shows, 13 at Moscow's Olympic Hall and 12 at EKS Hall in Leningrad. The two (afternoon/evening) 25 November shows were professionally filmed and eventually released on DVD in some territories in 2008. Two songs from the Moscow shows were also released as b-sides to the "Feels Good to Me" single in 1990.

Tony Martin currently tours with a live band named after the album, going by the name of "Tony Martin's Headless Cross". They included another former Black Sabbath member, Geoff Nicholls, until his death in 2017.

== Singles ==
- "Headless Cross" yielded two radio singles, an edit of the title track and "Devil & Daughter". The former was available as a 7", personally signed by Iommi, and a 12" poster-sleeve, this latter being limited to 2,500 copies.
- "Devil & Daughter" was released as a 7" picture disc, a 12 picture-sleeve, and a 7" box-set, containing the single, some postcards and a stencil of the band's logo.
- "Black Moon" was originally a B-side on "The Shining" single, re-recorded for Headless Cross and released to radio to promote the US tour.

The bonus track "Cloak and Dagger" was the B-side to the "Headless Cross" single, and was later on the vinyl picture disc edition. At the time of the album's release, the only CD versions of the "Headless Cross" edit and of "Cloak and Dagger" were on separate promotional CDs.

== Reception ==
Professional ratings
Review scores
Source	Rating
AllMusic	4/5 stars
Kerrang!	4/5 stars
Martin Popoff	7/10
Rock Hard	8/10
The Rolling Stone Album Guide	2/5 stars

Headless Cross was praised by critics and fans as the best Sabbath album in years. Said AllMusic's Eduardo Rivadavia: "Arguably the finest Black Sabbath album since Ozzy or Dio, Headless Cross also featured one of Black Sabbath's most formidable lineups... In short, for those wise enough to appreciate Black Sabbath's discography beyond the Osbourne and Dio essentials, there can be no better place to start than Headless Cross or its worthy predecessor, The Eternal Idol".

The album spent eight weeks on the Billboard 200 chart, peaking at number 115. Sales in the US were low, leading to the curtailment of the tour. Iommi told Sabbath fanzine Southern Cross: "When we had the first record out with I.R.S., Cozy and myself went into record stores in Toronto, Canada, where we are pretty big. Nobody could get the record, it wasn't in the shops... unbelievable. We had such a fight with the local rep. I really came close to chinning him – it really was that bad. At the end of the day, it's us that suffer. They say, 'Oh, it didn't sell.' How can it sell if you haven't got the record in the shops?"

In 2005, the album was ranked number 403 in Rock Hard magazine's book The 500 Greatest Rock & Metal Albums of All Time.

In 2021, Kerrang! ranked Headless Cross as the seventh-best Black Sabbath album in a best-to-worst ranking of the band's discography.

== Track listing ==
All tracks are written by Tony Iommi, Tony Martin, Cozy Powell and Geoff Nicholls, except where noted.

No.	Title	Writer(s)	Length
1.	"The Gates of Hell" (instrumental)		1:06
2.	"Headless Cross"		6:28
3.	"Devil & Daughter"		4:39
4.	"When Death Calls"		6:56
5.	"Kill in the Spirit World"		5:09
6.	"Call of the Wild"		5:18
7.	"Black Moon"	Iommi, Martin, Nicholls	4:05
8.	"Nightwing"	Iommi, Martin, Powell	6:32
Total length:			40:13

Picture disc bonus track / 2024 CD and Streaming track
No.	Title	Length
9.	"Cloak and Dagger"	4:37
Total length:		44:50

== Personnel ==
Black Sabbath

- Tony Iommi – guitars, production
- Cozy Powell – drums, production
- Tony Martin – vocals
- Geoff Nicholls − keyboards
- Laurence Cottle – bass

Additional musician

- Brian May – guitar solo on "When Death Calls"

Technical personnel

- Sean Lynch – engineer, mixing
- Jeremy Lewis – post-production equalisation and remixing on "Nightwing"

== Charts ==
Chart (1989)	Peak position
Australian Albums (ARIA)	132
Dutch Albums (Album Top 100)	71
European Albums Chart	46
Finnish Albums (The Official Finnish Charts)	28
German Albums (Offizielle Top 100)	18
Japanese Albums (Oricon)	66
Swedish Albums (Sverigetopplistan)	22
Swiss Albums (Schweizer Hitparade)	23
UK Albums (Official Charts)	31
US Billboard 200	115

Chart (2025–2026)	Peak position
French Physical Albums (SNEP)	189
French Rock & Metal Albums (SNEP)	62
Greek Albums (IFPI)	65

== Release history ==
Region	Date	Label(s)	Format(s)	Edition(s)	Ref.
Europe	17 April 1989	I.R.S.	CD; cassette; LP; picture disc	Standard	
North America	17 April 1989	I.R.S.; MCA	CD; cassette; LP	Standard	
Japan	7 June 1989	I.R.S.; Victor	CD	Standard	
Europe	September 1999	EMI; I.R.S.; Classic Rock	CD	Reissue	
Europe	31 May 2024	Bluefame Ltd.; BMG	CD; LP	Anno Domini 1989-1995 reissue	
North America	31 May 2024	Warner; Rhino	CD; LP	Anno Domini 1989-1995 reissue	
Europe	15 November 2024	Bluefame Ltd.; BMG	CD; LP	Standalone reissue	
North America	15 November 2024	Warner; Rhino	CD; LP	Standalone reissue	
