= The Black Sabbath Story, Vol. 1 =

The Black Sabbath Story Vol. 1: 1970–1978

Video by Black Sabbath
- Released: VHS – 1991; DVD – 2002
- Genre: Heavy metal
- Length: VHS 60:00; DVD 85:00
- Label: Sanctuary

Black Sabbath video chronology
Black and Blue (1980)	The Black Sabbath Story Vol. 1: 1970–1978 (1991)	The Black Sabbath Story Vol. 2 – 1978–1992 (1992)

Professional ratings
Review scores
Source	Rating
AllMusic	3/5 stars

The Black Sabbath Story Vol. 1 – 1970–1978: is a documentary about the English heavy metal band Black Sabbath that recounts their history from the days of "Earth" (one of their first names), to the separation with Ozzy Osbourne. A DVD version has been released in 2002, with 35 minutes of additional footage, including a promotional video of "A Hard Road" not included in the previous VHS version.

== Track listing ==
Standard Edition

1. "N.I.B."
2. "Paranoid"
3. "War Pigs"
4. "Children of the Grave"
5. "Snowblind"
6. "Sabbath Bloody Sabbath"
7. "Symptom of the Universe"
8. "It's Alright"
9. "Rock 'n' Roll Doctor"
10. "Never Say Die"

DVD Bonus Track

11. "A Hard Road"

== Personnel ==
- Ozzy Osbourne
- Tony Iommi
- Geezer Butler
- Bill Ward

== Certifications ==
Region	Certification	Certified units/sales
Australia (ARIA)	Gold	7,500^{^}
Canada (Music Canada)	Gold	5,000^{^}
United States (RIAA)	Platinum	100,000^{^}
^{^} Shipments figures based on certification alone.
