= The Eternal Idol =

1987 album by Black Sabbath

Studio album by Black Sabbath
- Released: November 1987
- Recorded: October 1986 – March 1987
- Studios: AIR (Salem, Montserrat); AIR (London, UK); Battery (London, UK)
- Genre: Heavy metal
- Length: 43:24
- Labels: Vertigo (Europe); Warner Bros. (US)
- Producers: Jeff Glixman; Vic Coppersmith-Heaven; Chris Tsangarides

Black Sabbath chronology
Seventh Star (1986)	The Eternal Idol (1987)	Headless Cross (1989)

Singles from The Eternal Idol
- 1. "The Shining" Released: 1987

The Eternal Idol is the thirteenth studio album by the English heavy metal band Black Sabbath, released in November 1987, through Vertigo Records in the UK, and on 8 December 1987, through Warner Bros. Records in the US. It is the first Black Sabbath album to feature vocalist Tony Martin, and the final album to be released through Warner Bros. and Vertigo Records, until the release of 13 in 2013.

Recording initially began in October 1986, with producer Jeff Glixman. After a series of internal issues, Glixman was soon replaced by Vic Coppersmith-Heaven, and bassist Dave Spitz left the band, with Bob Daisley brought in to record Spitz's tracks. However, before the completion of the album, Daisley left the band, alongside drummer Eric Singer. Following production issues with Coppersmith-Heaven, the band switched producers once more to Chris Tsangarides, while vocalist Ray Gillen left the band, as he struggled with lyrics. Soon after the departure of Gillen, the band auditioned several vocalists, before deciding on Tony Martin to re-record Gillen's vocals, and enlisted Bev Bevan to record percussion overdubs. Despite these changes in the lineup, they all received writing credits on the album.

Peaking at No. 168 in the US and at No. 66 in the UK, The Eternal Idol received mixed reviews from critics, and did not sell as well as expected, leading to the band being dropped from Warner Bros. and Vertigo Records. Despite this, the band launched a short tour in support of the album.

== Background and overview ==
The album sleeve erroneously credits Dave Spitz as bass player: the bass was actually played by Bob Daisley. Eric Singer played the drums, with the percussion credit for Bev Bevan being for a few cymbal overdubs on "Scarlet Pimpernel".

The album was originally to be recorded with Spitz and vocalist Ray Gillen. The former was replaced by bassist/lyricist Bob Daisley during initial sessions on Montserrat with producer Jeff Glixman. According to Daisley, Gillen had struggled with the lyrics, and management was not paying him or the rest of the band. Gillen quit shortly after their return to England. Daisley worked on the album as a session player, turning down an offer to join the band as he was already committed to working with Gary Moore. Gillen and Singer, who left the band right after he finished his drum parts to join Daisley in Moore's touring band, later joined the band Badlands with bassist Greg Chaisson and guitarist Jake E. Lee, the latter of whom had recently been fired from original Black Sabbath singer Ozzy Osbourne's solo band.

A number of singers auditioned for Black Sabbath, including Jon Oliva of Savatage and a then-unknown Tony Martin. Martin was hired and reconstructed the vocals under the guidance of Chris Tsangarides at Battery Studios shortly before production ended. Most tracks were written by Tony Iommi and Bob Daisley (the vinyl version states that all songs were written by Iommi) although some lyrics were modified by Geoff Nicholls. Martin said he "only sang on, and had no part in writing" The Eternal Idol, but nonetheless "thought [it] was one of the better albums of the band."

The song "Nightmare" was initially written for the 1987 film A Nightmare on Elm Street 3: Dream Warriors.

After Daisley's and Singer's departure, bassist Dave Spitz returned and drummer Bev Bevan, who had previously been a member of Black Sabbath during mid 1983–early 1984, was hired for a 1987 tour in support of the album; however, soon Bevan backed out on learning that Sabbath had booked dates in South Africa during the apartheid crisis.

Bevan was replaced by former Clash drummer Terry Chimes, who appears in the music video for "The Shining". Spitz played bass for a few shows before Jo Burt (formerly of Virginia Wolf) was hired as the new bass player.

The tour was one of Sabbath's shortest, totaling 20 dates: 1 in Greece and 6-7 each in South Africa, Germany and Italy.

The video for "The Shining" was filmed in-between Spitz's departure and Burt's arrival. In 1993, Martin recalled, "The bass player in the 'Shining' video was some guy that we dragged off the street. I can't remember his name but he looked the part (In another interview Martin claims the musician's name was "Steve"). He said that he was a guitarist. I remember he was always talking about how he was a Red Indian, thus all the turquoise he wore! We never saw him again."

== Cover art ==
The album cover features two models in bronze paint re-enacting Auguste Rodin's 1889 sculpture "The Eternal Idol". Due to the paint's toxicity, the models were hospitalized after the shoot. A photograph of the original sculpture was intended as the cover art, but permission could not be secured.

== Release and reception ==
Professional ratings
Review scores
Source	Rating
AllMusic	3/5 stars
Classic Rock	4/10
The Collector's Guide to Heavy Metal	10/10
The Daily Vault	B+
The Rolling Stone Album Guide	2/5 stars

The Eternal Idol was released in November 1987. The album spent six weeks on the Billboard 200 chart, peaking at 168. A three-minute and fifteen second studio outtake titled "Some Kind of Woman", written by Tony Martin shortly after joining the band, appeared as a B-side of "The Shining" single. An early version of "Black Moon"—a song that would ultimately appear on the 1989 album Headless Cross—was released as a B-side of the "Eternal Idol" single.

In 1997, reflecting to Sabbath fanzine Southern Cross, Iommi stated, "I'd like to have seen some of the stuff off The Eternal Idol be a bit more credited, because I think there's some good tracks on that album"; he cited "Ancient Warrior" as one of those tracks.

The album was rereleased on 1 November 2010 in Europe as a two-disc expanded set. Bonus content includes the aforementioned b-sides "Some Kind of Woman" and "Black Moon" on disc 1. Disc 2 contains the session for the album recorded with Ray Gillen on vocals.

In February 2025, it was announced that The Eternal Idol would re-issued for the first time on limited edition, ruby red vinyl as an exclusive for Record Store day. The album's 2025 reissue credits all songwriting to Iommi and Nicholls alone.

== Track listing ==
=== Standard edition ===
All lyrics are written by Bob Daisley, Ray Gillen and Geoff Nicholls, except where noted; all music is composed by Tony Iommi.

Side A
No.	Title	Length
1.	"The Shining"	6:01
2.	"Ancient Warrior"	5:35
3.	"Hard Life to Love"	5:00
4.	"Glory Ride"	4:50

Side B
No.	Title	Length
5.	"Born to Lose"	3:43
6.	"Nightmare"	5:21
7.	"Scarlet Pimpernel" (instrumental)	2:07
8.	"Lost Forever"	4:03
9.	"Eternal Idol"	6:34

=== 2010 Deluxe Edition ===
Disc one - Bonus tracks
No.	Title	Lyrics	Length
10.	"Black Moon" (single B-side)	Tony Martin, Geoff Nicholls	3:39
11.	"Some Kind of Woman" (single B-side)	Martin, Nicholls	3:15

Disc two
No.	Title	Length
1.	"Glory Ride"	5:21
2.	"Born to Lose"	3:41
3.	"Lost Forever"	4:17
4.	"Eternal Idol"	6:48
5.	"The Shining"	6:30
6.	"Hard Life to Love"	5:19
7.	"Nightmare"	4:49
8.	"Ancient Warrior"	4:54

Disc two of the 2010 deluxe edition consists of the earlier recording sessions, with Ray Gillen on vocals.

== Personnel ==
Black Sabbath

- Tony Iommi – guitars
- Tony Martin – vocals
- Geoff Nicholls – keyboards
- Bob Daisley – bass
- Eric Singer – drums

Additional personnel

- Ray Gillen – sinister laugh on "Nightmare", vocals on 2010 deluxe edition Disc 2
- Bev Bevan – percussion and cymbal overdubs on "Scarlet Pimpernel"

Technical personnel

- Jeff Glixman – producer, engineer at Associated Independent Recording Studios Montserrat
- Vic Coppersmith-Heaven – producer, engineer at Associated Independent Recording Studios London
- Chris Tsangarides – producer, engineer and mixing at Battery Studios, London

== Release history ==
Region	Date	Label
United Kingdom	November 1987	Vertigo Records
United States	8 December 1987	Warner Bros. Records
Canada	1987	Warner Bros. Records
United Kingdom	April 1996	Castle Communications
United Kingdom	25 October 2004	Sanctuary Records
United Kingdom	16 November 2010 (2 CD)	Sanctuary Records/Universal Music Group

== Charts ==
Chart (1987–1988)	Peak position
Canada Top Albums/CDs (RPM)	86
Finnish Albums (The Official Finnish Charts)	25
UK Albums (Official Charts)	66
US Billboard 200	168

Chart (2025)	Peak position
Austrian Albums (Ö3 Austria)	52
Greek Albums (IFPI)	48
Swiss Albums (Schweizer Hitparade)	73
