= Trashed (Black Sabbath song) =

Single by Black Sabbath

from the album Born Again
- B-side: "Stonehenge"; "Zero the Hero" (promo)
- Released: October 1983
- Recorded: 1983
- Genre: Heavy metal
- Length: 4:16
- Label: Vertigo
- Songwriters: Tony Iommi, Ian Gillan, Geezer Butler and Bill Ward
- Producer: Black Sabbath

"Trashed" is the opening song and first single from the 1983 album Born Again by the English heavy metal band Black Sabbath.

== Background ==
Vocalist Ian Gillan composed the lyrics to "Trashed" after taking a car belonging to drummer Bill Ward without permission and crashing it during an alcohol-fuelled joyride around the grounds of the recording studio. Gillan recounts:

I did have a small mishap… having clipped a pile of tyres on a previous lap, I ran over one of them on the next and was instantly flipped, skidding and spinning upside down at a high speed and for a great distance along the road, until I stopped eventually, inches short of the swimming pool.

The owner of the car was not amused by the mishap. "I remember the night that Ian crashed that car…" Ward remarked. "I know why that car crashed and I didn't find it amusing anymore. I went through hell behind narcotic and alcohol addiction, and so things [like] 'I crashed my car, man', I take these things real serious now. It's not fun for me at all… I'm not saying that the song was glamorized, but I prefer not to glamorize it."

"Trashed" was released as a single with an accompanying music video. The track was one of many targeted by the PMRC and was included on the group's "Filthy Fifteen" list due to its subject matter.

The song was re-recorded by Gillan for his solo album Gillan's Inn, with Tony Iommi, Ian Paice and Roger Glover. This version reappeared on the 2011 compilation Ian Gillan & Tony Iommi: WhoCares.

Gillan referred back to the song on Deep Purple's 2020 album Whoosh! in "The Long Way Round", which features the lyrics: "I promised myself I would not get trashed again, but the way I’m feeling right now, that promise is going down the drain."

== Track listing ==
1. "Trashed" – 3:56
2. "Stonehenge" – 4:52
