= Anno Domini 1989–1995 =

Box set by Black Sabbath
- Released: 31 May 2024
- Recorded: August 1988 – March 1995
- Genre: Heavy metal
- Labels: BMG; Warner/Rhino (North America)

Black Sabbath chronology
The End: Live in Birmingham (2017)	Anno Domini 1989–1995 (2024)

Singles from Anno Domini 1989–1995
- 1. "Headless Cross" / "Anno Mundi" Released: 22 March 2024; 2. "Evil Eye" / "Get a Grip" Released: 24 May 2024

Anno Domini 1989–1995 is a box set by the English heavy metal band Black Sabbath, released on 31 May 2024. It includes four of five albums from the 1987–1997 Tony Martin-era of the band, with Headless Cross (1989), Tyr (1990) and Cross Purposes (1994) all remastered, and Forbidden (1995) remixed by guitarist Tony Iommi, making this the first time those albums have officially been reissued or remastered.

== Background ==
From a period of 1989 to 1996, Black Sabbath were signed to I.R.S. Records, which released five albums under that label (Headless Cross, Tyr, Dehumanizer (European release only), Cross Purposes, and Forbidden). By the end of 1996, the label had been shuttered and in turn followed by a short period of reissues through EMI Records, the rights were returned to Tony Iommi somewhere after the label's dissolution.

Iommi mentioned re-releases of the Martin-era catalogue as early as March 2016, explaining, "We've held back on the reissues of those albums because of the current Sabbath thing with Ozzy Osbourne, but they will certainly be happening... I'd like to do a couple of new tracks for those releases with Tony Martin... I'll also be looking at working on Cross Purposes and Forbidden." In February 2019, Iommi stated that he was working on a remix of Forbidden "on and off" with Mike Exeter. On 14 May 2020, in an interview with Eddie Trunk, Iommi stated that the remix of Forbidden was complete, but added that he was just waiting for "the right time" to release it. In 2022, Martin confirmed a record deal had been reached for a possibility of the reissue.

On 31 December 2023, Iommi announced that a Black Sabbath box set of Martin-era albums was due for release in May 2024. On 21 March 2024, Anno Domini 1989–1995 was revealed as the title of the box set and it was announced that it would be released on 31 May. The day after the box set was announced, the remastered versions of "Headless Cross" and "Anno Mundi" were released to streaming services, together as a two-song single.

On 24 May 2024, a newly remixed version of "Get a Grip" and a remastered version of "Evil Eye" were released together as a two-song single. A remastered music video for "Get a Grip" was released on Iommi's YouTube channel on the same day.

== Release ==
Anno Domini 1989–1995 was released on 31 May 2024 via Iommi's rights label, Bluefame Ltd. through BMG in Europe and Warner Records in North America. The box set does not include The Eternal Idol (1987), Martin's debut with Black Sabbath, as it was released by Vertigo/Warner Bros. while I.R.S. Records released all the albums from Headless Cross to Forbidden (1992's Dehumanizer, which featured Ronnie James Dio instead of Martin, was released on I.R.S. in the UK while Reprise Records released it in North America).

An additional song was added to three of the four discs. "Cloak and Dagger" from the Headless Cross disc was previously available as a B-side to the "Headless Cross" single, and also appeared as a bonus track on the vinyl picture disc edition. "What's the Use?" on Cross Purposes and "Loser Gets It All" on Forbidden were previously available as bonus tracks to the Japanese editions of the respective albums, while the latter also appeared on the 1996 compilation album The Sabbath Stones. Tyr is the only disc from the box set with no bonus material.

On 15 November 2024, the four remastered/remixed albums included in the box set were also released individually on CD and vinyl.

== Commercial performance ==
In the United States, the box set peaked at number ten on the Billboard Top Album Sales chart, selling at 7,200 copies in its first week according to Luminate. It also charted at number 11 in its vinyl counterpart and number 15 in its Hard Rock Albums chart.

== Track listing ==
=== Headless Cross ===
Headless Cross (disc one)
No.	Title	Writer(s)	Length
1.	"The Gates of Hell" (instrumental)	Tony Iommi, Cozy Powell, Geoff Nicholls	1:06
2.	"Headless Cross"	Tony Martin, Iommi, Powell	6:28
3.	"Devil & Daughter"	Martin, Iommi, Powell	4:39
4.	"When Death Calls"	Martin, Iommi, Powell, Nicholls	6:56
5.	"Kill in the Spirit World"	Iommi, Powell, Martin	5:09
6.	"Call of the Wild"	Iommi, Powell, Martin	5:18
7.	"Black Moon"	Martin, Iommi, Powell, Nicholls	4:05
8.	"Nightwing"	Martin, Iommi, Powell	6:32
9.	"Cloak and Dagger" (CD bonus track)	Martin, Iommi, Powell	4:37

=== Tyr ===
All lyrics are written by Tony Martin; all music is composed by Black Sabbath.

Tyr (disc two)
No.	Title	Length
1.	"Anno Mundi"	6:12
2.	"The Law Maker"	3:53
3.	"Jerusalem"	3:59
4.	"The Sabbath Stones"	6:46
5.	"The Battle of Tyr" (instrumental)	1:08
6.	"Odin's Court"	2:42
7.	"Valhalla"	4:41
8.	"Feels Good to Me"	5:44
9.	"Heaven in Black"	4:05

=== Cross Purposes ===
All tracks are written by Geezer Butler, Tony Iommi and Tony Martin, except "Evil Eye" written by Butler, Iommi, Martin, and Eddie Van Halen (Van Halen was uncredited due to restrictions from his record label, Warner Bros. Records).

Cross Purposes (disc three)
No.	Title	Length
1.	"I Witness"	4:56
2.	"Cross of Thorns"	4:32
3.	"Psychophobia"	3:16
4.	"Virtual Death"	5:49
5.	"Immaculate Deception"	4:15
6.	"Dying for Love"	5:53
7.	"Back to Eden"	3:57
8.	"The Hand That Rocks the Cradle"	4:31
9.	"Cardinal Sin"	4:20
10.	"Evil Eye"	5:58
11.	"What's the Use?" (CD bonus track)	3:03

=== Forbidden ===
All lyrics are written by Tony Martin, except "The Illusion of Power" by Martin and Ice-T; all music is composed by Black Sabbath.

Forbidden (disc four)
No.	Title	Length
1.	"The Illusion of Power" (featuring Ice-T)	4:50
2.	"Get a Grip"	4:01
3.	"Can't Get Close Enough"	4:32
4.	"Shaking Off the Chains"	4:07
5.	"I Won't Cry for You"	5:24
6.	"Guilty as Hell"	3:30
7.	"Sick and Tired"	3:30
8.	"Rusty Angels"	5:14
9.	"Forbidden"	3:46
10.	"Kiss of Death"	6:11
11.	"Loser Gets It All" (CD bonus track)	2:56

== Personnel ==
Black Sabbath

- Tony Iommi – guitars
- Tony Martin – vocals
- Geoff Nicholls – keyboards
- Cozy Powell – drums (Headless Cross, Tyr, and Forbidden)
- Bobby Rondinelli – drums (Cross Purposes)
- Neil Murray – bass (Tyr and Forbidden)
- Geezer Butler – bass (Cross Purposes)

Additional musicians

- Laurence Cottle – bass (Headless Cross)
- Brian May – first guitar solo on "When Death Calls"
- Ice-T – additional vocals on "The Illusion of Power"

== Charts ==
Chart performance for Anno Domini 1989–1995
Chart (2024)	Peak position
Austrian Albums (Ö3 Austria)	12
Belgian Albums (Ultratop Flanders)	96
Belgian Albums (Ultratop Wallonia)	176
Finnish Albums (Suomen virallinen lista)	18
German Albums (Offizielle Top 100)	9
Hungarian Physical Albums (MAHASZ)	13
Italian Albums (FIMI)	77
Polish Albums (ZPAV)	48
Scottish Albums (Official Charts)	13
Spanish Albums (Promusicae)	70
Swedish Albums (Sverigetopplistan)	43
Swiss Albums (Schweizer Hitparade)	11
UK Independent Albums (Official Charts)	7
UK Rock & Metal Albums (Official Charts)	1
US Top Album Sales (Billboard)	10
US Vinyl Albums (Billboard)	11
US Top Hard Rock Albums (Billboard)	15
