= The Collection (Black Sabbath album) =

Compilation album by Black Sabbath
- Released: Jul 1, 1992; June 28, 1999 (reissue)
- Recorded: 1969–1978
- Genres: Heavy metal, blues rock
- Length: 72:13
- Label: Castle

Black Sabbath chronology
Dehumanizer (1992)	The Collection (1992)	Cross Purposes (1994)

Professional ratings
Review scores
Source	Rating
Allmusic	3/5 stars

The Collection is a compilation album released by the English heavy metal band Black Sabbath in 1992. The album was released on the label Castle, who released two CD versions of this album in the UK, both with the same cover art and songs. The album has 15 tracks, two from Black Sabbath, two from Paranoid, one from Master of Reality, two from Black Sabbath Vol. 4, two from Sabbath Bloody Sabbath, two from Sabotage, two from Technical Ecstasy and two from Never Say Die!.

== Track listing ==
All songs credited to Tony Iommi, Ozzy Osbourne, Geezer Butler and Bill Ward.

1. "Paranoid" – 2:52
2. "Tomorrow's Dream" – 3:09
3. "Back Street Kids" – 3:47
4. "Symptom of the Universe" – 3:49
5. "Never Say Die" – 3:49
6. "Junior's Eyes" – 6:43
7. "Dirty Women" – 7:09
8. "Am I Going Insane (Radio)" – 4:16
9. "Supernaut" – 4:43
10. "The Wizard" – 4:25
11. "A National Acrobat" – 6:13
12. "Electric Funeral" – 4:52
13. "Into the Void" – 6:12
14. "Spiral Architect" – 5:31
15. "Wicked World" – 4:43

== Personnel ==
- Ozzy Osbourne – lead vocals, harmonica
- Tony Iommi – guitars, synthesisers
- Geezer Butler – bass
- Bill Ward – drums, percussion
