= The Ozzy Osbourne Years =

Compilation album by Black Sabbath
- Released: 2 April 1991
- Recorded: 1969–1975
- Genre: Heavy metal
- Labels: Castle Communications; Teichiku Records (Japan)
- Producers: Rodger Bain; Black Sabbath; Mike Butcher; Patrick Meehan

Black Sabbath chronology
Tyr (1990)	The Ozzy Osbourne Years (1991)	Dehumanizer (1992)

Professional ratings
Review scores
Source	Rating
Allmusic	4/5 stars

The Ozzy Osbourne Years is a compilation album by the English heavy metal band Black Sabbath. Released on 2 April 1991 by Castle Communications, the album features a 3 disc set including songs from Black Sabbath (1970) to Sabotage (1975), minus the instrumental tracks from said albums.

The album peaked at number 182 on the ARIA Charts.

== Track listing ==
Disc 1

1. "Black Sabbath"
2. "The Wizard"
3. "Behind The Wall Of Sleep"
4. "N.I.B."
5. "Evil Woman"
6. "Sleeping Village"
7. "Warning"
8. "War Pigs"
9. "Paranoid"
10. "Planet Caravan"
11. "Iron Man"
12. "Hand Of Doom"
13. "Fairies Wear Boots"

Disc 2

1. "Electric Funeral"
2. "Sweet Leaf"
3. "After Forever"
4. "Embryo/Children Of The Grave"
5. "Lord Of This World"
6. "Solitude"
7. "Into The Void"
8. "Wheels Of Counfusion"
9. "Tomorrow's Dream"
10. "Changes"
11. "Supernaut"
12. "Snowblind"
13. "Cornucopia"
14. "St. Vitus Dance"
15. "Under The Sun"

Disc 3

1. "Sabbath Bloody Sabbath"
2. "A National Acrobat"
3. "Sabbra Cadabra"
4. "Killing Yourself To Live"
5. "Who Are You?"
6. "Looking For Today"
7. "Spiral Architect"
8. "Hole In The Sky"
9. "Symptom Of The Universe"
10. "Am I Going Insane (Radio)"
11. "Thrill Of It All"
12. "Megalomania"
13. "The Writ"

== Personnel ==
- Ozzy Osbourne – vocals
- Tony Iommi – guitars
- Geezer Butler – bass
- Bill Ward – drums
