= Cross Purposes =

1994 album by Black Sabbath

Studio album by Black Sabbath
- Released: 26 January 1994
- Recorded: 1993
- Studios: Monnow Valley Studios (Rockfield, Wales)
- Genre: Heavy metal
- Length: 47:27
- Label: I.R.S.
- Producers: Leif Mases; Black Sabbath

Black Sabbath chronology
The Collection (1992)	Cross Purposes (1994)	Cross Purposes Live (1995)

Cross Purposes is the seventeenth studio album by the English heavy metal band Black Sabbath, first released through I.R.S. Records on 26 January 1994 in Japan, and on 31 January 1994 in Europe, and on 8 February in North America. The album marked the return of Tony Martin as the band's lead vocalist, after the second departure of Ronnie James Dio.

A live album Cross Purposes Live, which was recorded during the tour for the album, was released in 1995. In 2024, a remaster of the album was announced as part of the box set Anno Domini 1989–1995, marking the first time the album has been officially reissued. The CD edition of the album contains the Japanese bonus track "What's the Use?". A stand alone remastered CD with bonus track was released on 15 November 2024.

== Background and recording ==
Dehumanizer saw the reunion of Mob Rules-era Black Sabbath, but, after the tour, Ronnie James Dio (vocals) and Vinny Appice (drums) departed. They were replaced by former Sabbath vocalist Tony Martin and former Rainbow drummer Bobby Rondinelli. Geezer Butler remained with the group, although he would depart later in the year again before the recording of the Forbidden album. Rondinelli left the recording sessions for Quiet Riot's album Terrified to join Black Sabbath. The album was recorded at Monnow Valley Studio, in Wales.

== Songs ==
Tony Martin explained during the show at Roseland in NYC on 12 February 1995, that "Psychophobia" was about David Koresh, and the Waco, Texas, incident.

A promo video in black-and-white was shot for the song "The Hand That Rocks the Cradle". Tony Martin explained in a 2011 interview with Martin Popoff that he wrote this song about Beverly Allitt, a children's hospital nurse in England who was convicted of serial infanticide in 1993. The video features a young girl, assumably in reference to this.

The song "Cardinal Sin" was originally intended to be titled "Sin Cardinal Sin" (or "Sin, Cardinal Sin") but a printing error on the album sleeve caused the first word to be removed. Sabbath simply adopted the title "Cardinal Sin" as the name of the song.

"What's the Use?" was released only on the Japanese edition of Cross Purposes, which also contained a free sticker of the artwork. A nearly identical version of the "burning angel" image was featured on the Scorpions single Send Me an Angel three years earlier.

== Reception ==
=== Critical reception ===
Professional ratings
Review scores
Source	Rating
AllMusic	3/5 stars
Entertainment Weekly	D
The Rolling Stone Album Guide	2/5 stars
Select	1/5 stars

Bradley Torreano of AllMusic rated the album 3 stars out of 5, praising it for bridging various aspects of the band's different eras. He said it was "the first album since Born Again that actually sounds like a real Sabbath record" and "probably the best thing they'd released since The Mob Rules, even with the filler tracks and keyboards." In July 2014, Guitar World magazine ranked Cross Purposes at number six in the "Superunknown: 50 Iconic Albums That Defined 1994" list.

=== Sales ===
The album peaked at number 122 on the US Billboard 200 charts but made it to number 41 on the UK album charts. In both Finland and Sweden, the album peaked at number nine.

== Track listing ==
All tracks are written by Tony Iommi, Tony Martin and Geezer Butler, except where noted.

No.	Title	Writer(s)	Length
1.	"I Witness"		4:56
2.	"Cross of Thorns"	Iommi, Martin, Butler, Geoff Nicholls (Note: Nicholls is uncredited on the original release of the album but is credited on the 2024 box set Anno Domini 1989–1995)	4:32
3.	"Psychophobia"		3:16
4.	"Virtual Death"		5:49
5.	"Immaculate Deception"		4:15
6.	"Dying for Love"	Iommi, Martin, Butler, Nicholls	5:53
7.	"Back to Eden"		3:57
8.	"The Hand That Rocks the Cradle"		4:31
9.	"Cardinal Sin"	Iommi, Martin, Butler, Nicholls	4:20
10.	"Evil Eye"	Iommi, Martin, Butler, Nicholls, Eddie Van Halen (Note: Van Halen is uncredited as a co-writer due to restrictions from his label, Warner Bros. Records)	5:58

Bonus track on Japanese edition & 2024 remaster
No.	Title	Length
11.	"What's the Use"	3:03

== Personnel ==
Black Sabbath

- Tony Martin – vocals
- Tony Iommi – guitars
- Geezer Butler – bass
- Bobby Rondinelli – drums
- Geoff Nicholls – keyboards

Technical personnel

- Leif Mases – producer, engineer, mixing
- Darren Galer – assistant engineer
- Dave Somers – assistant engineer
- Tony Cousins – mastering

== Charts ==
Chart (1994)	Peak position
Australian Albums (ARIA)	173
Austrian Albums (Ö3 Austria)	23
Dutch Albums (Album Top 100)	85
European Albums Chart	38
Finnish Albums (The Official Finnish Charts)	9
German Albums (Offizielle Top 100)	32
Japanese Albums (Oricon)	32
Swedish Albums (Sverigetopplistan)	9
Swiss Albums (Schweizer Hitparade)	41
UK Albums (Official Charts)	41
US Billboard 200	122

Chart (2025)	Peak position
Greek Albums (IFPI)	64

Chart (2026)	Peak position
French Physical Albums (SNEP)	189
French Rock & Metal Albums (SNEP)	75

== Notes ==
The angel artwork depicted on the cover originally appeared on the 1990 single Send Me An Angel by the German hard rock band Scorpions.
