= Dehumanizer =

1992 album by Black Sabbath

Studio album by Black Sabbath
- Released: 22 June 1992
- Recorded: Late 1991–early 1992
- Studio: Rockfield (Rockfield, Wales)
- Genre: Heavy metal
- Length: 52:17
- Label: I.R.S.
- Producer: Reinhold Mack

Black Sabbath chronology
The Ozzy Osbourne Years (1991)	Dehumanizer (1992)	The Collection (1992)

Singles from Dehumanizer
- 1. "TV Crimes" Released: 1 June 1992; 2. "Master of Insanity" Released: September 1992

Professional ratings
Review scores
Source	Rating
AllMusic	2.5/5 stars
Classic Rock	7/10
The Daily Vault	A-
Entertainment Weekly	B+
Piercingmetal.com	(3.75/5)
The Rolling Stone Album Guide	2/5 stars

Dehumanizer is the sixteenth studio album by the English heavy metal band Black Sabbath. It was first released on 22 June 1992 in the UK by I.R.S. Records and on 30 June 1992 in the US by Reprise Records.

It was Sabbath's first and only studio album since Mob Rules (1981) to feature vocalist Ronnie James Dio and drummer Vinny Appice, and their first in nine years to feature original bassist Geezer Butler. Initial writing and demo sessions at Rich Bitch Studios in Birmingham featured drummer Cozy Powell; bootlegs of these sessions exist. However, when Powell became injured with a broken hip, he was replaced with Appice. With Appice back in the band, this effectively reunited the Mob Rules lineup. The band spent two weeks writing material before spending six weeks rehearsing and recording demos at Monnow Valley Studios in Wales.

The album's lineup – Dio, Appice, Butler and guitarist Tony Iommi – reunited in 2006 for a greatest hits set, Black Sabbath: The Dio Years, and a new studio album in 2009, The Devil You Know (billed as Heaven & Hell).

The album was re-released, with bonus content, on 7 February 2011.

== Overview ==
Lyrically and musically, Dehumanizer is considered one of Sabbath's heaviest albums. Lyrical themes vary from a computer worshipped as a god ("Computer God"), to televangelists ("TV Crimes"), to individualism ("I") and doubts about the afterlife ("After All (The Dead)").

The album was recorded in Wales, at Rockfield Studios. It was intended to feature Cozy Powell, then Sabbath's drummer, but he was immobilised by a broken pelvic bone sustained in a horse riding accident. Dio initially wanted to replace Powell with Simon Wright, from AC/DC and his own band, but Butler and Iommi rejected him. They instead recruited Vinny Appice, who had served as Sabbath's drummer during most of Dio's previous tenure with the band, from 1980–1982.

During sessions for the album, Tony Martin made a short comeback when invited by the band to try the songs out. He stayed for just a couple of days and the band continued with Dio. Martin stated: "I had already started my first solo album Back Where I Belong – so, when I got the call to go back, I was committed by that point. And in fact it was just a couple of months after they had started the thing with Ronnie James Dio. I was determined to finish my solo thing and so turned them down at that point. We did keep in touch though and I went to some shows. Ronnie wasn't too pleased, but eventually they had enough and asked me to rejoin again later so it felt like I hadn't actually left. In fact, I was never formally fired; the phone just stopped ringing. Ian Gillan [vocalist for Deep Purple, and another ex-Sabbath singer] asked me once if I had actually been fired and I said, 'No.' He said, 'Neither have I.' We should just turn up one day and walk on stage!"

Demo sessions with Powell yielded numerous recordings, including two unreleased songs – "The Night Life" (also called "Next Time"), whose riff was later used for "Psychophobia" on Cross Purposes, and "Bad Blood," which sounds very similar to "I" on Dehumanizer. These songs can be found, along with other demos and untitled songs, on the Complete Dehumanizer Sessions bootleg. "Computer God" was the title of an unreleased song by The Geezer Butler Band, in 1986 – only the title made it to Dehumanizer. The Butler version is available as a download on his website. "Master of Insanity" was also an unreleased Geezer Butler Band track, of which the Dehumanizer version is essentially a rerecording. "Master of Insanity" was the only track on Dehumanizer that Dio did not have a hand in writing the lyrics. Jimi Bell, the guitarist with Butler's band actually wrote the song. Geezer promised a credit and payment, but Jimi never was paid or credited for his contributions. The album's lead single, "TV Crimes," was a criticism of American televangelists, particularly Jeff Fenholt, who briefly worked with Iommi in the mid-1980s on what would become Seventh Star.

"We wanted it to be real rock 'n' roll: real basic," Dio told WERS' Nasty Habits show. "We wanted to capture what we are live and that's really what I think we did. We didn't do tons of overdubs or a lot of chorus‑y kind of things. I think the important thing is that a band should be able to do all the things they do on record live, without any kind of sampling crap or that rubbish – so, of course, we didn't. We recorded it true to what the band is: just guitar, bass, drums and vocals, y'know – a couple of keyboard things here and there."

Although the Sabbath lineup was the same as 1981's Mob Rules, the musical direction is very different, and a marked change from their previous material, particularly the preceding Tyr. Much of the album anticipates the directions taken by Dio in his eponymous solo band's next two records, Strange Highways (1993) and Angry Machines (1996). Commercially, the album marked a resurgence for Sabbath. It reached the Top 40 in the UK, and peaked at number 44 on the Billboard 200 chart.

== Aftermath ==
"It was good to try that with Ronnie," Iommi reflected in 1997. "[But] we lost millions on it... because of the time we took to record it, and fly backwards and forwards to the States with everything, all the gear; bringing it back; recording here [the UK]... A lot of messing about and a lot of money wasted... If it came to it again now, we could plan it different and it'd be okay, but we had to try that. Originally Cozy was involved, then he wasn't."

This incarnation of Sabbath ended when Dio's contract with the band ended several days before the Costa Mesa reunion shows in November 1992. According to Iommi, Dio quit because he was asked to support Ozzy Osbourne's final shows at Costa Mesa, referring to Ozzy as a "clown." Dio would not record or perform with the band again until 2006. For the two Costa Mesa shows, the band replaced Dio with Judas Priest frontman Rob Halford; on the second night, Iommi, Butler and original Sabbath drummer Bill Ward joined Osbourne onstage for four songs. Halford and Dio were friends (Dio having been impressed with Halford's work ethic on the 'Stars' project) and Halford would only do the Costa Mesa shows with Dio's blessing, which he received when he spoke with Dio by phone. Both shows were unofficially recorded in their entirety and are now widely circulated as audio and video bootlegs.

Dehumanizer is included in the Black Sabbath box set The Rules of Hell.

Dehumanizer was rereleased on 7 February 2011. This version includes a bonus disc with alternate recordings of several songs ("Master of Insanity," "Letters from Earth" and "Time Machine," the latter of which is available on the US version of the album as a bonus track) and several other songs recorded on 25 July 1992 in Tampa, Florida.

In 2021, Kerrang! ranked Dehumanizer as the eighth-best Black Sabbath album in a best-to-worst ranking of the band's discography.

In October 2026, a snippet of "I" was featured in a radio station derived from the video game Grand Theft Auto VI. It was later confirmed to be part of the upcoming Grand Theft Auto VI: The Album soundtrack release.

== Track listing ==
All tracks are written by Geezer Butler, Ronnie James Dio and Tony Iommi.

No.	Title	Length
1.	"Computer God"	6:10
2.	"After All (The Dead)"	5:37
3.	"TV Crimes"	3:58
4.	"Letters from Earth"	4:12
5.	"Master of Insanity"	5:54
6.	"Time Machine"	4:10
7.	"Sins of the Father"	4:43
8.	"Too Late"	6:54
9.	"I"	5:10
10.	"Buried Alive"	4:47
Total length:		52:17

US edition bonus track
No.	Title	Length
11.	"Time Machine" (Wayne's World: Music from the Motion Picture version)	4:18
Total length:		56:35

2011 Deluxe Edition disc two
No.	Title	Original source	Length
1.	"Master of Insanity"	Single edit	4:11
2.	"Letters from Earth"	B-side of "TV Crimes"	4:42
3.	"Time Machine"	Wayne's World version	4:21
4.	"Children of the Sea" (Butler, Dio, Iommi, Bill Ward)	Recorded live at The Sundome, Tampa, Florida, 25 July 1992	6:23
5.	"Die Young" (Butler, Dio, Iommi, Ward)	Recorded live at The Sundome, Tampa, Florida, 25 July 1992	2:16
6.	"TV Crimes"	Recorded live at The Sundome, Tampa, Florida, 25 July 1992	4:24
7.	"Master of Insanity/After All (The Dead)"	Recorded live at The Sundome, Tampa, Florida, 25 July 1992	7:39
8.	"Neon Knights" (Butler, Dio, Iommi, Ward)	Recorded live at The Sundome, Tampa, Florida, 25 July 1992	5:34
Total length:			39:30

== Personnel ==
Info taken from Dehumanizer liner notes

Black Sabbath

- Ronnie James Dio – vocals
- Tony Iommi – guitars
- Geezer Butler – bass
- Vinny Appice – drums

Additional musician

- Geoff Nicholls – keyboards

Production

- Produced, engineered, and mixed by Mack
- "Time Machine" (Wayne's World Version) produced by Black Sabbath
- Assistant engineers – Darren Galer and Stephen Wissnet
- Remastered by Dan Hersch (2008 reissue)
- Remastered by Andy Pearce (2011 reissue)
- Cover illustration & nbsp; – Wil Rees
- Photography & nbsp; – Mark "Weissguy" Weiss

== Charts ==
=== Album ===
Chart (1992)	Peak position
Austrian Albums (Ö3 Austria)	7
Canada Top Albums/CDs (RPM)	36
Dutch Albums (Album Top 100)	63
European Albums Chart	36
Finnish Albums (The Official Finnish Charts)	12
German Albums (Offizielle Top 100)	14
Japanese Albums (Oricon)	28
Swedish Albums (Sverigetopplistan)	12
Swiss Albums (Schweizer Hitparade)	13
UK Albums (Official Charts)	28
US Billboard 200	44

Chart (2011–2012)	Peak position
Finnish Albums (Suomen virallinen lista)	31
UK Rock & Metal Albums (Official Charts)	40

=== Singles ===
Year	Single	Chart	Position
1992	"TV Crimes"	UK Singles Chart	33

== Release history ==
Release formats for Dehumanizer
Region	Date	Label	Format	Edition	Ref.
United Kingdom	22 June 1992	I.R.S.; EMI	CD; cassette; LP	Standard	
North America	30 June 1992	Reprise	CD; cassette; LP	Standard	
Japan	8 July 1992	I.R.S.; EMI	CD	Standard	
North America	17 October 2008	Reprise; Rhino	CD	Reissue	
Europe	7 February 2011	EMI	2xCD	Expanded	
Japan	4 April 2011 (Note: Oricon Japan website states Dehumanizer deluxe edition was released on 13 April 2011.)	EMI	2xCD	Expanded	
Japan	27 July 2016	I.R.S.; Capitol; USM	2xCD	Expanded	
North America	25 October 2019	Reprise; Rhino	2xCD; LP	Expanded	
