= Black Sabbath =

English heavy metal band

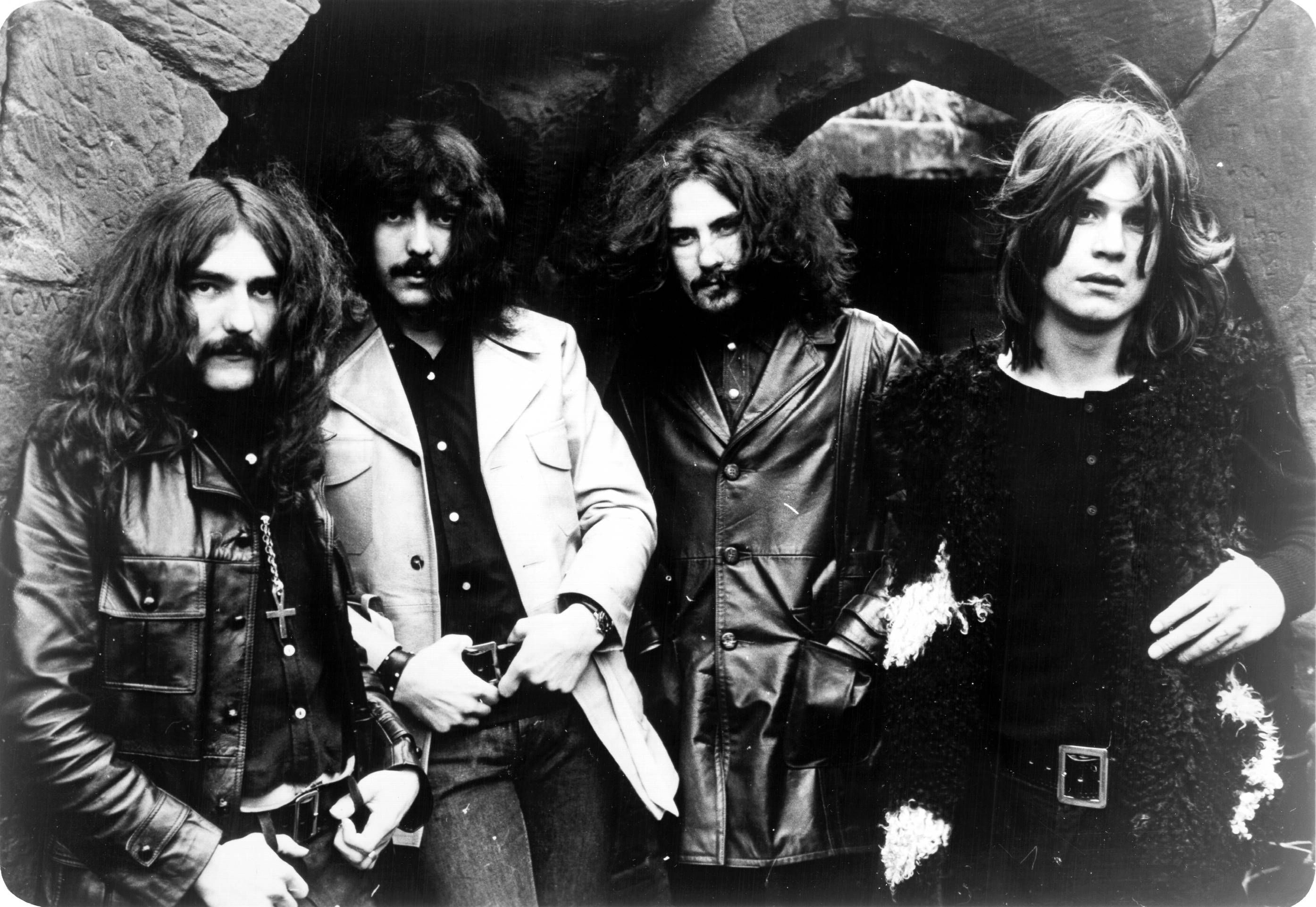
- Black Sabbath in 1970. From left to right: Geezer Butler, Tony Iommi, Bill Ward and Ozzy Osbourne.

Background information
- Also known as: The Polka Tulk Blues Band (1968); Earth (1968–1969)
- Origin: Birmingham, England
- Genre: Heavy metal
- Works: Discography
- Years active: 1968–2006 (Note: Hiatuses: 1984–1985, 1996–1997); 2011–2017; 2025
- Labels: Fontana; Vertigo; Mercury; Virgin EMI; Universal; Warner Bros.; I.R.S.; Sanctuary
- Spinoffs: Dio; Heaven & Hell
- Spinoff of: Mythology; Rare Breed
- Past members: Tony Iommi; Bill Ward; Geezer Butler; Ozzy Osbourne; (List of Black Sabbath members)
- Website: blacksabbath.com

Black Sabbath were an English heavy metal band formed in Birmingham in 1968 by guitarist Tony Iommi, drummer Bill Ward, bassist Geezer Butler and vocalist Ozzy Osbourne. After adopting the Black Sabbath name in 1969 (the band were previously named Polka Tulk Blues Band and then Earth), they distinguished themselves through occult themes with horror-inspired lyrics and down-tuned guitars. Their first three albums, Black Sabbath, Paranoid (both 1970), and Master of Reality (1971), were commercially successful, and are cited as pioneering albums in the development of heavy metal. Subsequent albums Vol. 4 (1972), Sabbath Bloody Sabbath (1973), Sabotage (1975), Technical Ecstasy (1976), and Never Say Die! (1978) saw the band explore more experimental and progressive styles.

Osbourne was fired from Black Sabbath in 1979 and replaced by former Rainbow vocalist Ronnie James Dio, who recorded three albums with the band, Heaven and Hell (1980), Mob Rules (1981), and their first authorised live album Live Evil (1983), the last two featuring drummer Vinny Appice replacing Ward. Following Dio and Appice's departures, Iommi and Butler recorded Born Again (1983) with Ward returning on drums, and Ian Gillan, then-formerly of Deep Purple, on vocals. By 1984, Butler, Ward, and Gillan had all departed, leaving Iommi to assemble a new version of Black Sabbath. For the next thirteen years, the band endured many personnel changes that included vocalists Glenn Hughes (another former Deep Purple member, who sang on Black Sabbath's 1986 album Seventh Star) and Tony Martin, as well as several bassists and drummers. Of the vocalists during these years, Martin's tenure was the longest, joining in 1987 and recording three albums – The Eternal Idol (1987), Headless Cross (1989), and Tyr (1990) – before his initial departure in 1991. That same year, Iommi reunited with Butler, Dio and Appice to record Dehumanizer (1992), though Dio and Appice both departed again by the end of 1992. Martin returned for two more studio albums, Cross Purposes (1994) and Forbidden (1995), and one live album, Cross Purposes Live (1995), before the band went on a one-year hiatus.

The original line-up of Iommi, Osbourne, Butler, and Ward reunited in 1997, releasing a live album, Reunion (1998), and touring sporadically until 2005. The following year, the Mob Rules line-up (Iommi, Butler, Dio, Appice) reunited as Heaven & Hell, touring during the late 2000s and releasing one studio album, The Devil You Know (2009), before disbanding after Dio's death in 2010. The original line-up resumed again in 2011, though Ward departed prior to the recording of their final studio album 13 (2013). To conclude their farewell tour, Black Sabbath played their last concert for eight years in their home city in 2017. Occasional partial reunions occurred, most notably when Osbourne and Iommi performed at the closing ceremony of the 2022 Commonwealth Games in Birmingham. The original line-up of Black Sabbath reunited for a final show for both the band and Osbourne as a solo artist, titled Back to the Beginning, at Villa Park on 5 July 2025; Osbourne died seventeen days after the performance.

Black Sabbath had sold over 70 million records as of 2013, making them one of the most commercially successful heavy metal bands. The band have been referred to as being part of the "unholy trinity of British hard rock and heavy metal in the early to mid-seventies", along with Deep Purple and Led Zeppelin. Black Sabbath were ranked by MTV as the "Greatest Metal Band of All Time" and placed second on VH1's "100 Greatest Artists of Hard Rock" list. Rolling Stone magazine ranked them 85 on its "100 Greatest Artists of All Time". They were inducted into the UK Music Hall of Fame in 2005 and Rock and Roll Hall of Fame in 2006. They won two Grammy Awards for Best Metal Performance, and received a Grammy Lifetime Achievement Award.

== History ==
=== 1968–1969: Formation and early days ===
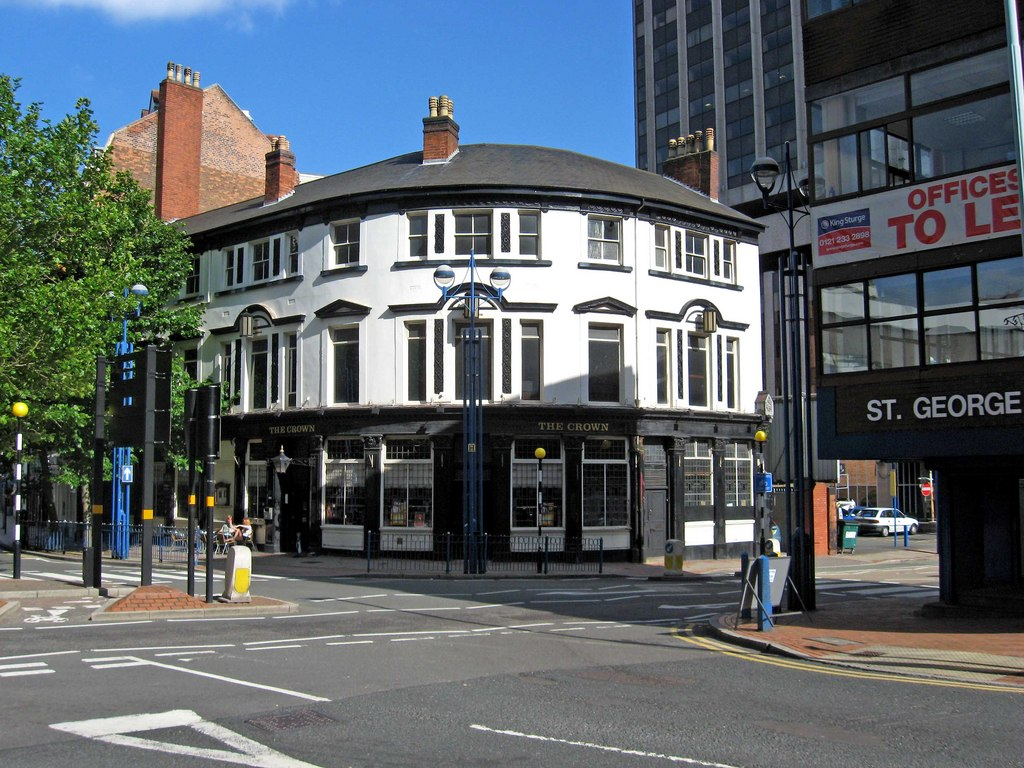
The Crown in Birmingham, where the band played their first show

Following the break-up of their previous band, Mythology, in 1968, guitarist Tony Iommi and drummer Bill Ward sought to form a heavy blues rock band in Aston, Birmingham. They enlisted bassist Geezer Butler and vocalist Ozzy Osbourne, who had played together in a band called Rare Breed; Osbourne having placed an advertisement in a local music shop: "OZZY ZIG Needs Gig – has own PA". The new group was initially named the Polka Tulk Blues Band, the name taken either from a brand of talcum powder or an Indian/Pakistani clothing shop; the exact origin is confused. The Polka Tulk Blues Band included slide guitarist Jimmy Phillips, a childhood friend of Osbourne's, and saxophonist Alan "Aker" Clarke. After shortening the name to Polka Tulk, the band again changed their name to Earth. Iommi became concerned that Phillips and Clarke lacked the necessary dedication and were not taking the band seriously. Rather than asking them to leave, they instead decided to break up and then quietly reformed the band as a four-piece. While the band was performing under the Earth moniker, they recorded several demos written by Norman Haines such as "The Rebel", "When I Came Down" and "Song for Jim", the latter of which being a reference to Jim Simpson, who was a manager for the bands Bakerloo Blues Line and Tea & Symphony, as well as the trumpet player for the group Locomotive. Simpson had recently started a new club named Henry's Blueshouse at The Crown Hotel in Birmingham and offered to let Earth play there after they agreed to waive the usual support band fee in return for free T-shirts. The audience response was positive and Simpson agreed to manage Earth.

In December 1968, Iommi abruptly left Earth to join Jethro Tull. Although his stint with the band would be short-lived, Iommi made an appearance with Jethro Tull on The Rolling Stones Rock and Roll Circus TV show. Unsatisfied with the direction of Jethro Tull, Iommi returned to Earth by the end of the month. "It just wasn't right, so I left", Iommi said. "At first I thought Tull were great, but I didn't much go for having a leader in the band, which was Ian Anderson's way. When I came back from Tull, I came back with a new attitude altogether. They taught me that to get on, you got to work for it."

While playing shows in England in 1969, the band discovered they were being mistaken for another English group named Earth, so they decided to change their name again (this name change would give rise to the well-known debate about the alleged aesthetic influence of Coven, which the British band always denied). A cinema across the street from the band's rehearsal room was showing the 1963 Italian horror film Black Sabbath, starring Boris Karloff and directed by Mario Bava. While watching people line up to see the film, Butler noted that it was "strange that people spend so much money to see scary movies". Following that, Osbourne and Butler wrote the lyrics for a song called "Black Sabbath", which was inspired by the work of horror and adventure-story writer Dennis Wheatley, along with a vision that Butler had of a black silhouetted figure standing at the foot of his bed. Making use of the musical tritone, also known as "the Devil's Interval", the song's ominous sound and dark lyrics pushed the band in a darker direction, a stark contrast to the popular music of the late 1960s, which was dominated by flower power, folk music and hippie culture. Judas Priest frontman Rob Halford has called the track "probably the most evil song ever written". Inspired by the new sound, the band changed their name to Black Sabbath in August 1969, and made the decision to focus on writing similar material in an attempt to create the musical equivalent of horror films.

=== 1969–1971: Black Sabbath and Paranoid ===
The band's first show as Black Sabbath took place on 30 August 1969 in Workington, England. They signed to Philips Records in November 1969.

The band were afforded two days of studio time at Regent Sounds Studio in November 1969 to record their self-titled debut album with producer Rodger Bain. Iommi recalls recording live: "We thought, 'We have two days to do it, and one of the days is mixing.' So we played live. Ozzy was singing at the same time; we just put him in a separate booth and off we went. We never had a second run of most of the stuff". On 11 November 1969 Black Sabbath recorded a four-song session for John Peel's Top Gear radio show broadcast on BBC Radio 1. The four songs were "Black Sabbath", "N.I.B.", "Behind the Wall of Sleep" and "Sleeping Village". Broadcast on 29 November 1969, this gave them their first exposure to a UK wide audience.

Recorded during their self-titled debut album session, their first single, "Evil Woman" (a cover of a song by the band Crow), was released on 2 January 1970 through Philips' subsidiary Fontana Records. "Evil Woman" failed to chart. Later releases were handled by Philips' newly formed progressive rock label Vertigo Records.

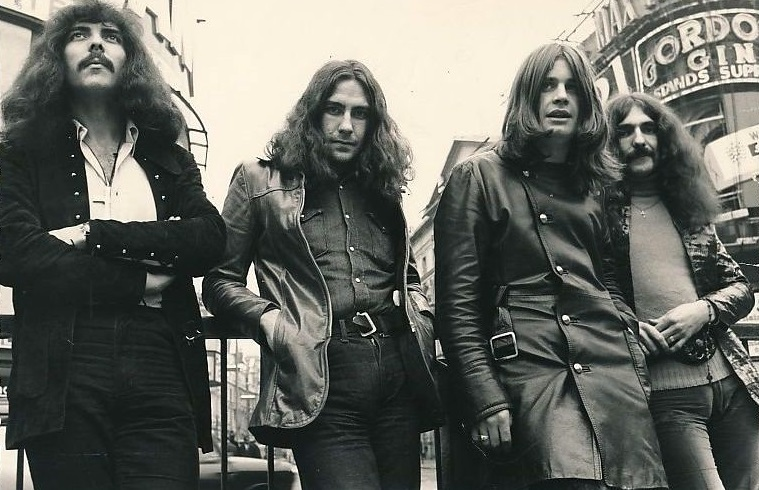
Black Sabbath at Piccadilly Circus, London in 1970 (left to right: Iommi, Ward, Osbourne, Butler)

Their debut album Black Sabbath was released on Friday the 13th, February 1970, and reached number eight in the UK Albums Chart. Following its US and Canadian release in May 1970 by Warner Bros. Records, the album reached number 23 on the Billboard 200, where it remained for over a year. The album was given negative reviews by many critics. Lester Bangs dismissed it in a Rolling Stone review as "discordant jams with bass and guitar reeling like velocitised speedfreaks all over each other's musical perimeters, yet never quite finding synch". It sold in substantial numbers despite being panned, giving the band their first mainstream exposure. It has since been certified Platinum in both US by the Recording Industry Association of America (RIAA) and in the UK by British Phonographic Industry (BPI), and is now generally accepted as the first heavy metal album.

The band returned to the studio in June 1970, just four months after Black Sabbath was released. The new album was initially set to be named War Pigs after the song "War Pigs", which was critical of the Vietnam War; however, Warner changed the title of the album to Paranoid. Most of this album's songs were originally created in the fall of 1969 in a music club in Zurich, Switzerland. Black Sabbath's engagement there included seven 45-minute sets per day for six weeks. They played at what was then known as the 'Beat Club' (also called the Hirschen Club) on the ground floor of the Hotel Hirschen in Zurich's old town. Most of the songs on Paranoid evolved during onstage improvisational jams there. The album's lead single, "Paranoid", was written in the studio at the last minute. Ward explains: "We didn't have enough songs for the album, and Tony just played the [Paranoid] guitar lick and that was it. It took twenty, twenty-five minutes from top to bottom." The single was released in September 1970 and reached number four on the UK singles chart, remaining Black Sabbath's only top 10 hit. The album followed in the UK in October 1970, where, pushed by the success of the "Paranoid" single, it reached number one on the UK Albums Chart.

The US release was held off until January 1971, as the Black Sabbath album was still on the chart at the time of Paranoid's UK release. The album reached No. 12 in the US in March 1971, and would go on to sell four million copies in the US with virtually no radio airplay. Like Black Sabbath, the album was panned by rock critics of the era, but modern-day reviewers such as AllMusic's Steve Huey cite Paranoid as "one of the greatest and most influential heavy metal albums of all time", which "defined the sound and style of heavy metal more than any other record in rock history". The album was ranked at number 131 on Rolling Stone magazine's list of The 500 Greatest Albums of All Time. Paranoid's chart success allowed the band to tour the US for the first time – their first US show was at a club called Ungano's at 210 West 70th Street in New York City – and spawned the release of the album's second single, "Iron Man". Although the single failed to reach the top 40, it remains one of Black Sabbath's most popular songs, as well as the band's highest-charting US single until 1998's "Psycho Man".

=== 1971–1973: Master of Reality and Vol. 4 ===
In February 1971, after a one-off performance at the Myponga Pop Festival in Australia, Black Sabbath returned to the studio to begin work on their third album. Following the chart success of Paranoid, the band were afforded more studio time, along with a "briefcase full of cash" to buy drugs. "We were getting into coke, big time", Ward explained. "Uppers, downers, Quaaludes, whatever you like. It got to the stage where you come up with ideas and forget them, because you were just so out of it."

Production completed in April 1971, and in July the band released Master of Reality, just six months after the US release of Paranoid. The album reached the top 10 in the US and the United Kingdom, and was certified Gold in less than two months, eventually receiving Platinum certification in the 1980s and Double Platinum in the early 21st century. It contained Sabbath's first acoustic songs, alongside fan favourites such as "Children of the Grave" and "Sweet Leaf". Critical response of the era was generally unfavourable, with Lester Bangs delivering an ambivalent review of Master of Reality in Rolling Stone, describing the closing "Children of the Grave" as "naïve, simplistic, repetitive, absolute doggerel – but in the tradition [of rock 'n' roll] ... The only criterion is excitement, and Black Sabbath's got it". (In 2003, Rolling Stone would place the album at number 300 on their 500 Greatest Albums of All Time list.) Following the Master of Reality world tour in 1972, the band took their first break in three years. As Ward explained: "The band started to become very fatigued and very tired. We'd been on the road non-stop, year in and year out, constantly touring and recording. I think Master of Reality was kind of like the end of an era, the first three albums, and we decided to take our time with the next album."

In June 1972, the band reconvened in Los Angeles to begin work on their next album at the Record Plant. With more time in the studio, the album saw the band experimenting with new textures, such as strings, piano, orchestration and multi-part songs. Recording was plagued with problems, many as a result of substance abuse issues. Struggling to record the song "Cornucopia" after "sitting in the middle of the room, just doing drugs", Ward was nearly fired. "I hated the song, there were some patterns that were just ... horrible," the drummer said. "I nailed it in the end, but the reaction I got was the cold shoulder from everybody. It was like, 'Well, just go home; you're not being of any use right now.' I felt like I'd blown it, I was about to get fired". Butler thought that the end product "was very badly produced, as far as I was concerned. Our then-manager insisted on producing it, so he could claim production costs".

The album was originally titled Snowblind after the song of the same name, which deals with cocaine abuse. The record company changed the title at the last minute to Black Sabbath Vol. 4. Ward observed, "There was no Volume 1, 2 or 3, so it's a pretty stupid title, really". Vol. 4 was released in September 1972, and while critics were dismissive, it achieved Gold status in less than a month, and was the band's fourth consecutive release to sell a million in the US. "Tomorrow's Dream" was released as a single – the band's first since "Paranoid" – but failed to chart. Following an extensive tour of the US, in 1973 the band travelled again to Australia, followed by a tour for the first time to New Zealand, before moving onto mainland Europe. "The band were definitely in their heyday", recalled Ward, "in the sense that nobody had burnt out quite yet".

=== 1973–1976: Sabbath Bloody Sabbath and Sabotage ===
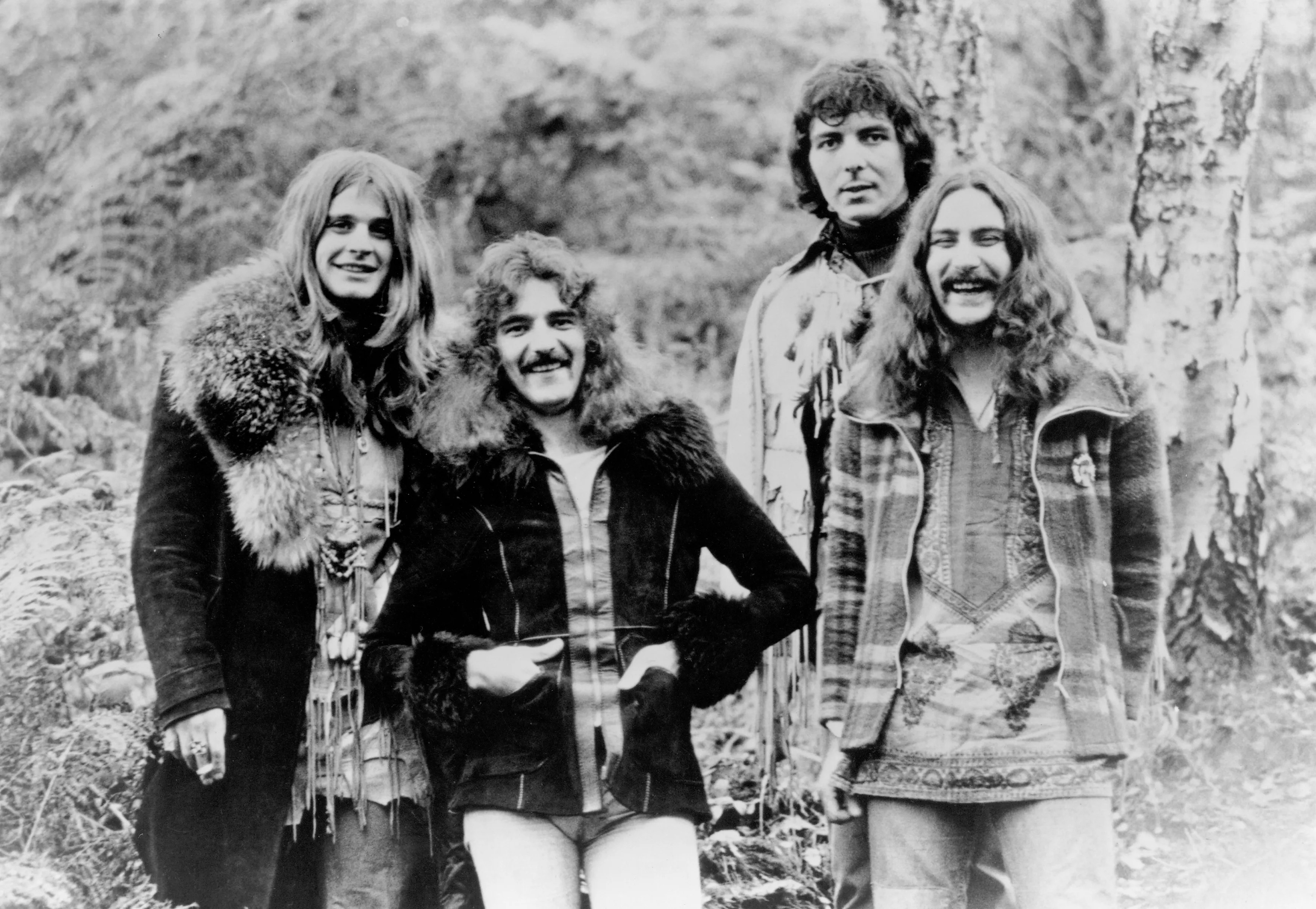
Black Sabbath original line-up in 1973 (left to right: Osbourne, Butler, Iommi, Ward)

Following the Vol. 4 world tour, Black Sabbath returned to Los Angeles to begin work on their next release. Pleased with the Vol. 4 album, the band sought to recreate the recording atmosphere, and returned to the Record Plant studio in Los Angeles. With new musical innovations of the era, the band were surprised to find that the room they had used previously at the Record Plant was replaced by a "giant synthesiser". The band rented a house in Bel Air and began writing in the summer of 1973, but in part because of substance issues and fatigue, they were unable to complete any songs. "Ideas weren't coming out the way they were on Vol. 4, and we really got discontent", Iommi said. "Everybody was sitting there waiting for me to come up with something. I just couldn't think of anything. And if I didn't come up with anything, nobody would do anything".

After a month in Los Angeles with no results, the band opted to return to England. They rented Clearwell Castle in The Forest of Dean. "We rehearsed in the dungeons and it was really creepy, but it had some atmosphere, it conjured up things and stuff started coming out again". While working in the dungeon, Iommi stumbled onto the main riff of "Sabbath Bloody Sabbath", which set the tone for the new material. Recorded at Morgan Studios in London by Mike Butcher and building off the stylistic changes introduced on Vol. 4, new songs incorporated synthesisers, strings and complex arrangements. Yes keyboardist Rick Wakeman was brought in as a session player, appearing on "Sabbra Cadabra".

In November 1973, Black Sabbath began to receive positive reviews in the mainstream press after the release of Sabbath Bloody Sabbath, with Gordon Fletcher of Rolling Stone calling the album "an extraordinarily gripping affair" and "nothing less than a complete success". Later reviewers such as AllMusic's Eduardo Rivadavia cite the album as a "masterpiece, essential to any heavy metal collection", while also displaying "a newfound sense of finesse and maturity". The album marked the band's fifth consecutive Platinum-selling album in the US, reaching number four on the UK Albums Chart and number 11 in the US.

The band began a world tour in January 1974, which culminated at the California Jam festival in Ontario, California, on 6 April 1974. Attracting over 200,000 fans, Black Sabbath appeared alongside popular 1970s rock and pop bands Deep Purple, Eagles, Emerson, Lake & Palmer, Rare Earth, Seals & Crofts, Black Oak Arkansas and Earth, Wind & Fire. Portions of the show were telecast on ABC Television in the US, exposing the band to a wider American audience. In the same year, the band shifted management, signing with notorious English manager Don Arden. The move caused a contractual dispute with Black Sabbath's former management, and while on stage in the US, Osbourne was handed a subpoena that led to two years of litigation.

Black Sabbath began work on their sixth album in February 1975, again in England at Morgan Studios in Willesden, this time with a decisive vision to differ the sound from Sabbath, Bloody Sabbath. "We could've continued and gone on and on, getting more technical, using orchestras and everything else which we didn't particularly want to. We took a look at ourselves, and we wanted to do a rock album – Sabbath, Bloody Sabbath wasn't a rock album, really". Produced by Black Sabbath and Mike Butcher, Sabotage was released in July 1975. As with its precursor, the album initially saw favourable reviews, with Rolling Stone stating "Sabotage is not only Black Sabbath's best record since Paranoid, it might be their best ever", although later reviewers such as AllMusic noted that "the magical chemistry that made such albums as Paranoid and Volume 4 so special was beginning to disintegrate".

Sabotage reached the top 20 in both the US and the United Kingdom, but was the band's first release not to achieve Platinum status in the US, only achieving Gold certification. Although the album's only single "Am I Going Insane (Radio)" failed to chart, Sabotage features fan favourites such as "Hole in the Sky" and "Symptom of the Universe". Black Sabbath toured in support of Sabotage with openers Kiss, but were forced to cut the tour short in November 1975, following a motorcycle accident in which Osbourne ruptured a muscle in his back. In December 1975, the band's record companies released a greatest hits album without input from the band, titled We Sold Our Soul for Rock 'n' Roll. The album charted throughout 1976, eventually selling two million copies in the US

=== 1976–1979: Technical Ecstasy, Never Say Die!, and Osbourne's departure ===
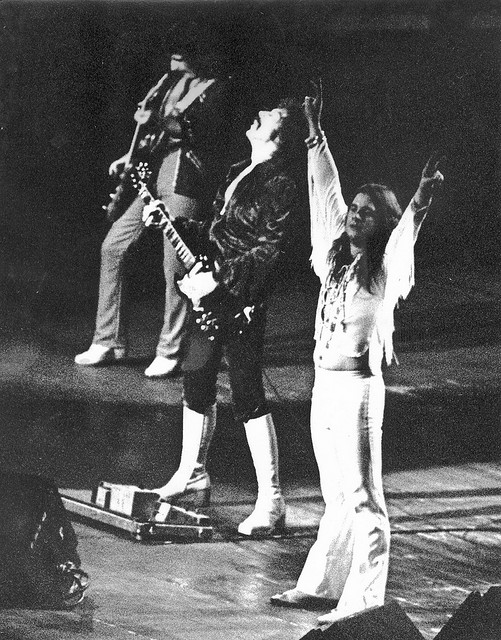
Black Sabbath at Madison Square Garden, New York City in 1977

Black Sabbath began work for their next album at Criteria Studios in Miami, Florida, in June 1976. To expand their sound, the band added keyboard player Gerald Woodroffe, who also had appeared to a lesser extent on Sabotage. During the recording of Technical Ecstasy, Osbourne admitted that he began losing interest in Black Sabbath and began to consider the possibility of working with other musicians. Recording of Technical Ecstasy was difficult; by the time the album was completed, Osbourne was admitted to Stafford County Asylum in Britain. It was released on 22 October 1976 to mixed reviews, and – for the first time – later music critics gave the album less favourable retrospective reviews; two decades after its release, AllMusic gave the album two stars, and noted that the band was "unravelling at an alarming rate". The album featured less of the doomy, ominous sound of previous efforts, and incorporated more synthesisers and uptempo rock songs. Technical Ecstasy failed to reach the top 50 in the US and was the band's second consecutive release not to achieve Platinum status, although it was later certified Gold in 1997. The album included "Dirty Women", which remains a live staple, as well as Ward's first lead vocal on the song "It's Alright". Touring in support of Technical Ecstasy began in November 1976, with openers Boston and Ted Nugent in the US, and completed in Europe with AC/DC in April 1977.

In late 1977, while in rehearsal for their next album and just days before the band was set to enter the studio, Osbourne abruptly quit the band. Iommi called vocalist Dave Walker, a longtime friend of the band who had previously been a member of Fleetwood Mac and Savoy Brown, and informed him that Osbourne had left the band. Walker, who was at that time fronting a band called Mistress, flew to Birmingham from California in late 1977 to write material and rehearse with Black Sabbath. On 8 January 1978, Walker made his only live performance with Black Sabbath, on vocals, when they played an excerpt of "War Pigs" and an early version of "Junior's Eyes" on the BBC West Midlands Television programme Look! Hear! Walker later recalled that, while in Birmingham, he had bumped into Osbourne in a pub and came to the conclusion that Osbourne was not fully committed to leaving Black Sabbath. "The last Sabbath albums were just very depressing for me", Osbourne said. "I was doing it for the sake of what we could get out of the record company, just to get fat on beer and put a record out." Walker has said that he wrote a lot of lyrics during his brief time in the band, but none of them were ever used. If any recordings of this version of the band other than the Look! Hear! footage still exist, Walker says that he is not aware of them.

Osbourne initially set out to form a solo project featuring former Dirty Tricks members John Frazer-Binnie, Terry Horbury and Andy Bierne. As the new band were in rehearsals in January 1978, Osbourne had a change of heart and rejoined Black Sabbath. "Three days before we were due to go into the studio, Ozzy wanted to come back to the band", Iommi explained. "He wouldn't sing any of the stuff we'd written with the other guy (Walker), so it made it very difficult. We went into the studio with basically no songs. We'd write in the morning so we could rehearse and record at night. It was so difficult, like a conveyor belt, because you couldn't get time to reflect on stuff. 'Is this right? Is this working properly?' It was very difficult for me to come up with the ideas and putting them together that quick".

The band spent five months at Sounds Interchange Studios in Toronto, Ontario, Canada, writing and recording what would become Never Say Die!. "It took quite a long time", Iommi said. "We were getting really drugged out, doing a lot of dope. We'd go down to the sessions, and have to pack up because we were too stoned, we'd have to stop. Nobody could get anything right, we were all over the place, everybody's playing a different thing. We'd go back and sleep it off, and try again the next day". The album was released on 29 September 1978, reaching number 12 in the United Kingdom and number 69 in the US. The press response was unfavourable and did not improve over time, with Eduardo Rivadavia of AllMusic stating two decades after its release that the album's "unfocused songs perfectly reflected the band's tense personnel problems and drug abuse". The album featured the singles "Never Say Die" and "Hard Road", both of which cracked the top 40 in the United Kingdom. The band also made their second appearance on the BBC's Top of the Pops, performing "Never Say Die". It took nearly 20 years for the album to be certified Gold in the US

Touring in support of Never Say Die! began in May 1978 with openers Van Halen. Reviewers called Black Sabbath's performance "tired and uninspired", a stark contrast to the "youthful" performance of Van Halen, who were touring the world for the first time. The band filmed a performance at the Hammersmith Odeon in June 1978, which was later released on DVD as Never Say Die. The final show of the tour – and Osbourne's last appearance with the band until later reunions – was in Albuquerque, New Mexico, on 11 December.

Following the tour, Black Sabbath returned to Los Angeles and again rented a house in Bel Air, where they spent nearly a year working on new material for the next album. The entire band were abusing both alcohol and other drugs, but Iommi says Osbourne "was on a totally different level altogether". The band would come up with new song ideas, but Osbourne showed little interest and would refuse to sing them. Pressure from the record label and frustrations with Osbourne's lack of input coming to a head, Iommi made the decision to fire Osbourne in 1979. Iommi believed the only options available were to fire Osbourne or break the band up completely. "At that time, Ozzy had come to an end", Iommi said. "We were all doing a lot of drugs, a lot of coke, a lot of everything, and Ozzy was getting drunk so much at the time. We were supposed to be rehearsing and nothing was happening. It was like, 'Rehearse today? No, we'll do it tomorrow.' It really got so bad that we didn't do anything. It just fizzled out". Ward, who was close with Osbourne, was chosen by Iommi to break the news to the singer on 27 April 1979. "I hope I was professional, I might not have been, actually. When I'm drunk I am horrible, I am horrid", Ward said. "Alcohol was definitely one of the most damaging things to Black Sabbath. We were destined to destroy each other. The band were toxic, very toxic".

=== 1979–1982: Dio joins, Heaven and Hell and Mob Rules ===
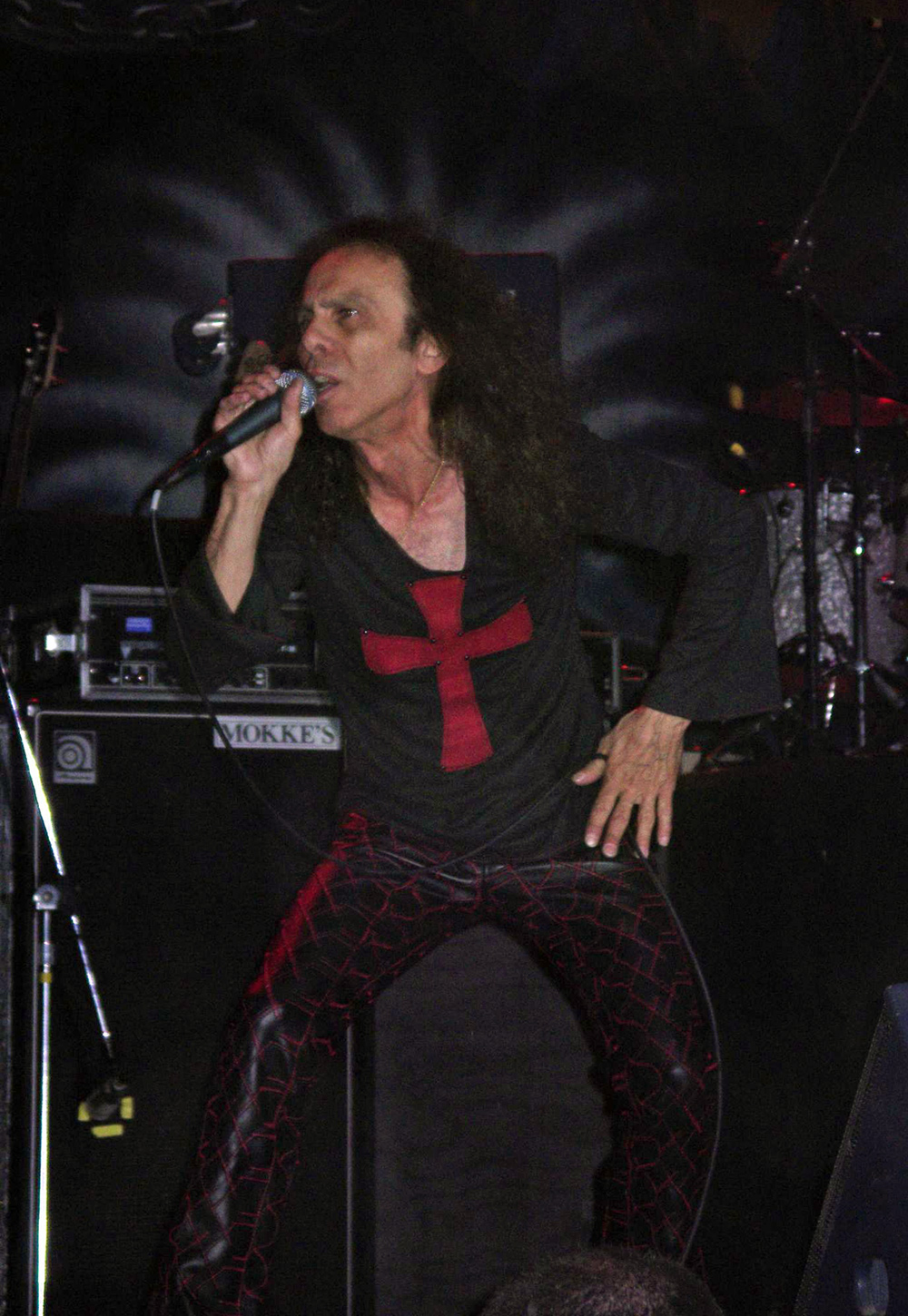
Ronnie James Dio's first stint as the singer of Black Sabbath lasted from 1979 to 1982.

While Don Arden was trying to convince Osbourne to rejoin Black Sabbath, as he viewed the original line-up as the most profitable, the band hired former Rainbow frontman Ronnie James Dio as Osbourne's replacement, and they began writing their next album. With a notably different vocal style from Osbourne's, Dio's addition to the band marked a change in Black Sabbath's sound. "They were totally different altogether", Iommi explains. "Not only voice-wise, but attitude-wise. Ozzy was a great showman, but when Dio came in, it was a different attitude, a different voice and a different musical approach, as far as vocals. Dio would sing across the riff, whereas Ozzy would follow the riff, like in "Iron Man". Ronnie came in and gave us another angle on writing."

Butler temporarily left the band in September 1979 to deal with the divorce from his first wife. According to Dio, the band initially hired Craig Gruber, with whom Dio had previously played while in Elf and Rainbow, on bass to assist with writing the new album. Gruber was soon replaced by Geoff Nicholls of Quartz. The new line-up returned to Criteria Studios in November to begin recording work, with Butler returning to the band in January 1980 and Nicholls moving to keyboards. Produced by Martin Birch, Heaven and Hell was released on 25 April 1980, to critical acclaim. Over a decade after its release, AllMusic said the album was "one of Sabbath's finest records, the band sounds reborn and re-energised throughout". Heaven and Hell peaked at number nine in the United Kingdom and number 28 in the US, the band's highest-charting album since Sabotage. The album eventually sold a million copies in the US, and the band embarked on an extensive world tour, making their first live appearance with Dio in Germany on 17 April 1980.

Black Sabbath toured the US throughout 1980 with Blue Öyster Cult on the "Black and Blue" tour, with a show at Nassau Coliseum in Uniondale, New York, filmed for Don Kirshner's Rock Concert and later released theatrically in 1981 as Black and Blue. On 26 July 1980, the band played to 75,000 fans at a sold-out Los Angeles Memorial Coliseum with Journey, Cheap Trick and Molly Hatchet. The next day, the band appeared at the 1980 Day on the Green at Oakland Coliseum. While on tour, Black Sabbath's former label in England issued a live album culled from a seven-year-old performance, titled Live at Last without any input from the band. The album reached number five on the UK chart and saw the re-release of "Paranoid" as a single, which reached the top 20.

On 18 August 1980, after a show in Bloomington, Minnesota, Ward quit the band. "It was intolerable for me to get on the stage without Ozzy. And I drank 24 hours a day, my alcoholism accelerated". Butler stated that after Ward's final show, the drummer came in drunk, stating that "he might as well be a Martian". Ward then got angry, packed his things and got on a bus to leave. Following Ward's sudden departure, the group hired drummer Vinny Appice. Further trouble for the band came during their 9 October 1980 concert at the Milwaukee Arena, which degenerated into a riot that caused $10,000 in damages to the arena and resulted in 160 arrests. According to the Associated Press: "The crowd of mostly adolescent males first became rowdy in a performance by the Blue Oyster Cult" and then grew restless while waiting an hour for Black Sabbath to begin playing. A member of the audience threw a beer bottle that struck Butler and effectively ended the show. "The band then abruptly halted its performance and began leaving" as the crowd rioted.

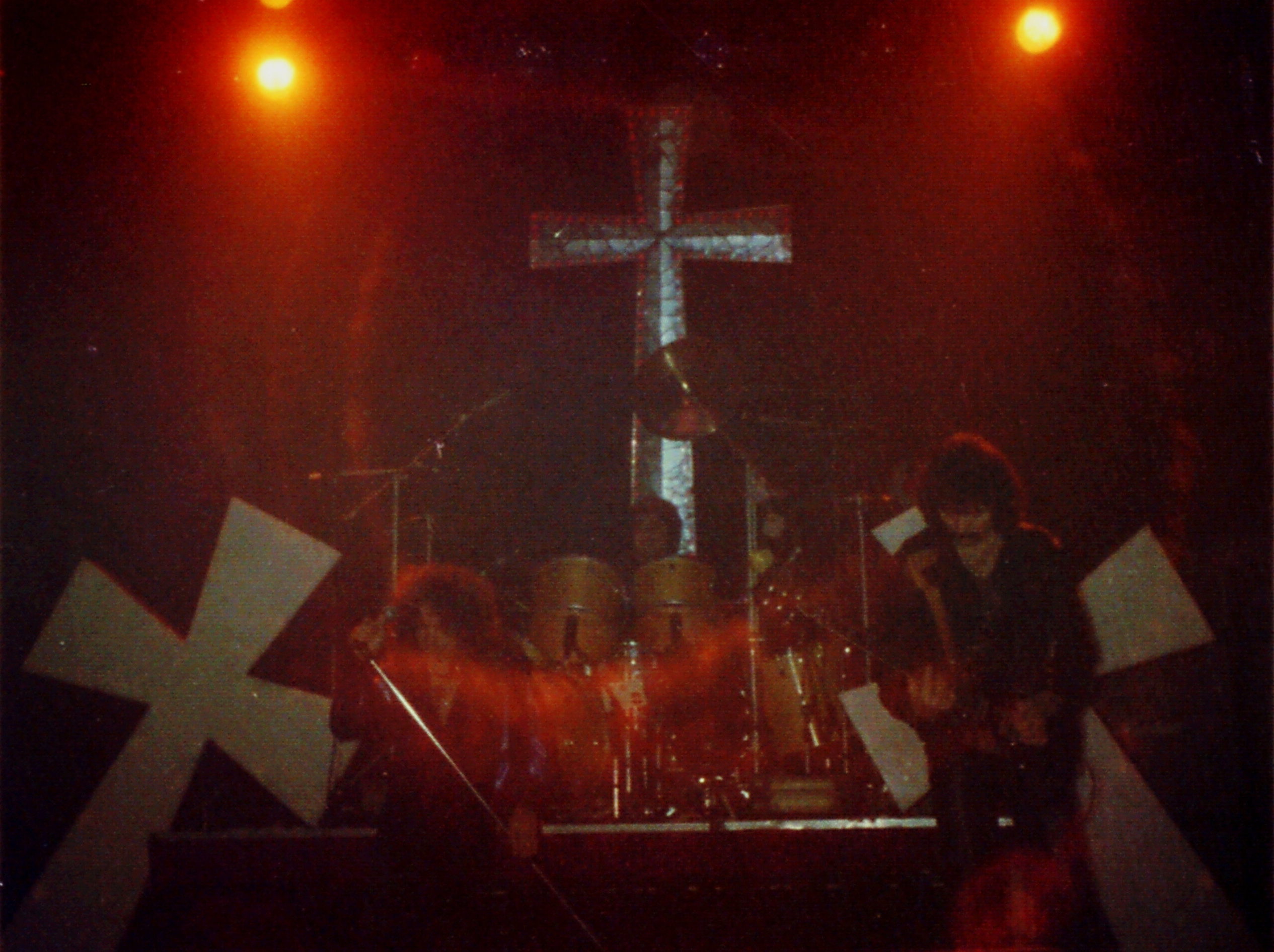
Black Sabbath performing in Cardiff, Wales, in 1981

The band completed the Heaven and Hell world tour in February 1981 and returned to the studio to begin work on their next album. Black Sabbath's second studio album that was produced by Martin Birch and featured Ronnie James Dio as vocalist, Mob Rules, was released in October 1981 and was well received by fans, but less so by critics. Rolling Stone reviewer J. D. Considine gave the album one star, claiming "Mob Rules finds the band as dull-witted and flatulent as ever". Like most of the band's earlier work, time helped to improve the opinions of the music press. A decade after its release, AllMusic's Eduardo Rivadavia called Mob Rules "a magnificent record". The album was certified Gold and reached the top 20 on the UK chart. The album's title track, "The Mob Rules", which was recorded at John Lennon's old house in England, was also featured in the 1981 animated film Heavy Metal, although the film version is an alternate take and differs from the album version.

Unhappy with the quality of 1980's Live at Last, the band recorded another live album – titled Live Evil – during the Mob Rules world tour, across the United States in Dallas, San Antonio and Seattle, in 1982. During the mixing process for the album, Iommi and Butler had a falling-out with Dio. Misinformed by their then-current mixing engineer, Iommi and Butler accused Dio of sneaking into the studio at night to raise the volume of his vocals. In addition, Dio was not satisfied with the pictures of him in the artwork. Butler also accused Dio and Appice of working on a solo album during the album's mixing without telling the other members of Black Sabbath. "Ronnie wanted more say in things", Iommi said. "And Geezer would get upset with him and that is where the rot set in. Live Evil is when it all fell apart. Ronnie wanted to do more of his own thing, and the engineer we were using at the time in the studio didn't know what to do, because Ronnie was telling him one thing and we were telling him another. At the end of the day, we just said, 'That's it, the band is over'". "When it comes time for the vocal, nobody tells me what to do. Nobody! Because they're not as good as me, so I do what I want to do", Dio later said. "I refuse to listen to Live Evil, because there are too many problems. If you look at the credits, the vocals and drums are listed off to the side. Open up the album and see how many pictures there are of Tony, and how many there are of me and Vinny".

Ronnie James Dio left Black Sabbath in November 1982 to start his own band and took drummer Vinny Appice with him. Live Evil was released in January 1983, but was overshadowed by Ozzy Osbourne's Platinum-selling album Speak of the Devil.

=== 1982–1984: Gillan as singer and Born Again ===
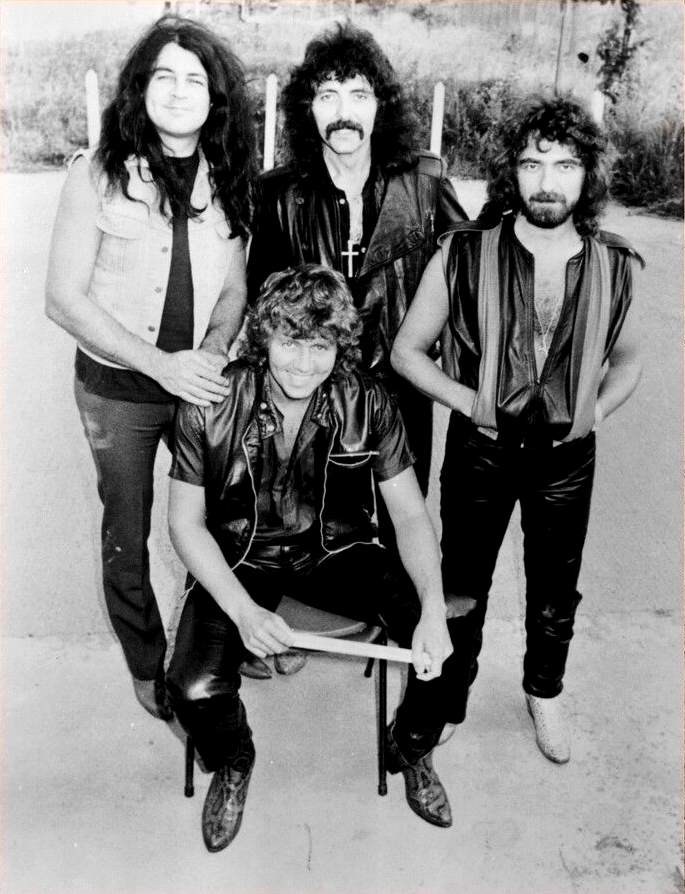
Black Sabbath in 1983. L-R: Ian Gillan, Bev Bevan (bottom), Tony Iommi, Geezer Butler

The remaining original members, Iommi and Butler, began auditioning singers for the band's next release. Deep Purple and Whitesnake's David Coverdale, Samson's Nicky Moore and Lone Star's John Sloman were all considered, and Iommi states in his autobiography that Michael Bolton auditioned, though this claim has been disputed, with Butler suggesting that Iommi concocted the story as "a joke" and Bolton insisting it was "only a rumour". The band settled on then-former Deep Purple vocalist Ian Gillan to replace Dio in December 1982. The project was initially not to be called Black Sabbath, but pressure from the record label forced the group to retain the name. The band entered The Manor Studios in Shipton-on-Cherwell, Oxfordshire, in June 1983 with a returned and newly sober Bill Ward on drums. "That was the very first album that I ever did clean and sober," Ward recalled. "I only got drunk after I finished all my work on the album – which wasn't a very good idea... Sixty to seventy per cent of my energy was taken up on learning how to get through the day without taking a drink and learning how to do things without drinking, and thirty per cent of me was involved in the album."

Born Again (9 September 1983) was panned on release by critics. Despite this negative reception, it reached number four in the UK, and number 39 in the US. Even three decades after its release, AllMusic's Eduardo Rivadavia called the album "dreadful", noting that "Gillan's bluesy style and humorous lyrics were completely incompatible with the lords of doom and gloom".

Unable to tour because of the pressures of the road, Ward quit the band. "I fell apart with the idea of touring," he later explained. "I got so much fear behind touring, I didn't talk about the fear, I drank behind the fear instead and that was a big mistake." He was replaced by former Move and Electric Light Orchestra drummer Bev Bevan for the 1983–1984 Born Again world tour, (often unofficially referred to as the 'Feighn Death Sabbath '83–'84' World Tour) which began in Europe with Diamond Head, and later in the US with Quiet Riot and Night Ranger. The band headlined the 1983 Reading Festival in England, adding Deep Purple's "Smoke on the Water" to their encore.

The tour in support of Born Again included a giant set of the Stonehenge monument. In a move later parodied in the mockumentary This Is Spinal Tap, the band made a mistake in ordering the set piece. Butler explained:

We had Sharon Osbourne's dad, Don Arden, managing us. He came up with the idea of having the stage set be Stonehenge. He wrote the dimensions down and gave it to our tour manager. He wrote it down in metres but he meant to write it down in feet. The people who made it saw fifteen metres instead of fifteen feet. It was 45 feet high and it wouldn't fit on any stage anywhere so we just had to leave it in the storage area. It cost a fortune to make but there was not a building on earth that you could fit it into.

=== 1984–1987: Hiatus, Hughes as singer, Seventh Star, and Gillen as singer ===
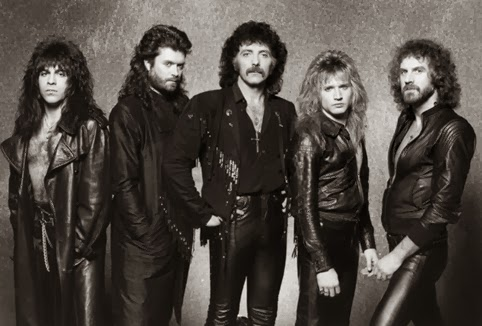
Black Sabbath in 1986. L-R: Dave Spitz, Glenn Hughes, Tony Iommi, Eric Singer, and Geoff Nicholls

Following the completion of the Born Again tour in March 1984, vocalist Ian Gillan left Black Sabbath to re-join Deep Purple, which was reforming after a long hiatus. Bevan left at the same time, and Gillan remarked that he and Bevan were made to feel like "hired help" by Iommi. The band then recruited an unknown Los Angeles vocalist named David Donato and Ward once again rejoined the band. The new line-up wrote and rehearsed throughout 1984, and eventually recorded a demo with producer Bob Ezrin in October. Unhappy with the results, the band parted ways with Donato shortly after. Disillusioned with the band's revolving line-up, Ward left shortly after stating "This isn't Black Sabbath". Butler would quit Sabbath next in November 1984 to form a solo band. "When Ian Gillan took over that was the end of it for me," he said. "I thought it was just a joke and I just totally left. When we got together with Gillan it was not supposed to be a Black Sabbath album. After we had done the album we gave it to Warner Bros. and they said they were going to put it out as a Black Sabbath album and we didn't have a leg to stand on. I got really disillusioned with it and Gillan was really pissed off about it. That lasted one album and one tour and then that was it."

Following both Ward's and Butler's exits, sole remaining original member Iommi put Sabbath on hiatus, and began work on a solo album with long-time Sabbath keyboardist Geoff Nicholls. While working on new material, the original Sabbath line-up agreed to a spot at Bob Geldof's Live Aid on 13 July 1985, performing at the Philadelphia show. This event – which also featured reunions of the Who and Led Zeppelin – marked the first time the original line-up had appeared on stage since 1978. "We were all drunk when we did Live Aid," recalled Geezer Butler, "but we'd all got drunk separately."

Returning to his solo work, Iommi enlisted bassist Dave Spitz (ex-Great White), drummer Eric Singer and initially intended to use multiple singers, including Rob Halford of Judas Priest, former Deep Purple and Trapeze vocalist Glenn Hughes, and former Sabbath vocalist Ronnie James Dio. This plan did not work as he forecasted. "We were going to use different vocalists on the album, guest vocalists, but it was so difficult getting it together and getting releases from their record companies. Glenn Hughes came along to sing on one track and we decided to use him on the whole album."

The band spent the remainder of the year in the studio, recording what would become Seventh Star (1986). Warner Bros. refused to release the album as a Tony Iommi solo release, instead insisting on using the name Black Sabbath. Pressured by the band's manager, Don Arden, the two compromised and released the album as "Black Sabbath featuring Tony Iommi" in January 1986. "It opened up a whole can of worms," Iommi explained. "If we could have done it as a solo album, it would have been accepted a lot more." Seventh Star sounded little like a Sabbath album, incorporating instead elements popularised by the 1980s Sunset Strip hard rock scene. It was panned by the critics of the era, although later reviewers such as AllMusic gave album verdicts, calling the album "often misunderstood and underrated".

The new line-up rehearsed for six weeks preparing for a full world tour, although the band were eventually forced to use the Sabbath name. "I was into the 'Tony Iommi project', but I wasn't into the Black Sabbath moniker," Hughes said. "The idea of being in Black Sabbath didn't appeal to me whatsoever. Glenn Hughes singing in Black Sabbath is like James Brown singing in Metallica. It wasn't gonna work." Just four days before the start of the tour, Hughes got into a bar fight with the band's production manager John Downing which splintered the singer's orbital bone. The injury interfered with Hughes' ability to sing, and the band brought in vocalist Ray Gillen to continue the tour with W.A.S.P. and Anthrax, although nearly half of the US dates would be cancelled because of poor ticket sales.

Black Sabbath began work on new material in October 1986 at AIR Studios in Montserrat with producer Jeff Glixman. The recording was fraught with problems from the beginning, as Glixman left after the initial sessions to be replaced by producer Vic Coppersmith-Heaven. Bassist Dave Spitz quit over "personal issues", and former Rainbow and Ozzy Osbourne bassist Bob Daisley was brought in. Daisley re-recorded all of the bass tracks, and wrote the album's lyrics, but before the album was complete, he left to join Gary Moore's backing band, taking drummer Eric Singer with him. After problems with second producer Coppersmith-Heaven, the band returned to Morgan Studios in England in January 1987 to work with new producer Chris Tsangarides. While working in the United Kingdom, new vocalist Ray Gillen abruptly left Black Sabbath to form Blue Murder with guitarist John Sykes (ex-Tygers of Pan Tang, Thin Lizzy, Whitesnake) and then Badlands with former Osbourne guitarist Jake E. Lee. The band auditioned a number of singers, including Jon Oliva of Savatage.

=== 1987–1990: Martin joins, The Eternal Idol, Headless Cross, and Tyr ===
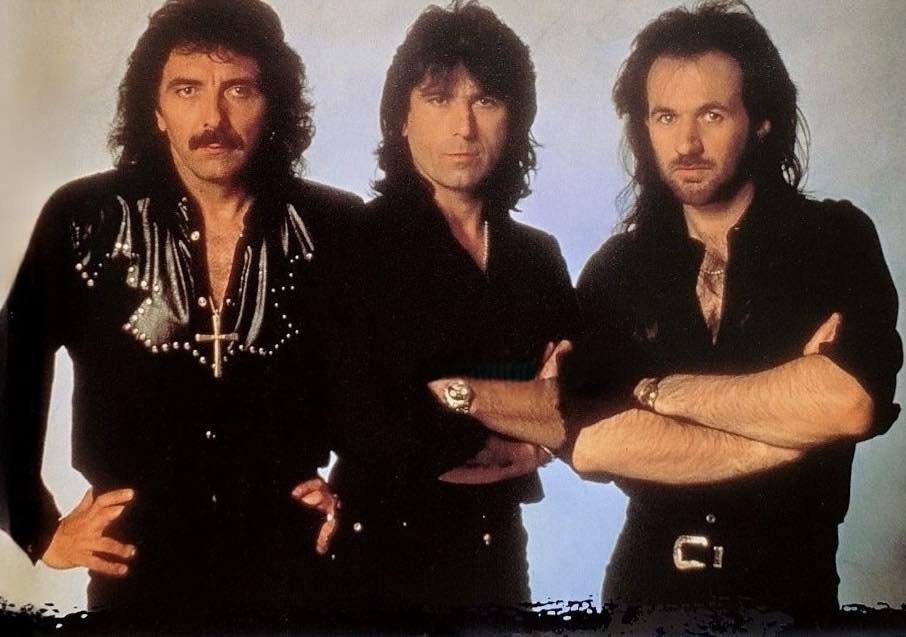
L-R: Tony Iommi, Cozy Powell, Tony Martin c. 1988

The band enlisted heavy metal vocalist Tony Martin to re-record Gillen's tracks, and Bevan rejoined to complete a few percussion overdubs. Before the release of the new album, Black Sabbath accepted an offer to play six shows at Sun City, South Africa, during the apartheid era. The band drew criticism from activists and artists involved with Artists United Against Apartheid, who had been boycotting South Africa since 1985. Bevan refused to play the shows, and was replaced by Terry Chimes, formerly of the Clash, while Dave Spitz returned on bass.

After nearly a year in production, The Eternal Idol was released in November 1987 and ignored by contemporary reviewers. On-line internet era reviews were mixed. AllMusic said that "Martin's powerful voice added new fire" to the band, and the album contained "some of Iommi's heaviest riffs in years". Blender gave the album two stars, claiming the album was "Black Sabbath in name only". The album would stall at No. 66 in the United Kingdom, while peaking at 168 in the US The band toured in support of Eternal Idol in Germany, Italy and for the first time, Greece. In part due to a backlash from promoters over the South Africa incident, other European shows were cancelled. Bassist Dave Spitz left the band again shortly before the tour, and was replaced by Jo Burt, formerly of Virginia Wolf.

Following the poor commercial performance of The Eternal Idol, Black Sabbath were dropped by both Vertigo Records and Warner Bros. Records, and signed with I.R.S. Records. The band took time off in 1988, returning in August to begin work on their next album. As a result of the recording troubles with Eternal Idol, Tony Iommi opted to produce the band's next album himself. "It was a completely new start", Iommi said. "I had to rethink the whole thing, and decided that we needed to build up some credibility again". Iommi enlisted former Rainbow drummer Cozy Powell, long-time keyboardist Nicholls and session bassist Laurence Cottle, and rented a "very cheap studio in England".

Black Sabbath released Headless Cross in April 1989, and it was also ignored by contemporary reviewers, although AllMusic contributor Eduardo Rivadavia gave the album four stars and called it "the finest non-Ozzy or Dio Black Sabbath album". Anchored by the number 62 charting single "Headless Cross", the album reached number 31 on the UK chart, and number 115 in the US Queen guitarist Brian May, a good friend of Iommi's, played a guest solo on the song "When Death Calls". Following the album's release the band added touring bassist Neil Murray, formerly of Colosseum II, National Health, Whitesnake, Gary Moore's backing band, and Vow Wow.

The unsuccessful Headless Cross US tour began in May 1989 with openers Kingdom Come and Silent Rage, but because of poor ticket sales, the tour was cancelled after just eight shows. The European leg of the tour began in September, where the band were enjoying chart success. After a string of Japanese shows the band embarked on a 23 date Russian tour with Girlschool. Black Sabbath were one of the first bands to tour Russia, after Mikhail Gorbachev opened the country to western acts for the first time in 1989.

The band returned to the studio in February 1990 to record Tyr, the follow-up to Headless Cross. While not technically a concept album, some of the album's lyrical themes are loosely based on Norse mythology. Tyr was released on 6 August 1990, reaching number 24 on the UK albums chart, but was the first Black Sabbath release not to break the Billboard 200 in the US The album would receive mixed internet-era reviews, with AllMusic noting that the band "mix myth with metal in a crushing display of musical synthesis", while Blender gave the album just one star, claiming that "Iommi continues to besmirch the Sabbath name with this unremarkable collection". The band toured in support of Tyr with Circus of Power in Europe, but the final seven United Kingdom dates were cancelled because of poor ticket sales. For the first time in their career, the band's touring cycle did not include US dates.

=== 1990–1992: Dio rejoins and Dehumanizer ===
While on his Lock Up the Wolves US tour in August 1990, former Sabbath vocalist Ronnie James Dio was joined onstage at the Roy Wilkins Auditorium by Geezer Butler to perform "Neon Knights". Following the show, the two expressed interest in rejoining Sabbath. Butler convinced Iommi, who in turn broke up the current line-up, dismissing vocalist Tony Martin and bassist Neil Murray. "I do regret that in a lot of ways," Iommi said. "We were at a good point then. We decided to [reunite with Dio] and I don't even know why, really. There's the financial aspect, but that wasn't it. I seemed to think maybe we could recapture something we had."

Dio and Butler joined Iommi and Cozy Powell in autumn 1990 to begin the next Sabbath release. While rehearsing in November, Powell suffered a broken hip when his horse died and fell on the drummer's legs. Unable to complete the album, Powell was replaced by former drummer Vinny Appice, reuniting the Mob Rules line-up, and the band entered the studio with producer Reinhold Mack. The year-long recording was plagued with problems, primarily stemming from writing tension between Iommi and Dio. Songs were rewritten multiple times. "It was just hard work," Iommi said. "We took too long on it, that album cost us a million dollars, which is bloody ridiculous." Dio recalled the album as difficult, but worth the effort: "It was something we had to really wring out of ourselves, but I think that's why it works. Sometimes you need that kind of tension, or else you end up making the Christmas album".

The resulting Dehumanizer was released on 22 June 1992. In the US, the album was released on 30 June 1992 by Reprise Records, as Dio and his namesake band were still under contract to the label at the time. While the album received mixed reviews, it was the band's biggest commercial success in a decade. Anchored by the top 40 rock radio single "TV Crimes", the album peaked at number 44 on the Billboard 200. The album also featured "Time Machine", a version of which had been recorded for the 1992 film Wayne's World. Additionally, the perception among fans of a return of some semblance of the "real" Sabbath provided the band with much needed momentum.

Sabbath began touring in support of Dehumanizer in July 1992 with Testament, Danzig, Prong, Exodus, and Sepultura. While on tour, former vocalist Ozzy Osbourne announced his first retirement, and invited Sabbath to open for his solo band at the final two shows of his farewell tour in Costa Mesa, California. The band agreed, aside from Dio, who told Iommi, "I'm not doing that. I'm not supporting a clown." Dio spoke of the situation years later:

I was told in the middle of the tour that we would be opening for Ozzy in Los Angeles. And I said, "No. Sorry, I have more pride than that." A lot of bad things were being said from camp to camp, and it created this horrible schism. So by [the band] agreeing to play the shows in L.A. with Ozzy, that, to me, spelled out reunion. And that obviously meant the doom of that particular project.

Dio quit Sabbath following a show in Oakland, California on 13 November 1992, one night before the band were set to appear at Osbourne's retirement show. Rob Halford (who had recently left Judas Priest) stepped in at the last minute, performing two nights with the band. Iommi and Butler joined Osbourne and former drummer Ward on stage for the first time since 1985's Live Aid concert, performing a brief set of Sabbath songs. This set the stage for a longer-term reunion of the original line-up, though that plan proved short-lived. "Ozzy, Geezer, Tony and Bill announced the reunion of Black Sabbath – again," remarked Dio. "And I thought that it was a great idea. But I guess Ozzy didn't think it was such a great idea... I'm never surprised when it comes to whatever happens with them. Never at all. They are very predictable. They don't talk."

=== 1992–1997: Martin rejoins, Cross Purposes, and Forbidden ===
Drummer Vinny Appice left the band following the reunion show to rejoin Ronnie James Dio's solo band, later appearing on Dio's Strange Highways and Angry Machines. Iommi and Butler enlisted former Rainbow drummer Bobby Rondinelli, and reinstated former vocalist Tony Martin. The band returned to the studio to work on new material, although the project was not originally intended to be released under the Black Sabbath name. As Geezer Butler explains:

It wasn't even supposed to be a Sabbath album; I wouldn't have even done it under the pretence of Sabbath. That was the time when the original band were talking about getting back together for a reunion tour. Tony and myself just went in with a couple of people, did an album just to have, while the reunion tour was (supposedly) going on. It was like an Iommi/Butler project album.

Under pressure from their record label, the band released their seventeenth studio album, Cross Purposes, on 8 February 1994, under the Black Sabbath name. The album received mixed reviews, with Blender giving the album two stars, calling Soundgarden's 1994 album Superunknown "a far better Sabbath album than this by-the-numbers potboiler". AllMusic's Bradley Torreano called Cross Purposes "the first album since Born Again that actually sounds like a real Sabbath record". The album just missed the Top 40 in the UK reaching number 41, and also reached 122 on the Billboard 200 in the US Cross Purposes contained the song "Evil Eye", which was co-written by Van Halen guitarist Eddie Van Halen, although uncredited because of record label restrictions. Touring in support of Cross Purposes began in February with Morbid Angel and Motörhead in the US The band filmed a live performance at the Hammersmith Apollo on 13 April 1994, which was released on VHS accompanied by a CD, titled Cross Purposes Live. After the European tour with Cathedral and Godspeed in June 1994, drummer Bobby Rondinelli quit the band and was replaced by original Black Sabbath drummer Ward for five shows in South America.

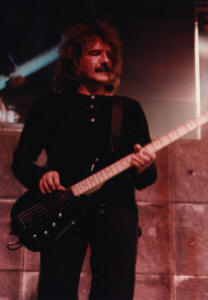
Geezer Butler performing with Black Sabbath in 1995

Following the touring cycle for Cross Purposes, bassist Geezer Butler quit the band for the second time. "I finally got totally disillusioned with the last Sabbath album, and I much preferred the stuff I was writing to the stuff Sabbath were doing". Butler formed a solo project called GZR, and released Plastic Planet in 1995. The album contained the song "Giving Up the Ghost", which was critical of Tony Iommi for carrying on with the Black Sabbath name, with the lyrics: You plagiarised and parodied / the magic of our meaning / a legend in your own mind / left all your friends behind / you can't admit that you're wrong / the spirit is dead and gone ("I heard it's something about me..." said Iommi. "I had the album given to me a while back. I played it once, then somebody else had it, so I haven't really paid any attention to the lyrics... It's nice to see him doing his own thing – getting things off his chest. I don't want to get into a rift with Geezer. He's still a friend."

Following Butler's departure, newly returned drummer Ward once again left the band. Iommi reinstated former members Neil Murray on bass and Cozy Powell on drums, effectively reuniting the 1990 Tyr line-up. The band enlisted Body Count guitarist Ernie C to produce the new album, which was recorded in London in autumn of 1994. The album featured a guest vocal on "Illusion of Power" by Body Count vocalist Ice-T. The resulting Forbidden was released on 8 June 1995, but failed to chart in the US The album was widely panned by critics; AllMusic's Bradley Torreano said "with boring songs, awful production, and uninspired performances, this is easily avoidable for all but the most enthusiastic fan"; while Blender magazine called Forbidden "an embarrassment... the band's worst album".

Black Sabbath embarked on a world tour in July 1995 with openers Motörhead and Tiamat, but two months into the tour, drummer Cozy Powell left the band, citing health issues, and was replaced by former drummer Bobby Rondinelli. "The members I had in the last lineup – Bobby Rondinelli, Neil Murray – they're great, great characters..." Iommi told Sabbath fanzine Southern Cross. "That, for me, was an ideal lineup. I wasn't sure vocally what we should do, but Neil Murray and Bobby Rondinelli I really got on well with."

After completing Asian dates in December 1995, Tony Iommi put the band on hiatus, and began work on a solo album with former Black Sabbath vocalist Glenn Hughes, and former Judas Priest drummer Dave Holland. The album was not officially released following its completion, although a widely traded bootleg called Eighth Star surfaced soon after. The album was officially released in 2004 as The 1996 DEP Sessions, with Holland's drums re-recorded by session drummer Jimmy Copley.

In 1997, Tony Iommi disbanded the current line-up to officially reunite with Ozzy Osbourne and the original Black Sabbath line-up. Vocalist Tony Martin claimed that an original line-up reunion had been in the works since the band's brief reunion at Ozzy Osbourne's 1992 Costa Mesa show, and that the band released subsequent albums to fulfill their record contract with I.R.S. Records. Martin later recalled Forbidden as a "filler album that got the band out of the label deal, rid of the singer, and into the reunion. However I wasn't privy to that information at the time". I.R.S. Records released a compilation album in 1996 to fulfill the band's contract, titled The Sabbath Stones, which featured songs from Born Again (1983) to Forbidden.

=== 1997–2006: Osbourne rejoins and Reunion ===
In the summer of 1997, Iommi, Butler and Osbourne reunited to coheadline the Ozzfest tour alongside Osbourne's solo band. The line-up featured Osbourne's drummer Mike Bordin filling in for Ward. "It started off with me going off to join Ozzy for a couple of numbers," explained Iommi, "and then it got into Sabbath doing a short set, involving Geezer. And then it grew as it went on... We were concerned in case Bill couldn't make it – couldn't do it – because it was a lot of dates, and important dates... The only rehearsal that we had to do was for the drummer. But I think if Bill had come in, it would have took a lot more time. We would have had to focus a lot more on him."

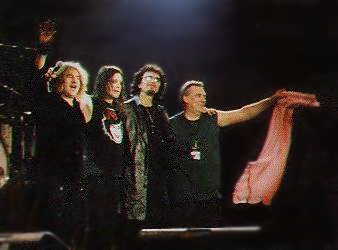
Black Sabbath on stage in Stuttgart in December 1999 (left to right: Butler, Osbourne, Iommi, Ward)

In December 1997, the group was joined by Ward, marking the first reunion of the original quartet since Osbourne's 1992 "retirement show". This line-up recorded two shows at the Birmingham NEC, released as the double album Reunion on 20 October 1998. The album reached number eleven on the Billboard 200, went platinum in the US and spawned the single "Iron Man", which won Sabbath their first Grammy Award in 2000 for Best Metal Performance, 30 years after the song was originally released. Reunion featured two new studio tracks, "Psycho Man" and "Selling My Soul", both of which cracked the top 20 of the Billboard Mainstream Rock Tracks chart.

Shortly before a European tour in the summer of 1998, Ward had a heart attack and was temporarily replaced by former drummer Vinny Appice. Ward returned for a US tour with openers Pantera, which began in January 1999 and continued through the summer, headlining the annual Ozzfest tour. Following these appearances, the band was put on hiatus while members worked on solo material. Iommi released his first official solo album, Iommi, in 2000, while Osbourne continued work on Down to Earth (2001).

Sabbath returned to the studio to work on new material with all four original members and producer Rick Rubin in the spring of 2001, but the sessions were halted when Osbourne was called away to finish tracks for his solo album in the summer. "It just came to an end..." Iommi said. "It's a shame because [the songs] were really good". Iommi commented on the difficulty getting all the members together to work:

It's quite different recording now. We've all done so much in between. In [the early] days there was no mobile phone ringing every five seconds. When we first started, we had nothing. We all worked for the same thing. Now everybody has done so many other things. It's great fun and we all have a good chat, but it's just different, trying to put an album together.

In March 2002, Osbourne's Emmy-winning reality show The Osbournes debuted on MTV, and quickly became a worldwide hit. The show introduced Osbourne to a broader audience and, to capitalise, the band's back catalogue label Sanctuary Records released a double live album, Past Lives (2002), which featured concert material recorded in the 1970s, including the Live at Last (1980) album. The band remained on hiatus until the summer of 2004 when they returned to headline Ozzfest 2004 and 2005. In November 2005, Black Sabbath were inducted into the UK Music Hall of Fame, and in March 2006, after eleven years of eligibility—Osbourne famously refused the Hall's "meaningless" initial nomination in 1999—the band were inducted into the US Rock and Roll Hall of Fame. At the awards ceremony Metallica played two Sabbath songs, "Hole in the Sky" and "Iron Man" in tribute.

=== 2006–2010: The Dio Years and Heaven and Hell ===
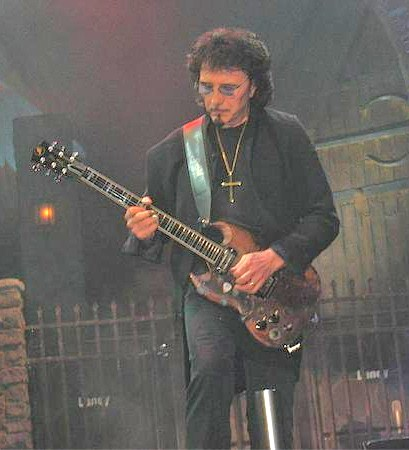
Tony Iommi in 2007 with Heaven & Hell

While Ozzy Osbourne was working on new solo album material in 2006, Rhino Records released Black Sabbath: The Dio Years, a compilation of songs culled from the four Black Sabbath releases featuring Ronnie James Dio. For the release, Iommi, Butler, Dio, and Appice reunited to write and record three new songs as Black Sabbath. The Dio Years was released on 3 April 2007, reaching number 54 on the Billboard 200, while the single "The Devil Cried" reached number 37 on the Mainstream Rock Tracks chart. Pleased with the results, Iommi and Dio decided to reunite the Dio era line-up for a world tour. While the line-up of Osbourne, Butler, Iommi, and Ward was still officially called Black Sabbath, the new line-up opted to call themselves Heaven & Hell, after the album of the same title, to avoid confusion. When asked about the name of the group, Iommi stated "it really is Black Sabbath, whatever we do... so everyone knows what they're getting [and] so people won't expect to hear 'Iron Man' and all those songs. We've done them for so many years, it's nice to do just all the stuff we did with Ronnie again." Ward was initially set to participate, but dropped out before the tour began due to musical differences with "a couple of the band members". He was replaced by former drummer Vinny Appice, effectively reuniting the line-up that had featured on the Mob Rules (1981) and Dehumanizer (1992) albums.

Heaven & Hell toured the US with openers Megadeth and Machine Head, and recorded a live album and DVD in New York on 30 March 2007, titled Live from Radio City Music Hall. In November 2007, Dio confirmed that the band had plans to record a new studio album, which was recorded in the following year. In April 2008 the band announced the upcoming release of a new box set and their participation in the Metal Masters Tour, alongside Judas Priest, Motörhead and Testament. The box set, The Rules of Hell, featuring remastered versions of all the Dio fronted Black Sabbath albums, was supported by the Metal Masters Tour. In 2009, the band announced the title of their debut studio album, The Devil You Know, released on 28 April.

On 26 May 2009, Osbourne filed suit in a federal court in New York against Iommi alleging that he illegally claimed the band name. Iommi noted that he had been the only constant band member for its full 41-year career and that his bandmates relinquished their rights to the name in the 1980s, therefore claiming more rights to the name of the band. Although in the suit, Osbourne was seeking 50% ownership of the trademark, he said that he hoped the proceedings would lead to equal ownership among the four original members.

In March 2010, Black Sabbath announced that along with Metallica they would be releasing a limited edition single together to celebrate Record Store Day. It was released on 17 April 2010. Ronnie James Dio died on 16 May 2010 from stomach cancer. In June 2010, the legal battle between Ozzy Osbourne and Tony Iommi over the trademarking of the Black Sabbath name ended, but the terms of the settlement have not been disclosed.

=== 2010–2014: Second Osbourne reunion and 13 ===
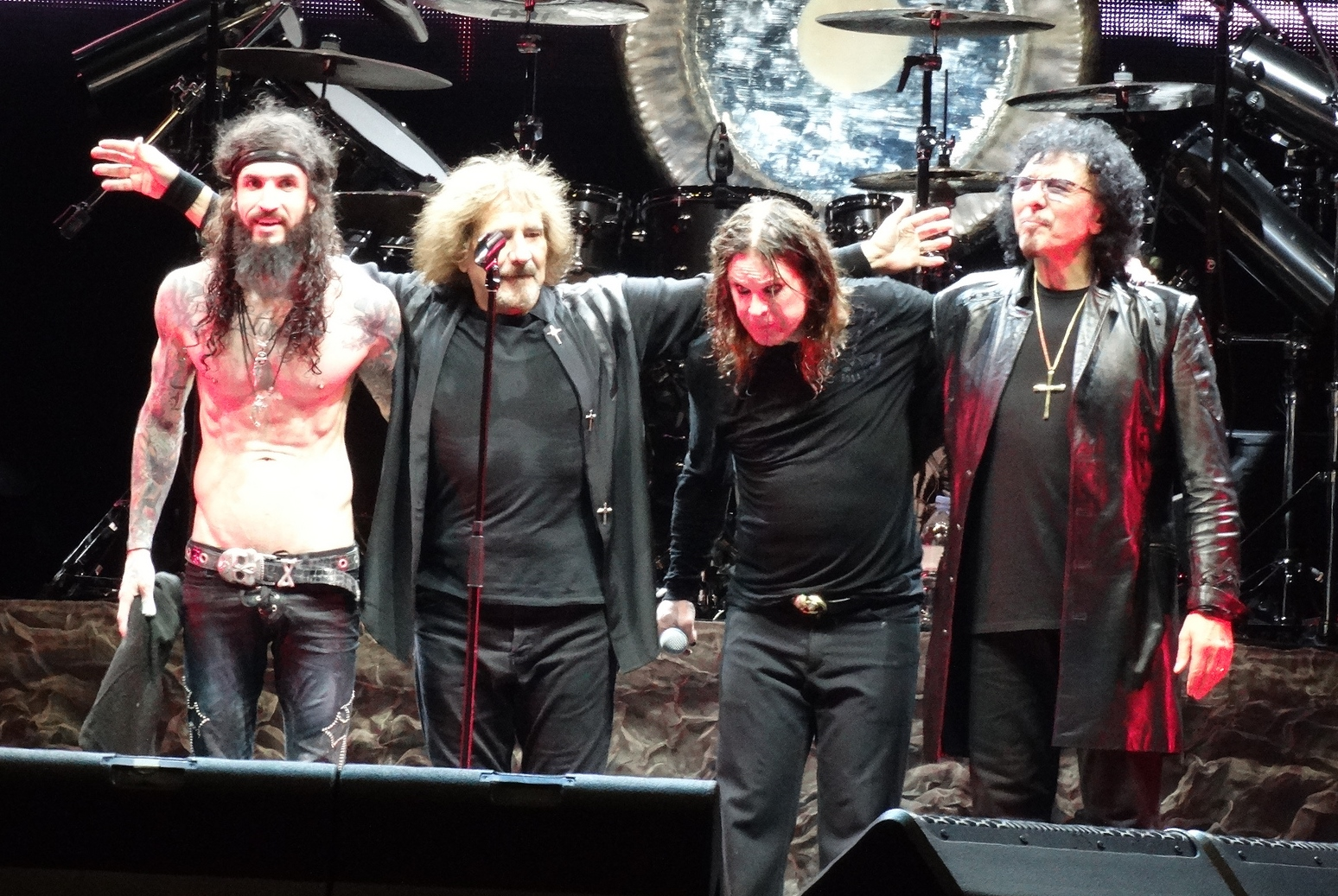
Black Sabbath live in Brazil, 2013 (left to right: Tommy Clufetos, Butler, Osbourne, Iommi)

In a January 2010 interview while promoting his biography I Am Ozzy, Osbourne stated that although he would not rule it out, he was doubtful there would be a reunion with all four original members of the band. Osbourne stated: "I'm not gonna say I've written it out forever, but right now I don't think there's any chance. But who knows what the future holds for me? If it's my destiny, fine." In July, Butler said that there would be no reunion in 2011, as Osbourne was already committed to touring with his solo band. However, by that August they had already met up to rehearse together, and continued to do so through the autumn. On 11 November 2011, Iommi, Butler, Osbourne, and Ward announced that they were reuniting to record a new album with a full tour in support beginning in 2012. Iommi was diagnosed with lymphoma on 9 January 2012, which forced the band to cancel all but two shows (Download Festival and Lollapalooza Festival) of a previously booked European tour. It was later announced that an intimate show would be played in their hometown Birmingham. It was the first concert since the reunion and the only indoors concerts that year. In February 2012, drummer Ward announced that he would not participate further in the band's reunion until he was offered a "signable contract".

On 21 May 2012, at the O2 Academy in Birmingham, Black Sabbath played their first concert since 2005, with Tommy Clufetos playing the drums. In June, they performed at the Download Festival at the Donington Park motorsports circuit in Leicestershire, England, followed by the last concert of the short tour at Lollapalooza Festival in Chicago. Later that month, the band started recording an album. On 13 January 2013, the band announced that the album would be released in June under the title 13. Brad Wilk (formerly of Rage Against the Machine and Audioslave) was chosen as the drummer, and Rick Rubin was chosen as the producer. Mixing of the album commenced in February. On 12 April 2013, the band released the album's track listing. The standard version of the album features eight new tracks, and the deluxe version features three bonus tracks.

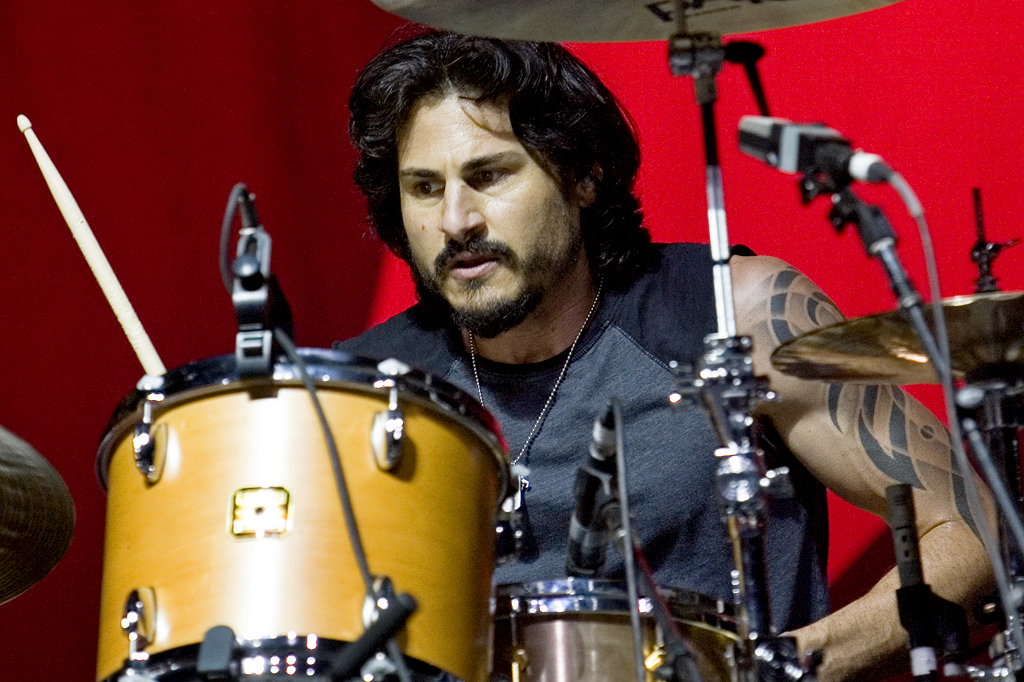
Brad Wilk performed as a session drummer on Black Sabbath's final studio album 13 (2013).

The band's first single from 13, "God Is Dead?", was released on 19 April 2013. On 20 April 2013, Black Sabbath commenced their first Australia/New Zealand tour in 40 years followed by a North American Tour in Summer 2013. The second single of the album, "End of the Beginning", debuted on 15 May in a CSI: Crime Scene Investigation episode, where all three members appeared. In June 2013, 13 topped both the UK Albums Chart and the US Billboard 200, becoming their first album to reach number one on the latter chart. In 2014, Black Sabbath received their first Grammy Award since 2000 with "God Is Dead?" winning Best Metal Performance.

In July 2013, Black Sabbath embarked on a North American Tour (for the first time since July 2001), followed by a Latin American tour in October 2013. In November 2013, the band started their European tour which lasted until December 2013. In March and April 2014, they made 12 stops in North America (mostly in Canada) as the second leg of their North American Tour before embarking in June 2014 on the second leg of their European tour, which ended with a concert at London's Hyde Park.

=== 2014–2017: Aborted twentieth album, The End, and disbandment ===
On 29 September 2014, Osbourne told Metal Hammer that Black Sabbath would begin work on their twentieth studio album in early 2015 with producer Rick Rubin, followed by a final tour in 2016. In an April 2015 interview, however, Osbourne said that these plans "could change", and added, "We all live in different countries and some of them want to work and some of them don't want to, I believe. But we are going to do another tour together."

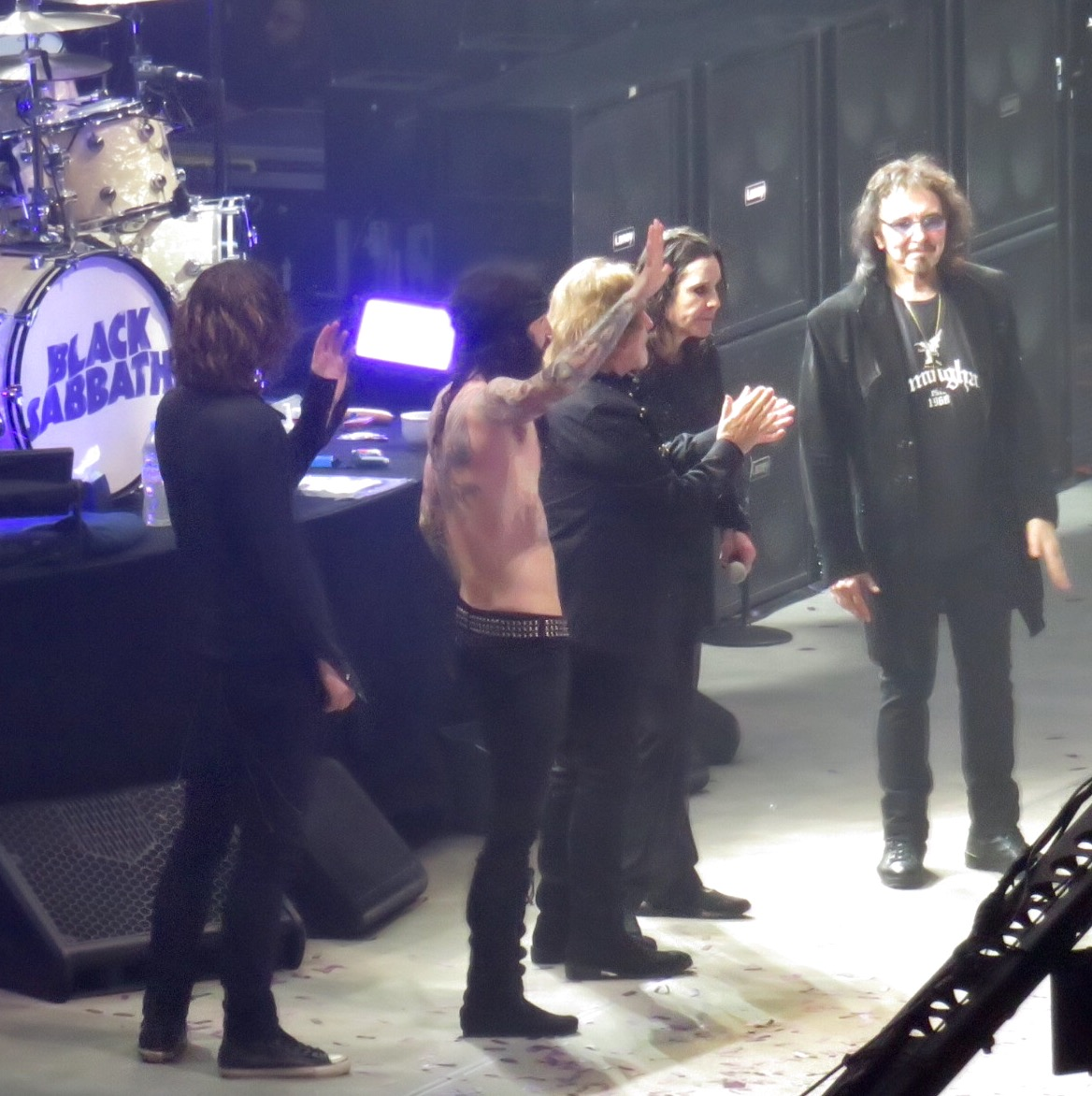
Black Sabbath at the Genting Arena, Birmingham, in February 2017

On 3 September 2015, it was announced that Black Sabbath would embark on their final tour, titled The End, from January 2016 to February 2017. Numerous dates and locations across the US, Canada, Europe, Australia and New Zealand were announced. The final shows of The End tour took place at the Genting Arena in their home city of Birmingham, England on 2 and 4 February 2017. On 26 October 2015, it was announced the band consisting of Osbourne, Iommi and Butler would be returning to the Download Festival on 11 June 2016. Despite earlier reports that they would enter the studio before their farewell tour, Osbourne stated that there would not be another Black Sabbath studio album. However, an 8-track CD entitled The End was sold at dates on the tour. Along with some live recordings, the CD includes four unused tracks from the 13 sessions.

On 4 March 2016, Iommi discussed future re-releases of the Tony Martin-era catalogue: "We've held back on the reissues of those albums because of the current Sabbath thing with Ozzy Osbourne, but they will certainly be happening... I'd like to do a couple of new tracks for those releases with Tony Martin... I'll also be looking at working on Cross Purposes and Forbidden." Martin had suggested that this could coincide with the 30th anniversary of The Eternal Idol, in 2017. In an interview that August, Martin added "[Iommi] still has his cancer issues of course and that may well stop it all from happening but if he wants to do something I am ready." On 10 August 2016, Iommi revealed that his cancer was in remission.

Asked in November 2016 about his plans after Black Sabbath's final tour, Iommi replied, "I'll be doing some writing. Maybe I'll be doing something with the guys, maybe in the studio, but no touring." The band played their final concert on 4 February 2017 in Birmingham. The final song was streamed live on the band's Facebook page and fireworks went off as the band took their final bow. The band's final tour was not an easy one, as longstanding tensions between Osbourne and Iommi returned to the surface. Iommi stated that he would not rule out the possibility of one-off shows, "I wouldn't write that off, if one day that came about. That's possible. Or even doing an album, 'cause then, again, you're in one place. But I don't know if that would happen." In an April 2017 interview, Butler revealed that Black Sabbath had considered making a blues album as the follow-up to 13, but added that, "the tour got in the way."

On 7 March 2017, Black Sabbath announced their disbandment through posts made on their official social media accounts.

=== 2017–2024: Post-final tour activities ===
In a June 2018 interview with ITV News, Osbourne expressed interest in reuniting with Black Sabbath for a performance at the 2022 Commonwealth Games which would be held in their home city Birmingham. Iommi said that performing at the event as Black Sabbath would be "a great thing to do to help represent Birmingham. I'm up for it. Let's see what happens." He also did not rule out the possibility for the band to reform only for a one-off performance rather than a full-length tour. Iommi was later announced to be part of the opening ceremony for the 2022 Commonwealth Games alongside Duran Duran. On 8 August 2022, Osbourne and Iommi made a surprise reunion to end the closing ceremony of the 2022 Commonwealth Games at the Alexander Stadium in Birmingham. They were joined by 2017 Black Sabbath touring musicians Tommy Clufetos and Adam Wakeman for a medley of "Iron Man" and "Paranoid".

In September 2020, Osbourne stated in an interview that he was no longer interested in a reunion: "Not for me. It's done. The only thing I do regret is not doing the last farewell show in Birmingham with Bill Ward. I felt really bad about that. It would have been so nice. I don't know what the circumstances behind it were, but it would have been nice. I've talked to Tony a few times, but I don't have any of the slightest interest in doing another gig. Maybe Tony's getting bored now." Butler also ruled out the possibility of any future Black Sabbath performances in an interview with Eonmusic on 10 November 2020, stating that the band were over: "There will definitely be no more Sabbath. It's done." Iommi however, pondered the possibility of another reunion tour in an interview with The Mercury News, stating that he "would like to play with the guys again" and that he missed the audiences and stage. Ward stated in an interview with Eddie Trunk that he no longer had the ability or chops to perform with Black Sabbath in concert, but expressed that he would love to make another album with Osbourne, Butler and Iommi.

Despite ruling out the possibility of another Black Sabbath reunion, Osbourne revealed in an episode of Ozzy Speaks on Ozzy's Boneyard that he was working with Iommi, who appeared as one of the guests for his thirteenth and final solo album, Patient Number 9 (2022). In an October 2021 interview with the Metro, Ward revealed that he had kept "in contact" with his former bandmates and stated that he was "very open-minded" to the possibility of recording another Black Sabbath album: "I haven't spoken to the guys about it, but I have talked to a couple of people in management about the possibility of making a recording."

On 30 September 2020, Black Sabbath announced a new Dr. Martens shoe collection. The partnership with the British footwear company celebrated the 50th anniversaries of the band's Black Sabbath and Paranoid albums, with the boots depicting artwork from the former. On 13 January 2021, the band announced that they would reissue both Heaven & Hell and Mob Rules as expanded deluxe editions on 5 March 2021, with unreleased material included.

In September 2022, Osbourne reiterated that he was unwilling to reunite with Black Sabbath, stating that if the band were to make another album, he would not sing on it. However, he remained open to working with Iommi on more solo projects following the latter's involvement on Patient Number 9. Osbourne later retired from touring in February 2023 after not sufficiently recovering from medical treatment, putting the possibility of another Black Sabbath reunion in concert in further doubt. Butler, who had retired in June 2023, insisted that Black Sabbath had been "put to bed", until August 2023 when he stated that he was open to performing a one-off show, but expressed that he had "no desire to tour again" with Black Sabbath. According to Iommi, the band were offered, but turned down, a reunion at Power Trip in October 2023, where Osbourne was initially scheduled to headline the festival's second date; he eventually cancelled his appearance and was replaced by Judas Priest, due to health issues. In May 2024, Osbourne renewed interest in a reunion of the original line-up, admitting he was sad that Ward was not part of the final tour and that "it wasn't Black Sabbath that finished it. It's unfinished. If they wanted to do one more gig with Bill, I would jump at the chance." Iommi, Butler and Ward all later expressed interest in the possibility of a one-off reunion show featuring the original line-up.

The Birmingham Royal Ballet presented Black Sabbath: The Ballet which premiered at the Birmingham Hippodrome in September 2023, before touring to Theatre Royal, Plymouth and Sadler's Wells Theatre in October.

A box set of Tony Martin-era albums, Anno Domini 1989–1995, was released on 31 May 2024 and includes remasters of Headless Cross, Tyr and Cross Purposes and a remixed version of Forbidden; each disc of the box set (except Tyr) includes one bonus track.

=== 2025: Final reunion and death of Osbourne ===
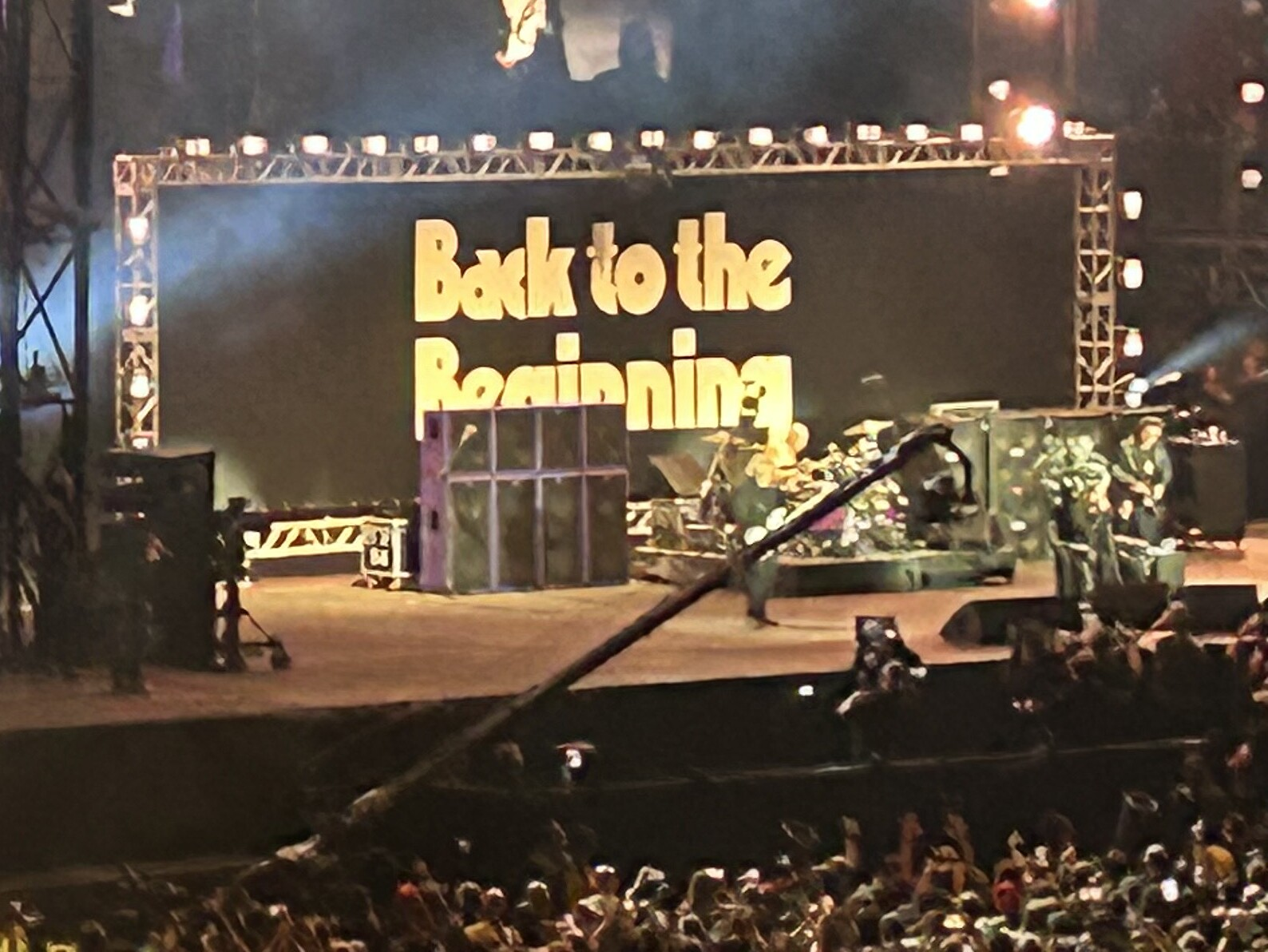
Black Sabbath performing their final show, titled Back to the Beginning, on 5 July 2025

On 5 February 2025, Osbourne announced that the original line-up of Black Sabbath would reform for one final charity show at Villa Park, Birmingham on 5 July. Titled Back to the Beginning, it was the final gig for both Osbourne and the group. It was Black Sabbath's first concert in eight years and also marked the first time in twenty years that the original line-up of the band had performed together. Proceeds from the show went to support Cure Parkinsons, Birmingham Children's Hospital and Acorns Children's Hospice. Tom Morello was the show's musical director. Osbourne said, "I'm not going to get up there and do a half-hearted Ozzy looking for sympathy. What's the fucking point in that? I'm not going up there in a fucking wheelchair." In addition to a solo performance by Osbourne, the supporting acts for the show included Metallica, Guns N' Roses, Tool, Slayer, Pantera, Gojira, Alice in Chains, Halestorm, Lamb of God, Anthrax, Mastodon and Rival Sons, and included "additional performances from" Morello, Steven Tyler, Billy Corgan, Slash, David Draiman, Sammy Hagar, Fred Durst, former Judas Priest guitarist K. K. Downing, former Megadeth bassist David Ellefson, and three former members of Osbourne's solo band (Rudy Sarzo, Jake E. Lee and Mike Bordin). Despite being billed as a final concert, Iommi, Butler and Ward did not rule out recording new music as Black Sabbath. A 100-minute concert film of the show, titled Back to the Beginning: Ozzy's Final Bow, was scheduled for a theatrical release in early 2026, with plans to release it on DVD and Blu-ray later on. After some delays, the film was released on 28 October 2026, while its soundtrack album, titled Ozzy Osbourne & Black Sabbath: Back to the Beginning, is due for release on 11 December 2026.

One week before the concert, the four original band members were made Freemen of the City of Birmingham. Run by Central BID, the event was supported by two exhibitions. One was in Victoria Square, in place from 25 June to 28 September, featuring boards showcasing the band's origins, history, success, as well as album covers and unseen photos of the group. The other was a painted mural on the wall on Navigation Street, on the bridge over the track entering Birmingham New Street station.

Osbourne died of a heart attack on 22 July 2025, seventeen days after his final performance. Eight days later, on 30 July, his funeral procession passed through Broad Street, stopping at Black Sabbath Bridge, for Sharon Osbourne and family to mourn and read messages left by supporters. A documentary, Ozzy Osbourne: No Escape from Now, was streamed on Paramount+ on 7 October 2025, covering the final six years of Osbourne's life including his final performance with Black Sabbath. The documentary was in the works prior to Osbourne's death.

== Artistry ==
=== Musical style ===
Black Sabbath have been cited as not only pioneers of heavy metal, but inventors of the genre. David Slavković of Ultimate Guitar specifies that heavy metal songs, such as "Helter Skelter" by the Beatles, "Born to Be Wild" by Steppenwolf and much of Led Zeppelin's self-titled debut album, did exist beforehand, but Black Sabbath were the first band to embrace the genre on an album-wide scale. Despite this, critics also describe their musical style as hard rock, acid rock and occult rock, while the band themselves called it "heavy rock." Another genre that Black Sabbath have been credited with inventing is doom metal, particularly with the song "Black Sabbath" and Iommi's downtuned riffs. However, many argue they are a proto-doom band who is more bluesy than the heavier, slower bands they influenced.

Although Black Sabbath went through many line-ups and stylistic changes, their core sound focused on ominous lyrics and doomy music, often making use of the musical tritone, also called the "devil's interval". Their dark sound was dismissed by rock critics of the early 1970s, and like many of their early heavy metal contemporaries, Black Sabbath received virtually no airplay on rock radio. However, later Ozzy-era albums such as Sabbath Bloody Sabbath (1973) and Sabotage (1975) drew influence from progressive rock, which was growing in popularity at the time.

As the band's primary songwriter, Tony Iommi wrote the majority of Black Sabbath's music, while Osbourne would write vocal melodies, and bassist Geezer Butler would write lyrics. The process was sometimes frustrating for Iommi, who often felt pressured to come up with new material: "If I didn't come up with anything, nobody would do anything." On Iommi's influence, Osbourne later said:

Black Sabbath never used to write a structured song. There'd be a long intro that would go into a jazz piece, then go all folky... and it worked. Tony Iommi—and I have said this a zillion times—should be up there with the greats. He can pick up a guitar, play a riff, and you say, "He's gotta be out now, he can't top that." Then you come back, and I bet you a billion dollars, he'd come up with a riff that'd knock your fucking socks off.

Beginning with their third album, Master of Reality (1971), Black Sabbath began to feature tuned-down guitars. In 1965, before forming Black Sabbath, guitarist Tony Iommi suffered an accident while working in a sheet metal factory, losing the tips of two fingers on his right hand. Iommi almost gave up music, but was urged by the factory manager to listen to Django Reinhardt, a jazz guitarist who lost the use of two fingers in a fire. Inspired by Reinhardt, Iommi created two thimbles made of plastic and leather to cap off his missing fingertips. The guitarist began using lighter strings, and detuning his guitar, to press the strings with his prosthesis more comfortably. Early in the band's history Iommi experimented with different dropped tunings, including C♯ tuning, or 3 semitones down, before settling on E♭/D♯ tuning, or a half-step down from standard tuning.

=== Influences ===
Early on, Black Sabbath were influenced by Cream, the Beatles, Fleetwood Mac, Jimi Hendrix, John Mayall & the Bluesbreakers, Blue Cheer, Golden Earring, Led Zeppelin, Jethro Tull, and Iron Butterfly.

== Legacy ==
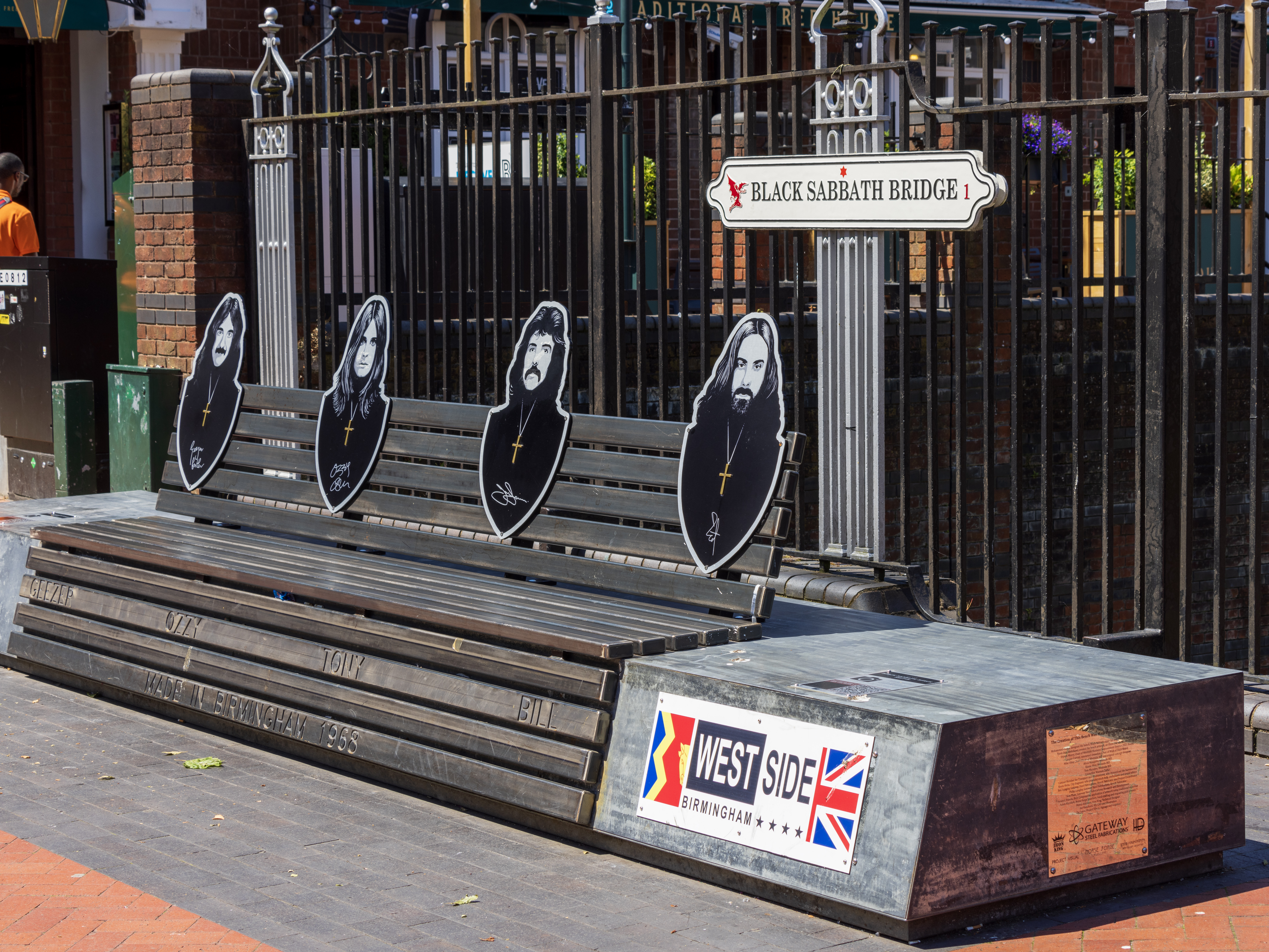
Black Sabbath bench on Black Sabbath Bridge on Broad Street in the band's home city Birmingham

Black Sabbath have sold over 70 million records worldwide, including a RIAA-certified 15 million in the US. They are one of the most influential heavy metal bands of all time. The band helped to create the genre with groundbreaking releases such as Paranoid (1970), an album that Rolling Stone magazine said "changed music forever", calling them "the Beatles of heavy metal". Time magazine called Paranoid "the birthplace of heavy metal", placing it in their Top 100 Albums of All Time.

MTV placed Black Sabbath at number one on their Top Ten Heavy Metal Bands and VH1 placed them at number two on their list of the 100 Greatest Artists of Hard Rock. VH1 ranked Black Sabbath's "Iron Man" the number one song on their 40 Greatest Metal Songs countdown. Rolling Stone magazine ranked the band number 85 in their list of the "100 Greatest Artists of All Time". AllMusic's William Ruhlmann said:

Black Sabbath has been so influential in the development of heavy metal rock music as to be a defining force in the style. The group took the blues-rock sound of late '60s acts like Cream, Blue Cheer, and Vanilla Fudge to its logical conclusion, slowing the tempo, accentuating the bass, and emphasising screaming guitar solos and howled vocals full of lyrics expressing mental anguish and macabre fantasies. If their predecessors clearly came out of an electrified blues tradition, Black Sabbath took that tradition in a new direction, and in so doing helped give birth to a musical style that continued to attract millions of fans decades later.

According to Rolling Stone's Holly George-Warren, "Black Sabbath was the heavy metal king of the 1970s." Although initially "despised by rock critics and ignored by radio programmers", the group sold more than 8 million albums by the end of that decade. "The heavy metal band..." marvelled Ronnie James Dio. "A band that didn't apologise for coming to town; it just stepped on buildings when it came to town."

In 2016, the staff of Loudwire named them the best metal band of all time.

=== Influence and innovation ===
Black Sabbath have influenced many acts including Judas Priest, Iron Maiden, Diamond Head, Slayer, Metallica, Korn, Black Flag, Mayhem, Venom, Guns N' Roses, Body Count, Alice in Chains, Anthrax, Disturbed, Death, Bathory, Opeth, Pantera, Megadeth, Sepultura, the Smashing Pumpkins, Slipknot, Foo Fighters, Testament, Fear Factory, Candlemass, Godsmack, Corrosion of Conformity, and Van Halen. Two Gold-selling tribute albums have been released, Nativity in Black Volume 1 & 2, including covers by Sepultura, White Zombie, Biohazard, Type O Negative, Faith No More, Machine Head, Primus, System of a Down, and Monster Magnet.

Metallica's Lars Ulrich, who, along with bandmate James Hetfield inducted Black Sabbath into the Rock and Roll Hall of Fame in 2006, said "Black Sabbath is and always will be synonymous with heavy metal", while Hetfield said "Sabbath got me started on all that evil-sounding shit, and it's stuck with me. Tony Iommi is the king of the heavy riff." Guns N' Roses guitarist Slash said of the Paranoid album: "There's just something about that whole record that, when you're a kid and you're turned onto it, it's like a whole different world. It just opens up your mind to another dimension...Paranoid is the whole Sabbath experience; very indicative of what Sabbath meant at the time. Tony's playing style—doesn't matter whether it's off Paranoid or if it's off Heaven and Hell—it's very distinctive." Anthrax guitarist Scott Ian said "I always get the question in every interview I do, 'What are your top five metal albums?' I make it easy for myself and always say the first five Sabbath albums."

Lamb of God's Chris Adler said: "If anybody who plays heavy metal says that they weren't influenced by Black Sabbath's music, then I think that they're lying to you. I think all heavy metal music was, in some way, influenced by what Black Sabbath did." Judas Priest vocalist Rob Halford commented: "They were and still are a groundbreaking band...you can put on the first Black Sabbath album and it still sounds as fresh today as it did 30-odd years ago. And that's because great music has a timeless ability: To me, Sabbath are in the same league as the Beatles or Mozart. They're on the leading edge of something extraordinary." On Black Sabbath's standing, Rage Against the Machine guitarist Tom Morello states: "The heaviest, scariest, coolest riffs and the apocalyptic Ozzy wail are without peer. You can hear the despair and menace of the working-class Birmingham streets they came from in every kick-ass, evil groove. Their arrival ground hippy, flower-power psychedelia to a pulp and set the standard for all heavy bands to come." Phil Anselmo of Pantera and Down stated that "Only a fool would leave out what Black Sabbath brought to the heavy metal genre".

According to Tracii Guns of L.A. Guns and former member of Guns N' Roses, the main riff of "Paradise City" by Guns N' Roses, from Appetite for Destruction (1987), was influenced by the song "Zero the Hero" from the Born Again album. King Diamond guitarist Andy LaRocque affirmed that the clean guitar part of "Sleepless Nights" from Conspiracy (1989) is inspired by Iommi's playing on Never Say Die!.

In addition to being pioneers of heavy metal, they also have been credited for laying the foundations for heavy metal subgenres black metal, doom metal, grunge, sludge metal, stoner rock and thrash metal. Sabbath has had a significant impact on alternative music, being cited as an influence by Nirvana, Soundgarden, and Dinosaur Jr.. Rock critic Simon Reynolds writes that when late 1980s bands such as Tad and the Butthole Surfers "revived Black Sabbath's ponderous riffs, it felt like a daring challenge to the approved canon of underground rock", and that "Sabbath-style heaviness" became the norm after the commercial emergence of grunge.

Iommi has been credited as the pioneer of lighter gauge guitar strings. The tips of his fingers were severed in a steel factory, and while using thimbles (artificial finger tips) he found that standard guitar strings were too difficult to bend and play. He found that there was only one size of strings available, so after years with Sabbath he had strings custom made.

Culturally, Black Sabbath have exerted a huge influence in both television and literature and have in many cases become synonymous with heavy metal. In the film Almost Famous, Lester Bangs gives the protagonist an assignment to cover the band with the immortal line: 'Give me 500 words on Black Sabbath'. Contemporary music and arts publication Trebuchet Magazine has put this to practice by asking all new writers to write a short piece (500 words) on Black Sabbath as a means of proving their creativity and voice on a well documented subject.

== Band members ==
Original and final line-up

- Tony Iommi – guitars (1968–2006, 2011–2017, 2025)
- Bill Ward – drums, vocals (1968–1980, 1983, 1984, 1985, 1992, 1994, 1997–2006, 2011–2012, 2025)
- Geezer Butler – bass (1968–1979, 1980–1984, 1985, 1987, 1990–1994, 1997–2006, 2011–2017, 2025)
- Ozzy Osbourne – vocals, harmonica (1968–1977, 1978–1979, 1985, 1997–2006, 2011–2017, 2025; died 2025)

== Discography ==
Studio albums

- Black Sabbath (1970)
- Paranoid (1970)
- Master of Reality (1971)
- Vol. 4 (1972)
- Sabbath Bloody Sabbath (1973)
- Sabotage (1975)
- Technical Ecstasy (1976)
- Never Say Die! (1978)
- Heaven and Hell (1980)
- Mob Rules (1981)
- Born Again (1983)
- Seventh Star (1986)
- The Eternal Idol (1987)
- Headless Cross (1989)
- Tyr (1990)
- Dehumanizer (1992)
- Cross Purposes (1994)
- Forbidden (1995)
- 13 (2013)

== Tours ==
- Polka Tulk Blues/Earth Tour 1968–1969
- Black Sabbath Tour 1970
- Paranoid Tour 1970–1971
- Master of Reality Tour 1971–1972
- Vol. 4 Tour 1972–1973
- Sabbath Bloody Sabbath Tour 1973–1974
- Sabotage Tour 1975–1976
- Technical Ecstasy Tour 1976–1977
- Never Say Die! Tour 1978
- Heaven & Hell Tour 1980–1981
- Mob Rules Tour 1981–1982
- Born Again Tour 1983
- Seventh Star Tour 1986
- Eternal Idol Tour 1987
- Headless Cross Tour 1989
- Tyr Tour 1990
- Dehumanizer Tour 1992
- Cross Purposes Tour 1994
- Forbidden Tour 1995
- Ozzfest Tour 1997
- European Tour 1998
- Reunion Tour 1998–1999
- Ozzfest Tour 1999
- US Tour 1999
- European Tour 1999
- Ozzfest Tour 2001
- Ozzfest Tour 2004
- European Tour 2005
- Ozzfest Tour 2005
- Black Sabbath Reunion Tour, 2012–2014
- The End Tour 2016–2017

== See also ==
- List of cover versions of Black Sabbath songs
- Heavy metal groups

== Sources ==
- Barnet, Richard D.; Burriss, Larry L. (2001). Controversies of the Music Industry. Foreword by Paul D. Fischer. Greenwood Publishing Group. ISBN 978-0-313-31094-2.
- Drewett, Michael (2006). Popular Music Censorship in Africa. Ashgate Publishing. ISBN 978-0-7546-5291-5.
- McIver, Joel (2006). Sabbath Bloody Sabbath. London: Omnibus Press. ISBN 978-1-84449-982-3.
- Iommi, Tony (2012). Iron Man: My Journey through Heaven and Hell with Black Sabbath. Da Capo Press. ISBN 978-0-306-82145-5.
- Koskoff, Ellen (2005). Music Cultures in the United States. New York: Routledge. ISBN 978-0-415-96589-7.
- Lewis, James R. (2001). Satanism Today: An Encyclopedia of Religion, Folklore, and Popular Culture. Santa Barbara: ABC-CLIO. ISBN 978-1-57607-292-9.
- Osbourne, Ozzy; Ayres, Chris (2010). I Am Ozzy. New York: Grand Central Publishing. ISBN 978-0-446-56989-7.
- Rosen, Steven (1996). The Story of Black Sabbath: Wheels of Confusion. Castle Communications. ISBN 978-1-86074-149-4.
- Sharpe-Young, Garry (2006). Sabbath Bloody Sabbath: The Battle for Black Sabbath. Zonda Books. ISBN 978-0-9582684-2-4.
- Strong, Martin Charles (2006). The Essential Rock Discography. Vol. 1 (8th ed.). New York: Canongate. ISBN 978-1-84195-827-9.
- Thompson, Dave (2004). Smoke on the Water: The Deep Purple Story. Toronto: ECW Press. ISBN 978-1-55022-618-8.
- Wilson, Dave (2004). Rock Formations: Categorical Answers to How Band Names Were Formed. San Jose, California: Cidermill Books. ISBN 978-0-9748483-5-8.
- Butler, Geezer (2023). Into the Void: From Birth to Black Sabbath—And Beyond. HarperCollins. ISBN 978-0-06-324252-4.
