= Mythos (disambiguation) =

Mythos is a worldview-based traditional story or body of mythology.

Mythos may also refer to:

== Media ==
=== Film and television ===
- Mythos, a character in the TV series Rounin
- Mythos (film), a multipart documentary on Joseph Campbell

=== Games and comics ===
- Mythos (card game), an Origins-Award-winning card game by Chaosium released in 1996
- Mythos Games, a defunct British video game developer company
- Mythos Island, a fictional place in the Disney comic series Mythos Island
- Mythos (Marvel Comics), a series of Marvel comic books
- Mythos (video game), a 2011 computer game by HanbitSoft Inc. & T3 Entertainment
  - Mythos, the unreleased North American version of the 2011 game, in development by Redbana Corporation
- MythOS, a fictional corporation that runs the simulation system in Bonelab.

=== Literature ===
- Mythos (Aristotle), the term used by Aristotle in his Poetics for the plot of an Athenian tragedy
- Mythos (book), a retelling of a number of Ancient Greek myths by Stephen Fry
- Mythos (journal), a journal published by the University of Palermo since the 1990s
- Mythos-Magazin, a magazine published by the University of Düsseldorf since 2005
- MythOS, a science-fiction novel by Kelly McCullough

=== Music ===
- Mythos (band), a German krautrock band (founded 1969)
  - Mythos (Mythos album) (1972)
- Mythos (musical project), a Canadian music project (founded 1996), or their self-titled album
- Remastered Tracks Rockman Zero: Mythos, a soundtrack of the Mega Man Zero series
- Mythos (Mario Pavone album) (2002)
- Mythos (Soul Embraced album), a 2013 album by the Christian metal band Soul Embraced

== Food and drink ==
- Mythos Beer, a Greek beer produced by the Olympic Brewery
- Mythos (restaurant), at the Universal Orlando Resort

== Technology ==
- Claude Mythos, a large language model developed by Anthropic
- Kohl Mythos, a German observation ultralight aircraft
- Ferrari Mythos, a concept car

== See also ==
- Myth (disambiguation)
- Mythology (disambiguation)
- Mythus (disambiguation)
- Mythic
- Methos
- Mythopoeia
- Mỹ Tho
