= Mythology (disambiguation) =

Mythology is a collection of myths, or the study of them.

Mythology or Mythologies may also refer to:

== Books ==
- Mythology (book), a 1942 book by Edith Hamilton
- Mythologies (book), a 1957 book by Roland Barthes
- Mythology: Greek Gods, Heroes, & Monsters, a 2007 book by Dugald Steer

== Music ==
- Mythology (band), an English band of the 1960s featuring Tony Iommi and Bill Ward, later founding members of Black Sabbath
- Mythology (Bee Gees album) (2010)
- Mythology (Derek Sherinian album) (2004)
- Mythology (Eloy Fritsch album) (2001)
- Mythologies (Rhett Miller album), 1989
- Mythologies (Danaë Xanthe Vlasse album), 2021
- Mythologies (ballet), a 2022 ballet created by the French choreographer Angelin Preljocaj and composer Thomas Bangalter

== Other uses ==
- Mythology (agency), American advertising agency and design studio
- Mythology (fiction) or canon, the official notion of the overarching plot of a media franchise
- Mythology (board game), a 1980 game from Yaquinto

== See also ==
- Myth (disambiguation)
- Mythos (disambiguation)
- Mythopoeia
