= Dreamlab =

Dreamlab may refer to:

- Dreamlab (album), album by the German band Mythos
- Dreamlab (production team), Australian production team consisting of Daniel James and Leah Haywood
- DreamLab, a volunteer computing mobile Android and IOS app
