= Mythic =

Mythic may refer to:

- Myth, a folklore genre
- Mythic Britain & Ireland, is a 2022 role-playing game supplement
- Mythic Entertainment, an American video game developer
- Mythic fiction is literature that draws from the tropes, themes, and symbolism of myth, legend, folklore, and fairy tales
- Mythic Galveston: Reinventing America's Third Coast is a 2002 non-fiction book by Susan Hardwick
- Mythic Gardens (for cello and orchestra) is a cello concerto
- Mythic humanoids are legendary, folkloric, or mythological creatures that are part human, or that resemble humans.
- Mythic Journeys is a performance festival and conference gathering held in Atlanta, Georgia, United States.
- Mythic Places, is a 1991 role-playing supplement for Ars Magica
- Mythic Quest, an American comedy television series
- Mythic Sound, is an American record label.
- Mythic Warriors, is a 1998–2000 anthology animated television series
- The Mythic Circle, is an illustrated fiction magazine

== See also ==
- Myth (disambiguation)
- Mythicism (disambiguation)
- Mythos (disambiguation)
