= The 1996 DEP Sessions =

Studio album by Tony Iommi feat. Glenn Hughes
- Released: 28 September 2004 (US); 4 October 2004 (UK)
- Recorded: 1996 (drums rerecorded in 2004)
- Genre: Heavy metal; hard rock
- Length: 37:46
- Label: Sanctuary (US), Mayan (UK)
- Producer: Tony Iommi

Tony Iommi feat. Glenn Hughes chronology
Seventh Star (1986)	The 1996 DEP Sessions (2004)	Fused (2005)

Tony Iommi chronology
Iommi (2000)	The 1996 DEP Sessions (2004)	Fused (2005)

Professional ratings
Review scores
Source	Rating
AllMusic	3.5/5 stars

The 1996 DEP Sessions is a collaborative studio album by English musicians Tony Iommi and Glenn Hughes, released through Sanctuary and Mayan Records in 2004.

Material for The 1996 DEP Sessions was originally recorded in 1996, and was circulated among fans as a bootleg recording dubbed Eighth Star, in reference to the 1986 Iommi-Hughes collaboration Seventh Star. On this recording, two of the final tracks were missing, while a cover of Jethro Tull's "To Cry You A Song" (mistitled "Shaking My Wings") was included, though it does not feature Tony Iommi. The album title reflects the fact that the tracks were recorded in the DEP International Studios in Digbeth, Birmingham.

The album's drum tracks were originally performed by Dave Holland, formerly of Judas Priest and one-time bandmate of Glenn Hughes in Trapeze. After Holland was convicted of attempted rape in 2003, Iommi had the drum tracks re-recorded by Jimmy Copley prior to release to prevent the album from having any association with a sex offender.

== Track listing ==
No.	Title	Length
1.	"Gone"	4:29
2.	"From Another World"	5:55
3.	"Don't You Tell Me"	4:14
4.	"Don't Drag the River"	4:34
5.	"Fine"	5:05
6.	"Time Is the Healer"	4:16
7.	"I'm Not the Same Man"	4:20
8.	"It Falls Through Me"	4:46
Total length:		37:46

== Personnel ==
- Tony Iommi – guitars
- Glenn Hughes – vocals, bass
- Don Airey – keyboards
- Jimmy Copley – drums
- Neil Murray – additional bass
- Geoff Nicholls – additional keyboards
- Mike Exeter – additional keyboards, engineering, mixing
