= Fused (album) =

Studio album by Tony Iommi and Glenn Hughes
- Released: 11 July 2005 (UK)
- Recorded: 2004
- Genre: Heavy metal
- Length: 49:27
- Label: Sanctuary
- Producers: Bob Marlette and Tony Iommi

Tony Iommi and Glenn Hughes chronology
The 1996 DEP Sessions (2004)	Fused (2005)	From the Dark (2026)

Professional ratings
Review scores
Source	Rating
AllMusic	4/5 stars

Fused is the third solo album by Black Sabbath guitarist Tony Iommi, released in 2005. The album also features vocalist/bassist Glenn Hughes (who briefly “fronted” Black Sabbath in the mid-1980s, assuming vocal duties on the album Seventh Star – an album that was originally intended to be Iommi's first solo album) and drummer Kenny Aronoff.

The album was recorded in Monnow Valley Studios, Wales in December 2004 and BHM's studio in Warwickshire, England, and was produced, engineered and mixed by Bob Marlette (who also contributed keyboards and bass on the album), with additional production by Tony Iommi. Fused reached number 34 on Billboard's Top Heatseekers chart.

A two-LP edition on vinyl was released in 2024.

== Track listing ==
All tracks are written by Bob Marlette, Glenn Hughes and Tony Iommi.

No.	Title	Length
1.	"Dopamine"	4:10
2.	"Wasted Again"	3:56
3.	"Saviour of the Real"	4:07
4.	"Resolution Song"	4:56
5.	"Grace"	5:13
6.	"Deep Inside a Shell"	3:42
7.	"What You're Living For"	4:37
8.	"Face Your Fear"	4:36
9.	"The Spell"	4:57
10.	"I Go Insane"	9:13

Bonus tracks
No.	Title	Length
11.	"Let It Down Easy" (Japan bonus track)	4:34
12.	"The Innocence" (iTunes bonus track)	4:40
13.	"Slip Away" (Real.com bonus track)	5:23

== Personnel ==
per liner notes

- Tony Iommi – lead and rhythm guitars, additional production
- Glenn Hughes – vocals, bass
- Kenny Aronoff – drums
- Bob Marlette – keyboards, bass, production, engineering, mixing
- Mike Exeter – additional engineering, programming
- Hugh Gilmour – artwork, design
- Ralph Baker – executive producer
- Jeff Greenberg – legal at Beldock, Levine & Hoffman, NYC
- JMO Design – logo
- Dick Beetham – mastering
- Sid Riggs – programming
- Mike Clement – equipment technician

== Charts ==
Year	Chart	Position
2005	US Billboard (Top Heatseekers)	34
2005	German Album Charts	92
