= The Myth =

The Myth may refer to:

- The Myth (film), a 2005 Hong Kong film
  - The Myth (TV series), a 2010 Chinese TV series based on the 2005 film
- Nickname of Cuban bodybuilder Sergio Oliva
- The Myth (band), a Maltese rock band
- The Myth (short film), a 1967 short fiction film directed by Adoor Gopalakrishnan
- "The Myth", a theme song for the 1995 film Gamera: Guardian of the Universe by Japanese rock band Bakufu Slump

== See also ==
- Myth (disambiguation)
