= Tony Iommi =

British rock guitarist (born 1948)

Tony Iommi MBE
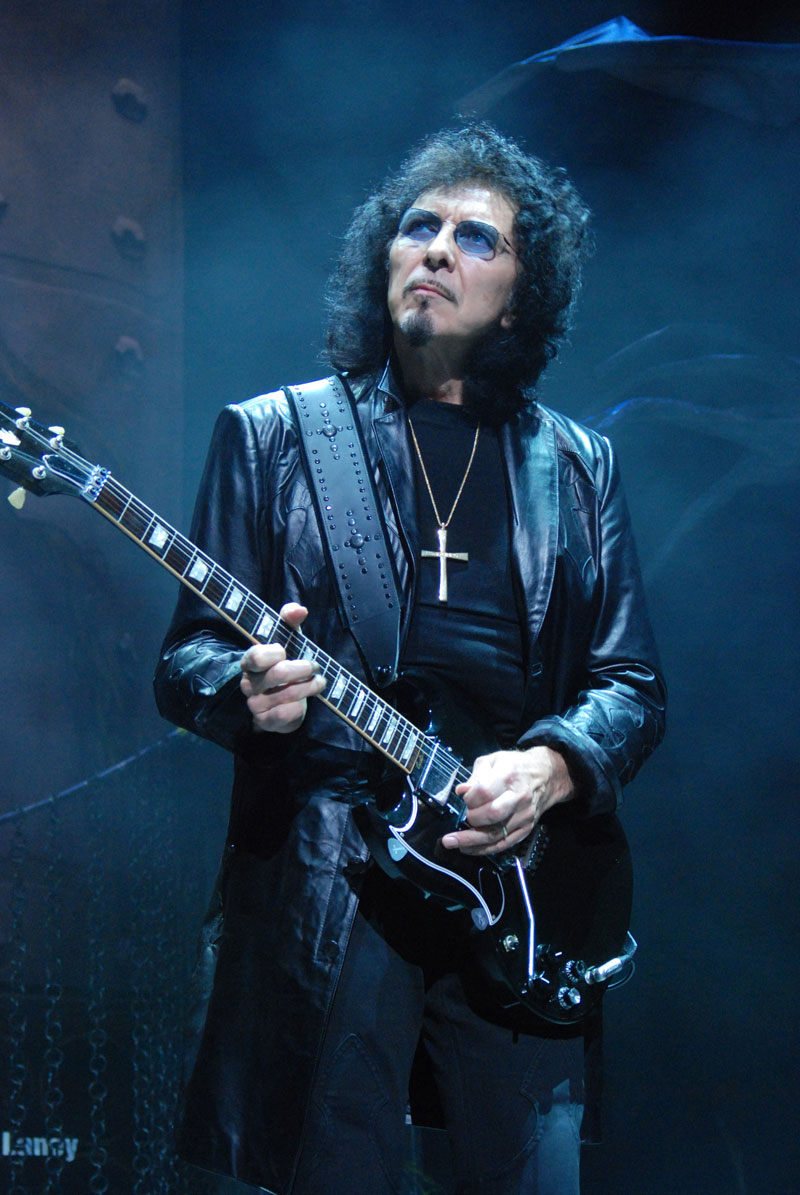
- Iommi performing with Heaven & Hell in 2009
- Born: Anthony Frank Iommi Jr. 19 February 1948 (age 78); Handsworth, Birmingham, England
- Citizenship: United Kingdom; Italy
- Occupations: Musician; songwriter
- Spouses: Susan Snowden (m. 1973; div. 1976); Melinda Diaz (m. 1980; div. 1985); Valery Iommi (m. 1987; div. 1993); Maria Sjöholm (m. 2005)
- Children: 1
- Musical career
- Genre: Heavy metal
- Instruments: Guitar
- Years active: 1964–present
- Labels: Warner Bros.; I.R.S.; Rhino; BMG
- Formerly of: Black Sabbath; Jethro Tull; Mythology; Velvett Fogg; WhoCares; Heaven & Hell
- Website: iommi.com

Anthony Frank Iommi Jr. MBE (/ˌaɪˈoʊmiː/; born 19 February 1948) is an English musician. He co-founded the pioneering heavy metal band Black Sabbath in 1968, and was the guitarist, leader, main composer, and only constant member during the band's existence for over fifty years, playing guitar on all of their releases. He has been referred to as the "Godfather of Heavy Metal".

As a teen, Iommi lost the tips of his right-hand ring and middle fingers in a work accident at a sheet metal factory, which influenced his distinct playing style. He down-tuned his guitar and used more power chords (partly to make playing easier), and made much use of the tritone (or 'devil's interval'), resulting in a 'heavier' and 'darker' sound that became a hallmark of heavy metal. As well as Black Sabbath, he was briefly live guitarist for Jethro Tull in 1968. Iommi intended Seventh Star (1986) to be his first solo album, but the record label decided to release it under the Black Sabbath name. In 2000, he released his first official solo album Iommi, followed in 2005 by Fused, which featured former bandmate Glenn Hughes. In 2006 Iommi formed Heaven & Hell with former Black Sabbath bandmates. They released The Devil You Know (2009), before disbanding after the death of singer Ronnie James Dio in 2010.

Iommi is widely regarded as one of the greatest and most influential rock guitarists ever. He has won many awards, including three Grammy Awards and a Lifetime Achievement Award from the National Guitar Museum, and is honoured on the Birmingham Walk of Stars. In 2011, Iommi published his autobiography, entitled Iron Man: My Journey Through Heaven and Hell with Black Sabbath.

== Early life ==
Iommi was born at Heathfield Road Maternity Hospital in Birmingham; he is the only child of Italian immigrants Sylvia Maria (née Valenti) from Palermo, Sicily, and Anthony Frank Iommi Sr. from Marche. Sylvia's family were vineyard owners in Italy. The family was Catholic, though they rarely attended Mass. Their family home in the Park Lane area of Aston also housed a shop which was a popular meeting place in the neighbourhood, with the living room doubling as the shop's stockroom. His mother ran the shop while his father was a carpenter by trade.

Born and raised in Handsworth, Birmingham, Iommi attended Birchfield Road School, where future bandmate Ozzy Osbourne was also a pupil one year behind him. At age eight or nine, while being chased by another boy, Iommi fell and cut his upper lip. As a result, he gained the nickname "Scarface", which made him self-conscious, so he eventually grew his trademark moustache as a means of covering the scar.

At about age 10, Iommi began working out and learned judo, karate, and later boxing as a means of protecting himself from the local gangs that congregated in his neighbourhood. He envisioned a future as a bouncer in a nightclub. Iommi initially wanted to play the drums, but due to a lack of space and the excessive noise he chose the guitar instead as a teenager, after being inspired by the likes of Hank Marvin and the Shadows. After completing school, Iommi worked briefly as a plumber and later in a factory manufacturing rings. He stated that at one point he worked in a music store, but quit after being falsely accused of stealing.

At the age of 17, Iommi lost the tips of the middle and ring fingers of his right hand (his fretting hand, since he is left-handed) in an industrial accident on his last day of work in a sheet metal factory. Iommi described how he "was told 'you'll never play again'. It was just unbelievable. I sat in the hospital with my hand in this bag and I thought, that's it – I'm finished. But eventually I thought 'I'm not going to accept that. There must be a way I can play'." After the injury, Iommi's factory foreman played him a recording of famous jazz guitarist Django Reinhardt, which encouraged him to continue as a musician. As Iommi later wrote:

My friend said, "Listen to this guy play", and I went, "No way! Listening to someone play the guitar is the very last thing I want to do right now!" But he kept insisting and he ended up playing the record for me. I told him I thought it was really good and then he said, "You know, the guy's only playing with two fingers on his fretboard hand because of an injury he sustained in a terrible fire." I was totally knocked back by this revelation and was so impressed by what I had just heard that I suddenly became inspired to start trying to play again.

Inspired by Reinhardt's two-fingered guitar playing, Iommi decided to try playing guitar again, though the injury made it quite painful to do so. Although it was an option, Iommi never seriously considered switching hands and learning to play right-handed. In an interview with Guitar World magazine, he was asked if he was "ever tempted to switch to right-handed playing". Iommi responded:

If I knew what I know now I probably would have switched. At the time I had already been playing two or three years, and it seemed like I had been playing a long time. I thought I'd never be able to change the way I played. The reality of the situation was that I hadn't been playing very long at all, and I probably could have spent the same amount of time learning to play right handed. I did have a go at it, but I just didn't have the patience. It seemed impossible to me. I decided to make do with what I had, and I made some plastic fingertips for myself. I just persevered with it.

To play left-handed, he fitted homemade thimbles to his injured fingers to extend and protect them; the thimbles were made from an old Fairy Liquid bottle – "melted it down, got a hot soldering iron and shaped it like a finger" – and cut sections from a leather jacket to cover his new homemade prosthetic, which created two technical problems. First, the thimbles prevented him from feeling the strings, causing a tendency to press down very hard on them. Second, he had difficulty bending strings, leading him to seek light-gauge guitar strings to make it easier to do so. However, Iommi recalls that such strings were not manufactured at the time, so he used banjo strings instead, until around 1970–71 when Picato Strings began making light-gauge guitar strings. Furthermore, he used the injured fingers predominantly for fretting chords rather than single-note solos. In 1974, Iommi told Guitar Player magazine that the thimbles "helped with his technique" because he had to use his little finger more than he had before the accident. Later, he also began tuning his guitar to lower pitches, sometimes as far as three semitones below standard guitar tuning (e.g., on "Children of the Grave", "Lord of this World", and "Into the Void", all on the album Master of Reality). Although Iommi states that the main purpose of doing so was to create a "bigger, heavier sound", slackening the strings makes it easier to bend them.

== Career ==
=== Early career ===
Iommi had played in several blues/rock bands, one of the earliest of which was the Rockin' Chevrolets from 1964 to 1965. The band had regular bookings. Iommi later joined The Birds And Bees, and when they were offered work in Germany, Iommi decided to leave his factory job to take up the opportunity. From 1966 to 1967, Iommi played in a band named the Rest. It was in the Rest that Iommi first met future-Black Sabbath drummer Bill Ward, who played drums and sang in the band.

==== Mythology ====
From January until July 1968, Iommi was guitarist in Mythology, with Ward joining a month later in mid-February. In May 1968 police raided the group's practice flat and found cannabis resin, which resulted in fines for the band members. Most significantly, the incident made it quite difficult for the band to secure future bookings as most club owners avoided bands they viewed as drug users. Mythology subsequently split up after a gig in Silloth on 13 July 1968.

==== Rare Breed/Earth ====
In August 1968, at the same time as the break-up of Mythology, another Birmingham band called Rare Breed also broke up. Vocalist Ozzy Osbourne joined with Iommi and Ward after the duo responded to an advert in a local music shop proclaiming "Ozzy Zig Requires Gig – has own PA". Requiring a bassist, Osbourne mentioned his former Rare Breed bandmate Geezer Butler, who was subsequently hired along with slide guitarist Jimmy Phillips and saxophonist Alan "Aker" Clarke. The six-piece band were named the Polka Tulk Blues Band. After just two gigs (the last of which was at the Banklands Youth Club in Workington), Phillips and Clarke were dismissed from the band, which soon after shortened its name to Polka Tulk.

==== Jethro Tull ====
Iommi, Butler, Ward, and Osbourne renamed the band Earth in September 1968. The same month Iommi briefly departed to join Jethro Tull, but only gave two performances with them (an appearance on The Rolling Stones Rock and Roll Circus in which the band mimed "A Song for Jeffrey" while Ian Anderson sang live, and a live appearance at the BBC). Iommi rejoined Earth in November 1968.

Concerning his brief working relationship with Jethro Tull vocalist Ian Anderson, Iommi said:

I learned quite a lot from him, I must say. I learned that you have got to work at it. You have to rehearse. When I came back and I got the band (Earth) back together, I made sure that everybody was up early in the morning and rehearsing. I used to go and pick them up. I was the only one at the time that could drive. I used to have to drive the bloody van and get them up at quarter to nine every morning; which was, believe me, early for us then. I said to them, "This is how we have got to do it because this is how Jethro Tull did it." They had a schedule and they knew that they were going to work from this time till that time. I tried that with our band and we got into doing it. It worked. Instead of just strolling in at any hour, it made it more like we were saying, "Let's do it!"

=== Black Sabbath ===
In August 1969, after being confused with another group named Earth (who had minor success in England), the group renamed themselves Black Sabbath after a horror film. Black Sabbath formed from the ashes of Mythology, which featured guitarist Tony Iommi and drummer Bill Ward. The two would recruit bassist Geezer Butler and vocalist Ozzy Osbourne as part of their new band, initially named Earth and later renamed to Black Sabbath, after the 1963 Italian horror film. After their live debut in Workington, England, the band would sign with Philips Records, and would receive distribution from the label's newly formed subsidiary, Vertigo Records.

==== Black Sabbath (1970) and Paranoid (1971) ====
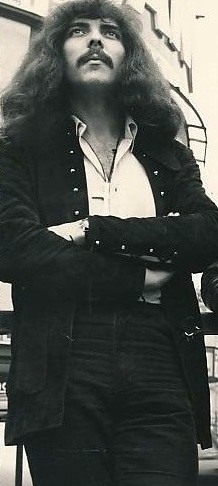
Iommi in 1970

The band recorded the song "Evil Woman" and its B-side '"Wicked World" on 10 November 1969 at Trident Studios on St. Anne's Court, London, and recorded the remainder of the album at Regent Sounds Studio on Denmark Street, in a 12-hour session on 17 November. Iommi said: "We just went in the studio and did it in a day, we played our live set and that was it. We actually thought a whole day was quite a long time, then off we went the next day to play for £20 in Switzerland." Aside from the bells, thunder and rain sound effects added to the beginning of the opening track and the double-tracked guitar solos on "N.I.B." and "Sleeping Village", there were virtually no overdubs added to the album. Iommi recalls recording live: "We thought, 'We have two days to do it and one of the days is mixing.' So we played live. Ozzy was singing at the same time, we just put him in a separate booth and off we went. We never had a second run of most of the stuff."

Iommi began recording the album with a white Fender Stratocaster, his guitar of choice at the time, until a malfunctioning pickup forced him to finish recording with a Gibson SG, a guitar he had recently purchased as a backup but had "never really played". The SG was a right-handed model, which the left-handed Iommi played upside down. Soon after recording the album, he met a right-handed guitarist who was playing a left-handed SG upside down, and the two agreed to swap guitars; this SG became Iommi's main guitar that he modified and later "put out to pasture" at the Hard Rock Cafe. In his autobiography Iron Man: My Journey Through Heaven & Hell with Black Sabbath, Iommi played down the producer's role, insisting, "We didn't choose to work with Rodger Bain, he was chosen for us... He was good to have around, but we didn't really get a lot of advice from him. He maybe suggested a couple of things, but the songs were already fairly structured and sorted."

Released on Friday the 13th February 1970, Black Sabbath reached number eight on the UK Albums Charts. Following its United States release in June 1970 by Warner Bros. Records, the album reached number 23 on the Billboard Top LPs chart, where it remained for more than a year and sold one million copies.

In an effort to capitalize on the recent UK chart success of their debut, Black Sabbath returned to the studio with producer Rodger Bain in June 1970, just four months after the album was released. Paranoid was recorded at Regent Sound Studios and Island Studios in London, England over 16–18 June. Most of the songs on Paranoid evolved during onstage improvisational jams. In the Classic Albums documentary on the making of Paranoid, guitarist Tony Iommi recalls that "War Pigs" came from "one of the clubs" with Butler adding, "During the song "Warning" we used to jam that out and that particular night when we were jamming it out Tony just went da-dum!" In the same documentary, Iommi demonstrates his approach to the guitar solo in the song, explaining that "I always tried to keep the bottom string ringing so it fills it out nicely." Most of the album's songs were originally created in the fall of 1969 in a music club in Zurich, Switzerland. Black Sabbath spent six weeks in Zurich starting around mid-November 1969. They played at what was then known as the 'Beat Club' (also called the Hirschen Club) on the ground floor of the Hotel Hirschen in Zurich's old town. The engagement included seven 45-minute sets per day for six weeks. Black Sabbath didn't have much material back then, so they played only one song per set, but for 45 minutes. They had thus used the 'Beat Club' also "for rehearsals" (Ozzy Osbourne).

The album was issued in the United Kingdom in September 1970, where its sales were enhanced by the success of the "Paranoid" single. "That single attracted screaming kids", Iommi recalled in the liner notes to Reunion in 1998. "We saw people dancing when we played it and we decided that we shouldn't do singles for a long while after that to stay true to the fans who'd liked us before we'd become popular." Paranoid's US release was delayed until January 1971, as the Black Sabbath album was still on the charts at the time of its UK release. Paranoid reached No. 12 in the US in March 1971 with virtually no radio airplay.

Paranoid's chart success allowed the band to tour the US for the first time in October 1970, which spawned the release of the album's second single "Iron Man". Although it failed to reach the top 40, "Iron Man" remains one of Black Sabbath's most popular songs, as well as the band's highest charting US single.

==== Master of Reality (1971) and Vol. 4 (1972) ====
In February 1971, Black Sabbath returned to the studio to begin work on their third album Master of Reality at Island Studios in London. On the tracks "Children of the Grave", "Lord of This World", and "Into the Void", Iommi downtuned his guitar 1 1/2 steps in an effort to reduce string tension, thus making the guitar less painful for him to play. This pain was the result of a factory accident years earlier in which he had the tips of two of his fingers severed. The downtuning also helped the guitarist produce what he called a "bigger, heavier sound". Geezer Butler also downtuned his bass guitar to match Iommi. Iommi was among the first bands to utilize lower tunings, and the technique became a mainstay of heavy metal music. Iommi combined blues-like guitar solos and dark, minor-key riffing with a revolutionary high-gain, heavily distorted tone with his use of power chords, a modified treble-boosting effect-pedal and a Gibson SG. For "Solitude", Iommi played guitar, flute, and piano.

During the album's recording sessions, Osbourne brought Iommi a large joint which caused Iommi to cough uncontrollably. Iommi was recording acoustic guitar parts at the time, and his coughing fit was captured on tape. A fragment of Iommi's coughing was later added by producer Bain as the intro to "Sweet Leaf". Iommi recalled "We all played 'Sweet Leaf' while stoned." Iommi believes the band might have become too comfortable, however, telling Guitar World in 1992, "During Master of Reality, we started getting more experimental and began taking too much time to record. Ultimately, I think it really confused us. Sometimes I think I'd really like to go back to the way we recorded the first two albums. I've always preferred just going into the studio and playing, without spending a lot of time rehearsing or getting sounds." The song "Into the Void" was especially problematic, with Iommi saying in the same interview: "We tried recording 'Into the Void' in a couple of different studios because Bill just couldn't get it right. Whenever that happened, he would start believing that he wasn't capable of playing the song. He'd say: 'To hell with it – I'm not doing this!' There was one track like that on every album, and 'Into the Void' was the most difficult one on Master of Reality."

Though the production of Vol. 4 is officially credited to Black Sabbath and Patrick Meehan, the bulk of the actual production was performed by Iommi. According to Iommi, Meehan had little actual involvement in the album's production but nonetheless insisted he be listed as producer. The recording was plagued with problems, many due to substance abuse. In the studio, the band regularly had speaker boxes full of cocaine delivered. In his autobiography I Am Ozzy, Osbourne speaks at length about the sessions: "In spite of all the arsing around, musically those few weeks in Bel Air were the strongest we'd ever been." But he admits, "Eventually we started to wonder where the fuck all the coke was coming from... that coke was the whitest, purest, strongest stuff you could ever imagine. One sniff, and you were king of the universe." During a show in support of Vol. 4 at the Hollywood Bowl, the cocaine abuse caught up to Iommi. "Tony had been doing coke literally for days. We all had, but Tony had gone over the edge. He walked off the stage and collapsed," said Osbourne. During soundcheck earlier that same day, a crazed Christian man attempted to storm the stage and stab Iommi with a dagger, but he was tackled by members of the band's crew. According to Butler, "we wanted to take a break" at that point.

"FX" came about unexpectedly in the studio. After smoking hashish, the crucifix hanging from Iommi's neck accidentally struck the strings of his guitar and the band took an interest in the odd sound produced. An echo effect was added and the band proceeded to hit the guitar with various objects to generate odd sound effects. Iommi calls the song "a total joke".

Although most of the album is in the band's trademark heavy style, some songs demonstrate a more sensitive approach. "Changes", for example, written by Iommi with lyrics by Butler, is a piano ballad with Mellotron. Iommi taught himself to play the piano after finding one in the ballroom of the Bel-Air mansion they were renting. It was on this piano that "Changes" was composed. "Tony just sat down at the piano and came up with this beautiful riff," Osbourne writes in his memoir. "I hummed a melody over the top, and Geezer wrote these heartbreaking lyrics about the break-up Bill was going through with his wife. I thought that was brilliant from the moment we recorded it."

==== Sabbath Bloody Sabbath (1974) and Sabotage (1975) ====
Following Black Sabbath's 1972–1973 world tour in support of Vol. 4, the band sought to recreate the recording atmosphere, and returned to the Record Plant Studios. The band rented a house in Bel Air and began writing in the summer of 1973, but due in part to substance abuse and fatigue, were unable to complete any songs. "Ideas weren't coming out the way they were on Vol. 4 and we really got discontent" said Tony Iommi. "Everybody was sitting there waiting for me to come up with something. I just couldn't think of anything. And if I didn't come up with anything, nobody would do anything." Iommi admitted to Phil Alexander in 2013, "I panicked because I didn't have a single idea about what to write. It might have been the drugs, it could have been the pressure, but either way I felt it was my fault. "Iommi began to resent doing most of the songwriting and studio work, thus having no social life. In 2013, bassist Geezer Butler told Mojo magazine that after the tour in support of Vol. 4 the band was "absolutely, completely exhausted" and by the time they played the Hollywood Bowl, "Tony collapsed. It was really touch-and-go at one point whether he'd survive or not because he was totally depleted. So we had to cancel the rest of the tour and we actually took time off for the first time since the band started. We got away from each other and had a social life. Then we came back together to start on the next album, and couldn't come up with anything." In his autobiography I Am Ozzy, Ozzy Osbourne states that in the time leading up to the Hollywood Bowl "Tony had been doing coke literally for days – we all had, but Tony had gone over the edge. I mean, that stuff just twists your whole idea of reality. You start seeing things that aren't there. And Tony was gone. Near the end of the gig he walked off stage and collapsed."

After a month in Los Angeles with no results, the band opted to return to the UK, where they rented Clearwell Castle in the Forest of Dean, Gloucestershire, England, in which the likes of Led Zeppelin, Mott the Hoople and Deep Purple wrote and recorded. The medieval surroundings may have revitalised the band musically, but also left a sinister impression; in the liner notes to the 1998 live album Reunion, Iommi recalls, "We rehearsed in the armoury there and one night I was walking down the corridor with Ozzy and we saw this figure in a black cloak... we followed this figure back into the armoury and there was absolutely no one there. Whoever it was had disappeared into thin air! The people that owned the castle knew all about this ghost and they said, 'Oh yes, that's the ghost of so and so. We were like 'what!?'" Adds Butler, "we rehearsed in the dungeons and it was really creepy but it had some atmosphere, it conjured up things, and stuff started coming out again". While working in the dungeon, Iommi stumbled onto the main riff of "Sabbath Bloody Sabbath", which set the tone for the new material. In 2001 Butler admitted to Dan Epstein of Guitar World: "We almost thought that we were finished as a band... once Tony came out with the initial riff for 'Sabbath Bloody Sabbath' we went 'We're baaaack!'" The spooky atmosphere at Clearwell Castle perfectly complemented the band's practice of playing practical jokes on one another. In the documentary Black Sabbath, Volume 1: 1970–1978 Iommi recalled: "I've got to be honest, we frightened the life out of each other. We had to leave in the end, everybody terrified of each other because we were playing jokes on each other and nobody knew who was doing it... we used to leave and drive all the way home and drive back the next day.

Although the band's then-manager Patrick Meehan received credit as co-producer, Iommi said years later that Meehan had virtually no actual involvement in the album's production, saying "Meehan's ego got involved, and he stuck his name down as producer". Recording was completed at Morgan Studios in Willesden, North London in 1973. Building on the stylistic changes introduced on Vol. 4, new songs incorporated synthesizers, strings, keyboards and more complex arrangements. Iommi experimented with sitar and bagpipes in the studio but was not able to master the instruments to his satisfaction. In his autobiography Iron Man: My Journey Through Heaven & Hell with Black Sabbath, Iommi reveals that the initial riff for "A National Acrobat" was written by Butler, to which the guitarist "added bits to it. Geezer can write some great stuff." The instrumental "Fluff" was composed by Iommi and named after BBC radio disc jockey Alan "Fluff" Freeman. Freeman was one of the few radio personalities in Britain to play Sabbath's music on-air.

Black Sabbath began work on their sixth album in February 1975, again in England, at Morgan Studios in Willesden, London. The title Sabotage was chosen because the band was at the time being sued by their former management and felt they were being "sabotaged all the way along the line and getting punched from all sides", according to Iommi. "It was probably the only album ever made with lawyers in the studio," said drummer Bill Ward. Iommi credits those legal troubles for the album's angry, heavier sound. On the recording process, Iommi explained, "We could've continued and gone on and on, getting more technical, using orchestras and everything else, which we didn't particularly want to. We took a look at ourselves, and we wanted to do a rock album – Sabbath Bloody Sabbath wasn't a rock album, really." According to the book How Black Was Our Sabbath, "The recording sessions would usually carry on into the middle of the night. Tony Iommi was working really hard on the production side of things with the band's co-producer Mike Butcher, and he was spending a lot of time working out his guitar sounds. Bill, too, was experimenting with the drums, especially favouring the 'backwards cymbal' effect." Osbourne, however, grew frustrated with how long Black Sabbath albums were taking to record, writing in his autobiography, "Sabotage took about four thousand years."

The brief instrumental "Don't Start (Too Late)" is an acoustic guitar showpiece for Iommi, titled for tape operator David Harris, who often despaired at Sabbath being prone to start playing before he was ready to start recording. Iommi describes "Symptom of the Universe's" dynamics in his autobiography Iron Man: "It starts with an acoustic bit. Then it goes into the up-tempo stuff to give it that dynamic, and it does have a lot of changes to it, including the jam at the end". The final part evolved from an in-studio improvisation, created very spontaneously in a single day, and the decision was made to use it in that song. The English Chamber Choir was brought in to perform the song "Supertzar".

According to Iommi, the Sabotage sessions were the scene of a legendary jam session between Black Sabbath and Led Zeppelin. Iommi's recollection may be inaccurate, however, as records show that Zeppelin were on tour in the US at the time Sabotage was being recorded. Ward's recollection of the exact timing of the Zeppelin jam session is also fuzzy. "I don't even know what album we were working on", the drummer explained. "But one of John (Bonham)'s favourite songs was 'Supernaut' – so, when they came down to the studio, he wanted to jam 'Supernaut'." It is more likely that the jam session took place during the recording of the previous album, Sabbath Bloody Sabbath.

==== Technical Ecstasy (1976), Never Say Die! (1978), and firing Ozzy Osbourne ====
By the late 1970s, Black Sabbath were experiencing problematic substance use, managerial problems, and touring exhaustion. In addition, Iommi's slow, blues-driven riffs were seen by some as outmoded against the rising generation of metal bands such as Judas Priest and Motörhead. After frustrating legal battles that accompanied the recording of 1975's Sabotage, Sabbath chose Miami's Criteria Studios for the making of Technical Ecstasy, which continued the band's separation from the doom and darkness that had been a trademark of their earlier albums. "Some people may have heard the band in 1970", noted Iommi, "and be thinking, 'Oh no, not them again!' But if they heard us now, they probably might like us."

Ozzy Osbourne briefly left following the Technical Ecstasy Tour. Although he would eventually return for the follow-up Never Say Die!, the band temporarily replaced him with vocalist Dave Walker. The band wrote a handful of songs with Walker and performed an early version of what would become "Junior's Eyes" on the BBC program Look Hear. According to Iommi, although he and Osbourne likely wanted to reunite, no one communicated directly. Osbourne eventually returned, but refused to sing any of the material written during Walker’s tenure. Because the band was often writing songs during the day and recording them at night, they had little time for revisions, resulting in an album Iommi later described as lacking cohesion.

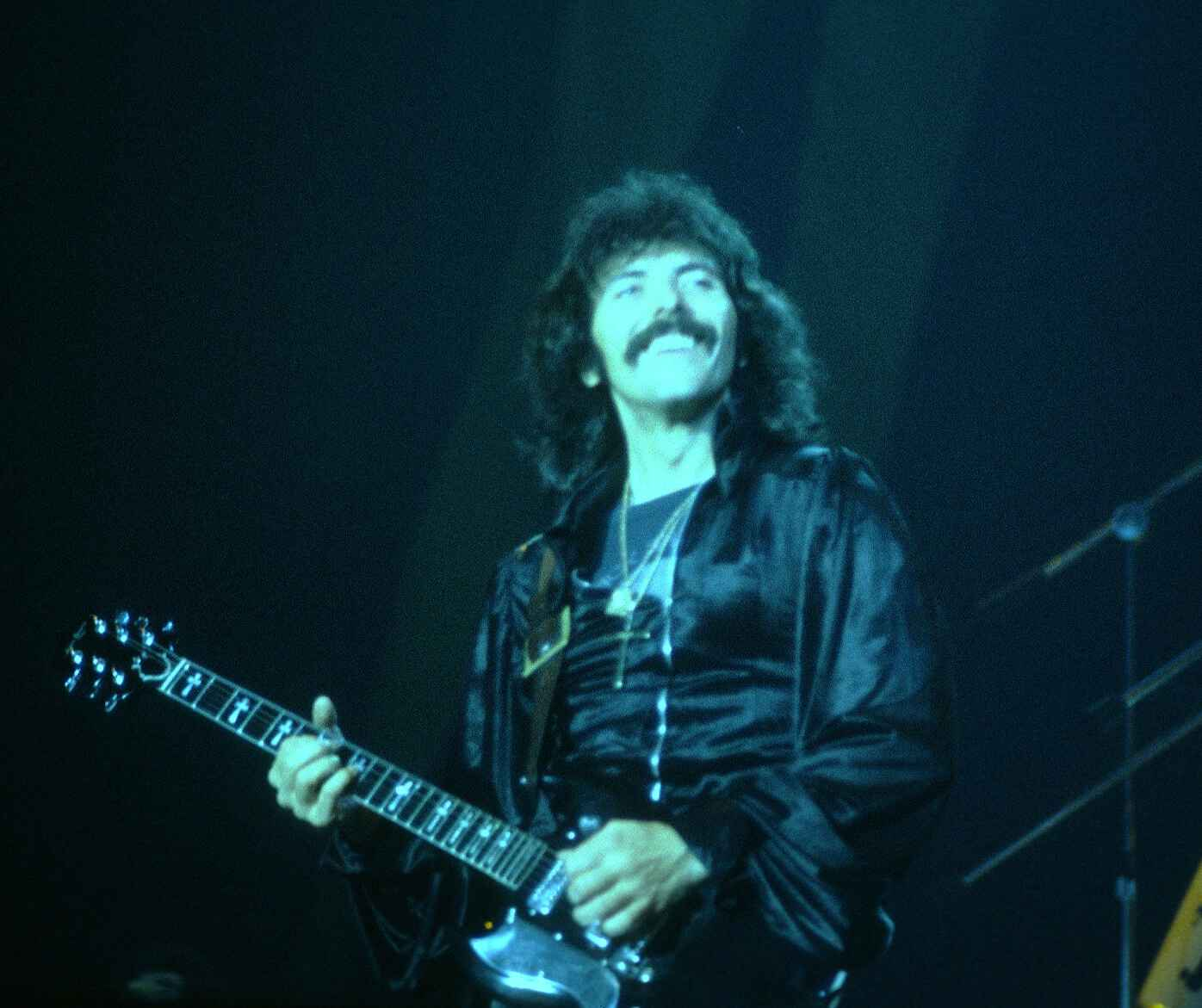
Iommi playing with Black Sabbath in 1978

Following the Never Say Die! tour, Black Sabbath returned to Los Angeles and again rented a house in Bel Air, where they spent nearly a year working on new material for the next album. The entire band were abusing both alcohol and other drugs, but Iommi says Osbourne "was on a totally different level altogether". The band would come up with new song ideas, but Osbourne showed little interest and would refuse to sing them. Pressure from the record label and frustrations with Osbourne's lack of input coming to a head, Iommi made the decision to fire Osbourne in 1979. Iommi believed the only options available were to fire Osbourne or break the band up completely. "At that time, Ozzy had come to an end", Iommi said. "We were all doing a lot of drugs, a lot of coke, a lot of everything, and Ozzy was getting drunk so much at the time. We were supposed to be rehearsing and nothing was happening. It was like, 'Rehearse today? No, we'll do it tomorrow.' It really got so bad that we didn't do anything. It just fizzled out". Ward, who was close with Osbourne, was chosen by Iommi to break the news to the singer in April 1979.

==== Hiring Ronnie James Dio, Heaven and Hell (1980), and Mob Rules (1981) ====
After the albums Technical Ecstasy and Never Say Die! received mixed-to-negative critical reception and failed to recapture the commercial and creative heights of Black Sabbath’s early-1970s peak, the band reached a low point marked by internal dysfunction, substance abuse, and creative stagnation. Ozzy Osbourne had grown increasingly unreliable and disengaged; recording sessions were chaotic, with members often working in isolation or under the influence, and morale had collapsed. Tony Iommi later described the period as "disastrous" and "very difficult" noting that the group was "all so down" and producing little of value. He recalled that without a major change the band would likely have broken up: "Had Ronnie not come along when he did, I think Black Sabbath would have ended there and then."

In the summer of 1979, after Osbourne's dismissal, Iommi and Geezer Butler sought a fresh start. Iommi had met Ronnie James Dio fresh from leaving Rainbow at a party in Los Angeles (introduced by Sharon Arden, later Osbourne). The two had already discussed a possible side project. When Dio arrived at the band's rented Bel Air house for an informal rehearsal, the chemistry was immediate. Iommi played unfinished riffs (including what became "Children of the Sea"), and Dio began singing at once. "When he started singing... Bloody hell... I couldn't believe what was coming out of his little body. That voice was so good" Iommi later said. He added: "I played a couple of guitar riffs I'd been working on, and he just sang away. By the time we'd finished, I knew he was the new Black Sabbath singer." The band deliberately avoided Ozzy sound-alikes; they wanted a different approach. Dio's more melodic, operatic style and willingness to collaborate on arrangements allowed Iommi to write differently - often over chords rather than pure riffs and encouraged extended guitar solos. Manager Don Arden initially opposed the choice, reportedly dismissing Dio as a "midget" but the musicians persisted. The resulting album, Heaven and Hell (1980), updated Sabbath's sound with tighter song structures, soaring vocals, and a more professional edge that aligned with the emerging New Wave of British Heavy Metal while retaining the band's heavy core. Iommi called it "tighter and more professional, with more excitement to what we had done before" and credited Dio with giving the group "a new lease of life" and "something new".

Halfway through the 1980 Heaven & Hell Tour, drummer Bill Ward left due to personal problems. Vinny Appice, recommended in part through industry contacts and his work with Axis, auditioned in Los Angeles and joined for the remainder of the tour (initially on a temporary basis). Iommi found the transition jarring—"I was absolutely petrified... I hadn't played with another drummer for many, many years"—but Appice's solid, powerful style suited the new material. With only Iommi and Butler remaining from the original lineup, the band recorded Mob Rules (1981). The title track originated during a quick session at John Lennon's former home (then owned by Ringo Starr) for the Heavy Metal animated film soundtrack. The album continued the heavier, more anthemic direction begun on Heaven and Hell with Appice fully integrated.

Tensions over business matters, mixing credits on the subsequent live album Live Evil, and personal dynamics escalated during and after the Mob Rules tour. Dio left in 1982 to launch his solo career, taking Appice with him, ending the first Dio-era chapter. Despite the eventual split, Iommi consistently praised the collaboration as the force that revitalized Sabbath at a critical moment.

==== Born Again (1983) and Seventh Star (1986) ====
Following the departure of vocalist Ronnie James Dio and drummer Vinny Appice in 1982, Sabbath's future was in doubt. The band switched management to Don Arden, father of Sharon Osbourne who was married to Ozzy Osbourne. Arden suggested Ian Gillan of Deep Purple as the new vocalist. Iommi was eager to form a new group with Coverdale and drummer Cozy Powell joining him and Butler, but Coverdale and Powell decided to continue with Whitesnake. Gillan was at first reluctant, but his manager convinced him to meet with Iommi and Butler at The Bear, a pub in Oxford. After a night of heavy drinking, Gillan officially committed to the project in February 1983. Iommi told Hit Parader magazine in late 1983 that Gillan was the best candidate, saying "His shriek is legendary". Iommi has claimed the band received an audition tape from Michael Bolton who was then working in hard rock before finding success as a pop-ballad singer. However, Butler claims no such thing happened and said Iommi concocted the Bolton story as "a joke". This claim has also been refuted by Bolton himself, who clarified that it was "only a rumor" which might have originated from his band Blackjack once opening a concert for Ozzy.

Sabbath began recording in May 1983 at Richard Branson's Manor Studio, in the Oxfordshire countryside. The project was originally intended to be a new supergroup, and the members of the group had no intention of billing themselves as Black Sabbath. At some point after recording had been completed, Arden insisted they use the recognizable Sabbath name, and the members were overruled. When the band heard the final product, they were horrified at the muffled mix. In his autobiography, Iommi explains that Gillan inadvertently blew a couple of tweeters in the studio speakers by playing the backing tracks too loud and nobody noticed. "We just thought it was a bit of a funny sound, but it went very wrong somewhere between the mix and the mastering and the pressing of that album...the sound was really dull and muffly. I didn't know about it, because we were already out on tour in Europe. By the time we heard the album, it was out and in the charts, but the sound was awful."

After Bill Ward had left the band for rehab, drummer Bev Bevan was hired for the subsequent tour. Bevan was a friend of Iommi's who knew Don Arden well. The tour was also a breaking point for Butler, who admits in the Black Sabbath: 1978–1992 documentary, "I just got totally disillusioned with the whole thing and I left some time in 1984 after the Born Again tour. I just had enough of it."

As was the case with its predecessor, Born Again, Seventh Star was not intended to be a Black Sabbath record. Last-minute pressure from Warner Brothers stemmed from the belief a Tony Iommi solo record would be less successful. Its sound is a drastic, and intentional, departure from the trademark Sabbath sound. Many of the songs have a very hard rock sound, while some contain a bluesy feel (especially "Heart Like a Wheel"). A tour for the album featured Glenn Hughes only at the first few shows. He was fired five dates into the tour, and replaced by Ray Gillen (not to be confused with former Black Sabbath vocalist Ian Gillan), who completed the North American and European legs of the tour, though several dates in the US were cancelled. W.A.S.P. and Anthrax were opening acts on the North American tour.

==== Hiring Tony Martin, The Eternal Idol (1987), and Headless Cross (1989), and Tyr (1990) ====
Black Sabbath released the thirteenth studio album The Eternal Idol in November 1987. The album was originally to be recorded with Ray Gillen on vocals. According to Bob Daisley, Gillen had struggled with the lyrics and management was not paying him. Gillen quit shortly after their return to England.

A number of singers auditioned for Gillen's spot after he left, including Jon Oliva of Savatage and a then-unknown Tony Martin. Martin was hired to record the vocals under the guidance of Chris Tsangarides. Most tracks were written by Tony Iommi and Bob Daisley (the vinyl version states that all songs were written by Iommi) although some lyrics were modified by Geoff Nicholls.

After the release of Eternal Idol, the band was dropped from both Warner Bros. and Vertigo Records due to its poor sales performance. Coinciding with the band's recent commercial decline, which included the US, Iommi was keen on finding a new record label. He met I.R.S. Records owner and executive Miles Copeland, who persuaded him to sign with the label. Copeland told Iommi, "You know how to write albums, you know what people want. You do it and I'm fine with it."

Bringing Martin in for rehearsals, Iommi asked British drummer Cozy Powell to join Black Sabbath. Iommi had also considered dropping the Black Sabbath name and reforming the band under a different name, but the two decided to continue recording under the name Black Sabbath. Iommi received word from Gloria Butler, wife and manager of Geezer Butler, that Geezer wanted to rejoin the group, but he later opted to join Black Sabbath's former bandmate Ozzy Osbourne's band in support for the No Rest for the Wicked touring lineup. Initially, Iommi questioned whether to bring Ronnie James Dio back or ask David Coverdale again to join the group. However, Powell convinced Iommi to keep Martin,.

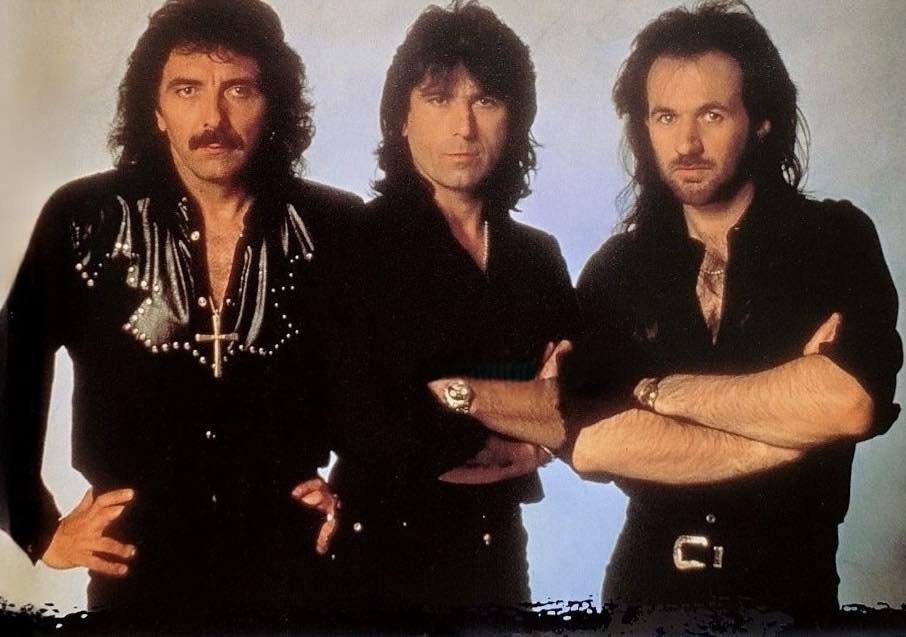
Iommi, Powell, Martin

Headless Cross spent eight weeks on the Billboard 200 chart, peaking at number 115. Sales in the US were low, leading to the curtailment of the tour. Iommi told Sabbath fanzine Southern Cross: "When we had the first record out with I.R.S., Cozy and myself went into record stores in Toronto, Canada, where we are pretty big. Nobody could get the record, it wasn't in the shops... unbelievable. We had such a fight with the local rep. I really came close to chinning him – it really was that bad. At the end of the day, it's us that suffer. They say, 'Oh, it didn't sell.' How can it sell if you haven't got the record in the shops?"

Tyr (/ˈtɪər/) was released on August, 20 1990 in the United Kingdom, and September, 4 in the United States. The album's departure from the darker lyrics of Headless Cross was discussed by Tony Iommi in his 2012 autobiography Iron Man: "For our next album, Tyr, we went back to the Woodcray Studios in February 1990, with me and Cozy producing it again. On Headless Cross, Martin had just come into the band and he assumed, oh, Black Sabbath, it's all about the Devil, so his lyrics were full of the Devil and Satan. It was too much in your face. We told him to be a bit more subtle about it, so for Tyr he did all these lyrics about Nordic gods and whatnot. It took me a while to get my head around that."

==== Rehiring Ronnie James Dio, Dehumanizer (1992), and original lineup reunion ====
During sessions for the Dehumanizer album, Tony Martin made a short comeback when invited by the band to try the songs out. He stayed for just a couple of days and the band continued with Ronnie James Dio. "It was good to try that with Ronnie," Iommi reflected in 1997. "[But] we lost millions on it... because of the time we took to record it, and fly backwards and forwards to the States with everything, all the gear; bringing it back; recording here [the UK]... A lot of messing about and a lot of money wasted... If it came to it again now, we could plan it different and it'd be okay, but we had to try that. Originally Cozy was involved, then he wasn't."

This incarnation of Sabbath ended when Dio's contract with the band ended several days before the Costa Mesa reunion shows in November 1992. According to Iommi, Dio quit because he was asked to support Ozzy Osbourne's final shows at Costa Mesa, referring to Ozzy as a "clown." For the two Costa Mesa shows, the band replaced Dio with Judas Priest frontman Rob Halford; on the second night, Iommi, Butler and original Sabbath drummer Bill Ward joined Osbourne onstage for four songs. Halford and Dio were friends (Dio having been impressed with Halford's work ethic on the 'Stars' project) and Halford would only do the Costa Mesa shows with Dio's blessing, which he received when he spoke with Dio by phone. Both shows were unofficially recorded in their entirety and are now widely circulated as audio and video bootlegs.

==== Rehiring Tony Martin, Cross Purposes (1994) and Forbidden (1995) ====
Dehumanizer saw the reunion of Mob Rules-era Black Sabbath, but after the tour, Ronnie James Dio and Vinny Appice were replaced by former Sabbath vocalist Tony Martin and drummer Bobby Rondinelli for Cross Purposes. The album was recorded at Monnow Valley Studio, in Wales.

Forbidden followed with lineup changes in the band: Geezer Butler was replaced by Neil Murray and Cozy Powell returned in the immediate aftermath of 1994's Cross Purposes tour. Writing and rehearsals took place at Bluestone Farm in Wales, ahead of recording at Parr Street Studios, Liverpool, in December 1994. According to a July 1995 interview by Tony Iommi for the Boston radio station WBCN, the album took ten days to record.

It was launched in June 1995. Musically, the release draws on traditional heavy metal and influences from blues. Ernie C of the rap metal band Body Count produced, recorded and mixed the album. The opening track, "The Illusion of Power", features Body Count member Ice-T delivering a spoken word part during the bridge. "We were pushed into a corner," explained Iommi. "Somebody at the record company suggested we work with Ice-T. My reaction was, 'Who the hell is he?' But we met up and he was a nice bloke, and also a big fan of Sabbath. Ernie C ended up producing Forbidden, which was a terrible mistake. Ernie tried to get Cozy Powell to play these hip-hop-style drum parts, which quite rightly offended him. You don't tell Cozy Powell how to play drums."

==== Ozzfest, Reunion (1998), and 13 (2013) ====
In 1997, Osbourne, Iommi and Butler reunited for the 1997 Ozzfest shows as Black Sabbath. Ward was absent due to health issues, and he was replaced by Faith No More's Mike Bordin. In December, the group was joined by Ward, marking the first reunion of the original quartet since Osbourne's 1992 "retirement show". This line-up recorded two shows at the Birmingham NEC, released as the double album Reunion on 20 October 1998. The album reached number eleven on the Billboard 200, went platinum in the US and spawned the single "Iron Man", which won Sabbath their first Grammy Award in 2000 for Best Metal Performance, 30 years after the song was originally released. Reunion featured two new studio tracks, "Psycho Man" and "Selling My Soul", both of which cracked the top 20 of the Billboard Mainstream Rock Tracks chart.

Shortly before a European tour in the summer of 1998, Ward had a heart attack and was temporarily replaced by former drummer Vinny Appice. Ward returned for a US tour with openers Pantera, which began in January 1999 and continued through the summer, headlining the annual Ozzfest tour. Following these appearances, the band was put on hiatus while members worked on solo material. Iommi released his first official solo album, Iommi, in 2000, while Osbourne continued work on Down to Earth (2001).

Sabbath returned to the studio to work on new material with all four original members and producer Rick Rubin in the spring of 2001, but the sessions were halted when Osbourne was called away to finish tracks for his solo album in the summer. "It just came to an end..." Iommi said. "It's a shame because [the songs] were really good". Iommi commented on the difficulty getting all the members together to work:

It's quite different recording now. We've all done so much in between. In [the early] days there was no mobile phone ringing every five seconds. When we first started, we had nothing. We all worked for the same thing. Now everybody has done so many other things. It's great fun and we all have a good chat, but it's just different, trying to put an album together.

The band remained on hiatus until the summer of 2004 when they returned to headline Ozzfest 2004 and 2005. In November 2005, Black Sabbath were inducted into the UK Music Hall of Fame, and in March 2006, after eleven years of eligibility—Osbourne famously refused the Hall's "meaningless" initial nomination in 1999—the band were inducted into the US Rock and Roll Hall of Fame. At the awards ceremony Metallica played two Sabbath songs, "Hole in the Sky" and "Iron Man" in tribute.

On December 3, 2006, Blabbermouth reported that Rhino Records had set a tentative April 3, 2007 North American release date for the single-disc best-of collection titled Black Sabbath: The Dio Years featuring three new tracks recorded with Ronnie James Dio, Tony Iommi, Geezer Butler, and Vinny Appice. The lineup would eventually tour under Heaven & Hell.

In May 2009, Ozzy Osbourne filed suit in Manhattan federal court alleging that Iommi had improperly claimed sole ownership of the trademark and argued that his "signature lead vocals" were central to the band's success, popularity had dropped sharply during his absence, and that the 1997 reunion had restored the brand's value and prestige. Iommi argued to the continuous nature of his involvement and the earlier agreements in which Osbourne had given up rights after leaving the band in 1980.

Following the death of Ronnie James Dio in May 2010, Iommi and Osbourne announced they had "amicably resolved their problems over the ownership of the Black Sabbath name" and discontinued further court proceedings. Their joint statement stressed that the issue "was never personal, it was always business" and that they were glad to put it behind them and cooperate going forward. Specific terms of the settlement were not publicly detailed, though Osbourne had initially sought 50% interest and shared ownership among the original members.

On 11 November 2011, Black Sabbath announced that they would be reuniting with the original line-up and would be recording a new album. Bill Ward did not participate and was eventually replaced by Rage Against the Machine drummer Brad Wilk for drum sessions. The new album, 13, was released in June 2013. They disbanded at the conclusion of The End Tour in early 2017.

=== Heaven & Hell ===
==== Black Sabbath: The Dio Years (2007), renaming to Heaven & Hell, and The Devil You Know (2009) ====
In 2006, Rhino (which handled the Black Sabbath catalog) prepared a compilation focused on Ronnie James Dio's era with the band. With no suitable unreleased archival material available, the label asked for new songs. Tony Iommi contacted Dio; the pair began writing together (initially at Iommi's home studio in England), and Geezer Butler soon joined. Bill Ward was initially involved but ultimately declined due to commitments and musical differences that would have limited touring, so Vinny Appice-who had played on Mob Rules and Dehumanizer returned on drums. They recorded three new tracks "The Devil Cried", "Shadow of the Wind", and "Ear in the Wall", rather than the originally planned two. These appeared on Black Sabbath: The Dio Years, released in April 2007. Up until this point, Black Sabbath had been touring with Ozzy Osbourne and promoted under Ozzfest since 1997. Osbourne sent Iommi a cease-and-desist letter to prevent Iommi from using the Black Sabbath name.

The sessions with Dio went so well that the group decided to tour the Dio-era material. In October, it was reported that Iommi would tour with Ronnie James Dio, Geezer Butler, and Bill Ward again, but under the name Heaven & Hell. To avoid confusion with the Osbourne-fronted Black Sabbath, they performed under the name Heaven & Hell - taken from the title of the 1980 album that launched Dio's tenure with the band. Iommi explained:

We'd done a lot of great stuff with Dio, and we thought it would be nice to go out under a Heaven and Hell banner so there'd be no confusion[...] If we’d gone out as Black Sabbath, they'd have expected to hear "Paranoid" and "Iron Man". There's nothing wrong with that, but we'd been playing them for 10 years with Ozzy. We last went out with Ronnie and Vinny quite a while ago, and it wasn't the right time then. But this time certainly is.

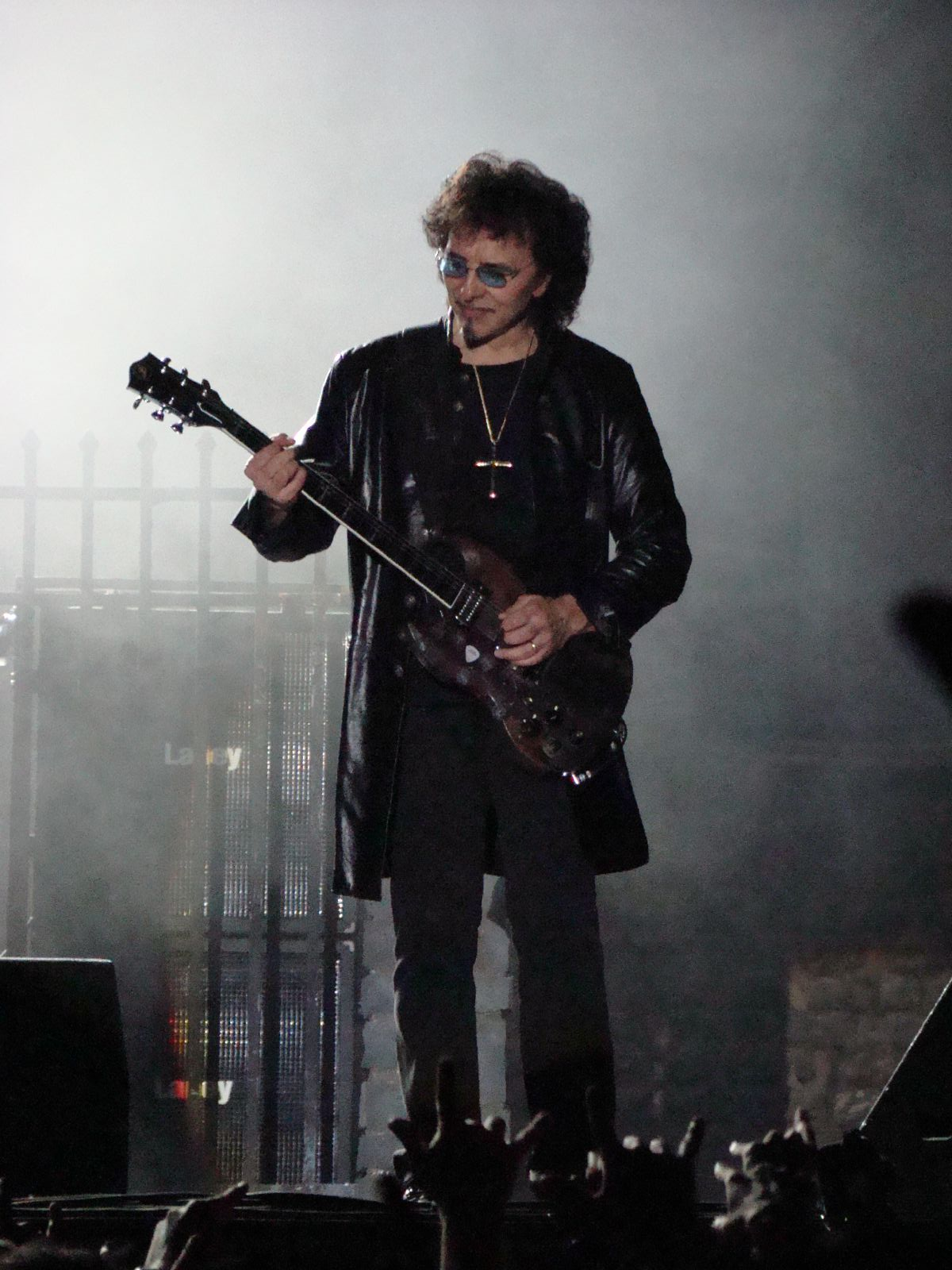
Iommi playing with Heaven & Hell in 2007

Heaven & Hell started an American tour in March 2007 with Megadeth and Down as opening acts. Bill Ward was initially involved but ultimately declined due to commitments and musical differences that would have limited touring. Vinny Appice - who had played on more of the Dio-era Sabbath material returned on drums. The tour finished in November in England with the prospect of an album to follow in 2008. During this period the band's show at the New York Radio City Music Hall was released as both a live DVD and CD with a vinyl release in the UK in 2008. During the summer of 2008 the band embarked on the Metal Masters Tour along with Judas Priest, Motörhead, and Testament.

The band's first and only studio album, The Devil You Know, was released on 28 April 2009. According to Iommi, Heaven & Hell agreed on an album whilst the band was in Japan on their 2007 tour. The band started work on the album before and after the Metal Masters Tour in Dio and Iommi's houses respectively. Each member submitted CDs of material for the project.

Heaven & Hell embarked on a second international tour in support of The Devil You Know. The band's first scheduled date was in Bogotá on 5 May 2009. They were supported by progressive rock acts Coheed and Cambria and The Mars Volta on North America for a select number of shows in August 2009.

On May 4, 2010, the band announced that all planned summer 2010 European appearances had been cancelled. This included their headline slot at Bloodstock Open Air in the UK and dates on the Sonisphere Festival circuit (Switzerland, Czech Republic, Bulgaria, Romania, Turkey, etc.). The official statement read:

We have to announce that all forthcoming Heaven & Hell European shows have been cancelled as sadly Ronnie isn't well enough to tour this summer. We hope that everyone understands and want to thank fans and industry colleagues for their continuing support at this time.

Dio died of stomach cancer in May 2010, and on 14 June 2010, Iommi announced that Heaven & Hell would perform a one-off tribute to Ronnie James Dio at the High Voltage Festival, London on 24 July 2010. This was the band's last performance under the name.

=== Solo career ===
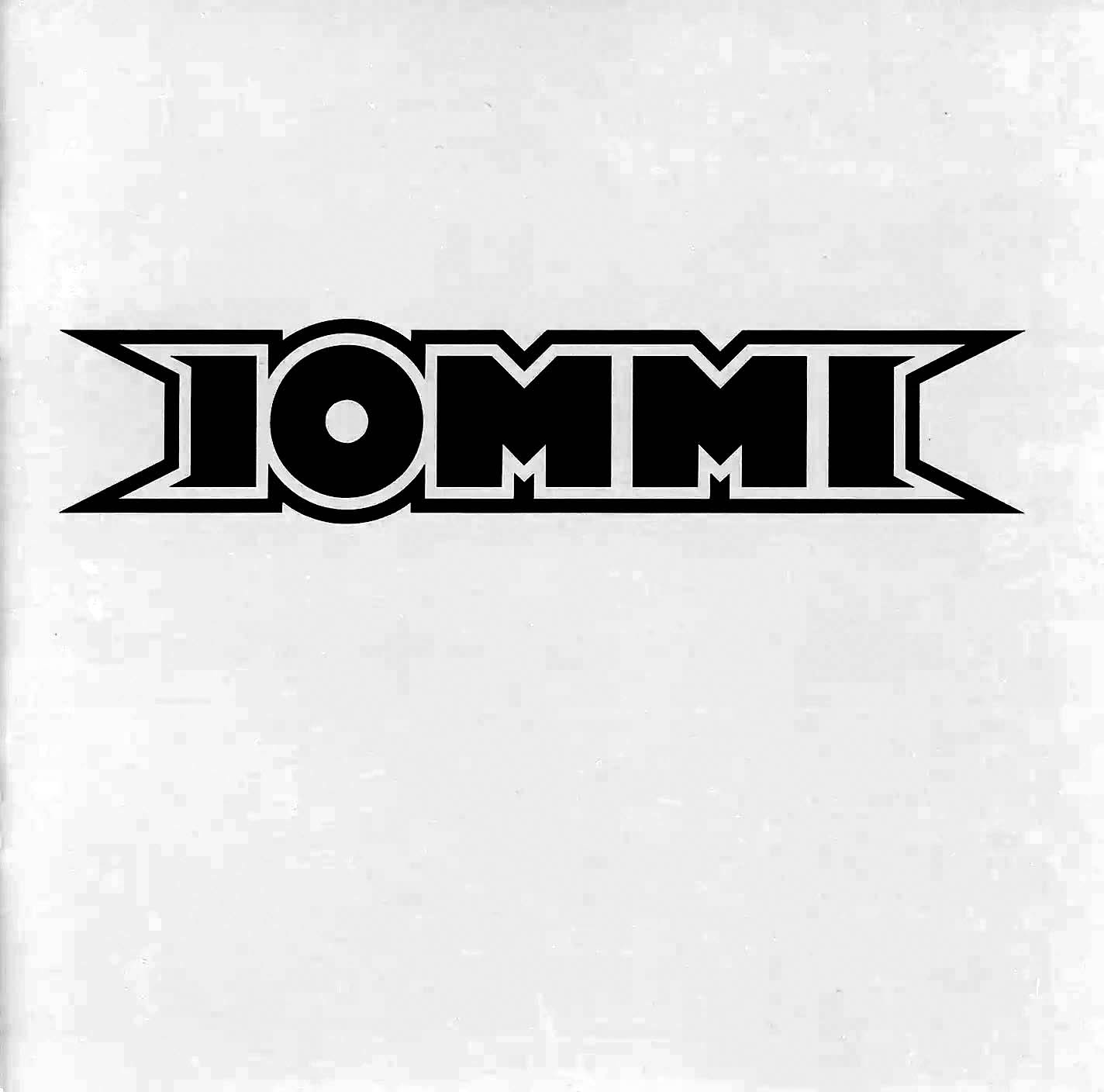
Iommi album cover 2000

==== Iommi (2000) ====
In 2000, Iommi released his first proper solo album, titled Iommi. The album featured several guest vocalists including Ian Astbury, Skin, Henry Rollins, Serj Tankian, Dave Grohl, Billy Corgan, Phil Anselmo, Peter Steele, and Osbourne.

==== The 1996 DEP Sessions (2004) and Fused (2005) ====
In late 2004 Iommi's second solo album was released, titled The 1996 DEP Sessions. This album was originally recorded in 1996 but was never officially released. However, a copy with a drum track by Dave Holland was available as a bootleg called Eighth Star. Glenn Hughes performed vocals on the album.

Hughes again worked with Iommi on the guitarist's 2005 Fused recorded as a trio with drummer Kenny Aronoff.

==== From the Dark (2026) ====
From the Dark initially began as an instrumental project. He put down four or five instrumental tracks, then changed his mind and decided he'd rather make a proper album with a singer. He set the instrumentals aside and started writing new riffs with vocals intended to be added. Because there was no deadline hanging over him, he took his time.

Iommi knew Norwegian singer Jørn Lande from the 2010 Ronnie James Dio tribute show, where Lande had sung a couple of songs. Iommi considered using multiple vocalists, but once Lande started working on tracks, it made sense for Lande to do the whole album. Iommi came up with the riffs, basic structures, and Lande would write melodies and lyrics. Iommi wanted Geezer Butler to play bass, but Butler couldn't do it. Instead, Becky Baldwin fills in on bass, Karl Brazil on drums, and there's also a guitar solo from Brian May on the track "Death Wake". Iommi described it as an album that the band "really enjoyed making", adding that they weren't "trying to prove anything".

In July 2026, Iommi released "World Alone" as the lead single for his album From the Dark, which was released on 23 October 2026.

== Other projects ==
Starting in 1989, Iommi was involved in the Rock Aid Armenia project. In October 2009 Iommi and his colleague Ian Gillan were awarded the Orders of Honour – Armenia's highest order, which were delivered to them by the Prime Minister of Armenia for their help after the Spitak earthquake. They formed the supergroup WhoCares and recorded a single called "Out of my Mind", which was released 6 May 2011 for the benefit of the music school to be built in Gyumri, Armenia. In January 2012, when Iommi was announced to have stage three lymphoma, the Armenian Prime Minister sent a letter of support: "We know your spirit is strong as ever, and we do believe the genius of your inspiration that guides you through the work on the new Black Sabbath album will transform into a boost of strength and energy that you need now, when things look tough". Iommi wrote the song "Lonely Planet", which was sung by Dorians for Armenia in the 2013 Eurovision Song Contest.

In 1992, Iommi appeared at The Freddie Mercury Tribute Concert, playing four songs with the remaining members of Queen and other guest artists.

In 2009, Iommi signed with Mike Fleiss's movie production company Next Films to score a series of horror films titled Black Sabbath.

Iommi made an appearance in 2020 on the track "Astorolus—The Great Octopus" by Candlemass, which received a Grammy nomination.

November 2021, Iommi launched a perfume in collaboration with Italian brand Xerjoff. As well as the scent, Iommi created a track and video, his first instrumental single, "Scent of Dark".

Iommi played guitar on two songs for the 2022 Ozzy Osbourne album Patient Number 9, "No Escape from Now" and "Degradation Rules", the latter winning the Best Metal Performance Grammy in February 2023. In July and August 2022, Iommi performed at both the opening and closing of the Commonwealth Games in Birmingham. At the opening ceremony, Iommi played guitar on a song called "Hear My Voice" performed by British saxophonist and rapper Soweto Kinch. Iommi reunited with Ozzy Osbourne to play at the closing ceremony. They were joined by 2017 Black Sabbath touring musicians Tommy Clufetos and Adam Wakeman for a medley of "Iron Man" and "Paranoid".

He collaborated with Birmingham's Royal Ballet on Black Sabbath – The Ballet, which proved to be a resounding success. His music from the first few Sabbath albums formed the bedrock that the complete music score was based on.

On 21 May 2025, Iommi was featured on English singer-songwriter Robbie Williams' single "Rocket".

== Personal life ==
Iommi holds dual British and Italian citizenship, acquiring the latter due to his parents. Iommi purchased his first house in Stafford in 1972. He also purchased an adjacent property for his parents.

In 2016, Iommi reflected saying that his greatest regret was losing his fingertips when he was 17:

It became a burden. Some people believe the accident invented heavy metal. It helped me invent a new kind of music. I play a new sound and a different style of playing, and a different sort of music. Really, it turned out to be a good thing off a bad thing. But I don't know whether it did. It's just something I've had to learn to live with. It affects your playing style; you can't feel the strings, and there are certain chords I can't play. Right at the beginning I was told by doctors: "You won't be playing guitar." But I believed I could do it, and I did.

=== Relationships ===
Iommi has been married four times. In late 1973, Iommi married Susan Snowden, to whom he had been introduced by Black Sabbath's then-manager Patrick Meehan. The song "Fluff", one of Iommi's instrumental compositions later released on the Sabbath Bloody Sabbath album, was played as Snowden walked down the aisle. Led Zeppelin drummer John Bonham was Iommi's best man for the ceremony. The marriage lasted for three years. Iommi said in a 1991 Guitar World interview that the troubled recording and mixing of Black Sabbath's 1976 album Technical Ecstasy contributed to the end of his marriage.

Iommi married American model Melinda Diaz in 1980. They had a daughter, Toni-Marie Iommi, in 1983, who was the vocalist for the now-defunct band LunarMile. Iommi divorced Melinda in the mid-1980s. When Toni-Marie was 12 years old, Iommi won custody of her after she was placed in foster care. Toni-Marie has described her early childhood with a mentally unbalanced mother as difficult but says that her father finally "saved her". She has stated that with her father she was able to regain trust in other people. Mikko "Linde" Lindström, guitarist with Finnish band HIM, became engaged to Toni-Marie in August 2010. In 2013, the couple were reported to have broken up.

During the mid-1980s Iommi dated and was briefly engaged to rock musician Lita Ford, formerly of the Runaways. Iommi says he co-produced her solo album The Bride Wore Black, which remains unreleased. However, Ford herself has denied Iommi was involved with her career while they dated. She said in a 1989 Kerrang! interview that "there's a certain amount of bad blood between Tony and me." In her 2016 memoir Living Like a Runaway, Ford alleged that the relationship became physically abusive. She claimed that Iommi punched her in the eye on a flight to England and that, after they became engaged, he choked her unconscious during a cocaine-fueled incident and then attempted to strike her with a heavy chair. Ford described the relationship as ending when she left after multiple alleged assaults, later stating that she had no regrets about including the accounts in her book.

In 1986–1987, Iommi met an English woman named Valery, and after a six-year relationship they married. She had a son, Jay, from a previous relationship. They divorced in the late 1990s. Iommi confirmed in the same Guitar World interview referenced above (a co-interview with Metallica's James Hetfield) that he has a son. He told Hetfield regarding the band's so-called "Black Album", that "my son gave me a copy of your latest album...".

In 2005, Iommi married Maria Sjöholm, former vocalist for Swedish alternative metal band Drain STH. They met around 1998, when Tony was working on music for Drain STH. After a year of talking on the phone, Maria relocated to England in 1999 and moved into Tony's home. On 19 August 2005, without telling anyone, Maria and Tony married at the Sunset Marquis hotel. In his book, Iommi calls the low-key wedding the "Best thing I ever did!"

=== Health ===
In early 2012, Iommi was diagnosed with the early stages of lymphoma, for which he underwent successful treatment. Black Sabbath's 2013 tour dates were arranged so that Iommi was free to return to the UK once every six weeks to have an antibody administered. On 3 January 2014, in a New Year message, Iommi announced that he would be finishing his regular treatment some time that year. A few months later, Black Sabbath announced that due to Iommi's health issues, they were undertaking their final tour. As of 11 August 2016, Tony Iommi announced that his cancer was in remission.

According to a report in Rolling Stone magazine from 9 December 2016, Iommi revealed that he was due to have an operation to remove a lump from his throat. In an early 2017 interview with the UK radio show Planet Rock, Iommi explained that the lump was not cancerous.

=== Religion ===
Iommi said in 2016 that he believed in God and was a Catholic, but that he had not attended Mass since childhood. In January 2017, a choral work by Iommi titled "How Good It Is" – with lyrics inspired by Psalm 133 – received its debut performance at Birmingham Cathedral. Catherine Ogle, the Dean of Birmingham, said, "This is a most wonderful gift Tony offered to the cathedral." Despite this, Iommi clarified to NBC News that "How Good It Is" wasn't anything to do with religion: "I don't follow any religious path... religiously", he stated.

In his autobiography, Iommi writes that his parents were Catholics but were not regular churchgoers. He continues, "I hardly go to church either. I wouldn't know what to do there. I actually do believe in a God, but I don't feel that I have to press the point."

== Legacy ==
Tony Iommi of Black Sabbath - geograph.org.uk - 8319745

Iommi is widely regarded as one of the greatest rock guitarists of all time. In 2005, Metal Hammer magazine ranked him number 1 on the poll of the "Riff Lords", praising his "highly distinctive style of fretsmanship that's economical yet crushingly effective". In 2007, Classic Rock magazine ranked him number 6 on their list of the "100 Wildest Guitar Heroes". In 2011, Rolling Stone magazine ranked him number 25 in their list of the "100 Greatest Guitarists of All Time". Joel McIver ranked him the 6th greatest metal guitarist of all time. In 2012, readers of Guitar World ranked Iommi the seventh-greatest rock guitarist of all time. Editors of the same magazine ranked him the greatest heavy metal guitarist of all time.

Ian Anderson of Jethro Tull said: "Tony managed to turn his physical impairment around into something that makes him one of the guitar legends – if not for his dexterity of playing but at least for the fact that his contribution to rock music is a unique one". Gene Simmons of Kiss regarded him as "the man who came up with the riffs that launched an army of guitar players"; Ozzy Osbourne called him "the master of the metal riff", and Ronnie James Dio called him "the ultimate riff master".

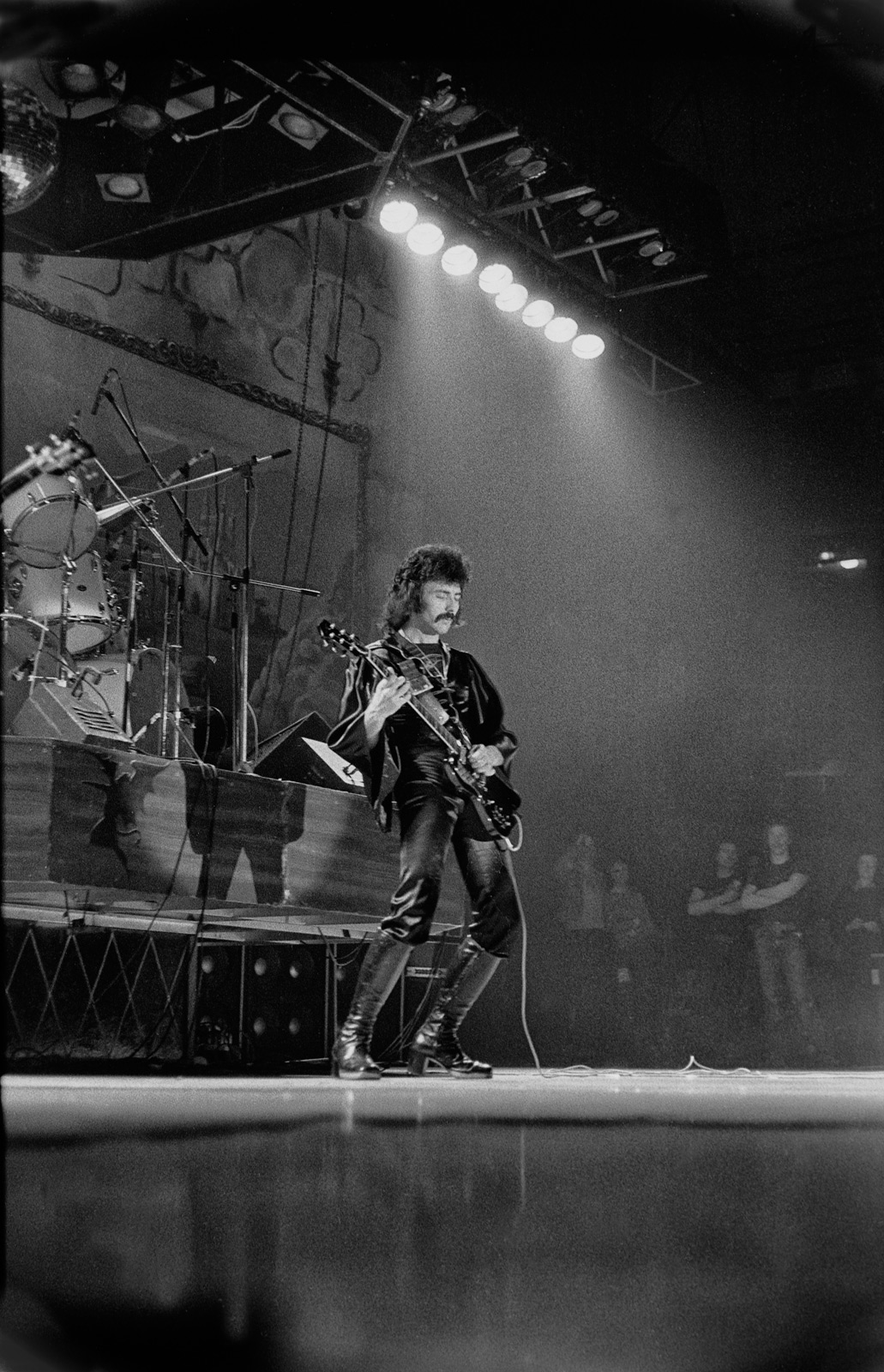
BlackSabbatIommy01-kl

Furthermore, Iommi is recognised by many as the main creator of heavy metal music. Brian May of Queen considers him "the true father of heavy metal"; Eddie Van Halen stated that "without Tony, heavy metal wouldn't exist. He is the creator of heavy!"; and James Hetfield of Metallica, who was profoundly influenced by Iommi, defined him "the king of the heavy riff". Rob Halford, vocalist for Judas Priest, when filling in for Ozzy Osbourne during an August 2004 concert in Philadelphia, introduced Iommi to the audience as "the man who invented the heavy metal riff". Michael Amott of Carcass and Arch Enemy considers Iommi his "guitar hero" and the world's greatest guitarist "because he invented the heavy tone and evil riff". According to Lamb of God singer Randy Blythe, "Iommi is the reason heavy metal exists". HP Newquist of the National Guitar Museum stated that "his guitar playing has defined the sound of heavy metal for more than four decades, and he has influenced countless thousands– if not millions– of players."

He has been credited as the forerunner of other styles: Martin Popoff defined him as "the godfather of stoner rock"; Jeff Kitts and Brad Tolinski of Guitar World assert that "grunge, goth, thrash, industrial, death, doom... whatever. None of it would exist without Tony Iommi". According to Hawaii Public Radio: "it is hard to imagine Nirvana, Soundgarden, Pearl Jam or Alice in Chains without Black Sabbath, and without Tony Iommi. Judas Priest, Iron Maiden, Scorpions, Metallica, Slayer, Pantera and essentially every metal band can be traced to the musical framework found in Iommi compositions".

Many notable musicians count Iommi as a major influence on their own playing; some of them include Jeff Hanneman (Slayer), Dimebag Darrell (Pantera), Slash (Guns N' Roses, Velvet Revolver), Scott Ian (Anthrax), Zakk Wylde (Ozzy Osbourne, Black Label Society), Tom Morello (Rage Against the Machine), Billy Corgan (the Smashing Pumpkins), Kim Thayil (Soundgarden), and Nick Oliveri (Kyuss, Queens of the Stone Age). Jerry Cantrell of Alice in Chains was strongly influenced by Iommi's dark bendings, which he uses often. Andy LaRocque of King Diamond said that the clean guitar part of "Sleepless Nights" from the Conspiracy album is inspired by Iommi's playing on Never Say Die!.

== Awards and accolades ==
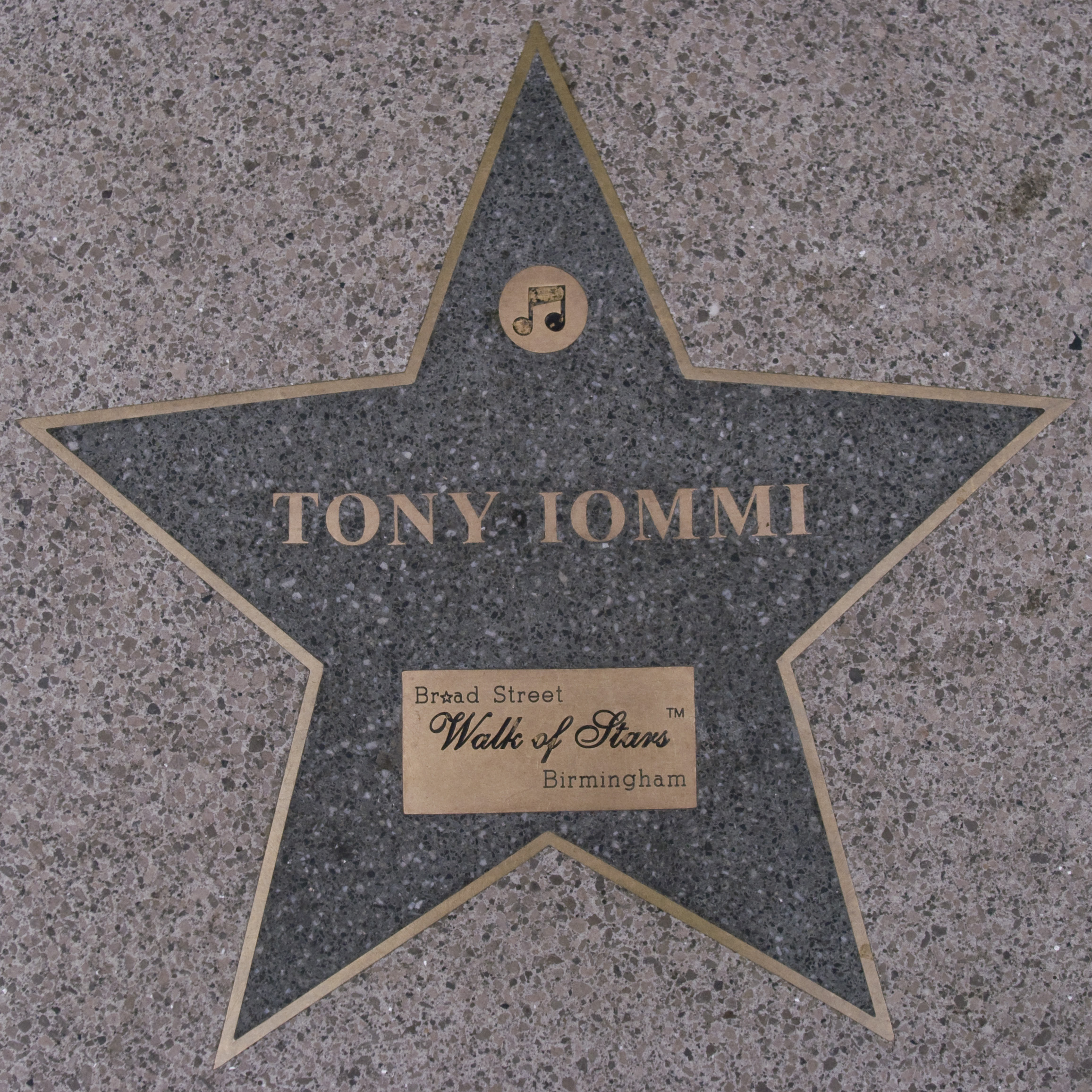
Star on Birmingham Walk of Stars

Iommi has won a number of awards. These include Q Awards (Gibson Les Paul Award, 2015), the Lifetime Achievement Award from the National Guitar Museum, Kerrang! Awards (Icon, 2018), as well as three Grammy Awards. In November 2008, Iommi had a star revealed on the Birmingham Walk of Stars.

On 19 November 2013, Iommi received an Honorary Doctorate of Arts degree from Coventry University. The honorary degree came "in recognition of his contribution to the world of popular music", and recognised "his role as one of the founding fathers of heavy metal music and his status as one of the industry's most influential figures", the university said. Iommi is also a visiting professor of music at Coventry University.

One week before their farewell "Back to the Beginning" concert, Iommi and the other original members of Black Sabbath were each made Freemen of the City of Birmingham.

Iommi was appointed Member of the Order of the British Empire (MBE) in the 2026 Birthday Honours for services to music and charity.

== Equipment ==
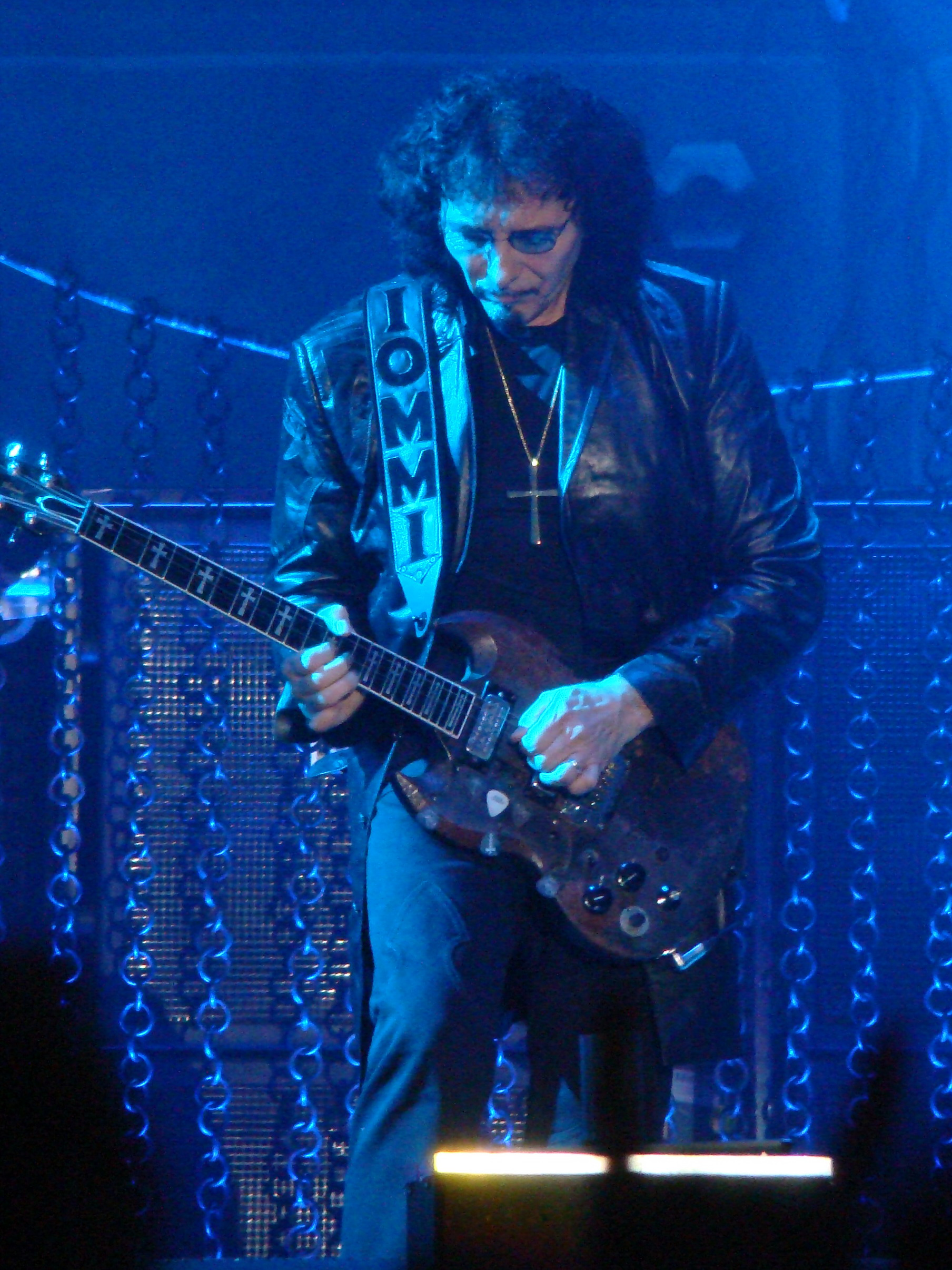
Iommi in 2009

Iommi's deep and heavy sound was partly born out of necessity– his "revolutionary signature sound" being the result of the accident and the subsequent downtuning by three semitones. He said that his "extreme volume" was likewise necessary, "because we were fed up with people talking over us while we were playing."

=== Guitars ===
"It was the same with 24-fret necks. I put money into a company because I couldn't get guitars built the way I wanted them. I had to prove it to the manufacturers. So I put money into John Birch guitars, and he built my guitars. I had to prove it worked. All of this was done by experimenting and trial and error. I paid for that myself in the early days to show it could be done. And I paid for all these companies to get the benefits nowadays. Back then they all said it couldn't be done. I also used locking nuts years and years ago without a tremolo, before locking nuts were the norm."

— Tony Iommi
- Jaydee Custom SGs

Built in Birmingham by luthier John Diggins sometime between 1975 and 1978, the guitar was first used for overdubs on the 'Heaven and Hell' album and later became one of Iommi's main guitars. The guitar is equipped with a 24 fret neck with custom cross inlays, four control knobs (three of which are functional), a disconnected second output jack, a hole for a master volume knob on the pick guard covered up with a black stopper and a highly distressed finish. He had two more built for him. One was made to the same specifications of his first Jaydee SG with a red finish. Another one was made and used during the Born Again era, which can be seen on the music videos for "Trashed" and "Zero the Hero". The differences are the finish, headstock, use of a stoptail bridge, and use of rail humbuckers, as opposed to the 18-pole humbuckers on his two other versions.

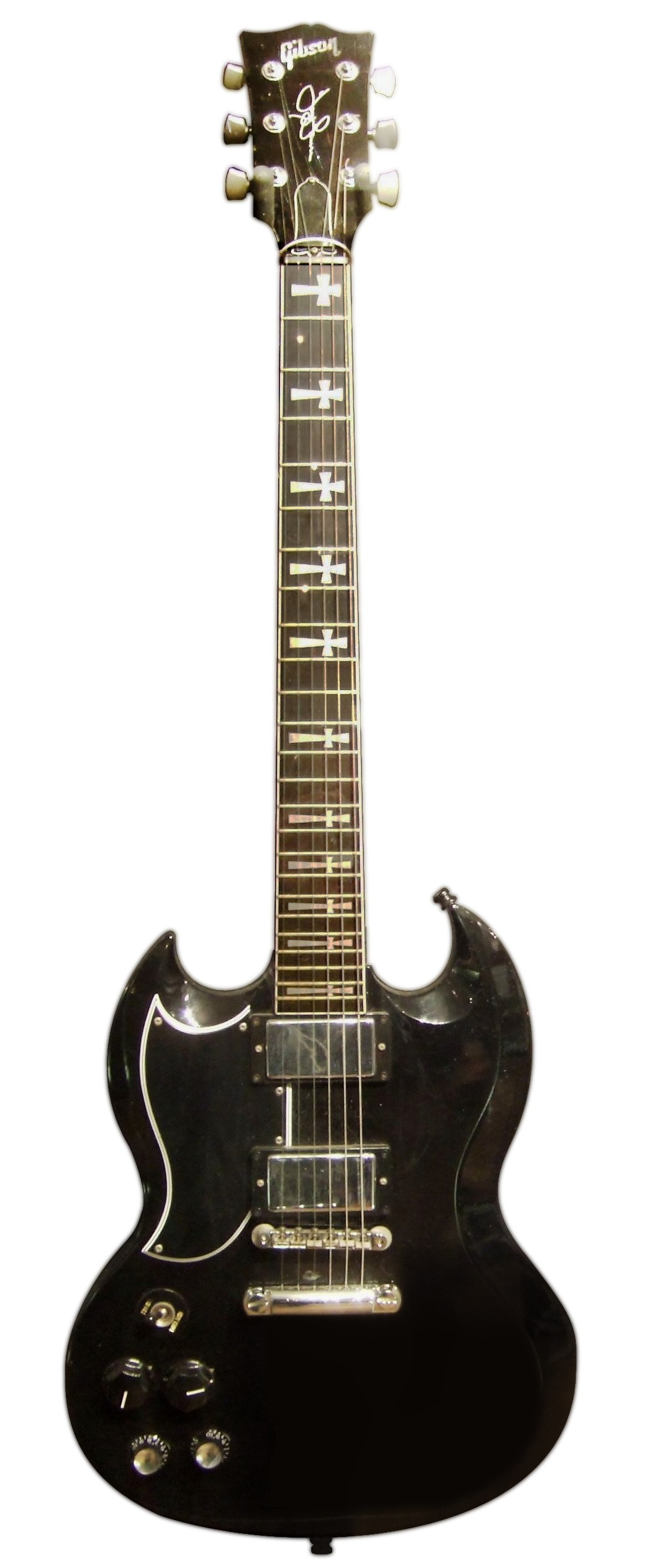
Tony Iommi's signature Gibson SG guitar

- Gibson SG, aka "Monkey"

A 1965 Gibson SG Special in red finish fitted with a Gibson P-90 pick-up in the bridge position and a custom-wound John Birch Simplux, a P-90 style single coil in the neck position. The guitar became Iommi's main instrument after his white Stratocaster's neck pick-up failed during the recording of Black Sabbath's self-titled album. It is currently on permanent display at the New York City Hard Rock Cafe .

- Gibson Custom Shop SG

The guitar was built by the Gibson Custom Shop in Nashville after Iommi's specifications and finished in 1997. The guitar is one of two made as prototypes for the Gibson Custom Shop Limited Edition Iommi Special SG. The guitar features a neck with 24 frets and four control knobs, of which only two are active (much like his old Jaydee Custom guitar).

On 11 August 2010, Iommi announced on his website that this guitar was stolen from the RJD tribute show that Heaven & Hell performed at High Voltage on 24 July 2010. He asked that anyone with information or leads to contact him; he offered a reward for its safe return.

- Epiphone P94 Iommi SG

A stock Epiphone SG signature model in black finish fitted with P-94 pick-ups which is a version of the Gibson P-90 pick-up designed to fit into existing humbucker housings.

- Gibson SG Standard

A regular left-handed version of the SG fitted with two extra frets to give Iommi the full two octaves which he prefers. The guitar is equipped with his signature pick-up. Iommi was the first guitarist to have a signature pick-up designed and built by Gibson. He also has another model fitted with a Floyd Rose floating tremolo.

"I also came up with a guitar with interchangeable pickups you could slot in from the back. It was a John Birch guitar. We only sold one, and Roy Orbison bought it. I came up with that years ago and the first one was made for me to use in the studio. At the time I had a lot of problems tuning guitars because of the neck and the light strings on the Gibson. I decided to come up with a guitar that I could use in the studio with different sounds so that I didn't have to keep changing guitars. You could slot a pickup in it and get a Fender sound, then slot a different pickup in it and get a Gibson sound. That was the idea. I did use it for a while, but they were too expensive to mass-produce."

— Tony Iommi
- Fender Stratocaster

Iommi played a Fender Stratocaster that was spray-painted white by Iommi and his father during the early days with Black Sabbath. However, the neck pick-up malfunctioned during the recording of their first album, so Iommi quickly turned to his backup Gibson SG to finish the record. Iommi owns two Stratocasters, one of which has been modified with his signature pick-up in the bridge position.

- St. Moritz Tony Iommi Custom SG

Custom built for Iommi by St. Moritz guitars, this is a replica of Iommi's Gibson SG "Monkey". It was used on the 13 album and for the tour.

- BC Rich Ironbird

Custom built for Iommi by BC Rich. Features include Dimarzio pick-ups, two built-in preamps, scalloped fretboard, and Iommi's trademark cross inlays. This guitar can be seen in Tony's Star Licks Video, for Star Licks Productions along with a left handed BC Rich mockingbird.

- Gibson Barney Kessel

A rare left-handed version of the jazz guitarist Barney Kessel artist model, built sometime in the first half of the 1960s.

- Epiphone Riviera 12 string

Originally a regular right-handed version in red finish that was converted by Epiphone to a left-handed version to fit Iommi.

- LaBella custom gauge strings
- Shure Wireless systems
- A Gibson Tony Iommi Signature Pick Up has been available for the past two decades. The pick-up got its first 'blooding' on the Black Sabbath reunion/Ozzfest tour in the summer of 1997, loaded into an SG that J.T. Riboloff of Gibson built. They also feature in the two SGs (one black and one red) that the Gibson Custom Shop built for Iommi in late 1997, as prototypes for the Tony Iommi special Custom Shop model. The pick-up is still in production, and available in silver, gold or black covers. It has been used in the Custom Shop models, the factory Iommi SG and most recently in the Epiphone Iommi SG.

=== Effects ===
- Boss chorus pedal
- Boss octave pedal
- Dallas Rangemaster Treble Booster
- Drawmer LX22 compressor
- Korg DL8000R multi-tap delay
- Korg SDD1000 rackmount delay
- Peavey Addverb III
- Tycobrahe wah pedal

=== Amplifiers ===
- Laney TI100 Tony Iommi Signature: Current main amp. Two channel version of the GH100TI.
- Laney GH 100 TI Tony Iommi Signature amplifiers: Iommi's main up from 1993 to early 2012.
- ENGL Powerball Amplifiers: only used in 2009
- Laney 4×12 cabinets
- Various Marshall amplifiers: from early to mid-1980s to 1993, including 9005 Power Amplifiers and 9001 Preamps, 4×12" speaker cabinets, 2554 Silver Jubilee Combo, 2558 Silver Jubilee Combo, Paul Reed Smith modded JCM800 head. Marshall 1959 Super Lead modified by John "Dawk" Stillwell for Heaven and Hell and Mob Rules.
- Laney Supergroup Heads: his main amplifier from 1968 to 1979. For Black Sabbath's 'The End' tour, Laney re-engineered the original Iommi amp, LA 100BL (Supergroup) and these amps were used throughout the tour.
- Orange 1972 w/ 4x12 cab Only used for the filming of the music videos for Iron Man and Paranoid.
- Laney Klipp: used on Master of Reality (Requires source verification?)
- Mesa Boogie Mark series heads: from the mid-1980s to the early 1990s
- Vox AC30 Top Boost during the recording sessions for the album Paranoid

== Discography ==
=== Black Sabbath ===
- Black Sabbath (1970)
- Paranoid (1970)
- Master of Reality (1971)
- Vol. 4 (1972)
- Sabbath Bloody Sabbath (1973)
- Sabotage (1975)
- Technical Ecstasy (1976)
- Never Say Die! (1978)
- Heaven and Hell (1980)
- Mob Rules (1981)
- Born Again (1983)
- Seventh Star (1986)
- The Eternal Idol (1987)
- Headless Cross (1989)
- Dehumanizer (1992)
- Cross Purposes (1994)
- Forbidden (1995)
- 13 (2013)

=== Iommi ===
- Iommi (2000)
- The 1996 DEP Sessions (2004)
- Fused (2005)
- From the Dark (2026)

=== Heaven & Hell ===
- The Devil You Know (2009)

=== WhoCares ===
- Ian Gillan & Tony Iommi: WhoCares (2012)

=== Singles ===
Title	Year	Peak chart positions	Album
Title	Year	US Main.	Album
"Goodbye Lament" (featuring Dave Grohl)	2000	10	Iommi
"World Alone" (featuring Jørn Lande)	2026	29	From the Dark
"Stormwatcher" (featuring Jørn Lande)	2026	—	From the Dark
