= Iommi (album) =

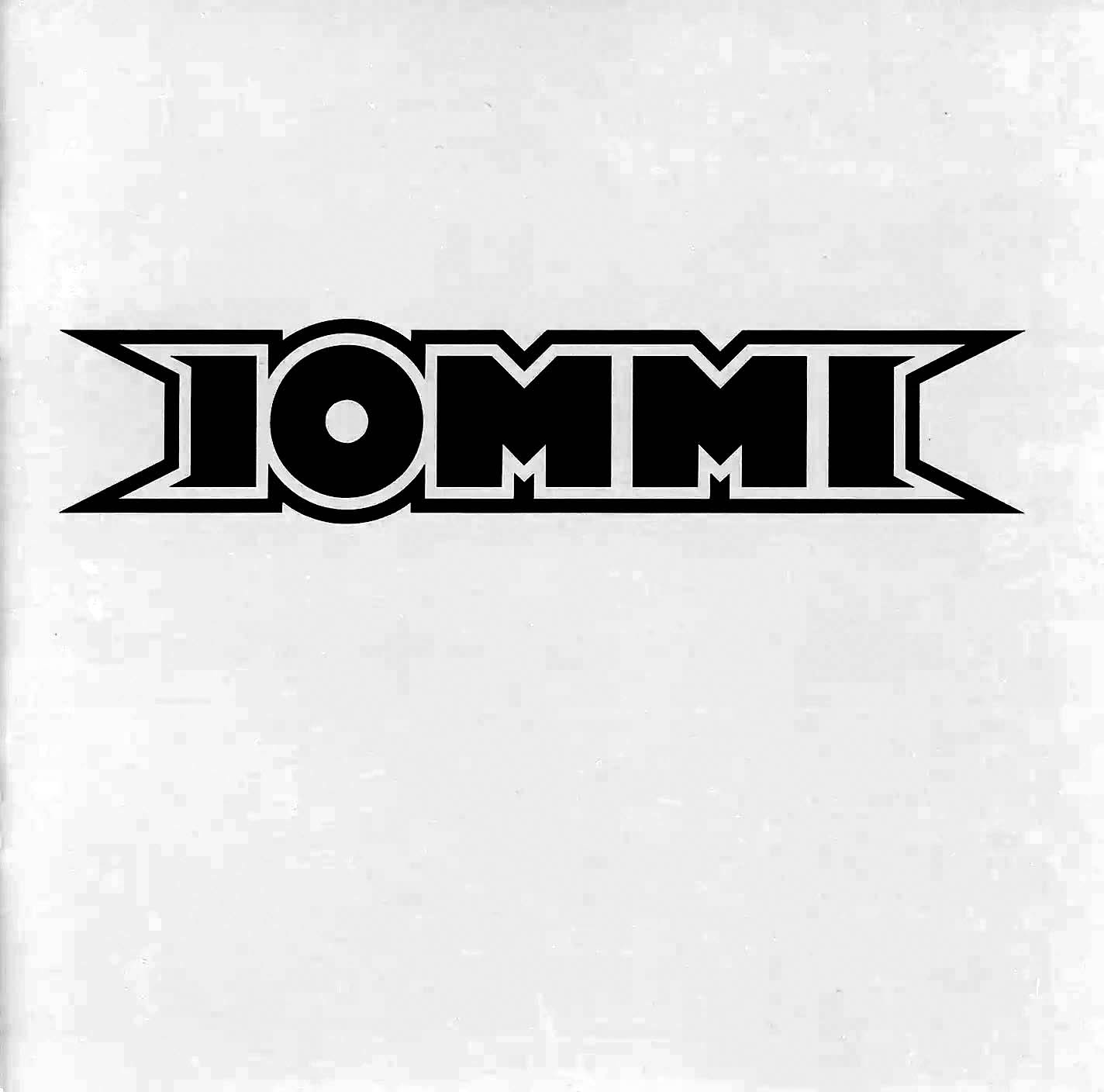

Studio album by Tony Iommi
- Released: 17 October 2000
- Recorded: 1996–2000
- Genres: Heavy metal; hard rock
- Length: 51:08
- Labels: Divine, Priority
- Producer: Bob Marlette

Tony Iommi chronology
| Iommi (2000) | The 1996 DEP Sessions (2004) |

Iommi is the debut solo studio album by British heavy metal guitarist Tony Iommi.

The album took nearly five years to make. All of the songs were written by Iommi, producer Bob Marlette and the respective vocalists of each track (except "Black Oblivion", which was written by Iommi and Billy Corgan).

== Other songs written ==
In an interview with Cosmik Conversations, Iommi said that they "actually wrote a few tracks with Billy Idol...three with Phil Anselmo...and two tracks with Billy Corgan, but you know, we could only use one of each." There is also a track entitled "Something Wicked This Way Comes" written and recorded with Scooter Ward of the band Cold that was not included on the album. The bulk of the music for that track was used for Peter Steele's song, "Just Say No to Love". The track has been available through various filesharing networks. One of the unreleased tracks with Phil Anselmo is a faster-paced song entitled "Inversion of the Saviours". It has also been available through various file sharing networks.

== Black Sabbath band members on the album ==
Tony Iommi's career is closely linked to his time in Black Sabbath, a band he led from its formation in 1968 to its retirement in 2017. Iommi also formed the band Heaven & Hell, a group featuring a collection of former Black Sabbath band members that had performed together under the Black Sabbath name in the past.

A number of musicians associated with Black Sabbath appear on Iommi. Track 9 features Black Sabbath vocalist Ozzy Osbourne (1968–1978, 1978–1979, 1996–2006, 2011–2017) and drummer Bill Ward (1968–1980, 1983, 1984, 1994, 1997–2006, 2011–2012). The track also features bassist Laurence Cottle, who was a session musician on Black Sabbath's studio album Headless Cross. Cottle also plays bass on tracks 3–5 and 7–9 on Iommi. Tracks 3 and 7 feature guitarist Brian May, of Queen, who had previously contributed a guitar solo to the Headless Cross album and performed with Black Sabbath on their 1989 tour. He also played alongside Iommi at The Freddie Mercury Tribute Concert in 1992.

== Reception ==
Professional ratings
Review scores
| Source | Rating |
|---|---|
| AllMusic | 3/5 stars |
| Rock Hard | 8/10 |
| The Village Voice | (dud) |

In 2005, Iommi was ranked number 451 in Rock Hard magazine's book of The 500 Greatest Rock & Metal Albums of All Time.

== Track listing ==
| No. | Title | Writer(s) | Guest musicians | Length |
|---|---|---|---|---|
| 1. | "Laughing Man (In the Devil Mask)" | Iommi, Marlette, Rollins | Henry Rollins – vocals; Terry Phillips – bass; Jimmy Copley – drums | 3:42 |
| 2. | "Meat" | Iommi, Marlette, Skin | Skin – vocals; Martin "Ace" Kent – additional guitars; Bob Marlette – bass; John Tempesta – drums | 4:55 |
| 3. | "Goodbye Lament" | Iommi, Marlette, Grohl | Dave Grohl – vocals, drums; Brian May – additional guitars; Laurence Cottle – bass | 4:52 |
| 4. | "Time Is Mine" | Iommi, Marlette, Anselmo | Philip Anselmo – vocals; Laurence Cottle – bass; Matt Cameron – drums | 4:58 |
| 5. | "Patterns" | Iommi, Marlette, Tankian | Serj Tankian – vocals; Laurence Cottle – bass; Jimmy Copley – drums | 4:22 |
| 6. | "Black Oblivion" | Iommi, Corgan | Billy Corgan – vocals, bass, additional guitars; Kenny Aronoff – drums | 8:22 |
| 7. | "Flame On" | Iommi, Marlette, Astbury | Ian Astbury – vocals; Brian May – additional guitars; Laurence Cottle – bass; Matt Cameron – drums | 4:31 |
| 8. | "Just Say No to Love" | Iommi, Marlette, Steele | Peter Steele – vocals, bass; Laurence Cottle – bass; Matt Cameron – drums | 4:29 |
| 9. | "Who's Fooling Who" | Iommi, Marlette, Osbourne | Ozzy Osbourne – vocals; Laurence Cottle – bass; Bill Ward – drums | 6:12 |
| 10. | "Into the Night" | Iommi, Marlette, Idol | Billy Idol – vocals; Ben Shepherd – bass; Matt Cameron – drums | 5:06 |
| Total length: | | | | 51:08 |

== Credits ==
Writing, performance and production credits are adapted from the album liner notes.

=== Personnel ===
- Tony Iommi – guitars

==== Additional musicians ====
- Bob Marlette – keyboard, programming

==== Production ====
- Ralph Baker – executive production
- Bob Marlette – production, engineering, mixing

==== Additional Engineering ====
- Tobias Miller: Recording engineer
- German Villacorta: Recording engineer
- Phil Blackman: Recording engineer
- Stuart Campbell: Recording engineer
- Fran Flannery: Recording engineer
- Tom Fritze: Recording engineer
- Aaron Pratley: Recording engineer

==== Visual art ====
- Art Shoji – art direction
- Maggie Magarian – art direction, design
- William Hames – photography
- Ross Halfin – photography
- Mike Clement – photography
- Gene Kirkland – photography
- JMO Design – logo

=== Studios ===
- A&M Studios – recording
- Chipping Norton – recording
- Long View Farm – recording
- Sunset Marquis Hotel – recording
- Olympic Studios – recording

== Charts ==
| Chart | Peak position |
|---|---|
| German Albums (Offizielle Top 100) | 43 |
| US Billboard 200 | 129 |
