= Myth (disambiguation) =

Myth is a folklore genre consisting of narratives that play a fundamental role in society. Subsets include:

Myth may also refer to:

- Urban myth, a story circulated as true, often attributed to "a friend of a friend".
- Origin myth, which purports to describe the origin of some feature of the natural or social world
  - Creation myth, symbolic narrative of how the world began and how people first came to inhabit it
- National myth, inspiring narrative or anecdote about a nation's past
- Political myth, ideological explanation for a political phenomenon that is believed by a social group

== Music ==
- Myth: The Xenogears Orchestral Album, an album by Yasunori Mitsuda
- "Myth" (song), by Beach House from the album Bloom
- Myth (album), by Two Steps from Hell
- Myth, a unit of Hololive

== Video games ==
- Myth (1989 video game), a 1989 text adventure by Magnetic Scrolls
- Myth: History in the Making, a 1989 platform game by System 3
- Myth (video game series), a 1997–2001 series of real-time tactical computer games, including:
  - Myth: The Fallen Lords
  - Myth II: Soulblighter
  - Myth III: The Wolf Age

== Other uses ==
- Myth (gamer), a video game streamer and esports player
- Myth (warez), an underground PC game cracking group
- Myth-, a prefix in the MythTV open source software project
- M.Y.T.H. Inc., a corporation in Robert Asprin's MythAdventures series
- "Myth", a disc golf putter by Infinite Discs
- "Myth", a season 4 episode of Servant (TV series)
- Myth: Its Meaning and Functions in Ancient and Other Cultures by G. S. Kirk

== See also ==
- The Myth (disambiguation)
- Mythic (disambiguation)
- Mythology (disambiguation)
- Mythos (disambiguation)
- Mythopoeia
