= Mythos Island =

Mythos Island is a nine-part comic series made for Egmont (in the USA published in Walt Disney's Comics and Stories #s 657-661). It is a crossover between the Mickey Mouse universe and the Duck universe. It is written by Pat and Carol McGreal and Per Erik Hedman and drawn by César Ferioli.

== Chapters ==
=== 1: Mything one Island ===
Donald Duck, Scrooge McDuck and Huey, Dewey, and Louie receive a map from an uncharted island and find it is home to some characters from Greek mythology.

=== 2: Mysteries and Myths ===
Mickey Mouse and Goofy receive a map to the same island that the ducks discover in the previous chapter and stop war between characters from English mythology and characters from Greek mythology.

=== 3: Pegasus ===
Huey, Dewey, and Louie try to keep Peggy the winged horse that followed them home from Mythos Island a secret from Scrooge and Peggy saves Scrooge's airline license from Flintheart Glomgold.

=== 4: The Unicorn Horn ===
Mickey has his Unicorn's Horn stolen from him by Philcher and Cheatum and has to get it back.

=== 5: Drag of the Dragon ===
All the characters go back to Mythos Island and they get separated on the way. Mickey and Donald help an English Dragon get over heartburn by finding his lost cousin.

=== 6: Menace in the Mist ===
Minnie Mouse and Daisy Duck go to the island in search for their boyfriends and encounter all kinds of danger along the way.

=== 7: Searching for the Girls ===
Mickey, Donald, and their companions discover that Minnie and Daisy are on the island and organize three teams to search for them.

=== 8: The Inventors' Task ===
Gyro Gearloose and Doc Static find their way to Mythos Island and Master Mythos asks them to help him with his matter transporter. It is revealed that the island highly depends on people believing its existence and its creatures, which is beginning to vanish.

=== 9: Back from the Brink ===
While Mickey and Donald go back to their hometowns to get Gyro and Doc's matter transporters, their companions do what they can to help the natives of Mythos Island survive. The island rematerializes once both the transporter is complete and enough people have sighted the mythical creatures.

== Characters that appear in the story ==
- Donald Duck
- Scrooge McDuck
- Huey, Dewey, and Louie
- Gyro Gearloose
- Mickey Mouse
- Goofy
- Doc Static
- Flintheart Glomgold
- Philcher and Cheatum
- Minnie Mouse
- Pluto
- Daisy Duck

== Structure of the series ==
This is one of the longest crossover stories between the Mickey Mouse universe and the Donald Duck universe (behind only the Italian story "The Search for the Zodiac Stone").

Each chapter alternates between the two different universes until Chapter 5 (the Duck Universe in Chapters 1 and 3, and the Mickey Mouse Universe in Chapters 2 and 4).

In Chapter 9, it is revealed that Chapters 2 and 3 take place at the same time.

In Chapter 2, Doc mentions that he and Gyro are rival inventors, but in Chapter 8, they are shown to be friends so the rivalry is not serious; they are just two friendly inventors trying to win the same contest.

Out of all the major villains in the Disney Comics Universe, Flintheart Glomgold is the only one to make an appearance, and he appeared in Chapter 3.

Mickey and Donald have a lot of slapstick humor in Chapter 5, despite the fact that this is an adventure story.

A lot of the characters in this story interact with characters that they don't usually interact with: Mickey and Donald, Minnie and Daisy, Goofy and Scrooge, Gyro and Doc Static, Pluto and the Nephews.

This story has similar structure to the story known as "The Orb Saga", which is printed in Walt Disney's Comics and Stories #673-676.
