= Mythos (Mythos album) =

Studio album by Mythos
- Released: 1972
- Recorded: October – November 1971; Dierks-Studio, Stommeln, Germany
- Genres: Rock, Krautrock
- Length: 38:52
- Labels: LP Ohr OMM, Neutron Star, CD Spalax
- Producer: Dieter Dierks

Mythos chronology
Mythos (1972)	Dreamlab (1975)

Professional ratings
Review scores
Source	Rating
Allmusic	4.5/5 stars

The first Mythos LP was released in 1972, on the legendary 'Krautrock' label Ohr. On 'Mythos' the band realized a mixture of art rock and psychedelic with oriental influences in lengthy pieces. Stephan Kaske played the melody from Händel's 'Fireworks Music' on the flute in a rock-meets-classical version. 'Oriental Journey-Hero's Death' creates a psychedelic mood with sitar and mellotron sounds. 'Encyclopedia Terrae', which takes up the entire second side, is regarded as the highlight of the album and features powerful drums meeting up with peaceful sequences, sounds of warfare such as detonating bombs and marching soldiers meeting up with hard guitar riffs. This debut album instantly became a classic in the Krautrock-genre.

== Track listing ==
Side one

1. "Mythoett" – 3:08
2. "Oriental Journey" – 8:16 / "Hero's Death" – 9:47

Side two

1. "Encyclopedia Terra" – 17:31
  1. "Part 1" – 10:17
  2. "Part 2" – 7:24

== Personnel ==
- Thomas Hildebrand – drums, percussion
- Stephan Kaske – drums, flute, guitar, acoustic guitar, electric guitar, keyboards, sitar, synthesizer, vocals
- Harald Weisse – bass, guitar
