= Mythos (band) =

- Origin: Berlin, Germany
- Genres: Krautrock, space rock, psychedelic rock
- Years active: 1969–1980

Mythos was a German band formed in Berlin by vocalist and multi-instrumentalist Stephan Kaske, bassist Harold Weiße and drummer Thomas Hildebrand in 1969. All doing their A level at the same school, the self-taught musicians released their eponymous debut in 1971. Influenced by Pink Floyd, Ash Ra Tempel and Hawkwind the album draws on science fiction and ecological themes particularly noticeable on the closing track "Encyclopedia Terrae". The release saw the band support Family, Colosseum at a festival and Humble Pie at their show in Berlin 1971, however after three years the band split. Kaske then recruited Axel Brauer on drums and Michael Krantz on bass. The band wrote and played live for two years but failed to record and split up. On his own Kaske signed, as Mythos, to Cosmic Chorus, and recorded various TV and film soundtracks before recording DreamLab in 1975. In 1976 Kaske expanded the lineup to include Sven Dohrow on guitars, Eberhard Seidler on bass and Ronnie Schreinzer on drums. The band adopted a heavier sound and released two albums, Strange Guys and Concrete City. Kaske left the band in 1980 in order to concentrate on setting up his own recording studio in Berlin and pursue solo projects, and released the two albums; Quasar and Grand Prix. Dohrow and Schreinzer formed The Twins, changing to a synthpop style and scoring a number of minor hits.

== Personnel ==
- Stephan Kaske - Guitars, sitar, flute, synthesizer, vocals, vocoder
- Harald Weiße - Bass, acoustic guitar, effects
- Thomas Hildebrand - Drums, percussion (later played with Metropolis; † 2021)

== Discography ==
- 1972 – Mythos LP (Ohr OMM)
- 1975 – Dreamlab LP (Kosmische Musik, KM)
- 1978 – Strange Guys LP (Venus)
- 1979 – Concrete City LP (Venus)
- 1980 – Quasar LP (Sky)
- 1981 – Grand Prix LP (Sky)
- 1999 – Wintermezzo CD (Art & Music)
- 2011 – Superkraut: Live at Stagge's Hotel 1976 CD (Sireena Records 2011)
- 1994- sound of silence
- 1998- Le printemps mystique
- 2000- Emerald summer
- 2000- Feuillage
- 2002- The modern electronic kamasutra
- 2004- The dramatic stories edgar poe
- 2006- Mysteria
- 2008- Surround sound offensive
- 2012- Surround sound evolution
- 2015- Jules verne forever
