= Dreamlab (album) =

Studio album by Mythos
- Released: 1975
- Genres: Rock; Krautrock
- Length: 40:44
- Labels: LP Kosmische Musik, CD Spalax, Zyx Musik

Mythos chronology
Mythos (1972)	Dreamlab (1975)	Strange Guys (1978)

Professional ratings
Review scores
Source	Rating
AllMusic	4/5 stars

Dreamlab is an album by the German band Mythos. It was released in 1975 on the Kosmische Musik label and featured a new line-up of the band.

Similar to the works of several other fellow artists on the same label, the album develops a science fiction concept around the story of an extraterrestrial visitor on a journey to Earth. Dreamlab is predominantly made up of peaceful and relaxed music. The metre is often determined by echoes from flutes and guitar riffs backed by expansive Mellotron arrangements. The song "Expeditions" was used as the soundtrack for the film Die Superspinne.

== Track listing ==
All tracks by Stephan Kaske, Robby Luizaga except where noted.

Side one

1. "Dedicated to Wernher von Braun" – 5:53
2. "Message part I" – 2:49
3. "Message part II" (Kaske) – 5:24
4. "Expeditions" – 6:02

Side two

1. "Mythalgia" – 2:12
2. "Dreamlab" – 11:17

"Echophase" – 3:03
"Quite amazed" – 3:10
"Going to meet my lady" – 5:04

1. "Eternity" (Kaske) – 7:07

== Personnel ==
- Stephan Kaske – synthesizer, flute, drums, electric guitar, keyboards, acoustic guitar (12 string), vocals
- Robby Luizaga – bass, acoustic guitar, mellotron
- Hans-Jürgen Pütz – drums (including moog drums), percussion, vibraphone
