= Mythology (band) =

English blues rock band

Background information
- Origin: Carlisle, England
- Genres: Blues rock
- Years active: 1967–1968
- Past members: Neil Marshall; Terry Sims; Frank Kenyon; Mike Gillen; Newcastle Rob; Tony Iommi; Chris Smith; Bill Ward

Mythology were an English blues rock band based in Carlisle that formed in early 1967, out of The Square Chex. The band featured future Black Sabbath founding members Tony Iommi and Bill Ward.

== History ==
The founder members of the band were bassist Neil Marshall (1944–2020), lead singer Mike Gillen, lead guitarist Frank Kenyon (born 1945) and Terry Sims on drums. All had been in The Square Chex formed in 1965 with Gillen on lead vocals, Jimmy Wyllie on bass, Danny Little on drums, Ray 'Smokestack' Parr on lead guitar and Ian 'Mel' Meldrum on drums. Terry Sims replaced Little and Meldrum, Frank Kenyon (ex-The VIP's) replaced Parr and Neil Marshall (ex-The Street) replaced Wyllie in 1967. The band changed their name to Mythology in early 1967. Gillen left in December 1967 after a short tour of Europe and was replaced by a Newcastle singer called Rob. A week later, Kenyon left. In January 1968, former members of The Rest, Tony Iommi (born 1948) and Chris Smith (born 1949), replaced Kenyon and Rob on lead guitar and lead vocals respectively. Bill Ward, also formerly of The Rest, replaced Sims on drums in mid-February 1968. Ward made his debut with the band on 17 February 1968 at the Globe Hotel in Main Street, Cockermouth, Cumberland. On 30 April 1968, the band supported The Move at the 101 Club in Carlisle and on 4 May 1968 they supported Gary Walker and the Rain at the Clockwork Orange in Chester, Cheshire.

Mythology had some regional success but eventually disbanded after an incident where all four members were arrested and fined 15 pounds for possession of cannabis resin on 27 May 1968. Much of their gigging work dried up after this event, and they soon disbanded after the final show at the Queen's Hotel in Silloth on 13 July 1968. This gig was recorded by a local DJ and friend of the band, Keith Jefferson. It is the only surviving recording of Mythology's concerts. There are 9 tracks including Spoonful, Dust My Blues, Steppin Out and Morning Dew.

After the dissolution, Ward and Iommi, along with Ozzy Osbourne and Geezer Butler, founded a new band, the Polka Tulk Blues Band, later called Earth and finally renamed Black Sabbath.

== Discography ==
- 1968: Mythology – Queens Hotel, Silloth U.K. 13 July 1968 – Pre-Black Sabbath starring Tony Iommi on guitar & Bill Ward on drums.
