= Mythicism =

Mythicism,

- mythopoeia
- superstition
- the Christ myth theory

== See also ==
- Mysticism
- Euhemerism
