= Mythus =

Mythus may refer to:

- Mythos, the underlying belief system of a society
- "Mythus", the first and only published setting for the Dangerous Journeys role-playing game, created by Gary Gygax
- The Mythus, an alternative, popular book title for Der Mythus des 20. Jahrhunderts (The Myth of the Twentieth Century) by Nazi author Alfred Rosenberg
- Mythus, Aeon of Enigmata in Honkai: Star Rail
