= 13 (Black Sabbath album) =

Studio album by Black Sabbath
- Released: 7 June 2013
- Recorded: August 2012 – January 2013
- Studios: Shangri-La (Malibu, California); Tone Hall (Lapworth, England)
- Genres: Heavy metal; doom metal
- Length: 53:34
- Labels: Vertigo; Republic
- Producer: Rick Rubin

Black Sabbath chronology
Greatest Hits (2009)	13 (2013)	Live... Gathered in Their Masses (2013)

Singles from 13
- 1. "God Is Dead?" Released: 19 April 2013; 2. "End of the Beginning" Released: 15 May 2013; 3. "Loner" Released: 17 October 2013

13 is the nineteenth and final studio album by the English heavy metal band Black Sabbath. It was released on 7 June 2013 through Republic Records in the US, and Vertigo Records internationally, acting as their first studio album in 18 years (the longest gap between albums during their run) following Forbidden (1995). It was the band's first studio recording with original singer Ozzy Osbourne and bassist Geezer Butler since the live album Reunion (1998), which contained two new studio tracks. It was also the first studio album with Osbourne since Never Say Die! (1978), and with Butler since Cross Purposes (1994).

Black Sabbath's original line-up first began work on a new studio album in 2001 with producer Rick Rubin. The album's development was delayed over a 10-year period, as Osbourne resumed his solo career while the rest of the band members went on to pursue other projects, including GZR and Heaven & Hell. When Black Sabbath announced the end of its hiatus on 11 November 2011, the band announced that they would restart work on a new album with Rubin. In addition to original members Osbourne, Butler and guitarist Tony Iommi, the band was joined at the recording sessions by drummer Brad Wilk, of Rage Against the Machine and Audioslave, following original drummer Bill Ward's decision to not participate in the reunion, due to a contractual dispute.

The singles "God Is Dead?", "End of the Beginning", and "Loner" were released in promotion of the album. 13 received positive reviews from critics; praise was directed at the band's songwriting and performance abilities several decades after their formation, though the album has been cited as a product of the loudness war, having a compromised sound quality as a result of an overly compressed dynamic range. At the 56th Annual Grammy Awards in 2014, the band won the Grammy Award for Best Metal Performance for "God Is Dead?". Commercially, 13 was a number-one album in several countries, including the United Kingdom and United States. It was later certified gold by the British Phonographic Industry (BPI) for selling 100,000 copies in the United Kingdom. The album was also certified platinum in Brazil, Canada, Germany, and Poland.

== Background ==
Black Sabbath released their 18th studio album, Forbidden, in 1995, to mostly negative reviews. The following months left the group at a crossroads. After a series of reunion tours from 1997 to 1999 – mostly with Ozzfest – and a break from touring in 2000, the original line-up began work on a new album with producer Rick Rubin in the spring of 2001. These sessions were halted when Ozzy Osbourne was called away to finish tracks for his eighth solo album Down to Earth, released in October that year. Tony Iommi recalled: "It just came to an end... It's a shame because [the songs] were really good." "It's quite different recording now..." he added. "In [the early] days there was no mobile phone ringing every five seconds. When we first started, we had nothing. We all worked for the same thing. Now everybody has done so many other things. It's great fun and we all have a good chat, but it's just different, trying to put an album together."

"We got very scratchy stuff," Osbourne explained in late 2001. "It never really materialised into much. It may be great, but I haven't heard it since, apart from the one song we were doing live ["Scary Dreams", played on Ozzfest 2001]. We produced our own stuff and then we handed the tapes over to Rick Rubin and that was the last I heard of it. I must confess... it wasn't the same way, anyhow. Geezer wasn't writing the lyrics anymore, I was having real big problems coming up with melody lines and topics to sing about... Tony was still firing off these amazing heavy metal riffs. He just goes, 'Here you go,' and comes out with one better than you've ever heard in your life. You'd think he'd run out of things to play. But, for all that, the chemistry just wasn't there."

After one more reunion tour in mid-2001, where they again headlined Ozzfest, Sabbath went back on hiatus. In March 2002, Osbourne's reality TV show The Osbournes debuted on MTV, and quickly became a worldwide hit. It introduced Osbourne to a broader audience; and, to capitalise, Sanctuary Records (who own Sabbath's back catalogue) released the live album Past Lives, featuring material recorded in the 1970s, including the Live at Last album. The band remained on hiatus until mid-2004, when they returned to headline Ozzfest 2004 and 2005. In November 2005, Black Sabbath were inducted into the UK Music Hall of Fame, and in March 2006, after eleven years of eligibility, the band were inducted into the US Rock and Roll Hall of Fame.

In April 2007, a month before the release of Osbourne's tenth album Black Rain, Rhino Records released Black Sabbath: The Dio Years, a compilation culled from the four Sabbath releases featuring Ronnie James Dio. For the release, Iommi, Geezer Butler, Dio and Vinny Appice reunited to write and record three new songs as Black Sabbath. The Dio Years peaked at No.54 on the Billboard 200, while the single "The Devil Cried" reached No. 37 on the Mainstream Rock Tracks chart. Pleased with the results, Iommi and Dio decided to reunite the Heaven and Hell era line-up for a world tour. Because the line-up of Osbourne, Butler, Iommi and Bill Ward were still officially called Black Sabbath, the new line-up dubbed themselves Heaven & Hell, after the album of the same name. Ward was to participate, but dropped out before the tour began due to musical differences with "a couple of the band members" as well as a "contractual dispute". He was replaced by former drummer Vinny Appice, reuniting the line-up that had featured on Mob Rules and Dehumanizer. Heaven & Hell released one studio album, The Devil You Know, in April 2009. Dio died from stomach cancer on 16 May 2010. Following a tribute concert with former Black Sabbath vocalist Glenn Hughes, Heaven & Hell disbanded.

On 11 November 2011, Sabbath hosted a private announcement ceremony at the Whisky a Go Go in Hollywood, California. Hosted by former Black Flag vocalist Henry Rollins, the event featured all four original Sabbath band members. At the event, Sabbath announced they would be officially reuniting, following months of rumours. The reunion was said to feature an appearance at the 2012 Download Festival, and a newly recorded studio album by Rubin expected to be released in late 2012. When Rollins asked the band why they chose to reunite, Iommi responded, "It's now or never. We get along great. Everything's really good." Butler commented that the new material was the "old Sabbath style and sound." Osbourne said he was "blown away", and, "I don't understand why it's happening. I mean, 45 years down the road and we've got a really great album to put out." On 18 November 2011, Black Sabbath announced that they would be touring Europe in May and June 2012.

== Recording ==
On 9 January 2012, it was announced Iommi had been diagnosed with the early stages of lymphoma, which was not expected to impede the group's activity. Because of his cancer diagnosis, work sessions for 13, which were supposed to take place in Los Angeles, California, were moved to Iommi's home in England. On 2 February 2012, Ward publicly announced that he would not participate in the Black Sabbath reunion unless he was given a "signable contract." The following day, the other group members announced they had "no choice but to continue recording without him," but also said "our door is always open" for Ward to return to the band. In February 2012, the band announced that they would not continue the world tour but would play the Download festival in June 2012. Instead of Black Sabbath, the tour would feature Osbourne and a revolving line-up of guest musicians, billed as "Ozzy and Friends". On 11 April, Lollapalooza founder Perry Farrell announced that Black Sabbath would perform at Lollapalooza 2012. Farrell said this would be Black Sabbath's only American concert in 2012.

On 15 May 2012, Ward posted on his website that "after a final effort to participate in the upcoming Sabbath shows a failure to agree has continued" and that he would not be participating in the reunion shows, but would "remain with an open mind and a position of willingness to negotiate 'signable' terms with Sabbath's representatives in the future." On 18 May 2012, Ward was cropped out of photos on blacksabbath.com. On 19 May 2012, Butler released a statement expressing sadness at Ward's decision. He further unveiled that drummer Tommy Clufetos was rehearsing with them in England.

On 2 June 2012, Osbourne told NME that Black Sabbath had written "about 15 songs so far." He also said that 2013 was a good clue as to what the album would be called. The band returned to the studio to continue work on the album on 20 August 2012. An interview that October confirmed the title of one of the new songs, "God Is Dead?". On 12 January 2013, Black Sabbath announced that the album would be called 13 and was expected to be released in June. It was also announced that drummer Brad Wilk of Rage Against the Machine and Audioslave joined in during the recording sessions to complete the drum tracks for the album. In his autobiography, Osbourne revealed Clufetos was present during the development process but Rubin pressured the band into recording with another drummer. He suggested Ginger Baker before Wilk was brought into the sessions.

In a January 2013 interview at NAMM, which took place at the Anaheim Convention Center in Anaheim, California, Butler stated that 13 was not the final title of the album and it would possibly be changed; however, this turned out not to be the case. The band released a brief documentary on their time in the studio via YouTube in February 2013. In it, the group stated that they felt excited to work with producer Rubin and emphasized their desire for a "raw" sound.

== Artwork and title ==
On 4 April 2013, Black Sabbath unveiled the cover artwork for 13. The artwork was created by Nick Dart and Neil Bowen of Zip Design in London. Zip commissioned sculptor Spencer Jenkins to create an 8-foot-tall "13" from wicker, which was then set on fire in the Buckinghamshire countryside. The flames were visible for miles. The image was shot by photographer Jonathan Knowles. A behind-the-scenes video, also shot by Jonathan Knowles's team, was released by Zip Design, showing the numbers' construction. According to bassist Geezer Butler, the title 13 comes from the record company pressuring the band to write 13 songs but they wanted to stop at 10; however, only eight tracks made the final cut.

== Touring and promotion ==
Prior to the album's release, Black Sabbath embarked on their first tour of Australia (initially kicking off in New Zealand) since 1974 in April and May 2013. They also headlined Ozzfest Japan on 12 May 2013. These dates had been arranged to allow Iommi to return to the UK for lymphoma treatment once every six weeks. From late July to early September 2013, Black Sabbath embarked on their first North American tour in eight years. After that, they toured Latin America in October, followed by Europe in November and December.

The first single, "God Is Dead?", was released to radio on 18 April 2013, and as a digital download and on YouTube on 19 April. Black Sabbath appeared on the season 13 finale of CSI: Crime Scene Investigation, in which they performed another new song, "End of the Beginning". The song also plays during the end credits of the 2013 comedy film This Is the End, although it is not listed on the film's official soundtrack. The album became available for streaming on iTunes on 3 June 2013.

== Release ==
13 was first released on 7 June 2013 in parts of Europe and Australasia. It was then released in the UK on 10 June and in North America the day after. It reached No. 1 on the UK Albums Chart after its first week of sales. It is the band's first album to top the UK chart since Paranoid (1970). With a gap of nearly 43 years, it beat the previous record held by Bob Dylan, who released his first chart topping album, Together Through Life (2009), since New Morning (1970). Osbourne was said to be "in shock" at the album's success, remarking that the band has "never had a record climb the charts so fast" before. In another first for the band, the album also reached No. 1 on the US Billboard 200 charts, selling 155,000 copies in the first week. Osbourne said, "There have been so many amazing highlights in our long career. To finally have our first #1 album in the U.S. is another incredible milestone for Black Sabbath."

In its second week of release, the album fell to No. 5 in the US, selling 46,000, totalling 201,000 copies, and in its third week, 13 sold over 26,000 bringing its total sales to 227,000 copies in the US. As of April 2014, 13 has sold over 360,000 copies in the United States. The album also debuted at No. 1 on the Canadian Albums Chart with 25,000 units sold. As of July 2014, the album has surpassed over 1 million copies sold worldwide.

Aforementioned lead single "God Is Dead?" received a great deal of airplay both in Canada and in the United States. For example, the track hit the No. 26 spot on the Billboard top rock songs chart. The band additionally released a related music video for the single.

== Reception ==
Professional ratings
Aggregate scores
Source	Rating
AnyDecentMusic?	6.8/10
Metacritic	72/100
Review scores
Source	Rating
AllMusic	4.5/5 stars
Consequence of Sound	3.5/5 stars
Drowned in Sound	7/10
Entertainment Weekly	B−
The Guardian	3/5 stars
Metal Hammer	9/10
NME	7/10
Pitchfork	7.0/10
Rolling Stone	3.5/5 stars
Slant Magazine	3/5 stars

13 has received mostly positive reviews. On Metacritic, it has a score of 72 out of 100, based on 32 reviews. Fred Thomas of AllMusic praised 13, calling it "unexpectedly brilliant, apocalyptic, and essential for any die-hard metal fan". Geoff Barton of Metal Hammer observed how the heavy metal genre had developed ever since the band originally started it, and concluded that the classic line-up of the band has proven their relevance in modern-day music.

However, 13 has been criticised for having compromised sound quality, due to an overly compressed dynamic range, during a process called peak limiting, which leads to audible distortion. Jon Hadusek of Consequence of Sound said of the production, "Rubin...deserves disparagement for the way he mixed the audio levels, which are crushed by distortion and compression. Otherwise well-recorded songs are blemished, an affliction all too pervasive in the modern music industry". Ben Ratliff of The New York Times also disliked the album's mastering, saying, "The new Black Sabbath album was produced by Rick Rubin, who some believe to be a prime offender in the recent history of highly compressed and loudly mastered music — a major cause of ear fatigue...13 is mastered loudly, too; Mr. Iommi's guitar tone planes outward, leaving very little space, and the drums stay high and present in the mix. Your ears aren't given room to breathe".

=== Awards and accolades ===
The album's lead single "God Is Dead?" won Black Sabbath their first Grammy Award in 14 years for Best Metal Performance in 2014. In 2013, the album won a Metal Hammer Golden God Award for Best Album and a Classic Rock Roll of Honours Award for Album of the Year. It also won the 2014 Revolver Golden Gods Award for Album of the Year.

== Track listing ==
All tracks are written by Ozzy Osbourne, Tony Iommi, and Geezer Butler.

Standard Edition
No.	Title	Length
1.	"End of the Beginning"	8:05
2.	"God Is Dead?"	8:52
3.	"Loner"	4:59
4.	"Zeitgeist"	4:37
5.	"Age of Reason"	7:01
6.	"Live Forever"	4:46
7.	"Damaged Soul"	7:51
8.	"Dear Father"	7:20
Total length:		53:34

Spotify Bonus Tracks
No.	Title	Length
9.	"Methademic"	5:57
10.	"Peace of Mind"	3:40
11.	"Pariah"	5:34
12.	"Dirty Women" (Live in Australia 2013)	7:21
Total length:		76:06

Saturn Special Exclusive-Edition bonus track
No.	Title	Length
9.	"Naïveté in Black"	3:50
Total length:		57:24

Deluxe Edition Bonus Disc
No.	Title	Length
1.	"Methademic"	5:57
2.	"Peace of Mind"	3:40
3.	"Pariah"	5:34
Total length:		15:11

Best Buy / Saturn Exclusive-Edition Deluxe Bonus Disc
No.	Title	Length
1.	"Methademic"	5:57
2.	"Peace of Mind"	3:40
3.	"Pariah"	5:34
4.	"Naïveté in Black"	3:50
Total length:		19:01

== Personnel ==
Black Sabbath

- Ozzy Osbourne – vocals, harmonica
- Tony Iommi – guitars, keyboards
- Geezer Butler – bass

Guest musician

- Brad Wilk – drums, percussion

Production

- Rick Rubin – production
- Greg Fidelman – engineering
- Mike Exeter – additional engineering
- Dana Nielsen – additional engineering
- Andrew Scheps – mixing
- Stephen Marcussen – mastering
- Stewart Whitmore – mastering

== Charts ==
=== Weekly charts ===
Chart (2013)	Peak position
Australian Albums (ARIA)	4
Austrian Albums (Ö3 Austria)	2
Belgian Albums (Ultratop Flanders)	4
Belgian Albums (Ultratop Wallonia)	6
Canadian Albums (Billboard)	1
Danish Albums (Hitlisten)	1
Dutch Albums (Album Top 100)	10
Estonian Albums (Raadio 2)	4
Finnish Albums (Suomen virallinen lista)	2
French Albums (SNEP)	15
German Albums (Offizielle Top 100)	1
Greek Albums (IFPI)	3
Hungarian Albums (MAHASZ)	2
Irish Albums (IRMA)	5
Italian Albums (FIMI)	6
Japanese Albums (Oricon)	10
New Zealand Albums (RMNZ)	6
Norwegian Albums (VG-lista)	6
Portuguese Albums (AFP)	9
Scottish Albums (Official Charts)	3
Spanish Albums (Promusicae)	4
Swedish Albums (Sverigetopplistan)	12
Swiss Albums (Schweizer Hitparade)	1
UK Albums (Official Charts)	1
UK Rock & Metal Albums (Official Charts)	1
US Billboard 200	1
US Top Hard Rock Albums (Billboard)	1
US Top Rock Albums (Billboard)	1
US Indie Store Album Sales (Billboard)	1

=== Year-end charts ===
Chart (2013)	Position
Austrian Albums (Ö3 Austria)	40
Belgian Albums (Ultratop Flanders)	102
Belgian Albums (Ultratop Wallonia)	109
Canadian Albums (Billboard)	30
Danish Albums (Hitlisten)	41
German Albums (Offizielle Top 100)	18
Hungarian Albums (MAHASZ)	92
Swedish Albums (Sverigetopplistan)	27
Swiss Albums (Schweizer Hitparade)	27
UK Albums (OCC)	79
US Billboard 200	86
US Top Hard Rock Albums (Billboard)	2
US Top Rock Albums (Billboard)	18

== Certifications ==
Region	Certification	Certified units/sales
Austria (IFPI Austria)	Gold	7,500^{*}
Brazil (Pro-Música Brasil)	Platinum	40,000^{*}
Canada (Music Canada)	Platinum	80,000^{^}
Germany (BVMI)	Platinum	200,000^{‡}
Poland (ZPAV)	Platinum	20,000^{*}
United Kingdom (BPI)	Gold	129,399
^{*} Sales figures based on certification alone.^{^} Shipments figures based on certification alone.^{‡} Sales+streaming figures based on certification alone.
