= Black Sabbath Reunion Tour =

2012–14 concert tour by Black Sabbath

- Tour by Black Sabbath
- 2014 tour poster
- Location: Asia; Europe; North America; Oceania; South America
- Associated album: 13
- Start date: 19 May 2012
- End date: 4 July 2014
- Legs: 10
- No. of shows: 84

Black Sabbath concert chronology
- Ozzfest Tour (2005); Black Sabbath Reunion Tour (2012–14); The End Tour (2016–17)

The Reunion Tour was a concert tour by the English heavy metal band Black Sabbath, celebrating the band's 2012 reunion and in support of their album 13, which was the group's first album to feature their original singer Ozzy Osbourne since 1978's Never Say Die! and original bassist Geezer Butler since 1994's Cross Purposes.

== Background ==
On 11 November 2011, at the Whisky a Go Go in Los Angeles the band announced that the original lineup was reforming to tour in 2012 and cut a new album. The band was joined by Rick Rubin, who was set to produce the band's new album, the first to come from the original line up since 1978's Never Say Die!. "It was the obvious choice", explained Osbourne of Rubin as producer. "I've known Rick for many years."

Sabbath's last tour with Ozzy was in 2005, and the original lineup last appeared together when they were inducted into the Rock And Roll Hall Of Fame in 2006. They attempted to cut a new album with Rick Rubin in 2001, but the sessions fell apart and Osbourne turned his attention to his solo career. The second incarnation of the band featuring Ronnie James Dio reunited under the moniker Heaven & Hell in 2006, but split four years later, after Dio died.

The first announced date was set for the Download Festival in England on 10 June 2012, but later the band announced more dates in Europe.

On 9 January 2012, guitarist Tony Iommi was diagnosed with the "early stages of lymphoma", according to a statement sent out by the band's publicist. "His bandmates would like everyone to send positive vibes to the guitarist at this time", the statement says. "Iommi is currently working with doctors to establish the best treatment plan. The 'Iron Man' of Rock and Roll remains upbeat and determined to make a full and successful recovery." The band were forced to withdraw from a headlining slot at 2012's Coachella festival, following Iommi's announcement that he was suffering from the lymphoma form of cancer.

Barely a month had passed until 2 February 2012, when original drummer Bill Ward threatened to quit Black Sabbath, issuing a long statement indicating that he would not participate in the reunion unless he was presented with a "signable contract" that "reflects some dignity and respect toward me as an original member of the band." The following day, the band responded on Facebook: "We were saddened to hear yesterday via Facebook that Bill declined publicly to participate in our current Black Sabbath plans...we have no choice but to continue recording without him although our door is always open... We are still in the UK with Tony. Writing and recording the new album and on a roll... See you at Download!!! – Tony, Ozzy and Geezer" Ward would eventually bow out of playing drums for the group's shows scheduled for 2012 after failing to reach a contract agreement. Butler made it known that Tommy Clufetos, who played on Osbourne‘s solo band and a one-time member of Rob Zombie's touring outfit, would step in for Ward as Sabbath prepared to perform. Clufetos was present during the writing sessions, but when it was time to record producer Rick Rubin pushed them into getting another drummer. While Osbourne accepted, with the band eventually settling on Brad Wilk, he made clear he would only go on tour with Clufetos. Once Wilk called Osbourne asking why he wouldn't be brought along, Osbourne responded "Brad, if you were Tommy and you were there for all the writing, and Rick had wanted you gone, how would you feel?"

Just two weeks later on 17 February 2012, Black Sabbath reshuffled its reunion plans in light of Iommi's battle with lymphoma. The band confirmed that they planned to play only one show on their planned European tour – Download Festival, which took place on 10 June in England and was preceded by a warm-up show in Birmingham on 19 May 2012, and then followed by a headlining slot at the Lollapalooza festival in Chicago, marking the band's only North American show of 2012. To make up for the cancellation of the shows, Osbourne headed out on a 17-date tour as part of Ozzy and Friends, which featured special guests such as Slash, Zakk Wylde and Butler on select dates.

The band's concert at Birmingham's O2 Academy was professionally filmed. On 9 August 2012 Black Sabbath released footage of performance of "Paranoid" from the show. The band's performances in at the Rod Laver Arena in Melbourne on 29 April and 1 May 2013 were professionally recorded and released as a live album and film, Live... Gathered in Their Masses.

After seeing their 2012 tour cut short due to Iommi's battle with lymphoma, Black Sabbath returned to the road in 2013, with the band playing shows in New Zealand, Australia, Japan, North America, South America and Europe. The band also headlined the first ever Ozzfest Japan in Chiba City, along with Slipknot, on 11–12 May 2013. The dates in 2013 and 2014 were arranged so that Iommi could return to the UK for treatment once every six weeks.

== Tour dates ==
List of 2012 concerts
Date	City	Country	Venue
19 May 2012^{[A]}	Birmingham	England	O_{2} Academy
10 June 2012	Leicestershire	England	Download Festival
3 August 2012	Chicago	United States	Lollapalooza

List of 2013 concerts
Date	City	Country	Venue
20 April 2013	Auckland	New Zealand	Vector Arena
22 April 2013	Auckland	New Zealand	Vector Arena
25 April 2013	Brisbane	Australia	Brisbane Entertainment Centre
27 April 2013	Sydney	Australia	Allphones Arena
29 April 2013	Melbourne	Australia	Rod Laver Arena
1 May 2013	Melbourne	Australia	Rod Laver Arena
4 May 2013	Perth	Australia	Perth Arena
7 May 2013	Adelaide	Australia	Adelaide Entertainment Centre
12 May 2013	Chiba	Japan	Makuhari Messe (Ozzfest)
25 July 2013	The Woodlands	United States	Cynthia Woods Mitchell Pavilion
27 July 2013	Austin	United States	Frank Erwin Center
29 July 2013	Tampa	United States	Live Nation Amphitheatre
31 July 2013	West Palm Beach	United States	Cruzan Amphitheatre
2 August 2013	Bristow	United States	Jiffy Lube Live
4 August 2013	Holmdel	United States	PNC Bank Arts Center
6 August 2013	Clarkston	United States	DTE Energy Music Theatre
8 August 2013	Uncasville	United States	Mohegan Sun Arena
10 August 2013	Philadelphia	United States	Wells Fargo Center
12 August 2013	Mansfield	United States	Comcast Center
14 August 2013	Toronto	Canada	Air Canada Centre
16 August 2013	Tinley Park	United States	First Midwest Bank Amphitheatre
18 August 2013	Noblesville	United States	Klipsch Music Center
22 August 2013	Vancouver	Canada	Rogers Arena
24 August 2013	George	United States	The Gorge Amphitheatre
26 August 2013	Mountain View	United States	Shoreline Amphitheatre
28 August 2013	Irvine	United States	Verizon Wireless Amphitheatre
30 August 2013	Phoenix	United States	US Airways Center
1 September 2013	Las Vegas	United States	MGM Grand Garden Arena
3 September 2013	Los Angeles	United States	Los Angeles Memorial Sports Arena
4 October 2013	Santiago	Chile	Estadio Monumental David Arellano
6 October 2013	La Plata	Argentina	Estadio Unico de La Plata
9 October 2013	Porto Alegre	Brazil	Fiergs
11 October 2013	São Paulo	Brazil	Campo de Marte Airport
13 October 2013	Rio de Janeiro	Brazil	Praça da Apoteose
15 October 2013	Belo Horizonte	Brazil	Esplanada do Mineirão
19 October 2013	Bogotá	Colombia	Parque Simón Bolívar
22 October 2013	San José	Costa Rica	Estadio Nacional de Costa Rica
26 October 2013	Mexico City	Mexico	Foro Sol
20 November 2013	Helsinki	Finland	Hartwall Arena
22 November 2013	Stockholm	Sweden	Friends Arena
24 November 2013	Oslo	Norway	Telenor Arena
26 November 2013	Copenhagen	Denmark	Forum Copenhagen
28 November 2013	Amsterdam	Netherlands	Ziggo Dome
30 November 2013	Dortmund	Germany	Westfalenhalle
2 December 2013	Paris	France	Palais Omnisports de Paris-Bercy
4 December 2013	Frankfurt	Germany	Festhalle Frankfurt
7 December 2013	Prague	Czech Republic	O_{2} Arena
10 December 2013	London	England	The O_{2} Arena
12 December 2013	Belfast	Northern Ireland	Odyssey Arena
14 December 2013	Sheffield	England	Motorpoint Arena
16 December 2013	Glasgow	Scotland	The Hydro
18 December 2013	Manchester	England	Manchester Arena
20 December 2013	Birmingham	England	LG Arena
22 December 2013	Birmingham	England	National Indoor Arena

List of 2014 concerts
Date	City	Country	Venue
31 March 2014	Brooklyn	United States	Barclays Center
3 April 2014	Halifax	Canada	Metro Centre
5 April 2014	Quebec City	Canada	Colisée Pepsi
7 April 2014	Montreal	Canada	Bell Centre
9 April 2014	London	Canada	Budweiser Gardens
11 April 2014	Hamilton	Canada	Copps Coliseum
13 April 2014	Ottawa	Canada	Canadian Tire Centre
16 April 2014	Winnipeg	Canada	MTS Centre
18 April 2014	Saskatoon	Canada	Credit Union Centre
20 April 2014	Calgary	Canada	Scotiabank Saddledome
22 April 2014	Edmonton	Canada	Rexall Place
26 April 2014	Los Angeles	United States	Hollywood Bowl
29 May 2014	Abu Dhabi	United Arab Emirates	Yas Island
1 June 2014	Moscow	Russia	Olimpiski
3 June 2014	St. Petersburg	Russia	Ice Palace
6 June 2014	Sölvesborg	Sweden	Sweden Rock Festival
8 June 2014	Berlin	Germany	Wuhlheide
11 June 2014	Łódź	Poland	Arena Łódź
13 June 2014	Munich	Germany	Königsplatz
15 June 2014	Nickelsdorf	Austria	Nova Rock Festival
18 June 2014	Bologna	Italy	Unipol Arena
20 June 2014	Zürich	Switzerland	Hallenstadion
22 June 2014	Clisson	France	Hellfest
25 June 2014	Stuttgart	Germany	Hanns-Martin-Schleyer-Halle
27 June 2014	Essen	Germany	Stadion Essen
29 June 2014	Dessel	Belgium	Graspop Metal Meeting
4 July 2014	London	England	Hyde Park

- A Download Festival warm-up show.

Canceled dates

16 October 2013	Lima, Peru	Estadio Monumental	Event cancelled by promoter for undisclosed reasons.
5 December 2013	Milan, Italy	Fiera Arena	Event cancelled by promoter for logistical reasons.

== Personnel ==
- Ozzy Osbourne – vocals, harmonica
- Tony Iommi – guitar
- Geezer Butler – bass

with

- Adam Wakeman – keyboards, rhythm guitar
- Tommy Clufetos – drums, percussion

== Supporting acts ==
- Svart Crown - German dates only
- Andrew W.K - Select 2013 U.S. Dates
- Shihad - New Zealand & Australian Leg
- Megadeth - Latin American Leg

== Gross ==
2013: 641,928 tickets sold, $53.8 million from 54 shows

2014: 201,038 tickets sold, $18.2 million from 21 shows

Total available gross: 842,966 tickets sold, $72.0 million from 75 shows.
