= Breaking into Heaven =

Breaking into Heaven may refer to:

- "Breaking into Heaven" (Heaven & Hell song)
- "Breaking into Heaven" (The Stone Roses song)
