= End of the Beginning (song) =

Single by Black Sabbath

from the album 13
- Released: 15 May 2013
- Recorded: August 2012 – January 2013
- Studio: Shangri-La (Malibu, California)
- Genre: Doom metal; heavy metal
- Length: 8:07
- Label: Vertigo; Republic
- Songwriters: Geezer Butler; Tony Iommi; Ozzy Osbourne
- Producer: Rick Rubin

Black Sabbath singles chronology
"God Is Dead?" (2013)	"End of the Beginning" (2013)	"Loner" (2013)

Music video
- "End of the Beginning" on YouTube

"End of the Beginning" is a song by the English heavy metal band Black Sabbath, the opening track on their nineteenth studio album, 13 (2013).

== Composition ==
"End of the Beginning" has been described as a doom metal song. According to lyricist Geezer Butler, the song deals with the fear of how "technology is going to completely take over the human race", inspired particularly by cloning: "It seems like eventually, people are going to clone the Beatles and stuff like that. I mean, it’s already happening now with a "Tupac" at Coachella, using holograms. But eventually I think they’ll start cloning people like the Beatles, and sending them out on endless tours." Music Scholar and Black Sabbath fanatic, Nolan Stolz, notes that there are apparent similarities between "End of the Beginning" and "Black Sabbath", the first song off of the first album released by Black Sabbath. It is probable that this was an artistic statement signifying the band getting back to their roots.

== Release ==
"End of the Beginning" was premiered during the finale of season 13 of CSI: Crime Scene Investigation. The band guest starred in the episode, and also appeared in a short interview prior to its release. The song was first performed live on 20 April 2013, on the first of the two Auckland shows in New Zealand. The performance was part of their reunion tour. It was also featured in the end credits of the film This Is the End. On 11 June, coinciding with the album's launch, Black Sabbath released a full performance video from the CSI season 13 finale of length 8:20. The single peaked at the number 38 in US Mainstream Rock chart. "End of the Beginning" was ranked the 21st best Black Sabbath song by Rock - Das Gesamtwerk der größten Rock-Acts im Check.

== Personnel ==
- Ozzy Osbourne – vocals
- Tony Iommi – guitars
- Geezer Butler – bass

Additional musician

- Brad Wilk – drums

== Chart performance ==
Chart performance for "End of the Beginning"
Chart (2013)	Peak position
US Mainstream Rock (Billboard)	38
