= The Rules of Hell =

Box set by Black Sabbath
- Released: 22 July 2008
- Recorded: 1980–1982, 1992
- Genre: Heavy metal
- Length: 3:40:08
- Label: Rhino

Black Sabbath chronology
Live at Hammersmith Odeon (2007)	The Rules of Hell (2008)	Greatest Hits (2009)

Professional ratings
Review scores
Source	Rating
PiercingMetal	5/5 stars
AllMusic	3.5/5 stars

The Rules of Hell is a collection of four albums by the English heavy metal band Black Sabbath featuring Ronnie James Dio on vocals in remastered form. The albums included in the set are:

- 1980 Heaven and Hell
- 1981 Mob Rules
- 1982 Live Evil (2 CDs)
- 1992 Dehumanizer

The boxed set was released on 22 July 2008 through Rhino. Heaven & Hell supported the box set on the Metal Masters Tour, featuring Judas Priest, Motörhead and Testament.

The set does not include the three new recordings from the Black Sabbath: The Dio Years compilation, although some Internet stores included the three The Dio Years tracks as a bonus when downloading the set.

== Best Buy exclusive live bonus disc ==
A version of this box set was sold at Best Buy for a limited time as an exclusive. This edition included an extra CD containing five live tracks from the previously released but very limited and out of print Live at Hammersmith Odeon. The tracks included are:

1. "Neon Knights"
2. "The Mob Rules"
3. "Children of the Grave"
4. "Voodoo"
5. "Country Girl"

The first four of these tracks were also released on the UK "tour edition" of The Dio Years.
