= God Is Dead? =

Single by Black Sabbath

from the album 13
- Released: 19 April 2013
- Recorded: August 2012 – January 2013
- Studio: Shangri-La (Malibu, California)
- Genre: Doom metal
- Length: 8:54
- Label: Vertigo; Republic
- Songwriters: Geezer Butler; Tony Iommi; Ozzy Osbourne
- Producer: Rick Rubin

Black Sabbath singles chronology
| "The Devil Cried" (2007) | "God Is Dead?" (2013) | "End of the Beginning" (2013) |

Music video
- "God Is Dead?" on YouTube

"God Is Dead?" is a song by the English heavy metal band Black Sabbath, the second track on their nineteenth studio album, 13 (2013). It was released as the album's lead single on 19 April 2013, the first Black Sabbath release with Ozzy Osbourne since "Psycho Man" and "Selling My Soul" from Reunion (1998).

== Composition ==
"God Is Dead?" has been described as a doom metal song. Both the song title and figure on the single's cover, by Heather Cassils, are a reference to Friedrich Nietzsche, a German philosopher who is famous for saying that "God is dead. God remains dead. And we have killed him. How shall we comfort ourselves, the murderers of all murderers?". It is one of Black Sabbath's longer original compositions, second to "Megalomania" from their 1975 album, Sabotage.

== Release and reception ==
The song was released via an MP3 download on Amazon and was also available as a free download to those who pre-ordered the full album on iTunes. The song in its entirety was posted on the official YouTube channel in promotion of this. The music video for the song, directed by Peter Joseph, known for the Zeitgeist film series, was released on 10 June 2013. The song was featured in the second promo for the sixth season of Sons of Anarchy, a FX network television series.

"God Is Dead?" reached number 6 on the UK Rock Charts. It was ranked the 14th-best Black Sabbath song by Rock - Das Gesamtwerk der größten Rock-Acts im Check. The song later won the Grammy Award for Best Metal Performance on 26 January 2014, the band's first Grammy Award in 14 years. Also in 2014, the song won a Planet Rock Award for Best British Single.

== Personnel ==
Black Sabbath

- Ozzy Osbourne – vocals
- Tony Iommi – guitars, keyboards
- Geezer Butler – bass guitar

Additional musician

- Brad Wilk – drums

== Chart performance ==
Chart performance for "God Is Dead?"
| Chart (2013) | Peak position |
|---|---|
| Australia (ARIA) | 133 |
| Canada Hot 100 (Billboard) | 79 |
| Canada Rock (Billboard) | 6 |
| Germany (GfK) | 99 |
| UK Singles (OCC) | 139 |
| UK Rock & Metal (Official Charts) | 6 |
| US Hot Rock & Alternative Songs (Billboard) | 26 |
| US Mainstream Rock | 7 |

== Certifications ==
| Region | Certification | Certified units/sales |
|---|---|---|
| Brazil (Pro-Música Brasil) | Gold | 30,000^{‡} |
^{‡} Sales+streaming figures based on certification alone.
