= Neon Nights: 30 Years of Heaven & Hell =

Live album by Heaven & Hell
- Released: November 10, 2010 (Japan); November 16, 2010
- Recorded: July 30, 2009
- Venue: Wacken Open Air (Wacken)
- Genre: Heavy metal
- Length: 74:23
- Label: Eagle Rock Entertainment

Heaven & Hell chronology
| The Devil You Know (2009) | Neon Nights: 30 Years of Heaven & Hell (2010) |

DVD cover
- DVD cover

Professional ratings
Review scores
| Source | Rating |
|---|---|
| AllMusic | 3.5/5 stars |

Neon Nights: 30 Years of Heaven & Hell ("Live in Europe" for the U.S. market and "Live at Wacken" for the European market) is a live album by the British-American heavy metal band Heaven & Hell. Recorded at the Wacken Open Air Festival in Germany on 30 July 2009, it was released in the U.S. on 16 November 2010 and in Japan on October 27, 2010 (Deluxe Website Version) and November 10, 2010 (retail version). It includes songs from the three official Dio-era Black Sabbath albums, as well as songs from The Devil You Know. The album was released in both CD and DVD formats, and the DVD also includes interviews regarding the 30th anniversary of the release of Heaven and Hell and a tribute to Ronnie James Dio, in addition to the concert recording.

== Track listing ==
=== CD track list ===
| No. | Title | Writer(s) | Length |
|---|---|---|---|
| 1. | "The Mob Rules" | Geezer Butler, Ronnie James Dio, Tony Iommi | 3:46 |
| 2. | "Children of the Sea" | Butler, Dio, Iommi, Bill Ward | 6:30 |
| 3. | "I" | Butler, Dio, Iommi | 6:16 |
| 4. | "Bible Black" | Butler, Dio, Iommi | 6:29 |
| 5. | "Time Machine" | Butler, Dio, Iommi | 4:39 |
| 6. | "Fear" | Butler, Dio, Iommi | 4:36 |
| 7. | "Falling Off the Edge of the World" | Butler, Dio, Iommi | 5:39 |
| 8. | "Follow the Tears" | Butler, Dio, Iommi | 6:11 |
| 9. | "Die Young" | Butler, Dio, Iommi, Ward | 6:41 |
| 10. | "Heaven and Hell" | Butler, Dio, Iommi, Ward | 17:48 |
| 11. | "Neon Knights" | Butler, Dio, Iommi, Ward | 5:45 |

=== DVD track list ===
| No. | Title | Length |
|---|---|---|
| 1. | "E5150 (not on the CD)" |
| 2. | "Mob Rules" |
| 3. | "Children of the Sea" |
| 4. | "I" |
| 5. | "Bible Black" |
| 6. | "Time Machine" |
| 7. | "Fear" |
| 8. | "Falling off the Edge of the World" |
| 9. | "Follow the Tears" |
| 10. | "Die Young" |
| 11. | "Heaven and Hell" |
| 12. | "Country Girl (not on the CD)" |
| 13. | "Neon Knights" |

== Personnel ==
- Ronnie James Dio - vocals
- Tony Iommi - guitar
- Geezer Butler - bass
- Vinny Appice - drums
- Scott Warren - keyboards

== Charts ==
| Chart (2010) | Peak position |
|---|---|
| German Albums (Offizielle Top 100) | 59 |
| Japanese Albums (Oricon) | 278 |
| UK Independent Albums (OCC) | 28 |
| UK Rock & Metal Albums (OCC) | 24 |
