= Heaven and Hell 2007 Tour =

2007 concert tour by Heaven & Hell

Heaven & Hell 2007 Tour
- World tour by Heaven & Hell
- Australian tour poster
- Associated album: The Dio Years
- Start date: 11 March 2007
- End date: 18 November 2007
- Legs: 7
- No. of shows: 98

Heaven & Hell concert chronology
- Heaven and Hell 2007 Tour (2007); Metal Masters Tour (2008)

The Heaven and Hell 2007 Tour was a global concert tour by Heaven & Hell in support of Black Sabbath's The Dio Years compilation CD.

== History ==
The idea for a 2007 Heaven & Hell concert tour was brought about when Rhino records informed Tony Iommi's management that they would like to include previously unreleased material for the Dio Years compilation. After it emerged that no suitable material was available, Iommi contacted Dio and suggested they record some new songs together. After the successful recording sessions, the band decided to tour.

== Sample set list ==
The following is the set list from Heaven & Hell's concert at Air Canada Centre in Toronto on 22 March 2007.

1. "E5150"
2. "After All (The Dead)"
3. "The Mob Rules"
4. "Children of the Sea"
5. "Lady Evil"
6. "The Sign of the Southern Cross"
7. "Voodoo"
8. "The Devil Cried"
9. "Computer God"
10. "Falling Off the Edge of the World"
11. "Shadow of the Wind"
12. "Die Young"
13. "Heaven and Hell"
14. "Neon Knights"
- "Ear in the Wall" was played in some gigs.

== Opening acts ==
Heaven & Hell had various support acts. In the US Queensrÿche and Alice Cooper after Rob Zombie - who had been confirmed as a US opener - was replaced by Cooper., though Alice Cooper was not actually an opening act, his Psycho-Drama tour dates were juxtaposed with theirs. Lamb of God and Iced Earth were the supports at UK concerts. Canadian dates were supported by Megadeth and Down. During the Australian tour, the band Down led by ex Pantera lead singer Phil Anselmo were the supporting act. In May, Albany NY, Megadeth opened.

== Tour DVD ==
Live from Radio City Music Hall was recorded on 30 March 2007. The show was the first American show the line-up performed in 15 years.

== Tour dates ==
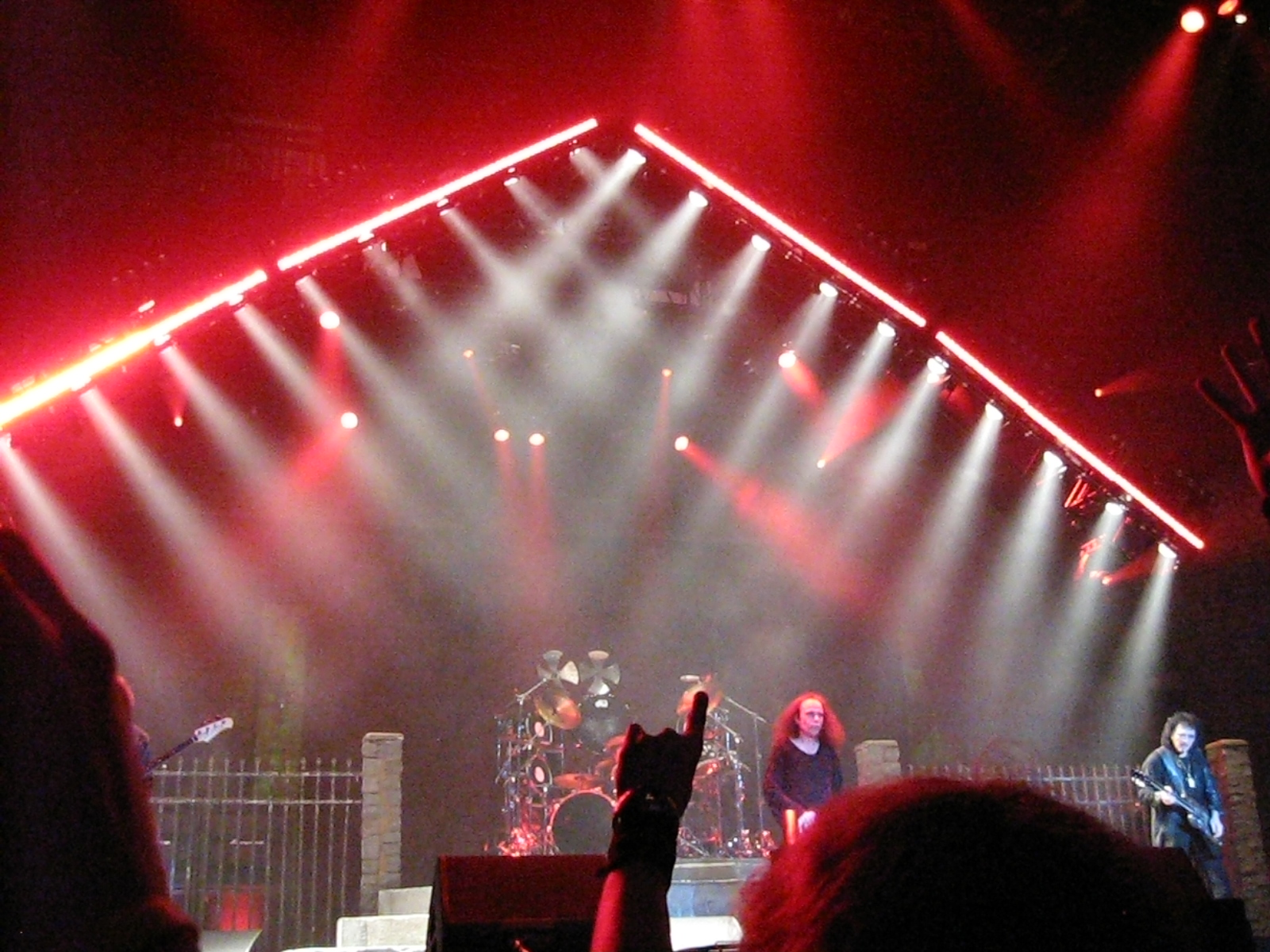
Heaven & Hell at the Birmingham NEC

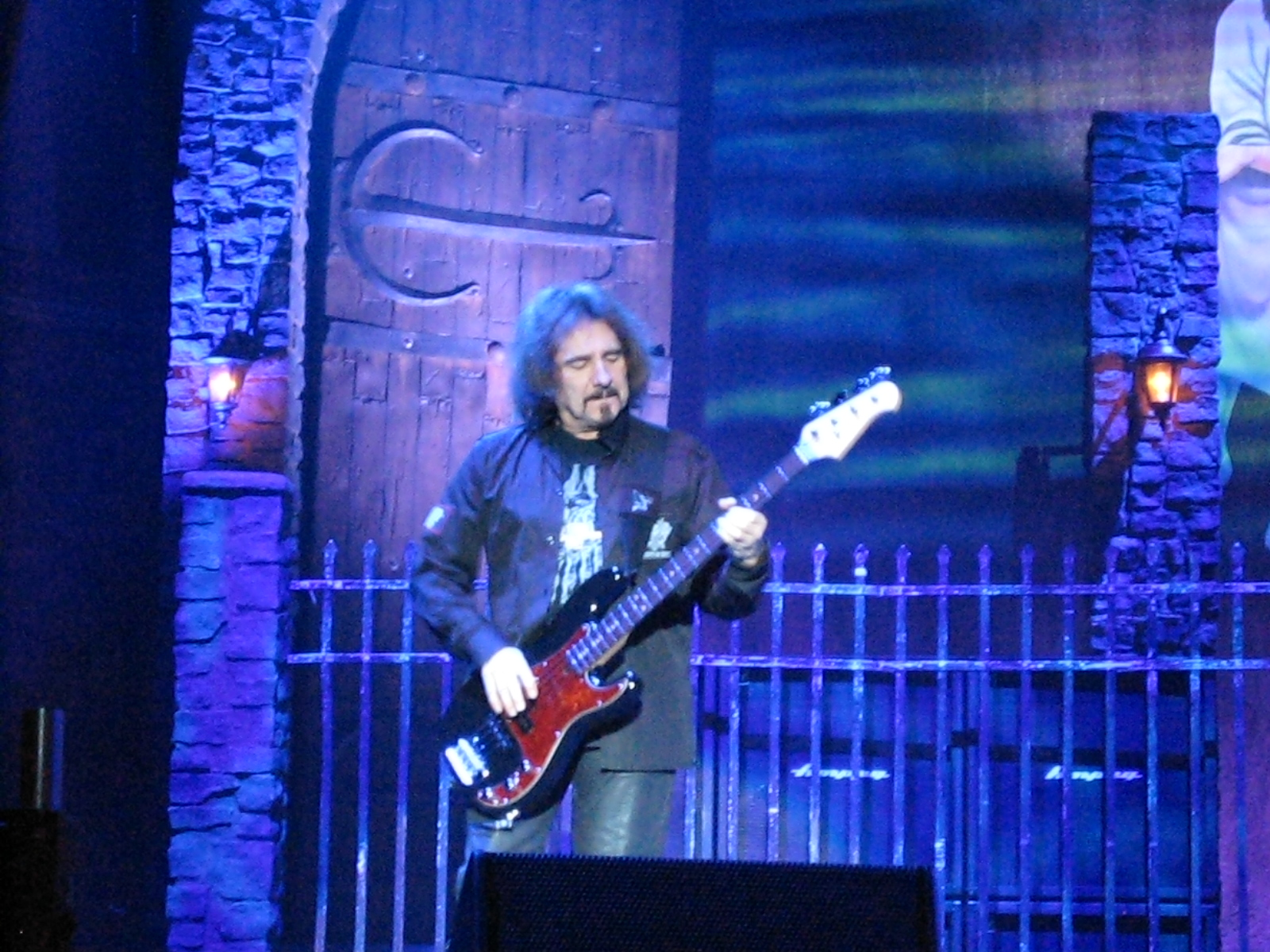
Geezer Butler performing at the Birmingham NEC

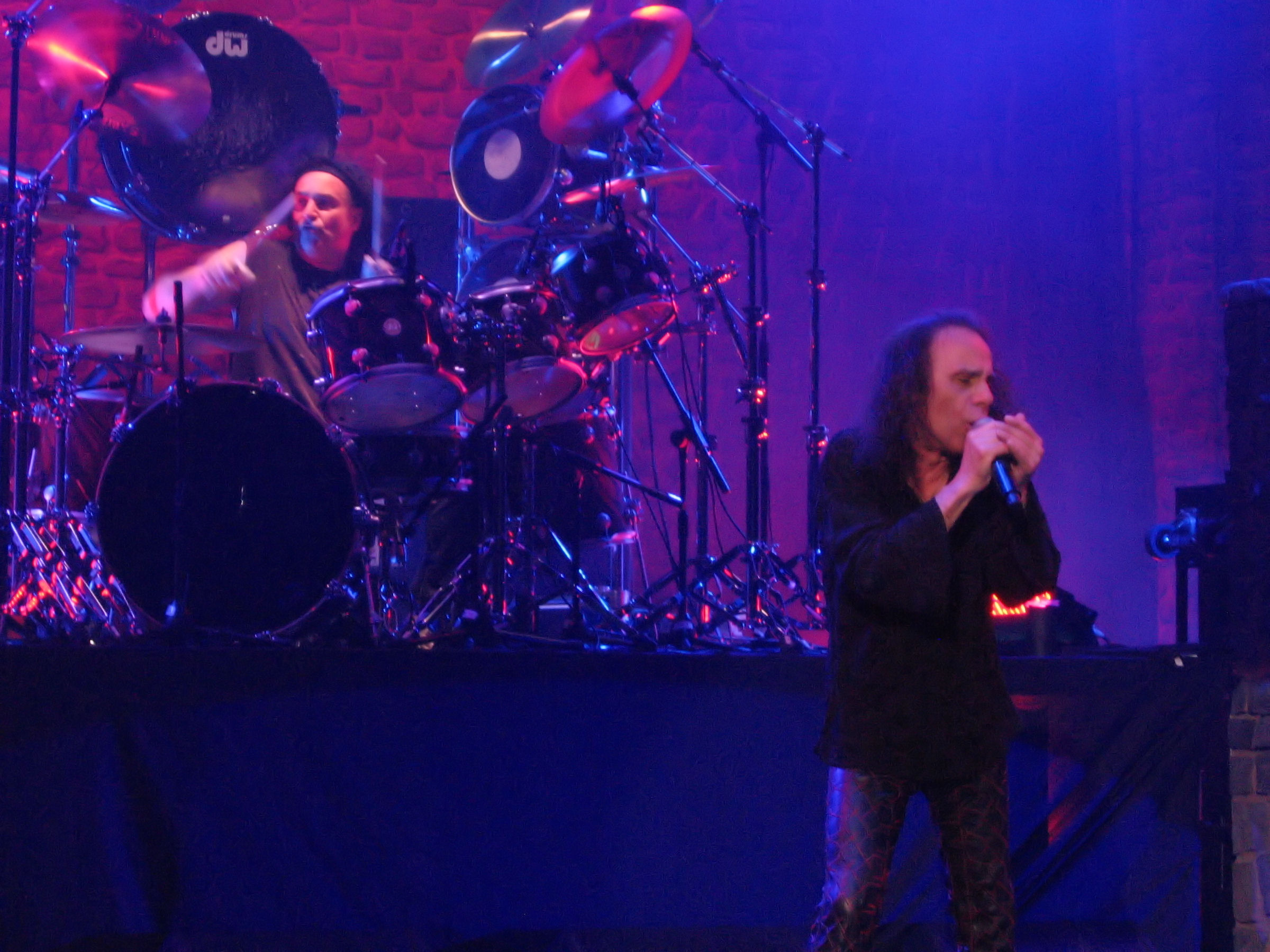
Ronnie James Dio and Vinny Appice performing at Spodek in Poland

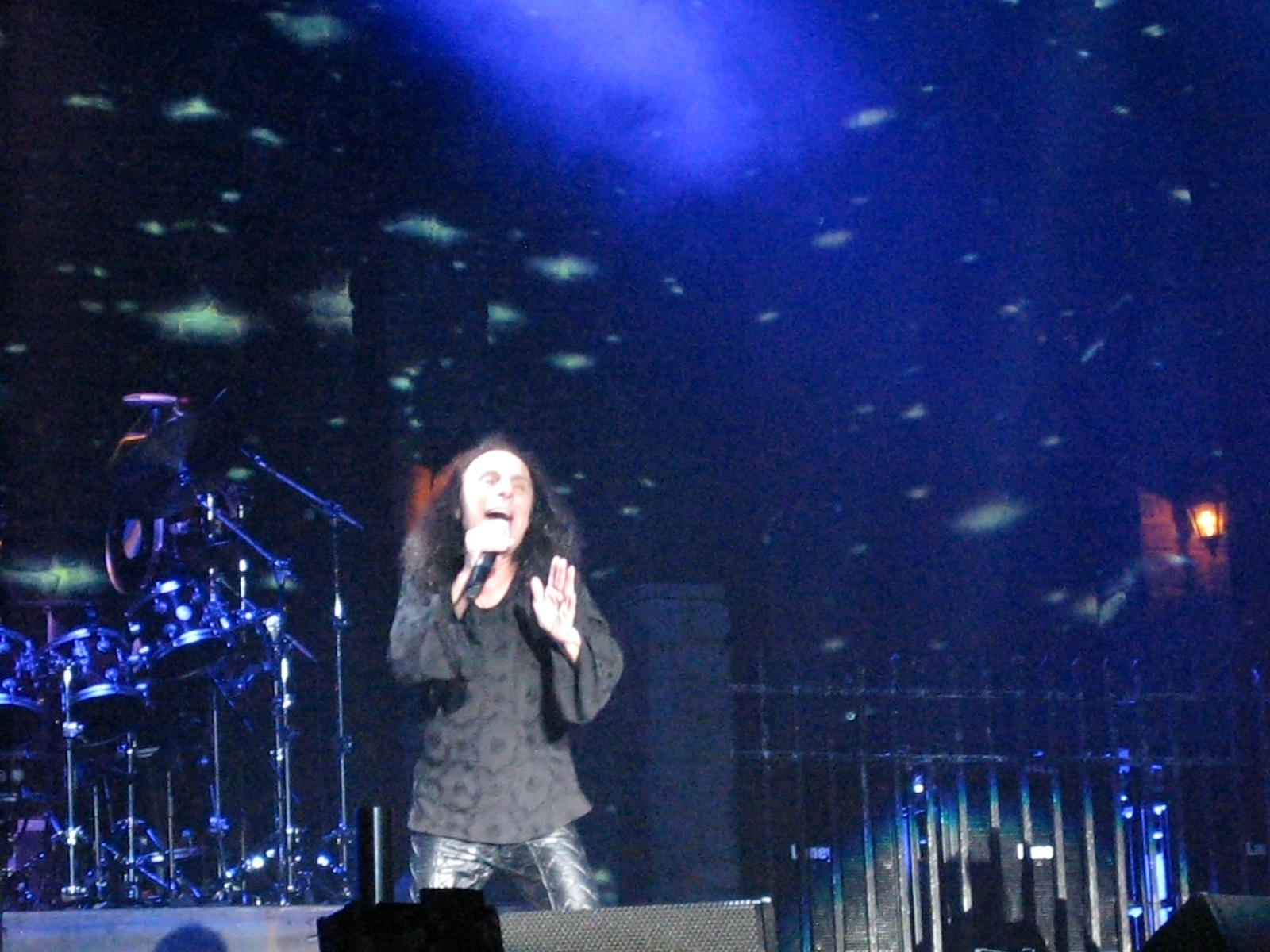
Dio at the NEC

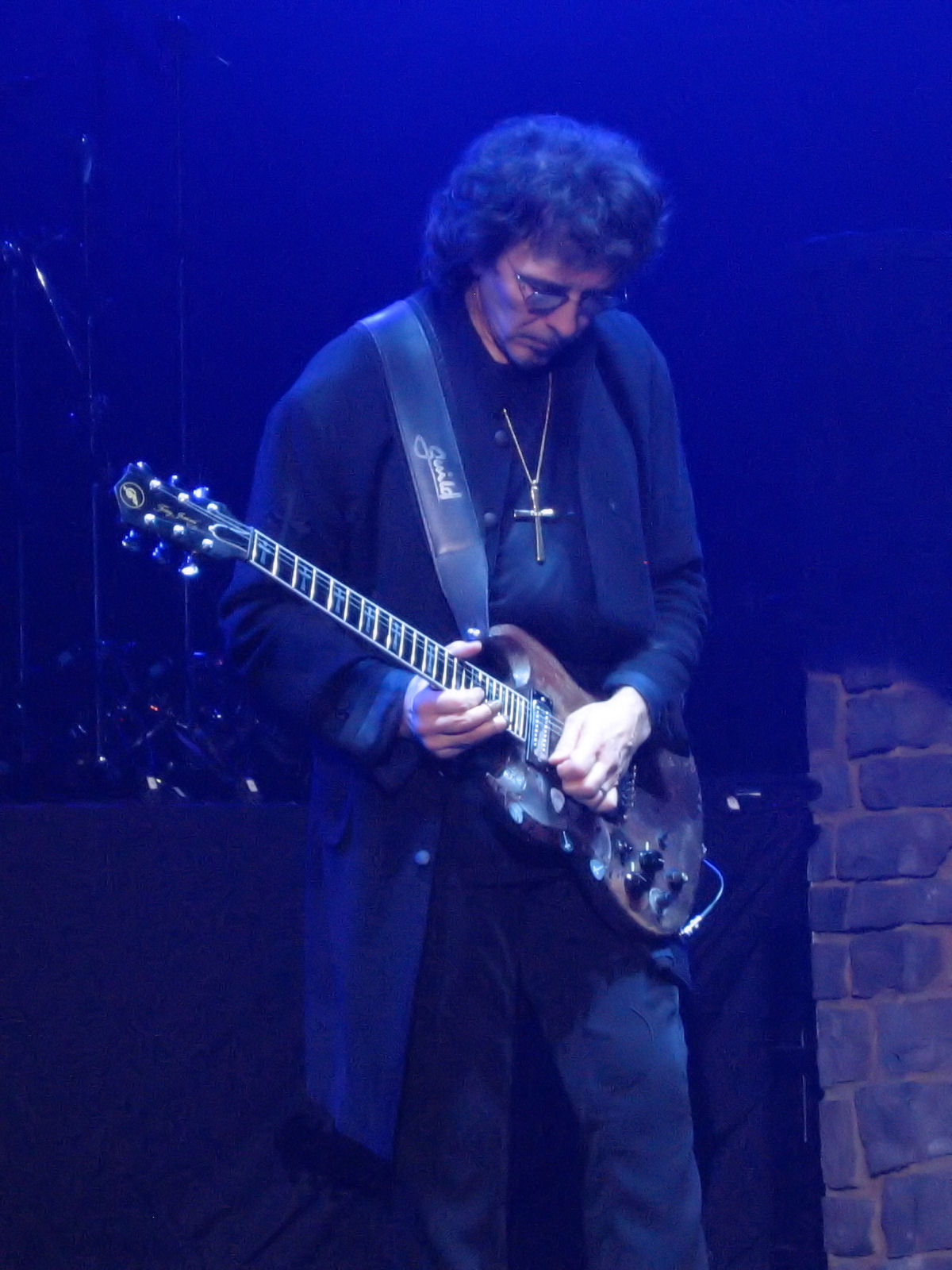
Tony Iommi performing at Spodek in Poland

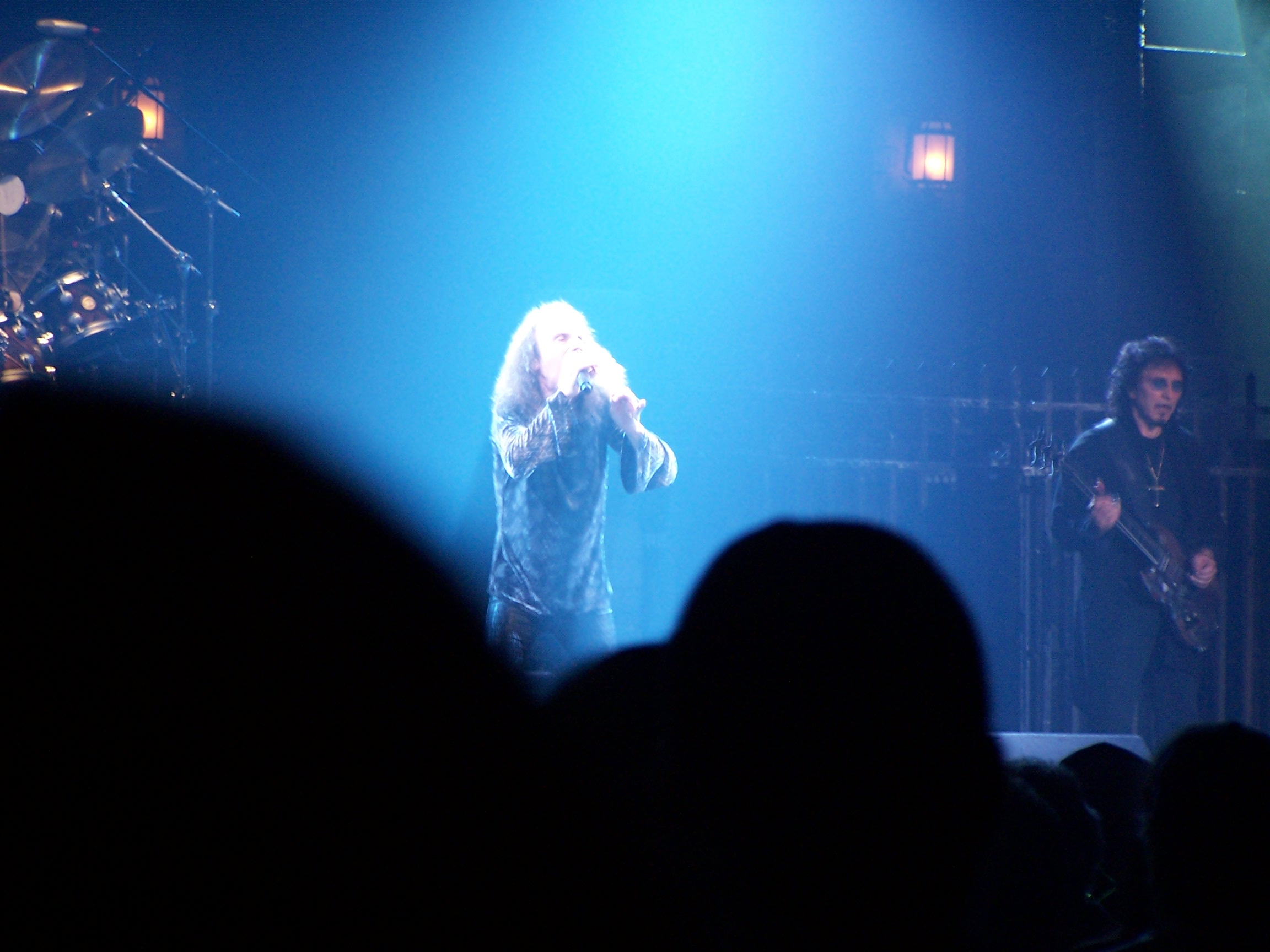
Dio performing in Binghamton, New York

Date	City	Country	Venue	Opening act
11 March 2007	Vancouver	Canada	Pacific Coliseum	*Down; *Megadeth
13 March 2007	Edmonton	Canada	Rexall Place	*Down; *Megadeth
14 March 2007	Calgary	Canada	Saddledome	*Down; *Megadeth
16 March 2007	Regina	Canada	Brandt Centre	*Down; *Megadeth
18 March 2007	Winnipeg	Canada	MTS Centre	*Down; *Megadeth
20 March 2007	Sault Ste. Marie	Canada	Steelback Centre	*Down; *Megadeth
22 March 2007	Toronto	Canada	Air Canada Centre	*Down; *Megadeth
24 March 2007	London	Canada	John Labatt Centre	*Down; *Megadeth
26 March 2007	Montreal	Canada	Bell Centre	*Down; *Megadeth
27 March 2007	Quebec City	Canada	Colisée Pepsi Arena	*Down; *Megadeth
28 March 2007	Ottawa	Canada	Ottawa Civic Centre	*Down; *Megadeth
30 March 2007	New York City	United States	Radio City Music Hall	
22 April 2007	Phoenix	United States	Dodge Theatre	*Megadeth; *Machine Head
24 April 2007	San Jose	United States	HP Pavilion at San Jose	*Megadeth; *Machine Head
25 April 2007	Inglewood	United States	The Forum	*Megadeth; *Machine Head
26 April 2007	Chula Vista	United States	Coors Amphitheatre	*Megadeth; *Machine Head
28 April 2007	Albuquerque	United States	Journal Pavilion	*Megadeth; *Machine Head
29 April 2007	Broomfield	United States	Broomfield Events Center	*Megadeth; *Machine Head
1 May 2007	Selma	United States	Verizon Wireless Amphitheatre	*Megadeth; *Machine Head
2 May 2007	The Woodlands	United States	Cynthia Woods Mitchell Pavilion	*Megadeth; *Machine Head
3 May 2007	Dallas	United States	Nokia Theater	*Megadeth; *Machine Head
5 May 2007	Rosemont	United States	Allstate Arena	*Megadeth; *Machine Head
6 May 2007	Minneapolis	United States	Target Center	*Megadeth; *Machine Head
8 May 2007	Cincinnati	United States	U.S. Bank Arena	*Megadeth; *Machine Head
10 May 2007	Philadelphia	United States	Wachovia Spectrum	*Megadeth; *Machine Head
12 May 2007	Cleveland	United States	Tower City Amphitheater	*Megadeth; *Machine Head
12 May 2007	Detroit	United States	Cobo Hall	*Megadeth; *Machine Head
14 May 2007	Albany	United States	Times Union Center	*Megadeth; *Machine Head
15 May 2007	Uncasville	United States	Mohegan Sun Arena	*Megadeth; *Machine Head
17 May 2007	Lowell	United States	Tsongas Arena	*Megadeth; *Machine Head
18 May 2007	Columbia	United States	Merriweather Post Pavilion	*Megadeth; *Machine Head
19 May 2007	Holmdel Township	United States	PNC Bank Arts Center	*Megadeth; *Machine Head
2 June 2007	Winterthur	Switzerland	Eulachhalle	
3 June 2007	Milan	Italy	Idropark	
6 June 2007	Copenhagen	Denmark	K.B. Hallen	
7 June 2007	Sölvesborg	Sweden	Sweden Rock Festival	
9 June 2007	Tampere	Finland	Sauna Open Air Metal Festival	
10 June 2007	Helsinki	Finland	Helsinki Ice Hall	
16 June 2007	Biddinghuizen	Netherlands	Evenemententerrein	
17 June 2007	Offenbach am Main	Germany	Stadthalle	
19 June 2007	Warsaw	Poland	Torwar	
20 June 2007	Katowice	Poland	Spodek	
22 June 2007	Balingen	Germany	Messegelände	
23 June 2007	Dessel	Belgium	Boeretang	
25 June 2007	Prague	Czech Republic	T-Mobile Arena	
26 June 2007	Košice	Slovakia	Steel Aréna	
28 June 2007	Kavarna	Bulgaria	Kaliakra Stadium	
1 July 2007	Athens	Greece	Terra Vibe Park	
4 July 2007	Budapest	Hungary	Petofi Hall	
5 July 2007	Vienna	Austria	Rotundenplatz	
7 July 2007	Montreux	Switzerland	Stravinski Hall	
2 August 2007	Perth	Australia	Challenge Stadium	*Down
5 August 2007	Adelaide	Australia	Thebarton Theatre	*Down
7 August 2007	Wollongong	Australia	WIN Entertainment Centre	*Down
8 August 2007	Newcastle	Australia	Newcastle Entertainment Centre	*Down
10 August 2007	Melbourne	Australia	Rod Laver Arena	*Down
11 August 2007	Sydney	Australia	Sydney Entertainment Centre	*Down
14 August 2007	Brisbane	Australia	Brisbane Entertainment Centre	*Down
16 August 2007	Auckland	New Zealand	Logan Campbell Centre	*Down
30 August 2007	Mexico City	Mexico	Auditorio Nacional	
31 August 2007	Guadalajara	Mexico	Arena VFG	
1 September 2007	Monterrey	Mexico	Arena Monterrey	
5 September 2007	Binghamton	United States	Broome County Arena	*Alice Cooper; *Queensrÿche
7 September 2007	Uncasville	United States	Mohegan Sun Arena	*Alice Cooper; *Queensrÿche
8 September 2007	Wantagh	United States	Jones Beach Amphitheatre	*Alice Cooper; *Queensrÿche
9 September 2007	Mansfield	United States	Tweeter Center	*Alice Cooper; *Queensrÿche
11 September 2007	Reading	United States	Sovereign Center	*Alice Cooper; *Queensrÿche
14 September 2007	Tampa	United States	St. Pete Times Forum	*Alice Cooper; *Queensrÿche
15 September 2007	Sunrise	United States	BankAtlantic Center	*Alice Cooper; *Queensrÿche
16 September 2007	Orlando	United States	Amway Arena	*Alice Cooper; *Queensrÿche
19 September 2007	Corfu	United States	Darien Lake Performing Arts Center	*Alice Cooper; *Queensrÿche
20 September 2007	Hamilton	Canada	Copps Coliseum	*Alice Cooper; *Queensrÿche
22 September 2007	Hoffman Estates	United States	Sears Centre	*Alice Cooper; *Queensrÿche
23 September 2007	St. Charles	United States	Family Arena	*Alice Cooper; *Queensrÿche
25 September 2007	Greenwood Village	United States	Coors Amphitheatre	*Alice Cooper; *Queensrÿche
28 September 2007	Reno	United States	Reno Events Center	*Alice Cooper; *Queensrÿche
29 September 2007	Kelseyville	United States	Konocti Harbor	*Alice Cooper; *Queensrÿche
30 September 2007	Concord	United States	Sleep Train Pavilion	*Alice Cooper; *Queensrÿche
2 October 2007	Fresno	United States	Selland Arena	*Alice Cooper; *Queensrÿche
4 October 2007	Tucson	United States	Anselmo Valencia Amphitheatre	*Alice Cooper; *Queensrÿche
5 October 2007	Paradise	United States	Pearl Concert Theater	*Alice Cooper; *Queensrÿche
6 October 2007	Irvine	United States	Verizon Wireless Amphitheatre	*Alice Cooper; *Queensrÿche
20 October 2007	Tokyo	Japan	Loud Park Festival	
22 October 2007	Tokyo	Japan	Forum	
23 October 2007	Osaka	Japan	Jo Hall	
25 October 2007	Nagoya	Japan	Civic Auditorium	
27 October 2007	Singapore	Singapore	Fort Canning Park	
4 November 2007	Newcastle upon Tyne	United Kingdom	Metro Arena	*Iced Earth; *Lamb of God
6 November 2007	Glasgow	United Kingdom	SECC	*Iced Earth; *Lamb of God
7 November 2007	Sheffield	United Kingdom	Hallam FM Arena	*Iced Earth; *Lamb of God
9 November 2007	Manchester	United Kingdom	Evening News Arena	*Iced Earth; *Lamb of God
10 November 2007	London	United Kingdom	Wembley Arena	*Iced Earth; *Lamb of God
11 November 2007	Brighton	United Kingdom	The Brighton Centre	*Iced Earth; *Lamb of God
13 November 2007	Birmingham	United Kingdom	NEC	*Iced Earth; *Lamb of God
14 November 2007	Cardiff	United Kingdom	International Arena	*Iced Earth; *Lamb of God
15 November 2007	Nottingham	United Kingdom	Nottingham Arena	*Iced Earth; *Lamb of God
17 November 2007	Plymouth	United Kingdom	Plymouth Pavilions	*Iced Earth; *Lamb of God
18 November 2007	Bournemouth	United Kingdom	Bournemouth International Centre	*Iced Earth; *Lamb of God
