= The Devil You Know (Heaven & Hell album) =

Studio album by Heaven & Hell
- Released: 24 April 2009
- Recorded: November 2008
- Studio: Rockfield Studios (Wye Valley, Wales)
- Genre: Heavy metal
- Length: 54:01
- Label: Rhino, Roadrunner (Europe)
- Producer: Ronnie James Dio; Tony Iommi; Geezer Butler; Additional production by Mike Exeter

Heaven & Hell chronology
Live from Radio City Music Hall (2007)	The Devil You Know (2009)	Neon Nights: 30 Years of Heaven & Hell (2010)

Ronnie James Dio chronology
Live from Radio City Music Hall (2007)	The Devil You Know (2009)	Dio at Donington UK: Live 1983 & 1987 (2010)

Alternative Cover

The Devil You Know is the only studio album by the British-American heavy metal band Heaven & Hell, and the third and final album to feature the lineup of Tony Iommi (guitar), Geezer Butler (bass), Ronnie James Dio (vocals), and Vinny Appice (drums), who had recorded Black Sabbath's albums Mob Rules (1981) and Dehumanizer (1992). It was also Dio's final studio album before his death in May 2010.

The album's US import was released in Japan on 24 April 2009, four days earlier than its original due date of 28 April. The Japan domestic pressing which is a SHM-CD (Super High Material CD) was released on 27 April. It was produced by the band and sound engineer Mike Exeter.

The Devil You Know debuted at No. 8 on the Billboard 200 chart upon release, with 30,000 copies sold. It was awarded Best Album at the 2010 Metal Hammer Golden Gods Awards.

In 2025, Graham Hartmann of Metal Injection included the album in his list of "10 Extremely Underrated Metal Albums From The 2000s".

== Conception ==
In 2007 the Ronnie James Dio-era Black Sabbath line-up recorded three new tracks, "The Devil Cried", "Shadow of the Wind", and "Ear in the Wall" for an upcoming greatest hits package entitled Black Sabbath: The Dio Years. Guitarist Tony Iommi said that the tracks were created because he felt there was nothing worth releasing in the vaults from the Dio-era studio recordings and so these new songs were written and recorded. The song "The Devil Cried" was released as a promotional single for the release. Initially Dio commented that after the recording of those songs, he expected to leave the band and return to Dio and that another "Sabbath album" was "the last thing on my mind". Iommi commented that Heaven & Hell agreed on an album whilst the band was in Japan on their 2007 tour. The band started work on the album before and after the Metal Masters Tour in Dio and Iommi's houses respectively. Each member submitted CDs of material for the project. Iommi described the work as "really good, pretty powerful".

== Title and art ==
The album artwork is adapted from a painting by Per Øyvind Haagensen entitled Satan. The artwork features the numbers 25 and 41. Geezer Butler stated in an interview that the numbers refer to the Bible verse Matthew 25:41, which deals with the Last Judgment where "those who sit at the left side of God are cast down into Hell". He also has explained that the name of the album is a reference to the name of the band, as fans know them as Black Sabbath. Dio also stated that he and Geezer Butler had the idea of calling the album "Villa Yankees" after their favourite sports teams (Butler; Aston Villa and Dio; New York Yankees).

When finalising the cover art, the band narrowed it down to their two favourites but had a difficult time making a final decision. The second of those two favourites prominently features the traditional Black Sabbath devil logo. That alternative cover is available exclusively at Wal-Mart within the United States.

== Critical reception ==
Professional ratings
Aggregate scores
Source	Rating
Metacritic	63/100
Review scores
Source	Rating
AllMusic	4/5 stars
Blabbermouth.net	8.5/10
Sputnikmusic	4/5 stars
IGN	7.9/10
Metal Hammer	9/10

The Devil You Know has received generally positive reviews. The album currently holds a score of 63/100 at the aggregate review site, Metacritic, indicating mixed or positive reviews. Phil Freeman of AllMusic described the album as being like Black Sabbath's Paranoid in catching a band at the peak of its powers. However, Freeman went on to note that Heaven & Hell expresses a "very different side of their musical personalities" than Black Sabbath, and that the differing band name is suitable given the overall darker sound. Metal Hammer described the album as "one of the heavy releases of the year" and honored it with a 2010 Golden Gods Award for Best Album. Martin Popoff rated the album as better than Dehumanizer, but not as good as Heaven and Hell or Mob Rules. He described Dio's vocals being delivered with "thespian enunciation" and "passion".

== Touring ==
Heaven & Hell embarked on a second international tour (after their 2007 tour) in support of The Devil You Know. The band's first scheduled date was in Bogotá on 5 May 2009. They were supported by progressive rock acts Coheed and Cambria and The Mars Volta on North America for a select number of shows in August 2009.

== Track listing ==
All tracks are written by Ronnie James Dio, Tony Iommi, and Geezer Butler, except where noted.

No.	Title	Length
1.	"Atom and Evil"	5:15
2.	"Fear"	4:48
3.	"Bible Black"	6:29
4.	"Double the Pain"	5:25
5.	"Rock and Roll Angel"	6:02
6.	"The Turn of the Screw"	5:02
7.	"Eating the Cannibals"	3:37
8.	"Follow the Tears"	6:12
9.	"Neverwhere"	4:35
10.	"Breaking into Heaven"	6:53
Total length:		54:01

iTunes exclusive bonus tracks
No.	Title	Length
11.	"I" (live)	6:30
12.	"Die Young" (Live) (Dio, Iommi, Butler, Bill Ward)	6:46
Total length:		67:17

== Personnel ==
Heaven & Hell

- Ronnie James Dio – vocals, production
- Tony Iommi – guitar, production
- Geezer Butler – bass guitar, production
- Vinny Appice – drums

Additional Personnel

- Mike Exeter – keyboards, additional production, engineering

Production

- Recorded by Mike Exeter
- Mixing and additional recording by Wyn Davis, assisted by Mike Sutherland and Adam Arnold
- Mastered by Stephen Marcussen
- Art direction and design by Masaki Koike
- Cover illustration by Per Øyvind Haagensen
- Photograph by Chapman Baehler
- Etchings by Johann Koch

== Charts ==
Chart (2009)	Peak position
Australian Albums (ARIA Charts)	76
Austrian Albums (Ö3 Austria)	37
Belgian Albums (Ultratop Flanders)	84
Canadian Albums (Billboard)	24
Danish Albums (Hitlisten)	26
Dutch Albums (Album Top 100)	38
Finnish Albums (Suomen virallinen lista)	5
French Albums (SNEP)	53
German Albums (Offizielle Top 100)	17
Hungarian Albums (MAHASZ)	14
Italian Albums (FIMI)	45
Japanese Albums (Oricon)	28
Norwegian Albums (VG-lista)	15
Polish Albums (ZPAV)	20
Scottish Albums (OCC)	20
Spanish Albums (Promusicae)	95
Swedish Albums (Sverigetopplistan)	8
Swiss Albums (Schweizer Hitparade)	31
UK Albums (OCC)	21
UK Rock & Metal Albums (OCC)	1
US Billboard 200	8
US Top Hard Rock Albums (Billboard)	1
US Top Rock Albums (Billboard)	3
US Indie Store Album Sales (Billboard)	2
