= Live from Radio City Music Hall (Heaven & Hell album) =

Live album by Heaven & Hell
- Released: 28 August 2007
- Recorded: 30 March 2007
- Venues: Radio City Music Hall, New York
- Genre: Heavy metal
- Length: 115:57
- Label: Rhino
- Producers: Barry Ehrmann; Gloria Butler; Wendy Dio; Ralph Baker

Heaven & Hell chronology
Live from Radio City Music Hall (2007)	The Devil You Know (2009)

Ronnie James Dio chronology
Black Sabbath: The Dio Years (2007)	Live from Radio City Music Hall (2007)	The Devil You Know (2009)

DVD cover

Deluxe edition

Professional ratings
Review scores
Source	Rating
Allmusic	4/5 stars

Live from Radio City Music Hall is a double album by the British-American heavy metal group Heaven & Hell which was released in 2007. The set is a chronicle of the group's performance on 30 March 2007 at Radio City Music Hall in New York City.

Live from Radio City Music Hall is also available as a DVD. The DVD was certified gold by the RIAA on 5 October 2007 selling 50,000 units. It was released on Blu-ray Disc in 2011.

== Track listing ==
All songs written by Ronnie James Dio, Tony Iommi, Geezer Butler and Bill Ward except where noted.

Disc one
No.	Title	Length
1.	"E5150 / After All (The Dead)" (Dio, Iommi, Butler)	8:30
2.	"The Mob Rules" (Dio, Iommi, Butler)	4:04
3.	"Children of the Sea"	6:52
4.	"Lady Evil"	5:20
5.	"I" (Dio, Iommi, Butler)	6:27
6.	"The Sign of the Southern Cross" (Dio, Iommi, Butler)	9:06
7.	"Voodoo" (Dio, Iommi, Butler)	7:42
8.	"The Devil Cried" (Dio, Iommi)	11:40

Disc two
No.	Title	Length
1.	"Computer God" (Dio, Iommi, Butler)	6:41
2.	"Falling Off the Edge of the World" (Dio, Iommi, Butler)	5:45
3.	"Shadow of the Wind" (Dio, Iommi)	6:05
4.	"Die Young"	7:44
5.	"Heaven and Hell"	15:15
6.	"Lonely Is the Word"	6:48
7.	"Neon Knights"	7:58

The special 3-disc set for the US contains a DVD, tour program, backstage laminate, glossy photos of the band and other tour items available only through the Rhino Records website.

== Personnel ==
- Ronnie James Dio – vocals
- Tony Iommi – guitars
- Geezer Butler – bass
- Vinny Appice – drums
- Scott Warren – keyboards

Production

- Producer – Barry Ehrmann
- Director – Milton Lage
- Project Assistants – Kris Ahrend, Dutch Cramblitt, Jason Elzy, Rich Mahan, Steve Woolard
- Engineering – Kooster McAllister, Paul Shatraw, Paul Special
- Mixing – Wyn Davis, Mike Sutherland

== Release dates ==
- 24 August 2007 in Germany by SPV Records
- 27 August 2007 in the rest of Europe by SPV Records
- 28 August 2007 in the US by Rhino Records

== Charts ==
Chart (2007)	Peak position
German Albums (Offizielle Top 100)	18
Japanese Albums (Oricon)	90
Swiss Albums (Schweizer Hitparade)	77
UK Rock & Metal Albums (Official Charts)	22
US Billboard 200	99

== Certifications ==
Certifications for Live from Radio City Music Hall DVD
Region	Certification	Certified units/sales
United States (RIAA)	Gold	50,000^{^}
^{^} Shipments figures based on certification alone.
