= Live at Hammersmith Odeon =

Live album by Black Sabbath
- Released: 1 May 2007
- Recorded: 31 December 1981 – 2 January 1982
- Venue: Hammersmith Odeon (London)
- Genre: Heavy metal
- Length: 1:19:41
- Label: Rhino Handmade
- Producer: Black Sabbath

Black Sabbath chronology
Black Sabbath: The Dio Years (2007)	Live at Hammersmith Odeon (2007)	The Rules of Hell (2008)

Live at Hammersmith Odeon is a live album by the English heavy metal band Black Sabbath recorded at three concerts between 31 December 1981 and 2 January 1982, during the Mob Rules tour. It was released by Rhino Handmade on 1 May 2007 in a limited edition of 5000, which sold out immediately.

The songs "Country Girl" and "Slipping Away" made their debut on an official live release.

The CD was released only as a digipak, featuring a mini reproduction of a tour programme. Although a UK tour programme for the Mob Rules dates was produced, the one included with this release was for the January 1981 UK dates, which were part of the Heaven and Hell tour. The cover photo is also from the earlier tour.

The 2010 two-disc deluxe edition of Mob Rules included Live at Hammersmith Odeon on its second disc.

Professional ratings
Review scores
Source	Rating
AllMusic	4/5 stars

== Track listing ==
No.	Title	Writer(s)	Recording date	Length
1.	"E5150"	Ronnie James Dio, Tony Iommi, Geezer Butler	2 January 1982	1:18
2.	"Neon Knights"	Dio, Iommi, Butler, Bill Ward	2 January 1982	4:37
3.	"N.I.B."	Ozzy Osbourne, Iommi, Butler, Ward	1 January 1982	5:16
4.	"Children of the Sea"	Dio, Iommi, Butler, Ward	1 January 1982	6:07
5.	"Country Girl"	Dio, Iommi, Butler	1 January 1982	3:53
6.	"Black Sabbath"	Osbourne, Iommi, Butler, Ward	31 December 1981	8:24
7.	"War Pigs"	Osbourne, Iommi, Butler, Ward	1 January 1982	7:40
8.	"Slipping Away"	Dio, Iommi, Butler	31 December 1981	3:18
9.	"Iron Man"	Osbourne, Iommi, Butler, Ward	1 January 1982	7:04
10.	"The Mob Rules"	Dio, Iommi, Butler	31 December 1981	3:35
11.	"Heaven and Hell"	Dio, Iommi, Butler, Ward	1 January 1982	14:24
12.	"Paranoid"	Osbourne, Iommi, Butler, Ward	31 December 1981	3:21
13.	"Voodoo"	Dio, Iommi, Butler	2 January 1982	5:45
14.	"Children of the Grave"	Osbourne, Iommi, Butler, Ward	31 December 1981	5:05

== Personnel ==
- Ronnie James Dio – vocals
- Tony Iommi – guitar
- Geezer Butler – bass
- Vinnie Appice – drums
