= Heaven & Hell (band) =

British-American heavy metal band (2006–2010)

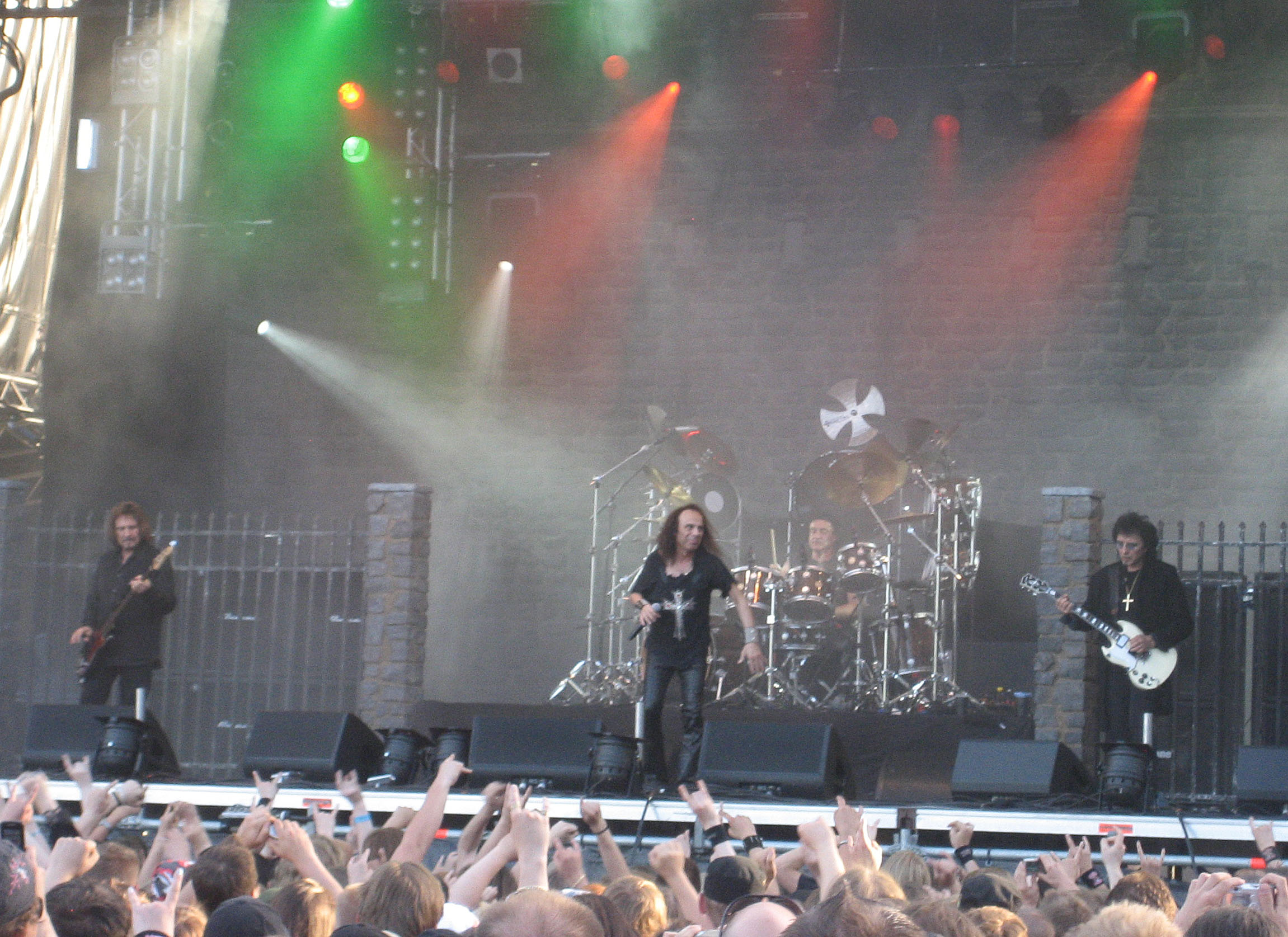
- Heaven & Hell at Sauna Open Air Metal Festival 2007

Background information
- Origin: Los Angeles, California, U.S.
- Genre: Heavy metal
- Years active: 2006–2010
- Labels: Rhino; SPV; Roadrunner; BMG
- Spinoff of: Black Sabbath
- Past members: Tony Iommi; Geezer Butler; Ronnie James Dio; Vinny Appice; Bill Ward

Heaven & Hell was a British-American heavy metal supergroup active from 2006 to 2010, with guitarist Tony Iommi, bassist Geezer Butler, vocalist Ronnie James Dio and drummer Vinny Appice, the lineup that recorded the Black Sabbath albums Mob Rules (1981) and Dehumanizer (1992). The name of the group is derived from the 1980 album Heaven and Hell, the first Black Sabbath album with Dio as a singer.

After Black Sabbath reunited with Dio to record three new songs for the 2007 compilation album, Black Sabbath: The Dio Years, they embarked on a 2007–2008 tour under the Heaven & Hell name. According to Iommi, this name change was made to avoid confusion between the Ozzy Osbourne and Dio fronted line-ups of Black Sabbath (the former of which had been reunited since 1997), so that fans at concerts "would not expect to hear 'Iron Man' and 'War Pigs' and all that... it's none of the old stuff, it's none of the Ozzy period. It's all Dio stuff. So by calling ourselves Heaven & Hell, it's revisiting that period."

The group released one new studio album in 2009, and disbanded following Dio's death from stomach cancer in 2010.

== History ==
=== Formation and early days (2005–2006) ===
In an October 2005 interview with the programme "Masters of Rock", aired on BBC Radio 2, Ronnie James Dio revealed his plans to work with Black Sabbath guitarist Tony Iommi once again. He stated that two songs would be penned, and were to feature on a "project" entitled Black Sabbath – The Dio Years. Black Sabbath bassist Geezer Butler and drummer Bill Ward were initially named as the rhythm section completing the project. At Iommi's behest, the group rebranded themselves Heaven & Hell to differentiate this incarnation from the Osbourne-fronted Black Sabbath. However, for The Dio Years – for which the band would end up recording three new songs rather than two – the band continued to use the Black Sabbath name.

Ward, who performed on the 1980 Heaven and Hell album and the first half of the tour, ultimately declined to be the band's drummer before they recorded, citing musical differences. His departure made way for a reunion of the other Dio-fronted Black Sabbath line-up which included journeyman drummer Vinny Appice. Appice had replaced Ward midway through the original Heaven and Hell tour in 1980, and he remained the Black Sabbath drummer for two years coinciding with Dio's tenure in the band from 1980 to 1982, and again when Dio reunited with the band in 1991 and 1992. He also backed the Osbourne-led version of the group briefly in 1998 while Ward was ill.

Following the recording of three new tracks for Black Sabbath – The Dio Years, the group embarked on a 2007 tour. This tour was voted "Comeback of the Year" at the Classic Rock Roll of Honour Awards by readers of Classic Rock.

=== The Devil You Know (2007–2009) ===
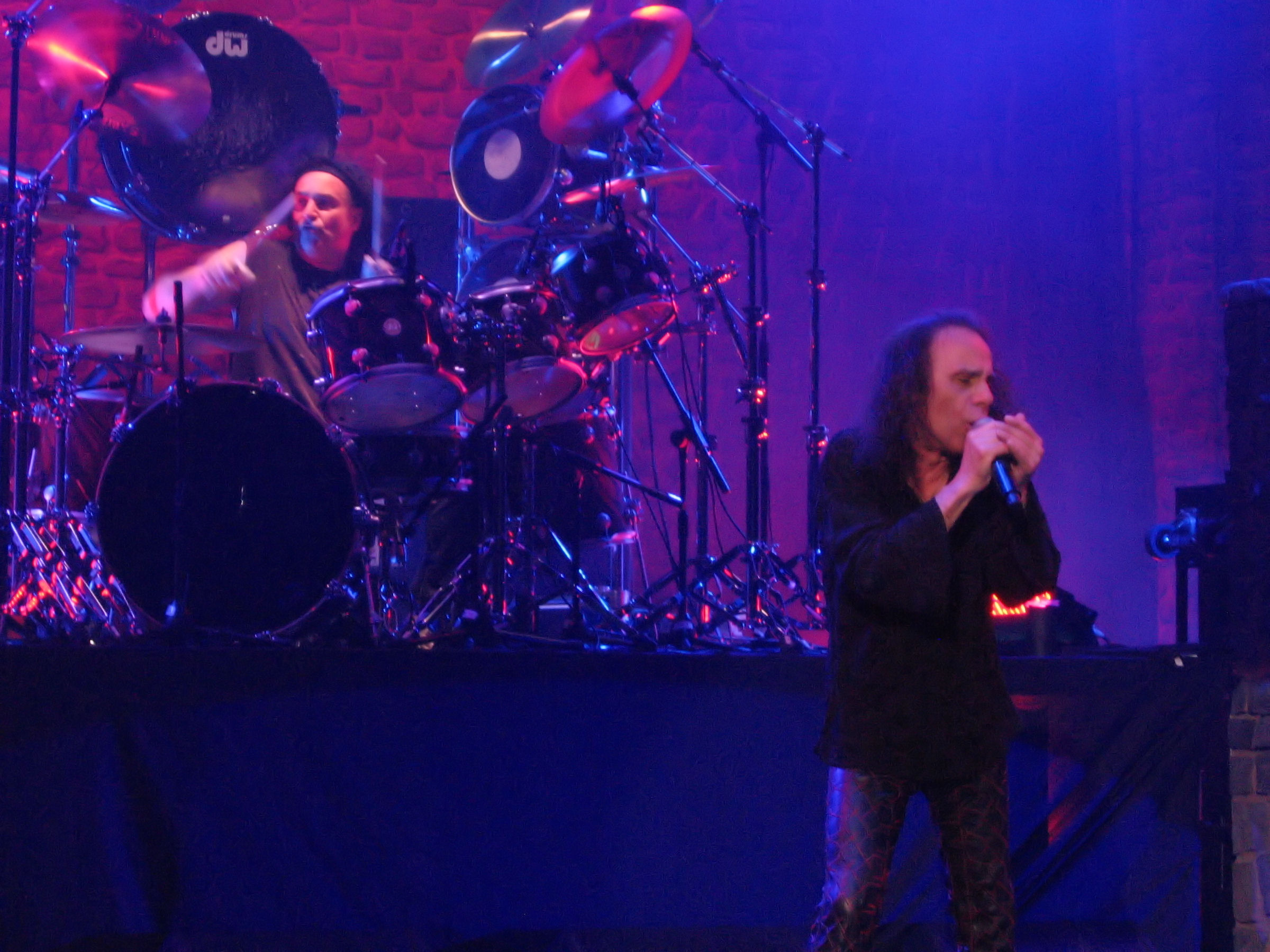
Vinny Appice (left) and Ronnie Dio performing in 2007

Initially, the members had stated that their 2007 tour was a one-off and had expressed their intentions to go their separate ways at its conclusion. Dio planned to return to his eponymous band to produce Magica II and Magica III, sequels to their 2000 album Magica, while Appice would continue with his project 3 Legged Dogg. However, in a March 2007 interview, Dio and Iommi stated that while they were both tied to separate contractual commitments in 2008, neither would discount the possibility of future collaborations; six months later, the band members announced their decision to continue their collaboration and record and release a new album. In August, they took part in the Metal Masters Tour alongside Judas Priest, Motörhead and Testament.

On 28 April 2009, the band released the studio album The Devil You Know, containing the single "Bible Black". The subsequent promotional tour, the Bible Black Tour, spanned from 5 May to 29 August and featured supporting act Coheed and Cambria. It saw stops at the Sweden Rock Festival, the Hellfest in France, the Wâldrock Festival in the Netherlands, the Wacken Open Air and the Sonisphere Festival in Knebworth, UK. The tour's final show in Atlantic City, New Jersey, USA would prove to be Dio's final public performance.

=== Dio's death and break-up (2009–2010) ===
In November 2009, Dio was diagnosed with stomach cancer. Prognoses were initially favourable, however, and the band planned further activity following a brief period of rest for the singer. They were slated to tour in support of Iron Maiden in Europe from July to August, but the tour was cancelled on 4 May due to Dio's ill health. Dio died from this illness on 16 May 2010 at 67 years old.

The three surviving members performed a final Heaven & Hell set in tribute to Dio at the High Voltage Festival on 24 July 2010 with two guest vocalists: former Black Sabbath and Deep Purple vocalist Glenn Hughes and Norwegian singer Jørn Lande of Masterplan fame. Former Pantera and Down vocalist Phil Anselmo also made a brief appearance in the song "Neon Knights". All of the proceeds from the event went towards the Ronnie James Dio Stand Up and Shout Cancer Fund. The posthumous live album Neon Nights: 30 Years of Heaven & Hell was released on 16 November, recorded in Germany at the Wacken Open Air festival on 30 July 2009.

In March 2011, after Heaven & Hell's dissolution, Appice joined Kill Devil Hill along with former Pantera and Down bassist Rex Brown. In November 2011, Iommi and Butler reactivated Black Sabbath with original vocalist Ozzy Osbourne, announcing plans for a world tour and new record with producer Rick Rubin the following year. The resulting Black Sabbath album 13 was released in June 2013.

On 27 March 2026, a box set Breaking Out of Heaven (2007-2009) featuring all of group's previously released material was released through Rhino Entertainment and BMG.

== Band members ==
Former

- Ronnie James Dio – lead vocals, keyboards (2006–2010; his death)
- Tony Iommi – guitar (2006–2010)
- Geezer Butler – bass (2006–2010)
- Bill Ward – drums, percussion (2006)
- Vinny Appice – drums, percussion (2006–2010)

Live

- Scott Warren – keyboards (offstage) (2007–2010)
- Jørn Lande – vocals (2010)
- Glenn Hughes – vocals (2010)

== Discography ==
Title	Album details	Peak chart positions									
Title	Album details	US	AUT	CAN	FIN	GER	JPN	NOR	SWE	SWI	UK
The Devil You Know	Released: 28 April 2009; Label: Rhino; Format: CD, LP	8	37	24	5	17	28	15	8	31	21

Live albums

Recorded	Released	Title	CD	DVD	RIAA certification
March 30, 2007	2007	Live from Radio City Music Hall	99	X	Gold Longform Video
2009 Wacken; Festival in Germany	2010	Neon Nights: 30 Years of Heaven & Hell			

== Discography as Black Sabbath ==
Album details	Notes	Certifications
Heaven and Hell: Released: 18 April 1980; Label: Nems, Warner Bros.; Format: CD, CS, LP	The album features original Black Sabbath drummer Bill Ward. Vinny Appice's association with Black Sabbath/Heaven & Hell began after Ward quit the band in 1980.	Gold (UK); Platinum (US); Gold (Canada)
Mob Rules: Released: 4 November 1981; Label: Vertigo, Warner Bros.; Format: CD, CS, LP	The first recording to feature the lineup that would later form Heaven & Hell.	Silver (UK); Gold (US); Gold (Canada)
Live Evil: Released: January 1983; Label: Vertigo, Warner Bros.; Format: CD, LP	First live Black Sabbath album to feature the lineup that would later form Heaven & Hell.	
Dehumanizer: Released: 22 June 1992; Label: I.R.S.; Format: CD, CS, LP	Last studio album as Black Sabbath to include Dio and Appice.	
The Dio Years: Released: 3 April 2007; Label: Rhino; Warner Bros.; Format: CD	A compilation album, it included three newly recorded songs, all of which were included in later Heaven & Hell live setlists.	
Live at Hammersmith Odeon: Released: 1 May 2007; Label: Rhino; Warner Bros.; Format: CD, LP	Although recorded in 1981 and 1982, this live album was released in 2007 coinciding with the reunion as Heaven & Hell. This album was only sold separately as a limited edition of 5000 copies, but the 2010 two-disc Deluxe Edition of Mob Rules includes the Live at Hammersmith Odeon on its second disc.	
