= Ozzy and Friends Tour =

2012–2015 concert tour by Ozzy Osbourne

- Tour by Ozzy Osbourne
- Location: Europe; Asia; North America; South America
- Start date: 23 May 2012
- End date: 22 November 2015
- Legs: 2
- No. of shows: 23

Ozzy Osbourne concert chronology
- Scream World Tour (2010–2011); Ozzy and Friends Tour (2012; 2015); No More Tours II (2018)

The Ozzy and Friends Tour is a concert tour that replaced the majority of the original 2012 dates of the Black Sabbath Reunion Tour.

On 17 February 2012, Black Sabbath reshuffled its reunion plans in light of guitarist Tony Iommi's battle with lymphoma. The band confirmed that they planned to play only one show on their planned European tour – Download Festival, which took place on 10 June in England. In between the lone performance, Ozzy Osbourne headed out on a 17-date tour as part of Ozzy & Friends, which featured special guests including Slash, Zakk Wylde, Tom Morello and Sabbath's own Geezer Butler on select dates. In 2015, a similar outcome came along, and Sabbath had to pull away from some dates in their 2015 schedule including the 2015 installment of the Japanese Ozzfest. and Ozzy Osbourne and Friends had replaced those slots. The 20 June 2015 concert in Mannheim, Germany was canceled after the opening band, Black Label Society had completed their set due to vocal problems on Osbourne's part.

== Tour dates ==
Date	City	Country	Venue
Europe
23 May 2012	Helsinki	Finland	Hartwall Areena
25 May 2012	Stockholm	Sweden	Stockholm Stadium
27 May 2012	Jelling	Denmark	Jelling Festival
29 May 2012	Bergen	Norway	Bergen Calling Festival
31 May 2012	Oslo	Norway	Oslo Spektrum
2 June 2012	Malmö	Sweden	Malmö Stadion
4 June 2012	Dortmund	Germany	Westfalenhallen
6 June 2012	Prague	Czech Republic	O_{2} Arena
15 June 2012	Vitoria-Gasteiz	Spain	Azkena Rock Festival
17 June 2012	Clisson	France	Hellfest
20 June 2012	Mannheim	Germany	SAP Arena
22 June 2012	Dessel	Belgium	Graspop Metal Meeting
24 June 2012	Milan	Italy	Gods of Metal
26 June 2012	Vienna	Austria	Wiener Stadthalle
28 June 2012	Belgrade	Serbia	Ušće Park
1 July 2012	Malakasa	Greece	Rockwave Festival
South America
25 April 2015	São Paulo	Brazil	Monsters of Rock
28 April 2015	Curitiba	Brazil	Pedreira Paulo Leminski
30 April 2015	Porto Alegre	Brazil	Estádio Zequinha
2 May 2015	Buenos Aires	Argentina	Monsters of Rock
North America
29 August 2015	Culver City	United States	Sony Pictures Studio
31 October 2015	New Orleans	United States	Voodoo Festival
Asia
22 November 2015	Chiba	Japan	Makuhari Messe during Ozzfest Japan 2015

== Personnel ==
- Ozzy Osbourne – vocals
- Geezer Butler – bass (selected dates)
- Zakk Wylde – guitar (selected dates)
- Slash – guitar (selected dates)
- Adam Wakeman – keyboards/guitar
- Gus G – guitar
- Blasko – bass
- Tommy Clufetos – drums
- Tom Morello – guitar (Ozzfest Japan 2015)

== Supporting Acts ==
- Black Label Society – Europe 2012
- Alkbottle – Vienna, Austria (26/6/12)
- Judas Priest – Latin America 2015
- Motörhead – Latin America 2015
- Zerodoze – Porto Alegre, Brazil (30/4/15)
