= Bible Black (song) =

Single by Heaven & Hell

from the album The Devil You Know
- Released: March 20, 2009 (Radio); March 31, 2009 (iTunes)
- Recorded: 2008
- Genre: Doom metal; heavy metal
- Length: 6:29
- Label: Rhino Entertainment
- Songwriters: Ronnie James Dio, Tony Iommi, Geezer Butler
- Producers: Heaven & Hell, Mike Exeter

"Bible Black" is a song by British-American heavy metal band Heaven & Hell from their 2009 album, The Devil You Know. It was released on March 20, 2009, on WAXQ.

== Premise ==
According to singer Ronnie James Dio, the song is about a man who is addicted to the Bible Black, a darkly twisted version of the Holy Bible, which ultimately corrupts and destroys him.

== Music video ==
A music video for the song was made and premiered on VH1 Classic as the first video of Metal Mania. It came on right after the season 2 finale of That Metal Show, which Ronnie James Dio and Geezer Butler of Heaven & Hell were guests on. The video is in animation and features the band via shadows. The premise of the video is an angel in Heaven picks up a black book (a'la the song "Bible Black"). When he opens it, it sends him down to Hell and he loses his wings and halo in the process. The angel tries to escape by climbing a demonic tower, but when he makes it to the top, he is rejected by God and transforms into a devil.

== Track list ==
1. "Bible Black" (6:29)
2. "Neon Knights" (live from Radio City Music Hall) (4:00)
