= Metal Masters Tour =

2008 concert tour

- Tour by Judas Priest, Motörhead, Heaven & Hell and Testament
- Location: North America
- Start date: August 6, 2008
- End date: August 31, 2008
- No. of shows: 17

The Metal Masters Tour was a 17-date concert tour of arenas across North America in August 2008 featuring Judas Priest promoting their album Nostradamus, Motörhead promoting Motörizer, Heaven & Hell promoting The Rules of Hell and Testament promoting The Formation of Damnation.

== Tour dates ==
| Date | City | Country | Venue |
|---|---|---|---|
| August 6, 2008 | Camden | United States | Susquehanna Bank Center |
| August 7, 2008 | Bristow | United States | Nissan Pavilion |
| August 9, 2008 | Holmdel Township | United States | PNC Bank Arts Center |
| August 10, 2008 | Wantagh | United States | Nikon at Jones Beach |
| August 12, 2008 | Hamburg | United States | Erie County Fair |
| August 13, 2008 | Toronto | Canada | Molson Amphitheatre |
| August 15, 2008 | Uncasville | United States | Mohegan Sun Arena |
| August 16, 2008 | Burgettstown | United States | Post-Gazette Pavilion |
| August 18, 2008 | Clarkston | United States | DTE Energy Music Theatre |
| August 19, 2008 | Tinley Park | United States | First Midwest Bank Amphitheatre |
| August 21, 2008 | Oklahoma City | United States | OKC Zoo Amphitheatre |
| August 22, 2008 | Dallas | United States | Superpages.com Amphitheatre |
| August 23, 2008 | The Woodlands | United States | Cynthia Woods Mitchell Pavilion |
| August 24, 2008 | Selma | United States | Verizon Wireless Amphitheater |
| August 27, 2008 | Albuquerque | United States | Journal Pavilion |
| August 28, 2008 | Phoenix | United States | Cricket Wireless Pavilion |
| August 30, 2008 | San Bernardino | United States | San Manuel Amphitheater |
| August 31, 2008 | Mountain View | United States | Shoreline Amphitheatre |

== Setlists ==
Testament setlist

1. "Over the Wall"
2. "The New Order"
3. "More Than Meets the Eye"
4. "Henchmen Ride"
5. "The Formation of Damnation"

Note: 4 other songs varied from show to show, including "Electric Crown" and "Practice What You Preach"

Motörhead setlist

1. "Doctor Rock" or "Rock Out"
2. "Stay Clean"
3. "Be My Baby"
4. "Killers"
5. "Metropolis"
6. "Over the Top"
7. "In the Name of Tragedy" (with drum solo)
8. "Going to Brazil" or "Just 'Cos You Got the Power"
9. "Killed by Death"
10. "Ace of Spades"
11. "Overkill"

Heaven & Hell setlist

1. "E5150"
2. "The Mob Rules"
3. "Children of the Sea"
4. "I"
5. "Sign of the Southern Cross"
6. "Ear in the Wall" (only played at first show)
7. "Vinny Appice Drum Solo"
8. "Time Machine"
9. "Falling off the Edge of the World"
10. "Tony Iommi Guitar Solo"
11. "Die Young"
12. "Heaven and Hell" (extended)

Encore

1. "Neon Knights" (Not performed at some dates due to technical difficulties)

Judas Priest setlist

1. "Dawn of Creation" (Intro)
2. "Prophecy"
3. "Metal Gods"
4. "Eat Me Alive"
5. "Between The Hammer and the Anvil"
6. "Devil's Child"
7. "Breaking the Law"
8. "Hell Patrol"
9. "Death" (not played at some dates)
10. "Dissident Aggressor"
11. "Angel"
12. "The Hellion" (Intro)
13. "Electric Eye"
14. "Rock Hard Ride Free"
15. "Sinner" (not played at some dates)
16. "Painkiller"

Encore

1. "Hell Bent for Leather"
2. "The Green Manalishi (With the Two Prong Crown)"
3. "You've Got Another Thing Comin'"
