= Black Sabbath: The Dio Years =

Compilation album by Black Sabbath / Heaven & Hell
- Released: 3 April 2007
- Recorded: 1980–1982, 1992, 2007
- Genre: Heavy metal
- Length: 79:27
- Labels: Rhino; Warner Bros.
- Producer: Black Sabbath

Black Sabbath chronology
Greatest Hits 1970–1978 (2006)	Black Sabbath: The Dio Years (2007)	Live at Hammersmith Odeon (2007)

Tour Edition cover
- The UK Tour Edition cover

Professional ratings
Review scores
Source	Rating
AllMusic	4.5/5 stars
Billboard	(favorable)
Blabbermouth.net	8.5/10 stars
Jukebox:Metal	5/5 stars
Okayplayer	(89/100)
The Rolling Stone Album Guide	3/5 stars

Black Sabbath: The Dio Years is a 2007 compilation CD of material recorded by the English heavy metal band Black Sabbath during vocalist Ronnie James Dio's tenure in the band. The CD contains remastered tracks taken from the studio albums Heaven and Hell (1980), Mob Rules (1981), and Dehumanizer (1992), as well as a live version of the song "Children of the Sea" taken from the live album Live Evil (1982). It also contains three songs that were recorded in 2007: "The Devil Cried", "Shadow of the Wind", and "Ear in the Wall".

It was reported that the collection was first conceived of as a box set including all albums from Heaven and Hell to The Eternal Idol. This idea was eventually scrapped, and instead a box set was planned to feature just the four albums recorded from the Dio era of the band. This second idea was put aside, though would eventually be revisited as The Rules of Hell, a box set released in the summer of 2008.

In an interview conducted by Martin Popoff, Tony Iommi revealed that originally two new tracks were planned, but after recording three new songs the original plan was changed to accommodate all three tracks in the compilation.

On 23 February 2007, both Eddie Trunk and Sirius Satellite Radio unveiled the song "The Devil Cried" from the upcoming album. Rhino Records subsequently made the track available (for preview only) on 26 February 2007. "The Devil Cried" was released as a single on 13 March 2007.

After the recording was completed, the members decided to tour under the moniker Heaven & Hell. Dio and Iommi decided that the working partnership they had achieved in recording the three new songs would not be wasted, so they recorded The Devil You Know.

== Special editions ==
Before the Heaven & Hell tour of the UK in November 2007, a special edition release of The Dio Years was released on 5 November, Black Sabbath: The Dio Years Tour Edition, to commemorate the tour. This CD, only to be in print for a limited time, features four songs from the Live at Hammersmith Odeon limited edition live album recently released by Black Sabbath. The four songs, recorded live in 1981 during Black Sabbath's "Mob Rules Tour" are "Neon Knights", "The Mob Rules", "Children of the Grave", and "Voodoo".

A limited edition 2-pack was released at Wal-Mart with Hangin' with Heaven and Hell, an interview video with Dio, Iommi and Butler by Eddie Trunk discussing the band's 2007 tour under the name Heaven & Hell. It was filmed in November 2006. It aired on VH1 Classic during March and April 2007. The interview was released on DVD through Rhino to coincide with the release of Black Sabbath: The Dio Years.

== Track listing ==
All songs were written by Ronnie James Dio, Tony Iommi and Geezer Butler, except where noted.

No.	Title	Original release	Length
1.	"Neon Knights" (Dio, Iommi, Butler, Bill Ward)	Heaven and Hell (1980)	3:52
2.	"Lady Evil" (Dio, Iommi, Butler, Ward)	Heaven and Hell	4:24
3.	"Heaven and Hell" (Dio, Iommi, Butler, Ward)	Heaven and Hell	6:58
4.	"Die Young" (Dio, Iommi, Butler, Ward)	Heaven and Hell	4:44
5.	"Lonely Is the Word" (Dio, Iommi, Butler, Ward)	Heaven and Hell	5:51
6.	"The Mob Rules"	Mob Rules (1981)	3:16
7.	"Turn Up the Night"	Mob Rules	3:42
8.	"Voodoo"	Mob Rules	4:34
9.	"Falling Off the Edge of the World"	Mob Rules	5:04
10.	"After All (The Dead)"	Dehumanizer (1992)	5:42
11.	"TV Crimes"	Dehumanizer	4:02
12.	"I"	Dehumanizer	5:13
13.	"Children of the Sea (live)" (Dio, Iommi, Butler, Ward)	Live Evil (1983)	6:14
14.	"The Devil Cried" (Dio, Iommi)	New song (performed by Heaven & Hell)	6:01
15.	"Shadow of the Wind" (Dio, Iommi)	New song (performed by Heaven & Hell)	5:40
16.	"Ear in the Wall" (Dio, Iommi)	New song (performed by Heaven & Hell)	4:04

Bonus Track Version
No.	Title	Length
17.	"The Devil Cried" (radio edit)	4:22

UK Tour Edition bonus CD (recorded live at The Hammersmith Odeon in 1981)
No.	Title	Length
1.	"Neon Knights"	4:37
2.	"The Mob Rules"	3:33
3.	"Children of the Grave" (Osbourne, Iommi, Butler, Ward)	5:03
4.	"Voodoo"	5:44

== Personnel ==
- Ronnie James Dio – vocals
- Tony Iommi – guitars
- Geezer Butler – bass
- Bill Ward – drums (on tracks 1–5)
- Vinny Appice – drums (on tracks 6–16)
- Geoff Nicholls – keyboards (on tracks 1–13)
- Mike Exeter – engineering and mixing

== Charts ==
Chart (2007)	Peak position
Australian Albums (ARIA)	179
Norwegian Albums (VG-lista)	35
Swedish Albums (Sverigetopplistan)	32
UK Rock & Metal Albums (Official Charts)	16
US Billboard 200	54
US Top Rock Albums (Billboard)	16
US Indie Store Album Sales (Billboard)	8
